= Nemesis (Christie novel) =

1971 mystery novel by Agatha Christie

- First edition (UK)
- Author: Agatha Christie
- Cover artist: Unknown
- Language: English
- Series: Miss Marple novels
- Genre: Crime novel
- Published: 5 November 1971 Collins Crime Club (UK); 1971 Dodd, Mead and Company (US)
- Publication place: United Kingdom
- Media type: Print (hardback & paperback)
- Pages: 256 (first edition, hardcover)
- ISBN: 0-00-231563-7
- OCLC: 2656647
- Dewey Decimal: 823/.9/12
- LC Class: PR6005.H66 N4 1971b
- Preceded by: At Bertram's Hotel
- Followed by: Sleeping Murder

Nemesis is a mystery novel by Agatha Christie (1890–1976), first published in the UK by the Collins Crime Club on 5 November 1971 and in the US by Dodd, Mead and Company later the same year. The UK edition retailed at £1.50 and the US edition at $6.95. It was the last Miss Marple novel the author wrote, although Sleeping Murder was the last Miss Marple novel to be published.

Miss Marple first encounters Jason Rafiel in A Caribbean Mystery, where they solve a mystery. In his will, Rafiel leaves another mystery for Miss Marple to solve.

Nemesis received generally positive reviews at the time of publication. It was described as "astonishingly fresh" with a "devilish fine" confrontation and overall was "quite worthy of the Picasso of the detective story". It is a "first-rate story" in a "traditional detective novel". The novel is "readable and ingenious" and "Mrs. Christie remains unflagging" at age 80. A later review by Barnard is the only negative note, stating "The garden paths we are led up are neither enticing nor profitable," and Barnard rates Christie's later novels generally not as good as earlier ones.

Analyses of the plot and characters in the novel find homosexual themes, but Miss Marple "seems to view the passionate friendship between women as just a phase in their life", said to be "a conventional view, held by people of her generation and social class".

== Plot ==
Miss Marple receives a letter from solicitors to the recently-deceased Jason Rafiel, a millionaire who had once helped her solve a murder. In his will, Rafiel leaves Miss Marple £20,000 if she will undertake a particular task, as yet undefined. Unclear what is required, she nevertheless agrees, and joins a coach tour with fifteen other people, arranged by Mr Rafiel prior to his death.

Elizabeth Temple, a retired headmistress, tells her about Verity Hunt, a former schoolgirl of hers who some years ago had become engaged to Rafiel's ne'er-do-well son Michael. As pre-arranged by Rafiel, part way through the tour Miss Marple goes to stay with Lavinia Glynne and her two sisters, Clotilde and Anthea Bradbury-Scott, at their old manor house. Miss Marple learns that this same Verity had joined the family at the manor house after her parents died, and Clotilde had become very attached to her. Some time afterwards, Verity had been brutally murdered, and her disfigured body was discovered in a ditch six months later; Clotilde had to go to identify it. Michael had been convicted of the murder and remains in prison. He was suspected to have murdered another local girl, Nora Broad, at about the same time, but her body was never discovered. Professor Wanstead, a criminal psychologist, confides that he had once examined Michael Rafiel in prison, and had concluded that he was not capable of murder.

Miss Temple is killed while out walking, when a large boulder is pushed down from the hillside above the path. Miss Marple leaves the tour and stays on with the three sisters. Two other tour participants, Miss Barrow and Miss Cooke, leave the tour as well, and are invited back to the manor house for coffee. As they discuss Miss Temple, Miss Cooke suggests coffee would not suit Miss Marple, as it will keep her up all night. Clotilde offers warm milk instead. Miss Barrow and Miss Cooke depart, but not before covertly slipping a whistle into Miss Marple's hand.

At three o'clock in the morning, Clotilde enters Miss Marple's room and is surprised when Miss Marple turns on the light. Miss Marple tells her she did not drink the milk as it would not have been good for her. She knows that Clotilde had killed Verity Hunt because she loved her, and could not bear Verity's desire to leave Clothilde and marry Michael Rafiel. She had buried the body in an abandoned greenhouse in the garden, and in order to throw suspicion on Michael had murdered Nora Broad and misidentified her body as Verity's. She murdered Miss Temple as well, when it became clear that she might know something.

As Clotilde advances toward her, intent on another murder, Miss Marple blows the whistle, bringing Miss Cooke and Miss Barrow to her defence – they are bodyguards engaged by Jason Rafiel. Clotilde drinks the poisoned milk herself.

Michael Rafiel is given a free pardon by the Home secretary, and Miss Marple collects her inheritance, confident she has completed her allotted task.

== Principal characters ==
- Miss Jane Marple: Astute amateur sleuth.
- Jason Rafiel: Millionaire, recently deceased.
- Michael Rafiel: Son of Jason, considered a ne'er do well by his father.
- Esther Walters: Mr Rafiel's secretary.
- Verity Hunt: Engaged to Michael Rafiel years ago. Murder victim.
- Miss Elizabeth Temple: Retired headmistress of the school that Verity Hunt attended. Murder victim.
- Miss Cooke and Miss Barrow: Women on the tour to protect Miss Marple.
- Lavinia Glynne (née Bradbury-Scott): A widow, and one of the three sisters Bradbury-Scott.
- Clotilde Bradbury-Scott: Unmarried elder sister of Lavinia who became attached to Verity Hunt.
- Anthea Bradbury-Scott: Unmarried younger sister of Lavinia and Clotilde.
- Professor Wanstead: Psychiatrist on the tour.
- Archdeacon Brabazon: A friend of Miss Temple.
- Joanna Crawford: Young woman on the tour.
- Emlyn Price: Young man on the tour.
- Nora Broad: Local girl and murder victim.

== Literary significance and reception ==
Matthew Coady in The Guardian of 4 November 1971 concluded, "Not a Christie classic but the old hand is astonishingly fresh and the mixture as relaxing as a hot bath."

Maurice Richardson in The Observer of 31 October 1971 said of Miss Marple in this story, "The showdown when, alone in bed, quite defenceless with not even a knitting-needle, she is confronted by a brawny great fiend of a butch, is devilish fine. Not one of her best, perhaps, but remarkably inventive, quite worthy of the Picasso of the detective story."

The Daily Mirror of 28 October 1971 said, "With this first-rate story Dame Agatha triumphantly returns to the traditional detective novel after a spell of psychological suspense."

Robert Weaver in the Toronto Daily Star of 4 December 1971 said, "Christie richly deserves the loyalty offered up to her by devotees of the traditional mystery. She is readable and ingenious, and in Nemesis she has going for her the amateur lady sleuth Miss Jane Marple deep in a murder case as she tries to carry out a request that comes in effect from beyond the grave. Beyond 80 Miss Christie remains unflagging."

Robert Barnard commented about the plot that "Miss Marple is sent on a tour of stately gardens by Mr Rafiel." His generally negative view of the novel was tersely expressed in one sentence: "The garden paths we are led up are neither enticing nor profitable. All the usual strictures about late Christie apply."

== Homosexual themes ==
The novel deals with the unspoken nature of "female love". Clotilde Bradbury-Scott is depicted as an elderly gentlewoman, living with her two sisters. Upon meeting Clotilde, Miss Marple senses Clotilde's real nature. Yet Miss Marple seems blinded from seeing the truth in this case, due to her own expectations concerning gender.

Miss Marple thinks to herself that Clotilde "would have made a magnificent Clytemnestra – she could have stabbed a husband in his bath with exultation." Yet, she dismisses this thought. Clotilde has never married, and Miss Marple thinks Clotilde incapable of murdering anyone but her version of Agamemnon. In the novel, Clotilde has murdered her own beloved, to prevent the young woman from leaving Clotilde to "live with a man and have children, marriage, and normality.

Christie links the perceived deviance of lesbianism to the deviant behaviour of murder. Yet Clotilde is depicted as being passionate in her love. This passion both prevents her from disfiguring Verity's corpse, and shields her from suffering any real grief about Verity's death.

The identity of the murderer was intended to confound Christie's typical readers. Clotilde Bradbury-Scott is depicted as a respectable spinster. Yet she is revealed to have killed her young ward Verity Hunt, with the combined motivation of love and jealousy. The love between Clotilde and Verity is never fully explored; Christie typically devoted minimal development and exposure to passionate relationships in her works.

In her conclusion, Miss Marple seems to view the passionate friendship between women as just a phase in their life, a phase destined to end when one of the women chooses a male lover instead. This was a choice typically open to the younger woman in a same-sex relationship. This was a conventional view, held by people of Marple's generation and social class. Christie's works in general imply that women have an "imperative need for and right to full sexual experience". Yet in this novel Christie does not entertain the possibility that a lesbian relationship could be just as fulfilling as a heterosexual one.

In the novel, Verity eventually rejects Clotilde in favour of Michael Rafiel. The wisdom of this choice is not really questioned. Miss Marple herself acknowledges that Michael "has never been any good", and that he had little chance of ever reforming, though he has been convicted wrongfully of the murder. Yet Miss Marple seems convinced that Michael was the right man for "the young, beautiful, innocent, and good" Verity, perhaps because he could offer her sexual fulfilment and children. Michael is thus depicted as a superior choice as a romantic partner to Clotilde – the same Clotilde depicted as noble and intelligent, and loving Verity more than anyone or anything in the world. Clotilde is the only character who refuses to accept Verity's natural preference for men.

Verity is not the only one murdered by Clotilde. The other victim is Nora Broad, an attractive working class girl. Clotilde offers Nora "seductive gifts" and acts of friendship, but proceeds to brutally murder her. When asked to identify Nora's corpse, Clotilde falsely identifies her as Verity. This is repeating a pattern from The Body in the Library (1942). In both cases, a person asked to identify a corpse has secret motivations and intentionally makes a false identification. While the police investigate the murder of the upper-class Verity, Nora's disappearance is not investigated. The police consider her just another "promiscuous" girl who did not inform her family that she was running away with a man.

== Adaptations ==
=== Television ===
In 1987, Nemesis was broadcast by the BBC in two 50-minute parts on Sunday, 8 February, and Sunday, 15 February 1987. It was the eighth adaptation (of twelve) in the series Miss Marple starring Joan Hickson as Miss Marple.

At the time of the broadcast, the prequel story A Caribbean Mystery had not been produced or broadcast. The part of Jason Rafiel was eventually played by Donald Pleasence and not by Frank Gatliff who portrayed the character in this production.

Adaptor: Trevor Bowen
Director: David Tucker

Cast:

- Barbara Franceschi as Miss Kurnowitz
- Frank Gatliff as Jason Rafiel
- Peter Tilbury as Lionel Peel
- John Horsley as Professor Wanstead
- Jane Booker as Miss Cooke
- Alison Skilbeck as Miss Barrow
- Valerie Lush as Lavinia Glynne
- Margaret Tyzack as Clothilde Bradbury-Scott
- Anna Cropper as Anthea Bradbury-Scott
- Jonathan Adams as Carter
- Oliver Parker as London policeman
- Bruce Payne as Michael Rafiel
- Roger Hammond as Mr Broadribb
- Patrick Godfrey as Mr Schuster
- Ann Queensbury as Miss Wimpole
- Joanna Hole as Madge
- Helen Cherry as Miss Temple
- Liz Fraser as Mrs Brent
- Marlene Sidaway as Mrs Trollope
- Jonathan Stephens as Policeman
- Diana Agnew as Receptionist
- Peter Copley as Archdeacon Brabazon
- Roger Booth as Mr Pelham
- Reginald Stewart as Mr Hallowes

In 2007, ITV broadcast Nemesis (aired 1 January 2009) with Geraldine McEwan as part of the third season of her Agatha Christie's Marple series.

Director: Nicolas Winding Refn
Cast:

- Laura Michelle Kelly as Verity Hunt/Margaret Lumley
- Dan Stevens as Michael Rafiel
- Richard E. Grant as Raymond West
- Amanda Burton as Sister Clotilde
- Anne Reid as Mother Agnes
- Ronni Ancona as Amanda Dalrymple
- Ruth Wilson as Georgina Barrow
- Lee Ingleby as Detective Constable Colin Hards
- Will Mellor as Martin Waddy
- Emily Woof as Rowena Waddy
- George Cole as Lawrence Raeburn
- Johnny Briggs as Sydney Lumley
- Adrian Rawlins as Derek Turnball
- Graeme Garden as Matthew Broadribb

The novel was also adapted as part of the 2018 Korean television series Ms. Ma, Nemesis.

=== Radio ===
Nemesis was adapted for radio dramatisation by BBC Radio 4 starring June Whitfield. It first aired in November–December 1998 and again in later years, including 2011 and 2013.

- June Whitfield as Miss Marple
- George A. Cooper as Mr Rafiel
- David Swift as Professor Wanstead
- Louie Ramsay as Lavinia Glynne
- Thelma Barlow as Anthea Bradbury-Scott
- Mary Wimbush as Clotilde Bradbury-Scott
- Jill Balcon as Miss Temple
- Desmond Llewelyn as Archdeacon Brabazon
- Tricia Hitchcock as Miss Cooke
- Delia Lindsay as Miss Barrow
- Molly Gaisford as Joanna Crawford
- Jane Whittenshaw as Cherry
- Geoffrey Whitehead as Mr Broadribb

== Publication history ==
The novel was first serialised in the UK weekly magazine Woman's Realm in seven abridged instalments from 25 September (Vol 27, No 702) to 6 November 1971 (Vol 27, No 708), with illustrations by Len Thurston. In North America the novel was serialised in the Star Weekly Novel, a Toronto newspaper supplement, in two abridged instalments from 16 to 23 October 1971, with each issue containing the same cover illustration by Laszlo Gal.

== Bibliography ==
- Gill, Gilliam (2016), "Introduction: The Hidden Author", Agatha Christie: The Woman and Her Mysteries, Portici, ISBN 978-1-911042-74-7
- Makinen, Merja (2006), "Women Outside the Familial Norms", Agatha Christie: Investigating Femininity, Palgrave Macmillan, ISBN 978-0-230-59827-0
