= Caroline Blakiston =

British actress (born 1933)

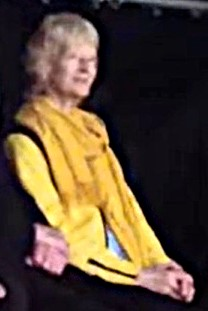
- Blakiston in 2018
- Born: Caroline Georgiana Blakiston; 13 February 1933 (age 93); Chelsea, London, England
- Occupation: Actress
- Years active: 1961–2019
- Spouse: Russell Hunter (m. 1970, divorced)
- Children: 2

Caroline Georgiana Blakiston (born 13 February 1933) is an English actress. She is best known for her role in the British television comedy series Brass and to international audiences as Mon Mothma in the Star Wars film Return of the Jedi, and Aunt Agatha in Poldark.

== Early life ==
Blakiston was born in London, younger of two daughters of the archivist and author Hugh Noel Blakiston (1905–1984), OBE, and writer (Rachel) Georgiana (1903–1995), daughter of barrister Harold John Hastings Russell and Victoria Alberta Leveson-Gower, whose father was the statesman Granville Leveson-Gower, 2nd Earl Granville. The Blakiston family originated in County Durham, and were related to the Blakiston baronets.

Blakiston attended RADA, graduating in 1957.

== Career ==
In the 1960s, Blakiston appeared in three episodes of The Avengers as well a number of ITC productions such as The Saint, Department S and the 1969 Randall and Hopkirk (Deceased) episode "Never Trust a Ghost". In 1971, she appeared in John Schlesinger's Sunday Bloody Sunday. She appeared to great acclaim as Marjorie Ferrar in the BBC Television adaptation of Galsworthy's The Forsyte Saga in 1967. Blakiston played Cynthia Muldoon in the 1968 premiere of Tom Stoppard’s play The Real Inspector Hound. In 1977, she appeared in Raffles as Lady Paulton, and also in Murder Most English as Helen Carobleat. In 1978, she appeared as Kathleen Fenton in the Crown Court episode "Association". In 1980–1981, she starred in the BBC/Australian TV World War II comedy series Private Schulz as The Countess.

In 1983, Blakiston played the wayward character of Lady Patience Hardacre in the satirical Granada television series Brass, which ran for three series. She portrayed Mon Mothma, the primary political leader of the Rebel Alliance in the 1983 Star Wars film, Return of the Jedi. The 1980s saw Blakiston in a lead role as head of a special unit within British intelligence, opposite Alec McCowen in Mr. Palfrey of Westminster.

In 1986, Blakiston played the glamorous adventuress Bess Sedgwick opposite Joan Hickson's Miss Marple, in the episode "At Bertram's Hotel" of the BBC's Miss Marple series. She also appeared as Lionel Hardcastle's ex-wife in an episode of As Time Goes By. She and Geoffrey Palmer (Lionel) had previously played estranged spouses a decade earlier in Carla Lane's series The Last Song. From 2015 to 2018, Blakiston played Aunt Agatha in the BBC adaptation Poldark.

== Personal life ==
In 1970, Blakiston married the actor Russell Hunter after they had played together in A Midsummer Night's Dream at the Open Air Theatre, Regent's Park. They had a son and a daughter together, but later divorced.

== Filmography ==
=== Film ===
Year	Title	Role	Notes
1966	The Idol	Second Woman at Party	
1966	The Trygon Factor	White Nun	
1969	The Magic Christian	Honourable Esther Grand	
1971	Sunday Bloody Sunday	Rowing Wife	
1978	Saturday Sunday Monday	Elena	TV film
1978	Les Misérables	Madame Thenardier	TV film
1979	Yanks	Golfing Friend	
1983	Star Wars: Episode VI – Return of the Jedi	Mon Mothma	
1987	The Fourth Protocol	Angela Berenson	
1998	The Children of the New Forest	Aunt Judith	TV film
2003	The War of the Starfighters	Operative	Voice role
2006	Coup!	Margaret Thatcher	TV film
2006	Scoop	Mrs. Quincy	
2008	The Commander: Abduction	Mary Henson	TV film
2011	For Elsie	Mama Kilov	Short
2013	Round and Round the Garden	Woman	Short
2018	Mary Anning	Molly Anning	Short
2019	The Leaving Party	Joy	Short

== Television ==
Year	Title	Role	Notes
1961	The Avengers	Elaine Bateman	Episode: "Dance with Death"
1962	City Beneath the Sea	Ann Boyd	Series regular
1963	No Hiding Place	Annette Rosser	Episode: "Tell Them Upstairs"
1963	ITV Play of the Week	Nurse	Episode: "For King and Country #1: Out There"
1963	No Cloak – No Dagger	Pat Penmore	Series regular
1963	Emergency Ward 10	Susan Chambers	3 episodes
1964–1965	Emergency Ward 10	Lena Hyde	Series regular
1965	Story Parade	WPC Anne Cunningham	Episode: "The Make-Believe Man"
1965	Love Story	Brenda	Episode: "After Hours"
1965	The Avengers	Miss Thirlwell	Episode: "The Gravediggers"
1965	Public Eye	Eva Garston	Episode: "Nobody Kills Santa Claus"
1966	The Saint	Eleanor Bastion	Episode: "The Convenient Monster"
1966	Out of the Unknown	Odile Keppler	Episode: "Second Childhood"
1966	The Baron	Felicia Talbot	Episode: "So Dark the Night"
1967	The Forsyte Saga	Marjorie Ferrar	Recurring role
1967	Love Story	Zoe	Episode: "The Swordfighter"
1967	The Avengers	Cynthia Wentworth-Howe	Episode: "The Positive Negative Man"
1967	Meeting Point	Mandy Pride	Episode: "The House by the Stable"
1968	The Wednesday Play	Matilda Boff	Episode: "Coincidence"
1968	Public Eye	George	Episode: "Mercury in an Off-White Mac"
1968	Armchair Theatre	Jessa	Episode: "Unscheduled Stop"
1968	The Queen Street Gang	Auntie Cuthbert	4 episodes
1968	The Champions	Marion Grant	Episode: "The Experiment"
1968	The Caesars	Agrippina	Mini-series
1969	The Power Game	Margot Fellowship	Episode: "The Goose Chase"
1969	Fraud Squad	Kay Pilgrim	Episode: "Run for Your Money"
1969	Randall and Hopkirk (Deceased)	Karen Howarth	Episode: "Never Trust a Ghost"
1969	Department S	Kate Mortimer	Episode: "The Shift That Never Was"
1969	Strange Report	Louise	Episode: "Report 2493: Kidnap – Whose Pretty Girl Are You?"
1970	Paul Temple	Judy Saire	Episode: "Right Villain"
1970	Play for Today	Esther	Episode: "The Lie"
1971	Man at the Top	Maureen Binsey	Episode: "Too Good for This World"
1971	Shadows of Fear	Maureen	Episode: "Return of Favours"
1971	Wives and Daughters	Lady Harriet	Mini-series
1972	His and Hers	Felicity Farrell	Episode: "Diet"
1972	Villains	Rene	Episode: "Chas"
1973	Then and Now	Erica	Episode: "In Memoriam"
1976	Murder	Elizabeth	Episode: "A Variety of Passion"
1976	Well Anyway	Cornelia de Vance	Episode: "There Again"
1977	Raffles	Lady Paulton	Episode: "An Old Flame"
1977	The Sunday Drama	Deborah	Episode: "The Late Wife"
1977	Murder Most English: A Flaxborough Chronicle	Helen Carobleat	2 episodes
1977	The Children of the New Forest	Judith Villiers	1 episode
1977–1982	Crown Court	Kathleen Fenton	Series regular
1978	Wilde Alliance	Elena	Episode: "Well Enough Alone"
1978	The Lively Arts	Narrator	Episode: "A Haunted Man"
1978	ITV Sunday Night Drama	Emily	Episode: "The Last Romantic"
1978	The Many Wives of Patrick	Princess Poliakoff	Episode: "One of the Smart Set in a Smart Setting"
1978	The Sweeney	Hildegarde	Episode: "Hearts and Minds"
1979	Kids	Fay Wilkins	Episode: "Diana"
1979	Prince Regent	Frances Jersey	Mini-series
1979	The Dick Francis Thriller: The Racing Game	Sylvia Guiccoli	Episode: "Gambling Lady"
1979–1980	The Mallens	Anna Brigmore	Series regular
1980	Shoestring	Monica	Episode: "Looking for Mr Wright"
1981	Nanny	Adela Quinn	2 episodes
1981	Private Schulz	Countess	1 episode
1981–1983	The Last Song	Alice Bannister	Series regular
1982	Play for Today	Josie	Episode: "Life After Death"
1983	All for Love	Narrator	Episode: "Miss A and Miss M"
1983–1990	Brass	Patience Hardacre	Series regular
1984–1985	Mr. Palfrey of Westminster	Co-Ordinator	Series regular
1985	Charters and Caldicott	Margaret Mottram	Series regular
1987	The Refuge	Helen Crichton-Crick	
1987	Agatha Christie's Miss Marple (TV series)	Bess Sedgwick	Episode: "At Bertram's Hotel"
1989	Till We Meet Again	Madame Courdet	Mini-series
1990	Chancer	Mary Douglas	3 episodes
1991	Shrinks	Lady Dyer	1 episode
1991	Lovejoy	Miss Hemmingway	Episode: "Sugar & Spice"
1991	Murder Most Horrid	Rachel Vine	Episode: "A Determined Woman"
1992–1993	Mulberry	Adele Farnaby	2 episodes
1992–1993	Rides	Scarlett	Series regular
1993	Harry	Natasha Lee	1 episode
1994	The Memoirs of Sherlock Holmes	Dowager Duchess	Episode: "The Three Gables"
1996	As Time Goes By	Margaret	Episode: "Lionel's Ex-Wife"
1998	The Grand	Isobel Crawford	1 episode
1999	Sunburn	Mrs Armitage	1 episode
2005	Heartbeat	Hildy Dressler	Episode: "Picture This"
2005	Midsomer Murders	Angela Hartley	Episode: "Bantling Boy"
2006	The Line of Beauty	Lady Partridge	Mini-series
2008	Small Dark Places	Lady Welling	TV short
2009	Midsomer Murders	Hilary Compton	Episode: "Small Mercies"
2011	Doctors	Geraldine Crofte	Episode: "The Good Daughter"
2012	Holby City	Kathleen Pennington	Episode: "Through the Darkness"
2013	Agatha Christie's Poirot	Julia Carstairs	Episode: "Elephants Can Remember"
2014	Father Brown	Lavinia Pryde	Episode: "The Pride of the Prydes"
2015	Casualty	Frances Barrett	Episode: "The Long Haul"
2015–2018	Poldark	Aunt Agatha	Series regular
2016	Midsomer Murders	Sylvia Lennard	Episode: "The Village That Rose from the Dead"
