= Sleeping Murder =

1976 mystery novel by Agatha Christie

Sleeping Murder: Miss Marple's Last Case
- First edition (UK)
- Author: Agatha Christie
- Cover artist: Not known
- Language: English
- Series: Miss Marple novels
- Genre: Crime novel
- Publisher: Collins Crime Club
- Publication date: October 1976
- Publication place: United Kingdom
- Media type: Print (hardback & paperback)
- Pages: 224 first edition, hardback
- ISBN: 0-00-231785-0
- OCLC: 2904600
- Dewey Decimal: 823/.9/12
- LC Class: PZ3.C4637 Sm PR6005.H66
- Preceded by: Nemesis

Sleeping Murder: Miss Marple's Last Case is a mystery novel by Agatha Christie, first published in the UK by the Collins Crime Club in October 1976 and in the US by Dodd, Mead and Company later in the same year. The UK edition retailed for £3.50 and the US edition for $7.95.

The book features Miss Marple. Released posthumously, it was the last published Christie novel, although not the last Miss Marple novel in order of writing. The story is explicitly set in 1944, but the first draft of the novel was possibly written during the Blitz in 1940. Miss Marple aids a young couple who choose to uncover events in the wife's past life, and not let sleeping murder lie.

== Plot ==
Newlywed Gwenda Reed travels from New Zealand ahead of her husband to find a home in England. She finds and buys Hillside, a large old house that she feels a strange connection to. She supervises the renovation, discovering she has very definite ideas of what should be done. When workmen open a long-sealed door, they find the very wallpaper that had been in her mind; and her request for a doorway between two rooms proves to have been such a doorway years earlier. She goes to London to visit relatives: the author Raymond West, his wife, and his aunt, Miss Jane Marple. During a performance of The Duchess of Malfi, at the line "Cover her face; mine eyes dazzle; she died young", Gwenda screams. She sees a man saying those very words strangling a blonde-haired woman whom she thinks of as Helen.

Gwenda had been born in India. After her mother died, she was raised in New Zealand by her mother's sister, and her father died a few years later. She has memories of being on a ship as a young child. Miss Marple suggests that Gwenda had lived in England with her father and his second wife, which proves to be the case. Her stepmother, Helen Halliday (née Kennedy), had met her father travelling from India back to England, and their shipboard romance led to marriage upon arrival in England.

The coincidences prove to be memories from Gwenda's stay in Hillside 18 years ago as a young child. Her husband Giles arrives from New Zealand, and the couple decide to pursue the mystery.

Helen had been raised mainly by her half-brother, Dr Kennedy, now retired from practice. He replies to an advertisement seeking information about Helen. Miss Marple finds the man who once gardened for the Kennedy family, who supplies useful descriptions of events. Miss Marple also finds the cook from the Halliday household, Edith, who remembers that time well. The Hallidays were soon to move to a house in Norfolk before Helen disappeared. It seems that Helen had wanted to get away from someone, and the servants presumed it was her husband.

The Reeds advertise, seeking the Hallidays' former maid Lily. She writes first to Dr Kennedy, seeking his advice. She says that she does not believe that Helen ran off, as the clothes packed in her suitcase made no sense – she took an evening gown but not the shoes and belt that went with it. The Reeds and Dr Kennedy agree he should write back to her to arrange a meeting. Lily never arrives.

The police find Lily's body, strangled, in a copse near the railway station. She had come by an earlier train than expected, even though she had with her Dr Kennedy's letter indicating the correct, later arrival time. Soon they are digging up the garden at the end of the terrace, where they find Helen's body. While Gwenda is in the house alone, Dr Kennedy approaches and attempts to strangle her. Miss Marple arrives with a container of soapy solution, which she sprays in his eyes.

Miss Marple explains that Dr Kennedy was the person Helen had wanted to get away from; she had dearly loved Halliday and his daughter. Kennedy had strangled his sister, saying the closing words from the play, unaware of young Gwenda watching from the stairs above. Kennedy had previously given Halliday drugs to make him paranoid, then drugged his drink, posing him next to the strangled Helen to convince him that he was the killer. Kennedy then buried Helen in the garden. Since no body was ever found, Halliday's belief that he had killed Helen led him to be diagnosed as insane, and he died in a nursing home.

The letter found with Lily was not the one she received from Kennedy; he had switched it after he killed her. After a full confession from Kennedy, Miss Marple comments that they should have seen it from the start: those words from the play had been spoken by a brother who had just killed his sister.

== Principal characters ==
- Miss Jane Marple: Astute amateur sleuth.
- Gwenda Halliday Reed: 21 years old and newly married woman from New Zealand, settling in England with her new husband.
- Giles Reed: Gwenda's husband, who met her in New Zealand.
- Mrs Cocker: cook for the Reed household.
- Raymond West: well-known author and nephew of Miss Jane Marple.
- Joan West: Painter, wife of Raymond, and cousin to Giles Reed.
- Dr Haydock: Miss Marple's doctor.
- Edith (Edie) Pagett: a cook years earlier at the Halliday home St Catherine (now called Hillside), who still resides in Dillmouth.
- Leonie: a young Swiss woman.
- Lily Abbott Kimble: a house parlourmaid in the Halliday household, now married.
- Manning: now 75 years old; a gardener to the Kennedy household when Helen was alive.
- Major Kelvin Halliday: married to Megan, and father of Gwenda.
- Alison Danby: Gwenda's aunt who raised her in New Zealand, sister to her late mother Megan.
- Helen Spenlove Halliday (née Kennedy): a young blonde woman, half-sister to Dr Kennedy, wife to Major Halliday, and stepmother to Gwenda. She was a lively and loving young woman.
- Dr James Kennedy: Helen's elder half-brother, who raised her once both parents died. He retired from practice soon after his sister disappeared.
- Jackie (J. J.) Afflick: local boy, first working as clerk in Fane's law firm. Now married to Dorothy, and owns a coach tour service.
- Walter Fane: the local lawyer's son.
- Richard Erskine: a married man who met Helen on the ship to India, when he was travelling alone.
- Mrs Janet Erskine: Richard's wife, and mother to their two sons.
- Dr Penrose: a staff member at Saltmarsh House nursing home in Norfolk, where Major Halliday spent the last years of his life.
- Inspector Last: police officer.
- Detective Inspector Primer: leads the investigation of Lily's murder.

== Writing and publication process ==
Sleeping Murder, like Curtain (Hercule Poirot's last mystery, which concludes the sleuth's career and life), was written by Christie during the Second World War, apparently sometime during the Blitz, which took place between September 1940 and May 1941. Agatha Christie's literary correspondence files indicate that the initial draft of the novel was written early in 1940.

Christie's notebooks are open to interpretation in hindsight; John Curran argues that Sleeping Murder was still being planned at the end of the 1940s and the beginning of the 1950s. His basis is the many changes to the title of the novel, since other authors had used her first title ideas: one of Christie's notebooks contain references to Cover Her Face (second title) under "Plans for Sept. 1947" and "Plans for Nov. 1948", suggesting she was planning to re-read and revise the manuscript.

Previous biographers, who did not have access to the Notebooks, state that Sleeping Murder was written in 1940.

Nevertheless, support for the story being first written in 1940 is found in the correspondence files of Christie's literary agents: Christie's royalty statement for 15 March 1940 states that the secretarial agency hired by Edmund Cork to type up Murder in Retrospect (the first title of the manuscript) charged £19 13s. 9d. On 7 June 1940, Edmund Cork wrote to Christie advising her that he would have the necessary 'deed of gift' drawn up so her husband Max would become the owner of the unpublished Miss Marple novel. Christie eventually visited Edmund Cork's offices at 40 Fleet Street, London, on 14 October 1940 and signed the document transferring ownership of the copyright of Murder in Retrospect to her husband in consideration of what was termed her "natural love and affection for him".

Christie refers in her autobiography to the last Poirot and Miss Marple novels that she penned during the Second World War. She writes that she had written an extra two books during the first years of the war in anticipation of being killed in the raids, for at the time she was working in London. One, which she wrote first, was for her daughter, Rosalind Hicks – a book with Hercule Poirot in it – and the other, with Miss Marple in it, was for Max. She adds that these two books, after being composed, were put in the vaults of a bank, and were made over formally by deed of gift to her daughter and husband.

The last Marple novel Christie wrote, Nemesis, was published in 1971, followed by the last Poirot novel Christie wrote Elephants Can Remember in 1972 and then, in 1973, her very last novel Postern of Fate. Aware that she would write no more novels, Christie authorised the publication of Curtain in 1975 to send off Poirot. She then arranged to have Sleeping Murder published in 1976, but she died before its publication in October of that year.

By contrast to Poirot, who dies in the final novel, Miss Marple lives on. This last published novel is set in 1944, but follows novels set in later years, which show Miss Marple to have aged. In Nemesis, Miss Marple does no gardening on the advice of her doctor, showing her to be in more fragile health. In Sleeping Murder, she is frequently pulling bindweed from the neglected garden at the Reeds' home, but that may be a cover for searching for the site of the victim's burial. There is a reference to a wireless set as a desired purchase by Lily, were she to receive money by responding to the newspaper notice seeking her; this reinforces the story's setting being in the 1930s, as the author intended in her final revisions (done in 1950).

== Title changes ==
Christie's original manuscript of Sleeping Murder was entitled Murder in Retrospect after one of the chapters in the book. When the Hercule Poirot novel Five Little Pigs was later serialised in the US in Collier's Weekly from September to November 1941, the magazine's editing board retitled it Murder in Retrospect. This was also the title used by Christie's American publisher Dodd Mead and Company, presumably in order to capitalise on the recent US serialisation. Christie's original manuscript of Sleeping Murder was duly retitled Cover Her Face.

Following the publication of P.D. James's début crime novel Cover Her Face in 1962, Christie became aware of the need to think up yet another title for the last Miss Marple book. She wrote to Edmund Cork on 17 July 1972, asking him to send her a copy of the unpublished Miss Marple manuscript and a copy of Max's deed of gift. So much time had passed that she was unable to remember if the manuscript was still called Cover Her Face or She Died Young.

== Literary significance and reception ==
George Thaw in the Daily Mirror of 22 October 1976 said: "Agatha Christie's last novel is very good. Sleeping Murder is the last of Miss Marple's excursions into detection. But perhaps it is her best. Agatha Christie wrote it years ago but if I was going to pick a swansong book this is certainly the one that I would choose. It's her best for years."

Gavin Lambert in the New York Times Book Review of 19 September 1976 said: "Displays Agatha Christie's personal sense of what she calls 'evil,' of murder as an affront and a violation and an act of unique cruelty... When Marple tells us here that 'it was real evil that was in the air that night,' Christie makes us feel her curious primitive shiver. It is certainly the most interesting aspect of her personality and probably accounts for her extraordinary success."

Robert Barnard: "Slightly somniferous mystery, written in the 'forties but published after Christie's death. Concerns a house where murder has been committed, bought (by the merest coincidence) by someone who as a child saw the body. Sounds like Ross Macdonald, and certainly doesn't read like vintage Christie. But why should an astute businesswoman hold back one of her better performances for posthumous publication?" H. R. F. Keating included the novel in his list of "100 Best Crime and Mystery Books". It was one of the bestselling books of 1976.

== Adaptations ==
=== Television ===
Sleeping Murder was filmed by the BBC as a 100-minute film in the sixth adaptation (of twelve) in the series Miss Marple starring Joan Hickson as Miss Marple. It was transmitted in two 50-minute parts on Sunday, 11 January and Sunday, 18 January 1987. This adaptation is fairly true to the plot of the novel.

Adapter: Ken Taylor

Director: John Davies

Cast:

- Joan Hickson as Miss Marple
- Geraldine Alexander as Gwenda Reed
- John Moulder Brown as Giles Reed
- Frederick Treves as Dr James Kennedy
- Jean Anderson as Mrs Fane
- Terrence Hardiman as Walter Fane
- John Bennett as Richard Erskine
- Geraldine Newman as Janet Erskine
- Jack Watson as Mr Foster
- Joan Scott as Mrs Cocker
- Jean Heywood as Edith Paget
- Georgine Anderson as Mrs Hengrave
- Edward Jewesbury as Mr Sims
- David McAlister as Raymond West
- Amanda Boxer as Joan West
- Esmond Knight as Mr Galbraith
- John Ringham as Dr Penrose
- Eryl Maynard as Lily Kimble
- Ken Kitson as Jim Kimble
- Kenneth Cope as Jackie "JJ" Afflick
- Peter Spraggon as Detective Inspector Last
- Sheila Raynor as shop assistant
- Donald Burton as Bosola (onstage)
- Struan Rodger as Ferdinand (onstage)
- Gary Watson as Major Kelvin Halliday

The novel was adapted as a Syrian drama series, "جريمة في الذاكرة" (Crime in the Memory), which was broadcast in 1992.

The novel was also adapted as a set of four episodes of the Japanese animated television series Agatha Christie's Great Detectives Poirot and Marple, airing in 2005.

A second British television adaptation, set in 1951, was transmitted on 5 February 2006 as part of ITV's Agatha Christie's Marple, starring Geraldine McEwan and Sophia Myles as Miss Marple and Gwenda, respectively.

Adapter: Stephen Churchett

Director: Edward Hall

Cast:

- Geraldine McEwan as Miss Jane Marple
- Russ Abbot as Chief Inspector Arthur Primer
- Geraldine Chaplin as Mrs Fane
- Phil Davis as Dr James Alfred Kennedy
- Dawn French as Janet Erskine
- Martin Kemp as Jackie Afflick
- Aidan McArdle as Hugh Hornbeam
- Paul McGann as Dickie Erskine
- Sophia Myles as Gwenda Halliday
- Anna-Louise Plowman as Helen Marsden
- Peter Serafinowicz as Walter Fane
- Una Stubbs as Edith Pagett
- Julian Wadham as Kelvin Halliday
- Sarah Parish as Evie Ballantine
- Emilio Doorgasingh as Sergeant Desai
- Harry Treadaway as George Erskine
- Richard Bremmer as Mr Sims
- Harriet Walter as the Duchess of Malfi (onstage)
- Greg Hicks as Ferdinand (onstage)
- Mary Healey as Shop Assistant
- Helen Coker as Lily Tutt
- Nickolas Grace as Lionel Luff
- Vince Leigh as Jim Tutt
- Darren Carnall as Dresser

The tenth episode of the French television series Les Petits Meurtres d'Agatha Christie was an adaptation of this novel. It aired in 2012.

=== Radio ===
The novel was adapted as a 90-minute play for BBC Radio 4 and transmitted as part of the Saturday Play strand on 8 December 2001. June Whitfield reprised her role as Miss Marple (she played Miss Marple in several radio adaptations in the 20th century). It was recorded on 10 October 2001.

Adapter: Michael Bakewell

Producer: Enyd Williams

Cast:

- June Whitfield as Miss Marple
- Julian Glover as Dr Kennedy
- Beth Chalmers as Gwenda Reed
- Carl Prekopp as Giles Reed
- Hilda Schroder as Mrs Hengrave
- Carolyn Pickles as Aunt Alison and Mrs Erskine
- Joan Littlewood as Edith
- Derek Waring as Richard Erskine
- Ioan Meredith as Walter Fane
- Michael N. Harbour as Jackie Afflick
- Ewan Bailey as Inspector Last

== Publication history ==
In the US the novel was serialised in Ladies' Home Journal in two abridged instalments from July (Volume XCIII, Number 7) to August 1976 (Volume XCIII, Number 8) with an illustration by Fred Otnes.
