= The Mirror Crack'd =

1980 film by Guy Hamilton

- Theatrical release poster
- Directed by: Guy Hamilton
- Screenplay by: Jonathan Hales; Barry Sandler
- Based on: The Mirror Crack'd from Side to Side by Agatha Christie
- Produced by: John Brabourne; Richard Goodwin
- Starring: Angela Lansbury; Geraldine Chaplin; Tony Curtis; Edward Fox; Rock Hudson; Kim Novak; Elizabeth Taylor
- Cinematography: Christopher G. Challis
- Edited by: Richard Marden
- Music by: John Cameron
- Production companies: EMI Films; GW Films
- Distributed by: Columbia-EMI-Warner Distributors
- Release dates: 18 December 1980 (United States); 6 February 1981 (United Kingdom)
- Running time: 105 minutes
- Country: United Kingdom
- Language: English
- Budget: $5.5 million
- Box office: $5.5 million

The Mirror Crack'd is a 1980 British mystery film directed by Guy Hamilton and starring Angela Lansbury, Geraldine Chaplin, Tony Curtis, Edward Fox, Rock Hudson, Kim Novak, and Elizabeth Taylor. The screenplay by Jonathan Hales and Barry Sandler was adapted from Agatha Christie's Miss Marple novel The Mirror Crack'd from Side to Side (1962). Its plot follows Jane Marple's investigation of a local woman's poisoning, which she believes was intended for a visiting movie star.

Scenes were filmed at Twickenham Film Studios in Twickenham, Middlesex, and on location in Kent.

== Plot ==
The film is set in 1953 in St Mary Mead, the English village where Miss Jane Marple resides. A Hollywood production company arrives to film a costume drama about Mary, Queen of Scots and Elizabeth I with two famous movie stars, Marina Rudd and Lola Brewster. Marina is making a much-heralded comeback after a prolonged career absence (due to a mental health crisis after her son was born with severe brain damage). She and her husband, Jason Rudd, the film's director, arrive with an entourage. Marina is angry upon learning that her rival Lola is in the film. Lola and her husband, Marty Fenn, the film's producer, soon arrive.

The villagers attend a village fête at Gossington Hall, a large manor house, to welcome the film crew. During the indoor reception, Lola and Marina exchange insults while posing for photos. A devoted fan, Heather Babcock, bores Marina with a detailed story about once meeting her during WWII. She recounts leaving her sickbed to meet the glamorous star. Marina asks Jason to bring both her and Heather a cocktail. Heather suddenly dies after drinking it.

Her death is later attributed to a barbiturate overdose in the drink, though is believed that Marina was the intended murder victim. She receives anonymous death threats made from newspaper clippings, and her coffee on the film set, which she refused to drink, was spiked with arsenic.

Inspector Craddock, the Scotland Yard detective investigating the case is baffled. He asks his aunt, Jane Marple, for help. Marple is recovering at home after injuring her foot at the village fête. The suspects are Ella Zielinsky, Jason's assistant who is secretly in love with him and would like Marina out of the way, and the hotheaded actress, Lola.

The main suspect, Zielinsky, calls the murderer from a village phone box, threatening to expose them. She is then killed by a lethal nasal spray containing prussic acid instead of hay-fever medication.

Miss Marple, now recovered, visits Gossington Hall and inspects the murder scene. Helped by information that Cherry, her cleaning woman who was a server at the reception, has provided, Marple solves the mystery. However, another death has occurred at Gossington Hall that reveals the killer's identity: Marina Rudd, who has apparently committed suicide.

Miss Marple explains that Heather Babcock's story was Marina's motive. Years before, when Heather sneaked out to meet Marina, she unintentionally infected Marina with German measles, a mild disease that can be dangerous for a pregnant woman's foetus. Marina's child was born mentally handicapped. Hearing Heather cheerfully recount their earlier encounter, enraged and overwhelmed Marina who poisoned her. She then made it appear that she was the intended victim, crafting the false clues. Ella, who called various suspects from a phone box, accidentally guessed correctly, prompting Marina to murder her. Jason confesses to Miss Marple that he had poisoned his wife's hot chocolate to save her from being prosecuted, but the drink was untouched. Marina is nonetheless found dead, seemingly having poisoned herself.

== Cast ==
- Angela Lansbury as Miss Jane Marple
- Elizabeth Taylor as Marina Gregg-Rudd
- Rock Hudson as Jason Rudd
- Tony Curtis as Martin "Marty" N. Fenn
- Kim Novak as Lola Brewster
- Geraldine Chaplin as Ella Zielinsky
- Edward Fox as Inspector Dermot Craddock (Jane's nephew)
- Charles Gray as Bates, the butler
- Richard Pearson as Doctor Haydock
- Wendy Morgan as Cherry
- Margaret Courtenay as Mrs Dolly Bantry
- Marella Oppenheim as Margot Bence
- Maureen Bennett as Heather Babcock
- Carolyn Pickles as Miss Giles
- Eric Dodson as the Major
- Charles Lloyd-Pack as the Vicar
- Thick Wilson as the Mayor
- Pat Nye as the Mayoress
- Peter Woodthorpe as the Scout Master
- Norman Wooland as the Medical Examiner
- Richard Leech as Director of Photography
- Sam Kydd as Film Technician
- Pierce Brosnan as actor playing Jamie (uncredited).

In addition, Anthony Steel, Dinah Sheridan, Nigel Stock, Hildegard Neil, John Bennett and Allan Cuthbertson are among the actors who appear in Murder at Midnight, a black-and-white "teaser" movie shown at the beginning of the film. Natalie Wood was originally chosen to play the role eventually played by Taylor.

Margaret Courtenay later appeared in the BBC TV adaptation The Mirror Crack'd from Side to Side starring Joan Hickson as Miss Marple.

== Production ==
=== Development ===
The novel was published in 1962. In 1977, Warner Bros. announced that Helen Hayes would play Miss Marple in adaptations of A Caribbean Mystery and The Mirror Crack'd.

Film rights for Mirror passed to John Brabourne and Richard Goodwin, who had previously produced adaptations of Murder on the Orient Express (1974) and Death on the Nile (1978). In 1979, they announced they would make the film starring Lansbury, who had played a support role in Death on the Nile and was appearing on stage in Sweeney Todd. Production would be put on hold until Lansbury finished her run in the musical. Nat Cohen who had made the decision to finance Orient Express and bought the rights to other Poirot novels felt it was a mistake to make a Miss Marple film.

In August 1979, Brabourne suffered leg injuries in a bomb blast that killed his mother, son, and father-in-law, Lord Mountbatten, but he proceeded with the picture.

Hamilton was given the job as director. He told the producers he was not a fan of Christie's novels and they said that is what would make him ideal for the film. Hamilton described the script as "awfully funny".

=== Casting ===
The casting director, Dyson Lovell, said that since the film was set in the 1950s "it seemed like a good idea to use stars from that era". Rock Hudson, Kim Novak, Tony Curtis and Taylor signed to play support roles. Taylor took over from Natalie Wood, who was cast but dropped out. Curtis made the film after being fired from the Broadway play I Ought to Be in Pictures.

It was Taylor's first film in three years. She said, "I have said for two years now that I would not go back to films unless it was something that absolutely intrigued me, and something that would not take me away from my husband for too long. I have found just that in The Mirror Crack'd and am longing to work with some very dear friends again."

There had been a series of Miss Marple films in the 1960s starring Margaret Rutherford. Hamilton said that Rutherford "was a divine clown but she was no more Miss Marple than... fly to the moon. We are doing Miss Christie's Miss Marple, a more serious person, a gossip, a bit of a snob. And she doesn't fall off her bicycle into the village duckpond".

Lansbury said she played the part of Marple "absolutely straight. I'm trying to get at the woman Agatha Christie created: an Edwardian maiden lady imbued with great humanity and a mind of tremendous breadth. She's very exactly described in the books as tall, pale-complexioned, with twinkling blue eyes and white hair - not a fat galumph of a creature at all. I base my performance on that. Also on the fact that she has tremendous alertness and curiosity allied to a great appetite for murder." She signed a three-picture deal, meaning the intention was to make two more Marples.

=== Filming ===
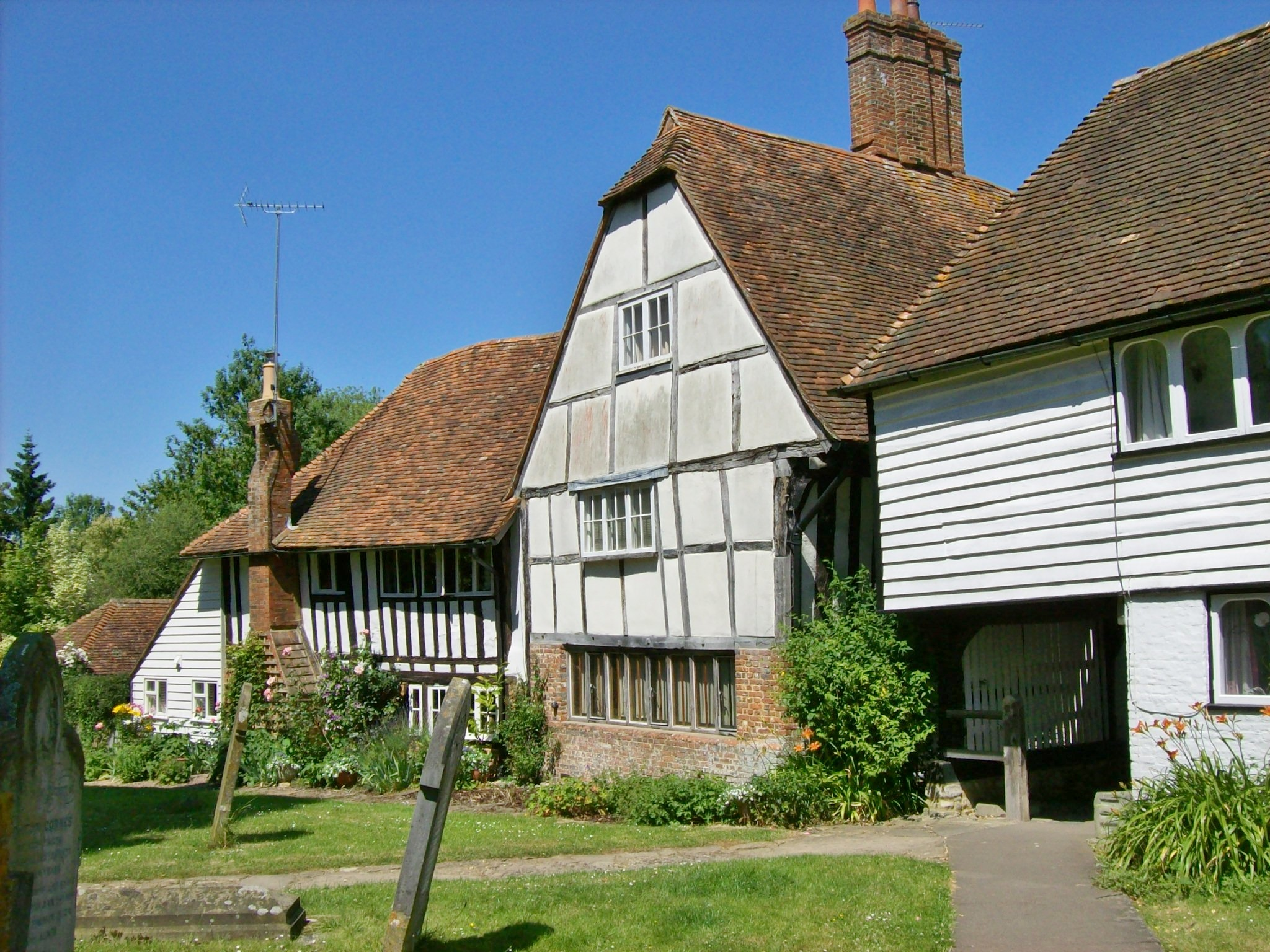
Smarden in Kent doubles as St Mary Mead

St Clere Estate, in Heaverham, near Sevenoaks in Kent, was used as Gossington Hall, the grand home of Marina Rudd (Taylor) and her husband Jason (Hudson). Ye Olde George Inn and a bridge on Church Street in Shoreham are both noticeable in the production, doubling as part of the village of St Mary Mead. The village of Smarden and St Michael's Church are also used to double as the village. Also throughout filming the "Thatched House" cottage in Smarden was used as Miss Marple's cottage. Smarden is located in the Ashford district of Kent, and the traditional thatched houses and village shops made it a perfect filming location. The film was shot on a 10-week schedule from 12 May to 18 July 1980.

"It was fun", said Curtis. "A piece of cake. I didn't have to get all sweaty like in Spartacus and I had a good time." "I never had so much fun making a movie", said Novak. "It may not be my greatest role, but I didn't have a studio executive breathing down my neck, dictating my every move."

Novak added that she and Taylor "...both had a lot of funny, bitchy lines to say to each other. In real life, that bitchiness rarely exists on a movie set, but actresses have certainly thought about it a lot. But they've never said it. That's why this movie was so much fun." However, her return to filmmaking was only temporary. "Doing something once in a while, like The Mirror Crack'd, is fine and it makes me feel like Cinderella at the ball. But as a steady diet — no way."

=== Title ===
The title — shortened from the one used for Christie's book — is part of a line from The Lady of Shalott by the English poet Alfred, Lord Tennyson:

Out flew the web and floated wide —
The mirror crack'd from side to side;
"The curse is come upon me", cried
The Lady of Shalott.

=== Inspiration theory ===
Biographers theorise that Christie used an incident in the real-life of the American film star Gene Tierney as the basis of the plot of The Mirror Crack'd from Side to Side. In June 1943, while pregnant with her first daughter, Tierney contracted German measles during her only appearance at the Hollywood Canteen. Due to Tierney's illness, her daughter was born deaf, partially blind with cataracts and severely developmentally disabled. Some time after the tragedy surrounding the birth, the actress learned from a fan who approached her for an autograph at a tennis party that the woman (who was then a member of the women's branch of the Marine Corps) had sneaked out of quarantine while sick with German measles to meet Tierney at her only Hollywood Canteen appearance. In her autobiography, Tierney wrote that after the woman had recounted her story, "I stood there for a very long minute. There was no point in telling her of the tragedy that had occurred. I turned and walked away very quickly. After that, I didn't care if I was ever again anyone's favorite actress".

The incident, as well as the circumstances under which the information was imparted to the actress, is repeated almost verbatim in Christie's story. Tierney's life experience had been well-publicized.

== Release ==
The Mirror Crack'd premiered in the United States on 18 December 1980.

=== Home media ===
Anchor Bay Entertainment released The Mirror Crack'd on DVD in 2001. Kino Lorber released a Blu-ray edition in North America on 1 September 2020, before issuing a 4K UHD Blu-ray on 20 January 2026.

== Reception ==
=== Box office ===
The film was considered a box office disappointment in the United States.

Lansbury never reprised her performance as Miss Marple, although she would play the similar role of Jessica Fletcher in TV's Murder, She Wrote.
