= Hannay (TV series) =

- Genre: Drama
- Created by: Michael Robson
- Based on: Richard Hannay, created by John Buchan
- Starring: Robert Powell
- Composer: Denis King
- Country of origin: United Kingdom
- Original language: English
- No. of series: 2
- No. of episodes: 13

Production
- Executive producers: Richard Bates; Lloyd Shirley
- Producer: Robert Banks Stewart
- Editors: Dave Lewinton; Colin Bocking; Roger Holmes; Nick Ames
- Running time: 652 minutes (average 50 minutes each, 60 minutes with commercials)
- Production company: Thames Television

Original release
- Network: ITV
- Release: 6 January 1988 – 14 March 1989

Hannay is a 1988 ITV television series, a prequel spin-off from the 1978 film version of John Buchan's 1915 novel The Thirty-Nine Steps. The film and series starred Robert Powell as Richard Hannay in the post Second Boer War years.

== Plot ==
In the series, Powell reprised the role of Hannay, an Edwardian era mining engineer from Rhodesia of Scottish origin. It features his adventures in pre-World War I Britain. These stories had little in common with John Buchan's novels about the character, although some character names are taken from his other novels.

=== Recurring ===
- Gavin Richards as Count Von Schwabing
- Christopher Scoular as Reggie Armitage
- Jill Meager as Eleanor Armitage

== Series overview ==
Series	Episodes	Originally released	
Series	Episodes	First released	Last released
1	6	6 January 1988	10 February 1988
2	7	31 January 1989	13 March 1989

== Episodes ==
=== Series 1 (1988) ===
No. overall	No. in series	Title	Directed by	Written by	Original release date
1	1	"The Fellowship of the Black Stone"	David Giles	Michael Robson	6 January 1988
After nearly thirty years in southern Africa, Richard Hannay has achieved recognition as an officer in military intelligence, a mining engineer and a successful prospector. Now he is returning to Britain to seek a bride, a home and a quiet life. But Europe is a cauldron of political intrigue and, amongst the old Empires, a new power is rapidly making its way — a power that resents Britain's mastery of the waves: Imperial Germany. Represented in London by the cunning and ruthless Count Von Schwabing, Germany is intent on causing trouble however and wherever she can — and Richard Hannay attracts trouble as a magnet attracts iron filings! Guest cast: Gavin Richards as Von Schwabing, Christopher Scoular as Reggie Armitage, Charles Gray as Commander Nevil, Philip McGough as Kupitt, Dominique Barnes as Lady Anne
2	2	"A Point of Honour"	Guy Slater	Robin Miller	13 January 1988
A chance encounter with a young lady on a train leads Hannay into a strange weekend of mistaken identity and danger. Notes: This episode is based on the short story A Point of Honour by Dornford Yates, from his book The Brother of Daphne. Guest cast: Terence Hardiman as Harman, Geraldine Alexander as Lady Madrigal Fitzjames
3	3	"Voyage into Fear"	Guy Slater	Gavin Richards	20 January 1988
The Governments of Great Britain and Imperial Germany are in a race to arm themselves with modern battleships, but Hannay's arch-enemy, von Schwabing, has a plan to ensure that his country is the winner. Guest cast: Gavin Richard as Von Schwabing, Nick Stringer as Brabazon, T. R. Bowen as Foreign Secretary, Jill Meager as Eleanor Armitage, Christopher Scoular as Reggie Armitage, Oliver Ford Davies as Russian Ambassador, Stephen Churchett as Rev. Martin Kennedy.
4	4	"Death With Due Notice"	Not credited	Michael Robson	27 January 1988
A quiet break in the country turns into a weekend of murder when Richard Hannay and Reggie Armitage discover they are targets for a demented killer. Notes: The episode credits don't list a director. Online sources identify, without provising evidence, either Guy Slater or David Giles as director. Guest cast: Jill Meager as Eleanor Armitage, Christopher Scoular as Reggie Armitage, Michael Culver as Major Edmund Philipson, Malcolm Tierney as Latimer, Colin Jeavons as Hugh Wootton, Selina Cadell as Miss Harkness, Dennis Lill as Inspector Bristow.
5	5	"Act of Riot"	Jeremy Summers	Michael Robson	3 February 1988
Hannay returns to Scotland to visit the village where he was born, but his arrival quickly brings him into dangerous conflict with the local inhabitants. Guest cast: Phyllis Logan as Alison Ross, Iain Cuthbertson as Sheriff Elliston, Hilton McRae as Lord Drysdale, Oliver Cotton as George Duxbury, Robert Brown as Robertson.
6	6	"The Hazard of the Die"	Jeremy Summers	Michael Robson	10 February 1988
When Hannay saves the life of a desperate young lady, he little realises how quickly this act of bravery will bring him face-to-face with his arch-enemy, von Schwabing. Guest cast: Gavin Richards as Von Schwabing, T. R. Bowen as Foreign Secretary, Christopher Scoular as Reggie Armitage, Gary Bond as Ned Jolifant, Michael Sheard as Perrin, Dermot Crowley as Dr. Forgan.

=== Series 2 (1989) ===
No. overall	No. in series	Title	Directed by	Written by	Original release date
7	1	"Coup de Grace"	Robert Reed	Richard Carpenter	31 January 1989
When Richard Hannay meets the beautiful Sybil Verney at a race meeting, he cannot foresee the web of lies and tragedy in which he will quickly become ensnared. Guest cast: Anthony Valentine as Sir Marcus Leonard, Joanna David as Sybil Verney, Diane Bull as Sal Alford, Leslie Schofield as Tennant.
8	2	"The Terrors of the Earth"	Ken Hannam	Michael Robson	7 February 1989
As tension mounts in Europe, the British Government prepares antidotes to possible germ warfare, and Richard Hannay finds himself at the centre of a demonic plot to steal them. Guest cast: Gavin Richards as Von Schwabing, Alex Kingston as Kirsten Lassen, Tony O'Callaghan as Sharpe.
9	3	"Double Jeopardy"	Henry Herbert	Michael Robson	14 February 1989
When Hannay is entrusted with the safe-keeping of a dozen diamonds, he little knows the danger and distress they will bring. Guest cast: Bernard Kay as Chief Inspector Rodier, Nigel Le Vaillant as Chief Inspector Rodier, David Conville as The Judge.
10	4	"The Good Samaritan"	Henry Herbert	Robin Miller	21 February 1989
The pleasures of travelling on the Trans-European Express from Venice are relished by celebrities, diplomats and holiday-makers alike, but for Richard Hannay the journey proves to be a nightmare. Guest cast: Sharon Maughan as Dore Nicholson, Marc Zuber as Auguste Kars, Peter Pacey as Boy Morland, Richard O'Callaghan as Bald-headed man, Henri Szeps as Police Inspector, David Haig as Conrad Smythe.
11	5	"That Rough Music"	Ken Hannam	Michael Robson	28 February 1989
On the death of his friend, Pelham Swinburne, Hannay inherits a walking-stick, field glasses and the lighthouse on a Fenland marsh .... but what is he to make of them all? Guest cast: Richenda Carey as Marigold Hudspith, Caroline Lee-Johnson as Vivien Laputa, Richard Pasco as Eugene Delahunty.
12	6	"The Confidence Man"	Robert Reed	Richard Carpenter	7 March 1989
When an East-End gang demand protection money for Sal Alford's music hall, she turns to Richard Hannay for help. Guest cast: Martin Clunes as Lord Amersham, Diane Bull as Sal Alford, Ron Pember as Charlie Peterson, Rebecca Lacey as Florence Peterson.
13	7	"Say The Bells of Shoreditch"	Guy Slater	Paul Wheeler	14 March 1989
When his goddaughter is jilted on her wedding day, Hannay finds himself searching for not just a missing bridegroom but also a shipment of gold. Guest cast: Jill Meager as Eleanor Armitage, Christopher Scoular as Reggie Armitage, Paul Rogers as Lord Berenger.

== Home media availability ==
Hannay was released in a four-disc Region 2 DVD set by Delta Visual Entertainment in February 2006.

Hannay was later released in a four-disc Region 2 DVD set by Network in September 2016.
