= Agatha Christie's Miss Marple =

Agatha Christie's Miss Marple may refer to one of two adaptations of Agatha Christie's Miss Marple series:

- Miss Marple, the 1984-1992 BBC adaptations featuring Joan Hickson
- Agatha Christie's Marple, the 2004-2013 ITV adaptations featuring Geraldine McEwan and Julia McKenzie
