= Ms. Ma, Nemesis =

2018 South Korean TV series

- Promotional poster
- Hangul: 미스 마: 복수의 여신
- Lit.: Miss Ma: Goddess of Revenge
- RR: Miseu Ma: boksuui yeosin
- MR: Misŭ Ma: poksuŭi yŏsin
- Genre: Mystery; Revenge
- Based on: Miss Marple's adventures by Agatha Christie (under licence from Agatha Christie Ltd.)
- Developed by: Hong Chang-wook
- Written by: Park Jin-woo
- Directed by: Min Yeon-hong; Lee Jung-hoon
- Starring: Yunjin Kim; Jung Woong-in; Ko Sung-hee; CNU
- Composer: Jin Myeongyong
- Country of origin: South Korea
- Original language: Korean
- No. of episodes: 32 (Note: In order to circumvent Korean laws that prevent commercial breaks in the middle of an episode, what would previously have been aired as single 70 minute episodes are now being repackaged as two 35 minute episodes, with two episodes being shown each night with a commercial break between the two.)

Production
- Executive producer: Jay Sun-hwan Yoon
- Running time: 35 minutes
- Production company: Good Production Co.

Original release
- Network: SBS TV
- Release: October 6 – November 24, 2018

Related
- Agatha Christie's Marple (ITV, UK); Miss Marple (BBC, UK)

Ms. Ma, Nemesis (Korean: 미스 마: 복수의 여신) is a South Korean television series starring Yunjin Kim, Jung Woong-in, Ko Sung-hee and CNU. It is based on Agatha Christie's Nemesis. The series aired four consecutive episodes on Saturday on SBS TV from October 6 to November 24, 2018.

Aside from the title story Nemesis, the plot of the show also adapts other Christie stories, most notably The Moving Finger, The Mirror Crack'd from Side to Side, A Murder is Announced, and The Body in the Library.

== Synopsis ==
Ms. Ma is sent to jail after being accused of killing her daughter. She escapes in order to find the real murderer and starts solving other cases.

== Cast ==
=== Main ===
- Yunjin Kim as Ma Ji-won

A mystery writer.

- Jung Woong-in as Han Tae-kyu

A detective in charge of Ms. Ma's case.

- Ko Sung-hee as Seo Eun-ji

A woman who introduces herself as Ms. Ma's niece and then lives at her house.

- Choi Kwang-je as Ko Mal-koo

A retired gangster who works as a loan creditor.

=== Recurring ===
- CNU as Bae Do-hwan

A young police officer stationed at the village where Ms. Ma and Eun-ji are currently staying.

- Myung Gye-nam as Jang Il-koo
- Song Young-kyu as Jang Cheol-min
- Kim Young-a as Yang Mi-hee
- Sung Ji-ru as Jo Chang-gil
- Moon Hee-kyung as Madame Park
- Hwang Suk-jung as CEO Oh
- Yoon Hae-young as Lee Jung-hee
- Lee Ye-won as Jang Min-seo

Ms. Ma's deceased daughter.

- Choi Seung-hoon as Choi Woo-joon
- Lee Myung-hoon as Heo Joo Yeong

== Original soundtrack ==
Ms. Ma, Nemesis OST

Soundtrack album by Various artists
- Released: 2018
- Genre: Soundtrack
- Languages: Korean; English
- Labels: Vlending Co., Ltd.; SBS Contents Hub

=== Part 1 ===
Released on October 6, 2018
No.	Title	Lyrics	Music	Artist	Length
1.	"Alone"	D'Day	KZ; Gom Dol-goon; JeA (Brown Eyed Girls)	JeA (Brown Eyed Girls)	3:37
2.	"Alone" (Inst.)		KZ; Gom Dol-goon; JeA (Brown Eyed Girls)		3:37
Total length:					7:14

=== Part 2 ===
Released on October 13, 2018
No.	Title	Lyrics	Music	Artist	Length
1.	"My Memory"	Jin Myung-yong	Jin Myung-yong	leeSA	3:15
2.	"Alone" (Inst.)		Jin Myung-yong		3:15
Total length:					6:30

=== Part 3 ===
Released on October 20, 2018
No.	Title	Lyrics	Music	Artist	Length
1.	"Flower"	DarooStar; Jay Hong (Jam Factory)	DarooStar; Jay Hong (Jam Factory)	UP10TION (Wei, Sunyoul, Hwanhee)	3:35
2.	"Flower" (Inst.)		DarooStar; Jay Hong (Jam Factory)		3:35
Total length:					7:10

=== Part 4 ===
Released on November 3, 2018
No.	Title	Lyrics	Music	Artist	Length
1.	"Do You Know Back Then" (그댄 아나요)	KZ; Taebongie	KZ; Taebongie	SALTNPAPER	3:51
2.	"Do You Know Back Then" (Inst.)		KZ; Taebongie		3:51
Total length:					7:42

=== Part 5 ===
Released on November 10, 2018
No.	Title	Lyrics	Music	Artist	Length
1.	"Run Away"	Kim Ho-kyung	1601	Yi Sung-yol	4:06
2.	"Run Away" (Inst.)		1601		4:06
Total length:					8:12

=== Part 6 ===
Released on November 17, 2018
No.	Title	Lyrics	Music	Artist	Length
1.	"Hourglass"	YEIN	Master Class, YEIN	YEIN	3:47
2.	"Hourglass" (Inst.)		Master Class, YEIN		3:47
Total length:					7:34

== Ratings ==
- In the table below, the blue numbers represent the lowest ratings and the red numbers represent the highest ratings.

Ep.	Original broadcast date	Average audience share
Ep.	Original broadcast date	AGB Nielsen
Ep.	Original broadcast date	Nationwide
1	October 6, 2018	5.8%
2	October 6, 2018	7.3%
3	October 6, 2018	8.3%
4	October 6, 2018	9.1%
5	October 13, 2018	5.3%
6	October 13, 2018	6.1%
7	October 13, 2018	6.3%
8	October 13, 2018	6.6%
9	October 20, 2018	2.1%
10	October 20, 2018	5.1%
11	October 20, 2018	5.5%
12	October 20, 2018	5.8%
13	October 27, 2018	5.4%
14	October 27, 2018	6.3%
15	October 27, 2018	6.4%
16	October 27, 2018	6.9%
17	November 3, 2018	4.7%
18	November 3, 2018	5.1%
19	November 3, 2018	5.5%
20	November 3, 2018	5.6%
21	November 10, 2018	4.5%
22	November 10, 2018	4.8%
23	November 10, 2018	5.2%
24	November 10, 2018	5.2%
25	November 17, 2018	3.9%
26	November 17, 2018	5.3%
27	November 17, 2018	5.9%
28	November 17, 2018	6.6%
29	November 24, 2018	5.4%
30	November 24, 2018	6.4%
31	November 24, 2018	7.4%
32	November 24, 2018	8.6%
Average		5.9%

== Awards and nominations ==
Year	Award	Category	Recipient	Result	Ref.
2018	SBS Drama Awards	Top Excellence Award, Actress in a Daily and Weekend Drama	Yunjin Kim	Nominated	
2018	SBS Drama Awards	Excellence Award, Actor in a Daily and Weekend Drama	Jung Woong-in	Won	
2018	SBS Drama Awards	Best Supporting Actress	Ko Sung-hee	Nominated	
2018	SBS Drama Awards	Best Supporting Actress	Moon Hee-kyung	Nominated	
