= The Body in the Library (film) =

1984 television film by Silvio Narizzano

The Body in the Library is a 3-part 1984 television film adaptation of Agatha Christie's 1942 detective novel The Body in the Library, co-produced by the BBC and the A&E Network. The film uses an adapted screenplay by T. R. Bowen and was directed by Silvio Narizzano. It was the first film presented in the British television series Miss Marple starring Joan Hickson in the title role and premiered in three parts from 26 to 28 December 1984 on BBC One. In the United States, the film was first broadcast on 4 January 1986 as a part of PBS's Mystery!. In his review in The New York Times, critic John J. O'Connor wrote:

Miss Christie would no doubt approve of Joan Hickson, the veteran British character actress who plays Miss Marple... This BBC/Arts & Entertainment co-production offers an especially good example of Agatha Christie in adaptation. The characters are nicely realized and the suspense holds. Miss Hickson is lovely, neither as awesome as Miss Rutherford nor as overly cute as Helen Hayes. And the supporting cast is admirable, particularly Gwen Watford as Dolly and David Horovitch as Inspector Slack. As someone notes about the case, "you'll have to admit it has all the bizarre elements of a cheap thriller." Once hooked, you won't be able to turn it off.

The Body in the Library was repeated on BBC Four in September and October 2013 and subsequently.

== Plot ==
Miss Marple helps her neighbours the Bantrys when a girl is found dead in their library. The girl is traced to a seaside resort and the desperate family of a wealthy old man.

== Cast ==
- Joan Hickson as Miss Marple
- David Horovitch as Detective Inspector Slack
- Gwen Watford as Dolly Bantry
- Moray Watson as Colonel Bantry
- Frederick Jaeger as Colonel Melchett
- Valentine Dyall as Lorrimer
- Anthony Smee as Basil Blake
- Debbie Arnold as Dinah Lee
- Andrew Cruickshank as Conway Jefferson
- Ciaran Madden as Adelaide Jefferson
- Keith Drinkel as Mark Gaskell
- Hugh Walters as Mr Prescott
- Jess Conrad as Raymond Starr
- Trudie Styler as Josie Turner
- John Moffatt as Edwards
- Arthur Bostrom as George Bartlett
- Stephen Churchett as Major Reeve
- Astra Sheridan as Pamela Reeve
- Raymond Francis as Sir Henry Clithering
- Ian Brimble as Detective Constable Lake
- John Bardon as PC Palk
- Anne Rutter as Mrs Palk
- Karin Foley as Mary
- Colin Higgins as Malcolm
- Sarah Whitlock as WPC
- Andrew Downer as Peter Carmody
- Sally Jane Jackson as Ruby Keene
- Kathleen Breck as Bridget
- Martyn Read as Hugo McLean
- Karen Seacombe as Florrie Small
- Sydney Livingstone as Mr Brogan
- John Evans as Inch
- Jacqui Munro as the body
