= The Last Song (TV series) =

Television series

- Genre: Sitcom
- Written by: Carla Lane
- Directed by: Sydney Lotterby
- Starring: Geoffrey Palmer; Caroline Blakiston; Hetty Baynes; Barbara Flynn
- Country of origin: United Kingdom
- Original language: English
- No. of series: 2
- No. of episodes: 13

Production
- Producer: Sydney Lotterby
- Running time: 30 minutes
- Production company: BBC

Original release
- Network: BBC 2
- Release: 3 November 1981 – 1 April 1983

The Last Song is a British television sitcom which aired on BBC Two in two series of six episodes between 1981 and 1983. It was written by Carla Lane. In the first series, Leo Bannister tries to juggle his life between his ex-wife, his two daughters, and his new, younger girlfriend. In the second series, he tries to reconcile with his wife.

== Cast ==
- Geoffrey Palmer as Leo Bannister (13 episodes)
- Caroline Blakiston as Alice Bannister (13 episodes)
- Hetty Baynes as Jane Bannister (10 episodes)
- Gay Wilde as Alison Bannister (9 episodes)
- Nina Thomas as Liz Carroll (6 episodes)
- Barbara Flynn as Shirley (6 episodes)

== Bibliography ==
- Horace Newcomb. Encyclopedia of Television. Routledge, 2014.
