= James Saxon (actor) =

English actor (1955–2003)

- Born: William James Smyth; 12 June 1955; Swindon, Wiltshire, England
- Died: 2 July 2003 (aged 48); Mere, Wiltshire, England
- Occupation: Actor
- Years active: 1980–2003

William James Smyth (12 June 1955 – 2 July 2003), better known by his stage name James Saxon, was an English character actor. He began his career in British television productions in the early 1980s.

== Early life ==
Saxon was born William James Smyth on 12 June 1955, in the town of Swindon in the county of Wiltshire. He trained to be an actor at the Royal Academy of Dramatic Art, in London.

== Career ==
Saxon began his career on television in the series Jukes of Piccadilly in 1980 before landing the part of Morris Hardacre in a period-piece social comedy series, set in 1930s Northern England, entitled Brass, a part he played in all three series. As the decade progressed, he appeared in numerous television productions, playing the role of an American airman, Sergeant Elmer Jones, in the series We'll Meet Again (1982), and Oscar Botcherby in the 1985 Doctor Who serial The Two Doctors. In 1986, he played the character of Phillip Crane in the BBC series Brush Strokes and, in the same year, performed in several episodes of the children's television series Roland Rat: The Series, in the guise of D'Arcey DeFarcey. In 1986, in his first foray into cinema, he played the character of Bertie in the historical science-fiction adventure film Biggles: Adventures in Time. In 1987, he played the role of Ellerman in the crime thriller cinema film A Prayer for the Dying and, in the same year, he performed in as Joseph Sedley in a television adaptation of Vanity Fair. In 1988, he played Sir Toby Belch in an English television film adaptation of Shakespeare's Twelfth Night (1988). He appeared in the role of a police officer in several episodes of the television crime series The Paradise Club (1989).

In 1991, Saxon played the role of Victor Crosby, a Thatcherite Tory Member of Parliament, in A Labour of Love, an episode of the highly-successful political satire television series The New Statesman, alongside Rik Mayall as Alan B'Stard. Continuing to work regularly through the 1990s in a multiplicity of dramatic roles in British television, he appeared in, among other productions in this period, the role of Major Vaughan in the Napoleonic era television film Sharpe's Honour (1994). He was a support player in the biopic of Henry Purcell in the cinema film England My England (1995). The next year, he played the Prince Regent in the television film Poldark. In 1998, he voice acted the part of Captain Pugwash in a cartoon television series. From 1997–1998, he appeared as Fuzzy Brightons, a character in several episodes of the crime series McCallum. In 1998, he played the part of Chabouillet in the cinema film Les Miserables. In 1999, he played the character of Pothinus in the two episodes of the period piece drama series Cleopatra.

With the beginning of the new century, there was a decline in the regularity of Saxon's appearance in television as he began to concentrate more upon his theatrical career. He performed a support part in the American television film The Prince and the Pauper (2000). His final appearance on English television was in the role of Inspector Bullstrode in an episode of the BBC crime/mystery series Jonathan Creek in 2001. His last screen performance was in the television film Dr Jekyll and Mr Hyde, filmed in Lithuania in 2002, playing the role of Dr Johnston. In late 2002, Saxon performed at The Strand Theatre in London's West End, in the play Mrs Warren's Profession.

== Death ==
Saxon died on 2 July 2003 from a heart attack and brain aneurysm at the age of 48 at Mere in Wiltshire, whilst having a day off from a season at the Chichester Festival Theatre.

== Selected filmography ==
Year	Title	Role	Notes
1985	Doctor Who	Oscar Botcherby	Serial: The Two Doctors
1986	Biggles	Bertie	
1987	A Prayer for the Dying	Ellerman	
1995	England My England	Vyner	
1998	Les Miserables	Chabouillet	
2000	The Prince and the Pauper	Abbot	Final film role
