= Joanna Hole =

British actress

Joanna Hole (born 1955) is a British actress, best known for her role as Sally Markham in the 1980s BBC television drama series Tenko.

Other credits include: A Very Peculiar Practice, Miss Marple, The Upper Hand, Judge John Deed, Holby City, and The Bill.

She also appeared in Gold, the third series in the Band Of Gold series written by Kay Mellor.

== Filmography ==
=== Film ===
Year	Title	Role	Notes
1994	Home Away from Home	Sloanie neighbour	Short
2006	Half Light	Mary Murray	
2006	Dark Corners	Elaine Jordan	
2012	Cheerful Weather for the Wedding	Miss Spoon	
2014	Effie Gray	Mrs. McPhail	

== Television ==
Year	Title	Role	Notes
1980	Mixed Blessings	Colette	Episode: "Away from It All"
1981–1982	Tenko	Sally Markham	Main role (series 1–2)
1986	Gems	Veronica West	Episodes: "2.3", "2.4", "2.7", "2.8"
1987	Miss Marple (TV series) Nemesis	Madge (The Tour Guide)	Two-part episode
1989	Anything More Would Be Greedy	Fiona Holmes-Coppitt	Episode: "Realizing Assets"
1990	The Manageress	Dorothy	Episode: "A Match for Anyone"
1993, 2006	The Bill	Jill Craig, Sandra Parker	Episodes: "Outbreak", "Sequence of Events: Part 2"
1995	The Upper Hand	Elaine	Episodes: "Moonlighting", "Second Thoughts"
1997	Holding the Baby	Kay	Episode: "1.3"
1997	Gold	Amanda	Episodes: "She's Back: Parts 1 & 2", "The Catch: Parts 1 & 2"
1999	Extremely Dangerous	Jenny Gregg	Episodes: "1.1", "1.3"
2000, 2006	Holby City	Brenda Flynn, June Humphries	Episodes: "First Impressions", "The Unforgiven"
2007	Waking the Dead	Gloria Lennon	Episodes: "Double Bind: Parts 1 & 2"
2008	Londyńczycy	Janis	Episodes: "1.5", "1.6"
2009	Law & Order: UK	Phoebe Baxter	Episode: "Unloved"
2012	Public Enemies	Mappa Chair	Episode: "1.2"
2013	Frankie	Josie Marchant	Episode: "1.3"
2016	Thirteen	Dr. Erica Young	TV miniseries
2019	Is This Sexual Harassment?	Judge	TV documentary
