= The Mirror Crack'd from Side to Side =

1962 mystery novel by Agatha Christie

- First edition (UK)
- Author: Agatha Christie
- Language: English
- Series: Miss Marple novels
- Genre: Crime novel
- Publisher: Collins Crime Club
- Publication date: 12 November 1962
- Publication place: United Kingdom
- Pages: 256
- Preceded by: 4:50 from Paddington
- Followed by: A Caribbean Mystery

The Mirror Crack'd from Side to Side, a mystery novel by Agatha Christie, was published in the UK in 1962 and a year later in the US under the title The Mirror Crack'd. The story features amateur detective Miss Marple solving a mystery in St Mary Mead. The central plot device providing motivation for the initial murder derives from a real-life event in the life of the American actress Gene Tierney.

Reviews of the book on publication were respectful and generally positive. The novel has been adapted many times for television, film, radio and the stage.

== Plot ==
While walking in her home village of St Mary Mead, Miss Jane Marple trips and is helped to her feet by Heather Badcock, a woman who lives nearby. Realising the fall has shaken Miss Marple, Heather invites her in for a cup of tea. She chatters excitedly about the famous American film actress Marina Gregg, new owner of nearby Gossington Hall, previously the home of Miss Marple's friend Dolly Bantry. Heather declares herself a 'terrific fan'. She recalls that once, as a teenager working in Bermuda, she had been so excited to have the chance to meet Marina Gregg at a fête and get an autograph that she went despite running a temperature.

Marina and her husband, the film producer Jason Rudd, host a village fête in support of St John Ambulance. Guests include Dolly Bantry and the film man Ardwyck Fenn. Also invited are a number of St John Ambulance officials, including Heather Badcock and her husband Arthur. Margot Bence, a young press photographer, takes pictures.

Heather corners Marina and reminds her of that exciting day many years ago in Bermuda when she had sneaked out of her sickbed specially to get an autograph. Marina is polite, but her gaze wanders over Heather's shoulder. Suddenly, a strange look crosses her face. A short time later, Heather collapses and dies. Later, recounting the events to Miss Marple, Dolly Bantry quotes lines from the poem "The Lady of Shalott" (in which a curse falls upon the poem's heroine) to describe the look she observed.

Local police officer Frank Cornish and Chief Inspector Dermot Craddock of Scotland Yard investigate. They discover that Heather had died of an overdose of a tranquilliser known as 'Calmo' that had been added to her daiquiri. Her husband reports that someone jogged Heather's elbow and she dropped her glass, splashing Marina's frock. Marina was very nice about it and gave her her own drink in replacement, saying that she hadn't touched it yet. Jason had never considered that his wife might have been the intended target, but now discovers that she had been receiving death threats.

Craddock looks into Marina's past. Desperate to have a child, she had adopted three before giving birth to a mentally disabled son and suffering a nervous breakdown. The three children were moved elsewhere, and Marina never saw them again, though they were well provided for. One of those children is the photographer, Margot Bence. While conceding that she hates her adoptive mother, Margot denies attempting to poison anyone.

Ardwyck Fenn tells Craddock he received an anonymous phone call accusing him of killing Heather. He recognized the caller as Jason's secretary, Ella Zielinsky. Shortly afterwards, Ella dies after the atomizer she uses for her hay fever is poisoned with cyanide; and Giuseppe, Marina's butler, is shot after spending the day in London where he deposits £500 into his bank account.

Gladys, one of the servers at the fête, reports seeing Marina deliberately spilling Heather's drink down her own frock. The police try to interview Gladys, but she has just departed for a holiday in Bournemouth. At Gossington Hall, Marina dies from an overdose.

Miss Marple explains how she deduced that Marina was the murderer. Heather had been ill with German measles when she sought Marina's autograph in Bermuda. Marina, in the early stages of pregnancy, had contracted the disease, which led to her son being born disabled. The look on Marina's face was triggered by a Madonna and Child painting on the wall behind Heather. Marina had put Calmo in her own drink, jolted Heather's arm, and then given her the drugged replacement cocktail. To cover her crime, Marina had posed as the target of a murder attempt, writing the threatening notes herself. She killed Ella and Giuseppe after they guessed her involvement and blackmailed her. Miss Marple had sent Gladys away to prevent her becoming Marina's next victim.

Miss Marple implies to Jason that he administered Marina's overdose himself, to prevent her from taking another life. He simply comments on his wife's beauty and the suffering she endured.

== Literary significance and reception ==
Francis Iles (Anthony Berkeley Cox) was somewhat muted in his praise in his review in The Guardian of 7 December 1962 when he said,

"she has of course thought up one more brilliant little peg on which to hang her plot, but the chief interest to me of The Mirror Crack'd from Side to Side was the shrewd exposition of what makes a female film star tick the way she does tick. And though one could accept a single coincidence concerning that married couple, the second and quite wildly improbable one tends to destroy faith in the story – still more so since it leads nowhere at all."

Maurice Richardson of The Observer of 11 November 1962 summed up, "A moderate Christie; bit diffuse and not so taut as some; still fairly easy to read, though."

Kirkus Reviews gave a short review noting Miss Marple's complaints about the limits imposed on her by getting old, yet nothing stops her mind from working well. The novel is summed up by this upbeat remark: "It was her prying curiosity - her gift of putting odd bits together to form a picture that gave the locals and Scotland Yard the proper solution. Long life to her."

Robert Barnard, writing in 1990, said this novel was "The last of the true English village mysteries in Christie's output, and one of the best of her later books. Film milieu superimposed on the familiar St Mary Mead background." He went on to remark that "Like most Marples this is not rich in clueing, but the changes in village life and class structure since the war are detailed in a knowledgeable and fairly sympathetic way."

The novel was on Anthony Boucher's list for 1963 of Best Crime Fiction of the Year.

== Title ==
The novel's title comes from the poem The Lady of Shalott by Alfred, Lord Tennyson.

Out flew the web and floated wide –
The mirror crack'd from side to side;
"The curse is come upon me," cried
The Lady of Shalott.

== Principal characters ==
- Miss Marple: an elderly but very astute sleuth who is recovering from an illness. Lives in St Mary Mead.
- Dolly Bantry: Miss Marple's friend, formerly owner of Gossington Hall (in The Body in the Library).
- Marina Gregg: a famous film star. New owner of Gossington Hall.
- Heather Badcock: a worker with the St John Ambulance corps. The first victim in the case.
- Arthur Badcock: Heather's husband. Previously married to Marina before she became famous.
- Jason Rudd: Marina's husband, a film director.
- Lola Brewster: an American actress.
- Ardwyck Fenn: an American film man who was once wildly in love with Marina.
- Ella Zielinsky: Jason's secretary. The second victim in the case.
- Giuseppe: a butler at Gossington Hall. The third victim in the case.
- Gladys Dixon: a seamstress who works at the film studio's canteen.
- Margot Bence: a portrait photographer at the fête. Adopted by Marina as a baby.
- Dr Gilchrist: Gregg's doctor, who lives at the Hall.
- Dermot Craddock: Chief Inspector at Scotland Yard.
- William Tiddler: a sergeant assisting Craddock.
- Frank Cornish: a local police inspector.
- Dr Haydock: Miss Marple's doctor in St Mary Mead.
- Miss Knight: Miss Marple's carer, sent by Marple's nephew Raymond West to help during her recuperation.
- Mrs Cherry Baker: Miss Marple's cleaner.
- Jim Baker: Cherry's husband, who does odd jobs for Miss Marple.

== Developing the character of Marina Gregg ==
The ophthalmologist who first described cataracts in congenital rubella syndrome was Norman Gregg, and the journal Clinical and Experimental Ophthalmology described the choice of surname as "one of [Christie's] most subtle clues to identify the murderer".

The official site of the Agatha Christie estate suggests that, in writing Gregg, Christie had been influenced by the life of the American actress Gene Tierney. Tierney had contracted German measles while pregnant with her first child, during her only appearance at the Hollywood Canteen in June 1943, resulting in the baby developing congenital rubella syndrome. The deaf, partially blind and developmentally disabled child was later institutionalised in a psychiatric hospital. More than a year after the birth, a woman asked Tierney for an autograph at a garden party. She said that, two years earlier while ill with German measles, she had skipped quarantine in order to visit the Hollywood Canteen and meet Tierney. Tierney described the event in her autobiography 16 years after Christie wrote the novel.

== Publication history ==
The Star Weekly Novel, a Toronto newspaper supplement, serialised the novel in two abridged instalments from 9 to 16 March 1963 under the title The Mirror Crack'd, with each issue containing a cover illustration by Gerry Sevier.

== Adaptations ==
=== Television ===
An adaptation of the novel was made by BBC television in 1992 as part of its series Miss Marple with the title role played by Joan Hickson, and starring Claire Bloom as Marina Gregg and Glynis Barber as Lola Brewster. The novel was the final adaptation for the BBC series Miss Marple.

ITV Studios and WGBH Boston produced another adaptation in 2010 for the Marple television series, starring Julia McKenzie as Miss Marple, with Joanna Lumley reprising her role as Dolly Bantry, Lindsay Duncan as Marina Gregg and Hannah Waddingham as Lola Brewster. Investigating the murder along with Miss Marple is Inspector Hewitt, played by Hugh Bonneville. The novel was adapted as a 2017 episode of the French television series Les Petits Meurtres d'Agatha Christie.

TV Asahi adapted the novel in 2018 starring Ikki Sawamura and Hitomi Kuroki, with the title Two Nights Drama Special: Murder of the Great Actress – The Mirror Crack'd From Side to Side (Japanese: アガサ・クリスティ 二夜連続ドラマスペシャル 大女優殺人事件～鏡は横にひび割れて～) as the second night, the first night featuring 4:50 from Paddington.

- Cast:
  - Ikki Sawamura – Chief Inspector Ryuya Shokokuji, based on Jane Marple and Dermot Craddock
  - Yoshiyoshi Arakawa – Inspector Banpei Tatara
  - Erena Mizusawa – Inspector Fueko Misaki
  - Hitomi Kuroki – Madoka Irodori, based on Marina Gregg
  - Ikko Furuya – Akira Kaido, based on Jason Rudd
  - Naomi Zaizen – Sagiri Asakaze, based on Lola Brewster
  - Masahiko Tsugawa – Hiraomi Danbara, based on Ardwyck Fenn
  - Mari Nishio – Shimeko Akada, based on Ella Zielinsky
  - Tomoharu Hasegawa – Toshiro Inden, based on Giuseppe
  - Ryuji Katagiri – Kansuke Aramaki, based on Dr Gilchrist
  - Kami Hiraiwa – Rin Kannokoji, based on Heather Badcock
  - Takeo Nakahara – Koki Kannokoji, based on Arthur Badcock
  - Haruna Kawaguchi – Kosame Taniguchi, based on Margot Bence
  - Hayato Isomura – Matsubushi Matsuda, based on Margot Bence and Gladys Dixon
  - Narumi Fukuda – Hinata Hanakage, also based on Margot Bence
  - Zuimaru Awashima – Sosuke Aiba, based on Donald McNeil

The novel was also adapted as part of the Korean television series Ms. Ma, Nemesis.

=== Film ===
The novel was adapted for a 1980 feature film with Angela Lansbury in the role of Miss Marple. The film's co-stars were Elizabeth Taylor as Marina and Kim Novak as Lola Brewster, and the cast also included Rock Hudson and Tony Curtis. The film was released as The Mirror Crack'd, the shortened US book title.

Film director and screenwriter Rituparno Ghosh created a Bengali language version of Christie's story as Shubho Mahurat, which reset the story in the film industry of Kolkata. In this version, Sharmila Tagore played the ageing star Padmini, the counterpart to Christie's Marina Gregg. The 2003 movie features Rakhee Gulzar in the role of the equivalent of Miss Marple.

=== Radio ===
A radio adaptation was made by the BBC in 1998. June Whitfield played Miss Marple, and Gayle Hunnicutt Marina Gregg, in a 90-minute version by Michael Bakewell.

=== Stage ===
The novel was adapted as a play by Rachel Wagstaff in 2019, premiering that year in a UK tour, and was revived for another UK tour in 2022.
