= A Caribbean Mystery (film) =

1983 television film directed by Robert Lewis

- Genre: Crime; Mystery; Drama
- Based on: A Caribbean Mystery by Agatha Christie
- Written by: Sue Grafton; Steven Humphrey
- Directed by: Robert Michael Lewis
- Starring: Helen Hayes
- Music by: Lee Holdridge
- Countries of origin: United Kingdom; United States
- Original language: English

Production
- Producer: Stan Margulies
- Production location: Santa Barbara, California
- Cinematography: Ted Voigtlander
- Editor: Les Green
- Running time: 92 minutes
- Production company: Warner Bros. Television

Original release
- Network: CBS
- Release: October 22, 1983

A Caribbean Mystery is a 1983 American made-for-television mystery film based on the 1964 Agatha Christie novel of the same name and starring Helen Hayes as Miss Marple.

== Cast ==
- Helen Hayes as Miss Jane Marple
- Barnard Hughes as Mr. Rafiel
- Jameson Parker as Tim Kendall
- Season Hubley as Molly Kendall
- Swoosie Kurtz as Ruth Walter
- Cassie Yates as "Lucky" Dyson
- Stephen Macht as Greg Dyson
- Zakes Mokae as Captain Daventry
- Beth Howland as Evelyn Hillingdon
- Maurice Evans as Major Geoffrey Palgrave
- Lynne Moody as Victoria Johnson
- George Innes as Edward Hillingdon
- Brock Peters as Dr. Graham

== Production ==
Stan Margulies had the rights to eight Christie books. He made a TV movie of Christie's Murder Is Easy. It was a success and the Christie estate liked it, enabling him to get the rights to Caribbean Mystery. He made it around the time of another Christie adaptation, Sparkling Cyanide. Margulies had to update the stories to the present day because he was unable to do period pieces on a TV movie budget. Because the films were made for American TV, he also insisted on the freedom to cast at least one American actor in the cast. The script was adapted by novelist Sue Grafton and Steven Humphrey.

Marguiles offered Hayes the part of Marple after using her in Murder Is Easy. Hayes said she turned down the role at first because she "adored" the character of Marple "and I didn't want to follow Margaret Rutherford... I can't be that funny."

=== Filming ===
The film was shot in Santa Barbara. Hayes said "a lot of things were against us. Like frigid cold and rain every day. We worked indoors while it poured and poured, and when it stopped, we tried to make it look like the tropics. I was wearing light clothes over thermal underwear."

Hayes found the dialogue for Marple difficult. "She has all the summing up, all the exposition. All those lines! I told the producer... 'I can't learn all that stuff.' One of the nice parts about being a star is that the lesser-paid actors have to do the exposition. I haven't done exposition for 50 years."

== Reception ==
The New York Times said the film "has its engaging moments, thanks primarily to an exceptionally good cast."

The film was popular with viewers. Hayes reprised her role as Marple in Murder with Mirrors (1985).

== Legacy ==
The film was seen on TV by writer Richard Levinson who noted its ratings success. He thought of doing a regular mystery show about a Marple-like detective, who was a mystery writer like Agatha Christie. This led to Murder, She Wrote.
