= Jill Meager =

English actor, artist and painter

Jill Meager is an English actor, artist and performance coach .

== Career ==
Meager studied modern languages at Trinity Hall, Cambridge. She worked for several years as an actress before training as a psychodynamic counsellor. She also worked as a stand-up comedienne before studying fine art at the Putney School of Art and Design

=== As an actor ===
Meager has appeared in many roles on television and in film, including Lucy Eyelesbarrow in 4:50 from Paddington, one of the BBC's adaptations of Miss Marple novels, in 1987. She played Katherine Chipping in the 1984 BBC adaptation of the book Goodbye, Mr. Chips. She played opposite Charles Dance in the BBC spy thriller The Secret Servant by Gavin Lyall. She had a role in the "unofficial" James Bond film Never Say Never Again in 1983, and starred opposite Alan Bates and Lambert Wilson in the feature film Sins of a Father based on a Graham Swift novel. Her other television appearances include Taggart, Bergerac and Hannay.

=== As an artist ===
She works as a wildlife artist and has regular UK exhibitions of her work. See jillmeager.com

As a Performance Coach

She coaches in speech writing, media and performance training. She has worked in many of the major United Kingdom advertising agencies, UK and US production companies and media organisations, as well as FTSE 100 companies.

Most recently she has been working as a speech coach in frontline UK politics for the Labour Party
