= Anthony Smee =

British theatre producer and actor

- Born: Anthony Smee; 22 November 1949 (age 76)
- Other name: Tony Smee
- Occupations: Theatre producer; writer; stage, radio, television, and film actor
- Years active: 1972–present
- Children: Carl Hester, Vivien Smee

Anthony Smee (22 November 1949), also known as Tony Smee, is an English theatre producer, writer, and actor who has worked in radio, theatre, television, and film since 1972.

== Background ==
=== Education ===
Smee trained at the Rose Bruford College.

== Career ==
=== Theatre ===
Mr Maugham at Home (2010–2014)

=== Partial filmography ===
- Return of the Jedi (1983) - Imperial Bunker Commander (uncredited)
- The English Patient (1996) - Beach Interrogation Officer
- Hilary and Jackie (1998) - BBC Nabob
- Parting Shots (1998) - George
- You're the Stranger Here (2009) - Bruno

=== Partial television ===
- Colditz (1974) - Captain Able
- Z-Cars (1977) - Mick
- Secret Army (1977) - Vidler
- Crown Court (1978) - Ben Hare
- The Sweeney (1978) - Army Lt
- House of Caradus (7 episodes, 1979) - Lionel Caradus
- Coronation Street (1981) - John Ridley
- Wet Job (1981) - Thorne
- Rentaghost (1982, 1984) - Policeman
- Miss Marple "The Body in the Library" (1984) - Basil Blake
- Hold the Back Page (1985) - The Brigadier
- Brookside (6 episodes, 1982–1986) - Keith Tench
- Inspector Morse The Silent World of Nicholas Quinn (1987) - Roope
- Home to Roost (1987)
- The Black and Blue Lamp (1988)
- Testimony of a Child (1989)
- Brass (11 episodes, 1984–1990) - Guy Baggers
- Amongst Barbarians (1990) - Smee
- Bergerac (1991) - Gerald Wenslow
- Love Hurts (1992) - Businessman
- Framed (2 episodes, 1992) - Superintendent
- To Play the King (2 episodes, 1993) - John Staines
- Nice Day at the Office (1994) - Robert Hutchinson
- Crusades (1995) - Urban II
- Sardines (1995) - Tench
- Backup (1995) - DCI Milne
- Alas Smith and Jones (1 episode, 1997)
- Kavanagh QC (1998) - Brown QC
- Wycliffe (1998) - Rupert
- A Touch of Frost (1999)
- Bugs (1999) - Chichester
- The Alchemists (1999) - Anaesthetist
- Heartbeat (2000) - Rod Dundas
- Dirty Tricks (2000) - Defence Counsel
- Bertie and Elizabeth (2002) - Ernest Simpson
- The Bill (4 episodes, 1999–2002) - Richard Casson / Ken Watts / David Bryce
- Lucky Jim (2003) - Mr. Pringle
- Hollyoaks (2003) - Mr. Cornwell
- Midsomer Murders (2005) - Captain Tucker
- Strictly Confidential (2006) - Stefan
- Half-Broken Things (2007) - Magistrate
- Doctors (2008-2011) - Len Hardwick / David Rothering
- Micro Men (2009) - Norman Hewett
- The Queen (2009) - Robin Janvrin

=== Partial radio ===
- The Archers (1972–1973)
- BBC Drama Repertory Company (1974–1975)
- BBC Radio, A Little Night Exposure (Radio 4 series, 1980–1981)

== Recognition ==
Of Smee's 1992 performance in Thirteenth Night, Sabine Durrant of The Independent wrote "Anthony Smee, one part David Owen to two parts Edward Fox – delivers some masterfully refined paranoia".

Of Smee's 2010 role as Somerset Maugham in 'Mr Maugham at Home' at The New End Theatre, Clive Davis of The Times described his performance as superb.

== Family ==
Smee is the biological father of Olympic dressage gold medallist Carl Hester.
