= Brass (TV series) =

- Genre: Comedy drama
- Directed by: Les Chatfield
- Starring: Timothy West; Caroline Blakiston; Barbara Ewing; David Ashton; James Saxon; Geoffrey Hinsliff; Gary Cady
- Country of origin: United Kingdom
- Original language: English
- No. of series: 3
- No. of episodes: 32

Production
- Running time: 30 minutes
- Production company: Granada Television

Original release
- Network: ITV
- Release: 21 February 1983 – 20 August 1984
- Network: Channel 4
- Release: 23 April – 28 May 1990

Brass is a British television comedy drama, made by Granada Television for ITV and eventually Channel 4. "Brass" is northern English slang for "money" as well as for effrontery. The series was set primarily in Utterley, a fictional Lancashire mining town in the 1930s, Brass satirized working-class period dramas of the 1970s, most significantly When the Boat Comes In, and also the 1977 Granada TV dramatisation of Dickens' Hard Times, which also starred Timothy West. Unusually for ITV comedies of the time, Brass eschewed a laugh track and used a dry sense of humour based in part on convoluted wordplay and subtle commentary on popular culture.

== Story and characters ==
The series, created by John Stevenson and Julian Roach, was about two feuding families—the wealthy Hardacres and the working-class Fairchilds—who lived in a small terraced house rented from the Hardacre empire. The Hardacre family was headed by the ruthless self-made businessman Bradley Hardacre and his glamorous, alcoholic, aristocratic wife Lady Patience. Bradley spouted Thatcherite rhetoric, while coming up with harebrained schemes to make his businesses more efficient so he could sack workers. The head of the Fairchilds was the stern "Red" Agnes, who spread militant socialist rhetoric around the Hardacre mine, mill and munitions factory and her doltish, forelock-tugging husband George who is dominated by his wife and his boss. Agnes was also Bradley Hardacre's mistress.

Other characters in the series were the children of the families. The Fairchilds had two sons—Jack, a defiant miner and Matthew, a sensitive clerk who wrote very poor verse. The Hardacre children were Bentley (deceased; his memorial stone is featured in the first episode), glamorous, nymphomaniac Isobel, innocent budding feminist Charlotte, ambitious heir to the Hardacre empire Austin and Morris, a gay Cambridge student with a fondness for teddy bears (cf. Sebastian in Brideshead Revisited). Bentley, Austin and Morris are named after British car manufacturers; Jack and Matt were named after terms used in the game of bowls.

Not only were Bradley and Agnes lovers, with Bradley being most likely the father of Matthew but Isobel and Jack were also lovers and afterwards it was revealed that Charlotte was not Bradley's daughter but the result of an affair between Lady Patience and the elderly Lord Mountfast, whom Isobel married. Charlotte married Matthew, to whom Morris Hardacre had at one time been attracted. To complicate matters Lady Patience also had a brief fling with Matthew Fairchild.

Despite his wealth and social connections, Bradley had been brought up in the Utterley Cottage workhouse and had made his money himself, obviously not legally or fairly. Apart from the Hardacres and the Fairchilds the most significant other character was the Scottish idealist, Dr McDuff, played by David Ashton and satirising Dr. Finlay of Dr. Finlay's Casebook.

== Cast ==
- Timothy West as Bradley Hardacre
- Caroline Blakiston as Lady Patience Hardacre
- Barbara Ewing as "Red" Agnes Fairchild
- Gary Cady as Matthew Fairchild
- James Saxon as Morris Hardacre
- Gail Harrison as Isobel Hardacre, later Lady Mountfast
- Emily Morgan as Charlotte Hardacre
- Shaun Scott as Jack Fairchild
- David Ashton as Doctor McDuff
- Anthony Smee as Guy Baggers
- Robert Reynolds (series 1 and 2) and Patrick Pearson (series 3) as Austin Hardacre
- Geoffrey Hinsliff (series 1 and 2) and Geoffrey Hutchings (series 3) as George Fairchild
- Bill Monks as Job Lott (series 1 and 2)
- John de Frates as Arthur Talbot (series 2)
- John Nettleton as Lord Mountfast (series 2)
- Philip Bird as Henry Lecoq (series 3)

== Series history ==
Brass ran for two series on ITV, shown between 1982 and 1984, and was brought back for a third series in 1990 on Channel 4, set in 1939. The third series saw the Hardacres move to London and later to a country mansion called Yonderley but making frequent trips to Utterley or Swarfside, where the Hardacre business empire was still based. The Fairchilds had also moved to London as Agnes was now MP for Utterley.

== Filming ==
Some scenes are set at Croydon Airport but were filmed at Barton Airport, whose distinctive control tower appears in the film. Some of the opening scenes are of Thorn Street in Summerseat, Bury, Greater Manchester.

== Availability on video ==
The series is available on DVD in the United Kingdom.
