= David McAlister =

English actor

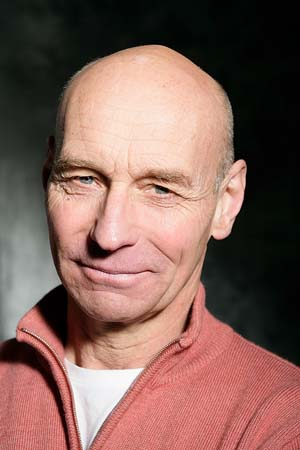
- McAlister in 2013
- Born: David Shaun H. McAlister; 2 April 1951; Worthing, Sussex, England
- Died: 26 June 2015 (aged 64); Kensington and Chelsea, London, England
- Occupation: Actor
- Years active: 1964–2015

David McAlister (2 April 1951 – 26 June 2015) was an English actor on television, in musicals, on stage and in film, known for his voice-over work.

== Personal life ==
McAlister was born on 2 April 1951 in Worthing, Sussex and died on 25 June 2015 of cancer. He was married with two children (a girl and a boy) living with his family in Surrey.

== Career ==
McAlister was best known for his portrayal of Daddy Warbucks in the stage production of the American musical Annie. It was in 2006 that he first got the part of Daddy Warbucks in Annie The Musical. He returned to the part in 2009 for its UK Tour, and then again between 2010–2011, and in 2012 went with it to Hong Kong and Singapore. He died in 2015.

== Theatres and musicals ==
McAlister also starred as Horace Vandergelder in the 2008 stage revival of Hello, Dolly!! For 5 years he played Dennis Richardson in Channel 4’s Hollyoaks (British Soap Nomination as Best Villain). He was active in various areas of the entertainment industry such as Opera at Covent Garden (Pazzariello in Franco Zeffirelli’s production of Pagliacci), TV comedy (Harry Enfield & Chums), Radio Drama (The Archers) and classic TV (Brideshead Revisited).

In musical theatre he was the original Harry in the National tour of Stephen Sondheim’s Company, whilst in London’s West End The Sound of Music (Palace Theatre) as 12-year-old Freidrich Von Trapp, Ernest Simpson in Always (Victoria Palace), A Month in the Country (Cambridge), Oh Kay! (Westminster), and Christian Brent in Peg (Phoenix) He also played Kurt Weill in Ken Russell’s Weill & Lenya and Noël Coward in Sheridan Morley’s Noel & Gertie. He spent a year as the lead in the West End production of The Mousetrap (St Martins), and starred in the Ivor Novello role in Kings Rhapsody (National tour) and created the role of Alan in the European premiere of the Maltby/Shire musical Baby. In 2005 he was flown to Doha to entertain The Emir Of Qatar as Leading Player in Aspire (a circus-style musical entertainment). He created the role of Sinclair Platt in Dreams from a Summerhouse (written and directed by Alan Ayckbourn) in Scarborough.

== Television ==
Has appeared on television for over 50 years in shows such as:

- The Golden Hour
- Red Cap
- Mike Bassett TV
- Doctor Who (in the serial The Stones of Blood)
- Agatha Christie's Poirot
- Top Buzzer
- Miss Marple
- Cor, Blimey!
- Two Thousand Acres of Sky
- Rab C. Nesbitt
- Growing Pains
- The Chief
- Perfect Scoundrels
- Traffik
- Macready & Daughter
- Peak Practice
- Pie in the Sky
- Home James
- Never the Twain
- Farrington of the F.O.
- Wings
- All at No 20
- Secret Army
- Capital City
- Dangerfield
- Lovejoy
- EastEnders
- The Bill
- Emmerdale
- Doctors
- Triangle
- Brookside
- Waterfront Beat
- Crossroads
- Hollyoaks (1997, 2002–2003) – Dennis Richardson
- The Sandbaggers (1978)
- Bugs

== Films ==
- Lighthouse Hill
- Decline and Fall
- Fatherland
- The Last Englishman
- Brookdale
- Doomsday Gun
- A Princess in Love
- The Music Lovers
- Waiting for a Killer
- Walking Shadows
- Princess Daisy
