= Is This Sexual Harassment? =

BBC television programme

Is This Sexual Harassment? is a BBC television programme. It features twenty people watching and discussing a fictional scenario featuring Cat and Ryan.
