= Miss Marple (TV series) =

BBC adaptation of the novels by Agatha Christie starring Joan Hickson

- Original title card
- Starring: Joan Hickson; David Horovitch; Ian Brimble; John Castle; Gwen Watford; Barbara Hicks; Christopher Good
- Country of origin: United Kingdom
- Original language: English
- No. of series: 3
- No. of episodes: 12

Production
- Producer: George Gallaccio
- Running time: 120 minutes

Original release
- Network: BBC One
- Release: 26 December 1984 – 27 December 1992

Related
- Agatha Christie's Marple

Miss Marple, titled Agatha Christie's Miss Marple in the series, is a British television series based on the Miss Marple murder mystery novels by Agatha Christie, starring Joan Hickson in the title role. It aired from 26 December 1984 to 27 December 1992 on BBC One. All twelve original Miss Marple novels by Christie were dramatised.

The adaptations were written by T. R. Bowen, Julia Jones, Alan Plater, Ken Taylor and Jill Hyem; and the series was produced by George Gallaccio. In addition to its availability on VHS and DVD, the series began to be released on Blu-ray Disc in October 2014, marking its 30th anniversary.

== Background ==
Agatha Christie had never been very happy with most filmed adaptations of her works, and according to her grandson Mathew Prichard, who handled her estate after her death, she "did not care much for television", either. Producer Pat Sandys of London Weekend Television first approached Prichard and the Christie estate with a researched, detailed plan to film the novels Why Didn't They Ask Evans? and The Seven Dials Mystery in the early 1980s. Although indifferently treated by critics, the projects were popular with audiences and led to the filming of a number of short stories and the Tommy and Tuppence Beresford stories including The Secret Adversary and in the subsequent series Agatha Christie's Partners in Crime. With the success of that series, the BBC received approval to produce the stories of one of Christie's most famous detectives.

Joan Hickson as Miss Marple

When the BBC was granted the screen rights to all twelve Miss Marple novels, the rights to three already co-existed and were set to expire at the end of 1988. The Mirror Crack'd From Side to Side had already been filmed and theatrically released in 1980 with Angela Lansbury in the role, and the same production company was in the process of filming A Caribbean Mystery and They Do It With Mirrors with Helen Hayes for television broadcast. Thus these three titles were the last to be dramatised under the BBC's agreement.

The adaptations are mainly true to the original novels. Joan Hickson, who played Miss Marple, was an octogenarian herself during most of the series' production. In 1980 she had appeared in a minor role of Mrs Rivington in Why Didn't They Ask Evans? Decades before, she had appeared in a minor role in Murder, She Said, in which Margaret Rutherford played Miss Marple and interestingly referred to Hickson's character as the younger generation. Hickson had also appeared in a stage adaptation of the novel Appointment with Death in 1946, after which Christie sent Hickson a note that read, "I hope one day you will play my dear Miss Marple."

== Characters ==
=== Regular characters ===
In addition to Miss Marple, there are two semi-regular characters in the series. The first is Inspector (later Superintendent) Slack, played by David Horovitch; the second is Constable (later Sergeant) Lake, played by Ian Brimble. Slack and Lake appear in five episodes: "The Body in the Library", "The Murder at the Vicarage", "4:50 from Paddington", "They Do It with Mirrors" and "The Mirror Crack'd from Side to Side". They are the official detectives, and both (particularly Slack) originally dislike and are exasperated by Miss Marple, her interference and her methods, but they eventually come to respect and (indeed, in the case of Lake) like her.

- Inspector/Superintendent Slack (David Horovitch) – Slack is the senior officer in charge of many cases. He has been described as "a man who has never striven more to contradict his name". Miss Marple describes him as having the "same personality as that of a diesel engine, most unappealing, but efficient". When Slack first met Miss Marple, her strange personality and her quirky methods caused him to think she was "batty", and thus he took no notice of her. Slack especially disliked the fact that his superiors think highly of Miss Marple and consult her for advice (although he later ends up doing the same). Usually, Slack passes over Miss Marple's beliefs and dislikes her interfering, although he later comes to value her advice. In his final appearance, it is revealed that Slack has been promoted to Superintendent and appears to have grown wiser, even telling an officer to consult Miss Marple. In "They Do It with Mirrors" it is revealed that Slack has a passion for magic tricks, and secretly practises. Slack is featured in the novels The Murder at the Vicarage and The Body in the Library.
- Constable/Sergeant Lake (Ian Brimble) – Lake is Slack's colleague and often works with him. He is also very bemused by Miss Marple, her quirky ways, her unusual methods, and her claims of solving the cases based on trivial stories from her past. However, the difference was whilst Slack was annoyed by Miss Marple, Lake found her quite funny. By the time of They Do It With Mirrors, Lake is on friendly terms with Miss Marple. When Slack is promoted, Lake gets more roles in the art of criminal investigation but stays a Sergeant. Lake is featured in the novel They Do It with Mirrors.

=== Recurring characters ===
- John Castle appears as Inspector Dermot Eric Craddock in "A Murder Is Announced" and "The Mirror Crack'd from Side to Side". Craddock was unknown to Miss Marple in the former story but in the latter had become her nephew.
- Gwen Watford appears as Mrs Dolly Bantry in "The Body in the Library" and "The Mirror Crack'd from Side to Side".
- Barbara Hicks appears as Miss Hartnell in "The Murder at the Vicarage" and "The Mirror Crack'd from Side to Side".
- Christopher Good appears as Christopher Hawes, the curate in "The Murder at the Vicarage", and the vicar in "The Mirror Crack'd from Side to Side".
- Rhoda Lewis is village shopkeeper and postmistress Mrs Brogan in "A Pocket Full of Rye", "4:50 from Paddington" and "The Mirror Crack'd from Side to Side".
- Miss Marple's nephew Raymond West appears in "Sleeping Murder" (played by David McAlister) and in "A Caribbean Mystery" and "The Mirror Crack'd from Side to Side" (played by Trevor Bowen).
- Jason Rafiel appears in "Nemesis", played by Frank Gatliff, and "A Caribbean Mystery", played by Donald Pleasence (although the two episodes are set in the reverse order to which they aired).

== Episodes ==
No.	Title	Directed by	Dramatised by	Original release date	Guest cast and synopsis	IMDb link
1	"The Body in the Library"	Silvio Narizzano	T.R. Bowen	26, 27, 28 December 1984	Gwen Watford, Moray Watson, Trudie Styler, Jess Conrad, Ciaran Madden, Keith Drinkel, Debbie Arnold, Frederick Jaeger, Valentine Dyall, Raymond Francis, David Horovitch, Anthony Smee, Andrew Cruickshank, Hugh Walters, Arthur Bostrom, Stephen Churchett, John Moffatt	
1	"The Body in the Library"	Silvio Narizzano	T.R. Bowen	26, 27, 28 December 1984	Miss Marple assists her neighbours, the Bantrys, when a lovely young girl is found dead in their library. The girl is traced to a seaside resort and the desperate family of a wealthy old man.	
2	"The Moving Finger"	Roy Boulting	Julia Jones	21, 22 February 1985	Michael Culver, Elizabeth Counsell, Richard Pearson, Sabina Franklyn, Andrew Bicknell, Deborah Appleby, Hilary Mason, Dilys Hamlett, John Arnatt, Sandra Payne, Martin Fisk, Geoffrey Davion, Victor Maddern, Gordon Rollings, Patsy Smart, Gerald Sim	
2	"The Moving Finger"	Roy Boulting	Julia Jones	21, 22 February 1985	Poison pen letters are being sent to many people in the village. It seems like a vulgar joke until one is found next to a suicide victim. The vicar's wife is a friend of Miss Marple and asks her to come and discover the culprit. Then another body is found, this time clearly the victim of murder.	
3	"A Murder Is Announced"	David Giles	Alan Plater	28 February, 1, 2 March 1985	Ursula Howells, Renée Asherson, Joan Sims, John Castle, Sylvia Syms, Ralph Michael, Paola Dionisotti, Samantha Bond, Simon Shepherd, Mary Kerridge, David Collings, Elaine Ives-Cameron, Joyce Carey, Kevin Whately, Liz Crowther	
3	"A Murder Is Announced"	David Giles	Alan Plater	28 February, 1, 2 March 1985	A party game goes wrong and a young Swiss man is dead. Friends and neighbours start to turn on each other, and Inspector Craddock is stumped. Fortunately, Miss Marple is visiting her niece and helps solve the crime.	
4	"A Pocket Full of Rye"	Guy Slater	T.R. Bowen	7, 8 March 1985	Peter Davison, Timothy West, Stacy Dorning, Annette Badland, Fabia Drake, Clive Merrison, Rachel Bell, Selina Cadell, Tom Wilkinson, Susan Gilmore, Frank Mills, Louis Mahoney, Jon Glover	
4	"A Pocket Full of Rye"	Guy Slater	T.R. Bowen	7, 8 March 1985	Members of a wealthy business family start to be murdered one by one, along with one of their maids. Features of the killings remind Miss Marple of the old nursery rhyme Sing a Song of Sixpence, and she vows to find the villain behind the crimes.	
5	"The Murder at the Vicarage"	Julian Amyes	T.R. Bowen	25 December 1986	Paul Eddington, Cheryl Campbell, Robert Lang, Polly Adams, James Hazeldine, Jack Galloway, Rosalie Crutchley, Norma West, Christopher Good	
5	"The Murder at the Vicarage"	Julian Amyes	T.R. Bowen	25 December 1986	Death is only steps from Miss Marple when Colonel Lucius Protheroe is murdered in the idyllic village of St. Mary Mead—in the vicar's study, no less.	
6	"Sleeping Murder"	John Davies	Ken Taylor	11, 18 January 1987	Geraldine Alexander, John Moulder-Brown, Jean Anderson, Terrence Hardiman, Frederick Treves, John Bennett, Geraldine Newman, Jack Watson, Jean Heywood, Amanda Boxer, Esmond Knight, John Ringham, David McAlister, Kenneth Cope, Gary Watson, Donald Burton, Sheila Raynor	
6	"Sleeping Murder"	John Davies	Ken Taylor	11, 18 January 1987	A young wife, Gwenda, starts to see images from the past in the Devon home she and her husband buy. With Miss Marple's guidance, she realises that she witnessed the murder of her stepmother there 20 years ago, as a child. Despite Miss Marple's advice to let sleeping murder lie, the newlyweds decide to investigate the crime, putting Gwenda's own life at risk by stirring a murderer into renewed action.	
7	"At Bertram's Hotel"	Mary McMurray	Jill Hyem	25 January, 1 February 1987	Caroline Blakiston, Joan Greenwood, George Baker, James Cossins, Helena Michell, Irene Sutcliffe, Preston Lockwood, Edward Burnham, Donald Burton, Peter Baldwin, Richard Gibson	
7	"At Bertram's Hotel"	Mary McMurray	Jill Hyem	25 January, 1 February 1987	False identities, larceny and a crime ring are only the tip of the iceberg when Miss Marple stays at a very civilised London hotel (sometimes said to be modelled on Brown's Hotel), where nothing is what it seems. Miss Marple finds herself assisting the police. Murder naturally follows, leading to a thrilling chase and a tragedy before the facts are revealed.	
8	"Nemesis"	David Tucker	T.R. Bowen	8, 15 February 1987	Margaret Tyzack, John Horsley, Anna Cropper, Valerie Lush, Helen Cherry, Peter Tilbury, Liz Fraser, Bruce Payne, Joanna Hole, Jane Booker, Frank Gatliff, Peter Copley, Roger Hammond, Patrick Godfrey	
8	"Nemesis"	David Tucker	T.R. Bowen	8, 15 February 1987	Miss Marple is sent by a dead millionaire on a coach tour to secure justice, although for whom is unclear. Vowing to find out the truth, and accompanied by her nephew, she links the millionaire to a dead girl, Verity Hunt, and a family of sisters who live in a decrepit manor house. Another death takes place before Miss Marple discovers that love, as well as hate, can be a reason for murder.	
9	"4:50 from Paddington"	Martyn Friend	T.R. Bowen	25 December 1987	Maurice Denham, Joanna David, Jill Meager, Andrew Burt, Jean Boht, John Hallam, David Waller	
9	"4:50 from Paddington"	Martyn Friend	T.R. Bowen	25 December 1987	Miss Marple's friend witnesses a murder in a railway carriage running parallel to her own, so Miss Marple engages a resourceful young woman to investigate. The search leads to a decrepit estate, where they suspect the body was dumped. But the seemingly innocent family who live there have secrets of their own.	
10	"A Caribbean Mystery"	Christopher Petit	T.R. Bowen	25 December 1989	Donald Pleasence, Sophie Ward, Adrian Lukis, T. P. McKenna, Frank Middlemass, Sue Lloyd, Michael Feast, Sheila Ruskin, Joseph Mydell	
10	"A Caribbean Mystery"	Christopher Petit	T.R. Bowen	25 December 1989	While holidaying in Barbados, Miss Marple is told by an elderly major that he knows a murderer. The major is found dead, apparently of natural causes, but suspicion grows about the cause. A member of staff at the resort is murdered, and with a new ally, Miss Marple is on the trail of a manipulative and ruthless killer.	
11	"They Do It with Mirrors"	Norman Stone	T.R. Bowen	29 December 1991	Jean Simmons, Joss Ackland, Faith Brook, Holly Aird, Christopher Villiers, Brenda Cowling	
11	"They Do It with Mirrors"	Norman Stone	T.R. Bowen	29 December 1991	At an estate which has become a private reform institution for young criminals, Miss Marple visits her old school friend Carrie Louise. When Carrie Louise's stepson is killed, the police are faced with many suspects. A second killing takes place before Miss Marple helps to identify the murderer.	
12	"The Mirror Crack'd from Side to Side"	Norman Stone	T.R. Bowen	27 December 1992	Claire Bloom, Barry Newman, Gwen Watford, John Castle, Elizabeth Garvie, Judy Cornwell, Glynis Barber, Christopher Hancock, Rose Keegan, Amanda Elwes, Christopher Good, Margaret Courtenay	
12	"The Mirror Crack'd from Side to Side"	Norman Stone	T.R. Bowen	27 December 1992	Hollywood comes to St. Mary Mead when faded movie star Marina Gregg buys Gossington Hall (the home of the Bantrys in The Body in the Library) and stars in a film being shot at a nearby studio. But when she narrowly escapes an attempt on her life and a local woman dies instead, followed by a later death, Miss Marple has to sift through the facts about Gregg's past to uncover a tragedy.	

== Production ==
BBC producer Guy Slater cast Joan Hickson as Miss Marple. The series was filmed beginning in 1983 in areas including Norfolk, Devon, Oxfordshire and Barbados. The town of Nether Wallop in Hampshire doubled as Miss Marple's home village of St. Mary Mead. Slater was replaced by producer George Gallaccio, starting with the fourth film. The closing credits refer to the films being "A BBC-tv production in association with the Arts and Entertainment Network, USA and the Seven Network, Australia".

The first series consisted of four books adapted into ten episodes, each approximately 55–60 minutes in length and were broadcast between December 1984 and March 1985. The second series featured another four books, adapted as eight episodes, but the first two were combined into a 110-minute feature length episode shown on Christmas Day 1986, followed by the remaining six episodes at 55–60 minutes in length each in January and February 1987. The remaining four stories were broadcast as stand alone, 120-minute feature length episodes in the Christmas periods of 1987, 1989, 1991 and 1992. Eventually, with multiple repeats, all twelve stories were broadcast as both stand alone, feature length stories and broken into 50-55 minute single episodes.

Hickson vowed not to do another film after 1989's "A Caribbean Mystery" but was persuaded to return for the final two films in 1991 and 1992. "A Caribbean Mystery" was shot on location at the Coral Reef Hotel in Barbados, where Christie had stayed in her visit to the country, and which had been the inspiration for the setting of the novel. Owners Budge and Cynthia O'Hara, who still owned the hotel thirty years later, were the inspirations for the characters in the novel and were able to share a treasure trove of Christie memorabilia with the cast.

The evocative theme tune for the TV series was composed by Ken Howard and Alan Blaikley. The series opening titles featured paintings by renowned illustrator Paul Birkbeck of seemingly pleasant village life, darkened by suspicious looking characters and the shot of a murder victim behind a cricket sight screen. Gossipy women were made to look like they were hiding secrets, whilst the vicar appeared to be hiding in the shadows. Finally, a wealthy aristocrat sheds a bitter tear as she gazes through her Manor House window. For the first four adaptations, these paintings were black and white, but from "The Murder at the Vicarage" onwards, new colour drawings replaced them. In addition, these replacement colour drawings showed the characters with early 1950s fashions and hairstyles, in contrast to the black and white characters who were painted in late 1940s fashions, referencing the passing of time in the stories. The colour drawing of the lady in her Manor House also includes a degree of animation, as the curtains she looks through gently billow in the wind. The series closing credits featured a contemplative portrait of Hickson as Miss Marple in her trademark straw hat. This too was also revised after the first four adaptations. The later image showed Miss Marple without her glasses.

Adaptations of the books A Caribbean Mystery (1964) and Nemesis (1971) were filmed out of order. "Nemesis" was produced in February 1987 and "A Caribbean Mystery" in December 1989. The significance of this is the character Jason Rafiel, who is introduced in A Caribbean Mystery and in Nemesis has died and made a request of Miss Marple to solve a years-old mystery. Because the two episodes were filmed out of order, viewers of "Nemesis" are clueless as to what part Jason Rafiel played in Miss Marple's life until they watch "A Caribbean Mystery". Rafiel was portrayed by Frank Gatliff in "Nemesis", and by Donald Pleasence in "A Caribbean Mystery".

The character of Inspector Craddock presents another inconsistency in the series. The character is clearly unknown to Miss Marple in "A Murder is Announced" but in his second appearance in "The Mirror Crack'd from Side to Side", Craddock is Miss Marple's nephew.

All of the episodes take place in the 1950s (although some of the original novels date back to the 1930s). "The Murder at the Vicarage" is set in 1954, according to a sign about money being raised for the church fund. This takes place after the events of "The Body in the Library", which Miss Marple relates briefly when describing how she first came across Inspector Slack. "Nemesis" is set in August 1955 according to the date on a letter sent to Miss Marple. "A Caribbean Mystery" is set prior to this, in either 1951 (from the date on a library book) or 1952 (photographs of Queen Elizabeth II in the office of the Barbados administrator). "At Bertram's Hotel" is set relatively shortly after the launch of ITV (in September 1955), so probably in 1956 (though it also shows the London Hilton completed, which suggests the early 1960s), and "4:50 from Paddington" is set in 1957, during the launch of Sputnik.

== Reception ==
The first episode was enthusiastically received by critics. The Times said "once hooked, you won't be able to turn off”. For episode two, "The Moving Finger", The Daily Telegraph stated "Once again Guy Slater's production is built around the brilliant performance of Joan Hickson, behind whose faded blue eyes and spinsterish sibilants, the wheels of detective intelligence can be seen positively whirring around. The enterprise is impeccably cast, beautifully ordered, lovingly photographed." Reviews for subsequent films were equally positive.

Alan McKee, of the Museum of Broadcast Communications, reviews the series as "a good example of a 'heritage' production", popular in the 1980s. It combines new Victorianism in moral standards and a sanitised version of England's past. Mostly set in a rural past, English architecture and country mansion houses are featured. Like many BBC programmes, production values are impeccable and costumes, houses and decor, cars, hairstyles and make-up could all be described as "sumptuous".

McKee also praises the series for "being as faithful as possible to the source material. Miss Marple does not chase the villains herself as Margaret Rutherford does in her film series, nor are the titles of the books altered to make them more sensational."

As for Hickson personally, she is frequently described as the "definitive" Miss Marple as Christie would have pictured her, and Hickson personally credited in large part the bestowal of an OBE award to the role, as Queen Elizabeth II was a fan of the series and Hickson's performance.

Hickson was twice nominated for the British Academy Television Award for Best Actress during the series' run. Firstly in 1987 for Murder at the Vicarage and then again in 1988 for Nemesis.

== Other countries ==
All 12 episodes were shown in the United States on the PBS Mystery! series. Miss Marple was also seen in over 30 countries, including Spain, the former Soviet Union, China and Iran.

== Home media ==
Miss Marple was first released in DVD in the UK (Region 2) in 2000. A complete box set of all 12 stories was released in 2005 by 2 Entertain Video. In North America (Region 1), episodes were first released in 2001.

In summer 2009, the Sunday edition of the Greek newspaper Kathimerini was offering to its readers DVDs (one per week) of the series.

In January 2010, the Daily Mail offered six DVDs (from 2 Entertain Video) each with a complete episode from series. The episodes in the DVD giveaway offer were "The Murder at the Vicarage", "Sleeping Murder", "At Bertram's Hotel", "Nemesis", "A Caribbean Mystery", and "They Do It with Mirrors".

To mark the 30th anniversary of the series, BBC Home Entertainment fully remastered the series for release on DVD and, for the first time, on Blu-ray Disc. The series was released in three volumes. Miss Marple: Volume One, released on 28 October 2014, included the episodes "The Body in the Library", "A Murder Is Announced", "The Moving Finger", and "Murder at the Vicarage" and the first part of the three-part documentary special, "A Very British Murder, Part 1: A New Taste for Blood". Miss Marple: Volume Two, released on 31 March 2015, included the episodes "They Do It with Mirrors", "The Mirror Crack'd from Side to Side", "4:50 from Paddington", and "A Pocket Full of Rye" along with the bonus material "A Very British Murder, Part 2: Detection Most Ingenious". Miss Marple: Volume Three, released on 9 June 2015, included the episodes "A Caribbean Mystery", "At Bertram's Hotel", " Sleeping Murder", and "Nemesis" along with the bonus material "A Very British Murder, Part 3: The Golden Age".

In 2025, the series was broadcast on BBC4 and each episode was made available on the BBC iPlayer for 30 days shortly after being broadcast.
