= A Caribbean Mystery =

1964 mystery novel by Agatha Christie

- First edition (UK)
- Author: Agatha Christie
- Language: English
- Series: Miss Marple novels
- Genre: Crime
- Published: 16 November 1964 (Collins Crime Club)
- Publication place: United Kingdom
- Media type: Print
- Pages: 256
- ISBN: 0-451-19992-8
- Preceded by: The Mirror Crack'd from Side to Side
- Followed by: At Bertram's Hotel

A Caribbean Mystery is a mystery novel by the English writer Agatha Christie, first published in the UK by the Collins Crime Club on 16 November, 1964 and in the United States by Dodd, Mead and Company the following year. The UK edition retailed at sixteen shillings (16/-) and the US edition at $4.50. It features the detective Miss Marple.

The novel was generally well-received by reviewers, and has been adapted multiple times for film, television and radio.

According to the literary scholar John Curran, the original working title of the novel was Shadow in Sunlight.

== Plot ==
Miss Marple's nephew has paid for her to holiday at the Golden Palm resort on the Caribbean island of St Honoré, after a bout of ill health. She listens without much interest to the lengthy reminiscences of fellow guest Major Palgrave, but her attention sharpens when he recounts the case of a man who got away with murdering a series of wives. Palgrave produces a photograph of the alleged killer from his wallet and is about to show it to her when he looks over her right shoulder and abruptly changes the subject. Miss Marple notices several people in that direction.

Next day, the maid Victoria finds Major Palgrave dead in his room. Miss Marple asks the local doctor, Dr Graham, to find the photograph Palgrave had mentioned, pretending it is of her nephew, but without success. Then, she interviews the others: Tim and Molly Kendal, the hotel owners; the Prescotts, a clergyman and his sister; Mr Jason Rafiel, an elderly tycoon who uses a wheelchair; Jackson, his valet; Esther Walters, his secretary; the American visitors Lucky Dyson and her husband Greg; and Edward and Evelyn Hillingdon. Señora de Caspearo, another holidaymaker, recalls Major Palgrave's supposed 'evil eye'; Miss Marple points out that in fact that he had a glass eye.

Victoria says that the blood pressure medication, Serenite, found in Major Palgrave's room after his death, had not been there earlier. That night, she is stabbed to death in the hotel grounds. Molly's behaviour has become increasingly erratic, and at one point she had been seen heading outside with a steak knife in her hand. Then, Tim finds Molly unconscious on the floor, apparently from an overdose of sleeping pills. With concerns about the Serenite medication, the police order Major Palgrave's body to be exhumed, and an autopsy reveals that he had been poisoned.

At night, Miss Marple is woken by the sounds of a search party and is told that Tim had woken to find his wife missing. They find what seems to be her body in a creek, but it turns out to be Lucky; the two women resemble one another. Miss Marple has a revelation. She wakes Mr Rafiel and Jackson, calling herself Nemesis, and together they go to the Kendals' house. There they find Tim offering Molly a drink. Miss Marple warns there is a deadly drug in it, and that Tim is the killer.

Miss Marple explains that because of Major Palgrave's glass eye she had been confused about the direction he was looking when he saw the killer. Although apparently gazing over her right shoulder, he had in fact been looking towards her left, to where Tim and Molly were sitting. The story he had told about the serial killer was the story of Tim himself. Afraid of what Palgrave might disclose, Tim had killed him, planting the Serenite to make it look accidental, and had killed Victoria when she raised queries. He had been intending to kill Molly in order to marry Esther, whom he expected to inherit a significant sum from her employer Jason Rafiel, and had been putting belladonna into her cosmetics to make her appear mentally unstable. Tim had asked his wife to meet him by the creek, but she had been distracted by an hallucination due to the belladonna and had wandered off. Tim saw Lucky and mistook her for Molly in the darkness.

Molly takes on the running of the Golden Palm resort herself, with some financial help from Mr Rafiel. Miss Marple takes a flight home to England after her holiday.

== Principal characters ==
- Miss Marple: An elderly spinster detective with an eye for detail and unexpected clues.
- Major Palgrave: An elderly, garrulous man with a glass eye who tells stories from the past. The first victim in the case.
- Tim Kendal: Hotel owner, with his wife Molly.
- Molly Kendal: Hotel owner.
- Jason Rafiel: Wealthy, elderly man; disabled, and uses a wheelchair.
- Esther Walters: Jason Rafiel's secretary.
- Jackson: Mr Rafiel's valet.
- Victoria: A St Honoré native; maid at the hotel. The second victim in the case.
- Greg Dyson: A nature lover, married to Lucky, his second wife.
- Lucky Dyson: An attractive American woman. The third victim in the case.
- Edward Hillingdon: The husband of Evelyn and an avid nature lover.
- Evelyn Hillingdon: Wife of Edward.
- Señora de Caspearo: South American woman on holiday.
- Joan Prescott: An elderly woman on holiday with her brother, Canon Prescott.
- Jeremy Prescott: Miss Prescott's brother, a member of the clergy.
- Dr Graham: The local doctor.

== Literary significance and reception ==
Maurice Richardson in The Observer of 15 November 1964 wrote, "A most encouraging return to somewhere very near her best unputdownable form. ... Suspicion nicely distributed among guests, many of them raffish adulterers. Not very hard to guess, but quite suspenseful. Good varied characterisation including a particularly excellent octogenarian tycoon." Towards the end of the year, Richardson again commented on the book in a special Books of the Year: A Personal Choice column when he said, "Agatha Christie makes one of those gratifying veteran's comebacks."

The Daily Mirror of 21 November 1964 was less enthusiastic": "Not quite at the top of her form. A Miss Marples (sic) story which addicts won't find as unsolvable as usual."

After lukewarm reviews of her two previous novels, Francis Iles (Anthony Berkeley Cox) reported that the writer was back on form in his review in The Guardian's issue of 11 December 1964:

"Mrs Agatha Christie has done it again. In A Caribbean Mystery she tells the reader explicitly what is going to happen; and yet when it does, nine out of ten will be taken completely by surprise – as I was. How does she do it? For the rest, it is Miss Marple this time who is in charge of the story; and all one can guess is that the setting is a Caribbean island."

In a 1990 appreciation of the author, biographer Robert Barnard said the novel had been written:

"in the tradition of all those package-tour mysteries written by indigent crime writers who have to capitalize on their meagre holidays. Nothing much of interest, but useful for illustrating the 'fluffification' of Miss Marple. Reuses a ploy from Appointment with Death."

== Dedication ==
The novel is dedicated to John Cruikshank Rose, "with happy memories of my visit to the West Indies". Christie and her husband Max Mallowan had become friends with John Rose in 1928 at an archaeological site at Ur. He was an architectural draftsman, and in 1932 was hired by Mallowan when he was in charge of the dig in Greater Syria at Tell Arpachiyah, Iraq. Rose was Scottish and, as Christie described him, was "a beautiful draughtsman, with a quiet way of talking, and a gentle humour that I found irresistible."

== Publication history ==
The novel was serialised in the Star Weekly Novel, a Toronto newspaper supplement, in two abridged instalments from 16 to 23 January 1965, with each issue containing an uncredited cover illustration.

== Adaptations ==
=== Television ===
A US TV movie adaptation starring Helen Hayes as Miss Marple and Barnard Hughes as Mr Rafiel premiered in 1983. Mystery novelist Sue Grafton, along with husband Steven Humphrey, adapted the story for television.

A BBC TV adaptation starring Joan Hickson aired in 1989 as part of the series Agatha Christie's Miss Marple, with Donald Pleasence co-starring as Mr Rafiel.

In 2013, the book was adapted for the sixth series of ITV's Agatha Christie's Marple, starring Julia McKenzie as Miss Marple, and Antony Sher as Jason Rafiel.

The novel was adapted into a 2016 episode of the French television series Les Petits Meurtres d'Agatha Christie.

=== Radio ===
Michael Bakewell wrote a five episode BBC Radio adaptation first broadcast in October 1997, featuring June Whitfield as Miss Marple.
