= Joan Hickson =

English actress (1906–1998)

Joan Hickson OBE
- Hickson as Miss Marple
- Born: Joan Bogle Hickson; 5 August 1906; Kingsthorpe, Northamptonshire, England
- Died: 17 October 1998 (aged 92); Colchester, Essex, England
- Occupation: Actress
- Years active: 1927–1993
- Spouse: Eric Butler (m. 1932; died 1967)
- Children: 2
- Awards: Tony Award for Best Performance by a Featured Actress in a Play; 1979 Bedroom Farce

Joan Bogle Butler (5 August 1906 – 17 October 1998), known professionally as Joan Hickson, was an English actress of theatre, film and television. She was known for her role as Agatha Christie's Miss Marple in the television series Miss Marple. She also narrated a number of Miss Marple stories on audiobooks.

== Biography ==
Born in Kingsthorpe, Northampton, Hickson was a daughter of Edith Mary (née Bogle) and Alfred Harold Hickson, a shoe manufacturer. After boarding at Oldfield School in Swanage, Dorset, she went on to train at the Royal Academy of Dramatic Art in London. She made her stage debut in 1927, then worked for several years throughout the United Kingdom, achieving success playing comedic, often eccentric characters in the West End of London. She played the role of the cockney maid Ida in the original production of See How They Run at the Q Theatre in 1944, and then at the Comedy Theatre in January 1945.

Hickson made her first film appearance in 1934. The numerous supporting roles she played during her career included several in Carry On films, notably Sister in Carry On Nurse and Mrs May in Carry On Constable.

In the 1940s Hickson appeared on stage in Appointment with Death, a play by Agatha Christie, who wrote in a note to her, "I will call you to play my 'Miss Marple' one day, if I can find the time to write another play".

In 1961, Hickson played the housekeeper in the film Murder, She Said, based on Agatha Christie's novel 4:50 from Paddington and starring Margaret Rutherford as Miss Marple. From 1963 to 1966 Hickson played Mrs Peace, housekeeper to the Reverend Stephen Young, played by Donald Sinden, in the highly rated TV series Our Man at St Mark's. From 1970 to 1971 she played Mrs Pugsley in Bachelor Father. She also played Mrs Chambers in Whatever Happened to the Likely Lads? In 1986 she played the part of Mrs Trellis in the film Clockwise. Also in 1986 she appeared in episode 2 of the drama series ScreenPlay.

Hickson's stage career included roles in Noël Coward's Blithe Spirit, the musical The Card (1975), adapted by Tony Hatch and Jackie Trent from the novel by Arnold Bennett; and Alan Ayckbourn's Bedroom Farce, for which she won a 1979 Tony Award for Best Featured Actress in a Play and had been nominated for the Laurence Olivier Award for Best Comedy Performance in 1977. In 1980 she appeared as Mrs Rivington in Why Didn't They Ask Evans?, yet another production based on a novel by Agatha Christie.

The BBC began filming the works of Agatha Christie in the mid-1980s and set out to remain faithful to the plotlines and locales of Christie's stories, as well as to represent Miss Marple as written. Hickson played the role of Miss Marple in all 12 adaptations, which were produced from 1984 to 1992; she received two BAFTA nominations for Best TV Actress, in 1987 and 1988. When the OBE was bestowed on Hickson in June 1987 Queen Elizabeth II was reported to have said, "You play the part just as one envisages it." When Hickson retired from the role, believing that she should stop while the programme was still at the peak of its popularity, she stated that she had no intention of retiring from acting altogether.

== Personal life ==
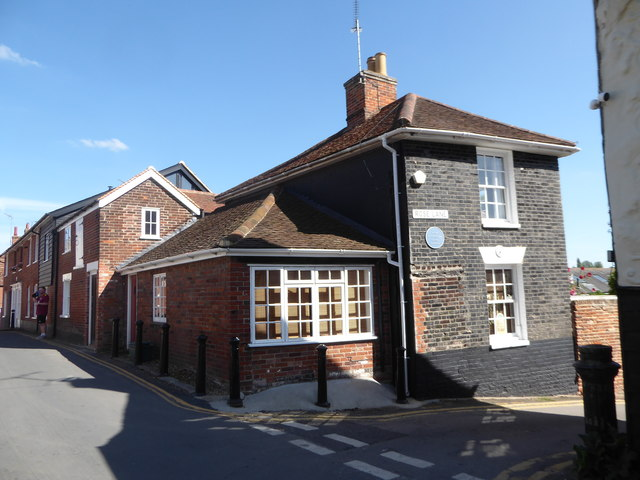
Number 2, Rose Lane, Wivenhoe

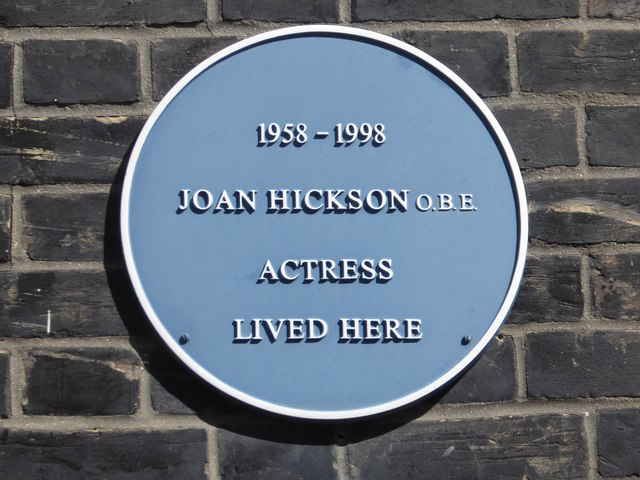
Plaque marking the forty years she lived at 2 Rose Lane

From 1958, Hickson lived at 2 Rose Lane, Wivenhoe, along the River Colne 43 miles (69 kilometres) from London in Essex, for 40 years until her death in 1998. A plaque now marks the house in which she lived.

Hickson married Dr Eric Norman Butler (born 2 September 1902 in Westbury, Wiltshire), a physician, at Hampstead Parish Church, Hampstead, north-west London, on 29 October 1932. They had two children. Her husband died in Colchester, Essex, in June 1967.

== Death ==
Hickson died of a stroke at Colchester General Hospital in 1998, aged 92. She was interred at Sidbury Cemetery in Devon.

== The Miss Marple series (BBC) ==
Series 1

- The Body in the Library (1984)
- The Moving Finger (1985)
- A Murder Is Announced (1985)
- A Pocket Full of Rye (1985)

Series 2

- The Murder at the Vicarage (1986) – BAFTA nomination
- Sleeping Murder (1987)
- At Bertram's Hotel (1987)
- Nemesis (1987) – BAFTA nomination

Stand-alone feature length episodes

- 4:50 from Paddington (1987)
- A Caribbean Mystery (1989)
- They Do It With Mirrors (1991)
- The Mirror Crack'd from Side to Side (1992)

== Partial filmography ==
Year	Title	Role	Notes
1934	Trouble in Store	Mabel	Short
1935	Widow's Might	Burroughs	
1936	The Man Who Could Work Miracles	Effie	
1937	Love from a Stranger	Emmy	
1937	The Lilac Domino	Katrina, school dustmaid	
1938	Second Thoughts	Ellen	
1940	Sailors Don't Care	Woman Carried Ashore	Uncredited
1941	Freedom Radio	Katie	
1943	The Saint Meets the Tiger	Mary (Aunt Agatha's Maid)	Uncredited
1944	Don't Take It to Heart	Mrs Pike	
1945	The Rake's Progress	Miss Parker	
1946	The Trojan Brothers	Ada	
1946	I See a Dark Stranger	Manx Hotel Manageress	
1947	So Well Remembered	Mother	Uncredited
1948	This Was a Woman	Miss Johnson	
1948	Just William's Luck	Hubert's Mother	
1948	Bond Street	Blanche – Seamstress	Uncredited
1948	The Guinea Pig	Mrs Read	
1948	It's Hard to Be Good	Mending Woman	Uncredited
1949	Marry Me!	Mrs Pearson	
1949	Don't Ever Leave Me	Mrs Pearson	Uncredited
1949	Celia	Mrs Haldane	
1950	Seven Days to Noon	Mrs Peckett	
1950	The Magnet	Mrs Ward	
1951	Hell Is Sold Out	Hortense, the housekeeper	
1951	High Treason	Mrs Ellis	
1951	The Magic Box	Mrs Stukely	
1952	Blind Man's Bluff	Mrs Kipps	
1952	The Card	Mrs Codleyn	
1952	The Tall Headlines	Waitress	
1952	Curtain Up	Harry's Landlady	
1952	No Haunt for a Gentleman	Mme Omskaya	
1952	Hindle Wakes	Mrs Hawthorn	
1953	Deadly Nightshade	Mrs Fenton	
1953	Shoot First	Woman Station Announcer	
1953	Sailor of the King	Hotel Manager	Uncredited
1953	Love in Pawn	Woman in Telephone Box	Uncredited
1954	The Million Pound Note	Maggie	Uncredited
1954	Doctor in the House	Mrs Groaker	
1954	The House Across the Lake	Mrs Hardcastle	
1954	What Every Woman Wants	Polly Ann	
1954	Dance, Little Lady	Mrs Matthews	
1954	The Crowded Day	Mrs Jones	
1954	To Dorothy a Son	Pub Landlady	Uncredited
1954	Mad About Men	Mrs Forster	
1955	As Long as They're Happy	Barmaid	
1955	Doctor at Sea	Mrs Thomas	
1955	Value for Money	Mrs Perkins	
1955	The Woman for Joe	Publican's Wife	Uncredited
1955	A Time to Kill	Miss Edinger	
1955	Simon and Laura	Barmaid	
1955	An Alligator Named Daisy	Piano Customer	Uncredited
1956	Lost	Pharmacist	Uncredited
1956	Jumping for Joy	Lady Emily Cranfield	
1956	The Man Who Never Was	Landlady	
1956	Port of Escape	Rosalie Watchett	
1956	The Extra Day	Mrs West	
1956	The Last Man to Hang	Mrs Prynne	
1956	Child in the House	Cook	
1957	Carry On Admiral	Mother	
1957	No Time for Tears	Sister Duckworth	
1957	Barnacle Bill	Mrs Kent	
1958	Happy Is the Bride	Mrs Bowles	
1958	Law and Disorder	Aunt Florence	
1958	Chain of Events	Barmaid	
1958	Behind the Mask	Lady	Uncredited
1958	The Horse's Mouth	Woman in queue at Tate Gallery	Uncredited
1959	Carry On Nurse	Sister	
1959	The 39 Steps	Miss Dobson	
1959	Upstairs and Downstairs	Rosemary	
1959	Please Turn Over	Saleswoman	
1960	Doctor in Love	Nurse	Uncredited
1960	The 3 Worlds of Gulliver	Patient at Dr Gulliver's Surgery	Uncredited
1960	Carry On Constable	Mrs May	
1960	No Kidding	Cook	
1960	Carry On Regardless	Head Matron	
1961	His and Hers	Phoebe	
1961	Raising the Wind	Mrs Bostwick	
1961	Murder She Said	Mrs Kidder	
1962	Crooks Anonymous	Lady	
1962	In the Doghouse	Miss Gibbs	
1962	I Thank a Fool	Landlady	
1963	Nurse on Wheels	Mrs Wood	
1963	Heavens Above!	Housewife	
1965	The Secret of My Success	Mrs Pringle	
1968	Mrs. Brown, You've Got a Lovely Daughter	Landlady	
1970	Carry On Loving	Mrs Grubb	
1971	Friends	Lady in Bookstore	
1972	A Day in the Death of Joe Egg	Grace	
1973	Theatre of Blood	Mrs Sprout	
1973	Carry On Girls	Mrs Dukes	
1974	Confessions of a Window Cleaner	Mrs Radlett	
1975	One of Our Dinosaurs Is Missing	Mrs Gibbons	
1979	Yanks	Mrs Moody	
1982	Gandhi	Woman in court	Uncredited
1983	The Wicked Lady	Aunt Agatha	
1986	Clockwise	Mrs Trellis	
1990	King of the Wind	Duchess of Marlborough	
1993	Century	Mrs Whitweather	Final film role

== Partial television credits ==
Year	Title	Role	Notes
1946	The Corn is Green	Mrs Watty	TV movie
1947	Busman's Honeymoon	Miss Twitterton	TV movie
1950	Over the Odds	Mabel Phelps	TV movie
1956	David Copperfield	Miss Lavinia Spenlow	3 episodes
1958	The Invisible Man	Madame Dupont	Episode: "The Mink Coat"
1960	Barnaby Rudge	Mrs Varden	10 episodes
1963	BBC Sunday-Night Play	Edith Swinney	Episode: "How to Get Rid of Your Wife"
1963-66	Our Man at St Mark's	Mrs Peace	46 episodes
1964	Thursday Theatre	Mrs Jenkins	Episode: "The Cure for Love"
1969	The Possessed	Madame Drosdov	4 episodes
1969	Sinister Street	Mrs Cleghorne	3 episodes
1969	Oh, Brother!	Mother Joan	Episode: "A Mother in Israel"
1970	Bachelor Father	Mrs Pugsley	8 episodes
1970	From a Bird's Eye View	Hilda Tuttle	Episode: "Family Tree"
1972	ITV Saturday Night Theatre	Mrs Hope-Rising	Episode: "Just in Time for Christmas"
1973	Whatever Happened to the Likely Lads?	Mrs Chambers	Episode: "Count Down"
1974	Whatever Happened to the Likely Lads?	Mrs Chambers	Episode: "Heart to Heart"
1975	Within These Walls	Edna Dewfall	Episode: "A Free Woman"
1976	Happy Ever After	Mrs Henderson	Episode: "Old Folks' Party"
1981	Lady Killers	Carrie Esther Rapley	Episode: "My Perfect Husband"
1981	Great Expectations	Miss Havisham	TV series
1983	The Outsider	Lillian Wrathdale	Episode: "The Homecoming"
1984	Poor Little Rich Girls	Lady Harriet	5 episodes
1985	Time for Murder	Miss Wainwright	Episode: "Mister Clay, Mister Clay"
1989	Boon	Della	Episode: "One Reborn Every Minute"
