= Trevor Bowen =

British actor and writer (1941/1942–2025)

- Born: 1941 or 1942; Rangoon, Burma
- Died: November 2, 2025
- Occupations: Actor, screenwriter
- Years active: 1965–2025

Trevor R. Bowen (1941 or 1942 – 2 November 2025), sometimes credited as T. R. Bowen, was a British actor and screenwriter who appeared frequently in British television dramas from the mid-1960s.

== Early life ==
Trevor R. Bowen was the son of Major General W. O. Bowen and was educated at Dulwich College, Winchester Art School, and Queens' College, Cambridge, where he was president of the Marlowe Society and appeared in student productions. He then toured with the Royal Shakespeare Company and appeared in repertory theatres.

== Career ==
=== Acting ===
Bowen's notable television appearances include A Family at War (1970–1972), Dickens of London (1976), Edward & Mrs. Simpson (1978) as Duff Cooper, First Among Equals (1986), The Man Who Made Husbands Jealous (1997), Judge John Deed (2001–2007), and Thatcher: The Final Days (1991) as Kenneth Baker. He also appeared in the films Darling (1965) as Julie Christie's first husband, and Run Fatboy Run (2007) as the doctor.

=== Writing ===
Bowen was active as a television screenwriter from the 1970s, writing many episodes for television films and series, most notably Sherlock Holmes (1984) and The Inspector Alleyn Mysteries (1990 and 1994), but also including contributions to Bognor (1981–1982), Nanny (1983), the BBC series Agatha Christie's Miss Marple (1984–1992) (including the television movie version of The Body in the Library (1984)), Lovejoy (1991–1993), Hornblower Mutiny (2001), and Helen West (2002). He also wrote several novels.

== Death ==
Bowen died on 2 November 2025.

== Publications ==
- Punctuations, London 1971
- The Emperor's Falcon, London 1980 (ISBN 0-41688330-3)
- The Death of Amy Parris, London 1998 (ISBN 0-14027130-9)
- The Black Camel, London 2002 (ISBN 0-14028512-1)

== Filmography ==
Year	Title	Role	Notes
1965	Darling	Tony Bridges	
1990	I Hired a Contract Killer	Department Head	
1995	The Gambling Man	Mr Arden	
2000	Greenfingers	Royal Horticultural Society President	
2007	Run Fatboy Run	Doctor	(final film role)
