= Rosalind Hicks =

Agatha Christie's daughter (1919–2004)

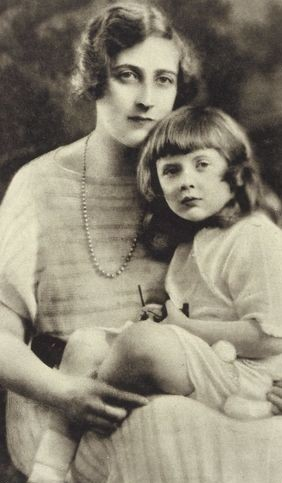
- With her mother Agatha Christie in 1923
- Born: Rosalind Margaret Clarissa Christie; 5 August 1919; Ashfield, Torquay, Devon, England
- Died: 28 October 2004 (aged 85); Greenway Estate, Galmpton, Torbay, Devon, England
- Education: Benenden School
- Spouses: Hubert Prichard (m. 1940; died 1944); Anthony Hicks (m. 1949)
- Children: Mathew Prichard
- Parent(s): Agatha Christie; Archibald Christie
- Relatives: Hubert Prichard (father-in-law); Campbell Christie (uncle); James Watts (cousin)

Rosalind Margaret Clarissa Hicks (formerly Prichard, née Christie; 5 August 1919 – 28 October 2004) was the only child of author Agatha Christie.

== Biography ==
Rosalind Margaret Clarissa Christie was born on 5 August, 1919 in her grandmother's home, Ashfield, Torquay. Her father, Archie Christie, was a military officer previously in the Royal Flying Corps. In 1914, he married aspiring writer Agatha Christie, daughter of Frederick Alvah Miller and Clarissa Miller. At the time of Rosalind's birth, the manuscript of The Mysterious Affair at Styles, Christie's first novel, had been sent out to John Lane and was published a year later.

At age 7, Rosalind and her parents moved to Sunningdale, where they bought a house, naming it Styles. After several months, Rosalind's grandmother, Clarissa Miller, died. Deeply wounded, Agatha moved back into Ashfield (which had been her own childhood home), where she was visited by her husband, who confessed his affair with his secretary Nancy Neele. Following these traumatic events, Agatha disappeared on 3 December 1926 and registered as Neele at a hotel in Yorkshire. There, she was found by the police ten days later and never spoke to Rosalind about the incident. Her parents divorced shortly thereafter and in 1928, Archie Christie married Nancy Neele; their only child together, Archibald, was born in 1930. In the same year, Rosalind's mother remarried to Max Mallowan.

When Rosalind was 11, her mother dedicated the novel, The Murder at the Vicarage, “To Rosalind”. She studied at Benenden School and finished her education in Switzerland and France. As an adult, she spent much of her time at the Greenway Estate in south Devon, which her mother bought in 1938.

Rosalind married Major Hubert de Burr Prichard (14 May 1907 – 16 August 1944), son of Colonel Hubert Prichard, in 1940 at Ruthin, Denbighshire, Wales. Their only child, Mathew Prichard, was born in 1943. A year later, Rosalind's husband died in the Battle of Normandy. She remarried in 1949, to lawyer Anthony Arthur Hicks (26 September 1916 - 15 April 2005) at Kensington, London, England. They lived in the Greenway Estate until Rosalind's death on 28 October 2004, at age 85.

== Mother's estate ==
Following Agatha Christie's death in 1976, Rosalind and Christie's husband inherited most of the £106,683 (equivalent to £718,879 in 2025) she had left behind. Rosalind also received 36% of Agatha Christie Limited and the copyrights to Christie’s play A Daughter’s a Daughter. Believing the main character was based on her, she remained unenthusiastic about this.

Rosalind declined many biographies about her mother, only commissioning Janet Morgan to write an authorised biography in 1984. She became president of the Agatha Christie Society in 1993, naming David Suchet and Joan Hickson, whose performances of Hercule Poirot and Miss Marple she approved of, Vice Presidents of the company. In a 2014 interview with This Morning, Suchet stated:

"I never met Agatha, but the greatest compliment [...], she [Rosalind] actually said that famously her mother hated people playing Poirot. It never came up to expectations, but one morning she came up on the set and said, 'I have to tell you, I think my mother would have been very proud.'"

In 1995, Rosalind reviewed a script for the adaptation of Christie's novel Towards Zero, containing issues such as incest. Appalled, she demanded the changing of the name of the film and its characters. It went on to be released as Innocent Lies.

Rosalind and Anthony donated Greenway Estate to the National Trust in 2000. Following Rosalind's death in 2004, her son Mathew Prichard inherited her shares of Agatha Christie Limited as well as the contents of Greenway, which he gave to the National Trust. Today, Prichard's son James Prichard is CEO and chairman of Agatha Christie Limited.

== Portrayal in fiction ==
The seven-year-old Rosalind appears as a character in the 2018 British television drama, Agatha and the Truth of Murder. She is played by Amelia Rose Dell.
