= The Burden =

1956 novel by Agatha Christie

- Dust-jacket illustration of the first UK edition
- Author: Mary Westmacott (pseudonym of Agatha Christie)
- Cover artist: Kenneth Farnhill
- Language: English
- Publisher: Heinemann
- Publication date: 12 November 1956
- Publication place: United Kingdom
- Media type: Print (hardback & paperback)
- Pages: 236 pp (first edition, hardcover)
- Preceded by: Dead Man's Folly
- Followed by: 4:50 from Paddington

The Burden is a novel written by Agatha Christie and first published in the UK by Heinemann on 12 November 1956. Initially not published in the US, it was later issued as a paperback by Dell Publishing in September 1963. It was the last of six novels Christie wrote under the nom-de-plume Mary Westmacott.

== Explanation of the novel's title ==
The title of the novel is taken from Chapter 11, Verse 30 of the Gospel of Matthew. The full line, as quoted in the Epigraph to the novel, is:

"For my yoke is easy, and my burden is light."

== Plot summary ==
When Laura Franklin's younger sister Shirley comes into the world, Laura instantly resents her, and soon begins to wish and even pray that her baby sister will die. But after saving Shirley's life in a fire, she experiences a complete change of feeling, and becomes very affectionate and protective towards her. Later, as the sisters grow up and fall in love, Laura begins to realise that the burden of her love for Shirley has had a dramatic effect on both their lives.

== Literary significance and reception ==
Siriol Hart's review in the Times Literary Supplement of 7 December 1956, said, "The Burden is by a writer who has been Mary Westmacott for six books and Agatha Christie for more than anyone can count. In spite of the modern smart trimmings, this seems very much the art of story-telling that would be at home in the most staunchly traditional woman's magazine, where all the problems are resolved when the mousey heroine puts on some lipstick (called, in this case "Fatal Apple"), and finds the love of her life."

Vernon Johnson reviewed the novel in the 20 November 1956, issue of The Guardian when he called it a "fantastical novelette" and quoted several lines from the book in a disparaging fashion, stating that they were examples of "the style and the treatment".

== Publication history ==
- 1956, Heinemann (London), 12 November 1956, Hardcover, 236 pp
- 1963, Dell Books (New York), September 1963, Paperback, 223 pp
- 1973, William Collins and Sons, Hardcover, 192 pp
- 1973. Arbor House, (New York), Hardcover, 223 pp
- 1975, Fontana Books (Imprint of HarperCollins), Paperback, 192 pp
- 1979, Ulverscroft Large-print Edition, Hardcover, 321 pp ISBN 0-7089-0331-2
