= Agatha Christie =

English mystery and detective writer (1890–1976)

Dame Agatha Christie DBE
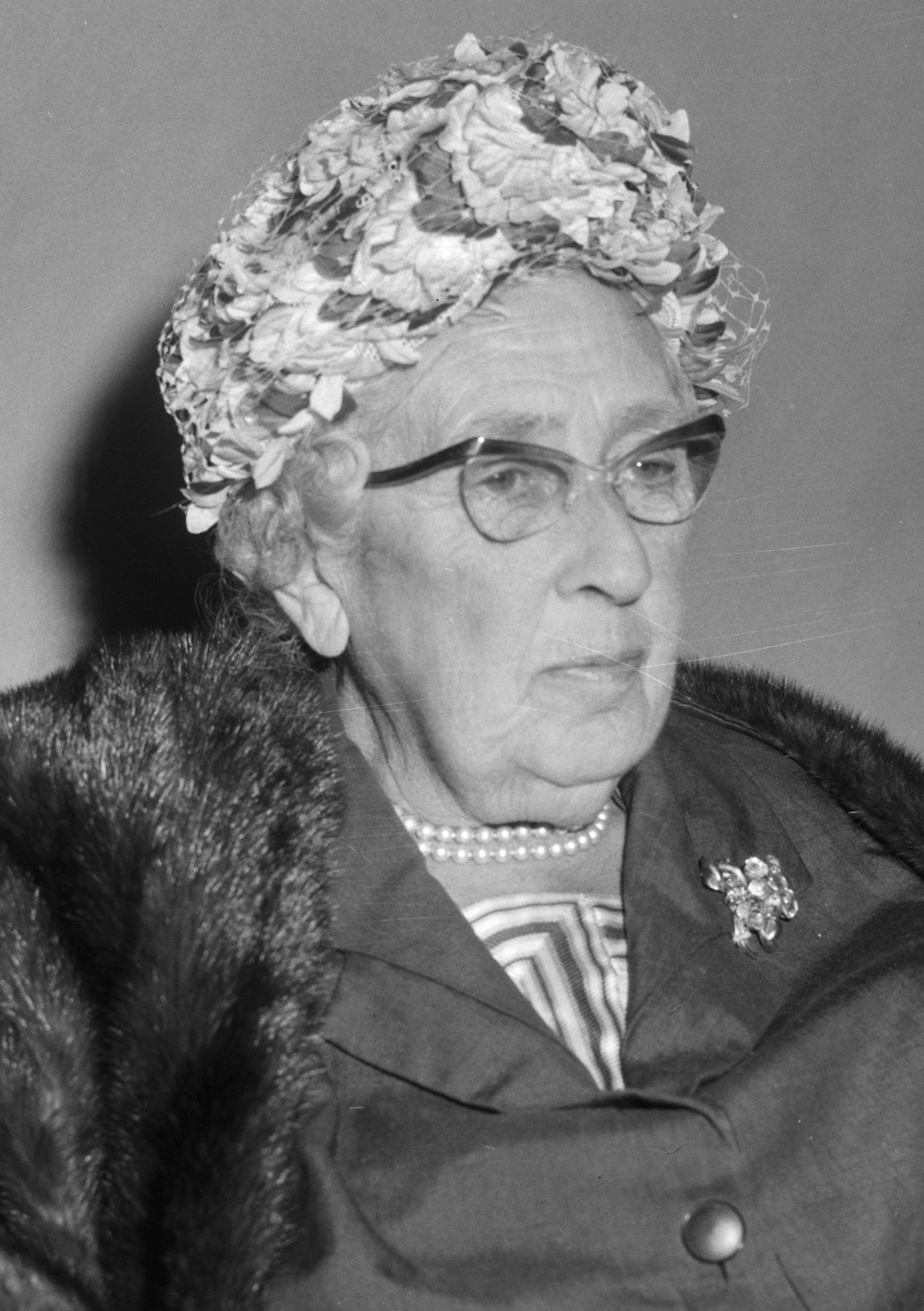
- Christie in 1964
- Born: Agatha Mary Clarissa Miller; 15 September 1890; Ashfield, Torquay, Devon, England
- Died: 12 January 1976 (aged 85); Winterbrook House, Wallingford, Oxfordshire, England
- Resting place: Church of St Mary, Cholsey, Oxfordshire, England
- Occupations: Novelist; short story writer; playwright; poet; memoirist
- Spouses: Archibald Christie (m. 1914; div. 1928) Max Mallowan (m. 1930)
- Children: Rosalind Hicks
- Relatives: James Watts (nephew)
- Writing career
- Pen name: Mary Westmacott
- Genres: Murder mystery; detective story; crime fiction; thriller
- Notable works: The Mysterious Affair at Styles (1920); The Murder of Roger Ackroyd (1926); Partners in Crime (1929); The Murder at the Vicarage (1930); Murder on the Orient Express (1934); The A.B.C. Murders (1936); Death on the Nile (1937); And Then There Were None (1939); The Mousetrap (1952); Witness for the Prosecution (1953); Curtain: Poirot's Last Case (1975)
- Movement: Golden Age of Detective Fiction
- Website: agathachristie.com

Dame Agatha Mary Clarissa Mallowan, Lady Mallowan (née Miller, 15 September 1890 – 12 January 1976), usually known by her first married name, Agatha Christie, was an English author known for her 66 detective novels and 14 short-story collections, particularly those revolving around fictional detectives Hercule Poirot (with the novel debut being The Mysterious Affair at Styles in 1920), Tommy and Tuppence (with the novel debut being The Secret Adversary in 1922), and Miss Marple (with the novel debut being The Murder at the Vicarage in 1930). She is widely regarded as one of the greatest writers of all time, particularly in the mystery genre.

A writer during the "Golden Age of Detective Fiction", Christie has been called the "Queen of Crime"—a nickname now trademarked by her estate—or the "Queen of Mystery". She wrote the world's longest-running play, the murder mystery The Mousetrap, which has been performed in the West End of London since 1952. She also wrote six novels under the pseudonym Mary Westmacott. In 1971, she was made a Dame (DBE) by Queen Elizabeth II for her contributions to literature. She is the best-selling novelist of all time, her books having sold more than two billion copies.

Christie was born into a wealthy upper-middle-class family in Torquay, Devon, and was largely home-schooled. She was initially an unsuccessful writer with six consecutive rejections, but this changed in 1920, when The Mysterious Affair at Styles, featuring detective Hercule Poirot, was published. Her first husband was Archibald Christie; they married in 1914 and had one child before divorcing in 1928. Following the breakdown of her marriage and the death of her mother in 1926, she made international headlines by going missing for 11 days. During both world wars, she served in hospital dispensaries, acquiring a thorough knowledge of the poisons that featured in many of her novels, short stories, and plays. Following her marriage to archaeologist Max Mallowan in 1930, she spent several months each year on archaeological excavations in the Middle East and used her first-hand knowledge of this profession in her fiction.

According to UNESCO's Index Translationum, she remains the most-translated individual author. Her novel And Then There Were None is one of the top-selling books of all time, with about 100 million copies sold. Christie's stage play The Mousetrap holds the world record for the longest initial run. It opened at the Ambassadors Theatre in the West End on 25 November 1952, and by 2018, more than 27,500 performances had been given. The play was temporarily closed in 2020 because of COVID-19 lockdowns in London before it reopened in 2021. In 1955, Christie was the first recipient of the Mystery Writers of America's Grand Master Award. Later that year, Witness for the Prosecution received an Edgar Award for best play. In 2013, she was voted the best crime writer and The Murder of Roger Ackroyd the best crime novel ever by 600 professional novelists of the Crime Writers' Association. In 2015, And Then There Were None was named the "World's Favourite Christie" in a vote sponsored by the author's estate. Many of Christie's books and short stories have been adapted for television, radio, video games, and graphic novels. More than 30 feature films are based on her work.

== Life and career ==
=== 1890–1907: childhood and adolescence ===
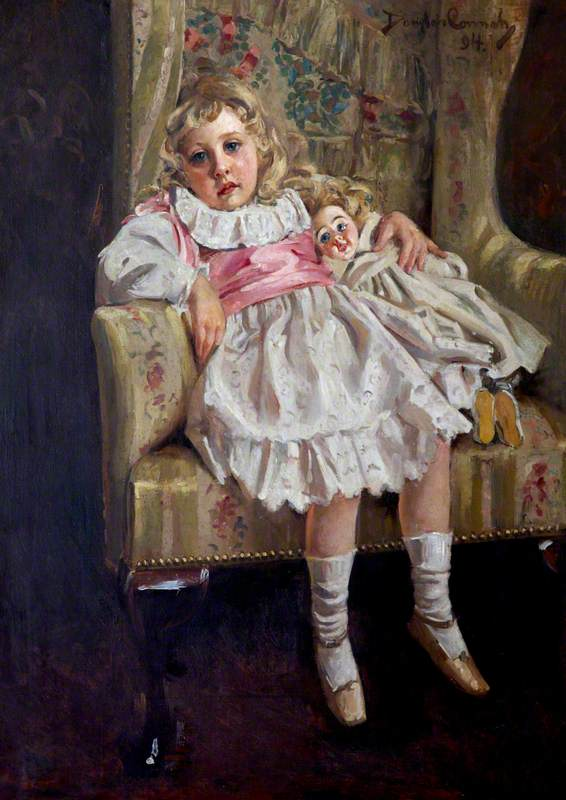
Portrait of Christie entitled Lost in Reverie, by Douglas John Connah, 1894

Agatha Mary Clarissa Miller was born on 15 September 1890, into a wealthy upper middle-class family in Torquay, Devon. She was the youngest of three children born to Frederick Alvah Miller, "a gentleman of substance", and his wife Clarissa "Clara" Margaret (née Boehmer).

Christie's mother Clara was born in Dublin in 1854 (Note: Most biographers give Christie's mother's place of birth as Belfast but do not provide sources. Current primary evidence, including census entries (place of birth Dublin), her baptism record (Dublin), and her father's service record and regimental history (when her father was in Dublin), indicates she was almost certainly born in Dublin in the first quarter of 1854.) to British Army officer Frederick Boehmer and his wife Mary Ann (née West). Boehmer died in Jersey in 1863, (Note: Boehmer's death registration states he died at age 49 from bronchitis after retiring from the army, but Christie and her biographers have consistently claimed he was killed in a riding accident while still a serving officer.) leaving his widow to raise Clara and her brothers on a meagre income. Two weeks after Boehmer's death, Mary's sister, Margaret West, married widowed dry-goods merchant Nathaniel Frary Miller, a US citizen. To assist Mary financially, Margaret and Nathaniel agreed to foster nine-year-old Clara; the family settled in Timperley, Cheshire. The couple had no children together, but Nathaniel had a 17-year-old son, Frederick "Fred", from his previous marriage. Fred was born in New York City and travelled extensively after leaving his Swiss boarding school. Clara and he were married in London in 1878. Their first child, Margaret "Madge" Frary, was born in Torquay in 1879. The second, Louis Montant "Monty", was born in Morristown, New Jersey, in 1880, while the family was on an extended visit to the United States.

When Fred's father died in 1869, he left Clara £2,000 (approximately equivalent to £210,000 in 2025); in 1881, they used this to buy the leasehold of a villa in Torquay named Ashfield. Here, their third and last child, Agatha, was born in 1890. She described her childhood as "very happy". The Millers lived mainly in Devon but often visited her step-grandmother/great-aunt Margaret Miller in Ealing and maternal grandmother Mary Boehmer in Bayswater. A year was spent abroad with her family, in the French Pyrenees, Paris, Dinard, and Guernsey. Because her siblings were so much older, and there were few children in their neighbourhood, Christie spent much of her time playing alone with her pets and imaginary companions. She eventually made friends with other girls in Torquay, noting that "one of the highlights of my existence" was her appearance with them in a youth production of Gilbert and Sullivan's The Yeomen of the Guard, in which she played the hero, Colonel Fairfax.

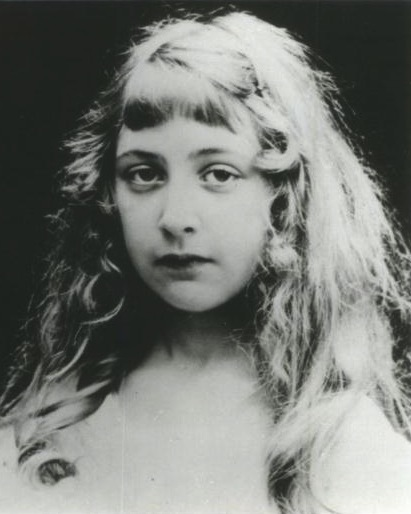
Christie in the early 1900s

According to Christie, Clara believed she should not learn to read until she was eight; thanks to her curiosity, she was reading by the age of four. Her sister had been sent to a boarding school, but their mother insisted that Christie receive her education at home. As a result, her parents and sister supervised her studies in reading, writing, and basic arithmetic, a subject she particularly enjoyed. They also taught her music, and she learned to play the piano and the mandolin.

Christie was a voracious reader from an early age. Some of her earliest memories were of reading children's books by Mary Louisa Molesworth and Edith Nesbit. When a little older, she moved on to the surreal verse of Edward Lear and Lewis Carroll. As an adolescent, she enjoyed works by Anthony Hope, Walter Scott, Charles Dickens, and Alexandre Dumas. In April 1901, aged 10, she wrote her first poem, "The Cow Slip".

By 1901, her father's health had deteriorated, because of what he believed were heart problems. Fred died in November 1901 from pneumonia and chronic kidney disease. Christie later said that her father's death when she was 11 marked the end of her childhood.

The family's financial situation, by this time, had worsened. Madge married the year after their father's death and moved to Cheadle, Cheshire; Monty was overseas, serving in a British regiment. Christie now lived alone at Ashfield with her mother. In 1902, she began attending Miss Guyer's Girls' School in Torquay, but found adjusting to the disciplined atmosphere difficult. In 1905, her mother sent her to Paris, where she was educated in a series of pensionnats (boarding schools), focusing on voice training and piano playing. Deciding she lacked the temperament and talent, she gave up her goal of performing professionally as a concert pianist or an opera singer.

=== 1907–1918: literary career and marriage ===
After completing her education, Christie returned to England to find her mother ailing. They decided to spend the winter of 1907–1908 in the warm climate of Egypt, which was then a regular tourist destination for wealthy Britons. They stayed for three months at the Gezirah Palace Hotel in Cairo. Christie attended many dances and other social functions; she particularly enjoyed watching amateur polo matches. While they visited some ancient Egyptian monuments such as the Great Pyramid of Giza, she did not exhibit the great interest in archaeology and Egyptology that developed in her later years. Returning to Britain, she continued her social activities, writing and performing in amateur theatrics. She also helped put on a play called The Blue Beard of Unhappiness with female friends.

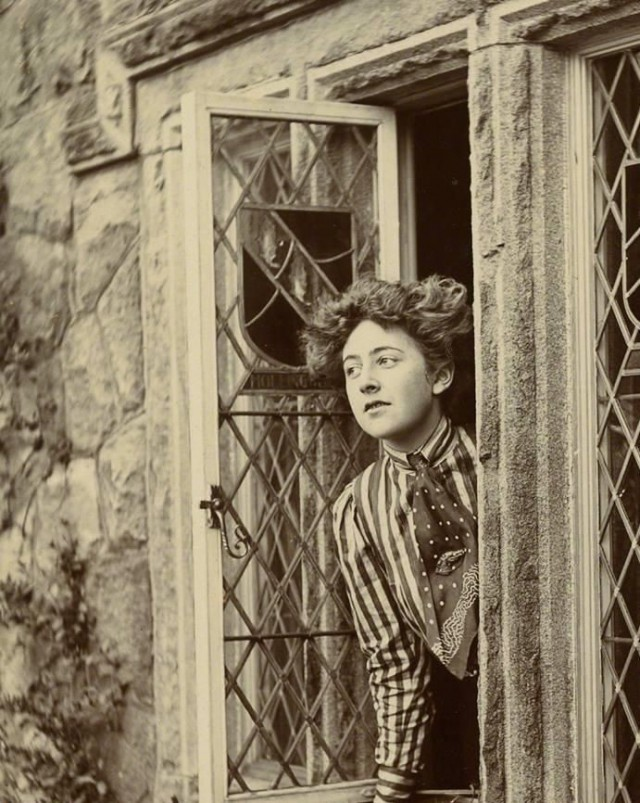
Christie in the 1910s

At 18, Christie wrote her first short story, "The House of Beauty", while recovering in bed from an illness. It consisted of about 6,000 words about "madness and dreams", subjects of fascination for her. Her biographer Janet Morgan has commented that despite "infelicities of style", the story was "compelling". (The story became an early version of her story "The House of Dreams".) Other stories followed, most of them illustrating her interest in spiritualism and the paranormal. These included "The Call of Wings" and "The Little Lonely God". Magazines rejected all her early submissions, made under pseudonyms (including Mac Miller, Nathaniel Miller, and Sydney West); some submissions were later revised and published under her real name, often with new titles.

Around the same time, Christie began work on her first novel, Snow Upon the Desert. Writing under the pseudonym Monosyllaba, she set the book in Cairo and drew upon her recent experiences there. She was disappointed when the six publishers she contacted declined the work. Clara suggested that her daughter ask for advice from the successful novelist Eden Phillpotts, a family friend and neighbour, who responded to her enquiry, encouraged her writing, and sent her an introduction to his own literary agent, Hughes Massie, who also rejected Snow Upon the Desert, but suggested a second novel.

Meanwhile, Christie's social activities expanded, with country house parties, riding, hunting, dances, and roller skating. She had short-lived relationships with four men and an engagement to another. In October 1912, she was introduced to Archibald Christie ("Archie") at a dance given by Lord and Lady Clifford at Ugbrooke, about 12 miles (19 km) from Torquay. The son of a barrister in the Indian Civil Service, Archie was a Royal Artillery officer who was seconded to the Royal Flying Corps in April 1913. The couple quickly fell in love. Three months after their first meeting, Archie proposed marriage, and Agatha accepted.

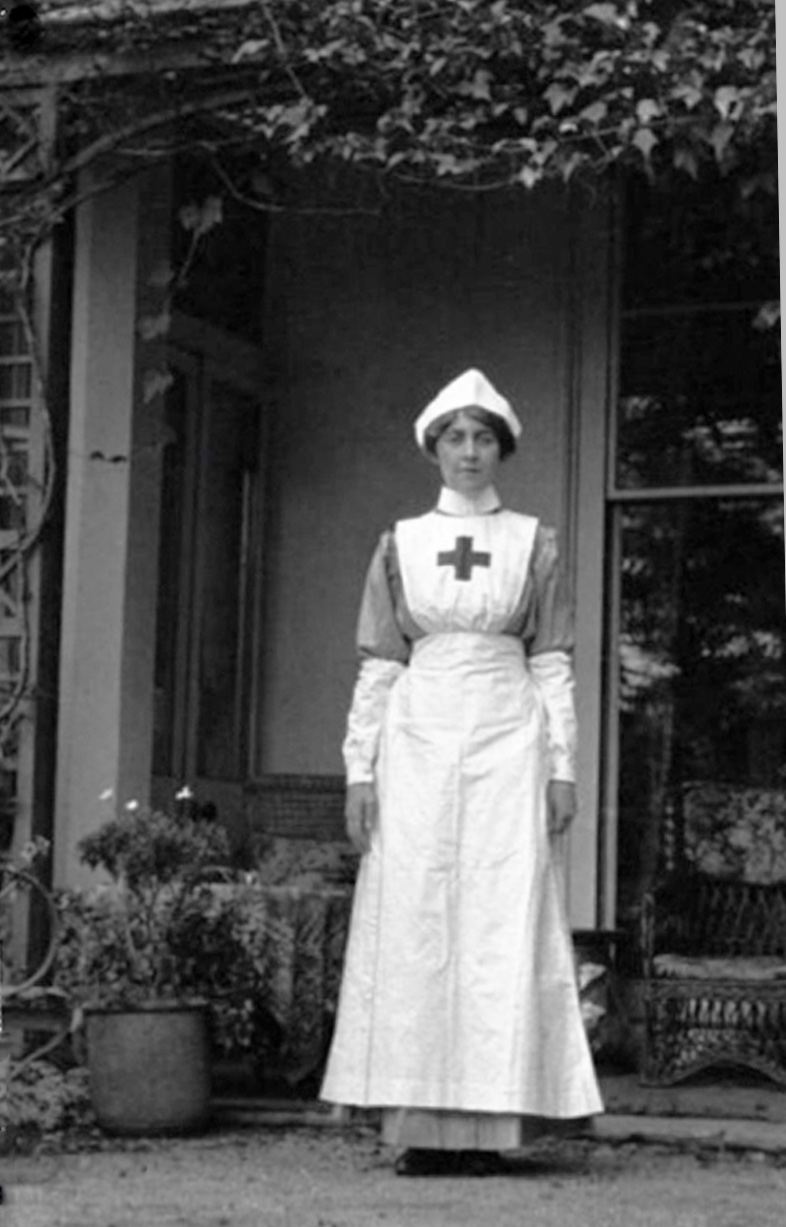
Christie as a nurse in the Voluntary Aid Detachment of the British Red Cross, pictured outside her childhood home of Ashfield in 1915.

With the outbreak of World War I in August 1914, Archie was sent to France to fight. They married on Christmas Eve 1914 at Emmanuel Church, Clifton, Bristol, close to the home of his mother and stepfather, when Archie was on home leave. Rising through the ranks, he was posted back to Britain in September 1918 as a colonel in the Air Ministry. Christie involved herself in the war effort as a member of the Voluntary Aid Detachment of the British Red Cross. From October 1914 to May 1915, then from June 1916 to September 1918, she worked 3,400 hours in the Town Hall Red Cross Hospital, Torquay, first as a Voluntary Aid Detachment nurse (unpaid) then as a dispenser at £16 (approximately equivalent to £960 in 2025) a year from 1917 after qualifying as an apothecary's assistant. Her war service ended in September 1918 when Archie was reassigned to London, and they rented a flat in St. John's Wood.

Christie had long been a fan of detective novels, having enjoyed Wilkie Collins's The Woman in White and The Moonstone, and Arthur Conan Doyle's early Sherlock Holmes stories. She wrote her first detective novel, The Mysterious Affair at Styles, in 1916. It featured Hercule Poirot, a former Belgian police officer with "magnificent moustaches" and a head "exactly the shape of an egg", who had taken refuge in Britain after Germany invaded Belgium. Christie's inspiration for the character came from Belgian refugees living in Torquay and the Belgian soldiers she helped to treat as a volunteer nurse during the First World War. Her original manuscript was rejected by Hodder & Stoughton and Methuen. After keeping the submission for several months, John Lane at The Bodley Head offered to accept it, provided that Christie change how the solution was revealed. She did so, and signed a contract committing her next five books to The Bodley Head, which she later felt was exploitative. It was published in 1920.

Christie settled into married life, giving birth to her only child, Rosalind Margaret Clarissa Christie (later Hicks), in August 1919 at Ashfield. Archie left the Air Force at the end of the war and began working in the City financial sector on a relatively low salary. They still employed a maid. Her second novel, The Secret Adversary (1922), featuring new detective couple Tommy and Tuppence, was also published by The Bodley Head. It earned her £50 (approximately equivalent to £2,500 in 2025). A third novel, Murder on the Links, again featured Poirot, as did the short stories commissioned by Bruce Ingram, editor of The Sketch magazine, from 1923. She now had no difficulty selling her work.

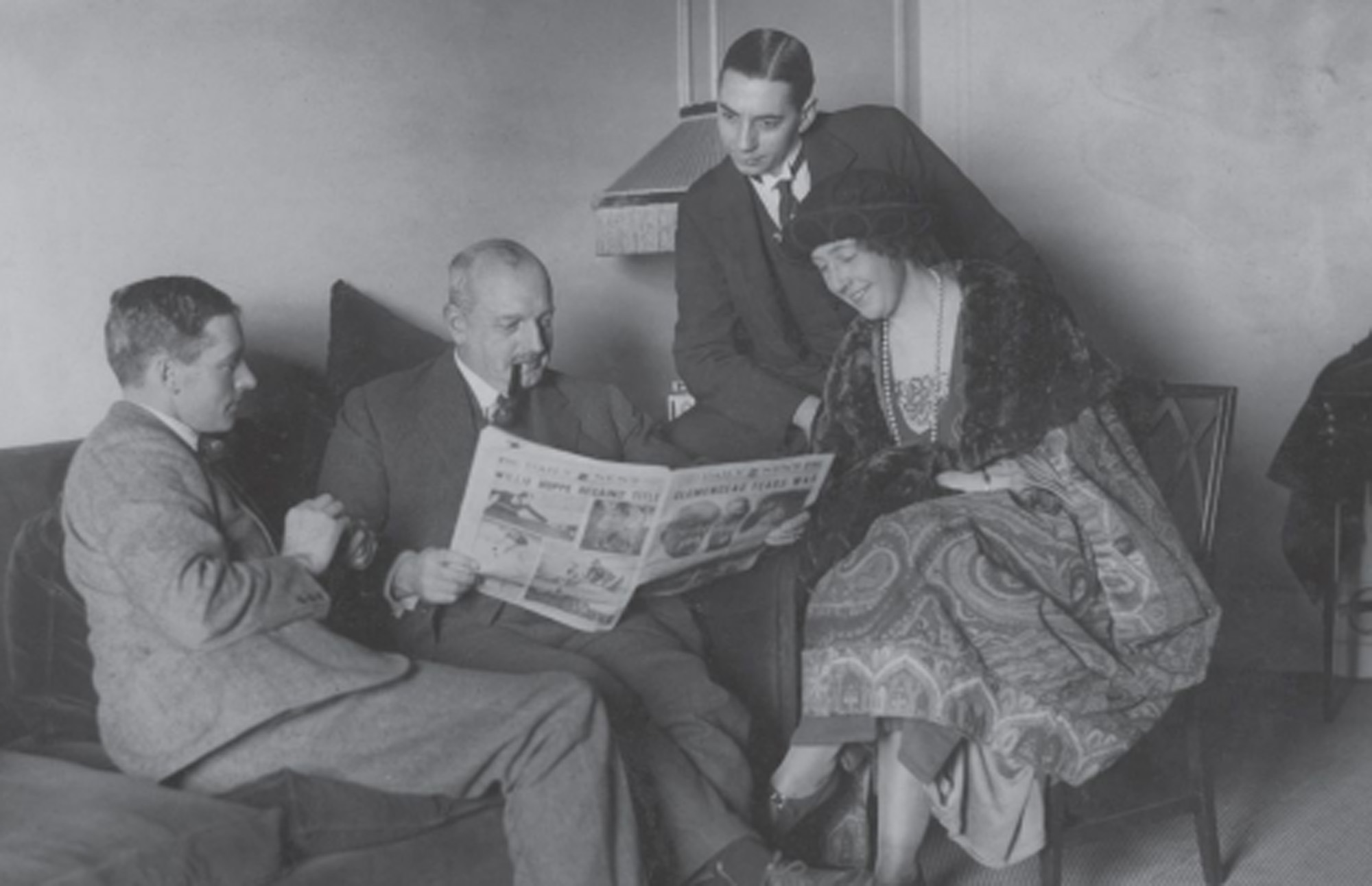
Archie Christie, Major Belcher, their secretary Mr. Bates, and Agatha Christie in 1922

In 1922, the Christies joined an around-the-world promotional tour for the British Empire Exhibition, led by Major Ernest Belcher. Leaving their daughter with Agatha's mother and sister, in 10 months, they travelled to South Africa, Australia, New Zealand, Hawaii, and Canada. They learned to surf prone in South Africa; then, in Waikiki, they were among the first Britons to surf standing up, and extended their time there by three months to practise. She is remembered at the Museum of British Surfing as having said about surfing, "Oh it was heaven! Nothing like rushing through the water at what seems to you a speed of about two hundred miles an hour. It is one of the most perfect physical pleasures I have known."

When they returned to England, Archie resumed work in the city, and Christie continued to work hard at her writing. After living in a series of apartments in London, they bought a house in Sunningdale, Berkshire, which they renamed Styles after the mansion in Christie's first detective novel.

Christie's mother, Clarissa Miller, died in April 1926. They had been close, and the loss sent Christie into a deep depression. In August 1926, reports appeared in the press that Christie had gone to a village near Biarritz to recuperate from a "breakdown" caused by "overwork".

=== 1926: Disappearance ===
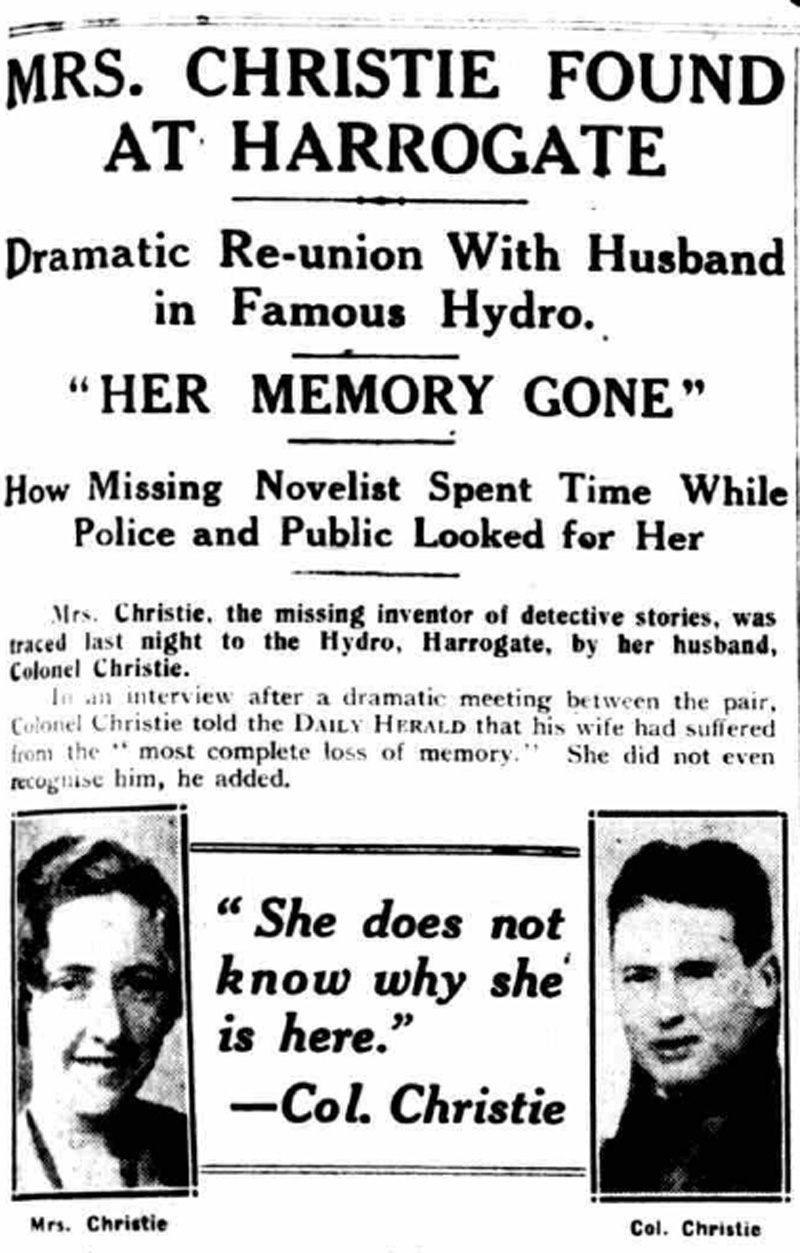
Daily Herald, 15 December 1926, announcing that Christie had been found

In August 1926, Archie asked Christie for a divorce. He had fallen in love with Nancy Neele, a friend of Major Belcher's. On 3 December 1926, the pair quarreled after Archie announced his plan to spend the weekend with friends including Neele unaccompanied by his wife. Late that evening, Christie disappeared from their home in Sunningdale. The following morning, her car, a Morris Cowley, was discovered at Newlands Corner in Surrey, parked above a chalk quarry with an expired driving licence and clothes inside. It was feared that she might have drowned herself in the Silent Pool, a nearby beauty spot.

The disappearance quickly became a news story. The press sought to satisfy their readers' "hunger for sensation, disaster, and scandal". Home Secretary William Joynson-Hicks pressured police, and a newspaper offered a £100 reward (equivalent to £5,400 in 2025). More than 1,000 police officers, 15,000 volunteers, and several aeroplanes searched the rural landscape (it was the first time that aircraft had been used in a civilian search operation). Sir Arthur Conan Doyle gave a spirit medium one of Christie's gloves to find her. (Note: Dorothy L. Sayers, who visited the "scene of the disappearance", later incorporated details in her book Unnatural Death.) Christie's disappearance made international headlines, including featuring on the front page of The New York Times. Despite the extensive manhunt, she was not found for another 10 days. On 4 December, the day after she went missing, it is now known she had tea in London and visited Harrods department store where she marvelled at the spectacle of the store's Christmas display. On 14 December 1926, she was located at the Swan Hydropathic Hotel in Harrogate, Yorkshire, 184 miles (296 km) north of her home in Sunningdale, registered as "Mrs Tressa (Note: A classified advertisement placed by Archie Christie in The Times (11 December 1926, p.1) ("Teresa Neele. Will any friend, relative, or nurse who was with Miss Teresa Neele, lately of Capetown, at any time during the past two years, and who can give any information as to her movements or present whereabouts, please communicate with Colonel Christie, 12, Stanhope-place, W.2.") gives the first name as Teresa, but her hotel register signature more naturally reads Tressa; newspapers reported that Christie used Tressa on other occasions during her disappearance (including joining a library).) Neele" (the surname of her husband's lover) from "Capetown [sic] S.A." (South Africa). The next day, Christie left for her sister's residence at Abney Hall, Cheadle, where she was sequestered "in guarded hall, gates locked, telephone cut off, and callers turned away".

Christie's autobiography makes no reference to the disappearance. Two doctors diagnosed her with "an unquestionable genuine loss of memory", yet opinion remains divided over the reason for her disappearance. Some, including her biographer Morgan, believe she disappeared during a fugue state. The author Jared Cade concluded that Christie planned the event to embarrass her husband but did not anticipate the resulting public melodrama. Christie's biographer Laura Thompson provides an alternative view that Christie disappeared during a nervous breakdown, conscious of her actions but not in emotional control of herself. Public reaction at the time was largely negative, supposing a publicity stunt or an attempt to frame her husband for murder. (Note: Christie hinted at a nervous breakdown, saying to a woman with similar symptoms, "I think you had better be very careful; it is probably the beginning of a nervous breakdown.")

=== 1927–1976: second marriage and later life ===
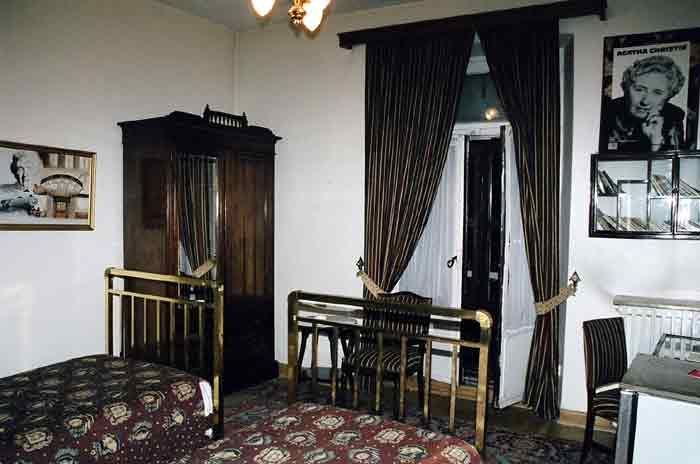
Christie's room at the Pera Palace Hotel in Istanbul, with her photo shown on the right

In January 1927, Christie, looking "very pale", sailed with her daughter and secretary to Las Palmas, Canary Islands, to "complete her convalescence", returning three months later. (Note: Christie's authorised biographer includes an account of specialist psychiatric treatment following Christie's disappearance, but the information was obtained second or third hand after her death.) Christie petitioned for divorce and was granted a decree nisi against her husband in April 1928, which was made absolute in October 1928. Archie married Nancy Neele a week later. Christie retained custody of their daughter, Rosalind, and kept the Christie surname for her writing. Reflecting on the period in her autobiography, Christie wrote, "So, after illness, came sorrow, despair and heartbreak. There is no need to dwell on it."

In 1928, Christie left England and took the (Simplon) Orient Express to Istanbul and then to Baghdad. In Iraq, she became friends with archaeologist Leonard Woolley and his wife, who invited her to return to their dig in February 1930. On that second trip, she met archaeologist Max Mallowan, 13 years her junior. In a 1977 interview, Mallowan recounted his first meeting with Christie, when he took her and a group of tourists on a tour of his expedition site in Iraq. Christie and Mallowan married in Edinburgh in September 1930. Their marriage lasted until Christie's death in 1976. She accompanied Mallowan on his archaeological expeditions, and her travels with him contributed background to several of her novels set in the Middle East. Other novels (such as Peril at End House) were set in and around Torquay, where she was raised. Christie drew on her experience of international train travel when writing her 1934 novel Murder on the Orient Express. The Pera Palace Hotel in Istanbul, the eastern terminus of the railway, claims the book was written there and maintains Christie's room as a memorial to the author. (Note: Other authors claim Christie wrote Murder on the Orient Express whilst at a dig at Arpachiyah.)

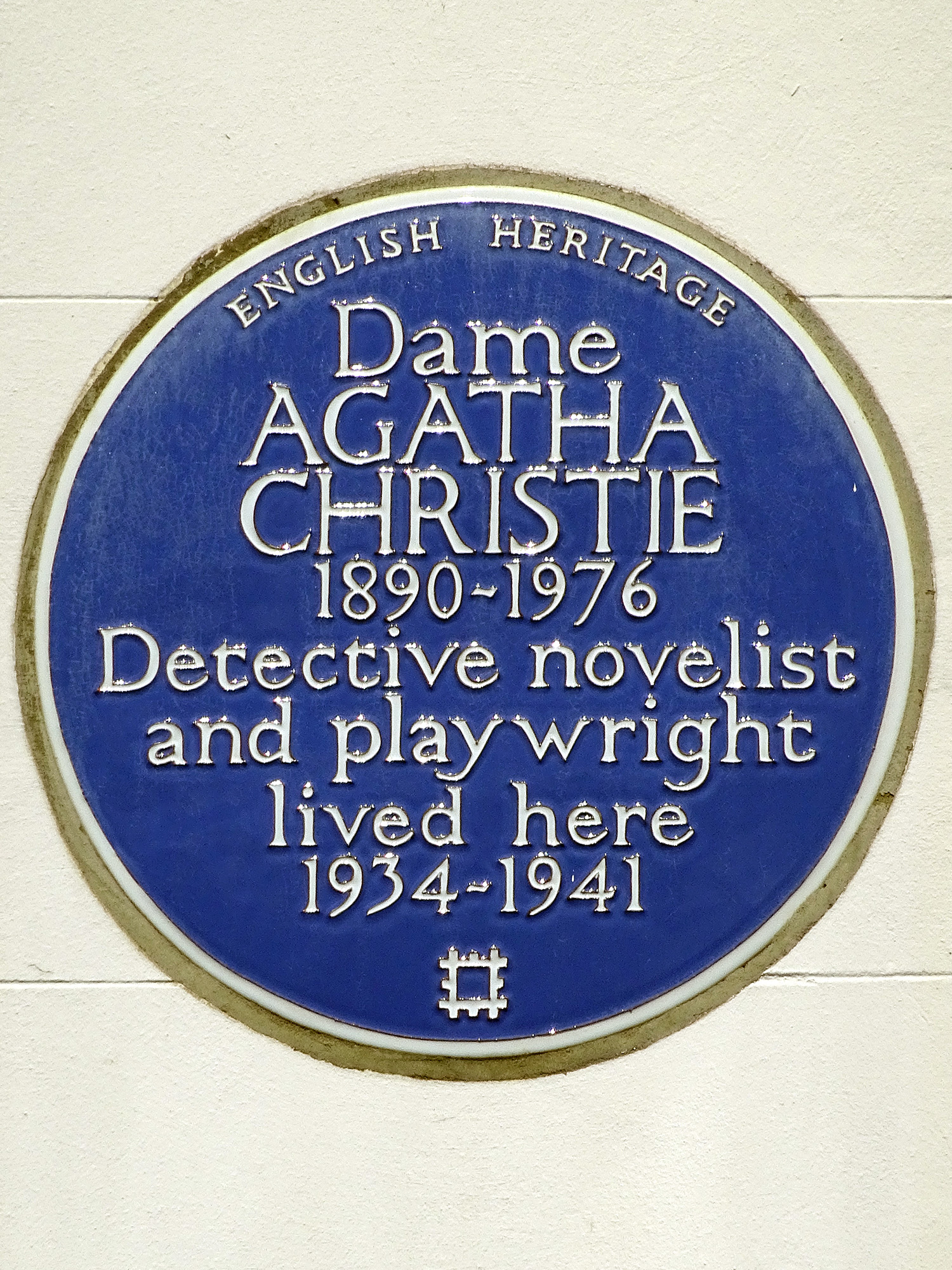
Blue plaque at 58 Sheffield Terrace, Holland Park, London

Christie and Mallowan first lived in Cresswell Place in Chelsea, and later in Sheffield Terrace, Holland Park, Kensington. Both properties are now marked by blue plaques. In 1934, they bought Winterbrook House in Winterbrook, a hamlet near Wallingford. This was their main residence for the rest of their lives and the place where Christie did much of her writing. This house also bears a blue plaque. Christie led a quiet life despite being known in Wallingford; from 1951 to 1976 she served as president of the local amateur dramatic society.

The couple acquired the Greenway Estate in Devon as a summer residence in 1938; it was given to the National Trust in 2000. Christie frequently stayed at Abney Hall, Cheshire, which was owned by her brother-in-law, James Watts, and based at least two stories there: a short story, "The Adventure of the Christmas Pudding", in the story collection of the same name and the novel After the Funeral. One Christie compendium notes that "Abney became Agatha's greatest inspiration for country-house life, with all its servants and grandeur being woven into her plots. The descriptions of the fictional Chimneys, Stonygates, and other houses in her stories are mostly Abney Hall in various forms."

During World War II, Christie moved to London and lived in a flat at the Isokon in Hampstead from 1941 to 1947, while working in the pharmacy at University College Hospital (UCH), London, where she updated her knowledge of poisons. Her later novel The Pale Horse was based on a suggestion from Harold Davis, the chief pharmacist at UCH. In 1977, a thallium poisoning case was solved by British medical personnel who had read Christie's book and recognised the symptoms she described.

The British intelligence agency MI5 investigated Christie after a character called Major Bletchley appeared in her 1941 thriller N or M?, which was about a hunt for a pair of deadly fifth columnists in wartime England. MI5 was concerned that Christie had a spy in Britain's top-secret codebreaking centre, Bletchley Park. The agency's fears were allayed when Christie told her friend, the codebreaker Dilly Knox, "I was stuck there on my way by train from Oxford to London and took revenge by giving the name to one of my least lovable characters."

Christie was elected a fellow of the Royal Society of Literature in 1950. In honour of her many literary works, Christie was appointed Commander of the Order of the British Empire (CBE) in the 1956 New Year Honours. She was co-president of the Detection Club from 1958 to her death in 1976. In 1961, she was awarded an honorary Doctor of Literature degree by the University of Exeter. In the 1971 New Year Honours, she was promoted to Dame Commander of the Order of the British Empire (DBE), three years after her husband had been knighted for his archaeological work. After her husband's knighthood, Christie could also be styled Lady Mallowan.

From 1971 to 1974, Christie's health began to fail, but she continued to write. Her last novel was Postern of Fate in 1973. Textual analysis suggests Christie may have begun to develop Alzheimer's disease or other dementia at about this time.

=== Personal qualities ===
In 1946, Christie said of herself: "My chief dislikes are crowds, loud noises, gramophones and cinemas. I dislike the taste of alcohol and do not like smoking. I do like sun, sea, flowers, travelling, strange foods, sports, concerts, theatres, pianos, and doing embroidery."

Christie was a lifelong, "quietly devout" member of the Church of England, attended church regularly, and kept her mother's copy of The Imitation of Christ by her bedside. After her divorce, she stopped taking the sacrament of communion.

The Agatha Christie Trust For Children was established in 1969, and shortly after Christie's death a charitable memorial fund was set up to "help two causes that she favoured: old people and young children".

Christie's obituary in The Times notes that "she never cared much for the cinema, or for wireless and television." Further,

Dame Agatha's private pleasures were gardening – she won local prizes for horticulture – and buying furniture for her various houses. She was a shy person: she disliked public appearances, but she was friendly and sharp-witted to meet. By inclination as well as breeding, she belonged to the English upper middle class. She wrote about, and for, people like herself. That was an essential part of her charm.

== Death and estate ==
=== Death and burial ===
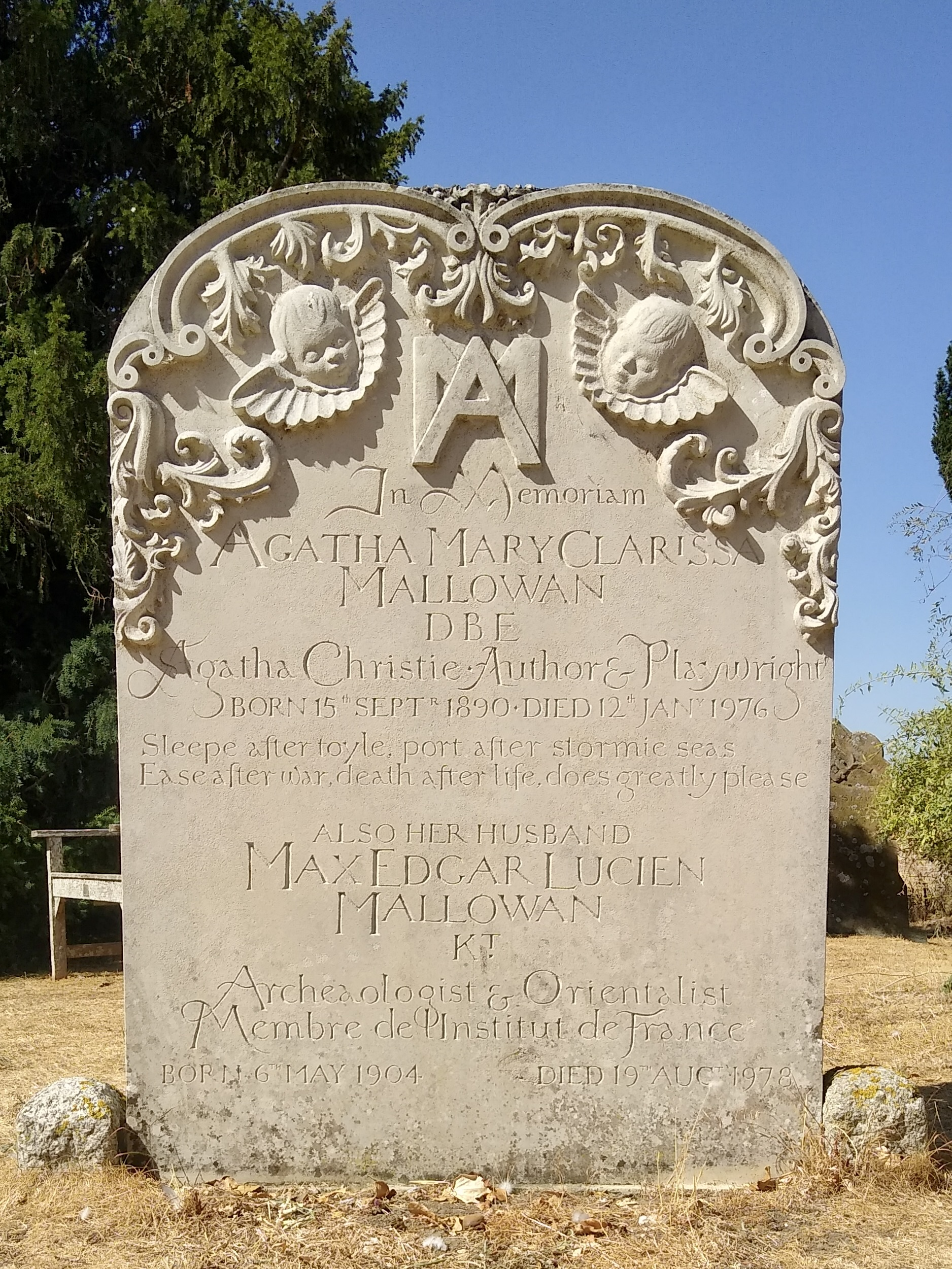
Christie's gravestone at St Mary's Church, Cholsey, Oxfordshire

Christie died from natural causes at her home at Winterbrook House on 12 January 1976, aged 85. Upon her death, two West End theatres – the St. Martin's, where The Mousetrap was playing, and the Savoy, which was home to a revival of Murder at the Vicarage – dimmed their outside lights in her honour. She was buried in the nearby churchyard of St Mary's, Cholsey, in a plot she had chosen with her husband 10 years previously. The simple funeral service was attended by about 20 newspaper and TV reporters, some having travelled from as far away as South America. Thirty wreaths adorned Christie's grave, including one from the cast of her long-running play The Mousetrap and one sent "on behalf of the multitude of grateful readers" by the Ulverscroft Large Print Book Publishers.

Mallowan, who remarried in 1977, died in 1978 and was buried next to Christie.

=== Estate and subsequent ownership of works ===
Christie was unhappy about becoming "an employed wage slave", and for tax reasons set up a private company in 1955, Agatha Christie Limited, to hold the rights to her works. In about 1959 she transferred her 278-acre home, Greenway Estate, to her daughter, Rosalind Hicks. In 1968, when Christie was almost 80, she sold a 51% stake in Agatha Christie Limited (and the works it owned) to Booker Books (better known as Booker Author's Division), which by 1977 had increased its stake to 64%. Agatha Christie Limited still owns the worldwide rights for more than 80 of Christie's novels and short stories, 19 plays, and nearly 40 TV films.

In the late 1950s, Christie had reputedly been earning around £100,000 (approximately equivalent to £2,000,000 in 2025) per year. Christie sold an estimated 300 million books during her lifetime. At the time of her death in 1976, "she was the best-selling novelist in history." One estimate of her total earnings from more than a half-century of writing is $20 million (approximately $113.2 million in 2025). As a result of her tax planning, her will left only £106,683 (Note: According to other sources, her estate was valued at £147 810.) (approximately equivalent to £719,000 in 2025) net, which went mostly to her husband and daughter along with some smaller bequests. Her remaining 36% share of Agatha Christie Limited was inherited by Hicks, who preserved her mother's works, image, and legacy until her own death 28 years later. The family's share of the company allowed them to appoint 50% of the board and the chairman, and retain a veto over new treatments, updated versions, and republications of her works.

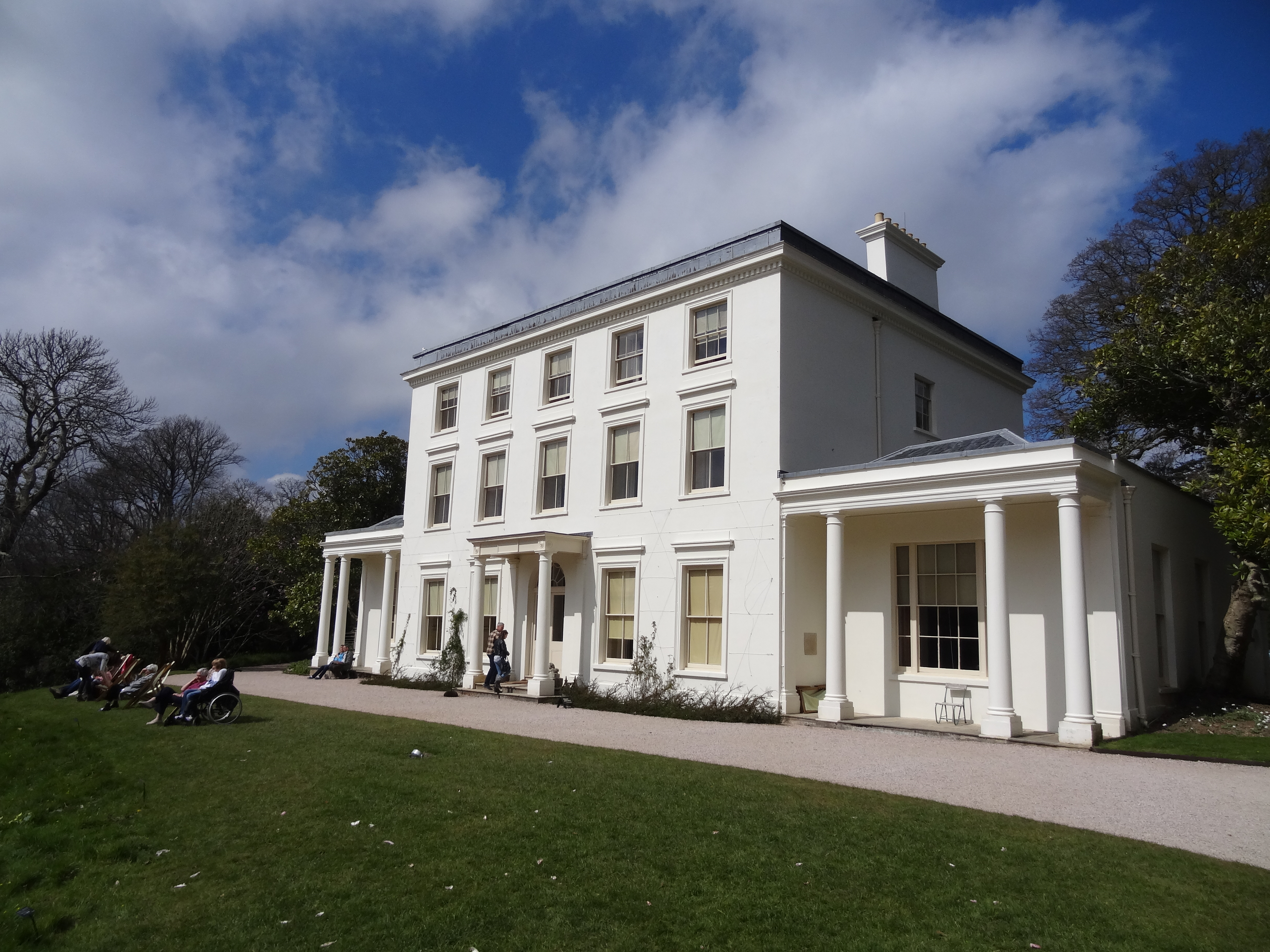
Greenway in Devon, Christie's summer home, was used as a setting for some of her plots, including Dead Man's Folly. The final episode of Agatha Christie's Poirot was filmed at the estate in 2013.

In 2004, Hicks' obituary in The Telegraph noted that she had been "determined to remain true to her mother's vision and to protect the integrity of her creations" and disapproved of "merchandising" activities. Upon her death on 28 October 2004, the Greenway Estate passed to her son Mathew Prichard. After his stepfather's death in 2005, Prichard donated Greenway and its contents to the National Trust.

Christie's family and family trusts, including great-grandson James Prichard, continue to own the 36% stake in Agatha Christie Limited, and remain associated with the company. In 2020, James Prichard was the company's chairman. Mathew Prichard also holds the copyright to some of his grandmother's later works including The Mousetrap. Christie's work continues to be developed in a range of adaptations.

In 1998, Booker sold its shares in Agatha Christie Limited (at the time earning £2,100,000, approximately equivalent to £4,100,000 in 2025 annual revenue) for £10,000,000 (approximately equivalent to £19,400,000 in 2025) to Chorion, whose portfolio of authors' works included the literary estates of Enid Blyton and Dennis Wheatley. In February 2012, after a management buyout, Chorion began to sell off its literary assets. This included the sale of Chorion's 64% stake in Agatha Christie Limited to Acorn Media UK. In 2014, RLJ Entertainment Inc. (RLJE) acquired Acorn Media UK, renamed it Acorn Media Enterprises, and incorporated it as the RLJE UK development arm.

In 2014, the BBC acquired exclusive TV rights to Christie's works in the UK (previously associated with ITV) and made plans with Acorn's co-operation to air new productions for the 125th anniversary of Christie's birth in 2015. Since then the BBC has broadcast Partners in Crime, And Then There Were None, The Witness for the Prosecution, Ordeal by Innocence, The A.B.C. Murders, The Pale Horse, Murder Is Easy and Towards Zero. A version of Endless Night has been announced.

Since 2020, reissues of Christie's Miss Marple and Hercule Poirot novels by HarperCollins have removed "passages containing descriptions, insults or references to ethnicity".

On 1 January 2026, several of Christie's landmark 1930 publications entered the public domain in the United States. This includes the first Miss Marple novel The Murder at the Vicarage and her debut stage play Black Coffee. Under the U.S. Copyright Term Extension Act, these works became freely available for publication and adaptation 95 years after their initial release, following the earlier expiration of copyrights for The Mysterious Affair at Styles and The Murder of Roger Ackroyd.

In jurisdictions with copyright terms of life of the author plus 50 years all of Christie's published works will come out of copyright at the start of 2027, whereas in those places with life of the author plus 70 years terms they will remain copyrighted until the start of 2047.

== Works ==
=== Works of fiction ===
==== Hercule Poirot and Miss Marple ====
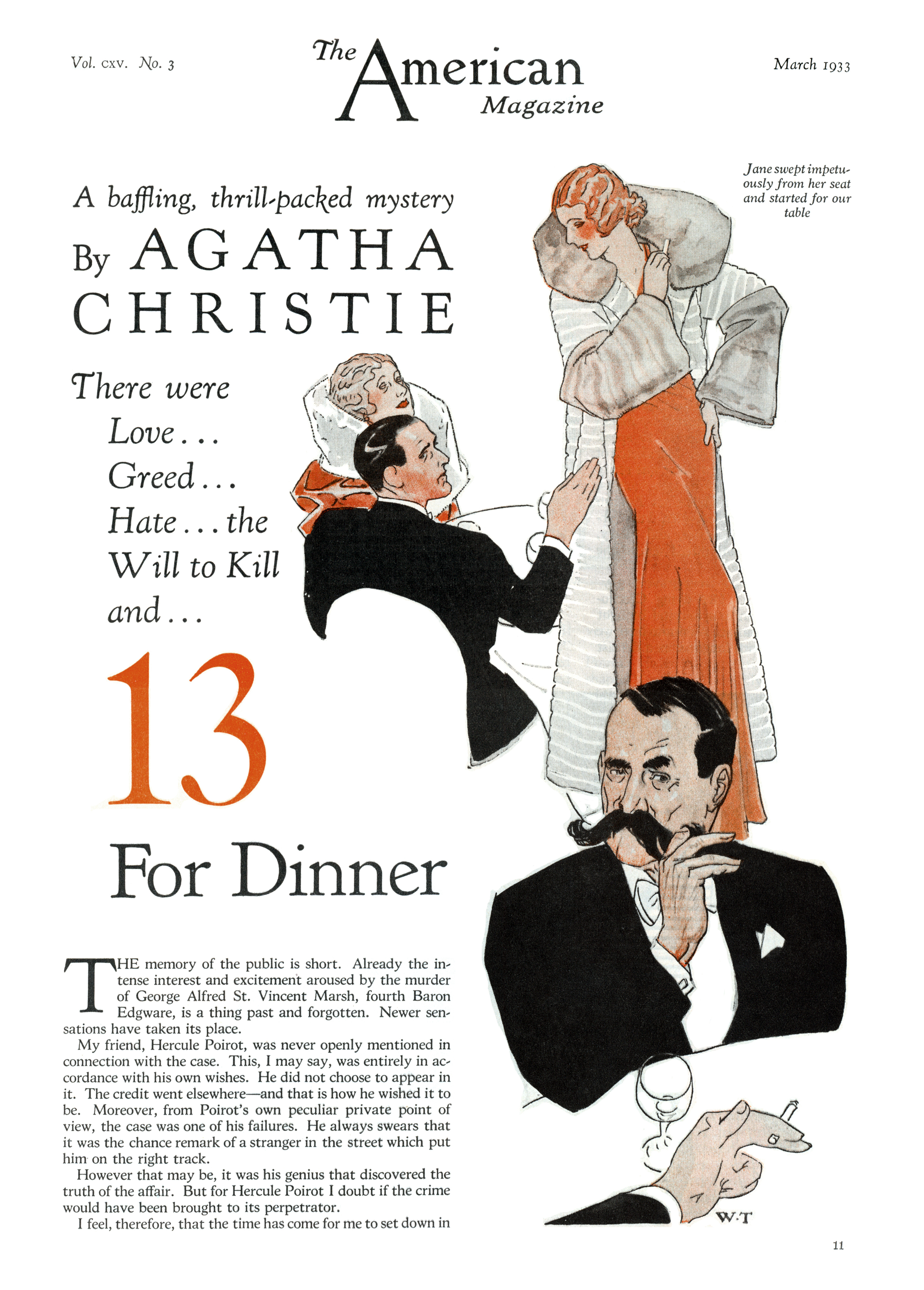
An early depiction of detective Hercule Poirot, from The American Magazine, March 1933

Christie's first published book, The Mysterious Affair at Styles, was released in 1920 and introduced the detective Hercule Poirot, who appeared in 33 of her novels and more than 50 short stories.

Over the years, Christie grew tired of Poirot, much as Doyle did with Sherlock Holmes. By the end of the 1930s, Christie wrote in her diary that she was finding Poirot "insufferable", and by the 1960s she felt he was "an egocentric creep". Thompson believes Christie's occasional antipathy to her creation is overstated, and points out that "in later life she sought to protect him against misrepresentation as powerfully as if he were her own flesh and blood". Unlike Doyle, she resisted the temptation to kill her detective off while he was still popular. She married off Poirot's "Watson", Captain Arthur Hastings, in an attempt to trim her cast commitments.

Miss Jane Marple was introduced in a series of short stories that began publication in December 1927 and were subsequently collected under the title The Thirteen Problems. Marple was a genteel, elderly spinster who solved crimes using analogies to English village life. Christie said, "Miss Marple was not in any way a picture of my grandmother; she was far more fussy and spinsterish than my grandmother ever was", but her autobiography establishes a firm connection between the fictional character and Christie's step-grandmother Margaret Miller ("Auntie-Grannie") (Note: Christie's familial relationship to Margaret Miller (née West) was complex. As well as being Christie's maternal great-aunt, Miller was Christie's father's step-mother as well as Christie's mother's foster mother and step-mother-in-law – hence the appellation "Auntie-Grannie".) and her "Ealing cronies". Both Marple and Miller "always expected the worst of everyone and everything, and were, with almost frightening accuracy, usually proved right". Marple appeared in 12 novels and 20 stories.

During the Second World War, Christie wrote two novels, Curtain and Sleeping Murder, featuring Hercule Poirot and Miss Marple, respectively. Both books were sealed in a bank vault, and she made over the copyrights by deed of gift to her daughter and her husband to provide each with a kind of insurance policy. Christie had a heart attack and a serious fall in 1974, after which she was unable to write. Her daughter authorised the publication of Curtain in 1975, and Sleeping Murder was published posthumously in 1976. These publications followed the success of the 1974 film version of Murder on the Orient Express.

Shortly before the publication of Curtain, Poirot became the first fictional character to have an obituary in The New York Times, which was printed on page one on 6 August 1975.

Christie never wrote a novel or short story featuring both Poirot and Miss Marple. In a recording discovered and released in 2008, Christie revealed the reason for this: "Hercule Poirot, a complete egoist, would not like being taught his business or having suggestions made to him by an elderly spinster lady. Hercule Poirot – a professional sleuth – would not be at home at all in Miss Marple's world."

In 2013, the Christie family supported the release of a new Poirot story, The Monogram Murders, written by British author Sophie Hannah. Hannah later published several more Poirot mysteries, Closed Casket in 2016, The Mystery of Three Quarters in 2018. The Killings at Kingfisher Hill in 2020, Hercule Poirot's Silent Night in 2023 with a sixth instalment being commissioned in 2024.

In 2021, following the success of Sophie Hannah's outings with Poirot, the Christie family supported the release of a collection of Miss Marple short stories. Called Marple, the collection was released in 2022 and each story was written by a different author. This included Naomi Alderman, Leigh Bardugo, Alyssa Cole, Lucy Foley, Elly Griffiths, Natalie Haynes, Jean Kwok, Val McDermid, Karen M. McManus, Dreda Say Mitchell, Kate Mosse and Ruth Ware.

==== Formula and plot devices ====
Early in her career, a reporter noted that "her plots are possible, logical, and always new". According to Hannah, "At the start of each novel, she shows us an apparently impossible situation and we go mad wondering 'How can this be happening?'. Then, slowly, she reveals how the impossible is not only possible but the only thing that could have happened."

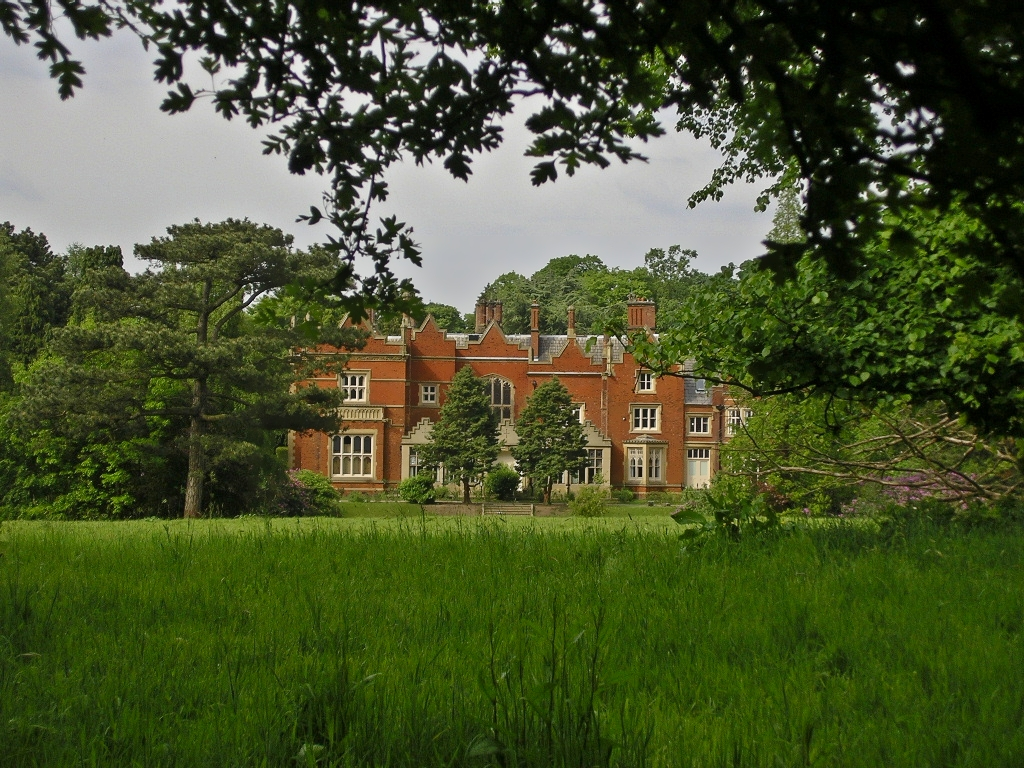
Abney Hall, Cheshire, the inspiration for Christie novel settings such as Chimneys and Stonygates

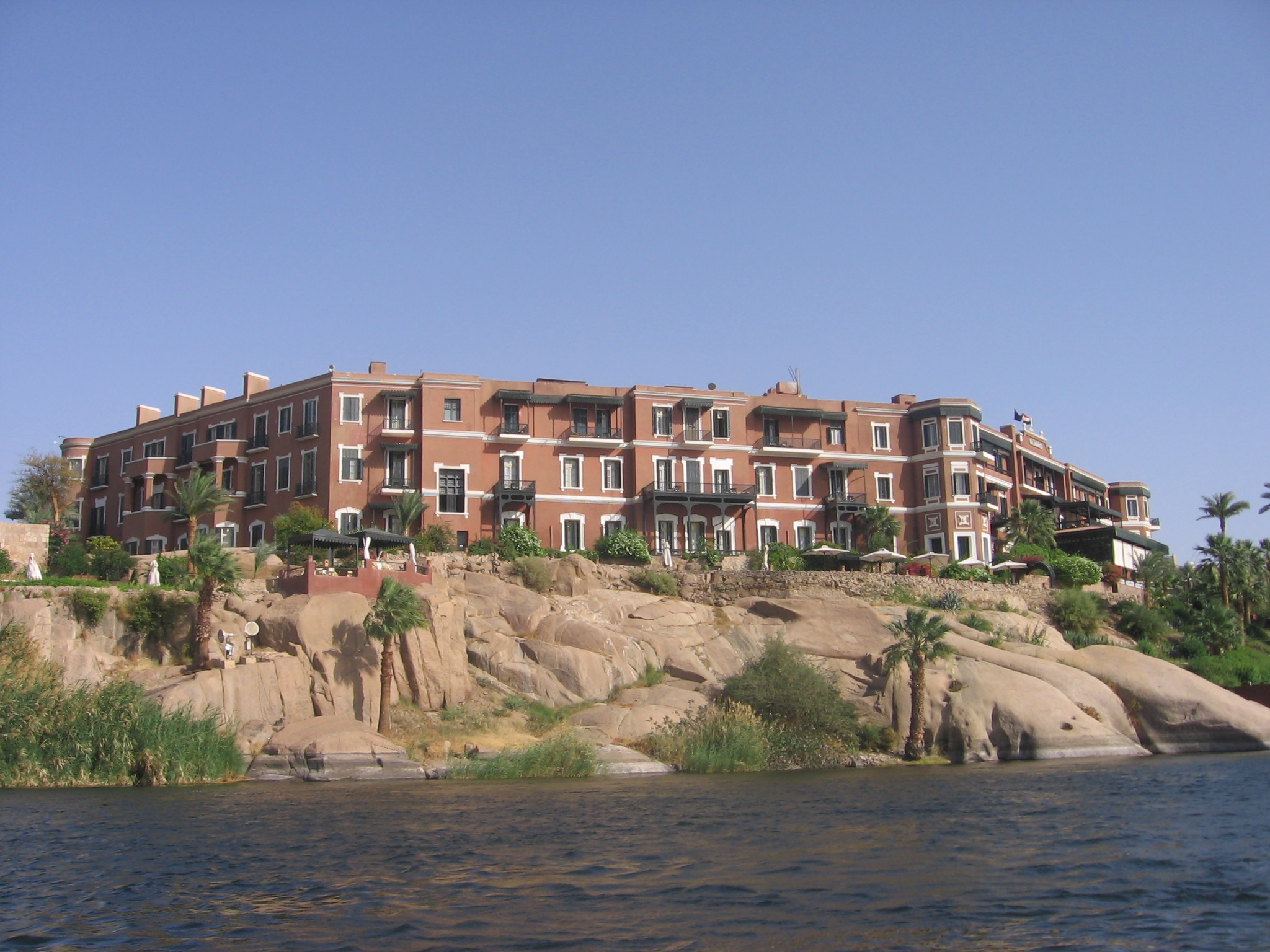
The Old Cataract Hotel on the banks of the River Nile in Aswan, Egypt where parts of Death on the Nile are set

Christie developed her storytelling techniques during what has been called the "Golden Age" of detective fiction. Author Dilys Winn called Christie "the doyenne of Coziness", a sub-genre which "featured a small village setting, a hero with faintly aristocratic family connections, a plethora of red herrings and a tendency to commit homicide with sterling silver letter openers and poisons imported from Paraguay". At the end, in a Christie hallmark, the detective usually gathers the surviving suspects into one room, explains the course of their deductive reasoning, and reveals the guilty party; but there are exceptions where it is left to the guilty party to explain all (such as And Then There Were None and Endless Night).

Christie did not limit herself to quaint English villages – the action might take place on a small island (And Then There Were None), an aeroplane (Death in the Clouds), a train (Murder on the Orient Express), a steamship (Death on the Nile), a smart London flat (Cards on the Table), a resort in the West Indies (A Caribbean Mystery), or an archaeological dig (Murder in Mesopotamia) – but the circle of potential suspects is usually closed and intimate: family members, friends, servants, business associates, fellow travellers. Stereotyped characters abound (the femme fatale, the stolid policeman, the devoted servant, the dull colonel), but these may be subverted to stymie the reader; impersonations and secret alliances are always possible. There is always a motive – most often, money: "There are very few killers in Christie who enjoy murder for its own sake."

Professor of Pharmacology Michael C. Gerald noted that "in over half her novels, one or more victims are poisoned, albeit not always to the full satisfaction of the perpetrator." Guns, knives, garrottes, tripwires, blunt instruments, and even a hatchet were also used, but "Christie never resorted to elaborate mechanical or scientific means to explain her ingenuity," according to John Curran, author and literary adviser to the Christie estate. Many of her clues are mundane objects: a calendar, a coffee cup, wax flowers, a beer bottle, a fireplace used during a heat wave.

According to crime writer P. D. James, Christie was prone to making the unlikeliest character the guilty party. Alert readers could sometimes identify the culprit by identifying the least likely suspect. Christie mocked this insight in her foreword to Cards on the Table: "Spot the person least likely to have committed the crime and in nine times out of ten your task is finished. Since I do not want my faithful readers to fling away this book in disgust, I prefer to warn them beforehand that this is not that kind of book."

On BBC Radio 4's Desert Island Discs in 2007, Brian Aldiss said Christie had told him she wrote her books up to the last chapter, then decided who the most unlikely suspect was, after which she would go back and make the necessary changes to "frame" that person. Based upon a study of her working notebooks, Curran describes how Christie would first create a cast of characters, choose a setting, and then produce a list of scenes in which specific clues would be revealed; the order of scenes would be revised as she developed her plot. Of necessity, the murderer had to be known to the author before the sequence could be finalised and she began to type or dictate the first draft of her novel. Much of the work, particularly dialogue, was done in her head before she put it on paper.

In 2013, the 600 members of the Crime Writers' Association chose The Murder of Roger Ackroyd as "the best whodunit ... ever written". Author Julian Symons observed, "In an obvious sense, the book fits within the conventions ... The setting is a village deep within the English countryside, Roger Ackroyd dies in his study; there is a butler who behaves suspiciously ... Every successful detective story in this period involved a deceit practised upon the reader, and here the trick is the highly original one of making the murderer the local doctor, who tells the story and acts as Poirot's Watson." Critic Sutherland Scott stated, "If Agatha Christie had made no other contribution to the literature of detective fiction she would still deserve our grateful thanks" for writing this novel.

In September 2015, to mark her 125th birthday, And Then There Were None was named the "World's Favourite Christie" in a vote sponsored by the author's estate. The novel is emblematic of both her use of formula and her willingness to discard it. "And Then There Were None carries the 'closed society' type of murder mystery to extreme lengths," according to author Charles Osborne. It begins with the classic set-up of potential victim(s) and killer(s) isolated from the outside world, but then violates conventions. There is no detective involved in the action, no interviews of suspects, no careful search for clues, and no suspects gathered together in the last chapter to be confronted with the solution. As Christie herself said, "Ten people had to die without it becoming ridiculous or the murderer being obvious." Critics agreed she had succeeded: "The arrogant Mrs. Christie this time set herself a fearsome test of her own ingenuity ... the reviews, not surprisingly, were without exception wildly adulatory."

==== Character stereotypes and racism ====
Christie included stereotyped descriptions of characters in her work, especially before 1945 (when such attitudes were more commonly expressed publicly), particularly in regard to Italians, Jews, and non-Europeans. For example, she described "men of Hebraic extraction, sallow men with hooked noses, wearing rather flamboyant jewellery" in the short story "The Soul of the Croupier" from the collection The Mysterious Mr Quin. In 1947, the Anti-Defamation League in the US sent an official letter of complaint to Christie's American publishers, Dodd, Mead and Company, regarding perceived antisemitism in her works. Christie's British literary agent later wrote to her US representative, authorising American publishers to "omit the word 'Jew' when it refers to an unpleasant character in future books."

In The Hollow, published in 1946, one of the characters is described by another as "a Whitechapel Jewess with dyed hair and a voice like a corncrake ... a small woman with a thick nose, henna red hair and a disagreeable voice". To contrast with the more stereotyped descriptions, Christie portrayed some foreign characters as victims, or potential victims, at the hands of English malefactors, such as, respectively, Olga Seminoff (Hallowe'en Party) and Katrina Reiger (in the short story "How Does Your Garden Grow?"). Jewish characters are often seen as un-English (such as Oliver Manders in Three Act Tragedy), but they are rarely the culprits.

In 2023, the Telegraph reported that several Agatha Christie novels have been edited to remove "passages containing descriptions, insults or references to ethnicity". Poirot and Miss Marple mysteries written between 1920 and 1976 have had passages reworked or removed in new editions published by HarperCollins, in order to strip them of language and descriptions that modern audiences find offensive, especially those involving the characters Christie's protagonists encounter outside the UK. Sensitivity readers had made the edits, which were evident in digital versions of the new editions, including the entire Miss Marple run and selected Poirot novels set to be released or that have been released since 2020.

==== Other detectives ====
In addition to Hercule Poirot and Miss Marple, Christie also created amateur detectives Thomas (Tommy) Beresford and his wife, Prudence "Tuppence" Beresford (née Cowley), who appear in four novels and one collection of short stories published between 1922 and 1974. Unlike her other sleuths, the Beresfords were only in their early twenties when introduced in The Secret Adversary, and were allowed to age alongside their creator. She treated their stories with a lighter touch, giving them a "dash and verve" which was not universally admired by critics. Their last adventure, Postern of Fate, was Christie's last novel.

Harley Quin was "easily the most unorthodox" of Christie's fictional detectives. Inspired by Christie's affection for the figures from the Harlequinade, the semi-supernatural Quin always works with an elderly, conventional man called Satterthwaite. The pair appear in 14 short stories, 12 of which were collected in 1930 as The Mysterious Mr Quin. Mallowan described these tales as "detection in a fanciful vein, touching on the fairy story, a natural product of Agatha's peculiar imagination". Satterthwaite also appears in a novel, Three Act Tragedy, and a short story, "Dead Man's Mirror", both of which feature Poirot.

Another of her lesser-known characters is Parker Pyne, a retired civil servant who assists unhappy people in an unconventional manner. The 12 short stories which introduced him, Parker Pyne Investigates (1934), are best remembered for "The Case of the Discontented Soldier", which features Ariadne Oliver, "an amusing and satirical self-portrait of Agatha Christie". Over the ensuing decades, Oliver reappeared in seven novels. In most of them she assists Poirot.

==== Plays ====
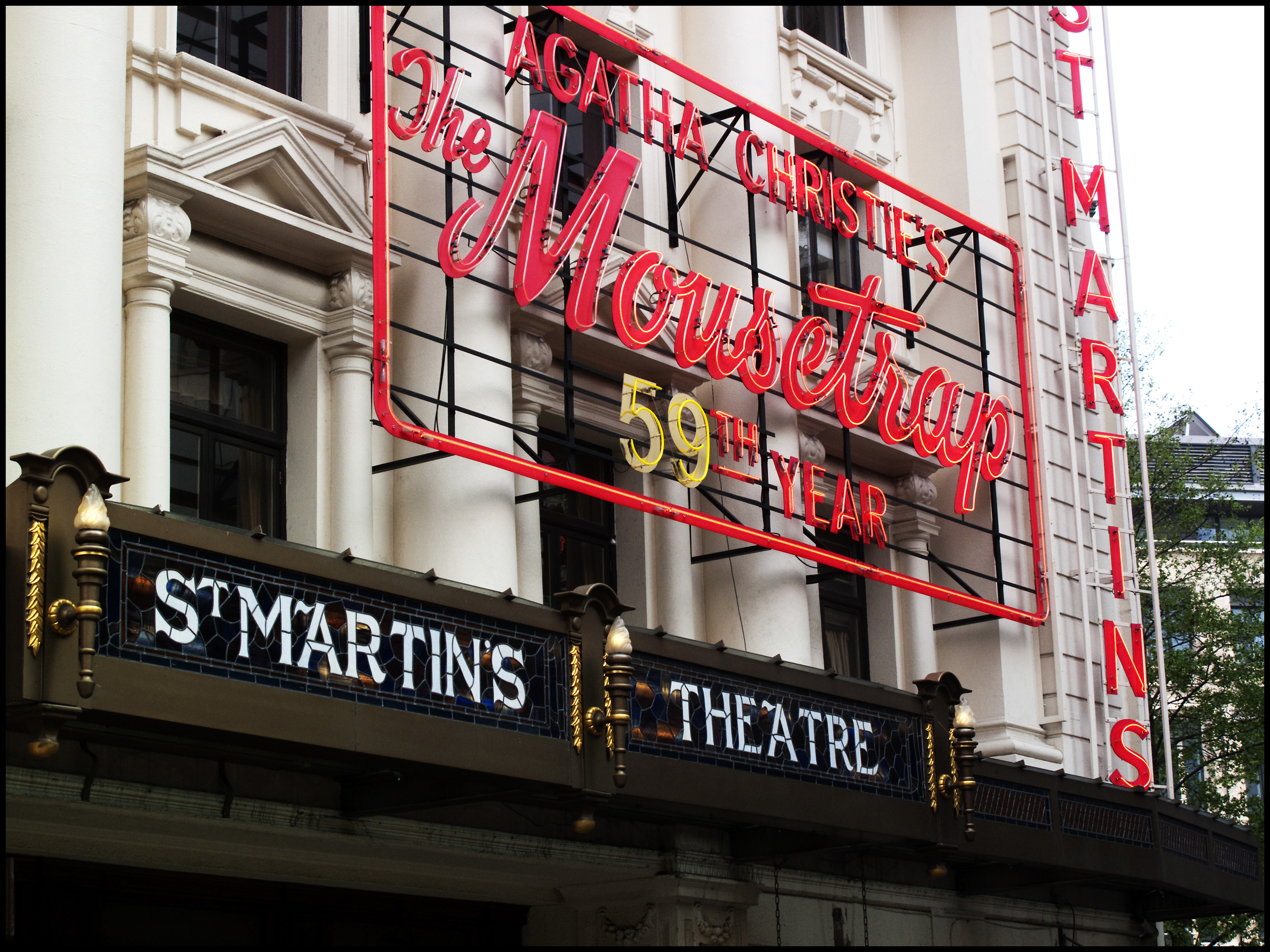
The Mousetrap, the world's longest-running play, showing at the West End's St Martin's Theatre in 2011, with the sign signifying the 59th year of the production

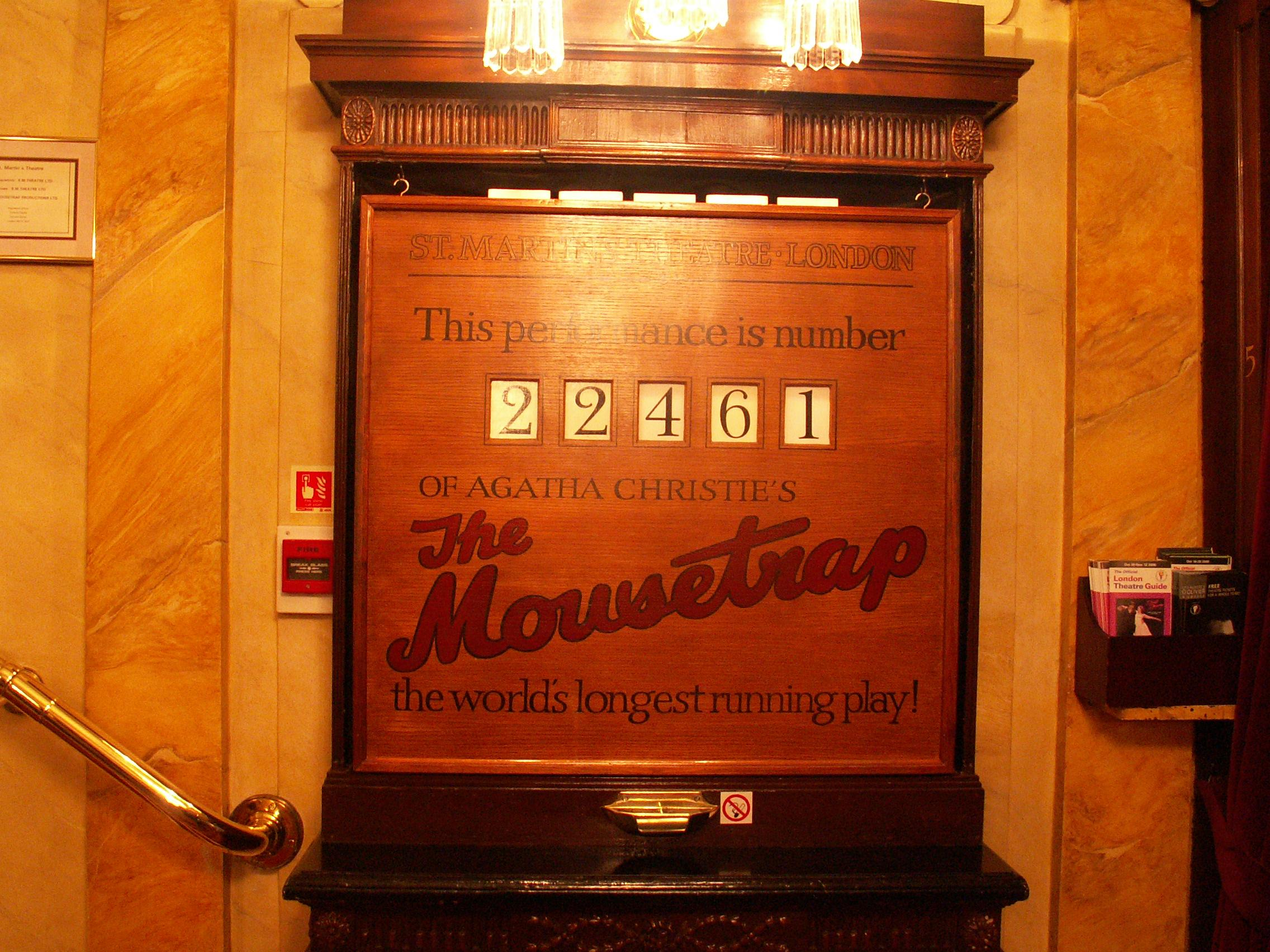
The wooden counter in the foyer of St Martin's Theatre showing 22,461 performances of The Mousetrap (pictured in November 2006). Attendees often get their photo taken next to it.

In 1928, Michael Morton adapted The Murder of Roger Ackroyd for the stage under the name of Alibi. The play enjoyed a respectable run, but Christie disliked the changes made to her work and, in future, preferred to write for the theatre herself. The first of her own stage works was Black Coffee, which received good reviews when it opened in the West End in late 1930. She followed this up with adaptations of her detective novels: And Then There Were None in 1943, Appointment with Death in 1945, and The Hollow in 1951.

In the 1950s, "the theatre ... engaged much of Agatha's attention." She next adapted her short radio play into The Mousetrap, which premiered in the West End in 1952, produced by Peter Saunders and starring Richard Attenborough as the original Detective Sergeant Trotter. Her expectations for the play were not high; she believed it would run no more than eight months. The Mousetrap has long since made theatrical history as the world's longest-running play, staging its 27,500th performance in September 2018. The play temporarily closed in March 2020, when all UK theatres shut due to the coronavirus pandemic, before it re-opened on 17 May 2021.

In 1953, she followed this with Witness for the Prosecution, whose Broadway production won the New York Drama Critics' Circle award for best foreign play of 1954 and earned Christie an Edgar Award from the Mystery Writers of America. Spider's Web, an original work written for actress Margaret Lockwood at her request, premiered in the West End in 1954 and was also a hit. Christie became the first female playwright to have three plays running simultaneously in London: The Mousetrap, Witness for the Prosecution and Spider's Web. She said, "Plays are much easier to write than books, because you can see them in your mind's eye, you are not hampered by all that description which clogs you so terribly in a book and stops you from getting on with what's happening." In a letter to her daughter, Christie said being a playwright was "a lot of fun!"

==== As Mary Westmacott ====
Christie published six mainstream novels under the name Mary Westmacott, a pseudonym which gave her the freedom to explore "her most private and precious imaginative garden". These books typically received better reviews than her detective and thriller fiction. Of the first, Giant's Bread published in 1930, a reviewer for The New York Times wrote, "... her book is far above the average of current fiction, in fact, comes well under the classification of a 'good book'. And it is only a satisfying novel that can claim that appellation."

It was publicized from the very beginning that "Mary Westmacott" was a pen name of a well-known author, although the identity behind the pen name was kept secret; the dust jacket of Giant's Bread mentions that the author had previously written "under her real name...half a dozen books that have each passed the thirty thousand mark in sales." (In fact, though this was technically true, it disguised Christie's identity through understatement. By the publication of Giant's Bread, Christie had published 10 novels and two short story collections, every one of which had sold considerably more than 30,000 copies.) After Christie's authorship of the first four Westmacott novels was revealed by a journalist in 1949, she wrote two more, the last in 1956.

The other Westmacott titles are: Unfinished Portrait (1934), Absent in the Spring (1944), The Rose and the Yew Tree (1948), A Daughter's a Daughter (1952), and The Burden (1956).

=== Non-fiction works ===
Christie published a few non-fiction works. Come, Tell Me How You Live, about working on an archaeological dig, was drawn from her life with Mallowan. The Grand Tour: Around the World with the Queen of Mystery is a collection of correspondence from her 1922 Grand Tour of the British Empire, including South Africa, Australia, New Zealand, and Canada. Agatha Christie: An Autobiography was published posthumously in 1977 and adjudged the Best Critical/Biographical Work at the 1978 Edgar Awards.

=== Titles ===
Many of Christie's works from 1940 onward have titles drawn from literature, with the original context of the title typically printed as an epigraph.

The inspirations for some of Christie's titles include:

- William Shakespeare's works: Sad Cypress, By the Pricking of My Thumbs, Taken at the Flood , Absent in the Spring, and The Mousetrap, for example. Osborne notes that "Shakespeare is the writer most quoted in the works of Agatha Christie";
- The Bible: Evil Under the Sun, The Burden, and The Pale Horse;
- Other works of literature: The Mirror Crack'd from Side to Side (from Tennyson's "The Lady of Shalott"), The Moving Finger (from Edward FitzGerald's translation of the Rubáiyát of Omar Khayyám), The Rose and the Yew Tree (from T. S. Eliot's Four Quartets), Postern of Fate (from James Elroy Flecker's "Gates of Damascus"), Endless Night (from William Blake's "Auguries of Innocence"), N or M? (from the Book of Common Prayer), and Come, Tell Me How You Live (from Lewis Carroll's Through the Looking-Glass).

Christie biographer Gillian Gill said, "Christie's writing has the sparseness, the directness, the narrative pace, and the universal appeal of the fairy story, and it is perhaps as modern fairy stories for grown-up children that Christie's novels succeed." Reflecting a juxtaposition of innocence and horror, numerous Christie titles were drawn from well-known children's nursery rhymes: And Then There Were None (from "Ten Little Niggers", a rhyme also published as "Ten Little Indians", both of which were also used for the book's title in some printings), One, Two, Buckle My Shoe (from "One, Two, Buckle My Shoe"), Five Little Pigs (from "This Little Piggy"), Crooked House (from "There Was a Crooked Man"), A Pocket Full of Rye (from "Sing a Song of Sixpence"), Hickory Dickory Dock (from "Hickory Dickory Dock"), and Three Blind Mice (from "Three Blind Mice").

== Critical reception ==
Christie is regularly referred to as the "Queen of Crime"—which is now trademarked by the Christie estate—or "Queen of Mystery", and is considered a master of suspense, plotting, and characterisation. In 1955, she became the first recipient of the Mystery Writers of America's Grand Master Award. She was named "Best Writer of the Century" and the Hercule Poirot series of books was named "Best Series of the Century" at the 2000 Bouchercon World Mystery Convention. In 2008, The Times named Christie the third greatest crime writer of all time after Patricia Highsmith and Georges Simenon. In 2013, she was voted "best crime writer" in a survey of 600 members of the Crime Writers' Association of professional novelists. However, the writer Raymond Chandler criticised the artificiality of her books, as did writer Julian Symons. The literary critic Edmund Wilson described her prose as banal and her characterisations as superficial. (Note: Wilson's 1945 essay, "Who Cares Who Killed Roger Ackroyd?" was dismissive of the detective fiction genre in general but did not mention Christie by name.)

"With Christie ... we are dealing not so much with a literary figure as with a broad cultural phenomenon, like Barbie or the Beatles."

— Joan Acocella writing in The New Yorker

In 2011, Christie was named by the digital crime drama TV channel Alibi as the second most financially successful crime writer of all time in the United Kingdom, after James Bond author Ian Fleming, with total earnings around £100 million. In 2012, Christie was among the people selected by the artist Peter Blake to appear in a new version of his most famous work, the Beatles' Sgt. Pepper's Lonely Hearts Club Band album cover, "to celebrate the British cultural figures he most admires". On the record-breaking longevity of Christie's The Mousetrap which had marked its 60th anniversary in 2012, Stephen Moss in The Guardian wrote, "the play and its author are the stars".

In 2015, marking the 125th anniversary of her birth date, 25 contemporary mystery writers and one publisher gave their views on Christie's works. Many of the authors had read Christie's novels first, before other mystery writers, in English or in their native language, influencing their own writing, and nearly all still viewed her as the preeminent crime novelist and creator of the plot twists used by mystery authors. Nearly all had one or more favourites among Christie's mysteries and found her books still good to read nearly 100 years after her first novel was published. Just one of the 25 authors held with Wilson's views.

=== Book sales ===
In her prime, Christie was rarely out of the bestseller list. In 1948 Penguin reissued ten of Christie's books on the same day, each with a print run of a 100,000 copies, making one million copies in all. As of 2018, Guinness World Records listed Christie as the best-selling fiction writer of all time. As of 2020, her novels had sold more than two billion copies in 44 languages. Half the sales are of English-language editions, and half are translations. According to Index Translationum, as of 2020, she was the most-translated individual author.

Christie is one of the most-borrowed authors in UK libraries. She is also the UK's best-selling spoken-book author. In 2002, 117,696 Christie audiobooks were sold, in comparison to 97,755 for J. K. Rowling, 78,770 for Roald Dahl and 75,841 for J. R. R. Tolkien. In 2015, the Christie estate claimed And Then There Were None was "the best-selling crime novel of all time", with approximately 100 million sales, also making it one of the highest-selling books of all time. More than two million copies of her books were sold in English in 2020.

== Legacy ==
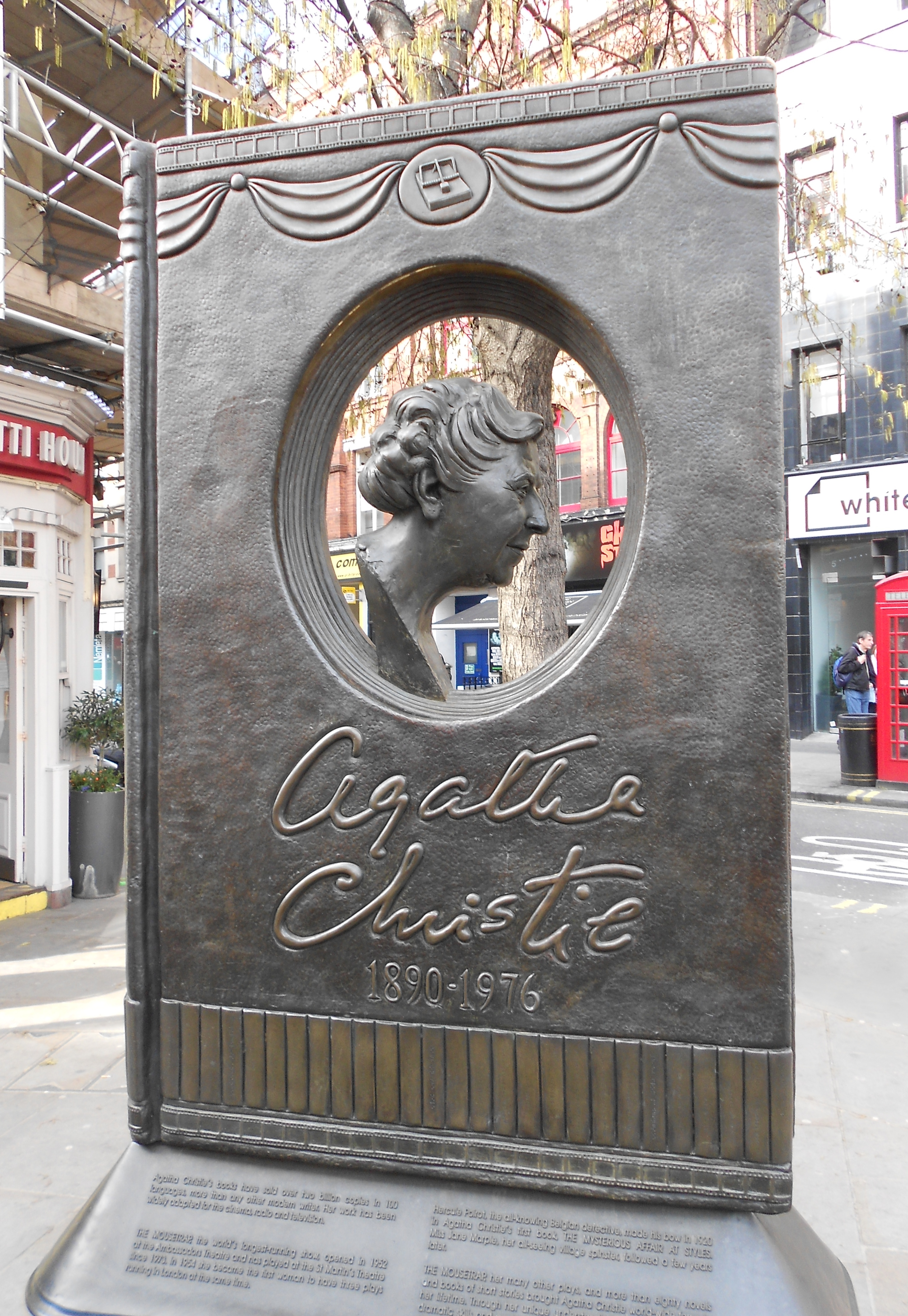
Memorial to Christie in central London

In 2016, the Royal Mail marked the centenary of Christie's first detective story by issuing six first-class postage stamps of her works: The Mysterious Affair at Styles, The Murder of Roger Ackroyd, Murder on the Orient Express, And Then There Were None, The Body in the Library, and A Murder is Announced. The Guardian reported that, "Each design incorporates microtext, UV ink and thermochromic ink. These concealed clues can be revealed using either a magnifying glass, UV light or body heat and provide pointers to the mysteries' solutions."

Her characters and her face appeared on the stamps of many countries like Dominica and the Somali Republic. In 2020, Christie was commemorated on a £2 coin by the Royal Mint for the first time to mark the centenary of her first novel, The Mysterious Affair at Styles.

In 2023 a life-size bronze statue of Christie sitting on a park bench holding a book was unveiled in Wallingford, Oxfordshire.

=== Adaptations ===
Christie's works have been adapted for cinema and television. The first was the 1928 British film The Passing of Mr. Quin. Poirot's first film appearance was in 1931 in Alibi, which starred Austin Trevor as Christie's sleuth. Margaret Rutherford played Marple in a series of films released in the 1960s. Christie liked her acting, but considered the first film "pretty poor" and thought no better of the rest. She felt differently about the 1974 film Murder on the Orient Express, directed by Sidney Lumet, which featured major stars and high production values; her attendance at the London premiere was one of her last public outings. In 2017, a new film version was released, directed by Kenneth Branagh, who also starred, wearing "the most extravagant mustache moviegoers have ever seen". Branagh has since directed two more adaptations of Christie, Death on the Nile (2022) and its sequel A Haunting in Venice (2023), the latter an adaptation of her 1969 novel Hallowe'en Party.

The television adaptation Agatha Christie's Poirot (1989–2013), with David Suchet in the title role, ran for 70 episodes over 13 series. It received nine BAFTA award nominations and won four BAFTA awards in 1990–1992. The television series Miss Marple (1984–1992), with Joan Hickson as "the BBC's peerless Miss Marple", adapted all 12 Marple novels. The French television series Les Petits Meurtres d'Agatha Christie (2009–2012, 2013–2020), adapted 36 of Christie's stories.

Christie's books have also been adapted for BBC Radio, a video game series, and graphic novels.

== Interests and influences ==
=== Pharmacology ===
During the First World War, Christie took a break from nursing to train for the Apothecaries Hall Examination. While she subsequently found dispensing in the hospital pharmacy monotonous, and thus less enjoyable than nursing, her new knowledge provided her with a background in potentially toxic drugs. Early in the Second World War, she brought her skills up to date at Torquay Hospital.

As Michael C. Gerald puts it, her "activities as a hospital dispenser during both World Wars not only supported the war effort but also provided her with an appreciation of drugs as therapeutic agents and poisons ... These hospital experiences were also likely responsible for the prominent role physicians, nurses, and pharmacists play in her stories." There were to be many medical practitioners, pharmacists, and scientists, naïve or suspicious, in Christie's cast of characters; featuring in Murder in Mesopotamia, Cards on the Table, The Pale Horse, and Mrs. McGinty's Dead, among many others.

Gillian Gill notes that the murder method in Christie's first detective novel, The Mysterious Affair at Styles, "comes right out of Agatha Christie's work in the hospital dispensary". In an interview with journalist Marcelle Bernstein, Christie stated, "I don't like messy deaths ... I'm more interested in peaceful people who die in their own beds and no one knows why." With her expert knowledge, Christie had no need of poisons unknown to science, which were forbidden under Ronald Knox's "Ten Rules for Detective Fiction". Arsenic, aconite, strychnine, digitalis, nicotine, thallium, and other substances were used to dispatch victims in the ensuing decades.

=== Archaeology ===
The lure of the past came up to grab me. To see a dagger slowly appearing, with its gold glint, through the sand was romantic. The carefulness of lifting pots and objects from the soil filled me with a longing to be an archaeologist myself.

— Agatha Christie

In her youth, Christie showed little interest in antiquities. After her marriage to Mallowan in 1930, she accompanied him on annual expeditions, spending three to four months at a time in Syria and Iraq at excavation sites at Ur, Nineveh, Tell Arpachiyah, Chagar Bazar, Tell Brak, and Nimrud. The Mallowans also took side trips while travelling to and from expedition sites, visiting Italy, Greece, Egypt, Iran, and the Soviet Union, among other places. Their experiences travelling and living abroad are reflected in novels such as Murder on the Orient Express, Death on the Nile, and Appointment with Death.

For the 1931 digging season at Nineveh, Christie bought a writing table to continue her own work; in the early 1950s, she paid to add a small writing room to the team's house at Nimrud. She also devoted time and effort each season in "making herself useful by photographing, cleaning, and recording finds; and restoring ceramics, which she especially enjoyed." She also provided funds for the expeditions.

Many of the settings for Christie's books were inspired by her archaeological fieldwork in the Middle East; this is reflected in the detail with which she describes them – for instance, the temple of Abu Simbel as depicted in Death on the Nile – while the settings for They Came to Baghdad were places she and Mallowan had recently stayed. Similarly, she drew upon her knowledge of daily life on a dig throughout Murder in Mesopotamia. Archaeologists and experts in Middle Eastern cultures and artefacts featured in her works include Dr Eric Leidner in Murder in Mesopotamia and Signor Richetti in Death on the Nile.

After the Second World War, Christie chronicled her time in Syria in Come, Tell Me How You Live, which she described as "small beer – a very little book, full of everyday doings and happenings". From 8 November 2001 to March 2002, The British Museum presented a "colourful and episodic exhibition" called Agatha Christie and Archaeology: Mystery in Mesopotamia which illustrated how her activities as a writer and as the wife of an archaeologist intertwined.

== In popular culture ==
Some of Christie's fictional portrayals have explored and offered accounts of her disappearance in 1926. The film Agatha (1979), with Vanessa Redgrave, has Christie sneaking away to plan revenge against her husband; Christie's heirs sued unsuccessfully to prevent the film's distribution. The Doctor Who episode "The Unicorn and the Wasp" (17 May 2008) stars Fenella Woolgar as Christie, and explains her disappearance as being connected to aliens. The film Agatha and the Truth of Murder (2018) sends her undercover to solve the murder of Florence Nightingale's goddaughter, Florence Nightingale Shore. A fictionalised account of Christie's disappearance is also the central theme of a Korean musical, Agatha. The Christie Affair, a Christie-like mystery story of love and revenge by author Nina de Gramont, was a 2022 novel loosely based on Christie's disappearance.

Other portrayals, such as the Hungarian film Kojak Budapesten (1980), create their own scenarios involving Christie's criminal skills. In the TV play Murder by the Book (1986), Christie (Dame Peggy Ashcroft) murders one of her fictional-turned-real characters, Poirot. Christie features as a character in Gaylord Larsen's Dorothy and Agatha and The London Blitz Murders by Max Allan Collins. The American television program Unsolved Mysteries devoted a segment to her famous disappearance, with Agatha portrayed by actress Tessa Pritchard. A young Agatha is depicted in the Spanish historical television series Gran Hotel (2011) in which she finds inspiration to write her new novel while aiding local detectives. In the alternative history television film Agatha and the Curse of Ishtar (2018), Christie becomes involved in a murder case at an archaeological dig in Iraq. In 2019, Honeysuckle Weeks portrayed Christie in "No Friends Like Old Friends" (16 September 2019), episode 1 of season 3 of the Canadian television period detective series Frankie Drake Mysteries when Christie helps visiting private detective Frankie Drake solve the disappearance and poisoning of an old friend.

In 2020, Heather Terrell, under the pseudonym of Marie Benedict, published The Mystery of Mrs. Christie, a fictional reconstruction of Christie's December 1926 disappearance. The novel was on the USA Today and The New York Times Best Seller lists. In December 2020, Library Reads named Terrell a Hall of Fame author for the book. Andrew Wilson has written four novels featuring Agatha Christie as a detective: A Talent For Murder (2017), A Different Kind of Evil (2018), Death In A Desert Land (2019) and I Saw Him Die (2020). Starting in 2021, Colleen Gleason wrote the Phyllida Bright Mysteries historical amateur sleuth series under the pen name "Colleen Cambridge"; the titular sleuth of the stories is the leading housekeeper of Christie's staff, while Christie makes continued appearances in the series. Christie was portrayed by Shirley Henderson in the 2022 comedy/mystery film See How They Run. In 2024, Mithu Sanyal published the postcolonial-theory-cum-time-travel-novel Antichristie (in German); part of the plot revolves around a film script seminar aiming at producing a sanitized version of the Hercule Poirot mysteries.

== See also ==
- Agatha Christie indult – an oecumenical request to which Christie was signatory seeking permission for the occasional use of the Tridentine (Latin) mass in England and Wales
- Agatha Awards – literary awards for mystery and crime writers
- Agatha Christie Award (Japan) – literary award for unpublished mystery novels
- List of solved missing person cases (pre-1950)
