= Absent in the Spring =

Novel by Agatha Christie

- First American edition
- Author: Mary Westmacott (pseudonym of Agatha Christie)
- Cover artist: Not known
- Language: English
- Genre: Tragedy
- Publisher: Collins (UK); Farrar & Rinehart (US)
- Publication date: August 1944
- Publication place: United Kingdom
- Media type: Print (hardback & paperback)
- Pages: 160 pp.
- Preceded by: Towards Zero
- Followed by: Death Comes as the End

Absent in the Spring is a novel written by Agatha Christie and first published in the United Kingdom by Collins in August 1944 and in the United States by Farrar & Rinehart later in the same year. It was the third of six novels Christie wrote under the pen name Mary Westmacott.

== Explanation of the novel's title ==
The title is a quotation from William Shakespeare's sonnet 98: "From you have I been absent in the spring,..."

== Plot ==
Joan Scudamore, a middle-aged English wife and the mother of three adult children, is returning from a visit to her sick married daughter in Baghdad. Stranded between trains for several days at a tiny railway station in the desert in northern Iraq, with no one to talk to and nothing to read or do, she finds herself reflecting upon her life and her family, and finally facing some uncomfortable truths about herself and her life.

== Literary significance and reception ==
The Times Literary Supplement's review of 19 August 1944 by Marjorie Grant Cook stated positively, "The writer has succeeded in making this novel told in retrospect, with its many technical difficulties, very readable indeed. She has not made Joan, with her shallow, scrappy mind, sympathetic, and the other characters in the tale, seen through her eyes, lack the charm they had for each other and withheld from her."

J. D. Beresford's review in The Guardian of 25 August 1944 concluded, "It is a very clever and consistently interesting study of a character that not even a desert vision could permanently change."

Agatha Christie herself later called it, of all her books, "the one book that has satisfied me completely".

== Publication history ==
- 1944, William Collins & Sons (London), August 1944, Hardcover, 160 pp.
- 1944, Farrar & Rinehart (New York), 1944, Hardcover, 250 pp.
- 1967, Dell Books, Paperback, 192 pp
- 1971, Arbor House, Hardback, 250 pp.
- 1974, Fontana Books (Imprint of HarperCollins), Paperback, 192 pp.
- 1978, Ulverscroft Large-print Edition, Hardcover, 300 pp.; ISBN 0-7089-0115-8

The novel was first serialised in the United States in Good Housekeeping in two abridged instalments from July to August 1944.
