= A Daughter's a Daughter =

1952 novel by Agatha Christie

- Dust-jacket illustration of the first UK edition
- Author: Mary Westmacott (pseudonym of Agatha Christie)
- Language: English
- Genre: Tragedy
- Published: 1952 (Heinemann)
- Publication place: United Kingdom
- Media type: Print (hardback & paperback)
- Pages: 200 pp
- Preceded by: They Do It with Mirrors
- Followed by: After the Funeral

A Daughter's a Daughter is a novel written by Agatha Christie and first published in the UK by Heinemann on 24 November 1952. Initially unpublished in the US, it was later issued as a paperback by Dell Publishing in September 1963. It was the fifth of six novels Christie wrote under the nom-de-plume Mary Westmacott. Initially a play written by Christie in the late 1930s, the plot tells of a daughter's opposition to her mother's plan to remarry.

== Production ==
Christie tried to interest Peter Saunders, later the producer of The Mousetrap, in the play in 1950. He suggested amendments to update some of the references, which were now twenty years old, and tried the play out at the Theatre Royal, Bath where it opened on 9 July 1956 and ran for one week and eight performances. It was billed under the Westmacott name, but Westmacott's true identity had been public knowledge since 1949, and the publicity surrounding a new Agatha Christie play resulted in good attendance figures. Saunders however felt it would not survive in the West End and Christie didn't pursue the matter further.

== Copyright status ==
Following Christie's death, the copyright for the play was owned by her daughter, Rosalind Hicks, who was unenthusiastic about the play as it was believed that the main character was based on herself. Following Hicks' death in 2004, a new production of the play, starring Jenny Seagrove and Honeysuckle Weeks and produced by Bill Kenwright, was to open in London's West End on 14 December 2009. Kenwright described the play as "brutal and incredibly honest" and "It's a good enough play to stand up without the Christie brand. It's quite a tough play. It is a substantial night at the theatre."

== Publication history ==
- 1952, Heinemann (London), 24 November 1952, Hardback, 200 pp
- 1963, Dell Books (New York), September 1963, Paperback, 191 pp
- 1972, Arbor House (New York), Hardback, 191 pp
- 1978, Ulverscroft Large-print Edition, Hardcover, 334 pp ISBN 0-7089-0217-0
- 1986, Fontana Books (Imprint of HarperCollins), Paperback
