= Ashfield, Torquay =

Agatha Christie's childhood home

Coordinates: 50°28′29″N 3°32′33″W

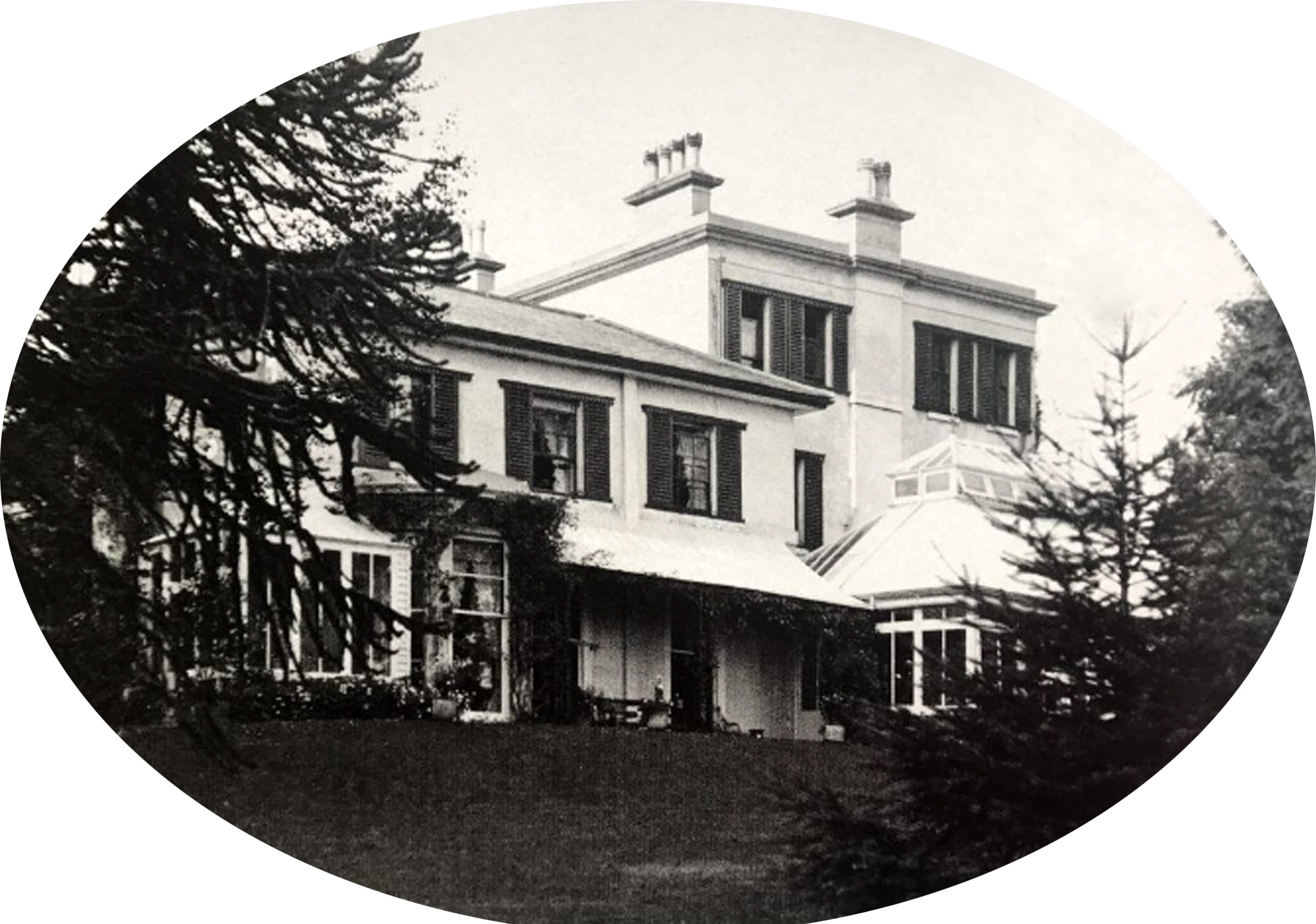
Ashfield in about 1900. This view is the back of the house. The Conservatory is on the extreme right and is labelled in the Ordnance map below

Ashfield in Torquay, Devon was the childhood home of Agatha Christie. She lived there from her birth until the time of her marriage, and intermittently thereafter. She reluctantly sold it in 1940; in 1962 it was demolished and replaced with a small estate of houses. A blue plaque marks the top left corner of the two-acre property which was Ashfield. Christie loved this house, and even in old age remembered it fondly. In her autobiography, she stated:

I remember, I remember the house where I was born. I go back to that always in my mind. Ashfield. How much that means. When I dream I hardly ever dream of Greenway or Winterbrook. It is always Ashfield, the old familiar setting where one’s life first functioned… How well I know every detail there: the frayed red curtain leading to the kitchen, the sunflower brass fender in the hall grate, the Turkey carpet on the stairs, the big shabby schoolroom with its dark blue and gold embossed wallpaper.

== Ashfield and the Miller family ==
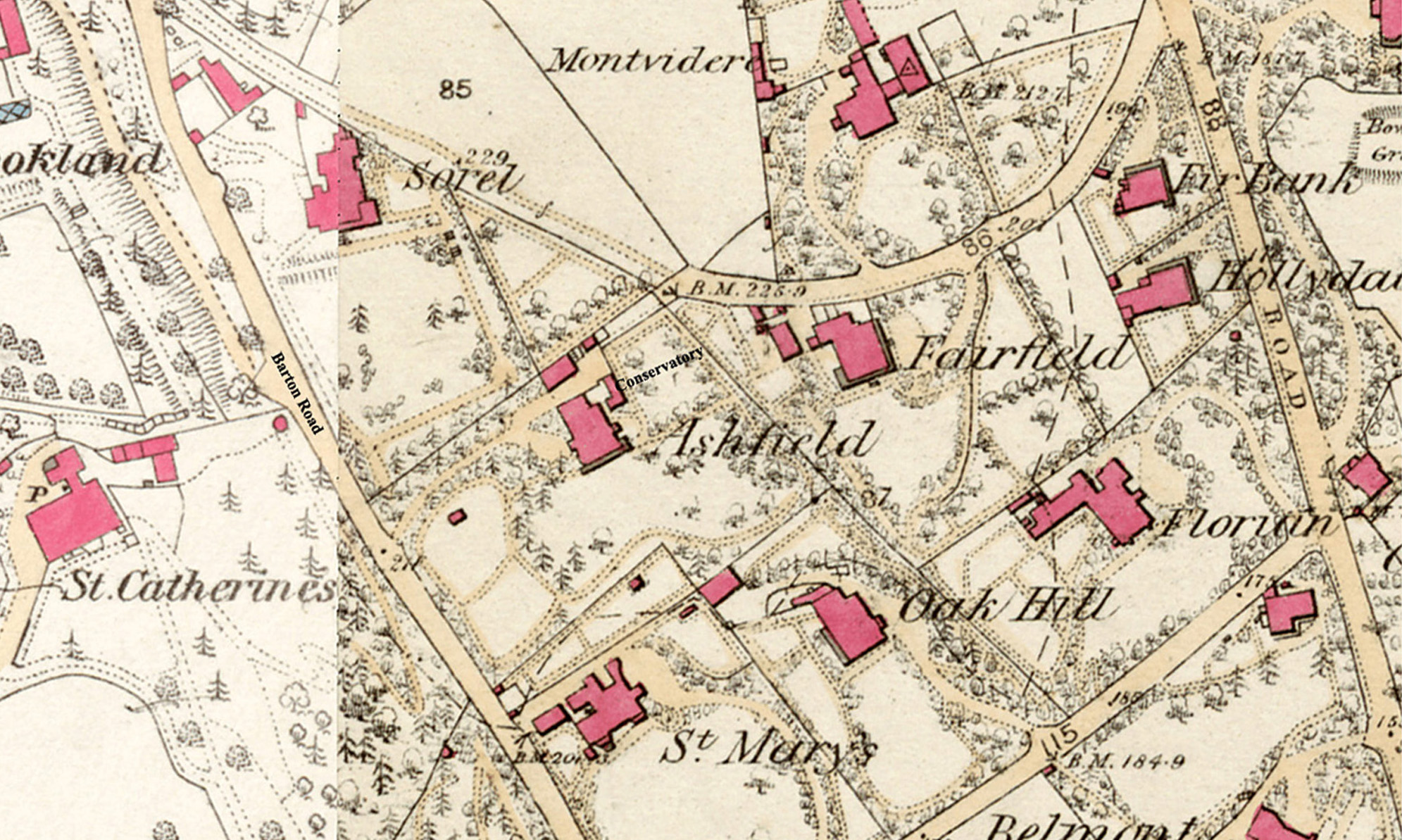
1880 Ordnance Map of Devon showing Ashfield (centre)

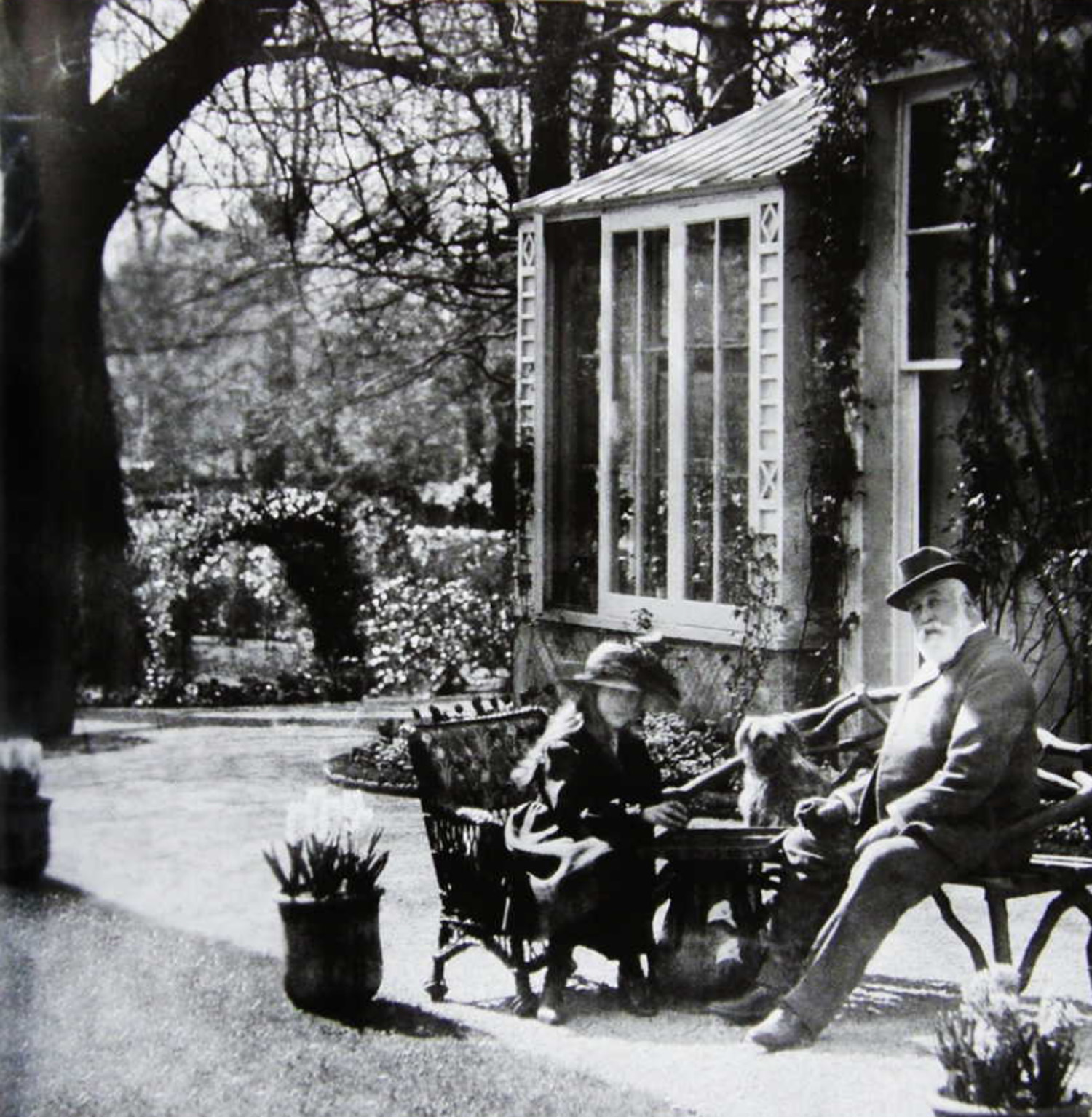
Agatha Christie and her father outside the greenhouse

The Ordnance map to the right shows Ashfield surrounded by similar villa houses, each in their own one- or two-acre gardens. Ashfield was a large early Victorian house whose entrance carriage drive ran from Barton Road not far from the Blue Plaque. It wound through the front garden up to the house. The photo of the house above is from the back, showing the external glass conservatory on the right. This conservatory is marked on the map.

The greenhouse, which Agatha said "adjoined the house on one side", was called K. K. The garden in the background in the photograph to the left is the main garden and stretches south-east toward the neighbouring property of “St Marys”.

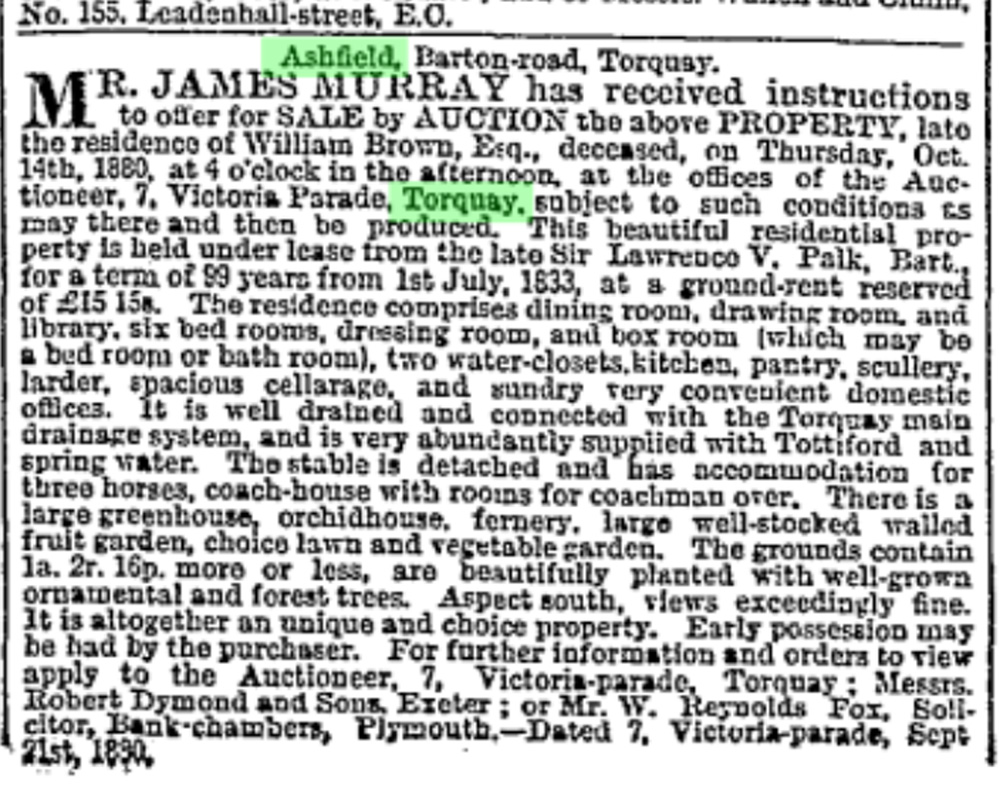
Mrs Brown's advertisement for the sale of Ashfield in 1880

Agatha's parents were Clarissa Boehmer and Frederick Alvah Miller. He was an American, born and raised in New York. Frederick's father Nathaniel had amassed a fortune through a partnership in a milling firm. Nathaniel came to England and married Clara's aunt. When he died in 1869 he left the bulk of his fortune in a complicated series of trusts to Frederick, his only child, but he also left Clara a small sum. Because of this inheritance, Frederick did not need to earn a livelihood, and so involved himself in many social pursuits; he was generally regarded as "a gentleman".

In 1878 Frederick married Clara; a year later their first child, Margaret "Madge" Frary Miller, arrived, and in 1880 their only son, Louis Montant "Monty" Miller, was born. Frederick needed to return to America for a short time, so he asked Clarissa to look for a house. She bought Ashfield with some of her inheritance from Nathaniel Miller. Agatha records her mother's recollections of this event in her autobiography:

My mother, whom we always claimed was clairvoyant replied that they could always sell it again. Perhaps she saw dimly her family living in that house for many years ahead. I loved that house as soon as I got into it, she insisted. "It's got a wonderfully peaceful atmosphere."

The house was owned by some people named Brown who were Quakers, and when my mother hesitatingly condoled with Mrs Brown on having to leave the house they had lived in so many years the lady said gently, "I am happy to think of thee and thy children living here, my dear." It was, my mother said, "like a blessing".

The advertisement for Ashfield was placed on Mrs Brown’s behalf, in The Times newspaper in 1880 is shown. It describes the many rooms of the house and gives an outline of the garden with its beautiful ornamental and forest trees with fine views. The property is noted as being abundantly supplied with ‘Tottiford and spring water’. Tottiford Reservoir had opened in 1861 originally built to supply solely Torquay with fresh drinking water.

== Christie at Ashfield ==
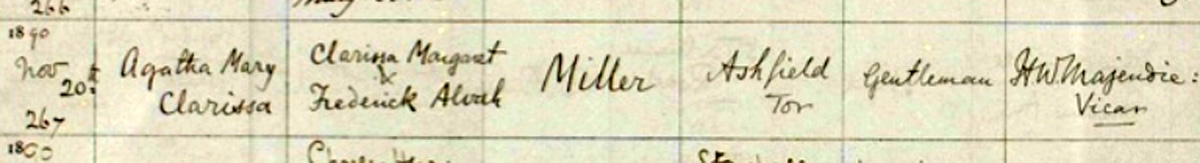
Christie's baptismal certificate

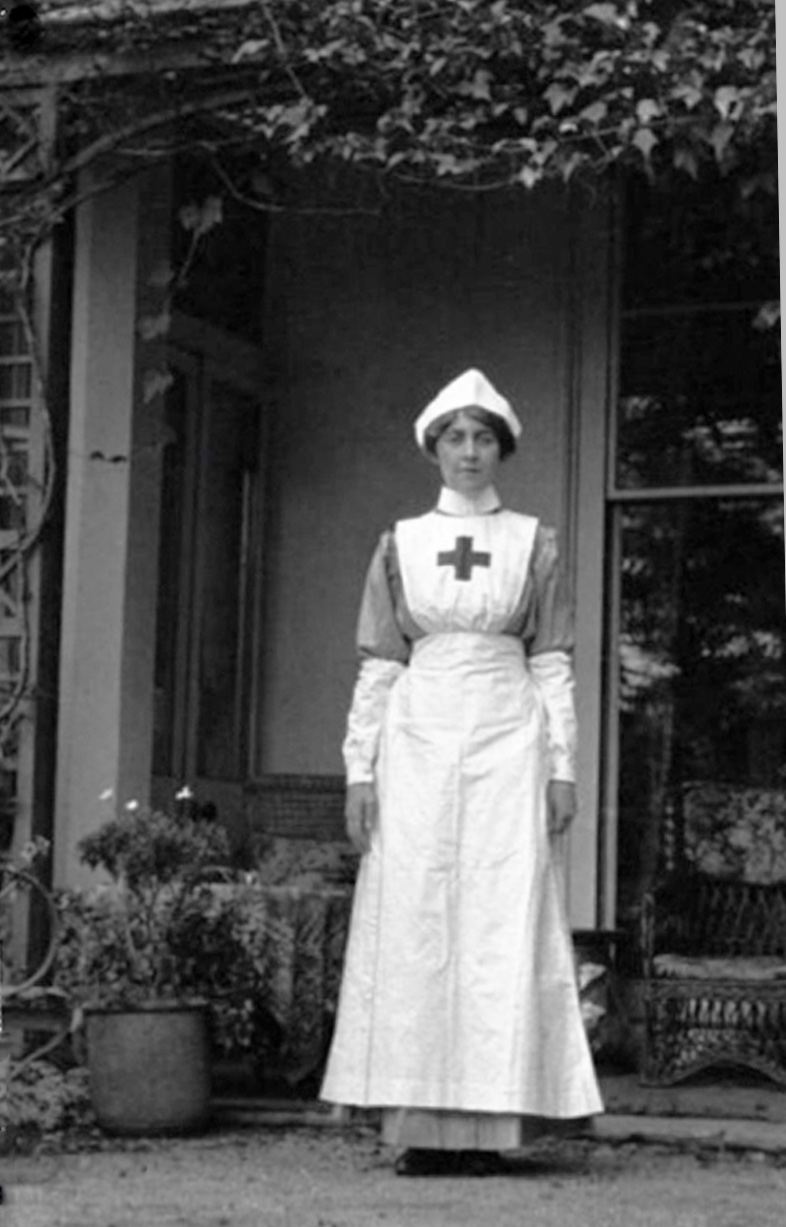
Agatha Christie in front of the verandah at the back of Ashfield

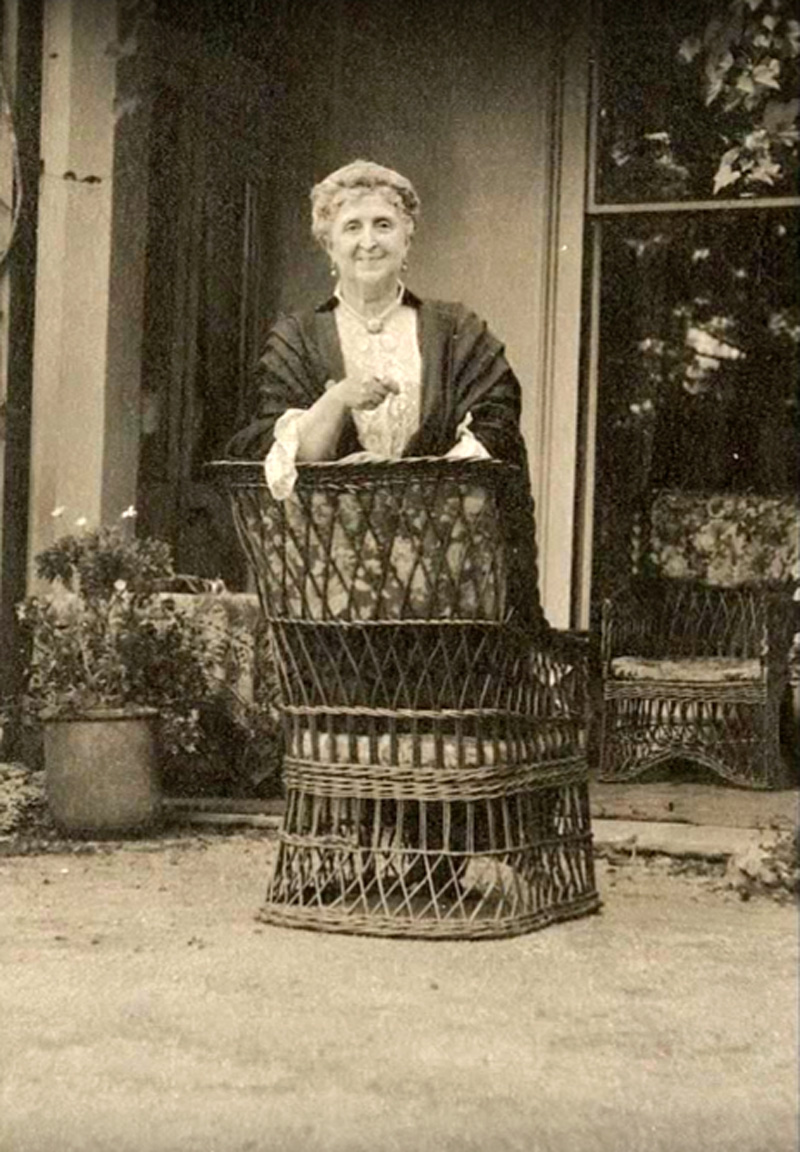
Clarissa Miller in front of the verandah at the back of the house

Agatha Christie was born at Ashfield in 1890. Her baptismal certificate (which is shown on the right) records that she was living here with her parents Frederick and Clara. The vicar who performed the ceremony was Rev Henry William Majendie, who was rector of All Saints Church, Torre, until 1900. He was also known for erecting the church that Frederick Miller helped construct by giving a generous donation in his infant daughter's name. The baptismal font that he used to christen Agatha is in the present All Saints Church.

In her autobiography, she gave an account of her life at Ashfield and some descriptions of the house. The following include the relevant reports to enable a more detailed picture of the property to be formed. Her earliest memories were of the nursery and her nanny whom she called "Nursie". She said:

The outstanding figure in my life was Nursie. And round myself and Nursie was our own special world, The Nursery. I can see the wallpaper now – mauve irises climbing up the walls in an endless pattern. I used to lie in bed looking at it in the firelight or the subdued light of Nursie’s oil lamp on the table."

She also remembered from an early age their cook Jane, who remained with the family for forty years. Jane Rowe is shown in the census form below as the cook living with the Millers in 1901. Agatha said:

One other person of importance in the house was Jane our cook, who ruled the kitchen with a calm superiority of a queen. She came to my mother when she was a slim girl of nineteen promoted from being a kitchen maid. Jane cooked five-course dinners for seven or eight people as a matter of daily routine. For grand dinner parties of twelve or more each contained alternatives – two soups, two fish courses etc".

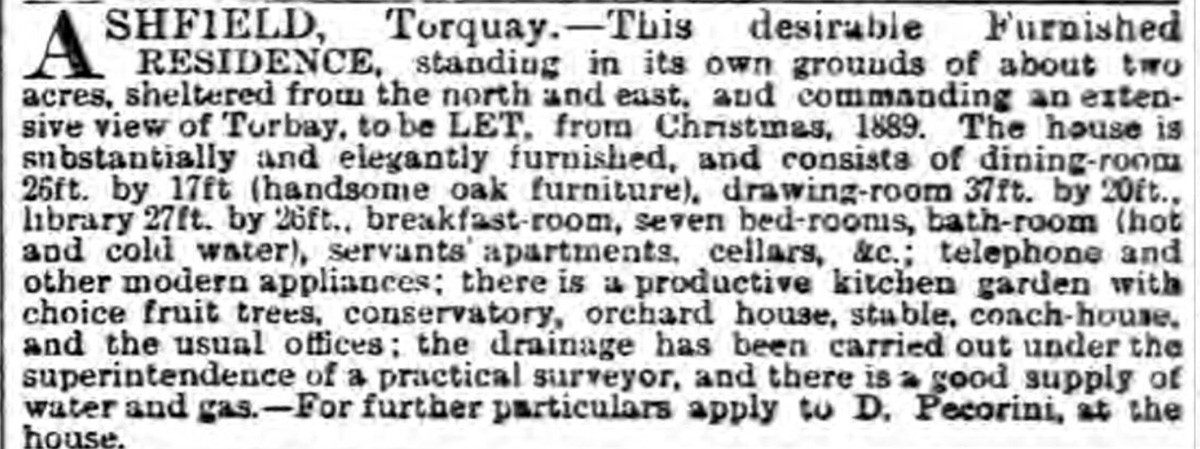
Rental notice by Frederick for Ashfield in 1890

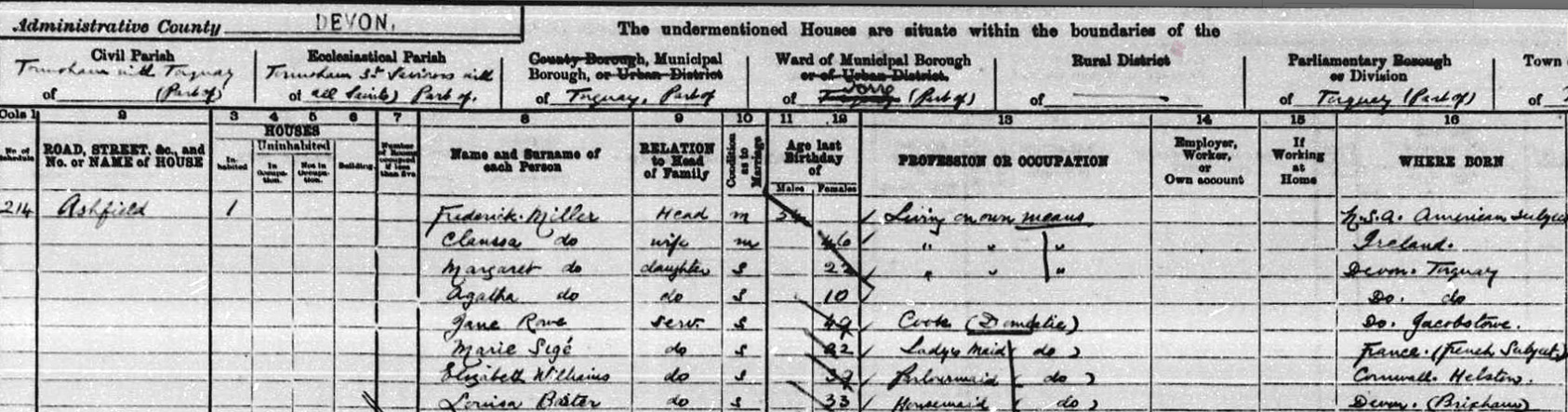
Census of 1901 for Ashfield

She described the external conservatory which can be seen in the photo of Ashfield above and in a close view below: "The conservatory, a grandiloquent erection, containing pots of begonias, geraniums, tiered stands of every kind of fern, and several large palm trees." These palm trees can be seen in the photo.

She also described the greenhouse called K. K.which can be seen in the above photo on the far left. She said it "adjoined the house on one side".

"This small greenhouse called I don’t know K. K. (or possibly Kai Kai?) was bereft of plants and housed instead croquet mallets, hoops, balls, broken garden chairs, old painted iron tables, a decayed tennis net and Matilde [a rocking horse]."

== Garden ==
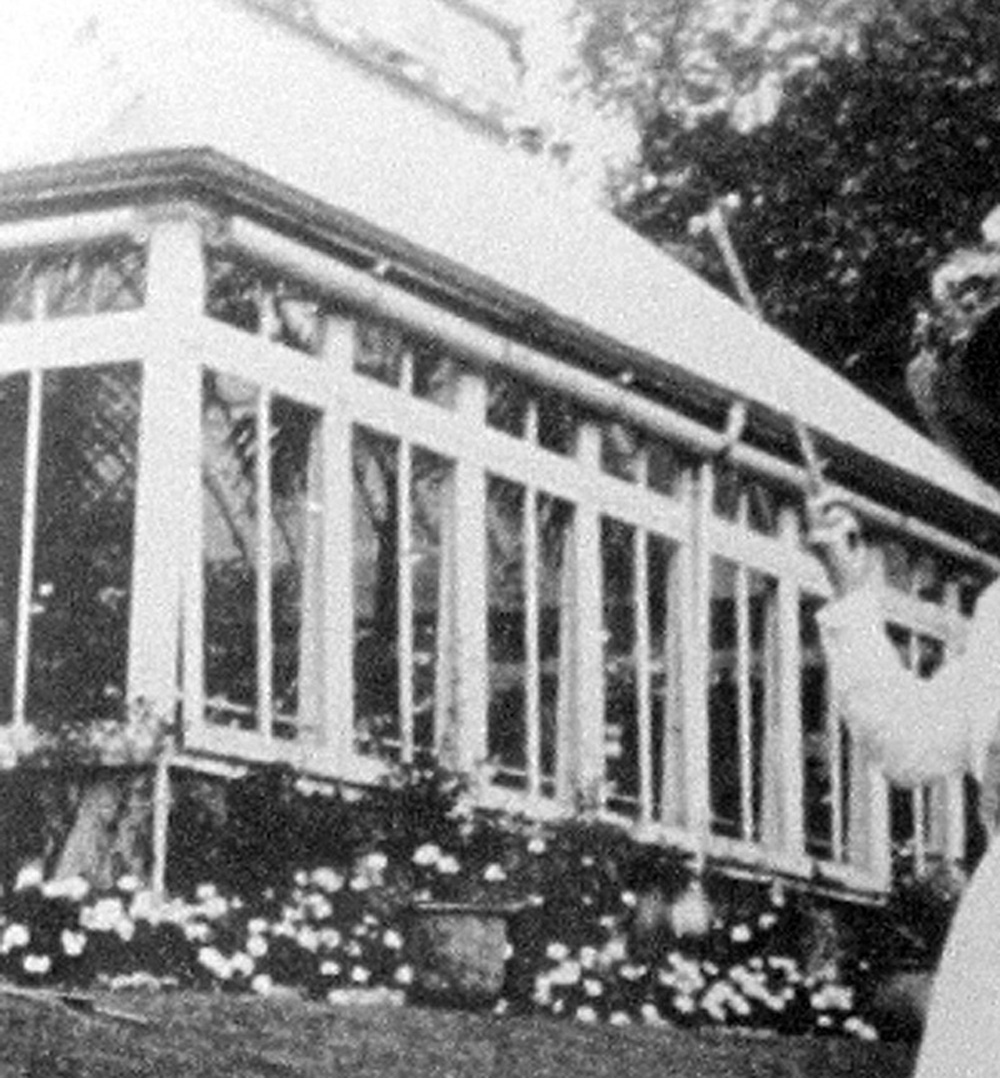
The Conservatory on the right of the back of the house showing the palm trees which were described by Agatha.

Agatha was particularly fond of the garden and described it in depth. Some of the features she outlines can be seen in the Ordnance map above.

"There was a kitchen garden, bounded by a high wall which abutted on the road. This was uninteresting to me except as a provider of raspberries and green apples, both of which I ate in large quantities.

Then came the garden proper – a stretch of lawn running downhill and studded with certain interesting entities. The ilex, the cedar, the Wellingtonia (excitingly tall). Two fir trees ….. the turpentine tree which exuded a sticky strong smelling gum which I collected carefully in leaves and which was very precious balm. Finally the crowning glory the beech tree – the biggest tree in the garden with a pleasant shedding of beechnuts which I ate with relish. There was a copper beech too but this for some reason never counted in my tree world.

Thirdly, there was the wood. In my imagination it looked and indeed still looms as large as the New Forest. Mainly composed of Ash trees it had a path winding through it. The wood had everything that is connected with woods. Mystery, terror, secret delight, inaccessibility and distance.

The path through the woods led out onto the tennis or croquet lawn at the top of a high bank in front of the dining room window."
