= Chimney (disambiguation) =

A chimney is a conduit for exhausting combustion gases up into open air.

Chimney or Chimneys may also refer to:

== Arts and entertainment ==
- Chimney (sculpture), outside Riley Hospital for Children, Indianapolis
- Chimneys (play) by Agatha Christie
- Chimneys novels, two light-hearted thrillers by Agatha Christie

== Biology ==
- Chimney swift (Chaetura pelagica)
- Chimney crayfish (Cambarus diogenes)
- Chimney bellflower (Campanula pyramidalis)

== Other ==
- Chimney (locomotive), specifically for chimneys fitted to railway locomotives
- Funnel (ship), chimney or smokestack on a ship
- Chimney, Oxfordshire, hamlet in England
- Fairy chimney, tall thin rock formation
- Methane chimney, underground gas buildup
- Solar chimney, method of heating a building using passive solar energy

== See also ==
- Chimney Corner (disambiguation)
- Chimney Peak (disambiguation)
- Chimney Rock (disambiguation)
- Chimneying, a rock-climbing technique
