= List of English words of Scottish Gaelic origin =

This is a list of English words borrowed from Scottish Gaelic. Some of these are common in Scottish English and Scots but less so in other varieties of English.

== Words of Scottish Gaelic origin ==
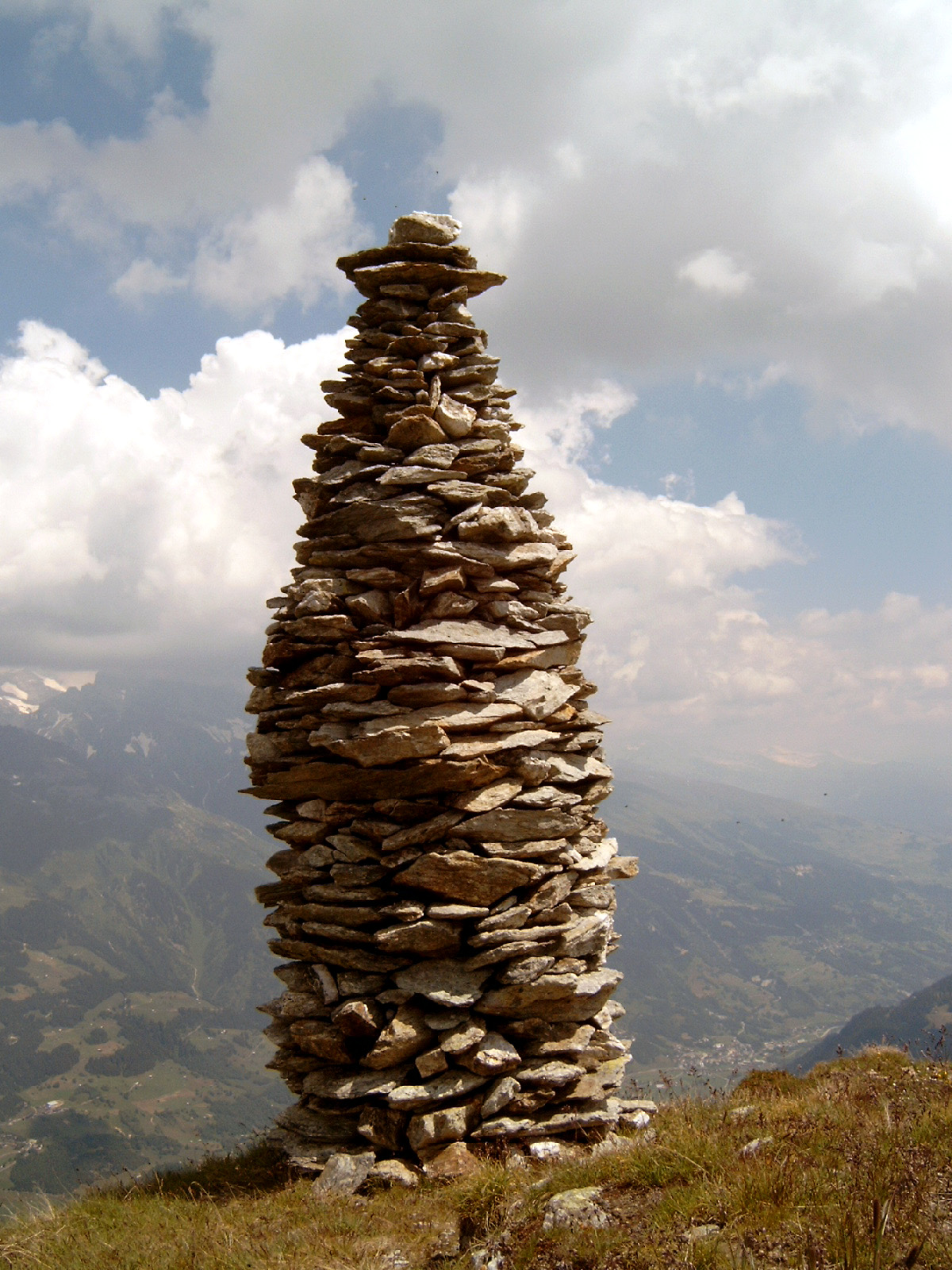
Cairn

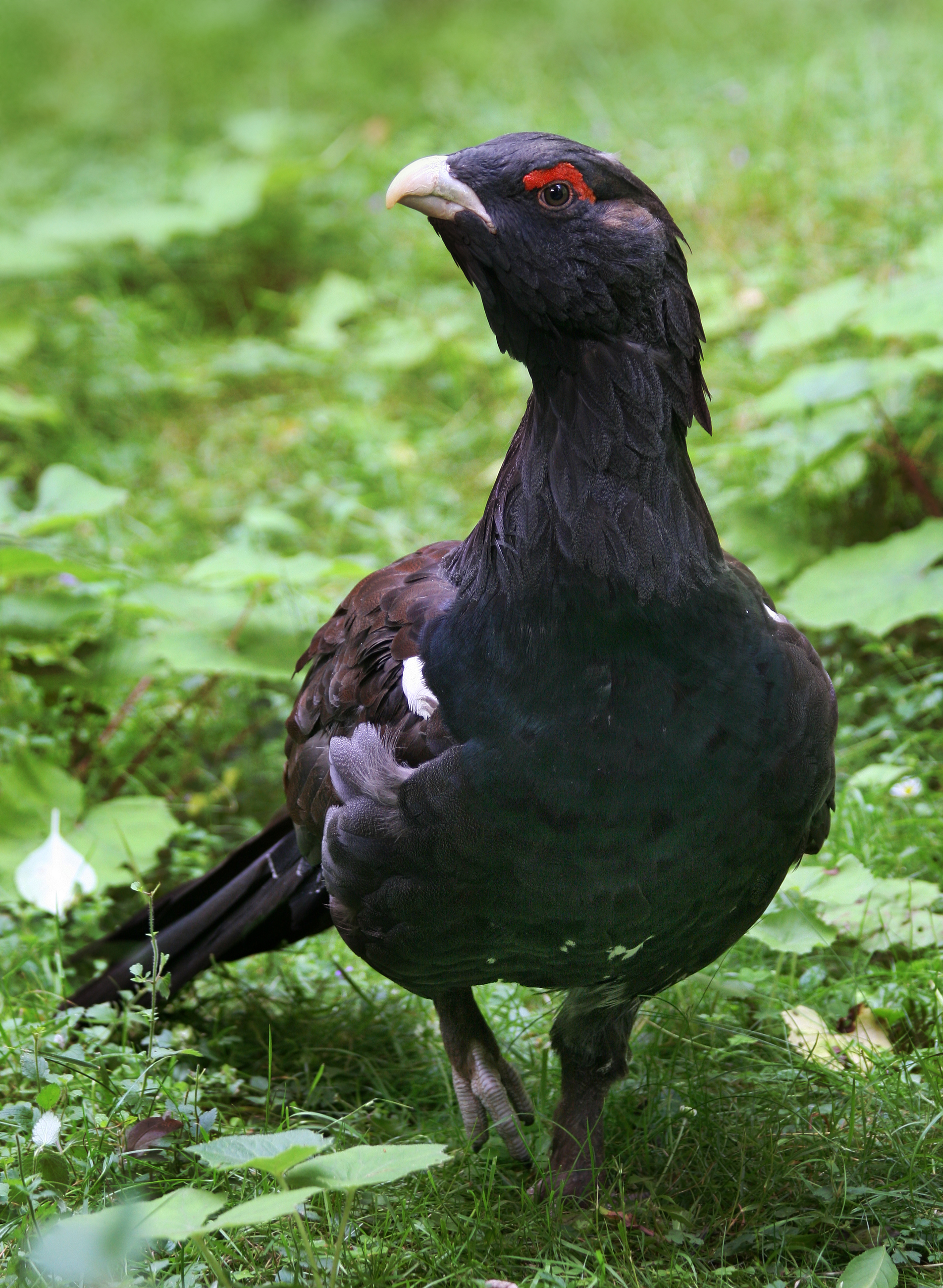
Capercaillie

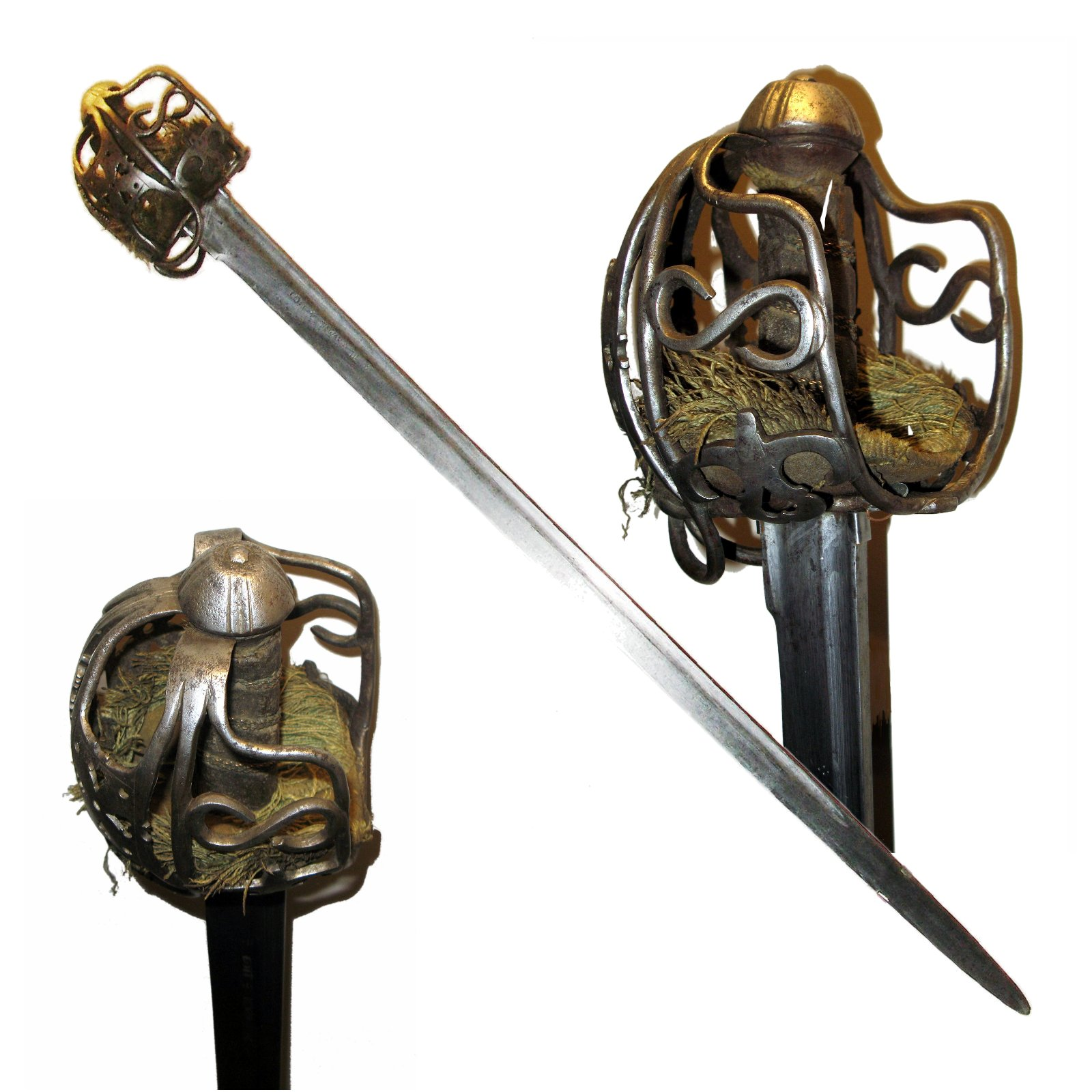
Claymore

Trousers

Bard
The word's earliest appearance in English is in 15th century Scotland with the meaning "vagabond minstrel". The modern literary meaning, which began in the 17th century, is heavily influenced by the presence of the word in ancient Greek (bardos) and ancient Latin (bardus) writings (e.g. used by the poet Lucan, 1st century AD), which in turn took the word from the Gaulish language.
Ben
From beinn [peiɲ], mountain.
Bodach
Old man.
Bog
From bog [pok], soft (related to boglach swamp), from Old Irish bocc. 14th century.
Bothan
A hut, often an illegal drinking den. (cf Bothy)
Caber toss
An athletic event, from the Gaelic word "cabar" which refers to a wooden pole.
Cailleach
An old woman, a hag, or a particular ancient goddess.
Cairn
From càrn. The word's meaning is much broader in Gaelic, and is also used for certain types of rocky mountains.
Caman
a shinty stick.
Capercaillie
From capall-coille [kʰaʰpəl̪ˠˈkʰɤʎə], meaning "horse of the woods"
Cèilidh
A 'social gathering' or, more recently, a formal evening of traditional Scottish Social Dancing.
Canntaireachd
oral notation for pipe music.
Clan
From the compound form clann pronounced [ˈkʰl̪ˠãũn̪ˠ], from clann, children or family. Old Irish cland.
Claymore
A large broadsword, from claidheamh mór [ˈkʰl̪ˠajəv ˈmoːɾ], great sword.
Coire
literally a "kettle", meaning a corrie, from the same root.
Crag
From creag [kʲʰɾʲek], a cliff.
Deoch an dorus (various spellings)
meaning a "drink at the door". Translated as "one for the road", i.e. "one more drink before you leave".
Fear an taighe
an MC (master of ceremonies), Gaelic lit. "the man of the house"
Eàrlaid
the right sometimes sold by an outgoing to an incoming tenant to enter into possession of the arable land early in Spring.
Galore
From gu leor, enough.
Gillie
a type of servant, now usually somebody in charge of fishing and rivers, and also ghillie suit used as a form of camouflage, from gille [ˈkʲiʎə], boy or servant.
Glen
From gleann [klaun̪ˠ], a valley.
Gob
From gob, beak or bill.
Kyle or Kyles
Straits from Gaelic Caol & Caolais.
Loch
From loch [l̪ˠɔx].
Lochaber axe
From Loch Abar [l̪ˠɔx ˈapəɾ], Lochaber + axe.
Mackintosh
After Charles Macintosh who invented it. From Mac an Tòisich [ˈmaʰk ən̪ˠ ˈt̪ʰɔːʃɪç], son of the chieftain.
Mod
A Gaelic festival, from mòd [mɔːt̪], assembly, court.
Pet
From peata, tame animal.
Pibroch
From pìobaireachd [ˈpʰiːpɛɾʲəxk], piping.
Pillion
From pillean [ˈpʰiʎan], pack-saddle, cushion.
Plaid
From plaide [ˈpʰl̪ˠatʲə], blanket. Alternatively a Lowland Scots loanword , from the past participle of ply, to fold, giving plied then plaid after the Scots pronunciation.
Ptarmigan
From tàrmachan [ˈt̪ʰaːɾməxan]. 16th Century.
Shindig
From sìnteag to skip, or jump around
Slogan
From sluagh-ghairm [ˈs̪l̪ˠuəɣɤɾʲɤm], battle-cry
Sporran
Via sporan [ˈs̪pɔɾan] from Old Irish sboran and ultimately Latin bursa, purse.
Spunk
From spong [s̪pɔŋk], tinder and also sponge. From Early Irish sponge, from Latin spongia, from Greek σπογγιά, a sponge.
Strontium
from Sròn an t-Sìthein [ˈs̪t̪ɾɔːn əɲ ˈtʲʰiːɛɲ] meaning "the point at the fairy hill", name of a village, near which the element was discovered.
Trousers
from triubhas [ˈt̪ʰɾu.əs̪], via "trews".
Whisky
Short form of whiskybae, from uisge-beatha [ɯʃkʲəˈpɛhə], water of life.

== Words of Scottish or Irish Gaelic origin ==
The following words are of Goidelic origin but it cannot be ascertained whether the source language was Old Irish or one of the modern Goidelic languages.

Brogue
An accent, Irish, or Scottish Gaelic bròg [pɾɔːk], shoe (of a particular kind worn by Irish and Gaelic peasants), Old Irish bróc, from Norse brókr
Hubbub
Irish, or Scottish Gaelic ubub [ˈupup], an exclamation of disapproval.
Shanty
Irish or Scottish Gaelic sean taigh [ʃɛn ˈtʰɤj], an old house
Smidgen
Irish or Scottish Gaelic smidean [ˈs̪mitʲan], a very small bit (connected to Irish smidirín, smithereen), from smid, syllable or a small bit.
Strath
Irish, or Scottish Gaelic srath [s̪t̪ɾah], a wide valley.

== Gaelic words mostly used in Lowland Scots ==
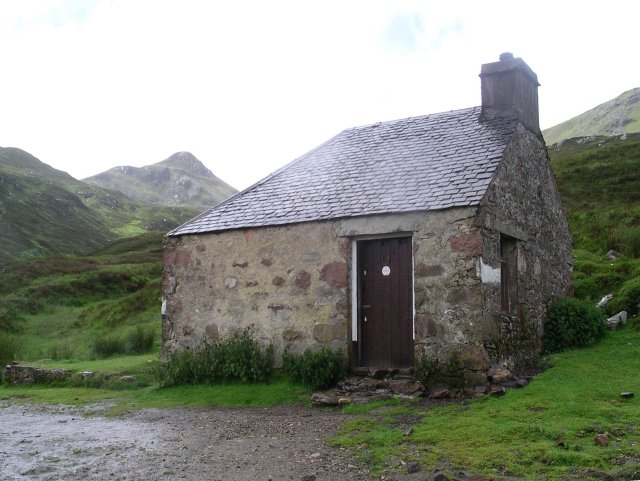
Bothy

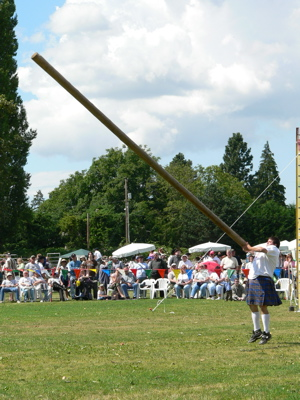
Caber

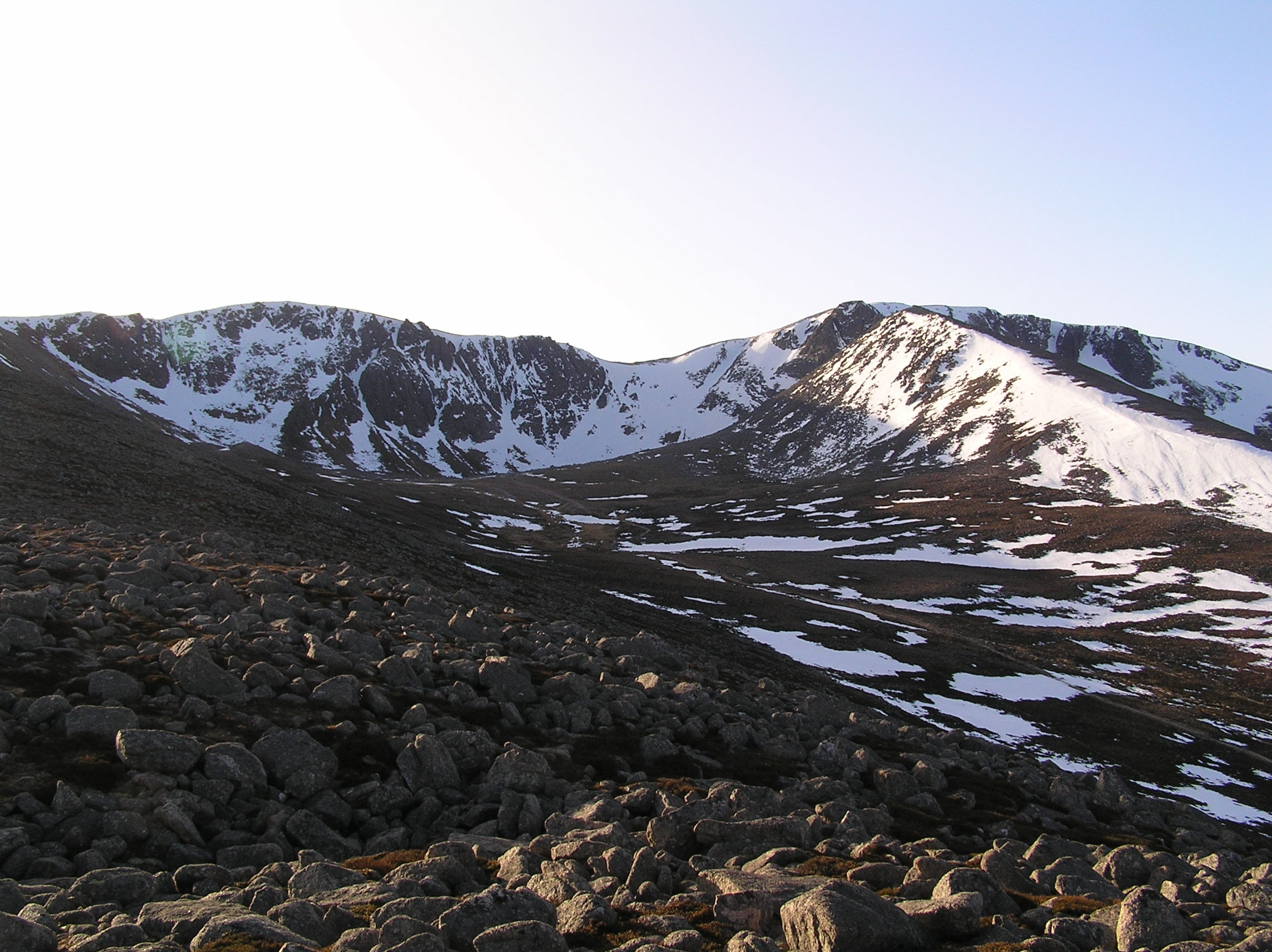
Corrie

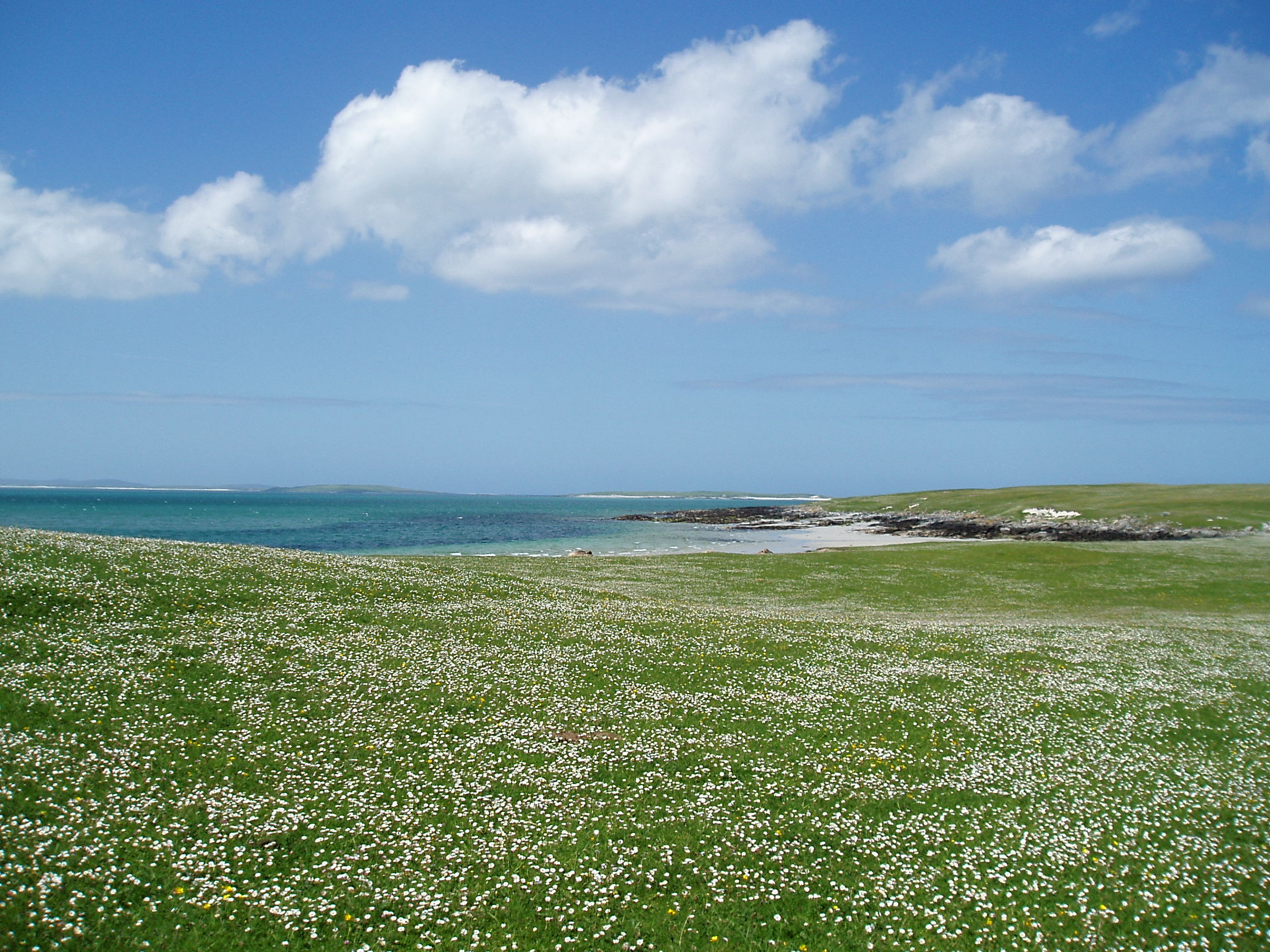
Machair

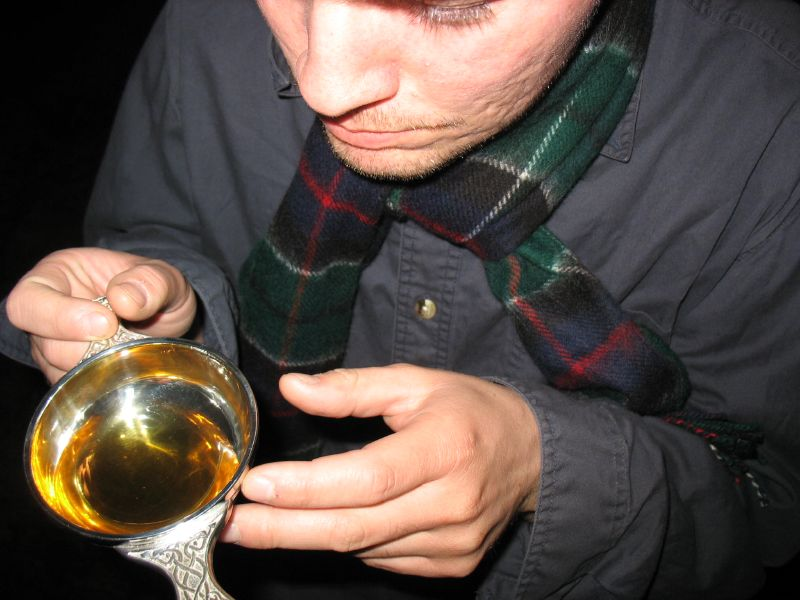
Quaich

Because of the wide overlap of Scottish English and Lowland Scots, it can be difficult to ascertain if a word should be considered Lowland Scots or Scottish English. These words tend to be more closely associated with Lowland Scots but can occur in Scottish English too.

Airt
Point of the compass, from àird [aːrˠtʲ], a point.
Bothy
A hut, from bothan [ˈpɔhan], a hut, cf. Norse būð, Eng. booth.
Caird
A tinker, from ceaird [kʲʰɛrˠtʲ], the plural of ceàrd, tinkers.
Caber
From cabar [ˈkʰapəɾ], pole.
Cailleach
From cailleach [ˈkʰaʎəx], old woman.
Caman
From caman [ˈkʰaman], shinty stick. Also in use in Scotland the derived camanachd, shinty.
Cateran
From ceatharn [ˈkʲʰɛhərˠn̪ˠ], fighting troop.
Ceilidh
From céilidh [ˈkʲʰeːlɪ], a social gathering.
Clachan
From clachan [ˈkʰl̪ˠaxan], a small settlement.
Clarsach
A harp, from clàrsach [ˈkʰl̪ˠaːrˠs̪əx], a harp.
Corrie
From coire [ˈkʰɤɾʲə], kettle.
Doch-an-doris
Stirrup cup, from deoch an dorais [ˈtʲɔx ən̪ˠ ˈt̪ɔɾɪʃ], drink of the door.
Fillibeg
A kilt, from féileadh beag [ˈfeːləɣ ˈpek], small kilt.
Ingle
From aingeal [ˈãĩŋʲkʲəl̪ˠ], a now obsolete word for fire.
Kyle
From caol [kʰɯːl̪ˠ], narrow.
Lochan
From lochan [ˈl̪ˠɔxan], a small loch.
Machair
From machair [ˈmaxɪɾʲ], the fertile land behind dunes.
Quaich
From cuach [kʰuəx], a cup.
Skean
From sgian [ˈs̪kʲiən], a knife.
Slughorn
Also from sluagh-ghairm, but erroneously believed by Thomas Chatterton and Robert Browning to refer (apparently) to some kind of trumpet.

Inch (in the sense of an island)
, from Scottish Gaelic innis [ĩːʃ].
Och
Irish and Scottish Gaelic och [ɔx], exclamation of regret. Cf. English agh, Dutch and German ach.
Oe
Grandchild, Irish and Scottish Gaelic ogha [ˈo.ə], grandchild.
Samhain
Irish and Scottish Gaelic Samhain [ˈs̪ãũ.ɪɲ], November and related to Oidhche Shamhna, Halloween.
Shennachie
Irish and Scottish Gaelic seanchaidh [ˈʃɛn̪ˠɛxɪ], storyteller.
Sassenach
Irish and Scottish Gaelic Sasannach [ˈs̪as̪ən̪ˠəx], An Englishman, a Saxon.

Abthen (or Abthan)
jurisdiction and territory of pre-Benedictine Scottish monastery, from †abdhaine [ˈapɣəɲə], abbacy.
Airie
shieling, from àiridh [ˈaːɾʲɪ], shieling.
Aiten
juniper, from aiteann [ˈaʰtʲən̪ˠ], juniper.
Bourach
A mess, from bùrach [ˈpuːɾəx], a mess.
Car, ker
Left-handed, from cearr [kʲʰaːrˠ], wrong, left.
Crine
To shrink, from crìon [kʰɾʲiən], to shrink.
Crottle
A type of lichen used as a dye, from crotal [ˈkʰɾɔʰt̪əl̪ˠ], lichen.
Golack
An insect, from gobhlag [ˈkoːl̪ˠak], an earwig.
Keelie
A tough urban male, from gille [ˈkʲiːʎə], a lad, a young man.
Ketach
The left hand, from ciotach [ˈkʲʰiʰt̪əx], left-handed.
Sonse
From sonas [ˈs̪ɔnəs̪], happiness, good fortune. Also the related sonsy.
Spleuchan
A pouch, from spliùchan [ˈs̪pluːxan], a pouch, purse.
Toshach
Head of a clan, from toiseach [ˈt̪ʰɔʃəx], beginning, front.

== Place-name terminology ==
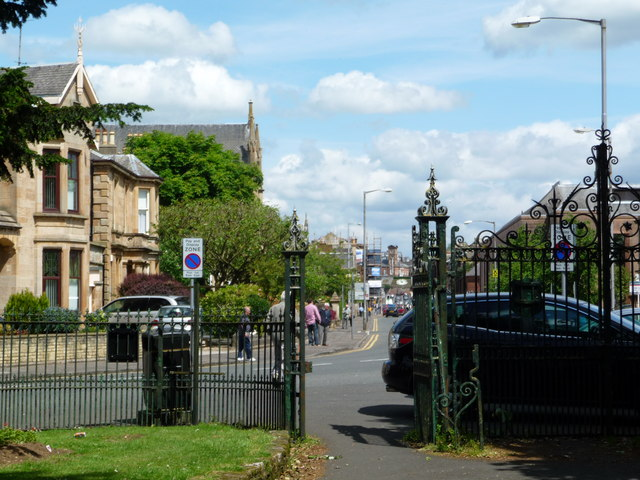
Kilmarnock

There are numerous additional place-name elements in Scotland which are derived from Gaelic, but the majority of these have not entered the English or Scots language as productive nouns and often remain opaque to the average Scot. A few examples of such elements are:

- a(u)ch- from Gaelic achadh, a field; hence Auchentoshan distillery, Auchinleck
- ard- from Gaelic àird, a height or promontory; hence Ardnamurchan, etc.
- bal- from Gaelic baile, a town; hence Balgowan, Balgay etc.
- cam- from Gaelic camas, a bend or meander; hence Cambuslang, Cambusnethan
- dal- from Gaelic dail, a meadow (not to be confused with "dale", from the Norse dalr meaning a valley); hence Dalry
- drum- from Gaelic druim, a ridge; hence Drumchapel, Drumnadrochit etc.
- dun- from Gaelic dun, a fort; hence Dundee, Dumbarton, Dunedin
- inver- from Gaelic inbhir, a river mouth or confluence; hence Inverclyde, Inverleith
- kil- from Gaelic cill, a churchyard; hence Kilmarnock, Kilbride etc.
- kin- from Gaelic ceann, a head; hence Kinlochleven, Kinloss etc.

== See also ==
- List of English words of Scots origin
- List of English words of Irish origin
- List of English words of Welsh origin
- Lists of English words of Celtic origin
- Lists of English words by country or language of origin
