= List of English words of Scottish origin =

List of English words of Scottish origin may refer to:

- List of English words of Scots origin (i.e. Lowland Scots (Lallans, Doric etc.))
- List of English words of Scottish Gaelic origin
