= Chimneys novels =

Novel series by Agatha Christie

The Chimneys novels were two light-hearted thrillers by Agatha Christie, The Secret of Chimneys (1925) and The Seven Dials Mystery (1929). Superintendent Battle and Lady "Bundle" Brent were characters in both books. Chimneys was a country house, the seat of the fictional Marquesses of Caterham, based on Abney Hall in Cheshire.

The Chimney Murder (1929) was an unrelated novel by E. M. Channon.
