= Chimney Rock =

Chimney Rock can refer to one of the following sites in the United States and Canada:

- Chimney Rock National Historic Site, a 325-foot geological formation in Nebraska, United States
- Chimney Rock, North Carolina, United States; a village
  - Chimney Rock State Park, a 315-foot granite monolith near Chimney Rock, North Carolina, United States
- Chimney Rock, Colorado, an unincorporated community in Archuleta County, Colorado, United States
  - Chimney Rock National Monument, a geological formation and archaeological site in Archuleta County, Colorado, United States
- Chimney Rock (Jackson Butte), a pillar in southwest Colorado, United States
- Chimney Rock (Colorado), a pillar in Ouray County, Colorado, United States
- Chimney Rock (Canada), a limestone monolith in Marble Canyon, British Columbia, Canada
- Chimney Rock (Capitol Reef National Park), a summit in Capitol Reef National Park in Utah, United States
- Chimney Rock (Washington), a peak in the Alpine Lakes Wilderness in Washington, United States
- Chimney Rock (Idaho), a monolith in the Selkirk Mountains in the Idaho "panhandle".
- Chimney Rock Scientific and Natural Area, a sandstone/limestone formation and protected area in Minnesota.
- Chimney Rock Winery in Napa Valley, California, United States
- Chimney Rock, next to and part of the Washington Valley Park in New Jersey, United States
- Chimney Rock, a peak in List of mountains in Mineral County, Montana, United States
- Chimney Rock, the name of five pillars in Montana, United States
- Chimney Rock (Lucerne Valley, California), a California Registered Historical Landmark in the Mojave Desert, United States
- Chimney Rock, an outcrop on the headlands of Point Reyes, California, United States
- Chimney Rock, a quartzite formation and scenic vista at Catoctin Mountain Park in northern Maryland, United States
- Chimney Rock, a rock formation near Ghost Ranch, New Mexico, United States
- Chimney Rock, a granite pillar located south of Lake Nacimiento, California, United States
- Chimney Rock, Wisconsin, a town
