= John Caird =

John Caird may refer to:

- John Caird (director) (born 1948), British stage director
- John Caird (theologian) (1820–1898), Scottish theologian

== See also ==
- Caird (surname)
