= Agatha Christie's Seven Dials =

2026 British TV series

- Release poster
- Genre: Mystery; Period drama
- Based on: The Seven Dials Mystery by Agatha Christie
- Written by: Chris Chibnall
- Directed by: Chris Sweeney
- Starring: Mia McKenna-Bruce; Edward Bluemel; Iain Glen; Martin Freeman; Helena Bonham Carter
- Composer: Anne Nikitin
- Country of origin: United Kingdom
- Original language: English
- No. of episodes: 3

Production
- Executive producers: Chris Chibnall; Suzanne Mackie; Chris Sussman; Andy Stebbing; Chris Sweeney; James Prichard
- Producers: Joanna Crow; Rebecca Roughan
- Cinematography: Luke Bryant
- Editor: Emma Oxley
- Running time: 52–56 minutes
- Production companies: Imaginary Friends; Agatha Christie Ltd; Orchid Pictures

Original release
- Network: Netflix
- Release: 15 January 2026

Agatha Christie's Seven Dials is a British miniseries based on the 1929 novel The Seven Dials Mystery by Agatha Christie. Dramatised by Chris Chibnall and directed by Chris Sweeney, the series stars Mia McKenna-Bruce, Edward Bluemel, Iain Glen, Martin Freeman, and Helena Bonham Carter. It premiered on Netflix on 15 January 2026.

== Cast ==
=== Main ===
- Mia McKenna-Bruce as Lady Eileen "Bundle" Brent
- Edward Bluemel as Jimmy Thesiger
- Iain Glen as Lord Caterham
- Martin Freeman as Superintendent Battle
- Helena Bonham Carter as Lady Caterham

=== Supporting ===
- Hughie O'Donnell as Bill Eversleigh
- Nyasha Hatendi as Dr Cyril Matip
- Alex Macqueen as George Lomax
- Nabhaan Rizwan as Ronny Devereux
- Corey Mylchreest as Gerry Wade
- Dorothy Atkinson as Maria, Lady Coote
- Mark Lewis Jones as Sir Oswald Coote
- Tim Preston as Rupert 'Pongo' Bateman
- Ella-Rae Smith as Loraine Wade
- Guy Siner as Tredwell
- Ella Bruccoleri as Socks
- Tristan Gemmill as Doctor Jackman
- Liz White as Emily
- Josef Davies as Alfred

== Episodes ==
No.	Title	Directed by	Written by	Original release date
1	"Bundle of Love"	Chris Sweeney	Chris Chibnall	15 January 2026
In 1920, Lord Caterham meets his death in Spain, gored by a bull at the Plaza de Toros de Ronda. Five years later, his widow Lady Caterham has rented out their country estate for a party hosted by the steel magnate Sir Oswald Coote, who hopes to secure a secret government contract. Lady Caterham's daughter, Lady Eileen "Bundle" Brent, makes romantic plans with Gerry Wade, her late brother's friend and one of several overnight guests from the Foreign Office, who intimates that he intends to propose to her. Gerry is known for sleeping late, and as a prank, his friends hide eight alarm clocks in his room. In the morning, he is found dead from an overdose of sleeping medication; seven of the clocks have been rearranged on the mantlepiece, and the eighth is later found on the lawn. Bundle refuses to believe that Gerry was suicidal, and discovers a letter written to his sister Loraine warning her about "the Seven Dials". Bundle investigates, enlisting the help of Gerry's colleague Ronny Devereux. She realises she is being followed, and receives an anonymous warning note. While out driving, she finds Ronny in the roadway; he has been shot. With his dying breath, he mentions his colleague Jimmy Thesiger and the Seven Dials.
2	"Battle Commences"	Chris Sweeney	Chris Chibnall	15 January 2026
In a flashback to 1920, it is revealed that Lord Caterham had been lured away to his death from an arranged meeting with an inventor, Dr Cyril Matip. An unknown woman attempts to steal Matip's formula from him, killing his sister in the process. In turn, Matip shoots the woman dead. Back in 1925, Bundle confronts the man following her, who turns out to be Superintendent Battle of Scotland Yard. He urges her to end her investigation but she ignores him, persuading Gerry's colleague Bill Eversleigh to take her to the Seven Dials, a seedy London nightclub. There, Bundle spies on a meeting of a mysterious secret society, disguised by clock masks. George Lomax, the Foreign Office Undersecretary, is to host a weekend gathering at which Matip will be invited to sell his invention to the British government. The details are secret, but Bundle flatters Lomax into disclosing that Matip has invented a revolutionary metal-strengthening formula. Bundle confides in Jimmy and Loraine, and Bundle and Jimmy inveigle invitations. Over dinner, Matip demonstrates that his formula has made a pocket watch bulletproof. That night, while Battle and his officers keep watch outside, and Bill and Jimmy keep watch inside, Bundle sneaks out and is caught by Battle. The house is woken by a commotion, and Jimmy is found unconscious and bleeding from a bullet wound in the arm.
3	"The Finger Points"	Chris Sweeney	Chris Chibnall	15 January 2026
Jimmy explains that he was shot by an intruder. Matip is discovered in bed, sedated with the same drug that had killed Gerry; his safe has been opened and the formula removed. Battle takes charge, and Bundle impresses him with her deductive skills. Loraine arrives unexpectedly and, after making an excuse to leave the living room, flees with Matip's formula and the watch. She boards a train, pursued by Bundle, Jimmy, and Bill. Cornered, she surrenders the watch and the formula to Bill. Jimmy, revealed to be working with Loraine, shoots Bill, who is saved by the watch. Bundle deduces that Jimmy had wounded himself, allowing Loraine time to drug Matip and steal the formula. Subduing Jimmy, Bundle confronts the true mastermind who is waiting in a carriage at the front of the train: her own mother. Believing that the British government was responsible for her son’s death during the First World War, Lady Caterham had enlisted Jimmy and Loraine in a scheme to profit from the formula. Loraine had poisoned Gerry, fearing he knew too much, while Jimmy had arranged the clocks as a distraction and had shot Ronny. The conspirators are arrested, and Bundle is taken before the Seven Dials Society. Unmasking himself as their leader, Battle invites Bundle to take her late father's place in the organisation, which works covertly for the public good. She enthusiastically accepts.

== Production ==
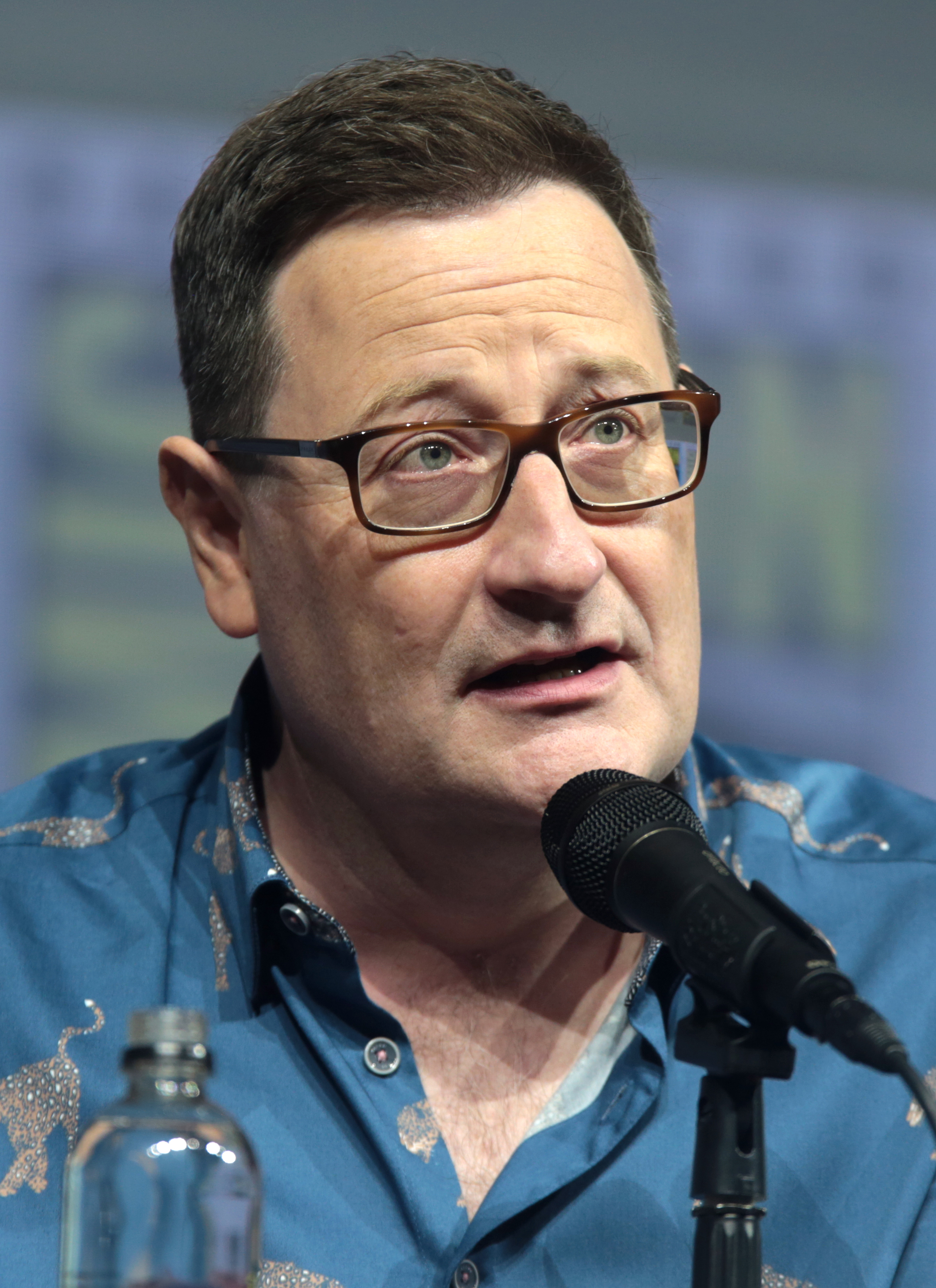
Chris Chibnall, creator and writer of the series

The series titled The Seven Dials Mystery was announced by Netflix in April 2024, along with the fact that it would serve as the debut production for Orchid Pictures, with Chris Chibnall as the creator and the writer of the show. In June, Mia McKenna-Bruce, Helena Bonham Carter and Martin Freeman were unveiled as the lead actors. Edward Bluemel joined the cast in July. In November 2025, the series was retitled Agatha Christie's Seven Dials.

Filming took place in the middle of 2024 in Bristol and Bath, with Badminton House standing in for The Chimneys, as well as Ronda, Spain.

== Release ==
The series premiered on Netflix on 15 January 2026.

== Reception ==
On the review aggregator website Rotten Tomatoes, 73% of 48 critics' reviews are positive. The website's consensus reads: "Though not the highest caliber of Agatha Christie adaptations, Seven Dials is a short and sweet dive into a mysterious rabbit hole that carries great performances and stylish verve." On Metacritic, the series has a weighted average score of 58 out of 100 based on 19 critics, indicating "mixed or average" reviews.
