= Sarah Crowden =

Scottish actress and writer

- Born: 8 May 1955 (age 71); Edinburgh, Scotland
- Years active: 1974–present
- Father: Graham Crowden

Sarah Crowden (born 8 May 1955) is a Scottish actress. She is best known for playing the role of Lady Manville in the British television series Downton Abbey, as well as Miss Thimble in the detective series Sister Boniface Mysteries.

== Early life and education ==
Crowden was born on 8 May 1955 in Edinburgh, the daughter of actor Graham Crowden (1922–2010) and actress Phyllida Hewat. She attended The Open University and holds a Bachelor of Arts degree as well as a diploma in Literature. In 2010, she was awarded a Foundation Certificate in Bricklaying.

== Career ==
Crowden started her acting career in 1974 when she joined The Actors' Company as a Student Assistant Stage Manager. One of her first notable roles was as Helen in the movie adaption of Agatha Christie's The Seven Dials Mystery (1981). She has played supporting roles in numerous television series and movies such as A Dance to the Music of Time, The Sarah Jane Adventures, Downtown Abbey and The Sister Boniface Mysteries. She received favourable reviews for her portrayal of Dame Hilda in the 2010 production of If So, Then Yes by N. F. Simpson with critic Michael Billington calling her performance as "a Thatcherite supervisor" shining and Dominic Maxwell of The Times praising her ability to "work wonders in restricted circumstances".

In 2017, Crowden started performing stand-up comedy on the London circuit as her self-created character Dame Theresa Thomson's-Gazelle.

Apart from her acting career, Crowden is also a professional writer. She has written pieces for The Lady, TLS, Geographical Review and Literary Review, amongst others, and regularly contributes to Slightly Foxed.

== Filmography ==
Year	Title	Role	Notes
1981	Agatha Christie's Seven Dials Mystery	Helen	movie
1983	The Fourth Arm	A.T.S. Sgt. Brookes	1 episode
1983	Pig in the Middle	Trish	1 episode
1984	Cockles	Miss Ida Findlesham	1 episode
1984	Swallows and Amazons Forever: Coot Club	Livy (Hullabaloo)	movie
1985	Billy the Kid and the Green Baize Vampire	uncredited	movie
1986	Harem	Charlotte	movie
1986	David Copperfield	Jane Murdstone	3 episode
1986	The Oldest Goose in the Business	Miss Debenham	movie
1987	Screen Two	Cub Mistress	movie
1987	A Dorothy L. Sayers Mystery	Hotel Receptionist	1 episode
1987	Father Matthew's Daughter	Ms. Wright	1 episode
1988	The Storyteller	Queen	1 episode
1988	The Rainbow	Catherine Phillips	1 episodes
1989	Mystery!: Campion	Sadie	1 episode
1989	Great Expectations (1989 TV series)	Miss Skiffkins	1 episode
1989	Erik the Viking	Grimhild Housewife	movie
1991	Poirot	Receptionist	1 episode
1991	Lovejoy	Rosemary Blake	1 episode
1992	Orlando	Queen Mary	movie
1992	ScreenPlay	Sarah	1 episode
1994	Smokescreen	Miss Chittock	1 episode
1995	Julia Jekyll and Harriet Hyde	Miss Print	1 episode
1996	Rab C. Nesbitt	Phoebe	1 episode
1996	The Detectives	Head Teacher	1 episode
1996	The Wind in the Willows	Samantha	movie
1997	A Dance to the Music of Time	Miss Orchard	1 episodes
1997	The Man Who Knew Too Little	Sylvia	movie
1998	Our Mutual Friend	First Guest	4 episodes
1998	Vanity Fair	Lady Blanche	3 episodes
1999	ChuckleVision	Mrs. Fiona Fortescue-Smythe	1 episode
2000	Brotherly Love	Morag Ranloch	1 episode
2001	Love in a Cold Climate	Third Twitterer	3 episodes
2002	Tipping the Velvet	Woman with Pipe	2 episodes
2003	My Hero	Mrs Clark	1 episode
2004	He knew He Was Right	Mrs. MacHugh	2 episodes
2004	Perfect Strangers	Angry Opera Lover	movie
2006	The Afternoon Play	Lady-in-Waiting	1 episode
2006	Longford	Lady Tree	movie
2006	Miss Potter	Lady Clilfford	movie
2007	The Sarah Jane Adventures	Mrs Gribbins	2 episodes
2007	Joe's Palace	Middle-aged woman	movie
2008	The Oxford Murders	Shop Assistant	movie
2008	Brideshead Revisited	Lady Guest	movie
2008	Affinity	Ada	movie
2009	The Green Green Grass	Antiques Expert	1 episode
2010	Upstairs Downstairs	Instructress	1 episode
2012	Quartet	Felicity Liddle	movie
2013	Endeavour	Miss Thornhill	1 episode
2013	Quartet: Deleted Scenes	Felicity Liddle	uncredited
2013	Doctors	Mrs. Hilary Warton	1 episode
2012–2014	Downton Abbey	Lady Manville	2 episodes
2014	The Riot Club	Elderly Woman	movie
2015	Cockroaches	The Old Crone	3 episodes
2015	Wolf Hall	Lady Exeter	2 episodes
2015	Jupiter Ascending	Bureaucrat	movie
2015	New Tricks	Flora Fox	1 episode
2015	Doc Martin	Mrs. Kelleher	1 episode
2015	Mr. Holmes	Mrs. Hudson	movie
2015	Queen of the Desert	Lady Ascot	movie, uncredited
2016	The Last Dragonslayer	Pritchett Lane House Owner	movie
2018	The Little Stranger	Miss Dabney	movie
2018	Peterloo	Lady at Races	movie
2019	The Durrells	Melanie Countess De Torro	2 episodes
2019	Grantchester	Mrs. Bennett	4 episodes
2021	Cruella	Beehive Lady	movie
2022–present	Sister Boniface Mysteries	Miss Thimble	12 episodes
2023	All the Light We Cannot See	Jacqueline / Madam Blanchard	2 episodes

== Stage ==
Year	Title	Role	Venue
2002	20,000 Leagues under the Sea	Lady Snide-Worthington	Stratford East Theatre
2005	Little Women	Aunt March	Duchess Theatre (West End)
2006	A Resounding Tinkle	Nora	Royal Court
2010	If So, Then Yes	Dame Hilda	Jermyn Street Theatre
2011	Flare Path	Mrs Oakes	Playful Productions / Theatre Royal Haymarket
2015	The Trial	Mrs Barrow	The Young Vic
2017	Bang Bang	The Countess	Mercury Theatre, Colchester
2018	Hilda & Virginia	Virginia Woolf and Hilda of Whitby	Jermyn Street Theatre
2018	The Chalk Garden	The Third Lady Applicant	Chichester Festival Theatre
2019	Handbagged	'T'	Salibsury Playhouse, York Royal & Oldham Coliseum
