= James Caird =

James Caird may refer to:

- Sir James Caird (politician) (1816–1892), Scottish writer and politician
- Sir James Caird, 1st Baronet, of Belmont Castle (1837–1916), Scottish jute baron and philanthropist who sponsored Ernest Shackleton's Endurance Expedition
- Sir James Caird, 1st Baronet, of Glenfarquhar (1864–1954), Scottish shipowner, founder of the National Maritime Museum, Greenwich
- James Caird (boat), a whaleboat named after the jute baron, used by Sir Ernest Shackleton

== See also ==
- Caird (surname)
