= Black cap =

English judges' cap

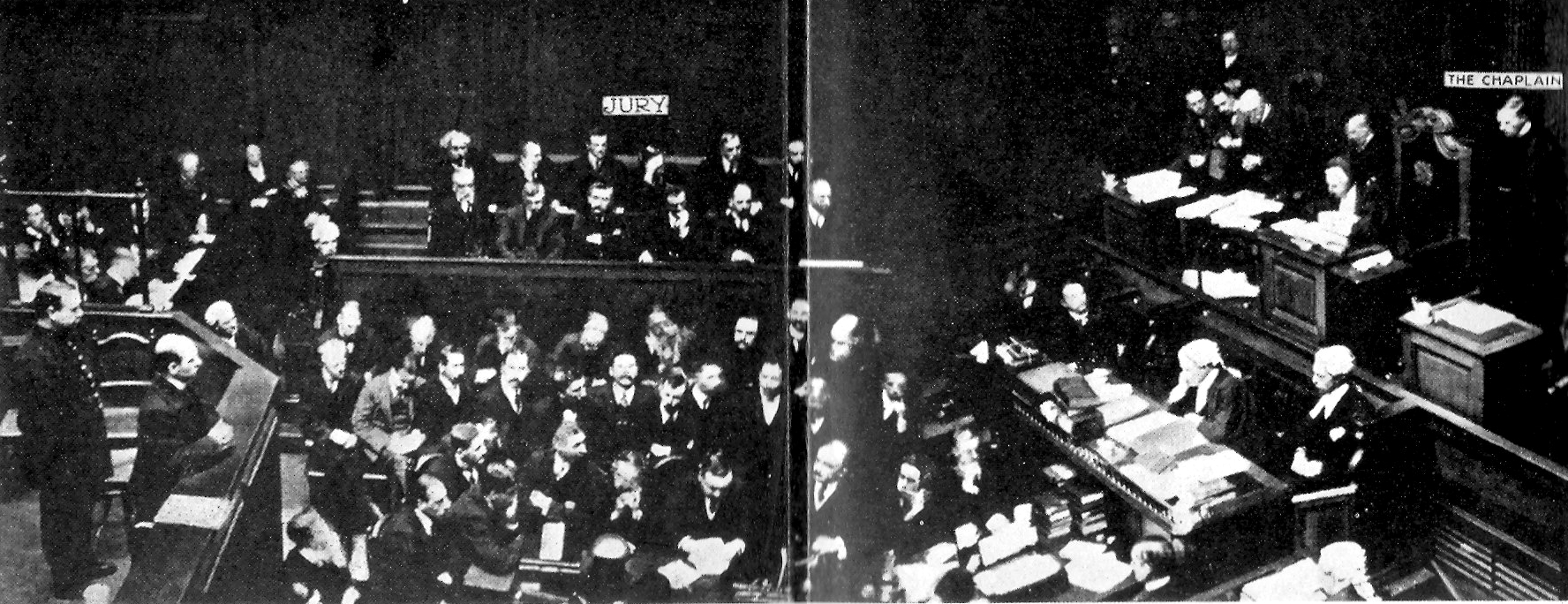
Passing the sentence on Frederick Seddon: Mr Justice Bucknill, wearing a black cap, passes a sentence of death on a convicted murderer (1912).

The black cap is a plain black fabric square formerly worn as symbolic headgear by English, Welsh, and Irish judges in criminal cases when passing a sentence of death. (Note: Scottish judges instead wore a black tricorne.) When worn, the square was placed on top of the judicial wig, with one of the four corners of the fabric facing forward. The cap is based on Tudor court styles. Originally, the cap was a normal part of judicial full dress, as worn by judges on all especially formal or solemn occasions, of which passing a death sentence was just one.

Although the death penalty has long been abolished in the United Kingdom, the black cap is still part of a judge's official regalia, and is carried into the High Court of Justice by each sitting judge when full ceremonial dress is called for. It is worn every year on 9 November, when the new Lord Mayor of the City of London is presented to the Law Courts. It also forms part of the regalia of a judge of the High Court of Northern Ireland.

The black cap was worn by judges in Northern Ireland passing death sentences until the death penalty was abolished by the Northern Ireland (Emergency Provisions) Act 1973.

The black cap was also used in Ireland, whose legal system was modelled on the English courts. It remained in use in the Irish Free State and Republic of Ireland; there was only one such cap, kept by the county registrar in Dublin's Four Courts. George Gavan Duffy was the first judge to break the tradition, not wearing the black cap when pronouncing a death sentence in 1937. Thereafter, it was a matter of personal preference, with some judges wearing it and some not, as there was no formal rule or law requiring them to do so. The last execution took place in 1954, although death sentences were sometimes passed and then commuted to life imprisonment until the death penalty was finally abolished by the Criminal Justice Act 1990.

It has been claimed, with little conclusive proof, that the word "kibosh" has its origin in the Irish caip bháis ("cap of death"), referring to the black cap. Such claims go back as far as in the era of the infamous John Toler, 1st Earl of Norbury (Chief Justice, 1800–1827).

== See also ==
- List of hat styles
