= Chimneys (play) =

2003 play by crime writer Agatha Christie

- Original language: English
- Written by: Agatha Christie
- Based on: The Secret of Chimneys

Premiere
- Date: 16 October 2003
- Place: Canada

Chimneys is a play by crime writer Agatha Christie and is based upon her own 1925 novel The Secret of Chimneys.

== Background ==
The play was written in 1931 and was due to open at the Embassy Theatre in Swiss Cottage in December of that year. One year previously, Black Coffee, Christie's first performed stage play, had opened at the same theatre.

As was the law at the time, the play was vetted by the Lord Chamberlain's Office and passed for performance. Several press articles referred to the new play but suddenly, and without explanation, the theatre substituted Mary Broome, a four-act comedy from 1912 by Allan Monkhouse, in its place.

While not forgotten, it remained unknown other than to a small group of aficionados until December 2001 when John Paul Fischbach, the Artistic Director of Vertigo Theatre in Calgary, Alberta, Canada, was looking to re-launch the company after it had been forced to vacate its home in the Calgary Science Centre and was opening in its new home of the Vertigo Theatre Centre. In looking for something special and relatively unknown to celebrate the opening, Fischbach contacted Agatha Christie Limited, who handle the author's rights, and was told by its chairman (and Christie's grandson, Mathew Prichard) that the only relatively unknown stage work that could be performed was the 1930s play A Daughter's a Daughter which was performed once in the 1950s but had previously been revised into a 1952 novel published under the nom-de-plume of Mary Westmacott. Fischbach had a copy of the play available and in looking through it, found another manuscript headed: Chimneys: A play in three acts by Agatha Christie. He again contacted Prichard who said that he had heard of the play but said he had never seen a copy. Prichard contacted the British Library who located the typescript (together with notes suggesting Laurence Olivier for one of the roles) and Vertigo Theatre presented the play's world premiere on 16 October 2003 with Mathew Prichard in the audience.

The UK premiere took place on 1 June 2006 when it was performed by the Pitlochry Festival Theatre Company. The US premiere took place on 12 June 2008 as part of the International Mystery Writers' Festival in Owensboro, Kentucky. The Australian premiere was on 6 March 2021 at the Genesian Theatre.

The play has been published in the collection "Discovering New Mysteries Scripts" by on Stage Press, a division of Samuel French, Inc.

== UK premiere – Pitlochry (2006) ==
Director: John Durnin

Cast:

- Jonathan Battersby as Tredwell
- Jonathan Coote as Lemoine
- Jacqueline Dutoit as Old Lady
- Robin Harvey Edwards as Lord Caterham
- Michele Gallagher as Lady Eileen Brent
- Martyn James as The Hon. George Lomax
- Jonathan Dryden Taylor as Bill Eversleigh
- Darrell Brockis as Anthony Cade
- Flora Berkeley as Virginia Revel
- Richard Addison as the Stranger
- Ronald Simon as Superintendent Battle
- Matthew Lloyd Davies as Herbert Banks
- Richard Galazka as Boris Anchoukoff
