= Brogue (accent) =

Irish accent

A brogue (/broʊɡ/) is a regional accent or dialect, especially an Irish accent in English.

The first use of the term brogue originated around 1525 to refer to an Irish accent, as used by John Skelton, and it still, most generally, refers to any Irish accent. Less commonly, it may also refer to various rhotic regional dialects of English, in particular certain ones of the United States (such as the "Ocracoke brogue"), the English West Country, or Scotland (although historically Scottish accents were referred to as "burrs", an imitative word due to Scottish English's distinct R sound).

Certain regional accents in North America, such as Mission brogue spoken in the Mission District of San Francisco, and Ottawa Valley Brogue spoken in the Ottawa River valley of Canada, are associated with Irish or Irish American populations in those areas.

The word was noted in the 1500s by John Skelton; there is also a record of it in Thomas Sheridan's 1689 General Dictionary of the English Language. Multiple etymologies have been proposed: it may derive from the Irish bróg ('shoe'), the type of shoe traditionally worn by the people of Ireland and the Scottish Highlands, and hence possibly originally meant "the speech of those who call a shoe a 'brogue'". It is debated that the term comes from the Irish word barróg, meaning "a hold (on the tongue)", thus "accent" or "speech impediment".

An alternative etymology suggested that brogue means 'impediment', and that it came from barróg which is homophonous with bróg in Munster Irish. However, research indicates that the word for 'impediment' is actually bachlóg and that the term brogue to describe speech is known to Irish speakers in Munster only as an English word.

A famous false etymology states that the word stems from the supposed perception that the Irish spoke English so peculiarly that it was as if they did so "with a shoe in their mouths".

== See also ==
- Language contact
- List of English words of Irish origin
- Regional accents of English
