= Ingle =

Ingle may refer to:

== People ==
- Ingle (surname), includes a list of people with the name
- Ingle Martin (born 1982), American former football quarterback

== Places in the United States ==
- Ingle, California, a community
- Ingle, Florida, an unincorporated community
- Ingle, Wisconsin, an unincorporated community

== See also ==
- Ingles
- Ingleby (disambiguation)
- Inglenook (disambiguation)
