= Laurence Suhner =

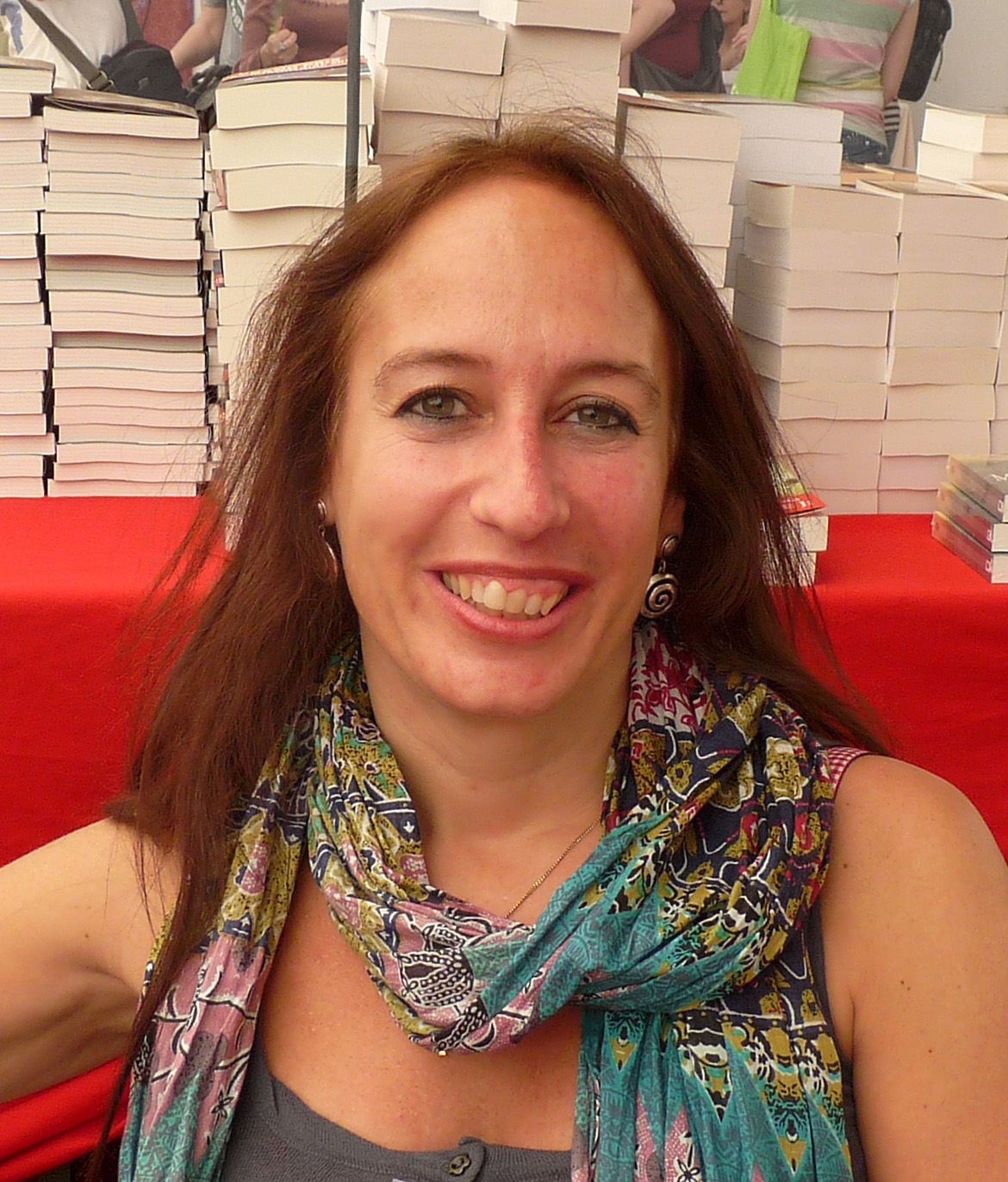
- Laurence Suhner (2012)
- Born: Geneva, Switzerland
- Language: French
- Genre: Science fiction

Website
- suhner.net

Laurence Suhner (born 1 May 1968) is a Swiss science fiction writer and graphic artist.

Born in Geneva, Suhner studied Indian dance and music and attended four semesters of physics courses at the University of Geneva. She published several graphic novels in the 1980s and 2000s, and started writing prose science fiction in 2006.

Her first novel, the hard SF planetary romance Vestiges, was published in 2012. It received the 2013 Futuriales Révélation Adulte award, as well as the 2013 Prix Bob Morane for best French language novel. The novel is the first of the QuanTika trilogy, of which the second volume, L'ouvreur des chemins, was published in 2013 and the third, Origines, in 2015.

Suhner teaches creative writing at the University of Geneva.

== Works ==
=== Novels ===
- QuanTika trilogy
1. Vestiges. L'Atalante. 2012. ISBN 978-2841725892.
2. L'ouvreur des chemins. L'Atalante. 2013. ISBN 9782841726516.
3. Origines. L'Atalante. 2015. ISBN 9782841727100.

=== Novellas ===
- 2017: The Perfect Chord, translated by Sheryl Curtis, in: Anomaly 25
- 2010: Homéostasie, in Dimension Suisse : une anthologie de science-fiction romande, Rivière Blanche, 2010.
- 2009: Timhkâ, in : Galaxies nouvelle série n° 4/46, GALAXIES 3A, April 2009
- 2006 : GeneV 2106, in La Tribune de Genève, Numéro spécial science-fiction suisse, 2006.

=== Comics ===
- 2007: Confidences, writer and artist, in Mes Semblables, ouvrage Collectif, published by ACOR SOS Racisme Suisse
- 2007: Le Chaman, writer and artist, in Virus
- 2006: Eclipse, artist, in Pompiers volontaires
- 2004: Dame Jeanne, writer and artist, in La Vie en Verre
- 2002: Le Secret de Chimneys, artist, published by Emmanuel Proust, ISBN 2-84810-006-0; an adaptation of The Secret of Chimneys by Agatha Christie
- 2000: Éclats d'Âme, artist, published by Drozophile
- 1987: Zoto Zata ou la statue perdue, published by Ed. Jean-Marie Bouchain.
- 1984: Rastapanique, published by Ed. Jean-Marie Bouchain.

=== Short stories ===
- 2017: "The terminator", published in Nature
