= Chimney (sculpture) =

Brick sculpture in Indiana, United States

- Artist: Ellerbe Associates (now Ellerbe Becket)
- Year: c. 1986
- Medium: Brick, limestone, concrete
- Location: Riley Hospital for Children, Indiana University-Purdue University Indianapolis, Indianapolis, Indiana, United States
- 39°46.599′N 086°10.728′W

Chimney is a brick sculpture which contains multiple architectural and sculptural elements, and is part of a larger, more open plaza designed for children. It is located outside the lobby atrium of the Riley Hospital for Children.

== Description ==
In many ways this object resembles a chimney, however at the same time it functions as a pavilion. The four limestone arches and corresponding columns at the base hold up a red brick column that incrementally widens near the top; the entire height of the sculpture is approximately 25 feet tall. Once inside the object, it is clear that the chimney is open. It is not clear if the elements comprising the object were recycled or fabricated specifically for this piece.

The exterior of the object is primarily a brick—red brick, while the interior is a cream-colored brick.

On the front and rear sides of the chimney, there is a small stone sculpture of the face a child (cherub).

The front and rear arches are approximately five feet tall from the center to the base, and approximately five feet wide. The side arches are smaller, about five feet tall and four feet across. Each side column is five and a half feet tall from capital to pedestal and 18 inches wide. The widest dimension of the object is approximately eleven feet.

== Information ==
Chimney was part of a Riley Hospital for Children construction project, which was completed about 1987. In 1983, when the Indiana University Trustees approved the construction, the cost of the entire Riley project was estimated at $55 million, although when it was completed, another source reports that it cost $56.5 million. The project, which included the addition of a four-story wing, also created a “spacious outdoor plaza where the children can eat lunch, play or take part in activities away from normal hospital surroundings.”

The architects of Chimney, Ellerbe Associates chose to use red bricks in its construction in order to “’capture the charm’ of the past.” These red bricks also are used in other nearby structures in the plaza, and match the building around them. Further, Ellerbe Associates, created the Chimney’s plaza to be “an abstraction of a house.”

== Artist ==
Although several companies were involved in the entire Riley construction project, Ellerbe Associates was the principal designer for Chimney. This Minnesota-based firm has since merged with Welton Becket & Associates to become Ellerbe Becket. Other Ellerbe projects include the Mayo Clinic Diagnostic Building in Rochester, Minnesota, which included “gardens, fountains and sculpture…”
