= Chimney Rock (Jackson Butte) =

Butte in Colorado, United States

- Jackson Butte
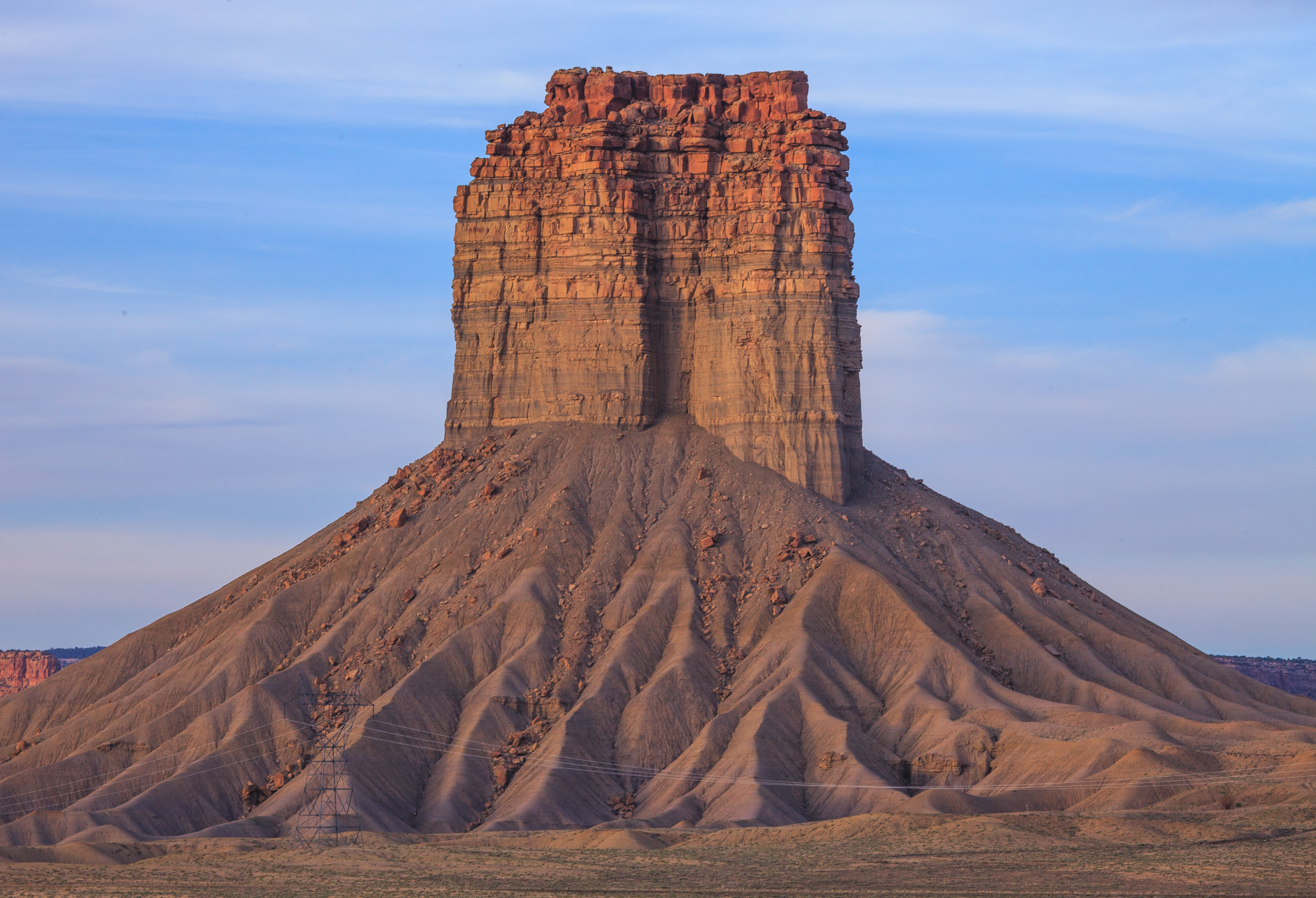
- Southwest aspect

Highest point
- Elevation: 6,110 ft (1,860 m)
- Prominence: 690 ft (210 m)
- Parent peak: West Ute Mesa (7,088 ft)
- Isolation: 3.71 mi (5.97 km)
- Coordinates: 37°04′41″N 108°43′07″W

Geography
- Location within Colorado Location within the United States
- Location: Montezuma County, Colorado, U.S.
- Parent range: Colorado Plateau
- Topo map: USGS Tanner Mesa

Geology
- Rock age: Cretaceous
- Rock type: Point Lookout Sandstone

Climbing
- Easiest route: class 5.x climbing

Chimney Rock is a 6,110-foot (1,860 meter) elevation pillar located within the Ute Mountain Tribal Park, in Montezuma County of southwest Colorado. This landmark is situated one mile southeast of the junction of U.S. Route 491 and US 160, and towers 900 feet above the floor of the Mancos River Valley. This geographical feature is also known as Jackson Butte, named for William Henry Jackson (1843–1942), photographer and explorer famous for his images of the American West who visited this area during the Hayden Survey. He was the first to photograph the cliff dwellings in this Mesa Verde region of the Four Corners area.

== Geology ==
Chimney Rock is located on the Colorado Plateau, and is composed of Cretaceous Point Lookout Sandstone, which is the oldest of the three formations that make up the Mesaverde Group which is common to the Mesa Verde region. The cliff-forming Point Lookout Sandstone overlays a pedestal of softer, slope-forming Mancos Shale. Precipitation runoff from this feature drains into the Mancos River watershed.

== Gallery ==
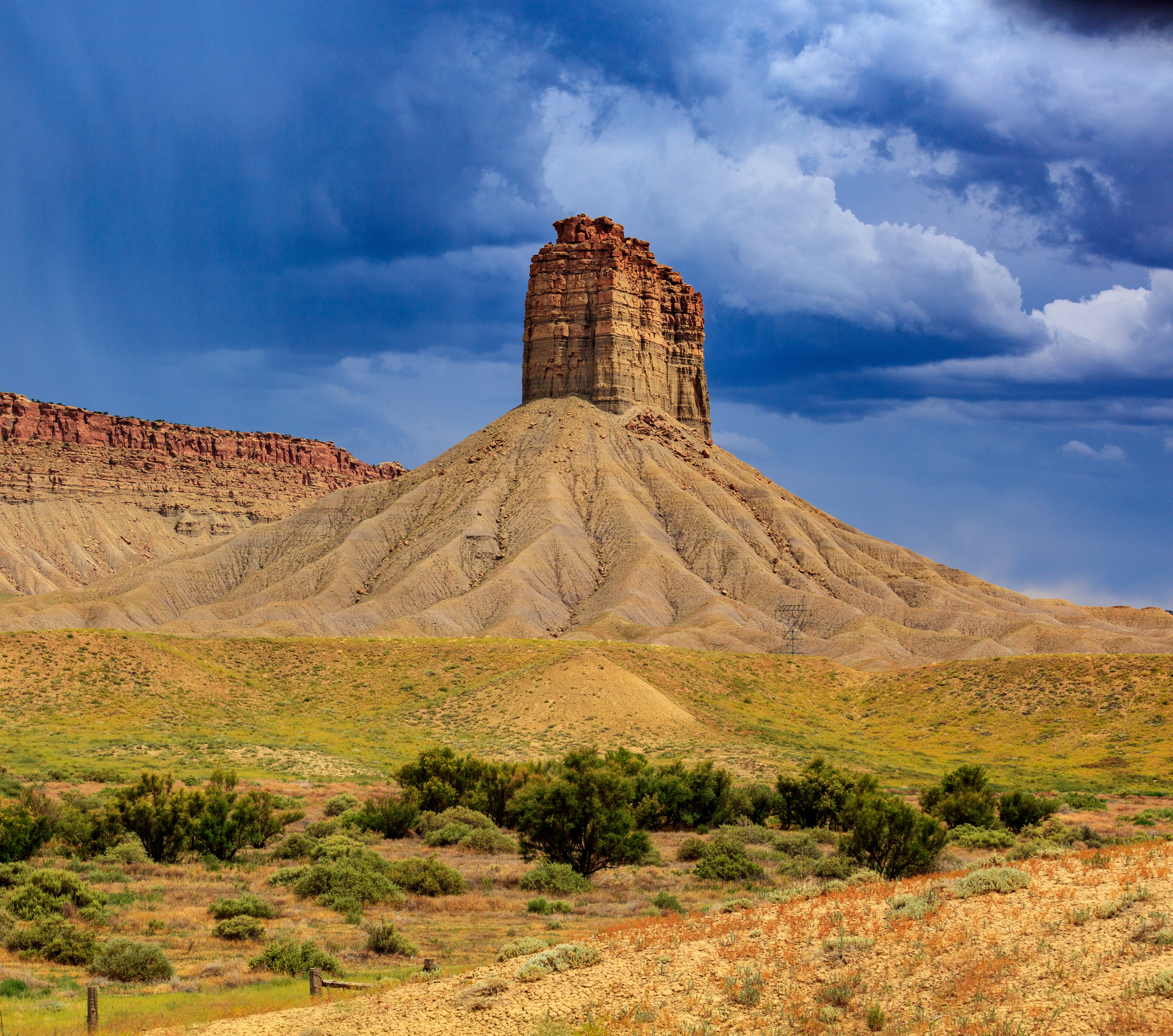
Northwest aspect

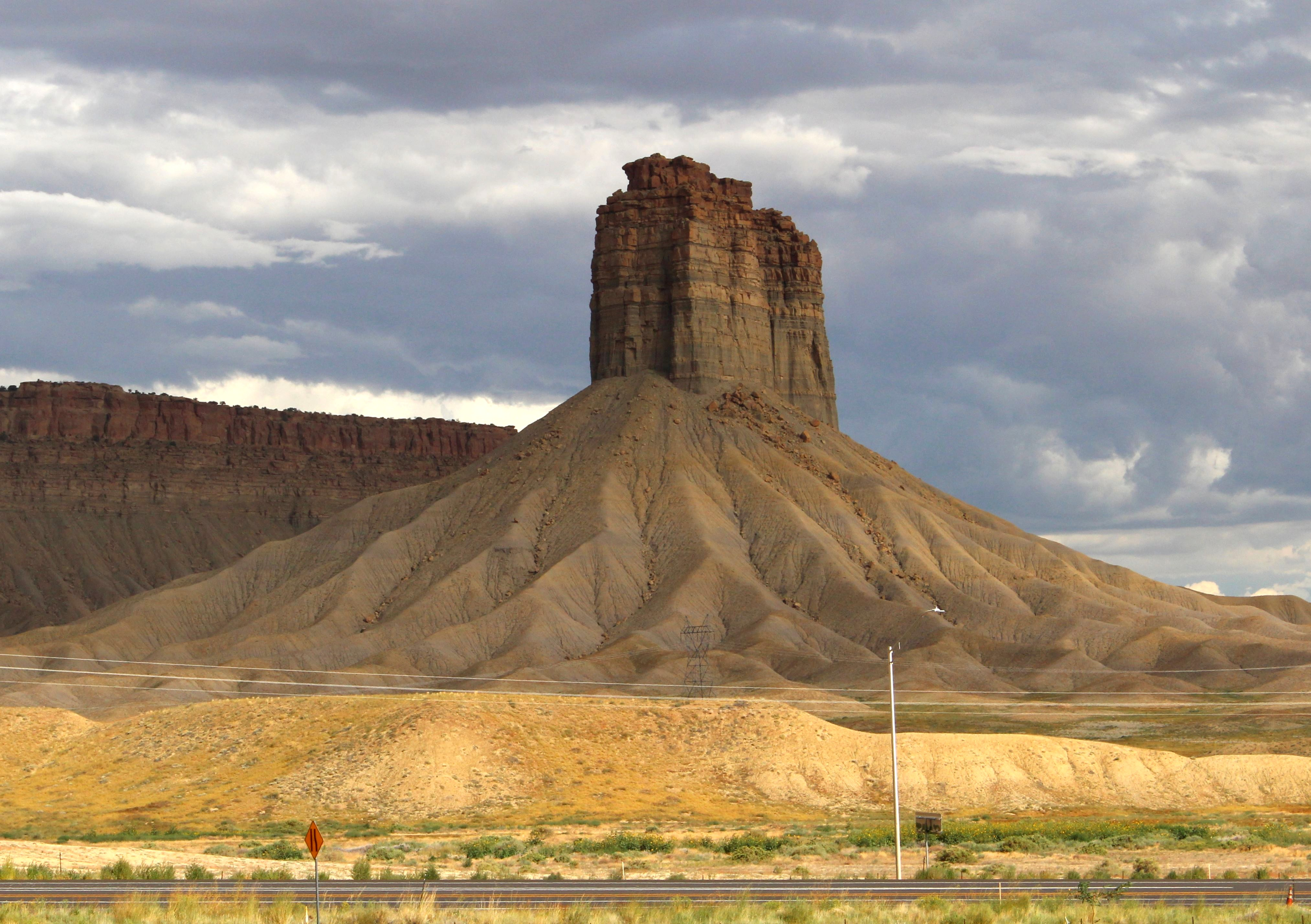

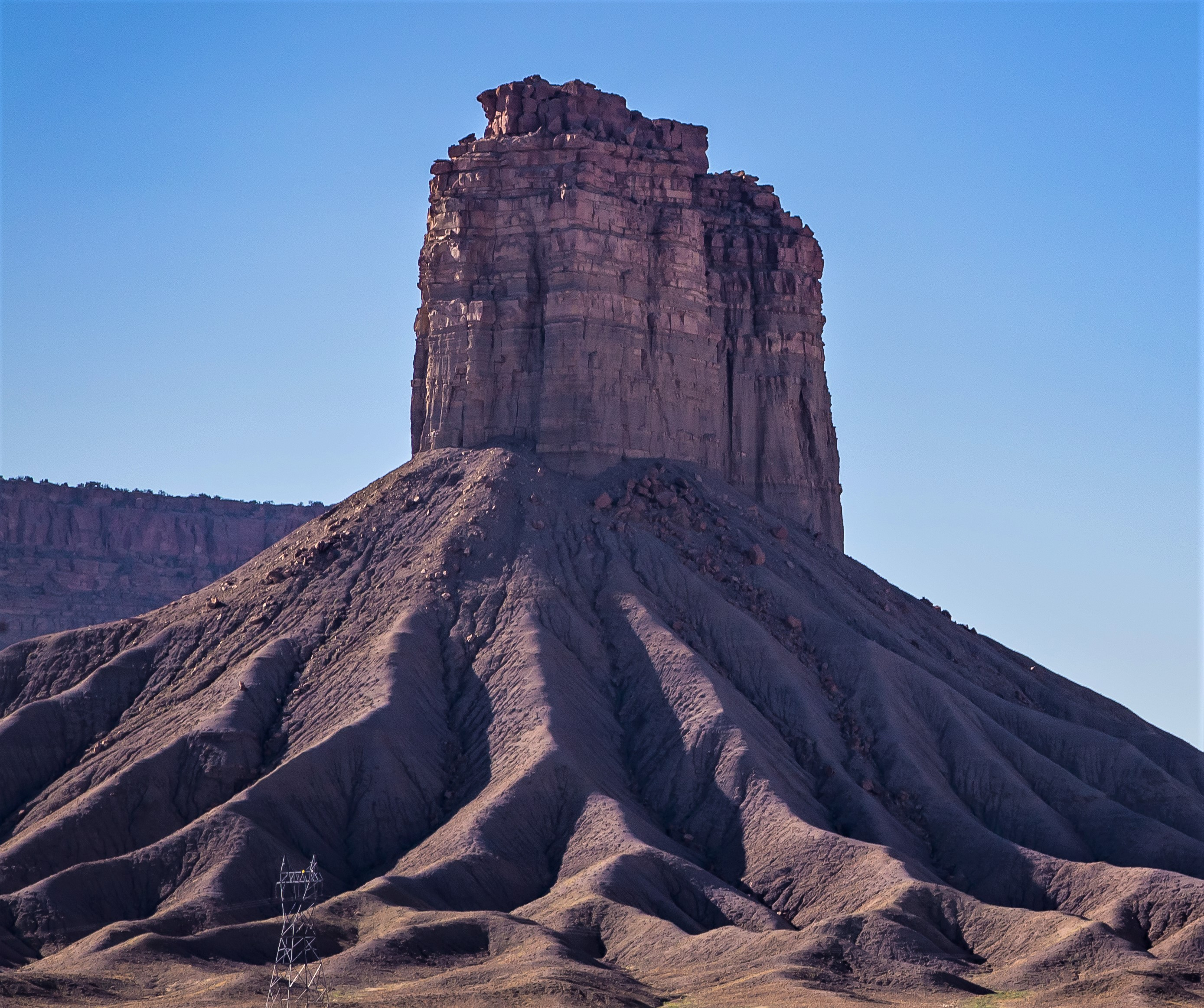

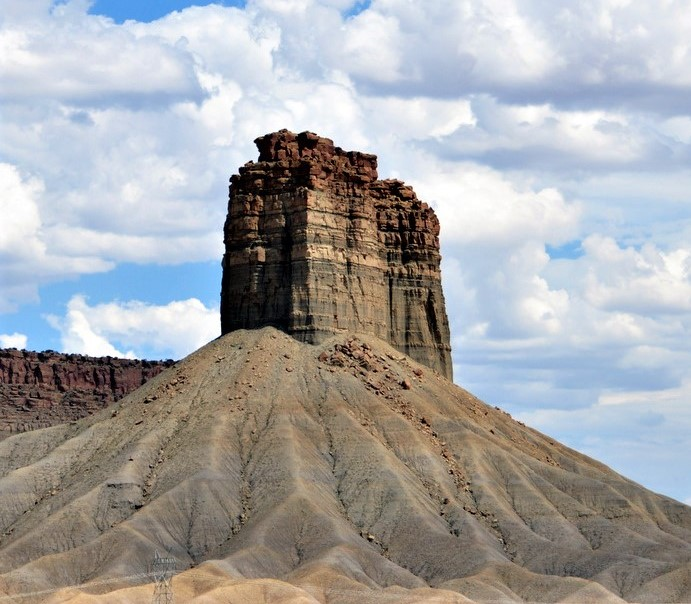

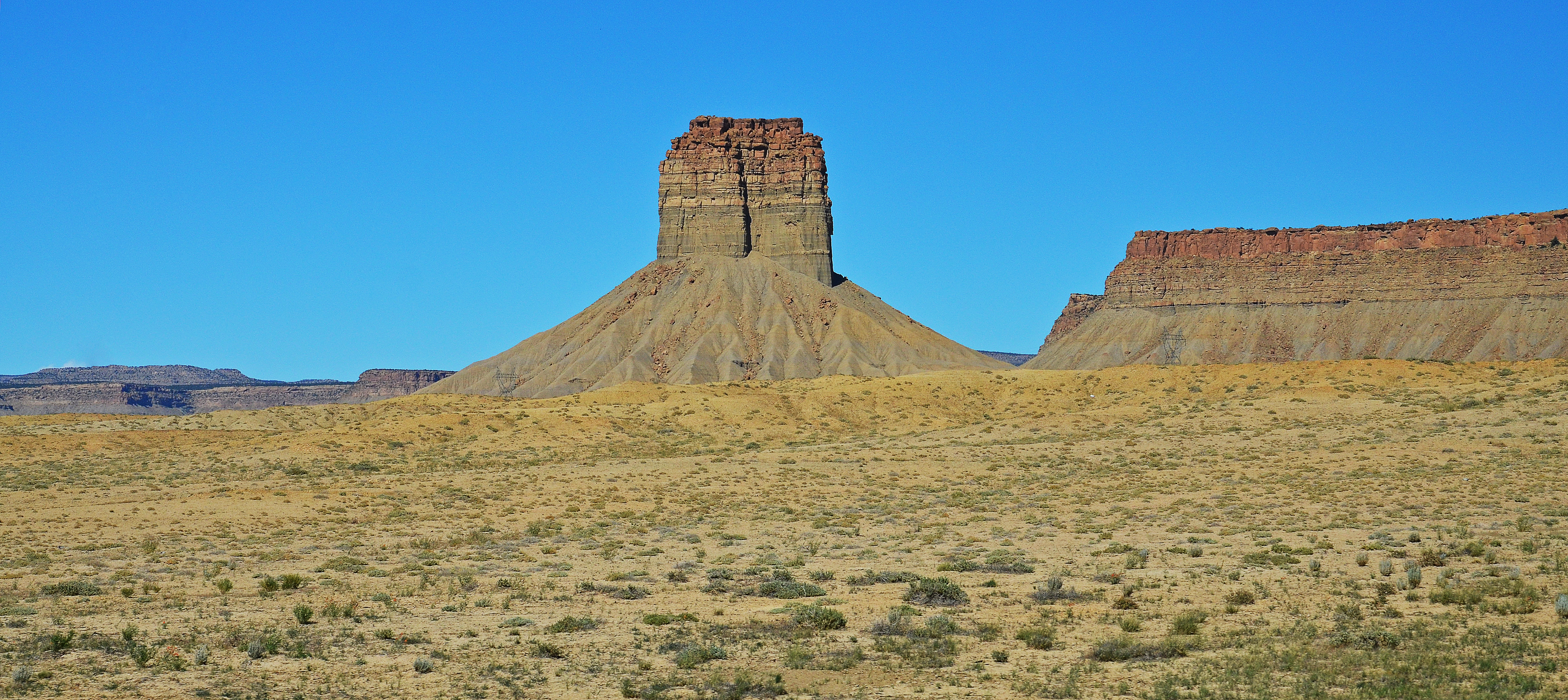

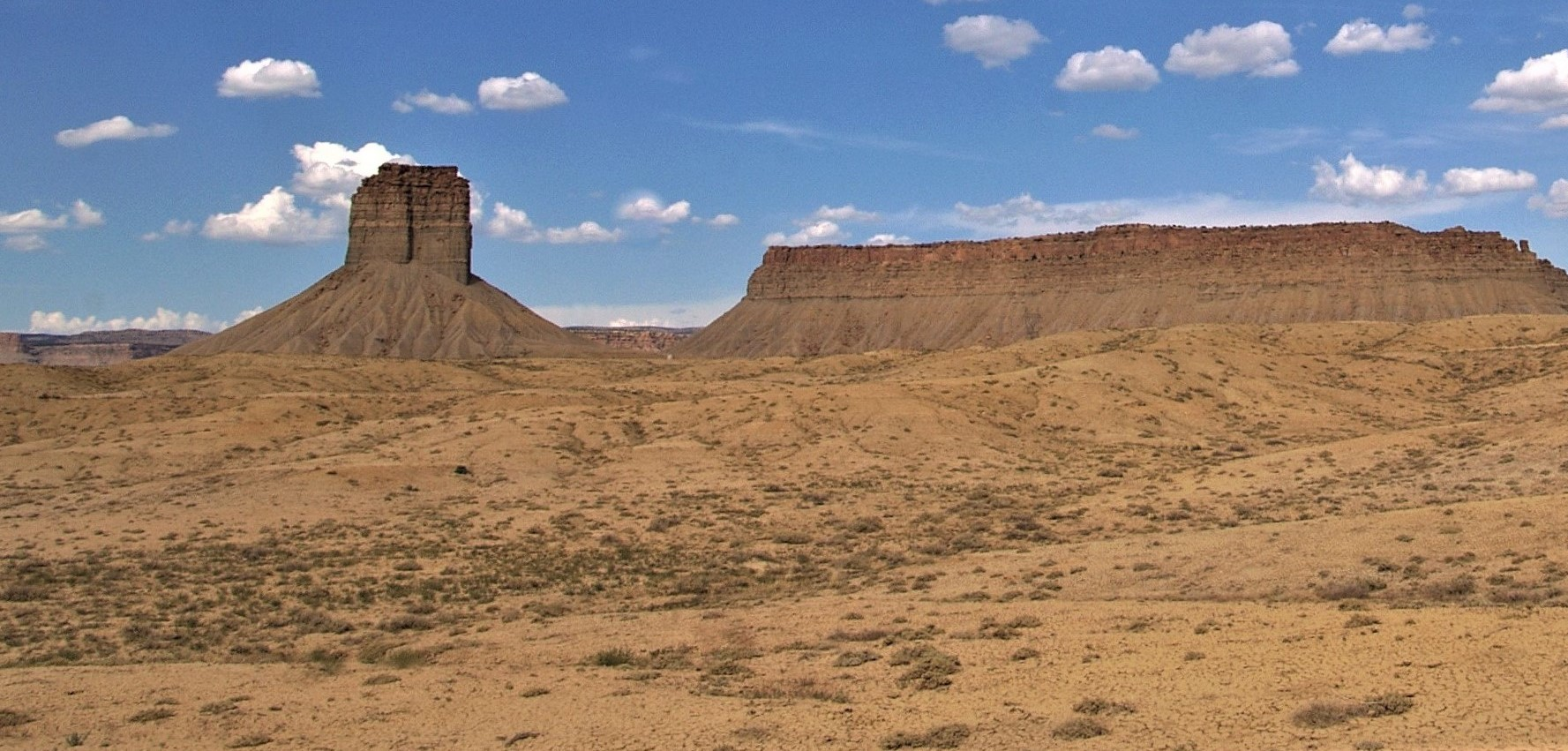

== See also ==
- List of rock formations in the United States
- Chimney Rock (Colorado)
