= Dalry =

Dalry may refer to:

- St John's Town of Dalry, or just Dalry, a village in Dumfries and Galloway, Scotland
- Dalry, Edinburgh, an area of the city of Edinburgh, Scotland
- Dalry, North Ayrshire, a town in Scotland

== See also ==
- Dalrigh
- Battle of Dalrigh
