= Bundle Brent =

Fictional character by Agatha Christie

Lady Eileen "Bundle" Brent is a fictional character of two of the Agatha Christie novels, The Secret of Chimneys (1925) and The Seven Dials Mystery (1929), described as a spirited "it girl".

== Family ==
Bundle was the eldest daughter of Clement Edward Alistair Brent, 9th Marquess of Caterham (simply called "Lord Caterham"). She had two sisters, Daisy and Dulcie. She described her late mother as having "got tired of having nothing but girls and died". Her mother "thought someone else could take on the job of providing an heir". Bundle’s uncle, the 8th Marquess, was Foreign Secretary in the British Government (a circumstance possibly suggested by Marquess Curzon of Kedleston's having held that post from 1919–24).

The Brents' seat was Chimneys, a country house based on Abney Hall, Cheshire. The family’s residual links with the Foreign Office, including the presumption, resented by the 9th Marquess, that the house would continue to be available for purposes of state, as it had been when his late brother was in Government, were an important ingredient of the two Chimneys novels.

== Character ==
As a child she was "long-legged" and "impish", growing into a “tall, dark” adult with an “attractive boyish face”. She is described as resourceful, headstrong, vivacious and charming, with sharp, penetrative grey eyes that could be disconcerting to others.

== Appearances ==
=== Novels ===
The Secret of Chimneys and The Seven Dials Mystery were published (and explicitly set) four years apart. The intervening period was momentous for Agatha Christie herself. The Secret of Chimneys, which concerned the future of the fictional "Herzoslovakian" royal family and their jewels, described by literary critic Robert Barnard as the best of her earlier novels, marked the end of her association with the publisher Bodley Head. In 1926, she went missing for eleven days, ending up in an hotel in Harrogate, some two hundred miles from her home in Berkshire, and in 1928, she was divorced from her first husband.

In The Seven Dials Mystery, Bundle turned to amateur sleuthing after the death of two Foreign Office officials, both house guests of the Coote family, who had been renting Chimneys. She was drawn, with a male companion, to a secret society in the Seven Dials district of London, in effect competing with Superintendent Battle to get to the bottom of a sinister intrigue. According to her biographer, Christie played around with names and characters when drafting the story, although she always intended it to be a vehicle for the energetic young woman she had introduced in The Secret of Chimneys.

== Wodehousian comparisons ==
There are parallels between the Chimneys novels and those of the humorist P. G. Wodehouse, both having light-hearted banter, amusing characters, and country-house settings. Agatha Christie was a great admirer of Wodehouse and described The Seven Dials Mystery as "the light-hearted thriller type" of novel. Bill Eversleigh has been described as "an amiable if vacuous young man who has staggered in from a Wodehouse novel".

== Portrayals ==
A dramatisation of The Seven Dials Mystery was broadcast by London Weekend Television in 1980, with Cheryl Campbell (born 1949) in the role of Bundle Brent. This production was, with LWT's Why Didn't They Ask Evans? and Partners in Crime, in the vanguard of a resurgence of classic crime fiction on British television in the 1980s.

At Christmas 2010, ITV broadcast an adaptation of The Secret of Chimneys, set in 1955 (but harking back to a ball in 1932), which, unlike the novel, imported Christie's perennial Miss Marple (Julia McKenzie) and made a number of other changes. Dervla Kirwan, in her late thirties, played Bundle, who, though still the daughter of Lord Caterham, was cast as the sister of 23-year-old Lady Virginia Revel (Charlotte Salt), an unrelated character in the original story. Of the two, Lady Virginia appeared to have more in common with the Bundle of the novels. The Radio Times observed that this production was "classic Agatha Christie, even though it's only distantly related to her original ... purists will be utterly flummoxed - and the plot has more holes in it than the murder victim".

An audiobook of The Seven Dials Mystery, read by Emilia Fox, was released in 2005.

Christie's stage play Chimneys, written in 1931, eventually received its UK premiere at Pitlochry, Scotland in 2006, with Bundle portrayed by Michele Gallagher.

Mia McKenna-Bruce played Bundle in Seven Dials, the 2026 Chris Chibnall adaptation for Netflix.
