= List of English words of Scots origin =

List of English words of Scots origin is a list of English language words of Scots origin. See also "List of English words of Scottish Gaelic origin", which contains many words which were borrowed via Highland Scots.

Blackmail
A form of extortion carried out by the Border Reivers, borrowed into English with less violent connotations.
blatant
Bonspiel
caddie or caddy
canny
Also Northern English. From English can in older sense of "to know how."
clan
Borrowed from Gaelic clann (family, stock, off-spring).
cosy
firth
Derived from Old Icelandic fjǫrdic (see fjord)
glamour
Meaning magic, enchantment, spell. From English grammar and Scottish gramarye (occult learning or scholarship).
gloaming
Middle English (Scots) gloming, from Old English glomung "twilight", from OE glom
golf
glengarry
(or Glengarry bonnet) A brimless Scottish cap with a crease running down the crown, often with ribbons at the back. Named after the title of the clan chief Alexander Ranaldson MacDonell of Glengarry (1771–1828), who invented it.
gumption
Common sense or shrewdness.
halloween
haver or haiver
To talk nonsense. Scottish and North English dialect.
laddie
A boy.
lassie
A girl.
links
Sandy, rolling ground, from Old English hlinc (ridge).
pernickety
From pernicky.
minging
literally "stinking", from Scots "to ming".
plaid
From Gaelic plaide or simply a development of ply, to fold, giving plied then plaid after the Scots pronunciation.
pony
Borrowed from obsolete French poulenet (little foal) from Latin pullāmen.
raid
scone
Probably from Dutch schoon.
shinny
Pond or street hockey in Canada. From an alternative name for the Scots sport shinty.
skulduggery
From Scots sculduddery
tweed
Cloth being woven in a twilled rather than a plain pattern. from tweel
wee
Small, tiny, minute.
wow
Exclamation
wraith

== See also ==
- List of English words of Scottish Gaelic origin
- Lists of English words of international origin
