= Caird =

Caird is a surname and may refer to:

- Edward Caird, Scottish philosopher
- G. B. Caird, Biblical scholar
- James Caird (disambiguation)
- John Caird (disambiguation)
- Maureen Caird, Australian athlete
- Mona Caird, English novelist and essayist

== See also ==
- Messrs Caird & Company of Greenock, a Scottish shipbuilding and engineering firm (1828–1916)
- Card (disambiguation)
