= Chimney Peak =

Chimney Peak may refer to:

- Chimney Peak (Canada), Alberta/British Columbia
- Chimney Peak (Washington), Jefferson County
