= Chimney Rock (Idaho) =

Mountain in Idaho, United States

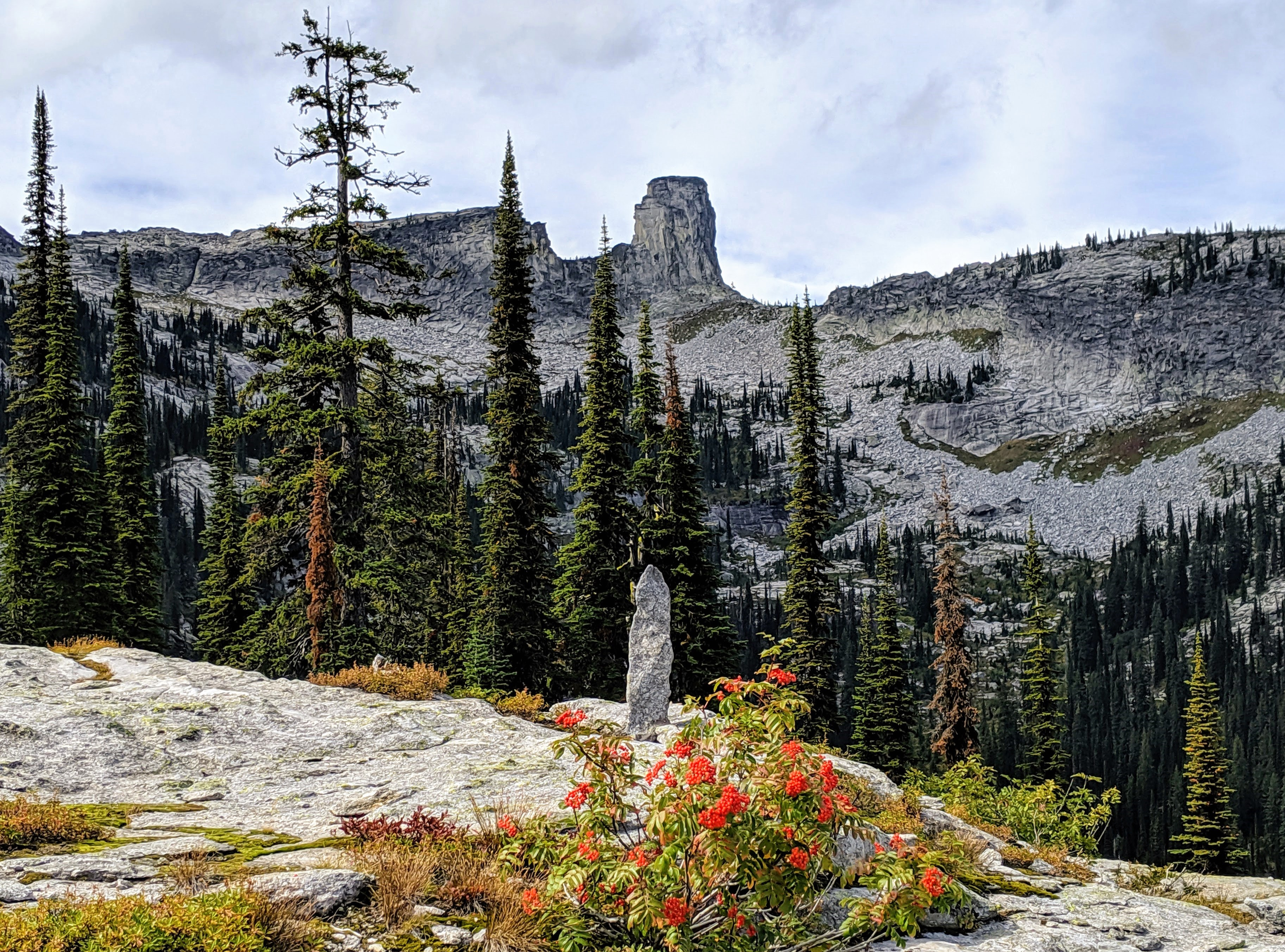
- East aspect

Highest point
- Elevation: 7,124 ft (2,171 m)
- Prominence: 184 ft (56 m)
- Parent peak: Mount Roothaan (7,326 ft)
- Isolation: 0.51 mi (0.82 km)
- Coordinates: 48°37′09″N 116°41′52″W

Geography
- Location within Idaho Location within the United States
- Country: United States
- State: Idaho
- County: Boundary
- Protected area: Kaniksu National Forest
- Parent range: Selkirk Mountains
- Topo map: USGS Mount Roothaan

Geology
- Rock age: Cretaceous
- Rock type(s): Granite, Granodiorite

Climbing
- First ascent: 1934
- Easiest route: West Face class 5.3

Chimney Rock is a 7,124-foot-elevation (2,171 m) mountain summit in Boundary County, Idaho, United States.

== Description ==
Chimney Rock is a distinctive landmark and popular rock-climbing destination in the southern Selkirk Mountains. The mountain is situated six miles (9.7 km) east of Priest Lake on land managed by Idaho Panhandle National Forests. Precipitation runoff from the mountain's western slope drains to Priest Lake, whereas the east slope drains to the Pack River, and both are part of the Pend Oreille River drainage basin. Topographic relief is significant as the summit rises over 3,700 feet (1,128 meters) above the Pack River in three miles (4.8 km). This mountain's descriptive toponym has been officially adopted by the United States Board on Geographic Names. The granitic tower has earned the nickname "Lightning rod of North Idaho." The first ascent of the summit was made on September 8, 1934, by John Carey, Mart Chamberlain, Fred Thieme, and Byron Ward via the West Face.

== Climate ==
Based on the Köppen climate classification, Chimney Rock is located in an alpine subarctic climate zone with long, cold, snowy winters, and cool to warm summers. Winter temperatures can drop below 0 °F with wind chill factors below −10 °F. Climbers can expect afternoon rain and lightning from summer thunderstorms.

== Climbing chronology ==
History of early first ascents made by 1972:

Route	Rating	Year	Climbers
West Face	5.3	1934	J. Carey, M. Chamberlain, F. Thieme, B. Ward
West Face (free solo)	5.3	1935	John Ferris Boothe
Northeast Face	5.8	1959	Don Bergman, Ed Cooper
East Face	5.9	1961	Ed Cooper, Dave Hiser
South Nose	5.7	1966	Fred Beckey, Jerry Fuller
West Face Direct	5.8	1968	Chris Kopczynski, John Roskelley
Broken Thumb	5.7	1968	Chris Kopczynski, Cary Kopczynski
Yellowjacket	5.7	1970	John Roskelley, Jim Spearman
Sanchos	5.9	1971	Chris Kopczynski, John and Joyce Roskelley
Boogie Jive	5.6	1972	Will Parks, Jim Spearman

== See also ==
- List of mountain peaks of Idaho

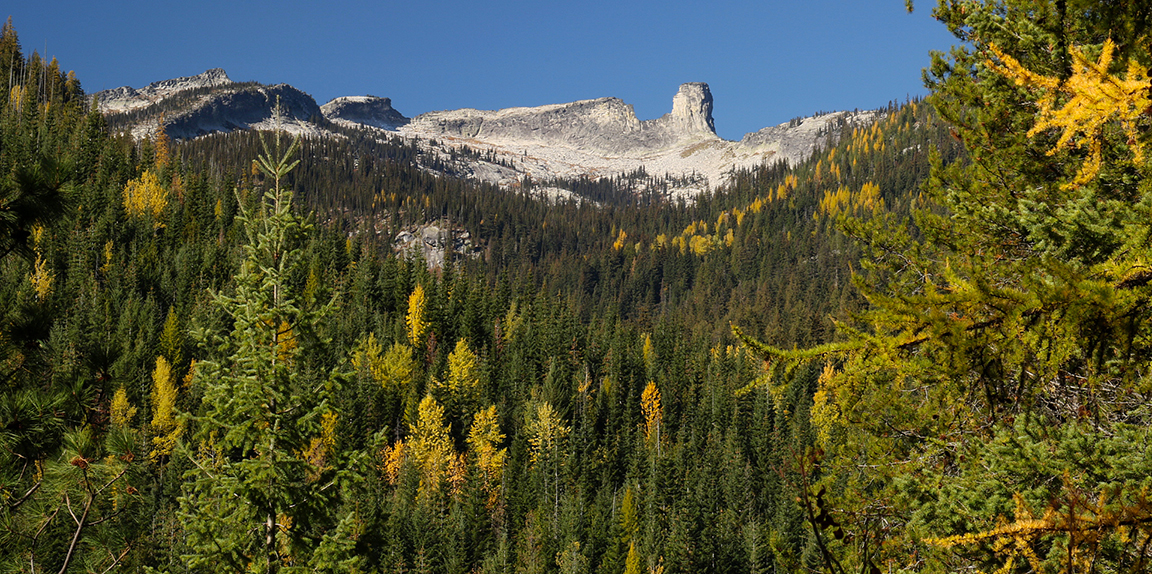
Chimney Rock
