= The Seven Dials Mystery =

1929 mystery novel by Agatha Christie

- Dust-jacket illustration of the first UK edition
- Author: Agatha Christie
- Language: English
- Series: Superintendent Battle
- Genre: Crime novel
- Publisher: William Collins & Sons (UK); Dodd, Mead and Company (US)
- Publication date: 24 January 1929
- Publication place: United Kingdom
- Media type: Print (hardback & paperback)
- Pages: 282 (first edition, hardback)
- Preceded by: The Secret of Chimneys
- Followed by: Murder Is Easy
- Text: The Seven Dials Mystery at Wikisource

The Seven Dials Mystery is a mystery novel by Agatha Christie, first published in the UK by William Collins & Sons on 24 January 1929 and in the US by Dodd, Mead and Company later in the same year.

In this novel, Christie brings back the characters from an earlier novel, The Secret of Chimneys: Lady Eileen (Bundle) Brent, Lord Caterham, Bill Eversleigh, George Lomax, Tredwell and Superintendent Battle. The novel received mostly unfavourable reviews at the time of its publication.

== Plot summary ==
Sir Oswald and Lady Coote host a party at the stately home Chimneys, which they have rented for the season. The guest list includes Gerry Wade, Jimmy Thesiger, Ronny Devereux, Bill Eversleigh and Rupert "Pongo" Bateman. Since Wade has a bad habit of oversleeping, the others play a joke on him by placing eight alarm clocks in his room and timing them to go off at intervals. The next morning, a footman finds Wade dead in his bed, with a sleeping draught on his nightstand. Thesiger notices that one of the eight alarm clocks is missing. It is later found in a hedge.

Lord Caterham and his daughter Lady Eileen “Bundle” Brent move back into Chimneys. When Bundle drives to London to see Eversleigh, Ronny Devereux jumps out in front of her car. Before he dies, Devereux mutters "Seven Dials..." and "Tell...Jimmy Thesiger." Bundle gets his body to a doctor, who tells her that her car did not hit Devereux; he was shot.

Seven Dials turns out to be a seedy nightclub and gambling den in the Seven Dials area of London. Bundle recognises the doorman as Alfred, a footman from Chimneys. Alfred tells her that he left Chimneys for far higher wages offered by Mosgorovsky, owner of the club. Alfred takes Bundle into a secret room, where she hides in a cupboard and witnesses a meeting of six people wearing hoods with clock faces. They talk of the always-missing "Number Seven", and about an upcoming party at Wyvern Abbey, where a scientist called Eberhard will offer a secret formula for sale to the British Air Minister.

At the party, the formula is stolen, but retrieved by Wade's stepsister; and Jimmy Thesiger is shot in his right arm. Thesiger tells how he fought a man who climbed down the ivy. The next morning, Battle finds a charred left-handed glove with teeth marks in the fireplace. He theorises that the thief threw the gun onto the lawn from the terrace and then climbed back into the house via the ivy. Bundle’s father reports that Bauer, the footman who replaced Alfred, is missing.

Thesiger rings up Bundle and Gerry Wade's stepsister Loraine and tells them to meet him and Eversleigh at the Seven Dials club. Bundle shows Thesiger the room where the Seven Dials meet. Loraine finds Eversleigh unconscious in the car and they take him into the club. Thesiger says that he will go for a doctor.

Someone knocks Bundle unconscious and she comes round in Eversleigh's arms. Mr Mosgorovsky takes them into the meeting of the Seven Dials, where Number Seven is revealed as Superintendent Battle. He reveals that they are a group of people doing secret service work for the government. Battle tells Bundle that the association has succeeded with their main target, an international criminal whose stock in trade is the theft of secret formulae: Jimmy Thesiger was arrested that afternoon with his accomplice, Loraine Wade. Battle explains that Thesiger killed Wade and Devereux when they got onto his track. Devereux took the eighth clock from Wade's room to see if anyone reacted to there being "seven dials". At Wyvern Abbey, Thesiger stole the formula, passed it to Loraine, then shot himself in his right arm and disposed of his left-hand glove using his teeth. Eversleigh feigned unconsciousness in the car outside the Seven Dials club. Thesiger never went for a doctor, but hid in the club, and knocked Bundle unconscious. Bundle takes Wade's place in the Seven Dials and marries Bill Eversleigh.

== Characters ==
- Sir Oswald Coote: self-made millionaire.
- Maria, Lady Coote: his wife.
- Tredwell: the butler at Chimneys.
- MacDonald: head gardener at Chimneys.
- Rupert Bateman: Sir Oswald’s secretary. Was at school with Jimmy Thesiger, and called Pongo; a double of Rupert Baxter.
- Helen, Nancy and Vera “Socks” Daventry: Guests of the Cootes’ house party at Chimneys,
- Bill Eversleigh: guest at the house party, works at the Foreign Office for George Lomax.
- Ronny Devereux: guest at the house party, later murdered.
- Gerald Wade: guest at the house party, later murdered.
- Loraine Wade: his stepsister.
- Jimmy Thesiger: guest at the house party and later at Wyvern Abbey, and man about town; a murderer and thief.
- Stevens: Jimmy’s manservant.
- Clement Edward Alistair Brent, 9th Marquis of Caterham: Father of Bundle, owner of Chimneys.
- Lady Eileen "Bundle" Brent: his daughter and a sometime amateur detective.
- Superintendent Battle: from Scotland Yard.
- Alfred: former footman at Chimneys, now working at Seven Dials night club.
- John Bauer: His replacement at Chimneys.
- George Lomax: Under-secretary for State for Foreign Affairs, host at Wyvern Abbey.
- Sir Stanley Digby: Air Minister for the British government, guest at Wyvern Abbey.
- Terence O’Rourke: guest at the party at Wyvern Abbey; secretary to Sir Stanley.
- Countess Radzky: guest at Wyvern Abbey, revealed later as the New York actress Babe St Maur.
- Herr Eberhard: German inventor.
- Mr Mosgorovsky: owner of the Seven Dials night club, and a member of the group.
- Count Andras and Hayward Phelps: members of the Seven Dials group.

== Literary significance and reception ==
The review in the Times Literary Supplement issue of 4 April 1929 was for once markedly unenthusiastic about a Christie book: "It is a great pity that Mrs Christie should in this, as in a previous book, have deserted the methodical procedure of inquiry into a single and circumscribed crime for the romance of universal conspiracy and international rogues. These Gothic romances are not to be despised but they are so different in kind from the story of strict detection that it is unlikely for anyone to be adept in both. Mrs Christie lacks the haphazard and credulous romanticism which makes the larger canvas of more extensive crime successful. In such a performance bravura rather than precision is essential. The mystery of Seven Dials and of the secret society which met in that sinister district requires precisely such a broad treatment, but Mrs Christie gives to it that minute study which she employed so skilfully in her earlier books." The review concluded: "There is no particular reason why the masked man should be the particular person he turns out to be".

The review in The New York Times Book Review of 7 April 1929 began: "After reading the opening chapters of this book one anticipates an unusually entertaining yarn. There are some very jolly young people in it, and the fact that they become involved in a murder mystery does not dampen their spirits to any great extent." The uncredited reviewer set up the plot regarding Gerald Wade being found dead and then said: "Thus far the story is excellent; indeed it continues to promise well until the time comes when the mystery is to be solved. Then it is seen that the author has been so keen on preventing the reader from guessing the solution that she has rather overstepped the bounds of what should be permitted to a writer of detective stories. She has held out information which the reader should have had, and, not content with scattering false clues with a lavish hand, she has carefully avoided leaving any clues pointing to the real criminal. Worst of all, the solution itself is utterly preposterous. This book is far below the standard set by Agatha Christie's earlier stories."

The Scotsman of 28 January 1929 said: "Less good in point of style than some of her earlier novels, The Seven Dials Mystery ... maintains the author's reputation of ingenuity." The review went on to say that "It is an unusual feature of this story that at the end, the reader will want to go back over the story to see if he has had a square deal from the author. On the whole he has."

Robert Barnard noted that this novel had the "Same characters and setting with Chimneys" and then concluded his view of it by adding "but without the same verve and cheek".

== Publication history ==
The first UK edition retailed at seven shillings and sixpence (7/6) and the US edition at $2.00.

- 1929, William Collins and Sons (London), 24 January 1929, Hardback, 282 pp
- 1929, Dodd Mead and Company (New York), 1929, Hardback, 310 pp
- 1932, William Collins and Sons, February 1932 (As part of the Agatha Christie Omnibus of Crime along with The Murder of Roger Ackroyd, The Mystery of the Blue Train and The Sittaford Mystery), Hardback (Priced at seven shillings and sixpence)
- 1948, Penguin Books, Paperback, (Penguin number 687), 247 pp
- 1954, Fontana Books (Imprint of HarperCollins), Paperback, 189 pp
- 1957, Avon Books (New York), Paperback
- 1962, Pan Books, Paperback (Great Pan 571), 207 pp
- 1964, Bantam Books (New York), Paperback, 184 pp
- 2010, HarperCollins; Facsimile edition, Hardcover: 288 pages, ISBN 978-0-00-735458-0

In her autobiography, Christie states that this book was what she called “the light-hearted thriller type”. She went on to say that they were always easy to write as they didn’t require too much plotting or planning, presumably in contrast to the very-tightly planned detective stories. She called this era her “plutocratic” period in that she was starting to receive sums for American serialisation rights which both exceeded what she earned in the UK for such rights and was, at this time, free of income tax. She compared this period favourably with the time at which she wrote these comments (1950s to 1960s) when she was plagued with income tax problems which lasted for some twenty years and ate up most of what people presumed was a large fortune.

=== Dustjacket blurb ===
The blurb of the first edition (which is carried on both the back of the dustjacket and opposite the title page) reads:

When Gerald Wade died, apparently from an overdose of sleeping draught, seven clocks appeared on the mantelpiece. Who put them there and had they any connection with the Night Club in Seven Dials? That is the mystery that Bill Eversleigh and Bundle and two other young people set out to investigate. Their investigations lead them into some queer places and more than once into considerable danger. Not till the very end of the book is the identity of the mysterious Seven o’clock revealed.

== Adaptations ==
=== 1981 television film ===
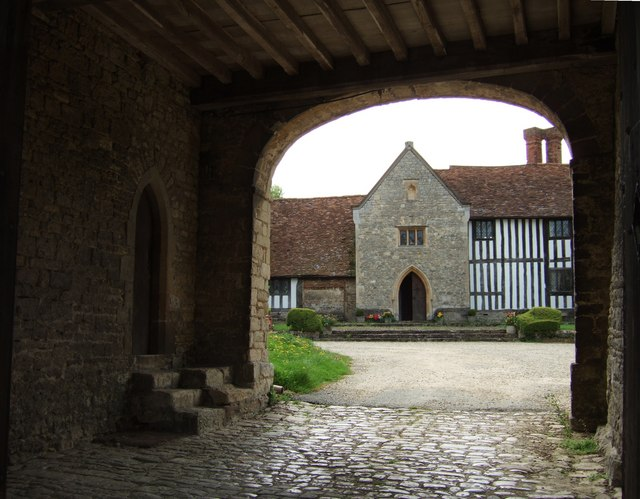
Long Crendon Manor in Buckinghamshire doubled as Chimneys.

Following the success of their version of Why Didn't They Ask Evans in 1980, The Seven Dials Mystery was adapted by London Weekend Television as a 140-minute television film and transmitted on Sunday 8 March 1981. The same team of Pat Sandys, Tony Wharmby and Jack Williams worked on the production which again starred John Gielgud and James Warwick. Cheryl Campbell also starred as "Bundle" Brent. The production was very faithful to the book with no major deviations to the plot (other than that the "big reveal" in the television version was split between several characters instead of being given almost wholly to Superintendent Battle) or characters (except that Countess Radzsky, instead of being revealed to be the New York actress Babe St Maur, was said to be a cousin of Ronnie Devereux's, the talented actress Barbara St Maur).

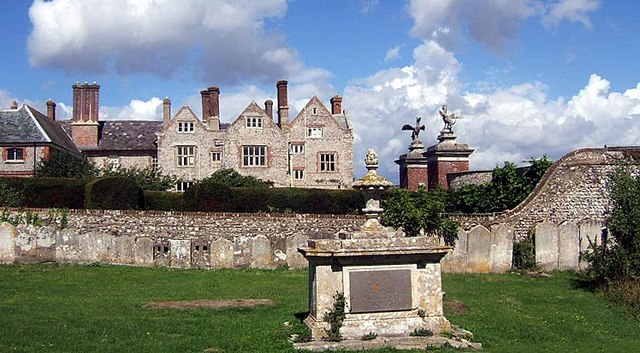
Glynde Place in East Sussex doubled as Wyvern Abbey.

This second success of adapting an Agatha Christie book led to the same company commissioning The Secret Adversary and Agatha Christie's Partners in Crime for their 1983 transmission.

The production was first screened on US television as part of Mobil Showcase in April 1981.

- Adaptor: Pat Sandys
- Executive Producer: Tony Wharmby
- Producer: Jack Williams
- Director: Tony Wharmby

==== Cast ====
- John Gielgud as Marquess of Caterham
- Harry Andrews as Superintendent Battle
- Cheryl Campbell as Lady Eileen 'Bundle' Brent
- James Warwick as Jimmy Thesiger
- Terence Alexander as George Lomax
- Christopher Scoular as Bill Eversleigh
- Lucy Gutteridge as Lorraine Wade
- Leslie Sands as Sir Oswald Coote
- Joyce Redman as Lady Coote
- Brian Wilde as Tredwell
- Rula Lenska as Countess Radzsky
- Noel Johnson as Sir Stanley Digby
- Robert Longden as Gerry Wade
- John Vine as Ronny Devereux
- James Griffiths as Rupert 'Pongo' Bateman
- Hetty Baynes as Vera
- Sarah Crowden as Helen
- Lynne Ross as Nancy
- Thom Delaney as Terence O'Rourke
- Norwich Duff as Howard Phelps
- Sandor Elès as Count Andras
- Douglas W. Iles as John Bauer
- Charles Morgan as Dr. Cartwright
- John Price as Alfred
- Roger Sloman as Stevens
- Jacob Witkin as Mr. Mosgorovsky

=== 2026 Netflix television series ===
A Netflix adaptation titled Agatha Christie's Seven Dials was released on 15 January 2026. The series stars Mia McKenna-Bruce as Bundle, Helena Bonham Carter as Lady Caterham, and Martin Freeman as Battle.
