= Shindig =

Shindig may refer to:

- The Shindig, a 1930 Mickey Mouse cartoon
- "Shindig" (song), a 1963 instrumental by the Shadows
- "Shindig" (Firefly), a 2002 television episode
- Shindig!, a 1964–1966 American music variety television show
- Shindig! (magazine), a British monthly music magazine since 1992

== See also ==
- Shindiggers, a 1983–1987 Australian beat music band
