= List of English words of Irish origin =

This is a list of English words derived from the Irish language.

== B ==
banshee
A mythical being (from bean sídhe, "fairy woman").
bog
A piece of wet spongy ground (from bogach, "bog", from bog, "soft").
boreen
A country lane (from bóithrín, diminutive of bóthar, "road").
bother
Possibly from bodhar, "deaf, bothered, confused", or from bodhraigh, "to deafen, to annoy". The earliest use appears in the writings of Irish authors Sheridan, Swift and Sterne.
brock
A badger (from broc, "badger", or a cognate thereof).
brat
A dialectal word for an overall or apron (from brat, "cloth").
brogan
A kind of shoe (from brógan, diminutive of bróg, "shoe").
brogue
A kind of shoe (from bróg, "shoe").

== C ==
char
A kind of fish. Possibly from ce(a)ra, "[blood] red", referring to its pink-red underside. This would also connect with its Welsh name torgoch, "red belly."
clabber, clauber
Wet clay or mud; curdled milk (from clábar).
clock
O.Ir. clocc meaning "bell"; into Old High German as glocka, klocka (whence Modern German Glocke) and back into English via Flemish; cf also Welsh cloch but the giving language is Old Irish via the handbells used by early Irish missionaries.
colleen
A girl, especially an Irish one (from cailín, "young woman").
craic
Fun, used in Ireland for fun/enjoyment. The word is actually English in origin; it entered into Irish from the English "crack" via Ulster Scots. The Gaelicised spelling craic was then reborrowed into English. The craic spelling, although preferred by many Irish people, has garnered some criticism as a faux-Irish word.
cross
The ultimate source of this word is Latin crux, the Roman gibbet which became a symbol of Christianity. Some sources say the English wordform comes from Old Irish cros. Other sources say the English comes from Old French crois and others say it comes from Old Norse kross.

== D ==
drisheen
A kind of sausage (from drisín, "intestine").
dulse
An edible species of seaweed (from duileasc).

== E ==
esker
An elongated mound of post-glacial gravel (from eiscir).

== F ==
Fenian
A member of a 19th-century Irish nationalist group (from Féni, a name for the people of Ireland).
fiacre
A small four-wheeled carriage for hire, a hackney-coach. Saint Fiacre was a seventh-century Irish-born saint who lived in France for most of his life. The English word fiacre comes from French.

== G ==
Gallowglass
A Scottish mercenary in Ireland (from gallóglach, "foreign warrior").
galore
In abundance (from go leór, "sufficiently, enough").
gob
A mouth (from gob, "mouth, beak").

== H ==
hooligan
One who takes part in rowdy behaviour and vandalism. Possibly from the Irish surname Hooligan, an anglicisation of Ó hUallacháin.

== K ==
keening
Lamentation (from caoin, "to lament").
kibosh
Possibly from caidhp bháis, "cap of death", in reference either to the black cap worn by a judge when pronouncing a death sentence or to the gruesome method of execution called pitchcapping. Yiddish and Turkish etymologies have also been put forward.

== L ==
leprechaun
A mythical being (from luchorpán, "small body").
limerick
A kind of poem (from the place-name Limerick, an anglicisation of Luimneach).
lough
A lake, or arm of the sea (from loch).

== P ==
phoney
Fake. Probably from the English fawney meaning "gilt brass ring used by swindlers", which is from Irish fáinne meaning "ring".
poteen
Hooch, bootleg alcohol (from póitín).

== S ==
shamrock
A clover, used as a symbol for Ireland (from seamróg).
Shan Van Vocht
A literary name for Ireland in the 18th and 19th centuries (from sean-bhean bhocht, "poor old woman").
shebeen
An unlicensed house selling alcohol (possibly from siopaín, diminutive of siopa, "shop").
shillelagh
A wooden club or cudgel made from a stout knotty stick with a large knob on the end (from sail éille meaning "a club with a strap").
Sidhe
The fairy folk of Ireland, from (aos) sídhe. See banshee.
sleveen, sleiveen
An untrustworthy or cunning person (from slíghbhín/slíbhín). Used in Ireland and Newfoundland (OED).
slew
A great amount (from sluagh, "a large number") .
slob
Mud (from slab). Note: the English words slobber and slobbery do not come from this; they come from Old English.
smithereens
Small fragments, atoms. In phrases such as "to explode into smithereens". This is the word smithers (of obscure origin) with the Irish diminutive ending. Whether it derives from the modern Irish smidrín or is the source of this word is unclear.

== T ==
tilly
Used to refer to an additional article or amount unpaid for by the purchaser, as a gift from the vendor (from tuilleadh, "supplement") . Perhaps more prevalent in Newfoundland than Ireland. James Joyce, in his Pomes Penyeach included a thirteenth poem as a bonus (as the book sold for a shilling, twelve poems would have come to a penny each), which he named "Tilly", for the extra sup of milk given to customers by milkmen in Dublin.
Tory
Originally an Irish outlaw, probably from the Irish verb tóir meaning "pursue".
turlough
A seasonal lake (from tur loch, "dry lake").

== W ==
whiskey
An alcoholic drink (from uisce beatha, "water of life").

== See also ==
- Hiberno-English
- List of English words of Scottish Gaelic origin
- Lists of English words of Celtic origin
- Lists of English words of international origin
