= The Secret of Chimneys =

1925 mystery novel by Agatha Christie

- First edition
- Author: Agatha Christie
- Cover artist: Percy Graves
- Language: English
- Series: Superintendent Battle
- Genre: Crime
- Publisher: Bodley Head
- Publication date: June 1925
- Publication place: United Kingdom
- Media type: Print (hardback & paperback)
- Pages: 310 (first edition, hardback)
- Followed by: The Seven Dials Mystery

The Secret of Chimneys is a mystery novel by British writer Agatha Christie, first published in the UK by The Bodley Head in June 1925 and in the US by Dodd, Mead and Company later in the same year. It introduces the characters of Superintendent Battle and Lady Eileen "Bundle" Brent. The UK edition retailed at seven shillings and sixpence (7/6) and the US edition at $2.00.

At the request of George Lomax, Lord Caterham reluctantly agrees to host a weekend party at his home, Chimneys. A murder occurs in the house, beginning a week of fast-paced events with police among the guests.

The novel was well received at first publication, described as more than a murder mystery, as it is a treasure hunt. Later reviews found it a first-class romp and one of the author's best early thrillers.

== Plot summary ==
When they meet up in Bulawayo, Anthony Cade agrees to take on two jobs for his friend James McGrath. Anthony heads for London to deliver the draft of a memoir to a publisher, who has pledged to pay £1,000 if it is delivered by a certain date; and to return a packet of compromising letters to the woman who wrote them. In England, politician George Lomax persuades Lord Caterham to host a house party at Chimneys. George's cousin Virginia Revel is invited, as is Hiram Fish, a collector of first edition books, along with the principals in a political scheme to restore the monarchy in Herzoslovakia – while assuring that newly discovered oil there will be handled by a British syndicate.

On Cade's first day in London, he is approached by two Herzoslovakian men who try to acquire the manuscript. The first, a Count supporting the Royalist faction, tries to buy the manuscript, offering to outbid the publisher, to suppress any embarrassing information it might contain; Cade politely but firmly refuses. The second, a member of a violent revolutionary group, demands Cade hand it over at gunpoint; Cade disarms the man and sends him away. Later that night, Cade discovers his waiter sneaking into his hotel room; the waiter escapes with the packet of letters. The publisher calls Cade the next day, telling him that their employee Mr Holmes will arrive to pick up the memoir. This was written by the late Count Stylptitch of Herzoslovakia; now that oil has been discovered, the nation is in turmoil between republicans and royalists. On advice, Cade puts a dummy package in the hotel safe.

The thief brings one letter to Virginia Revel at her home, as it is her name signed to each letter. Unaware she did not write the letters, and that her husband is dead, he attempts to blackmail her. On a whim, she pays some money, and promises more the next day. When she arrives home the next day, she finds him shot dead in her house, and Anthony Cade on her door step. Cade removes the body, dumping it along a road in the country and hiding the gun up a tree, to avoid a scandal and allow Virginia to proceed to Chimneys.

At Chimneys, Prince Michael, heir apparent to the vacant throne of Herzoslovakia, is killed the night of his arrival. Cade was at Chimneys that same evening, leaving footprints outdoors but not indoors. He boldly introduces himself to Superintendent Battle, explaining the story of the memoirs, and persuading Battle of his innocence in the murder. After seeing that the dead prince is the same man as "Mr Holmes", Cade pursues his own ideas in finding the murderer, while Battle leads the main investigation. The next heir to the throne, Nicholas, cousin to Michael, was raising money on his expectations in America. Cade checks out the governess, a recent addition to the household; he travels to France to speak with her prior employer.

The Koh-i-Noor diamond had been stolen from the Tower of London and replaced by a paste copy some years earlier, by a French jewel thief named King Victor. Chimneys is one place where it may be hidden, though many searches have not found it. King Victor was released from prison in France a few months earlier, so Battle expects he will seek to recover it. The night Cade is in France, there is a break-in at Chimneys. Virginia Revel hears the noise, and sees one or two men taking old armour apart. She and Bill Eversleigh do not catch the thief. The next night, the three wait for a second attempt; they catch M. Lemoine of the Sûreté, on the track of King Victor. Battle has been waiting for him. The stolen letters reappear in Cade's room. It is revealed the letters were coded messages written to King Victor by an accomplice. Battle realizes the thieves want him to decode the letter that points to the location of the stolen gem. This is done, revealing the clue: "Richmond seven straight eight left three right". Battle follows the Richmond clue to a brick in a hidden passage, which in turn reveals a puzzling conundrum. Cade slips out to Dover, to find an address on a slip of paper given him by Boris Anchoukoff, valet to the late prince. He finds the meeting of King Victor's gang; Hiram Fish, really a Pinkerton detective on the thief's trail for his crimes in America; and the real M Lemoine tied up as a hostage.

At Chimneys, all are gathered to hear the mysteries explained. In the library, Boris finds Miss Brun with a pistol, attempting to get the jewel. They struggle; the gun goes off in her hand, killing her. Miss Brun had killed Prince Michael, because he had recognized her as someone else. She was the last queen consort of Herzoslovakia, thought to have been murdered with her husband in the revolution; but she escaped. She wrote the coded letters to Captain O'Neill, an alias of King Victor, and signed them with the name of Virginia Revel, who had been living in Herzoslovakia with her husband, a British diplomat. Cade introduces the real M Lemoine to the group, while Hiram Fish snares King Victor, who has been posing as the French detective and in America as Nicholas. Anthony Cade gave "Mr Holmes" the dummy package; he gives the real memoirs to Jimmy McGrath to earn his £1000. Cade and Fish solve the conundrum; it points to a rose bush on the grounds, where the Koh-i-Noor is subsequently recovered. Anthony presents himself as the missing Prince Nicholas, ready to ally with the British syndicate. He offers himself as Herzoslovakia's next king. Earlier that day, he married Virginia, who will be his queen.

== Characters ==
(Other identities assumed by characters in the course of the novel are given in [square brackets]).

Inhabitants of "Chimneys" and guests at the house party

- Clement Edward Alistair Brent, 9th Marquis of Caterham, Lord Caterham
- Lady Eileen "Bundle" Brent, eldest daughter of Lord Caterham
- Virginia Revel, cousin of George Lomax, daughter of a peer, society beauty and young widow of Timothy Revel, former British envoy to Herzoslovakia; she is 27 years old.
- Hiram P Fish, collector of first editions, invited to the house party by Lord Caterham [an American agent on the trail of King Victor]
- Herman Isaacstein, financier of a British oil syndicate
- Tredwell, the butler
- Miss Genevieve Brun, French governess for Lady Eileen's two younger sisters Dulcie and Daisy [former Queen Varaga of Herzoslovakia]

Friends in South Africa

- Anthony Cade, British-educated adventurer, down on his luck when the novel opens; 32 years old, and 14 years since he was last in England.
- James McGrath, Canadian man always seeking gold, asked to deliver a package to London

British Government

- The Honourable George Lomax, of the Foreign Office
- Bill Eversleigh, works for George Lomax and is one of the house party

Herzoslovakians

- Prince Michael Obolovitch of Herzoslovakia [Mr Holmes from Balderson and Hodgkins, publishers] [Count Stanislaus], second murder victim
- Captain Andrassy, his equerry
- Boris Anchoukoff, his valet
- Baron Lolopretjzyl, London representative of the Loyalist Party of Herzoslovakia
- Prince Nicholas Obolovitch of Herzoslovakia [Anthony Cade, adventurer] [James McGrath], raised and educated in England
- Dutch Pedro, an agent of the "Comrades of the Red Hand"

Police and criminal investigators

- Inspector Badgworthy, local police.
- Colonel Melrose, Chief Constable.
- Dr Cartwright, pathologist.
- Constable Johnson, newest addition to the local police, brother of the local railway porter, thus aware of all arrivals and departures by train.
- Superintendent Battle of Scotland Yard, always on the spot.
- Monsieur Lemoine of the Sûreté, French detective also in pursuit of King Victor.
- Professor Wynwood, decoder.

Others

- Giuseppe Manelli, Italian waiter at the Blitz Hotel, thief and blackmailer, first murder victim
- King Victor, international jewel thief recently released from prison in France [Monsieur Chelles, guest at local inn, The Cricketers] [Monsieur Lemoine of the Sûreté] [Captain O'Neill] [Prince Nicholas Obolovitch of Herzoslovakia in America], a man quite proud of his skills in thievery and disguise, voiced in his role as M Lemoine; wanted by three nations
- Angèle Mory, former dancer at the Folies Bergère, jewel thief with King Victor's gang, later Queen Varaga of Herzoslovakia [Miss Brun, French governess to the Brent girls]. She murdered Prince Michael, and was killed by her own gun in the struggle with Boris.

== Literary significance and reception ==
The Times Literary Supplement reviewed the novel in its issue of 9 July 1925 and, after setting up the story, stated favourably that "there is ... a thick fog of mystery, cross-purposes and romance, which leads up to a most unexpected and highly satisfactory ending".

The reviewer for The Observer wrote on 28 June 1925: "Mrs Christie plunges lightheartedly into a real welter of murders, innocently-implicated lookers-on, Balkan politics (of the lighter Ruritanian kind), impersonators, secret societies, ciphers, experts, secret hiding-places, detectives (real and pretended), and emerges triumphantly at the end, before her readers are too hopelessly befogged. Nobody is killed who matters much. The right people marry, after it all, having first endeared themselves to us by their frivolous attitude to the singularly animated doings around them." The reviewer concluded that Christie's "ingenuity and clear-headedness are really remarkable."

The review in The Scotsman of 16 July 1925 began, "Despite Herzoslovakian politics and a background of oil and finance, this new novel by Agatha Christie gets a grip of the reader when it comes down to the business of disposing of a corpse, innocently come by but not to be repudiated without danger of grave scandal" and went on to say, "It is an exciting story with a bewildering array of potential murderers and a curious collection of detectives, amateur and professional, and with a crook of international importance and (alleged) consummate ability." The review concluded: "There is more than murder in this story; there is a treasure hunt in it, not for gold but a diamond, and the story is suitably staged for the main part at Chimneys, that historic mansion whose secret will be found in Chapter XXIX, though the wise in these matters may have discovered it a little earlier".

Robert Barnard said it is important to remember when this novel was written "If you can take all of the racialist remarks, which are very much of their time, this is a first-class romp, all the better for not being of the 'plot to take over the world' variety. It concerns the throne and crown jewels of Herzoslovakia, and combines such Hope-ful [sic] elements with bright young things and some effective caricatures." His final decision on the novel overall was that it was "By far the least awful of the early thrillers."

Charles Osborne: "The Secret of Chimneys is one of the best of Agatha Christie's early thrillers (...). Her attitude to democracy is so unsympathetic, at least as expressed by a character of whom Mrs Christie evidently approves, that it reveals an unexpectedly authoritarian aspect of the author's nature".

In his analysis of Christie's Notebooks published in 2010 and 2012, Christie expert and archivist John Curran wrote that "a hefty suspension of disbelief is called for if some aspects of the plot are to be accepted." Curran considered the novel an "enjoyable but preposterous romp ... littered with loose ends, unlikely motivations and unconvincing characters" and regarded Christie's The Man in the Brown Suit and The Seven Dials Mystery "if not more credible, at least far less incredible" than Chimneys.

== References and allusions ==
=== References to actual places ===
The Blitz Hotel is in part a reference to London's Ritz Hotel, though the location of the Blitz matches that of the Savoy Hotel, where César Ritz had been manager, and which is close to the Embankment. Christie uses the same location (and the same name for it) in the 1924 short stories Blindman's Buff and The Man Who Was No. 16, which later formed part of the 1929 collection Partners in Crime.

=== References in other works ===
The fictional country of Herzoslovakia makes a return appearance in the short story The Stymphalean Birds which was first published in the April 1940 issue of the Strand Magazine and later appeared in the 1947 collection The Labours of Hercules. It is also briefly mentioned in the 1940 novel One, Two, Buckle My Shoe.

Christie later used the "Chimneys" mansion, along with the characters of Bill Eversleigh, Bundle Brent, George Lomax, Tredwell, and Lord Caterham from this book, in the 1929 novel The Seven Dials Mystery.

=== Allusions to real events ===
The novel was written in 1925. The characters in the story refer to events that occurred about 7 years earlier, that is, at the end of the Great War when Austria-Hungary and the Ottoman Empire were broken up. The war is never mentioned directly. Instead, in Chapter 19, Superintendent Battle says: "Just over seven years ago, there was a lot what they called reconstruction going on especially in the Near East." At the same time, many royal persons were in England, including the Queen of Herzoslovakia, and Count Stylptitch; all the Balkan states were interested parties in discussions taking place. It is at this time that the Koh-i-noor diamond disappeared in the plot. Later, in an unspecified year, the Herzoslovakians rose up against the king and his commoner wife. About that time, Mrs Virginia Revel and her husband Tim were part of the diplomatic mission from the UK to Herzoslovakia, so that Mrs Revel had met Prince Michael; she was the only such person at the house party, to know Prince Michael, but not the only person in the house. The time immediately after the war was when the theft, solved in this novel, happened.

== Publication history ==
- 1925, John Lane (The Bodley Head), June 1925, Hardback, 310 pp
- 1925, Dodd Mead and Company (New York), Hardback, 310 pp
- 1947, Dell Books (New York), Paperback (Dell mapback number 199), 224 pp
- 1956, Pan Books, 1956, Paperback (Pan number 366), 222 pp
- 1958, Pan Books, 1958, Paperback (Great Pan G106)
- 1958, The Bodley Head, 1958, Hardback, 224 pp
- 1978, Panther Books, 1978, Paperback, 224 pp
- 1989, Fontana Books (Imprint of HarperCollins), 1989, Paperback, 272 pp
- 2007, Facsimile of 1925 UK first edition (HarperCollins), 5 November 2007, Hardcover, ISBN 0-00-726521-2

This was the last novel published under Christie's six-book contract with the Bodley Head which had been agreed back in 1919. Christie had signed without literary agent representation and had come to resent its terms which she stated were unfair. Her future books in the UK were all published by William Collins & Sons (with the sole exception of The Hound of Death) once a new and more favourable contract had been signed with them by her newly appointed agent, Edmund Cork of Hughes Massey. Cork became a lifelong friend.

This novel was much admired by her future mother-in-law, Mrs Marguerite Mallowan, who penned a note in a leather-bound copy she commissioned of this book together with The Murder of Roger Ackroyd and The Hollow. The note read "Passing a bookshop while I was in Paris in 1932, I bought The Secret of Chimneys, now almost unobtainable. I had just heard of Agatha Christie. Though not a reader of detective stories, her book captivated me so much that I never left it until I had finished it. Soon after she married my son, whom she had met in Mesopotamia while he was working under Sir Leonard Woolley. Later I read The Murder of Roger Ackroyd which, I think, made her reputation universal. Lastly came The Hollow, a book dear to me as revealing her artistic, simple and sincere temperament. This is the reason for my choice of these three books to be bound together. I wish them to be a testimony of my admiration for her art, and above all, of my gratitude for her loving kindness through all the years I have known her". The copy of the book was sold at auction in September 2006.

=== Book dedication ===
In the Bantam edition, the dedication is to "Punkie", who is Madge, Christie's older sister. In other editions the dedication reads:

"To my Nephew. In memory of an inscription at Compton Castle and a day at the Zoo."

The "nephew" was Jack Watts (1903–1961), the son of Christie's brother-in-law and sister James and 'Madge' Watts. Christie became very close to her nephew after his birth when she was thirteen and joined her mother in looking after him at his home, Abney Hall, when her sister and brother-in-law went on skiing holidays to St Moritz and at Christmas. She writes enthusiastically about her memories of this time in the foreword to her 1960 collection of short stories The Adventure of the Christmas Pudding. The references to Compton Castle and the zoo are obscure. It is possible that the house "Chimneys" is based on Compton Castle, but Abney Hall is equally probable. Christie gives no description of “Chimneys” in the book, merely stating that "Descriptions of that historic place can be found in any guidebook.”

=== Dustjacket blurb ===
The dustjacket front flap of the first edition carried no specially written blurb. Instead, both the front and back flap carried advertisements for Christie's five other Bodley Head books together with one or two short quotes from reviews of those books.

=== International titles ===
This novel has been translated to various languages other than its original English. At least seventeen languages are known to have translated versions of this novel, some published as recently as 2014 and 2015. This is in keeping with the author's reputation for being the most translated author.

== Film, TV or theatrical adaptations ==
=== Stage adaptation (1931) ===
The Secret of Chimneys was adapted by Christie into a stage play in 1931 but its planned performance was cancelled. Nonetheless, a copy was placed in the British Library where it was located and a copy provided to Christie's daughter, at whose request its existence was not revealed publicly. Twenty years later, another copy surfaced in Canada, where it received its world premiere on 16 October 2003.

=== The Secret of Chimneys, ITV (2010) ===
The programme was included in the fifth series of Marple, with Julia McKenzie as the lead. It uses the house Chimneys as the setting and includes some of the original characters, however it bears little resemblance to the original story. Miss Marple is inserted as the main detective and features elements from the Miss Marple short story, "The Herb of Death". The Radio Times observed that this production was "classic Agatha Christie, even though it's only distantly related to her original ... purists will be utterly flummoxed – and the plot has more holes in it than the murder victim".

Its cast includes Edward Fox as Lord Caterham, Anthony Higgins as Count Ludwig, Jonas Armstrong as Anthony Cade, Charlotte Salt as Virginia Revel and Dervla Kirwan as Bundle.

=== Graphic novel adaptation (2007) ===
The Secret of Chimneys was released by HarperCollins as a graphic novel adaptation on 20 August 2007, adapted by François Rivière and illustrated by Laurence Suhner (ISBN 0-00-725059-2). This was translated from the edition first published in France by Emmanuel Proust éditions in 2002 under the title of Le Secret de Chimneys.
