= Inglenook (disambiguation) =

An inglenook (Modern Scots ingleneuk), or chimney corner, is a small recess that adjoins a fireplace.

Inglenook may also refer to:

- Inglenook, California, community in Mendocino County
- Inglenook (winery), vineyards and winery in Rutherford, Napa County, California
- Inglenook Sidings, a railway shunting puzzle
- Inglenook Community School, an alternative high school in Toronto, Ontario, Canada
- Inglenook, Pennsylvania, an unincorporated community

Chimney Corner may also refer to:

- Chimney Corner, West Virginia in Fayette County, United States
- Chimney Corner, Nova Scotia in Inverness County, Canada
- Chimney Corner F.C., a football (soccer) club in Northern Ireland
