= Agatha Christie's Great Detectives Poirot and Marple =

Anime television series

アガサ·クリスティーの名探偵ポワロとマープル (Agasa Kurisutī no Meitantei Powaro to Māpuru)
- Genre: Detective fiction
- Anime television series
- Directed by: Naohito Takahashi
- Studio: Oriental Light and Magic
- Original network: NHK General TV
- Original run: 4 July 2004 – 15 May 2005
- Episodes: 39
- Manga
- Written by: Yukiyoshi Oohashi; Shōji Yonemura
- Illustrated by: Morihiko Ishikawa
- Published by: NHK Publishing
- Original run: August 2004 – May 2005
- Volumes: 3

Agatha Christie's Great Detectives Poirot and Marple (アガサ·クリスティーの名探偵ポワロとマープル, Agasa Kurisutī no Meitantei Powaro to Māpuru) is a Japanese anime television series that adapted several Agatha Christie stories about Hercule Poirot and Miss Marple. A new character named Maybelle West, Miss Marple's great-niece, who becomes Poirot's junior assistant, is used to connect the two detectives.

The series was broadcast from 4 July 2004 to 15 May 2005 on NHK, and continues to be shown in re-runs on NHK and other networks in Japan. The series was adapted as manga under the same title, which was released in 2004 and 2005.

== Adaptation ==
The TV series is a generally faithful adaptation of the original stories given the time constraints (typically one 25-minute episode for a short story, four episodes for a novel). Despite being a modern Japanese adaptation, the original (mainly English) locations and time period are retained. The most obvious story change is the addition of Mabel West and her pet duck, Oliver. However, apart from her soliloquies, most of her lines are taken from the incidental dialogue of other characters in the original stories, so her presence does not materially alter the plot development.

Other changes include Inspector Japp becoming "Inspector Sharpe", possibly due to the derogatory implications attached to the word "jap". The significance of some details which rely on English idioms is changed, for example when a dying uncle taps his eye in Strange Jest, this was originally a reference to the saying All my eye and Betty Martin, but in the anime it becomes a reference to a stamp in which an angel appears to be winking (however the clue still achieves the same end).

== Characters ==
- Hercule Poirot: Voiced by: Kōtarō Satomi
- Jane Marple: Voiced by: Kaoru Yachigusa
- Mabel West: Voiced by: Fumiko Orikasa
- Oliver: Voiced by: Masako Jou
- Miss Lemon: Voiced by: Atsuko Tanaka
- Hastings: Voiced by: Hirofumi Nojima
- Inspector Sharpe: Voiced by: Yuusaku Yara

== Media ==
=== Anime ===
The anime was produced by Oriental Light and Magic for NHK. The series was directed by Naohito Takahashi with music by Toshiyuki Watanabe and character designs by Sayuri Ichiishi. The opening theme is "Lucky Girl ni Hanataba wo" and the ending theme is "Wasurenaide," both performed by Tatsuro Yamashita. The 39 episodes were initially broadcast in Japan on NHK stations from 4 July 2004 to 15 May 2005. The series was released on seven DVDs.

#	Title	Original release date
1	"The Jewel Robbery at the Grand Metropolitan" "Gurando-Metoroporitan no Hōseki Tōnan Jiken" (Japanese: グランド·メトロポリタンの宝石盗難事件)	4 July 2004
The Jewel Robbery at the Grand Metropolitan (Poirot Investigates, 1924)
2	"The Riddle of the Cheap Flat" "Yasu Manshon no Nazo" (Japanese: 安マンションの謎)	18 July 2004
Original title: The Adventure of the Cheap Flat (Poirot Investigates, 1924)
3	"Strange Will" "Fūgawari na Yuigon" (Japanese: 風変わりな遺言)	25 July 2004
Original title: Strange Jest
4	"The Faultless Maid" "Mōshibun no nai Meido" (Japanese: 申し分のないメイド)	1 August 2004
Original title: The Case of the Perfect Maid
5	"The ABC Murders, Part 1: A Written Challenge to Poirot" "Ēbīshī Satsujin Jiken (sono ichi) Powaro e no Chōsenjō" (Japanese: ABC殺人事件,(その1)ポワロへの挑戦状)	8 August 2004
6	"The ABC Murders, Part 2: B's the place, B's the name of the person" "Ēbīshī Satsujin Jiken (sono ni) Bī no Machi de, Bī no Na no Hito ga" (Japanese: ABC殺人事件,(その2)Bの街で、Bの名の人が)	15 August 2004
7	"The ABC Murders, Part 3: The Culprit Appears" "Ēbīshī Satsujin Jiken (sono san) Hannin Arawaru" (Japanese: ABC殺人事件,(その3)犯人あらわる)	22 August 2004
8	"The ABC Murders, Part 4: Poirot Solves the Mystery" "Ēbīshī Satsujin Jiken (sono yon) Powaro, Nazo o Toku" (Japanese: ABC殺人事件,(その4)ポワロ、謎を解く)	29 August 2004
The ABC Murders (1936)
9	"The Prime Minister's Disappearance, Part 1: Pursuit in the Dover Strait" "Sōridaijin no Shissō (zenpen) Dōbā-kaikyō no Tsuiseki" (Japanese: 総理大臣の失踪,(前編)ドーバー海峡の追跡)	5 September 2004
10	"The Prime Minister's Disappearance, Part 2: The Truth is in England" "Sōridaijin no Shissō (kōhen) Shinjitsu wa Igirisu ni" (Japanese: 総理大臣の失踪,(後編)真実はイギリスに)	12 September 2004
The Kidnapped Prime Minister (Poirot Investigates, 1924)
11	"The Riddle of the Egyptian Tomb, Part 1: A Written Challenge from Ancient Times" "Ejiputo-funbo no Nazo (zenpen) Kodai kara no Chōsenjō" (Japanese: エジプト墳墓の謎,(前編)古代からの挑戦状)	19 September 2004
12	"The Riddle of the Egyptian Tomb, Part 2: The Curse of Pharaoh Men-her-Ra" "Ejiputo-funbo no Nazo (kōhen) Menhāra-Ō no Noroi" (Japanese: エジプト墳墓の謎,(後編)メンハーラ王の呪い)	26 September 2004
The Adventure of the Egyptian Tomb (Poirot Investigates, 1924)
13	"Tape-Measure Murder" "Makijaku Satsujin Jiken" (Japanese: 巻尺殺人事件)	3 October 2004
The Tape-Measure Murder
14	"The Case of the Gold Ingots" "Kinkai Jiken" (Japanese: 金塊事件)	10 October 2004
Ingots of Gold (The Thirteen Problems, 1932)
15	"The Blue Geranium" "Aoi Zeraniumu" (Japanese: 青いゼラニウム)	17 October 2004
The Blue Geranium (The Thirteen Problems, 1932)
16	"The Mystery of End House, Part 1: The Night of the Party" "Endo Hausu Kai Jiken (sono ichi) Pātī no Yoru ni" (Japanese: エンド·ハウス怪事件,(その1)パーティーの夜に)	14 November 2004
17	"The Mystery of End House, Part 2: Concealed Love" "Endo Hausu Kai Jiken (sono ni) Himerareta Koi" (Japanese: エンド·ハウス怪事件,(その2)秘められた恋)	21 November 2004
18	"The Mystery of End House, Part 3: Perfect Evidence" "Endo Hausu Kai Jiken (sono san) Kanpeki na Shōko" (Japanese: エンド·ハウス怪事件,(その3)完璧な証拠)	28 November 2004
Original title: Peril at End House (1932)
19	"The Adventure of the Christmas Pudding, Part 1: The Request from the Prince" "Kurisumasu Pudingu no Bōken (zenpen) Purinsu kara no Irai" (Japanese: クリスマスプディングの冒険,(前編)プリンスからの依頼)	5 December 2004
20	"The Adventure of the Christmas Pudding, Part 2: The Ruby passed down through the Royal Family" "Kurisumasu Pudingu no Bōken (kōhen) Ōke ni Tsutawaru Rubī" (Japanese: クリスマスプディングの冒険,(後編)王家に伝わるルビー)	12 December 2004
The Adventure of the Christmas Pudding (1960)
21	"4:50 from Paddington, Part 1: The Train Rode By the Killer" "Padinton Hatsu Yonjigojūbun (sono ichi) Satsujinsha no Noru Ressha" (Japanese: パディントン発4時50分,(その1)殺人者の乗る列車)	9 January 2005
22	"4:50 from Paddington, Part 2: The Creeping Shadow" "Padinton Hatsu Yonjigojūbun (sono ni) Shinobiyoru Kage" (Japanese: パディントン発4時50分,(その2)忍び寄る影)	16 January 2005
23	"4:50 from Paddington, Part 3: A Simple Motive" "Padinton Hatsu Yonjigojūbun (sono san) Shinpuru na Dōki" (Japanese: パディントン発4時50分,(その3)シンプルな動機)	23 January 2005
24	"4:50 from Paddington, Part 4: Marple vs. the Culprit" "Padinton Hatsu Yonjigojūbun (sono yon) Māpuru tai Hannin" (Japanese: パディントン発4時50分,(その4)マープル対犯人)	30 January 2005
4:50 from Paddington (1957)
25	"The Plymouth Express, Part 1: The Corpse in the Drawing Room" "Purimasu-yuki Kyūkō-ressha (zenpen) Kyakushitsunai no Shitai" (Japanese: プリマス行き急行列車,(前編)客室内の死体)	6 February 2005
26	"The Plymouth Express, Part 2: The Blue Dress" "Purimasu yuki Kyūkō-ressha (kōhen) Burū no Wanpīsu" (Japanese: プリマス行き急行列車,(後編)ブルーのワンピース)	13 February 2005
Plymouth Express
27	"Motive versus Opportunity" "Dōki to Kikai" (Japanese: 動機と機会)	20 February 2005
Motive versus Opportunity (The Thirteen Problems,1932)
28	"The Disappearing Cook, Part 1: An Aggressive Request" "Kieta Ryōrinin (zenpen) Gōin na Irai" (Japanese: 消えた料理人,(前編)強引な依頼)	27 February 2005
29	"The Disappearing Cook, Part 2: The Secret of the Trunk" "Kieta Ryōrinin (kōhen) Toranku no Himitsu" (Japanese: 消えた料理人,(後編)トランクの秘密)	6 March 2005
The Adventure of the Clapham Cook
30	"Sleeping Murder, Part 1: Sleeping Murder" "Surīpingu Mādā (sono ichi) Nemureru Satsujin Jiken" (Japanese: スリーピング·マーダー,(その1)眠れる殺人事件)	13 March 2005
31	"Sleeping Murder, Part 2: The Door of Memory" "Surīpingu Mādā (sono ni) Kioku no Tobira" (Japanese: スリーピング·マーダー,(その2)記憶の扉)	20 March 2005
32	"Sleeping Murder, Part 3: Helen's Love" "Surīpingu Mādā (sono san) Heren no Koi" (Japanese: スリーピング·マーダー,(その3)ヘレンの恋)	27 March 2005
33	"Sleeping Murder, Part 4: The Evil Influence Nears" "Surīpingu Mādā (sono yon) Semarikuru Ma no Te" (Japanese: スリーピング·マーダー,(その4)迫り来る魔の手)	3 April 2005
Sleeping Murder (1976)
34	"Twenty-Four Japanese Thrushes" "Nijūyon-wa no Kuro-Tsugumi" (Japanese: 二十四羽の黒つぐみ)	10 April 2005
Original title: Four-and-Twenty Blackbirds (1941)
35	"The Case of Davenheim's Disappearance" "Dabunhaimu Shissō Jiken" (Japanese: ダブンハイム失踪事件)	17 April 2005
The Disappearance of Mr. Davenheim (Poirot Investigates, 1924)
36	"Death in the Clouds, Part 1: The Flying Locked Room" "Kumo no Naka no Shi (sono ichi) Sora Tobu Misshitsu" (Japanese: 雲の中の死,(その1)空飛ぶ密室)	24 April 2005
37	"Death in the Clouds, Part 2: Madame Giselle of Paris" "Kumo no Naka no Shi (sono ni) Pari no Madamu Jizeru" (Japanese: 雲の中の死,(その2)パリのマダムジゼル)	1 May 2005
38	"Death in the Clouds, Part 3: The Threat to Lady Horbury" "Kumo no Naka no Shi (sono san) Hōbari-fujin e no Kyōhaku" (Japanese: 雲の中の死,(その3)ホーバリ夫人への脅迫)	8 May 2005
39	"Death in the Clouds, Part 4: The Heir to the Vast Inheritance" "Kumo no Naka no Shi (sono yon) Bakudai na Isan no Sōzokunin" (Japanese: 雲の中の死,(その4)莫大な遺産の相続人)	15 May 2005
Death in the Clouds (1935)

=== DVD ===
Region 2, NTSC, Language: Japanese, subtitle: No

No.	Title	Release date	ISBN
1	Agatha Christie's Great Detectives Poirot and Marple vol.1:"The ABC Murders" and Other Stories アガサ・クリスティーの名探偵ポワロとマープル Vol.1 ABC殺人事件	22 April 2005	4-7786-0100-9
("The Jewel Robbery at the Grand Metropolitan","The Adventure of the Cheap Flat")
2	Agatha Christie's Great Detectives Poirot and Marple vol.2:"4:50 from Paddington" and Other Stories アガサ・クリスティーの名探偵ポワロとマープル Vol.2 パディントン発4時50分	22 April 2005	4-7786-0101-7
("Strange Jest","The Case of the Perfect Maid")
3	Agatha Christie's Great Detectives Poirot and Marple vol.3:"The Adventure of the Egyptian Tomb" and Other Stories アガサ・クリスティーの名探偵ポワロとマープル Vol.3 エジプト墳墓の謎	22 April 2005	4-7786-0102-5
("The Kidnapped Prime Minister","The Adventure of the Christmas Pudding")
4	Agatha Christie's Great Detectives Poirot and Marple vol.4:"Peril at End House" and Other Stories アガサ・クリスティーの名探偵ポワロとマープル Vol.4 エンド・ハウス怪事件	22 April 2005	4-7786-0103-3
("The Tape-Measure Murder","Ingots of Gold","The Blue Geranium")
5	Agatha Christie's Great Detectives Poirot and Marple vol.5:"The Plymouth Express" and Other Stories アガサ・クリスティーの名探偵ポワロとマープル Vol.5 プリマス行き急行列車	27 May 2005	4-7786-0104-1
("The Adventure of the Clapham Cook","Four-and-Twenty Blackbirds")
6	Agatha Christie's Great Detectives Poirot and Marple vol.6:"Sleeping Murder" and Other Story アガサ・クリスティーの名探偵ポワロとマープル Vol.6 スリーピング・マーダー	27 May 2005	4-7786-0105-X
("Motive versus Opportunity")
7	Agatha Christie's Great Detectives Poirot and Marple vol.7:"Death in the Clouds" and Other Story アガサ・クリスティーの名探偵ポワロとマープル Vol.7 雲の中の死	27 May 2005	4-7786-0106-8
("The Disappearance of Mr. Davenheim")

=== Manga ===
Three volumes of the manga adaptation of the television series were released in 2004 and 2005 by NHK Publishing, the publishing division of NHK. The adaptations were written by Yukiyoshi Oohashi (大橋志吉) (volumes 1 and 3) and Syouji Yonemura (米村正二) (volume 2), and illustrated by Morihiko Ishikawa (石川森彦).

No.	Title	Release date	ISBN
1	The ABC Murders; Ēbīshī Satsujin Jiken (ABC殺人事件)	24 August 2004	4-14-454084-7
2	4:50 from Paddington; Padinton Hatsu Yonjigojūbun (パディントン発4時50分)	25 December 2004	4-14-454085-5
3	Death in the Clouds; Kumo no Naka no Shi (雲の中の死)	30 May 2005	4-14-454086-3
