= Gabrielle Hamilton =

Gabrielle Hamilton may refer to:

- Gabrielle Hamilton (actress) (1923–2014), British actress
- Gabrielle Hamilton (chef) (born 1966), American chef and author
