= Sir Henry Clithering =

Fictional character devised by Agatha Christie

- First appearance: The Tuesday Night Club (1932)
- Last appearance: 4:50 from Paddington (1957)
- Created by: Agatha Christie
- Portrayed by: Raymond Francis; Graham Crowden; Donald Sinden

In-universe information
- Gender: Male
- Occupation: Police commissioner (retired)
- Family: Dermot Eric Craddock (godson)
- Nationality: English

Sir Henry Clithering is a fictional character who appears in a series of short stories by Agatha Christie, featuring Miss Marple. The stories were first published in monthly magazines starting in 1927, and then collected into a hard-bound collection, The Thirteen Problems in 1932. Clithering also appeared in several novels featuring Miss Marple.

== Overview ==
He is a retired Scotland Yard commissioner and his godson Dermot Eric Craddock is eventually a detective inspector at Scotland Yard.

Whenever local police warn Miss Marple not to interfere in an investigation, Sir Henry supports her. He recommends her to the county police trying to solve the crime in A Murder Is Announced, connecting Miss Marple to his godson, Detective Inspector Dermott Craddock, then working for the Chief Constable in the county. This is the first time Miss Marple and Inspector Craddock worked together.

In the novel The Mirror Crack'd from Side to Side, Craddock has been promoted to Chief Inspector in Scotland Yard.

== List of appearances ==
=== Short stories ===
- The Tuesday Night Club
- The Idol House of Astarte
- Ingots of Gold
- The Blood-Stained Pavement
- Motive v. Opportunity
- The Thumb Mark of St. Peter
- The Blue Geranium
- The Companion
- The Four Suspects
- A Christmas Tragedy
- The Herb of Death
- The Affair at the Bungalow
- Death by Drowning

=== Novels ===
- The Body in the Library
- A Murder is Announced
- A Pocket Full of Rye
- 4:50 from Paddington
- Nemesis (mentioned)

== In other media ==
=== Television ===
- The Body in the Library was adapted for the BBC's series Agatha Christie's Miss Marple in 1984 with Raymond Francis playing Sir Henry.
- The Blue Geranium was adapted for Agatha Christie's Marple in 2010 with Donald Sinden playing Sir Henry.

=== Radio ===
Graham Crowden voiced Sir Henry in the 1999 BBC Radio dramatisations of The Body in the Library and A Murder is Announced.
