= Raymond West (character) =

Fictional character of Agatha Christie

- First appearance: The Tuesday Night Club (1932)
- Last appearance: Sleeping Murder (1976)
- Created by: Agatha Christie
- Portrayed by: David McAlister (1987); Trevor Bowen (1989; 1992); Richard E. Grant (2007)

In-universe information
- Occupation: Author
- Spouse: Joan Lemprière
- Children: David West; Lionel West
- Relatives: Clara Marple (grandmother); Jane Marple (aunt); Mabel Denman (cousin); Giles Reed (cousin)
- Nationality: British

Raymond West is a fictional character who appears or is mentioned in several of Agatha Christie's novels and short stories featuring Jane Marple.

== Character overview ==
He is a well-known author and Miss Marple's nephew. He is not interested in Marple's cases, but in some novels (like A Caribbean Mystery and At Bertram's Hotel) he supports Marple financially. His wife Joan (née Lemprière), an artist, is also sympathetic to Marple.

In The Thirteen Problems (1932), his future wife's name was given as Joyce, not Joan. Raymond's mother was one of three girls, with Marple being the eldest and his mother having another sister. This other sister had a daughter, Raymond's cousin Mabel Denham, who was accused of murdering her husband, Geoffrey (The Thirteen Problems).

Raymond and Joan had two sons, one of whom is named David and works in British Railways. David was able to help his great-aunt solve a mystery regarding a missing corpse by sending her a map of a certain patch of railway (4:50 from Paddington). His other son, Lionel, is a keen stamp collector and has shown Miss Marple every single one, and told her about the rare 1855 Blue Stamp, which helps her solve a case regarding a lost inheritance (Miss Marple's Final Cases and Two Other Stories).

In the novel The Mirror Crack'd from Side to Side, Raymond is mentioned, as he engages Miss Knight to stay with Miss Marple, after an attack of bronchitis left her very weak, and Dr Haydock said that she must not go on sleeping alone in the house, with only someone coming in daily. Miss Marple also mentions that when staying with Raymond, she noticed that some of his guests seemed to arrive with quite a quantity of little bottles of pills and tablets, which they take with their food and drink. This gives her the idea that someone might add something to a drink quite openly, without anyone thinking twice about it.

== List of appearances ==
=== Short stories ===
- "The Tuesday Night Club"
- "The Idol House of Astarte"
- "Ingots of Gold"
- "The Blood-Stained Pavement"
- "Motive v. Opportunity"
- "The Thumb Mark of St. Peter"
- "Greenshaw's Folly"

=== Novels ===
- The Murder at the Vicarage
- At Bertram's Hotel (mentioned)
- Sleeping Murder

== In other media ==
=== Television ===
- Raymond appeared in three episodes of the BBC's Miss Marple series. He was played by David McAlister in Sleeping Murder, and Trevor Bowen in A Caribbean Mystery and The Mirror Crack'd from Side to Side. Bowen also wrote many of the episodes in the series.
- Richard E. Grant played Raymond in Nemesis for Agatha Christie's Marple.

=== BBC Radio ===
- Raymond Coulthard in The Case of the Perfect Maid
- Iwan Thomas in A Caribbean Mystery
