= Miss Marple =

Fictional character in Agatha Christie stories

Miss Jane Marple
- Joan Hickson as Miss Marple in the BBC series Miss Marple (1984–1992)
- First appearance: "The Tuesday Night Club"
- Last appearance: Sleeping Murder
- Created by: Agatha Christie
- Portrayed by: Gracie Fields; Margaret Rutherford; Angela Lansbury; Dulcie Gray; Helen Hayes; Ita Ever; Joan Hickson; Geraldine McEwan; June Whitfield; Julia McKenzie; Isabella Parriss (young); Renée Michels; Julie Cox (young); Toni Collette

In-universe information
- Gender: Female
- Title: Miss
- Occupation: Amateur detective
- Family: Clara Marple (mother); Two sisters
- Relatives: Raymond West (nephew); Mabel Denman (niece); Lionel West (great-nephew); David West (great-nephew); Henry (uncle); Jack (uncle); Thomas (uncle); Helen (aunt); Fanny Godfrey (cousin); Lady Ethel Merridew (cousin); Diana "Bunch" Harmon (goddaughter)
- Religion: Church of England (Christian)
- Nationality: British

Jane Marple, better known as Miss Marple, is a fictional character in Agatha Christie's crime novels and short stories. Miss Marple lives in the fictional English village of St Mary Mead and acts as an amateur consulting detective. Often characterised as an elderly spinster, she is one of Christie's best-known characters and has been portrayed numerous times on screen. Her first appearance was in a short story published in The Royal Magazine in December 1927, "The Tuesday Night Club", which later became the first chapter of The Thirteen Problems (1932). Her first appearance in a full-length novel was in The Murder at the Vicarage in 1930 and her last appearance was in Sleeping Murder in 1976.

== Origins ==
Marple is based on friends of Christie's step grandmother, Margaret Miller (née West). (Note: Margaret West was the sister of Mary Ann Boehmer, Agatha Christie's maternal grandmother. Margaret married Christie's paternal grandfather, Nathaniel Frary Miller, in 1863 in Westbourne, West Sussex. He died in 1869 and she dedicated a stained glass window to his memory in St. John's Church, Main Road, Southbourne, West Sussex. Margaret's stepson, Frederick Alvah Miller, went on to marry her niece Clarissa Boehmer. Apart from Agatha, they had two other children, Margaret Watts and Louis Montant Miller.) Christie attributed the inspiration for the character to multiple sources, stating that Miss Marple was "the sort of old lady who would have been rather like some of my step grandmother's Ealing cronies – old ladies whom I have met in so many villages where I have gone to stay as a girl". Christie also used material from her fictional creation, spinster Caroline Sheppard, who appeared in The Murder of Roger Ackroyd. When Michael Morton adapted the novel for the stage, he replaced the character of Caroline with a young girl. This change saddened Christie and she determined to give old maids a voice; thus, Miss Marple was born.

It is popularly believed that Christie took the character's name from Marple railway station, which she often passed through on her way to visit her sister Margaret Watts at Abney Hall, Cheshire. According to a letter, said to be from Christie to a fan, and dated 1968, the name was instead inspired by a visit to an auction at Marple Hall in the same town:

I expect you will be interested to learn that at the time I was writing The Thirteen Problems (starting with a series of 6 short stories for a magazine) I was staying with a sister of mine in Cheshire and we went to a sale at Marple Hall – the house alone, she said, was worth seeing, a beautiful old manor, belonging to the Bradshaws descended from Judge Bradshaw who sentenced Charles I.

It was a very good sale with fine old Elizabethan and Jacobean furniture and at it I bought 2 Jacobean oak chairs which I still have – wanting a name for my "old maid" character I called her Jane Marple.

However, while the auction was held in July 1929 (and two Jacobean armchairs are still at Christie's Greenway Estate), the first six Miss Marple stories had already been published in The Royal Magazine from December 1927 to May 1928.

== Character ==
Miss Marple makes her first full-length appearance in The Murder at the Vicarage. In this early portrayal she is a gleeful gossip, sharp-tongued, and not always sympathetic. The residents of St Mary Mead respect her but often find her nosiness and habit of assuming the worst in others tiresome. In later novels, however, Christie softened her character: Miss Marple becomes a kinder, more thoughtful figure, though still an astute observer of human nature.

Her method of detection rests on shrewd intelligence and long observation of village life, which she believes reveals the full range of human failings. She frequently interprets new crimes by recalling past incidents and she has a talent for recognising the hidden significance of apparently casual remarks. At times she is aided by her friend Sir Henry Clithering, a retired Metropolitan Police commissioner, who supplies her with official information.

Miss Marple never married and has no close family apart from her nephew, Raymond West, a "well-known author". He appears in several stories with his wife, the artist Joyce Lemprière and is portrayed as overestimating his own intellect while underestimating his aunt's. Following the retirement of her long-time maid Florence, Miss Marple occasionally employs girls from a local orphanage to train as housemaids. She also endures a brief period with the tiresome Miss Knight as her companion, before settling in later years with Cherry Baker, first introduced in The Mirror Crack'd from Side to Side.

Although of independent means, Miss Marple is not wealthy and relies in her old age on financial support from Raymond. She is a gentlewoman rather than a member of the aristocracy, yet moves comfortably in upper-class circles. Christie hints at a broad education: in They Do It with Mirrors, Miss Marple recalls growing up in a cathedral close and attending an Italian finishing school with Ruth Van Rydock and Caroline "Carrie" Louise Serrocold.

Christie was notably inconsistent about the character's age. In 1957's 4:50 from Paddington, Miss Marple claims she will be "90 next year", but in At Bertram's Hotel (1965) she is implied to be about 75, having first visited the hotel some sixty years earlier at the age of fourteen. Across the 41 years between her first and last novels – excluding the posthumously published Sleeping Murder – she does age, though not in a strictly realistic fashion. Miss Marple herself sometimes shows frailty, such as needing a holiday after illness in A Caribbean Mystery, yet she is vigorous again in Nemesis, set only sixteen months later.

Miss Marple's wider family is mentioned only in passing. She has a sister, Raymond's mother, and a large network of cousins and nieces, including Mabel Denham, accused of poisoning her husband in The Thumb Mark of St Peter. In The Mirror Crack'd from Side to Side, Miss Marple references an uncle who had been Canon of Chichester Cathedral.

== Bibliography ==
Agatha Christie wrote 12 novels and 20 short stories featuring Miss Marple.

=== Miss Marple series ===
1. The Murder at the Vicarage (1930, Novel)
2. The Body in the Library (1942, Novel)
3. The Moving Finger (1943, Novel)
4. A Murder Is Announced (1950, Novel)
5. They Do It with Mirrors (1952, Novel) – also published in the United States as Murder With Mirrors
6. A Pocket Full of Rye (1953, Novel)
7. 4:50 from Paddington (1957, Novel) – also published in the United States as What Mrs. McGillicuddy Saw!
8. The Mirror Crack'd from Side to Side (1962, Novel)
9. A Caribbean Mystery (1964, Novel)
10. At Bertram's Hotel (1965, Novel)
11. Nemesis (1971, Novel)
12. Sleeping Murder (1976, Novel) – published last but written and set in the 1940s.

=== Miss Marple short story collections ===
- The Thirteen Problems (1932, short story collection featuring Miss Marple, also published as The Tuesday Club Murders)
- The Regatta Mystery (1939, Collection)
- Three Blind Mice and Other Stories (1950, Collection)
- The Adventure of the Christmas Pudding (1960, Collection)
- Double Sin and Other Stories (1961, Collection)
- Miss Marple's Final Cases and Two Other Stories (short stories collected posthumously, also published as Miss Marple's Final Cases, but only six of the eight stories actually feature Miss Marple) (written between 1939 and 1954, published 1979)
- Miss Marple: The Complete Short Stories, published 1985, includes 20 from 4 sets: The Thirteen Problems, The Regatta Mystery, Three Blind Mice and Other Stories, and Double Sin and Other Stories.

Miss Marple also appears in "Greenshaw's Folly", a short story included as part of the Poirot collection The Adventure of the Christmas Pudding (1960). Four stories in the Three Blind Mice collection (1950) feature Miss Marple: "Strange Jest", "Tape-Measure Murder", "The Case of the Caretaker", and "The Case of the Perfect Maid".

The Autograph edition of Miss Marple's Final Cases includes the eight in the original plus "Greenshaw's Folly".

=== Continuations by other authors ===
- Marple: Twelve New Stories (2022). A collection of stories written by 12 different authors.
- Murder at the Grand Alpine Hotel (2026). A new novel by Lucy Foley.

=== Books about Miss Marple ===
- The Life and Times of Miss Jane Marple – a biography by Anne Hart
- Agatha Christie's Marple: Expert on Wickedness – by Mark Aldridge

== Stage ==
A stage adaptation of Murder at the Vicarage, by Moie Charles and Barbara Toy, was first seen at Northampton on 17 October 1949; it was directed by Reginald Tate, starred the 35-year-old Barbara Mullen as Miss Marple, and after touring, reached the Playhouse Theatre in London's West End on 14 December. Having run till late March 1950, it then went on tour again.

In July 1974, Mullen (by then 60) returned to the role in another national tour of the same play, culminating 12 months later when the show opened at London's Savoy Theatre on 28 July 1975. At the end of March 1976, the Miss Marple role was taken over by Avril Angers, after which the production transferred to the Fortune Theatre on 5 July. The role then passed to Muriel Pavlow in June 1977 and to Gabrielle Hamilton late the following year; the production finally closed in October 1979.

On 21 September 1977, while Murder at the Vicarage was still running at the Fortune, a stage adaptation by Leslie Darbon of A Murder Is Announced opened at the Vaudeville Theatre, with Dulcie Gray as Miss Marple. The show ran to the end of September 1978 and then toured.

== Films ==
=== Margaret Rutherford ===
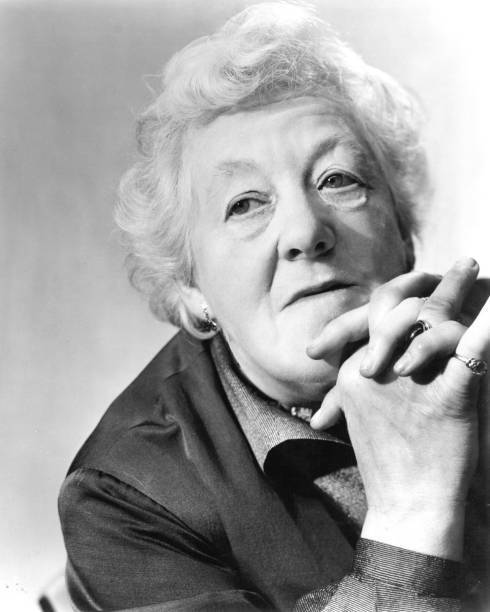
Margaret Rutherford played Miss Marple in four films between 1961 and 1964.

Margaret Rutherford played Miss Marple in four films between 1961 and 1964, directed by George Pollock, written by David Pursall, Jack Seddon, and James P. Cavanagh, alongside Charles Tingwell and Stringer Davis. These were successful light comedies, but Christie herself was disappointed with them. Nevertheless, Agatha Christie dedicated the novel The Mirror Crack'd from Side to Side to Rutherford.

Rutherford presented the character as a bold and eccentric old lady, different from the prim and birdlike character Christie created in her novels. As penned by Christie, Miss Marple has never worked for a living – though the character as portrayed by Margaret Rutherford briefly works undercover as a housekeeper – but is engaged in various philanthropical and cultural endeveours. Her education and genteel background are hinted at when she mentions her awards at marksmanship (and demonstrates her shooting prowess), dancing, fencing, and equestrianism, although these hints are played for comedic value. The character's expertise in solving crimes are based less on observations of village life but on reading crime fiction, with Agatha Christie herself frequently name dropped.

Murder, She Said (1961) was the first of the four British MGM productions starring Rutherford. This film was based on the 1957 novel 4:50 from Paddington (U.S. title, What Mrs. McGillicuddy Saw!), and the changes made in the plot were typical of the series. In the film, Mrs. McGillicuddy is cut from the plot. Rutherford's Miss Marple combines both the witness to the murder as well as the housekeeper working under cover into her character. Actress Joan Hickson, who played Miss Marple in the 1984–1992 television adaptations, has a role as an household help in this movie.

Murder at the Gallop (1963), based on the 1953 Hercule Poirot novel, After the Funeral (in this film, she is identified as JTV Marple, though there was no indication as to what the extra initials might stand for).

Murder Most Foul (1964), based on the 1952 Poirot novel Mrs McGinty's Dead.

Murder Ahoy! (1964). The last film is not based on any singular Christie work but displays a few plot elements from They Do It with Mirrors (viz., the ship is used as a reform school for wayward boys and one of the teachers uses them as a crime force), as well as similarities to The Mousetrap.

The music to all four films was composed and conducted by Ron Goodwin. The same theme is used on all four films with slight variations in each. The score was written within a couple of weeks by Goodwin who was approached by Pollock after Pollock had heard about him from Stanley Black. Black had worked with Pollock on Stranger in Town in 1957 and had previously hired Goodwin as his orchestrator.

Rutherford, who was 68 years old when the first film was shot in February 1961, insisted that she wear her own clothes during the filming of the movie, as well as having her husband, Stringer Davis, appear alongside her as the character Mr Stringer. The Rutherford films are frequently repeated on television in Germany, and in that country Miss Marple is generally identified with Rutherford's quirky portrayal.

Rutherford also appeared briefly as Miss Marple in the parodic Hercule Poirot adventure The Alphabet Murders (1965).

=== Angela Lansbury ===
In 1980, Angela Lansbury played Miss Marple in The Mirror Crack'd (EMI, directed by Guy Hamilton), based on Christie's 1962 novel. The film featured an all-star cast that included Elizabeth Taylor, Rock Hudson, Geraldine Chaplin, Tony Curtis, and Kim Novak. Edward Fox appeared as Inspector Craddock, who did Miss Marple's legwork. Lansbury's Marple was a crisp, intelligent woman who moved stiffly and spoke in clipped tones. Unlike most incarnations of Miss Marple, this one smoked cigarettes. Lansbury was later cast as Jessica Fletcher in Murder, She Wrote, a similar role.

=== Ita Ever ===
In 1983, the Estonian stage and film actress Ita Ever starred in the Russian language Mosfilm adaptation of Agatha Christie's novel, A Pocket Full of Rye (using the Russian edition's translated title, The Secret of the Blackbirds), as the character of Miss Marple. Ever has also portrayed the character of Miss Marple in the Eesti Televisioon (ETV) series Miss Marple Stories in 1990, and onstage at the Tallinn City Theatre in a production of The Mirror Crack'd from Side to Side in 2005.

=== Future works ===
In October 2024, it was revealed that 20th Century Studios, which has produced the Hercule Poirot films with Kenneth Branagh, plans to adapt more of Christie's work, including unspecified Miss Marple titles.

== Television ==
The first on-screen portrayal of Miss Marple was by British actress and singer Gracie Fields, playing her in a 1956 episode of the American series Goodyear TV Playhouse based on A Murder Is Announced, the 1950 Christie novel.

In 1970, the character of Miss Marple was portrayed by Inge Langen in a West German television adaptation of The Murder at the Vicarage (Mord im Pfarrhaus).

=== Helen Hayes ===
American stage and screen actress, Helen Hayes, portrayed Miss Marple in two American television films for CBS near the end of her decades-long acting career: A Caribbean Mystery (1983) and Murder with Mirrors (1985).

=== Joan Hickson ===
From 1984 to 1992, the BBC adapted all of the original Miss Marple novels as a series titled Miss Marple. Joan Hickson played the lead role. In the 1940s, she had appeared on stage in an Agatha Christie play Appointment with Death, seen by Christie, who wrote in a note to her, "I hope one day you will play my dear Miss Marple". Hickson portrayed a maid in the 1937 film Love from a Stranger, which starred Ann Harding and Basil Rathbone, another Agatha Christie play adaptation. As well as portraying Miss Marple on television, Hickson narrated Miss Marple stories for audio books. In the "Binge!" article of Entertainment Weekly Issue #1343–1344 (26 December 2014 – 3 January 2015), the writers picked Hickson as "Best Marple" in the "Hercule Poirot & Miss Marple" timeline.

Listing of the TV series featuring Joan Hickson:

- The Body in the Library (1984)
- The Moving Finger (1985)
- A Murder Is Announced (1985)
- A Pocket Full of Rye (1985)
- The Murder at the Vicarage (1986) – BAFTA nomination
- Sleeping Murder (1987)
- At Bertram's Hotel (1987)
- Nemesis (1987) – BAFTA nomination
- 4:50 from Paddington (1987)
- A Caribbean Mystery (1989)
- They Do It With Mirrors (1991)
- The Mirror Crack'd from Side to Side (1992)

=== Geraldine McEwan (2004–2008) and Julia McKenzie (2009–2013) ===
Beginning in 2004, ITV broadcast a series of adaptations of Agatha Christie's books under the title Agatha Christie's Marple, usually referred to as Marple. Geraldine McEwan starred in the first three series. Julia McKenzie took over the role from the fourth series onwards.

The adaptations change the plots and characters of the original books (e.g. incorporating lesbian affairs, changing the identities of some killers, renaming or removing significant characters, and even using stories from other books in which Miss Marple did not originally feature). In the Geraldine McEwan series, it is revealed that when she was young (portrayed by Julie Cox in a flashback), Miss Marple had an affair with a married soldier, Captain Ainsworth, who was killed in action in World War I, in December 1915. It is also said (in A Murder Is Announced) that she served as an ambulance driver during World War I.

Listing of the TV series featuring Geraldine McEwan and Julia McKenzie:

- The Body in the Library (2004)
- The Murder at the Vicarage (2004)
- 4:50 from Paddington (2004)
- A Murder Is Announced (2005)
- Sleeping Murder (2005)
- The Moving Finger (2006)
- By the Pricking of My Thumbs (2006)
- The Sittaford Mystery (2006)
- At Bertram's Hotel (2007)
- Ordeal by Innocence (2007)
- Towards Zero (2008)
- Nemesis (2008)
- A Pocket Full of Rye (2009)
- Murder Is Easy (2009)
- They Do It with Mirrors (2010)
- Why Didn't They Ask Evans? (2011)
- The Pale Horse (2010)
- The Secret of Chimneys (2010)
- The Blue Geranium (2010)
- The Mirror Crack'd from Side to Side (2011)
- A Caribbean Mystery (2013)
- Greenshaw's Folly (2013)
- Endless Night (2013)

In 2015, CBS planned a "much younger" version of the character, a granddaughter who takes over a California bookstore.

In 2018, Miss Marple was portrayed by Yunjin Kim in the South Korean television series Ms. Ma, Nemesis.

=== Anime ===
From 2004 to 2005, Japanese TV network NHK produced a 39 episode anime series titled Agatha Christie's Great Detectives Poirot and Marple, which features both Miss Marple and Hercule Poirot. Miss Marple's voice is provided by Kaoru Yachigusa. Episodes adapted both short stories and novels.

The anime series dramatised the following Miss Marple stories:

- "Strange Jest" (EP 3)
- "The Case of the Perfect Maid" (EP 4)
- "The Tape-Measure Murder" (EP 13)
- "Ingots of Gold" (EP 14)
- "The Blue Geranium" (EP 15)
- 4:50 from Paddington (EP 21–24)
- "Motive versus Opportunity" (EP 27)
- Sleeping Murder (EP 30–33)

== Audio ==
=== BBC Radio ===
June Whitfield starred as Miss Marple in Michael Bakewell's adaptations of all twelve novels, broadcast on BBC Radio 4 between 1993 and 2001.

Three short stories with Whitfield ("Tape-Measure Murder", "The Case of the Perfect Maid" and "Sanctuary") were later broadcast under the collective title Miss Marple's Final Cases weekly 16 – 30 September 2015.

=== Audible ===
Toni Collette stars as Miss Marple in the most recent adaptation of The Murder in the Vicarage from Audible.

== Other appearances ==
Miss Marple, as she appeared in volume 20 of Detective Conan

In the 1976 Neil Simon spoof Murder by Death, Miss Marple is parodied as "Miss Marbles" by Elsa Lanchester.

Marple was highlighted in volume 20 of the Detective Conan manga's edition of "Gosho Aoyama's Mystery Library" published in 1998, a section of the graphic novels where the author introduces a different detective (or occasionally, a villain) from mystery literature, television, or other media.

== See also ==
- List of female detective characters
