= The Royal Magazine =

British literary magazine

- Copy of the cover of the June 1898 issue of The Royal Magazine.
- Categories: literary magazine
- Frequency: Monthly
- Publisher: C. Arthur Pearson Ltd
- Founder: Sir Arthur Pearson
- First issue: November 1898; 127 years ago
- Final issue: September 1939
- Country: United Kingdom
- Based in: London
- Language: English

The Royal Magazine was a monthly British literary magazine that was published between 1898 and 1939. Its founder and publisher was Sir Arthur Pearson.

The Royal Magazine's first edition was published in November 1898. According to this issue, one million copies of the first edition of the magazine were ordered. Editors of the magazine included Percy Everett (1901–1911).

Throughout the 1930s, as the magazine struggled to regain its relevance, it changed names a number of times. With the December 1930 issue, the magazine re-christened itself The New Royal Magazine. Beginning in June 1932, it became The Royal Pictorial. Beginning in January 1935, it was The Royal Screen Pictorial, and in June 1935, the word "Royal" was dropped entirely as it became The Screen Pictorial. The magazine's final issue was in September 1939, the month in which the Second World War began in Europe. In total, 491 issues were published.

The magazine was the initial publisher of a number of the works of fiction by Agatha Christie. "The Tuesday Night Club", which appeared in the December 1927 issue, was the first published appearance of Christie's character, Miss Marple.
