= Raymond Francis =

British actor (1911–1987)

- Publicity still for No Hiding Place
- Born: Reginald George Thompson; 6 October 1911; Finchley, London, England, UK
- Died: 24 October 1987 (aged 76); Hove, Sussex, UK
- Spouse(s): Gabrielle Brune; Margaret Towner
- Children: 3, including Clive Francis

Raymond Francis (6 October 1911 – 24 October 1987) was a British actor best known for his role as Detective Chief Superintendent Tom Lockhart in the Associated-Rediffusion detective series Murder Bag, Crime Sheet and No Hiding Place. He played the role of Lockhart in these series from 1957 to 1967 and the character was one of the first recurring television detectives.

== Career ==
Born in London as Reginald George Thompson, his first listed television role was as Dr. Watson alongside Alan Wheatley's Holmes in a 1951 BBC TV series entitled We Present Alan Wheatley as Mr Sherlock Holmes in..., the earliest television adaptation of the tales. He later reprised the role in a 1984 film The Case of Marcel Duchamp.

His distinguished appearance often led to roles as senior policemen, military men and English aristocrats; he played such parts in series including Dickens of London, Edward & Mrs. Simpson, The Cedar Tree, Tales of the Unexpected, After Julius, Drummonds, the first Joan Hickson Miss Marple episode "The Body in the Library" as Sir Henry Clithering, and his final appearance was in a 1987 Ruth Rendell Mysteries adaptation.

He also appeared as Clement Lawrence in the 1973 episode 'The Windsor Royal' of the long running television series Public Eye.

He was also a noted stage actor and made several appearances in films such as Carrington V.C. and Reach for the Sky.

== Personal life and death ==
In 1935 Francis married as his first wife the actress Gabrielle Brune (1912–2005). The couple subsequently divorced. His second wife was Margaret Towner (1920–2017), also an actress. He met Towner during World War II in connection with the Entertainments National Service Association's (ENSA) touring stage production of The Amazing Dr. Clitterhouse. They married and had three children, one of whom was the actor Clive Francis.

Francis died on 24 October 1987, aged 76.

== Film and Television ==
- Mr. Denning Drives North (1951) as Clerk of the Court
- The Super Secret Service (1953) as King of Flanubria
- Carrington V.C. (1955) as Major Mitchell
- Above Us the Waves (1955) as Officer on Towing Sub. (I)
- The Deep Blue Sea (1955) as RAF Officer Jackie Jackson (uncredited)
- Storm Over the Nile (1955) as Colonel's Aide
- Portrait of Alison (1955) as Police Inspector - Interpol Division (uncredited)
- Doublecross (1956) as Inspector Harris
- Bhowani Junction (1956) as Captain Cumberly (uncredited)
- Reach for the Sky (1956) as Wing Commander Hargreaves (uncredited)
- The Man in the Sky (1957) as Jenkins
- The Steel Bayonet (1957) as General
- Just My Luck (1957) as Ritchie
- Carve Her Name with Pride (1958) as S.O.E. Officer (uncredited)
- No Hiding Place (1959-1967, television Series) as Chief Supt. Tom Lockhart
- Hell Is Empty (1967) as Defence Counsel
- It Shouldn't Happen to a Vet (1977) as Colonel Bosworth
- The Case of Marcel Duchamp (1984) as Dr. Watson
- Miss Marple (1984) as Sir Henry Clithering (The Body in the Library episode)
