= The Thirteen Problems =

1932 short story collection by Agatha Christie

- Dust-jacket illustration of the first UK edition
- Author: Agatha Christie
- Language: English
- Genre: Detective fiction Short stories
- Publisher: Collins Crime Club
- Publication date: 18 June 1932
- Publication place: United Kingdom
- Media type: Print (hardback & paperback)
- Pages: 256 (first edition, hardcover)
- Preceded by: Peril at End House
- Followed by: Lord Edgware Dies

The Thirteen Problems is a short story collection by British writer Agatha Christie, first published in the UK by Collins Crime Club on 18 June 1932 and in the US by Dodd, Mead and Company in 1933 under the title The Tuesday Club Murders. The UK edition retailed at seven shillings and sixpence (7/6) and the US edition at $2.00. The thirteen stories feature the amateur detective Miss Marple, her nephew Raymond West, and her friend Sir Henry Clithering. They are the earliest stories Christie wrote about Miss Marple, the individual stories having originally appeared in various magazines between 1927 and 1931. The main setting for the frame story is the fictional village of St Mary Mead.

== Plot introduction ==
As in her short story collection Partners in Crime, Christie employs an overarching narrative, making the book more like an episodic novel. There are three sets of narratives, though they themselves interrelate. The first set of six are stories told by the "Tuesday Night Club", a random gathering of people at the house of Miss Marple. Each week the group tell tales of mystery, always solved by the female amateur detective from the comfort of her armchair. One of the guests is Sir Henry Clithering, an ex-Commissioner of Scotland Yard, and this allows Christie to resolve the story, with him usually pointing out that the criminals were caught.

Sir Henry Clithering invites Miss Marple to a dinner party, where the next set of six stories are told. The group of guests employ a similar guessing game, and once more Miss Marple triumphs. The thirteenth story, "Death by Drowning", takes place some time after the dinner party when Miss Marple finds out that Clithering is staying in St Mary Mead and asks him to help in the investigation surrounding the death of a local village girl. At the start of the story Miss Marple secretly works out who the murderer is and her solution proves correct.

== Plots ==
=== The Tuesday Night Club ===
A group of friends are meeting at the house of Miss Marple in St Mary Mead. As well as the old lady herself, there is her nephew – the writer Raymond West – the artist Joyce Lemprière, Sir Henry Clithering (a former Scotland Yard commissioner), a clergyman called Dr Pender, and Mr Petherick, a solicitor. The conversation turns to unsolved mysteries; Raymond, Joyce, Pender, and Petherick all claim that their professions are ideal for solving crimes. Joyce suggests that they form a club; every Tuesday night, a member of the group must tell of a real mystery, and the others will attempt to solve it. Sir Henry agrees to participate, and Miss Marple brightly volunteers herself to round out the group.

Sir Henry tells the first story of three people who sat down to a supper after which all of them fell ill, supposedly of food poisoning, and one died as a result. The three people were a Mr and Mrs Jones and the wife's companion, Miss Clark, and it was Mrs Jones who died. Mr Jones was a commercial traveller; a maid in one of the hotels in which he stayed saw blotting paper he had used to write a letter, whose decipherable phrases referred to his dependency on his wife's money, her death, and "hundreds and thousands". The maid read of the death in a paper and, knowing relatives in the same village where Mr and Mrs Jones lived, wrote to them. This started a chain of gossip which led to the exhumation of the body and the discovery that Mrs Jones was poisoned with arsenic. There was further gossip linking Mr Jones to the doctor's daughter, but there was nothing substantive there. The Jones's maid, Gladys, tearfully confirmed that all three people had been served the same meal of tinned lobster, bread and cheese, and trifle. She had also prepared a bowl of cornflour for Mrs Jones to calm her stomach, but Miss Clark ate this, despite the diet she was on for her consistent weight problems. Jones also had a plausible explanation for the letter which was blotted in the hotel room.

The people in the room deliver their various theories as to who the murderer is, but neglect to ask Miss Marple, until Sir Henry politely points out the omission. Miss Marple witters on about a similar case involving a local family (to which Raymond cannot see any relevance) until she suddenly asks Sir Henry if Gladys confessed, and says that she hopes Mr Jones will hang for what he made the poor girl do. The letter in the hotel room was to Gladys. Hundreds and thousands refers to sweets sprinkled atop the dessert; Mr Jones had mixed arsenic with them and given them to Gladys to use for the trifle. Miss Clark had not eaten the dessert (due to her diet) and Mr Jones scraped off the poisoned sweets. Sir Henry confirms that Miss Marple is correct. Mr Jones had got Gladys pregnant and used a promise of marriage after his wife's death to persuade the girl to commit murder. He then married someone else. The baby died shortly after its birth and Gladys confessed while dying.

=== The Idol House of Astarte ===
The group meets the following week and it is the turn of Dr Pender to tell his story. His tale is one in which a man was struck down by "no human agency". It took place at a house on the edge of Dartmoor called "Silent Grove" which was newly purchased by Sir Richard Haydon, an old college friend of the doctor's. Dr Pender was invited to a house party there, where they were joined by seven other people including a striking society beauty named Diana Ashley. Sir Richard was much attracted to her, as were most of the other men in the party, and she bewitched them all in turn. On the moor outside the house were several relics of the Stone Age and within the grounds of the house was a grove of trees which Sir Richard fancied was an authentic grove of Astarte, in the centre of which he had built a rough temple in the form of a stone summerhouse. Diana Ashley was enthused enough by the grove and the structure it contained to wildly suggest a moonlit orgy to the goddess of the Moon, a suggestion which, unsurprisingly, was vetoed by Dr Pender and some of the others, part of their objection being a feeling of evil that the setting provoked in their imaginations.

Toned down to a fancy dress party, Diana's suggestion was accepted by the others to take place that night, and preparations happily took place. Diana's shapeless dress, titled 'the unknown', disappointed the group for its lack of imagination, and during the party she disappeared, last being seen heading towards the grove. The others followed and found her in her true costume, magnificently adorned in the moonlight as a priestess of Astarte. She warned the others not to approach but Sir Richard did and promptly collapsed on the ground. When he was examined by his cousin, Elliot, and then Dr Symonds, they found he was dead, killed by a stab to the heart, but no one was seen to approach him and no weapon was found on the grassy floor. They took the body into the house and the police were called. Not satisfied, Elliot went back alone to the grove to investigate further and later the others found him struck down in the same spot with a knife wound in his shoulder and the knife in his hand. His story was one of seeing an illusion of the goddess and then being struck down himself. The knife was identified as one dug up from a barrow on the moor, which was kept in Sir Richard's house. The police suspected Diana but had no proof or explanation as to how she could have committed the crime.

The members of the Tuesday Club debate possible solutions between them but Miss Marple hits on the correct one: although she does not know what caused Sir Richard to stumble – possibly a trip over a tree root – it was his cousin Elliot who quickly stabbed him in the pretence of examining him. The knife was hidden as part of his fancy dress costume. Dr Pender confirms that five years later, Elliot wrote to him on the eve of an expedition to the South Pole admitting the crime and the torment he has suffered since. His motive was love for Diana Ashley, and by killing his cousin he both removed a rival and inherited his wealth. He hoped to atone for his crime and assuage his guilt by dying honourably, which the clergyman confirms he did. Although Dr Pender has disguised the names, Sir Henry has recognized the case and the persons involved in it.

=== Ingots of Gold ===
Raymond West takes his turn in telling a story. It took place two years earlier when Raymond spent Whitsun in Cornwall with a recent acquaintance called John Newman. He was something of an authority on the Spanish Armada and had bought the salvage rights to a shipwreck from the Armada which sank off the coast and eluded many attempts at recovery over the years. Travelling by train to Newman's house in the village of Polperran, Raymond shared a carriage with Police Inspector Badgworth who knew of the Spanish treasure trove but was specifically interested in the more recent wreck of a ship called the RMS Otranto. The latter sank six months earlier and its bullion had either been removed from the ship's strongroom after the hull had been torn open on the rocks of Serpent's Point, or stolen some time before. The Inspector was investigating the matter.

Arriving in Cornwall, Raymond settled into Newman's house and the following day went with him to the local pub, The Three Anchors, where he immediately felt suspicious of the landlord, Mr Kelvin, who made meaningful comments about the police and other "foreigners" looking into local matters. The next day, Sunday, saw a storm brewing over the area, and this coincided with Raymond having a feeling of foreboding. This feeling was justified when Newman went out for a walk that night and failed to return, although his disappearance was not noticed until the following day. A search was set up and the missing man was found bound and gagged in a local ditch. His story was that he spotted some men bringing something onto a beach by boat in a local spot appropriately called "Smuggler's Cove" and then putting the cargo into a local cave. The men set upon him, bound him and drove him to the ditch in a lorry. Badgworth found evidence that the cave had been used to store something but, more importantly, tyre tracks on the route on which Newman was taken matched a tyre on a lorry owned by Mr Kelvin. A night nurse of a neighbour testified the lorry was never taken out of its garage on the night in question. Kelvin evaded arrest and Raymond didn't know the solution to the mystery.

Again it is Miss Marple who hits on the solution, when she admonishes her nephew on his choice of friends, and Sir Henry confirms that he knows something of the case and that the old lady is right. Newman is not the man's real name and he is now in Princetown Prison for the theft of gold from a London strongroom. He used the wreck and smuggling story to cover his tracks and Kelvin was set up as a scapegoat. The landlord's lorry was never used, but a tyre was taken off it during the night and put on another lorry to provide the "evidence". Newman's accomplice was probably his gardener whom Raymond saw working on a bed of rose trees on the Monday morning when they realised Newman was "missing" – as Miss Marple states, real gardeners never work on Whit Monday!

=== The Blood-Stained Pavement ===
Joyce Lemprière's story also takes place in Cornwall, in the picturesque village of Rathole. One morning, she was painting a picture of the Polharwith Arms when two cars drew up within a couple of minutes of each other. The first contained a couple and the second a scarlet-dressed woman. The man in the couple, "Denis", recognised the lone woman as "Carol", an old friend, and introduced her to his somewhat plain wife, "Margery". As Joyce worked on her canvas she overheard the conversation of the three people, and Denis's suggestion of hiring a rowboat to take them round the coast to a local cave. Carol, disliking boats, agreed to walk to the spot and meet the couple there. That afternoon Joyce had returned to her canvas in front of the pub, spotted two bathing suits drying in the sun from the balcony of the pub, and assumed that the three people had returned. A local man engaged her in somewhat unwanted conversation and distracted her from her work. Before she realised what she had done, she seemed to have painted in bloodstains on the pavement in front of the pub, and was astonished to find that she had captured reality – there did seem to be bloodstains on the pavement that were not there a short time before. Before she could take any action, Denis emerged from the pub and asked Joyce and the local man if they had seen Carol return. The three had met at the cave, as agreed, and Carol had supposedly walked back to Rathole but not arrived, although her car was still there. Denis and Margery drove off and Joyce inspected the pavement – only to find the bloodstains gone. Two days later, she read in the paper that Margery had disappeared while bathing in the sea, and a week later her body was found washed up with a blow to the head, supposedly caused when she dived into the water on some rocks.

The men in the Tuesday Club feel that there is very little in the story to go on, but Miss Marple points out that they do not appreciate the point about clothes as she and Joyce do. The bloodstains were on the pavement, dripping from one of the bathing suits, which was scarlet in colour. The criminals didn't realise that when they hung them up to dry. Joyce confirms her point and finishes the story: a year later, at an east coast resort, she saw the same set up again with Denis, Carol and another woman, supposedly Denis's new wife. Although she didn't know exactly what was happening, Joyce went to the police station and reported suspicious activity. A Scotland Yard inspector was already there investigating Denis who, under several names, had married women, insured their lives for large sums, and then killed them in a conspiracy with Carol – his real wife. The woman Joyce saw in Rathole at the time that the bloodstains were on the pavement wasn't Margery but Carol in disguise. When they killed the real Margery during the trip to the cave, blood must have got onto the scarlet bathing suit.

=== Motive v. Opportunity ===
Mr Petherick tells his story, which has a legal background. A client of his, whom he calls "Simon Clode", was a wealthy man who had one son who was killed in the First World War and left an orphaned granddaughter who in turn died when she was a child, leaving the old man bereft and grief-stricken. A brother of his had also recently died and his three children, Grace, Mary and George – all grown-up by the time of the story – came to live with Simon. His will left his estate to these three in equal shares. Grace married but lived nearby with her husband, Philip. George found employment in a bank, while Mary stayed behind to care for Simon. The old man still pined for his granddaughter and found himself under the influence of an American spiritualist, Mrs Eurydice Spragg, and her husband, Absalom. Mrs Spragg conducted many séances, in which "Simon Clode" 'contacted' his granddaughter, and the Spraggs were virtually resident in the house.

Alarmed by this, Mr Petherick visited his client and then suggested to Grace's husband, Philip, that a noted professor on the subject of spiritualism be invited to the house to witness the séances. This happened, with the result that the professor stated that the Spraggs were frauds. At hearing this, "Simon Clode" threw Philip out of the house in a fit of anger. The old man then fell ill and was near death. He instructed Petherick to attend him to draw up a new will leaving five thousand pounds to each of his nieces and nephews and the greater part to the Spraggs. As the old man lay in his bed, Petherick tried to dissuade Clode against the terms of the new will but to no avail. Two servants were summoned and instructed to fetch a pen and witness the new will, which Clode wrote out himself and gave to Petherick for safekeeping.

After this part of the business had been concluded, Petherick went downstairs for tea and to help George Clode with some matters to do with the estate. During this period, Petherick left his overcoat where only Mrs Spragg could have gained access to the envelope with the will in it. Petherick took it to his office where he was soon visited by Mr Spragg, who was left alone with the will for a few moments. Two months later, Clode died. When the will was opened, the sheet was blank. Petherick's problem was that Mrs Spragg had the opportunity to change the will, but the will was already in her favour, so she had the opportunity but no motive. George had the motive but no opportunity, as when he had access to the will Mr Petherick was present.

Miss Marple again guesses the solution – the pen used to write out the will contained a solution of starch in water with a few drops of iodine in it (i.e. disappearing ink). Petherick confirms that Philip confessed as much in a guarded conversation they had had a month later. The house servants were told which pen to fetch for Simon Clode if it looked like he was going to be signing a legal form, and they complied. The three children gained their rightful inheritance.

=== The Thumb Mark of St. Peter ===
The final story to be told at the regular meeting of the Tuesday Club comes from Miss Marple herself. It concerns a niece of hers called Mabel who obstinately married Geoffrey Denman when she was twenty-two, despite Denman having a violent temper and a history of insanity in his family. Ten years later he died, and Miss Marple wrote to offer to stay with her niece for a while, but received a reply back that politely refused the offer. Three months later a second letter was sent to her aunt hysterically begging her to come. Arriving at her niece's house, which Mabel shared with two servants – hers and a nursemaid for her mentally-ill father-in-law – Miss Marple learned that the widow was the subject of gossip to the effect that she had murdered her husband, and no one in the area would now talk to her. Geoffrey had been taken ill in the night and died soon after the doctor arrived, but the old locum had not raised the alarm about the manner of death. It was thought that he had died after eating poisoned mushrooms. The two servants told Miss Marple that Denman had been unable to swallow and was rambling before he died about fish. An exhumation order was granted, followed by an autopsy that proved totally inconclusive. Miss Marple began to wonder if Geoffrey had committed suicide and used a knowledge of medicine gained in a previous period of his life to do so. Totally stumped by the problem, she was in the high street and in something of a silent prayer for guidance when she opened her eyes and saw a fresh haddock in the fishmonger's window with its characteristic black spots known as the "thumb mark of St. Peter". She realised that the solution lay in the mysterious words uttered by Geoffrey as he lay dying.

Questioning the servants further, they stated that the words were to do with a "heap" or "pile" of some fish whose name probably began with "c". Checking a list of poisons, Miss Marple found one called Pilocarpine and read that it is also an antidote for atropine poisoning. Based on her own eyedrops, which contain atropine sulphate, she confronted the elderly Mr Denman and accused him of murdering his son. The insane man laughingly confessed the crime, committed because he overheard that his son was planning to put him in an asylum. He emptied his eye solution into his son's bedside glass of water knowing Geoffrey would drink it during the night. Mr Denman is committed to an asylum after all and the Tuesday Club congratulates Miss Marple on her success, although Raymond points out there is one thing she doesn't know. His aunt corrects him – she knows that he proposed to Joyce earlier in the evening!

=== The Blue Geranium ===
A year has passed and Sir Henry Clithering is once again in St Mary Mead staying as a guest of Colonel Arthur Bantry and his wife, Dolly. Asked for suggestions as to a sixth person for dinner, he names Miss Marple and tells an incredulous Dolly of her success at solving last year's mysteries. Dolly wonders if the old lady could solve a ghost mystery of Arthur's. Miss Marple duly arrives at the Bantry home along with Sir Henry, an actress called Jane Helier, and Dr Lloyd. Arthur Bantry tells of a friend, George Pritchard, whose late wife was a difficult and cantankerous semi-invalid looked after by a succession of nurses. They changed regularly, unable to cope with their patient, with one exception called Nurse Copling who somehow managed the tantrums and complaints better than others of her calling.

Mrs Pritchard had a predilection for fortunetellers, and one day one who called herself Zarida came to the house when both George and Nurse Copling were out of the house on their separate business. Arriving back home, Mrs Pritchard told George that Zarida had declared the house to be "evil" and to avoid blue flowers. Two days later a letter arrived from the fortuneteller that said, "Beware of the Full Moon. The Blue Primrose means warning; the Blue Hollyhock means danger; the Blue Geranium means death." Four days later, one of the primroses in the pattern of the wallpaper in Mrs Pritchard's room changed colour to blue in the middle of the night, when there had been a full moon. A month went by with Mrs Pritchard counting down the days to the next full moon. Sure enough, the same thing happened, with a hollyhock on the wallpaper changing colour, although the door was locked.

Another month passed, with Nurse Copling and Pritchard growing increasingly nervous while Mrs Pritchard seems resigned. The morning after the next full moon, Mrs Pritchard was found dead in her bed, her smelling salts beside her, a faint smell of gas in the room and a geranium on the wallpaper turned blue. There was gossip following the death and an exhumation, but no clear result. Moreover, Zarida had disappeared and no one could properly trace how Mrs Pritchard had come to hear of her.

Once again Miss Marple has the solution. Having once seen a gardener mixing potassium cyanide with water to kill wasps, she was struck by how closely the solution resembled smelling salts. If such a solution had been substituted for the bottle Mrs Pritchard always kept by her, the cyanide would have killed her, but the gas would have covered the short-lived smell of almonds. The flowers on the wall were red litmus paper which the ammonia – as an alkali – in the true smelling salts turned blue. Nurse Copling, who was Zarida in disguise, was the killer, in the hopes (which did not come to pass) of marrying the widower Pritchard. Sir Henry confirms that Nurse Copling was recently arrested for a similar murder.

=== The Companion ===
Dr Lloyd is called upon to tell his story, and it begins in Las Palmas on the island of Gran Canaria. The doctor was living there for his health, and one night, in the principal hotel of the town, he caught sight of two middle-aged ladies, one slightly plump, one somewhat scraggy, whom he found out from a perusal of the hotel register were called Miss Mary Barton and Miss Amy Durrant, and who were tourists from England. The very next day, Dr Lloyd travelled to the other side of the island with friends for a picnic and, reaching the bay of Las Nieves, the group came upon the end of a tragedy: Miss Durrant had been swimming and got into trouble, and Miss Barton swam out to help her but to no avail; the other woman drowned. As part of the ensuing investigation, Miss Barton revealed that Miss Durrant was her companion of some five months. Dr Lloyd was puzzled by the claim made by one of the witnesses who swore that she saw Miss Barton holding Miss Durant's head under the water, not helping her, but the claim was dismissed as none of the other witnesses backed up the story. Dr Lloyd helped Miss Barton attempt to trace next-of-kin, but without success, and he also helped arrange the funeral, which took place on the island. Before she left Gran Canaria ten days later, Miss Barton asked Dr Lloyd several strange questions regarding the justification of taking the law into one's own hands. Miss Marple is interested to know if Miss Barton suddenly put on weight during this period and the doctor confirms that she had done so.

Some time later, Dr Lloyd read in the papers that Miss Barton drowned in Cornwall, although the body was never found. She left a suicide note which seemed to confess to some crime, and the inquest ruled that she was temporarily insane. Miss Marple, comparing the tale to that of a local fraudster called Mrs Trout, who claimed several dead people's old age pensions, states that "Miss Barton" was a clever criminal who drowned the other woman and then assumed her identity – hence the reason she looked fat – she was simply wearing the other person's clothes. The really significant fact was that the body in Cornwall was never found – this was another part of the deception.

Dr Lloyd confirms that he met the lady again coincidentally in Melbourne, Australia. Miss Barton was, in fact, Miss Durrant. Two tourists would not have been known to anyone, and no one realised who was the employer and who was the companion in Gran Canaria. The two women were cousins. Miss Durrant was the eldest of nine children in desperate straits, with some suffering ill-health. They wrote to their relative in England for help, but she refused due to a family quarrel from years earlier. Miss Durrant travelled to England under this assumed name and found employment with Miss Barton, whom she then killed and whose guise she adopted in Gran Canaria. Faking her death in Cornwall, she and her siblings inherited her money as next-of-kin. Dr Lloyd met with the Durrant family and realised the harm he would cause them by reporting their elder sister to the police for a crime for which he had little evidence. Six months later, Miss Durrant died.

=== The Four Suspects ===
Sir Henry Clithering tells his story, still a puzzle to him. There are four suspects, three of whom are therefore as much victims as the real victim in that they are under constant suspicion. It concerns a German secret society, the Schwartze Hand, started after the war, with methods and objectives similar to those of the Camorra. Dr Rosen, prominent in secret service work, penetrated the organisation and managed to bring about its downfall. Despite this success, he was a marked man and came to England, living in a cottage in Somerset, expecting he might be murdered. His household comprised his niece Greta; an old servant, Gertrud; a local gardener Dobbs; and Dr Rosen's secretary, Charles Templeton, whom Clithering reveals was one of his own men, put in the house to keep an eye on things (but possibly not totally above suspicion).

The tragedy occurred when Dr Rosen was found at the bottom of the stairs, possibly having fallen down, possibly having been pushed. The four people in the locked house were out at the time, but none can produce an alibi for the time of the death. In addition, no strangers were seen in the vicinity, where they would easily have stood out and been spotted, therefore one of the four must be guilty. One puzzle is how the killer received his or her instructions. The only people to come to the house that day were the butcher, the grocer's assistant, and the postman. The latter brought several letters for various members of the house, including a gardening catalogue and a letter for Charles Templeton which appeared to have been sent from relatives in Germany. Templeton ripped it up and threw it away. Of the letters the police were able to examine, the strangest was one addressed to Dr Rosen himself which was from someone called "Georgine" and mentioned several people of whom Rosen had never heard. Sir Henry shows the group the letter and Miss Marple wonders why the word "Honesty", which appears in the middle of a sentence, is written with a capital H.

Three months after the death of her uncle, Greta Rosen went back to Germany, but not before seeing Sir Henry and asking him to confirm that Charles was above suspicion. Sir Henry was unable to do so. Miss Marple and Mrs Bantry point out that the three people in the letter and the one place name, together with the word "Honesty", are all species of dahlias and that, rearranged, they spell "Death". This was the instruction to kill Dr Rosen, and it was sent to the intended victim himself to divert suspicion from the assassin. Receiving a letter from someone he did not know, he would naturally give it to the other people at the breakfast table to read, one being Charles, the secretary and natural suspect, but the other being his niece, the assassin. Her visit to Sir Henry to try and clear Charles's name was intended to have the opposite effect. Miss Marple also remembers, from her childhood German governess, that "Georgine" is German for "Dahlia", and that dahlias are symbolic of "Treachery and Misrepresentation". Miss Marple predicts that Greta being associated with criminals will come to a miserable end; Miss Marple also recommends to Sir Henry that he write a letter to Gertrud explaining she has been cleared of suspicion of murder.

=== A Christmas Tragedy ===
The ladies are prevailed upon to tell a story, and Miss Marple relates a tale from a time when she was staying at Keston Spa Hydro just before Christmas. Feeling that older and more experienced people's feelings and intuitions are too often easily dismissed when such feelings are based on facts and experience, she relates how, when she saw a couple called Jack and Gladys Sanders together, she just knew that the husband meant to murder his wife. The motive was money; they were living off her income but could not touch the capital in her lifetime, but she could will the money away and had done so in favour of her husband. Miss Marple's feelings were confirmed when she shared a tram ride with the couple and witnessed Mr Sanders "tripping" on the stairs onto his wife who then fell down, but was fortunately saved by the conductor.

The atmosphere of on-coming tragedy was heightened when the hall porter died from pneumonia, followed soon after by one of the hydro's housemaids who died of blood poisoning. Miss Marple dates the tragedy from when Mr Sanders overheard her and two other ladies talking about this latter death. His wife was out playing bridge with friends, and early in the evening Mr Sanders returned from a trip out with two of his friends and asked Miss Marple and the other ladies' opinions on an evening bag that he'd bought for his wife as a Christmas present. They went up to his room and saw the body of Mrs Sanders on the floor, felled by a sandbag. Immediately suspicious, Miss Marple refused to allow the husband to touch the body, and insisted the door be locked and the police called. Miss Marple noticed the woman's hat was lying beside the body, although previously she had been wearing it. Prompted by the police, she also noticed that the dead woman was no longer wearing earrings, as she had been when the body was first discovered. Mrs Sanders's other jewellery was missing, and the police were certain the thief came back after killing the woman and gained entry by means of the fire escape.

Mrs Sanders had been summoned back to the hydro from her bridge game by a mysterious telephone call, but her husband had a perfect alibi for the time in question, that is after she had left the bridge game but before the discovery of the body. It took Miss Marple two days to guess the truth; she then asked the police to try the discarded hat on the dead woman's head – it didn't fit. She realised that the body they saw and quickly locked in the room when they first discovered it was not that of Mrs Sanders, but that of the dead housemaid, which was awaiting collection by the undertakers. Sanders had put the body there when his wife was playing bridge, and then rushed into the grounds after the "discovery", supposedly overcome with grief. There he had met his wife returning from the game, summoned by him on the telephone using an alias, somehow persuaded her up to their room by means of the fire escape, killed her, and then swapped the clothes, returning the dead housemaid to her room. The one thing he couldn't do was put the hat back on his wife's head, as her shingled hair meant it didn't fit. The cheap hat they found was the property of the housemaid, as Mrs Sanders's hat cupboard was locked when her husband was placing the dead girl in his room, and a hat was needed to cover the face. Mr Sanders was hanged for his wife's murder.

=== The Herb of Death ===
A reluctant Mrs Bantry is prevailed upon to take her turn. She relates how she and her husband were guests of Sir Ambrose Bercy at his house at Clodderham Court. Sage leaves were picked from the garden for dinner that night, but unfortunately foxglove was growing among the sage, and it was also included in the stuffing for the meal of duck. All of the people at dinner were ill but one of them – Sir Ambrose's ward, Sylvia Keene – died. The inquest heard that death was due to poisoning by digitalis.

Among the party was a young man called Jerry Lorimer who was engaged to Sylvia, to the opposition of Sir Ambrose; but, after a year of the engagement, Sir Ambrose had given in. Also there was Maud Wye, supposedly a friend of Jerry, but Mrs Bantry had seen Jerry kissing her one evening. Six months after Sylvia's death, the two were married. Dr Lloyd is puzzled as a fatal poisoning by the use of foxglove leaves – if it was an accident – is difficult to achieve; the alkaloid has to be extracted with great care and Sir Henry latches onto the main problem of the case, namely: how do you ensure that only your victim dies if you poison everyone, including yourself (assuming the murderer to be one of the house party)?

It was Sylvia herself who picked the foxglove leaves and Dr Lloyd wonders if the intended victim was Sir Ambrose, who was prescribed drugs for his heart condition. Miss Marple latches onto this clue and finds the solution – Sir Ambrose's drug was digitalin. He planted the foxglove seed among the sage a long time before, and mild poisoning ensued at the dinner party, but somehow he fed his ward further doses at the same time from his own drug, thereby killing her but making it look like an accident. The motive was jealousy – he was in love with his ward and determined that she wouldn't marry Lorimer. Mrs Bantry confirms that she received a letter from Sir Ambrose after he died, to be posted to her in the event of his death, in which he confessed to the crime.

=== The Affair at the Bungalow ===
Jane Helier, the beautiful but somewhat vacuous actress, is the last to tell a story. Although she attempts to disguise the fact somewhat by using a false name, the others quickly realise that the story is about herself and, slipping up several times, she soon gives up the pretence and continues. She was on tour in a provincial town when she was summoned to a police station. There had been a burglary at a bungalow and a young man called Leslie Faulkener had been arrested. His story was that he was an unsuccessful playwright and had sent one of his efforts to Jane to read. She had written to him to say that she liked it and inviting him to come down to the bungalow to discuss it. He had gone, been shown in by the parlourmaid, met Jane, and drunk a cocktail. The next thing he knew, he was waking up by the roadside. He staggered along and was quickly picked up by the police.

The bungalow belonged to Sir Herman Cohen, a rich city gent, and in it he had installed his mistress. She was an actress called Mary Kerr, the wife of another actor, called Claude Leeson (although Jane admits these are not the people's real names). Someone calling herself Miss Kerr had rung up the police, told them the bungalow had been burgled, and described Leslie Faulkener as having visited there earlier that day, but having been refused admittance. He was later seen by a maid as gaining entrance through a window to steal Miss Kerr's jewellery. The police did indeed find the bungalow rifled and a large quantity of jewels missing. Miss Kerr soon returned but denied any knowledge of the affair or even of having rung up the police. Both she and the maid had been summoned away for the day on separate false pretexts and had never been in the bungalow when Mr Faulkener visited (whether by invitation or not). When Jane was brought face to face with Faulkener at the police station, he stated that this was not the woman he met at the bungalow, and the note was proven not to be in Jane's handwriting. Faulkener was released through lack of evidence. Sir Herman tried to hush the matter up but failed, and his wife started divorce proceedings when she found out about the affair with the actress.

The guests of the Bantrys try to guess the solution but fail, and are annoyed when Jane claims she does not know the true solution herself. The group disperses for the night, their six stories told, and Miss Marple whispers something in Jane's ear that causes the actress to cry out in shock. Later she confesses to Mrs Bantry that the story she told never happened, but Jane was thinking of carrying out such a scheme against an actress who enticed one of her previous husbands away from her. Jane and her understudy concocted the set-up. Miss Marple's warning was for Jane not to put herself at the mercy of the understudy, who may prove untrustworthy in the future. Jane decides not to proceed with the plan – there might be other Miss Marples out there who would find her out.

=== Death by Drowning ===
Some time has passed since the six people met at the Bantry home, and Sir Henry is once again a guest there when news reaches the house early one morning that a local girl called Rose Emmott has been found drowned in the river near to the mill. Local gossip was that she was pregnant by a young man called Rex Sandford, who is an architect from London, and the local feeling now is that she killed herself, unable to face her father with the truth.

Later in the morning, Sir Henry receives a visit from an upset Miss Marple who tells him that Rose was murdered, and she doesn't want the wrong man to be hanged for the crime. She tells him that while she believes she knows who the murderer is, she has no proof whatsoever. She asks him to investigate for her, just to see what he can make of it, and to attempt to discover if the person she suspects was involved or not. She writes the name of the suspect on a piece of paper and gives it to Sir Henry, who reads it and sets out to investigate.

With some reluctance, Sir Henry meets Melchett and Inspector Drewitt, who is investigating the case. By now the police know that the girl did not commit suicide, as bruises have been found on her upper arm where she was grabbed before being thrown in the river, and a small boy walking in the woods nearby on the evening before heard her cry and found her body. Sir Henry joins the two policemen as they continue their investigations. They meet Rose's father who runs the village pub. He definitely thinks Sandford is the murderer. They call on the architect, who confesses that he is the father of the unborn child and that he wrote a note to Rose, suggesting a meeting at the river, when she insisted on speaking with him. He walked through the woods near the river but failed to keep the appointment. He is told that he is the prime suspect in the case, and not to leave his house.

To wrap matters up, the three men visit the cottage of a widow, Mrs Bartlett, who has a young lodger, Joe Ellis, staying with her. This young man was besotted with Rose, and he states that he would have married Rose and brought up the baby as his own. At the time of the murder, he was putting up some shelves in Mrs Bartlett's kitchen and she can provide his alibi. At Sir Henry's insistence, they interview the small boy who heard the cry from Rose before she entered the water. He saw Sandford in the woods and thinks he also heard Joe Ellis whistling. He definitely saw two men with what seemed to be a wheelbarrow in the gathering dusk. Sir Henry, defeated in his attempt to clear Sandford, visits Miss Marple, who tells him Mrs Bartlett couldn't have been home on a Friday – the night in question. She takes in washing as extra income and on Fridays she takes it round in an old pram.

Sir Henry goes back to Mrs Bartlett's where Joe confesses to being in the woods, but denies hurting Rose. He then confronts Mrs Bartlett to the effect that she too was in the woods near the river. The "wheelbarrow" that was seen was the pram with the washing, and it was Mrs Bartlett who threw Rose in the water, as she herself was in love with Joe. Not wanting to see the young man hanged, she confesses, but is puzzled as to how Sir Henry knew. He recalls the note Miss Marple gave him, naming Mrs Bartlett as the murderer.

== Continuity ==
At the end of the sixth story ("The Thumb Mark of St. Peter"), Joyce Lemprière and Raymond West announce their engagement, but in later works involving Miss Marple, Raymond's wife is called Joan. Mr Petherick, another member of the first Tuesday club, returns in "Miss Marple Tells a Story", a short story included in Miss Marple's Final Cases and Two Other Stories.

Doctor Lloyd, a general practitioner in St Mary Mead and a guest at the Bantry's house, is never mentioned again. But Doctor Haydock, mentioned in passing in the last story ("Death by Drowning") becomes a mainstay of Miss Marple stories. Jane Helier, another guest of at the Bantry's, reappears in "The Case of the Buried Treasure", a short story first published in This Week Magazine in the US in November 1941, and in the UK in The Strand Magazine in July 1944. This story was published posthumously as "Strange Jest" in a short story collection titled Miss Marple's Final Cases and Two Other Stories.

== Literary significance and reception ==
The Times Literary Supplement (8 September 1932) stated, "It is easy to invent an improbable detective, like this elderly spinster who has spent all her life in one village, but by no means so easy to make her detections plausible. Sometimes Miss Marple comes dangerously near those detectives with a remarkable and almost superhuman intuition who solve every mystery as if they knew the answer beforehand, but this is not often and Mrs. Christie shows great skill in adapting her problems so that she can find analogies in Miss Marple's surroundings." The review concluded that "in general these are all problems to try the intellect rather than the nerves of the reader."

Isaac Anderson in The New York Times Book Review (5 March 1933) wrote: "The stories are slight in structure, but they present some very pretty problems and introduce us to some truly interesting people. Miss Marple ... is in a class by herself. She does not call herself a detective, but she could give almost any of the regular sleuths cards and spades and beat him at his own game."

The Scotsman of 6 June 1932 declared, "The stories are worthy alike of Mrs Christie's powers of invention, and of the 'Crime Club' series in which they are issued."

The Daily Mirror of 13 June 1932 said, "The plots are so good that one marvels at the prodigality which has been displayed, as most of them would have made a full-length thriller."

Robert Barnard: "Early Marple, in which she solves cases described by other amateur and professional murder buffs gathered in an ad hoc club. Some engaging stories, but the sedentary format (cf. Orczy's Old Man in the Corner stories) becomes monotonous over the book length. Contains one of Christie's few excursions into the working class, 'Death by Drowning'."

== References or allusions ==
=== References to other works ===
- In both "A Christmas Tragedy" and "The Herb of Death", Sir Henry Clithering calls Mrs Bantry "Scheherazade", the legendary storyteller of One Thousand and One Nights.

== Publication history ==
- 1932, Collins Crime Club (London), June 1932, Hardcover, 256 pp
- 1933, Dodd Mead and Company (New York), 1933, Hardcover, 253 pp
- 1943, Dell Books (New York), Paperback, (Dell number 8 [mapback])
- 1953, Penguin Books, Paperback, (Penguin number 929), 224 pp (under slightly revised title of Miss Marple and the Thirteen Problems)
- 1958, Avon Books (New York), Paperback (Avon number T245)
- 1961, Pan Books, Paperback (Great Pan G472), 186 pp
- 1963, Dell Books (New York), Paperback, 192 pp
- 1965, Fontana Books (Imprint of HarperCollins), Paperback, 192 pp
- 1968, Ulverscroft Large-print Edition, Hardcover, 207 pp; ISBN 0-85456-475-6
- 1972, Greenway edition of collected works (William Collins), Hardcover, 222 pp
- 1973, Greenway edition of collected works (Dodd Mead), Hardcover, 222 pp
- 2005, Marple Facsimile edition (Facsimile of 1932 UK first edition), 12 September 2005; Hardcover, ISBN 0-00-720843-X

=== First publication of stories ===
All but one of the stories (the exception being "The Four Suspects") first appeared in the UK in monthly fiction magazines. The first sequence of six stories appeared in The Royal Magazine – with illustrations for all the instalments by Gilbert Wilkinson – as follows:

- "The Tuesday Night Club" – first published in issue 350 in December 1927.
- "The Idol House of Astarte" – first published in issue 351 in January 1928.
- "Ingots of Gold" – first published in issue 352 in February 1928
- "The Blood-Stained Pavement" – first published in issue 353 in March 1928.
- "Motive versus Opportunity" – first published in issue 354 in April 1928.
- "The Thumb Mark of St. Peter" – first published in issue 355 in May 1928.

After eighteen months, the second sequence of stories appeared, in a slightly different order to the book collection, and un-illustrated, in The Story-Teller Magazine as follows:

- "The Blue Geranium" – first published in issue 272 in December 1929.
- "A Christmas Tragedy" – first published under the alternative title of "The Hat and the Alibi" in issue 273 in January 1930.
- "The Companion" – first published under the alternative title of "The Resurrection of Amy Durrant" in issue 274 in February 1930.
- "The Herb of Death" – first published in issue 275 in March 1930.
- "The Four Suspects" – first published in issue 276 in April 1930.
- "The Affair at the Bungalow" – first published in issue 277 in May 1930.

The final story in the book, "Death by Drowning", was first published in issue 462 of Nash's Pall Mall Magazine in November 1931, with illustrations by J.A. May. In the United States, the first six stories appeared in Detective Story Magazine in 1928, with uncredited illustrations, as follows:

- "The Tuesday Night Club" – first published in Volume 101, Number 5 on 2 June under the title "The Solving Six".
- "The Idol House of Astarte" – first published in Volume 101, Number 6 on 9 June under the title "The Solving Six and the Evil Hour".
- "Ingots of Gold" – first published in Volume 102, Number 1 on 16 June under the title "The Solving Six and the Golden Grave".
- "The Blood-Stained Pavement" – first published in Volume 102, Number 2 on 23 June under the title "Drip! Drip!"
- "Motive versus Opportunity" – first published in Volume 102, Number 3 on 30 June under the title "Where's the Catch?"
- "The Thumb Mark of St. Peter" – first published in Volume 102, Number 4 on 7 July under its original title.

"The Four Suspects" received its first true publication in the US in the January 1930 issue (Volume 31, Number 4) of Pictorical Review. The same magazine also printed "The Blue Geranium" in February 1930 (Volume 31, Number 5) and "The Companion" in March 1930 (Volume 31, Number 6) under the slightly revised title of "Companions". These three instalments were illustrated by De Alton Valentine. "The Tuesday Night Club" short story received its first book publication in the anthology The Best Detective Stories of the Year 1928, edited by Ronald Knox and H. Harrington and published in the UK by Faber and Faber in 1929 and in the US by Horace Liveright in the same year under the slightly amended title of The Best English Detective Stories of 1928.

The storyline of "The Companion" was later expanded and reworked into a full-length novel, published as A Murder is Announced, the fourth novel to feature Miss Marple.

=== Book dedication ===
The dedication of the book reads:
"To Leonard and Katharine Woolley"

Leonard Woolley (1880–1960), knighted in 1935, was a famous British archaeologist who was in the middle of several seasons excavating the ancient city of Ur when he and his wife Katharine (1888–1945) met Christie in 1928. She was on a solo trip to the Middle East following the painful divorce from her first husband, Archibald Christie. Having read in the Illustrated London News about the progress of the dig, she made a visit there and, unusually for the Woolleys, was made welcome. This special treatment was entirely due to Katharine's admiration for Christie's 1926 novel The Murder of Roger Ackroyd. The situation was further unusual in that Katharine was not a woman that other women found easy to get on with. Incredibly self-centred and difficult, she preferred to surround herself with men whom she then expected would accede to her demands and whims, such as brushing her hair or walking miles to purchase her favourite confectionery, which she would then eat in one sitting, making her sick. She was described by Gertrude Bell as "dangerous". Katharine's marriage to Leonard was a second marriage for her, her first husband having committed suicide within six months of the marriage in 1919. Christie met her second husband, Max Mallowan, on their dig in 1930 when she returned there, having formed a somewhat fragile relationship with the Woolleys. Max and Agatha's romance required very careful handling as far as the Woolleys were concerned, as they could easily have damaged Max's career. They accepted the news of the engagement, but made Max work to the last moment before the wedding, and refused to allow Agatha to travel with Max to the dig the first season after their marriage, as they had a rule that wives were not allowed. Fortunately, it was Max's last dig with the Woolleys. Christie refers to this incident in Death in the Clouds (1935) and, even more pointedly, based the character of the doomed, unstable Louise Leidner in Murder in Mesopotamia (1936) on Katharine.

=== Dustjacket blurb ===
The blurb on the inside flap of the dustjacket of the first edition (which is also repeated opposite the title page) reads:

The appearance of Miss Marple in Murder at the Vicarage provided detective fiction with a new and distinctive character. Miss Marple, that delightfully clever village spinster who solves the most amazing mysteries quietly and unobtrusively from her chair by the fireside, appears in each of the stories comprising The Thirteen Problems. Each story is a little masterpiece of detection, clever and ingenious, with just that added twist that only Agatha Christie can give.

== Television adaptations ==
Five of these short stories have been adapted for television; "The Blue Geranium" has been adapted twice.

Elements from "The Thumb Mark of Saint Peter" were combined with "Greenshaw's Folly" for the sixth series of Agatha Christie's Marple, starring Julia McKenzie, first airing 20 June 2013.

"The Blue Geranium" was adapted for the fifth series of Agatha Christie's Marple, starring Julia McKenzie, first aired 27 June 2010. The adaptation was considerably embellished from the short story, but still keeps to the core story line.

Elements from "The Herb of Death" were woven into the Agatha Christie's Marple adaptation of The Secret of Chimneys, starring Julia McKenzie, which first aired 20 June 2010. The Secret of Chimneys originally featured Superintendent Battle as the detective; Miss Marple was not a character in the novel.

Anime adaptations were done for three of these short stories ("Ingots of Gold", "The Blue Geranium" and "Motive versus Opportunity") as episodes of the Japanese animated television series Agatha Christie's Great Detectives Poirot and Marple, airing in 2004 and 2005.
