= Sayuri Ichiishi =

Japanese animator

- 一石小百合
- Born: January 1, 1964 (age 62); Kanagawa Prefecture
- Occupation: Character designer
- Known for: Pokémon character design

Sayuri Ichiishi (一石小百合, Ichiishi Sayuri; born January 1, 1964 in Kanagawa Prefecture) is the lead anime character designer for the Pokémon anime series, although she has worked on other animation titles. Her work closely follows Ken Sugimori to transfer Pokémon and Ken's characters into the anime. Sayuri also designs characters exclusive to the anime.

== Works ==
- Pokémon (TV): Character design
- Pokémon: The First Movie: Character design
- Pokémon: The Movie 2000: Character design
- Pokémon 3: The Movie: Character design
- Pokémon 4Ever: Character design
- Pokémon Heroes: Character design
- Pokémon: Jirachi Wish Maker: Character design
- Pokémon: Destiny Deoxys: Character design
- Pokémon: Lucario and the Mystery of Mew: Character design
- Pokémon Ranger and the Temple of the Sea: Character design
- Agatha Christie's Great Detectives Poirot and Marple: Character design
- Ushio & Tora: Comically Deformed Theater: Character design
