= They Do It with Mirrors =

1952 mystery novel by Agatha Christie

- First edition (US)
- Author: Agatha Christie
- Cover artist: Not known
- Language: English
- Series: Miss Marple novels
- Genre: Crime
- Publisher: Dodd, Mead and Company
- Publication date: 1952
- Publication place: United Kingdom
- Media type: Print (hardback & paperback)
- Pages: 187 first edition, hardback
- Preceded by: A Murder Is Announced
- Followed by: A Pocket Full of Rye

They Do It with Mirrors is a mystery novel by British writer Agatha Christie, first published in the US by Dodd, Mead and Company in 1952 under the title of Murder with Mirrors and in UK by the Collins Crime Club on 17 November that year under Christie's original title. The US edition retailed at $2.50 and the UK edition at ten shillings and sixpence (10/6). The book features her detective Miss Marple.

== Plot ==
While visiting her American school friend Ruth Van Rydock in London, Miss Jane Marple learns that Ruth is seriously concerned for her sister Carrie Louise Serrocold, whose home is Stonygates, an aging English Victorian mansion. Carrie Louise's third husband, Lewis, an enthusiast for the charitable treatment of juvenile delinquents, runs a facility in a neighbouring building for rehabilitating delinquent boys.

Miss Marple agrees to visit. When she arrives, she finds that several members of the Serrocold family are also visiting, including Carrie Louise's widowed and estranged younger daughter (Mildred Strete), her stepson from her second marriage (Stephen Restarick), and her granddaughter (Gina Hudd) who has brought with her her American husband (Walter Hudd). Also present are Juliet "Jolly" Bellever, housekeeper and companion to Carrie Louise, and Edgar Lawson, young secretary to Lewis Serrocold, who appears to be showing clear signs of paranoid schizophrenia. Miss Marple learns that Carrie Louise has experienced some health problems, but is still the sweet, idealistic, and loving person that she had known when they were friends at school.

Christian Gulbrandson, Carrie Louise's stepson from her first marriage and the executor of the vast Gulbrandson Trust, arrives unexpectedly. Lewis Serrocold talks to Christian on the terrace. Miss Marple watches them through her bird-watcher's binoculars, and overhears them discussing the importance of keeping a problem from Carrie Louise, and of the need to seek outside advice. Both men appear for dinner, after which Christian retires to his room to write letters.

When the rest of the family is gathered in the sitting room listening to Stephen playing the piano, Edgar Lawson unexpectedly enters with Walter Hudd's revolver, claiming that Lewis is his father and has treated him badly. The solicitous Lewis guides Edgar into his office; from the other side of the locked door, the family hear Lawson ranting to Lewis, who responds calmly. The lights fuse, leaving the room in darkness and Walter leaves to try to find the fuse box. Shots are heard from inside Lewis's office, and the family try to break down the door. Another shot, some distance away, is also heard by some members of the family. When the door to the office is finally opened, Lewis, out of breath, insists that Lawson meant no real harm, as the shots he had fired merely hit the wall. Lawson collapses in tears, and apologises.

Jolly Bellever, who had left to find the key to Lewis's office, returns and announces that she has discovered Christian Gulbrandson shot dead at his writing desk. Lewis proceeds to Christian's room, followed by Carrie Louise and Miss Marple. Stephen's brother Alexis Restarick, who knows nothing of the previous events and is coming to visit Carrie Louise, arrives at the house just before the police arrive.

Inspector Curry quickly establishes that none of the people from the facility for delinquent boys is involved, nor any of the servants. Learning from Jolly that there had been paper in Christian's typewriter, Curry interrogates Lewis, who admits he removed the sheet for fear his wife should see it. The typed text suggests that Christian was afraid to tell Carrie Louise something, with the last sentence suggesting she may be being systematically poisoned. Lewis suggests the police analyze his wife's medicine, which is later proved to contain small amounts of arsenic.

Miss Marple comments that most of the family would be pleased if the outsider Walter were found to be the killer, but Edgar had had Walter's gun at the relevant time. The police later find the murder weapon inside the piano stool. Alexis explains that his drive to the house was slowed by the fog, and that what he saw and heard in the fog – a shot and the sound of someone running – reminded him of a stage set. His experience causes Miss Marple to begin thinking differently about the murder. The next evening, Alexis and one of the delinquents, Ernie Gregg, are killed by a falling stage curtain counterweight.

Miss Marple explains to the police how one person, for example Lewis Serrocold, could have run from Lewis's study to Christian's room along the terrace in under two minutes. Lawson, who really is Lewis's illegitimate son and has only been playing the part of a mental patient, had behind the locked door spoken both as himself and as Lewis, while Lewis had run to Christian's study, killed him, and returned out of breath. Lewis had later planted the arsenic and had altered Christian's letter to disguise the real reason for Christian Gulbrandsen's visit: his knowledge that Lewis was embezzling from the Gulbrandsen Trust. Lewis had later killed Alexis and Ernie because he believed they might have witnessed something on the night of the murder.

When confronted by the police, Lawson flees the house and escapes across the lake in an old boat. The boat begins to sink, and Lewis jumps into the lake to rescue his son. Both are caught in the weeds, and drown before the police can reach them. Carrie Louise and her daughter Mildred return to the house. Previously estranged, the incident has caused them to realise how much they need each other. Gina and Walter Hudd return to the United States together.

== Principal characters ==
- Miss Marple: astute amateur sleuth.
- Ruth Van Rydock: old school friend of Miss Marple, an American socialite.
- Carrie Louise Serrocold: Ruth's younger sister, and a school friend of Miss Marple.
- Lewis Serrocold: Carrie Louise's third husband, once an accountant and now an enthusiast for the charitable treatment of juvenile delinquents.
- Gina Hudd: granddaughter of Carrie Louise from her first marriage. Her mother was Pippa, the adopted daughter of Carrie Louise and her first husband, Eric Gulbrandsen.
- Walter Hudd: American husband of Gina.
- Mildred Strete: Pippa's sister and the only child born to Carrie Louise and her first husband, Mr Gulbrandsen. Widowed a few years before the story begins.
- Juliet Bellever: called Jolly, she is Carrie Louise's secretary and companion.
- Stephen Restarick: son of Carrie Louise's second husband, who has since childhood considered Carrie Louise as a mother. He works in the theatre, helping often with the delinquents to stage plays there. He loves Gina.
- Alexis Restarick: Steven's older brother who views Carrie Louise affectionately. He also loves Gina and works in the theatre.
- Christian Gulbrandsen: son of Carrie Louise's first husband, and half brother to Mildred. He is on the board of the Gulbrandsen family trust, periodically visiting at the house for meetings of the board. He is the first murder victim.
- Edgar Lawson: one of the delinquents, arrived about a month before the story begins. Works closely with Lewis Serrocold.
- Dr Maverick: chief psychiatrist for the juvenile delinquents programme.
- Ernie Gregg: one of the delinquents who is active in the theatre work.
- Inspector Curry: leads the police investigation of the first murder.
- Detective Sergeant Lake: assists Curry in the investigation at Stonygates.

== Title ==
In the text, Miss Marple says "they do it with mirrors": this is the slang term for the illusions of magicians and of a stage set. It is thinking of that which leads her to looking a new way at the evening of the first murder.

== Literary significance and reception ==
Maurice Richardson of The Observer of 30 November 1952 summed up thus: "First half is lively and the trick alibi for the murder of the stepson neat enough; there is a marked decline in sprightliness later on, but half a shot is better than no dope."

Robert Barnard said of this novel that its setting was: "Unusual (and not entirely convincing) setting of delinquent's home, full of untrustworthy adolescents and untrustworthy do-gooders. Christie not entirely at home, perhaps because she believes (in Miss Marple's words) that 'young people with a good heredity, and brought up wisely in a good home…they are really…the sort of people a country needs.' Otherwise highly traditional, with houseplans, Marsh-y inquisitions, and second and third murders done most perfunctorily." He summed it up as showing "Definite signs of decline."

== Publication history ==
A condensed version of the novel was first published in the US in Cosmopolitan magazine in the issue for April 1952 (Volume 132, Number 4) under the title Murder With Mirrors with illustrations by Joe Bowler. In the UK the novel was first serialised in the weekly magazine John Bull in six abridged instalments from 26 April (Volume 91, Number 2391) to 31 May 1952 (Volume 91, Number 2396) with illustrations by George Ditton.

== Adaptations ==
Several adaptations were made of the book for TV and Film.

Some elements of the story were incorporated into the 1964 film Murder Ahoy!, which starred Margaret Rutherford as Miss Marple, along with a token tribute to The Mousetrap. The novel's first proper adaptation was the 1985 television film Murder with Mirrors with Sir John Mills as Lewis Serrocold, Bette Davis as Carrie Louise, Tim Roth as Edgar Lawson and Helen Hayes as Miss Marple.

A second adaptation was aired on 29 December 1991 in the BBC series Miss Marple starring Joan Hickson as Miss Marple, Jean Simmons as Carrie-Louise Serrocold, Joss Ackland as Lewis Serrocold and Faith Brook as Ruth van Rydock. Real-life brothers Jay and Christopher Villiers portray the Restarick brothers.

A third adaptation was aired on 1 January 2010 for the fourth season of the ITV series Agatha Christie's Marple, starring Julia McKenzie as Miss Marple, Penelope Wilton as Carrie Louise, Brian Cox as Lewis Serrocold, and Joan Collins as Ruth Van Rydock.

There is a French television production aired in 2013, as part of the television series Les Petits Meurtres d'Agatha Christie (season two, episode one). The episode is titled "Jeux de glaces", which can mean "Game of Mirrors".
