= A Murder Is Announced =

1950 mystery novel by Agatha Christie

- First edition (UK)
- Author: Agatha Christie
- Language: English
- Series: Miss Marple novels
- Genre: Crime novel
- Publisher: Collins Crime Club
- Publication date: June 1950
- Publication place: United Kingdom
- Pages: 256 (first edition, hardcover)
- Preceded by: The Moving Finger
- Followed by: They Do It with Mirrors

A Murder Is Announced is a mystery novel by Agatha Christie, first published in the UK by the Collins Crime Club in June 1950 and in the US by Dodd, Mead and Company in the same month. The UK edition sold for eight shillings and sixpence (8/6) and the US edition at $2.50.

The novel features her detective Jane Marple. The murder is announced in advance in a local newspaper in a small village; Miss Marple is staying at a spa hotel in a nearby town for treatment. She works with Inspector Craddock of the county police.

The novel was well received at publication. Remarks included: "The plot is as ingenious as ever, the writing more careful, the dialogue both wise and witty"; "Not quite one of her top notchers, but very smooth entertainment"; the murderer was "run to earth in a brilliantly conducted parlour game".; and "This jubilee whodunit is as deft and ingenious a fabrication as Agatha Christie has contrived in many a year." A later review was more mixed: "Superb reworking of the standard Christie setting and procedures, marred only by an excess of homicide at the end."

The book was heavily promoted upon publication in 1950 as being Christie's fiftieth book, for example the first UK edition stated "For the fiftieth time the Queen of detection defies her readers", although this figure could only be arrived at by counting in both UK and US short story collections.

This was the last of Christie's editions to feature a pictorial dust-jacket, as she "preferred jackets without images that conflicted with her view of the contents."

== Plot ==
A notice appears in Chipping Cleghorn's local newspaper announcing a forthcoming murder, and giving the place and time. Intrigued, curious villagers start to arrive at Letitia Blacklock's home, Little Paddocks, including neighbours Miss Hinchcliffe and her friend Amy Murgatroyd. Also present are Patrick and his sister Julia Simmons, guests at the house, the young widow Phillipa Haymes, and Edmund Swettenham, another neighbour who is in love with Phillipa.

At 6.30 exactly, the lights go out in the parlour, and a masked man waving a blindingly-bright torch appears in the doorway and shouts "Stick 'em up!" Shots are fired, and when the lights are restored Miss Blacklock is bleeding from the ear and the man lies dead. Miss Blacklock's companion, Bunny, recognises him as Rudi Scherz, a Swiss worker at a local hotel.

Miss Marple joins Inspector Craddock in investigating. Scherz's girlfriend says that Scherz had been paid by an unknown person to stage a fake hold-up. He had no gun. The discovery of oil on the hinges of a normally-locked second parlour door suggests that one of the guests might have slipped out and come round behind Scherz to shoot.

The individuals with an obvious motive for wanting to kill Miss Blacklock are twins, Pip and Emma, whose uncle was Miss Blacklock's wealthy former employer Randall Goedler. On his death, Goedler's wealth passed to his wife Belle, and on her death (expected to happen soon), Miss Blacklock will inherit. However, if she dies before Belle, the estate will pass to the twins. Craddock travels to Scotland and learns from Belle that nobody has heard from Emma and Pip for many years. Belle chats about Letitia's sister Charlotte, who had had a goitre. Letitia had given up her job with Goedler to take her sister to Switzerland for surgery; Charlotte had died there suddenly, leaving Letitia to return to England alone.

Miss Marple takes tea with Bunny. She is just telling Miss Marple that a pair of decorative lamps in the house had been switched when Miss Blacklock arrives and interrupts their tête-à-tête. The next morning, Bunny is found dead, poisoned. Craddock passes to Miss Marple copies of old letters from Letitia to Charlotte. She compares them to a modern letter, and finds them interesting. On hearing from the real Julia Simmons, Miss Blacklock confronts her house guest Julia, who admits that she is in fact Emma. However, she denies murder.

Talking with Miss Hinchcliffe, Amy Murgatroyd realises that, from her position behind the door, she was the only person not blinded by the torch. She is struggling to recall who she could see, when her friend is called away. As Miss Hinchcliffe drives off, Amy shouts after her "She wasn't THERE!" Shortly after her friend leaves, Amy is strangled.

Craddock and Miss Marple gather everyone at Little Paddocks. Having previously made private arrangements with Edmund and with Mitzi the cook to act parts, they elicit a confession from Phillipa that she is really Pip. After Mitzi claims that she had actually seen Miss Blacklock shoot Scherz, Miss Blacklock leaves the room. Screams are heard, and Miss Blacklock is found attempting to drown Mitzi in the kitchen sink.

Miss Marple explains that it was actually Letitia, not Charlotte, who had died in Switzerland. Charlotte posed as Letitia and returned to England, covering the scar on her throat with strings of pearls. Rudi Scherz had recognized her, having worked at the Swiss hospital where she had her surgery, leading her to devise a plot to silence him.

Charlotte had shorted the frayed cord of a lamp by pouring water on it, plunging the room into darkness. She then came behind Scherz and shot him, cutting her own ear with nail scissors. She later replaced the lamp with its pair. Bunny had known both sisters from childhood, and Charlotte had taken Bunny into her confidence about the impersonation but not the plot. Fearful that Bunny might reveal the truth, Charlotte poisoned her. Amy had realised that Miss Blacklock was the one person whose face was not illuminated by Rudi Scherz's torch. Charlotte had heard Amy shout, and killed her as soon as Miss Hinchcliffe had left.

Ultimately, Pip and Emma inherit the Goedler fortune, and Edmund and Phillipa marry.

== Principal characters ==
- Miss Jane Marple, an elderly spinster and amateur detective

Residents of Chipping Cleghorn

- Letitia Blacklock, aging landlady of 'Little Paddocks', formerly secretary to Randall Goedler
- Dora Bunner ("Bunny"), Letitia's fluttery childhood friend
- Patrick Simmons, Miss Blacklock's young cousin
- Julia Simmons, sister of Patrick
- Mitzi, Miss Blacklock's foreign housekeeper and cook, a young refugee from Europe
- Phillipa Haymes, a lodger at Little Paddocks
- Colonel Archie Easterbrook, old colonel just returned from India
- Laura Easterbrook, his younger, glamorous wife
- Mrs Swettenham, widow who dotes on her grown son, Edmund
- Edmund Swettenham, cynical young writer who is in love with Phillipa
- Miss Hinchcliffe, woman who farms locally on a small scale
- Miss Amy Murgatroyd, Miss Hinchcliffe's sweet-dispositioned, giggly friend
- Julian Harmon, vicar of Chipping Cleghorn
- Diana "Bunch" Harmon, the vicar's wife, daughter of a good friend of Miss Marple

Other characters

- Myrna Harris, Scherz's girlfriend, waitress at local hotel
- Rudi Scherz, Swiss receptionist at a local hotel and small time thief
- Belle Goedler, dying widow of Randall Goedler
- Pip and Emma Stamfordis, twin children of Randall Goedler's sister Sonia, alternate heirs
- Captain Ronald Haymes, estranged husband of Phillipa, said to have died in the war

Police

- Inspector Dermot Craddock, lead detective on the case
- Sir Henry Clithering, retired head of Scotland Yard. He is godfather to Craddock
- Chief Constable George Rydesdale, chief of the county investigation, Craddock's superior
- Detective Sergeant Fletcher, assisting Craddock
- Constable Legg

== Setting ==
This novel is set just after World War II. Characters in the novel are still dealing with food rationing and the laws supporting it (which ended in 1954). This complicates communication with the police, as people in the village use barter as well as the coupons to get the food items they need. The connections among people in a village, and the extent to which they know and accept people new to the village, form an important aspect of this novel.

== Literary significance and reception ==
Julian MacLaren-Ross in The Times Literary Supplement was lavish in his praise of the book, after five years of not reviewing any of Christie's detective novels: "A new novel by Mrs Agatha Christie always deserves to be placed at the head of any list of detective fiction and her fiftieth book, A Murder is Announced, establishes firmly her claim to the throne of detection. The plot is as ingenious as ever, the writing more careful, the dialogue both wise and witty; while suspense is engendered from the very start, and maintained skilfully until the final revelation: it will be a clever reader indeed who anticipates this, and though Miss Christie is as usual scrupulously fair in scattering her clues, close attention to the text is necessary if a correct solution of the mystery is to be arrived at before the astute Miss Marple unmasks the culprit." The review concluded, "Miss Christie has several surprises up her sleeve besides the main one, and (this much may be said without spoiling the reader's pleasure) she once again breaks new ground by creating a weak and kindly murderer who is yet responsible for the deaths of three people: that such a character should, in the last analysis, seem credible, is a tribute to the author's psychological acumen and originality of concept."

Maurice Richardson, in the 4 June 1950 issue of The Observer, said, "For her fiftieth book she has chosen a snug, residential village setting with her favourite detective, silver-haired, needle-sharp spinster, Miss Marple, making a delayed appearance. Not quite one of her top notchers, but very smooth entertainment. The Prime Minister (Clement Attlee), who is her fervent admirer, might fittingly celebrate this jubilee by making her a Dame." (It took until 1971 for Christie to be awarded the DBE).

Norman Shrapnel in The Guardian's issue of 9 June 1950 noted that this was Christie's 50th book and said that the murderer was "run to earth in a brilliantly conducted parlour game".

An unnamed reviewer in the Toronto Daily Star of 30 September 1950 opined that "A Murder is Announced displays all the adroit and well-bred legerdemain one has come to expect from Agatha Christie... This jubilee whodunit is as deft and ingenious a fabrication as Agatha Christie has contrived in many a year."

Robert Barnard: "Superb reworking of the standard Christie setting and procedures, marred only by an excess of homicide at the end. The book is distantly related to "The Companion", in The Thirteen Problems."

In the "Binge!" article of Entertainment Weekly Issue #1343–44 (26 December 2014 – 3 January 2015), the writers picked A Murder Is Announced as an "EW favorite" on the list of the "Nine Great Christie Novels".

== Publication history ==
The novel was serialised in eleven parts in the Daily Express from Tuesday 28 February to Saturday 11 March 1950. Five instalments carried an illustration by long-term Express artist Andrew Robb. This version did not contain any chapter divisions and contained only about half of the text that appeared in the book publication, totally omitting chapters five, six, seven, fourteen and the epilogue. It had been planned for this serialisation to take place closer to the eventual book publication in June 1950 but it was pulled forward by Christie's literary agent Edmund Cork in an effort to boost interest at the ailing box office for the play Murder at the Vicarage.

In the US, the first serial publication was in the Chicago Tribune in forty-nine parts from Monday 17 April to Monday 12 June 1950.

The book was heavily promoted upon publication in 1950 as being Christie's fiftieth book, a jubilee publication, although this figure was only arrived at by counting in both UK and US short story collections.

== Adaptations ==
=== Television ===
The NBC anthology series Goodyear Playhouse broadcast an adaptation by William Templeton on 30 December 1956, with Gracie Fields as Miss Marple, Roger Moore as Patrick Simmons and Jessica Tandy as Letitia Blacklock.

A 1984 adaptation by Alan Plater starred Joan Hickson as Miss Marple and Ursula Howells as Miss Blacklock. It was directed by David Giles for the BBC series Miss Marple.

A 2005 adaptation for the ITV series Agatha Christie's Marple featured Geraldine McEwan as Miss Marple, Zoë Wanamaker as Letitia Blacklock, Keeley Hawes as Phillipa Haymes, Elaine Paige as Dora Bunner, Frances Barber as Hinchcliffe, Cherie Lunghi as Sadie Swettenham, Sienna Guillory as Julia Simmons, Catherine Tate as Mitzi and Alexander Armstrong as Inspector Craddock.

Non-English adaptations have included a 2015 episode of the French television series Les Petits Meurtres d'Agatha Christie, the 2018 Korean television series, Ms. Ma, Nemesis, and a 2019 Japanese version Drama Special: Agatha Christie's A Murder Is Announced (Japanese: ドラマスペシャル アガサ・クリスティ 予告殺人).

=== Radio ===
The novel was adapted for BBC radio by Michael Bakewell, with June Whitfield as Miss Marple and Sarah Lawson as Miss Blacklock, in five half-hour episodes. It was broadcast on BBC Radio 4 in August 1999.

=== Theatrical ===
Leslie Darbon adapted the novel into a stage play in 1977. It was first presented at the Theatre Royal, Brighton, by Peter Saunders – who brought Christie's The Mousetrap to the stage – and then on 21 September 1977 at the Vaudeville Theatre, London, which at the time he owned.

The play toured Australia in 2013 with Judi Farr as Miss Marple, Robert Grubb as Inspector Craddock and Libby Munro as Phillipa Haymes, directed by Darren Yap.
