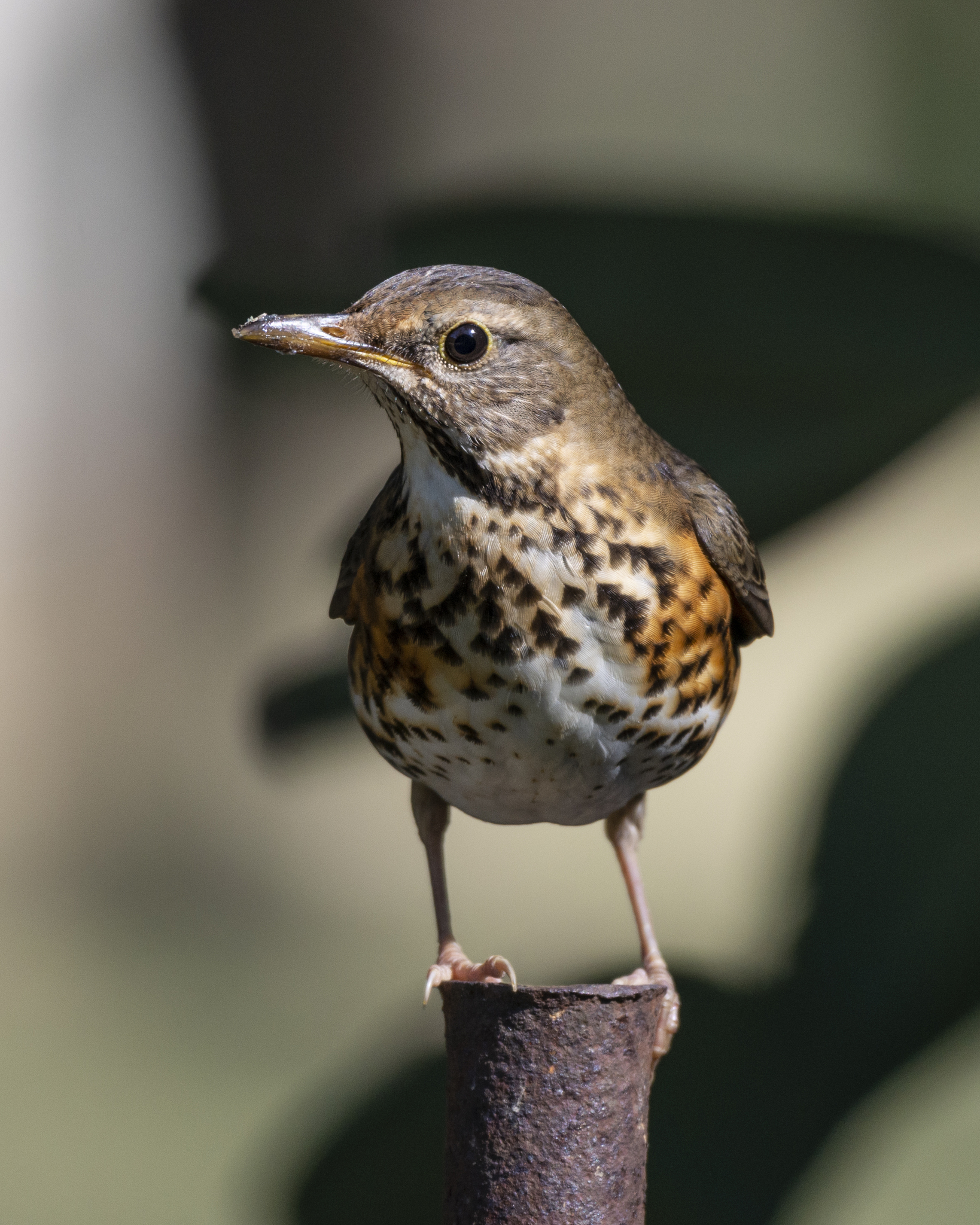

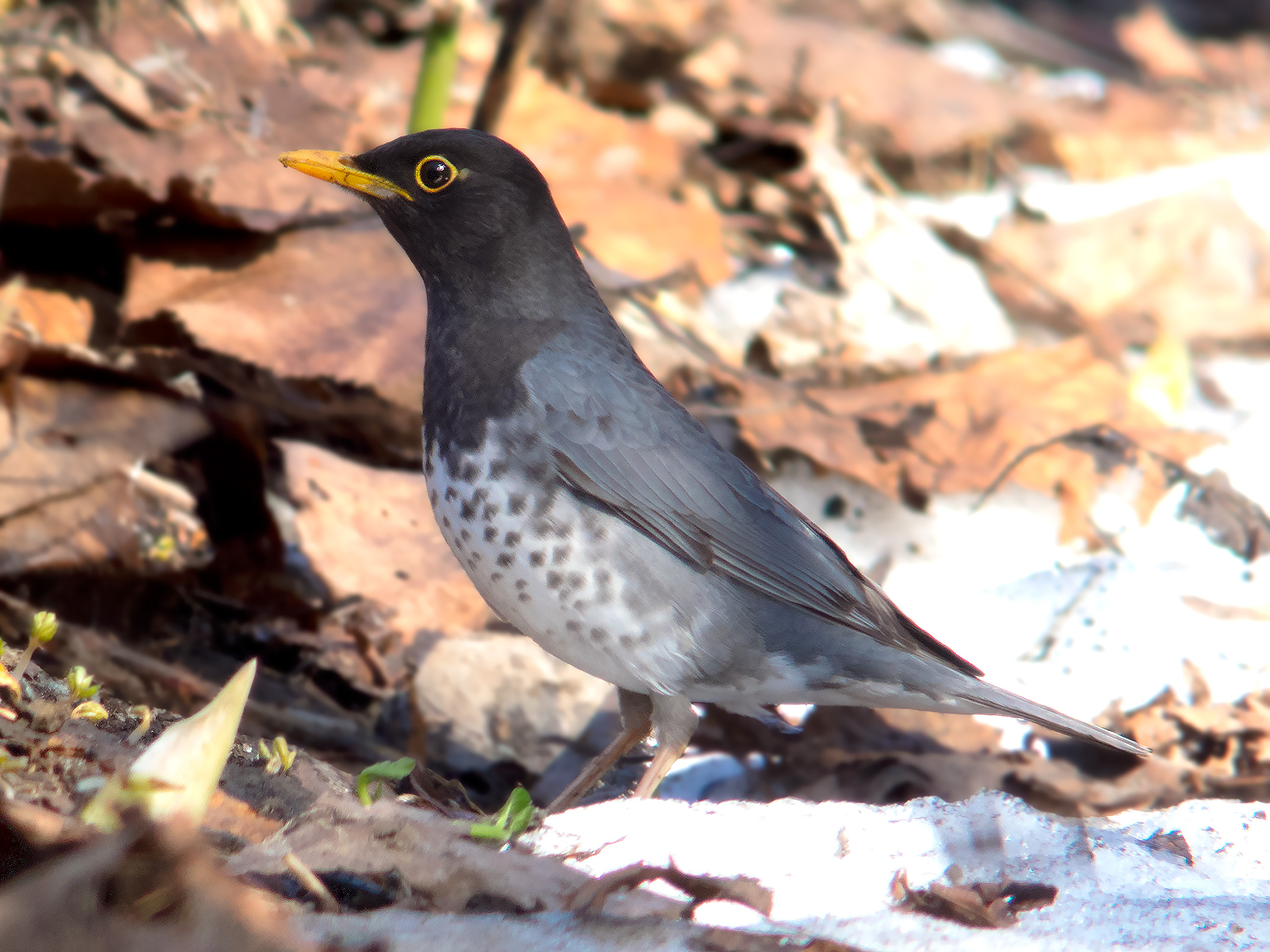
- Female above, male below

Conservation status
- Least Concern (IUCN 3.1)

Scientific classification
- Kingdom: Animalia
- Phylum: Chordata
- Class: Aves
- Order: Passeriformes
- Family: Turdidae
- Genus: Turdus
- Species: T. cardis

Binomial name
- Turdus cardis Temminck, 1831

= Japanese thrush =

Species of bird

The Japanese thrush (Turdus cardis) is a species of bird in the thrush family Turdidae. The species is also known as the grey thrush or the Japanese grey thrush. The species was once split into two subspecies, with birds breeding in China being treated as the subspecies T. c. lateus,, but today differences are attributed to natural variation and the species is treated as being monotypic.

The Japanese thrush is migratory. It breeds in central China and Japan, arriving in Japan by April or May; it winters in coastal southern China (including Hainan) and northern Laos and Vietnam leaving its breeding grounds around October. It occasionally turns up as a passage migrant in Taiwan, and has been vagrant in Thailand. The species is usually found in forests and woodlands, either deciduous or mixed deciduous and coniferous in its breeding habitat, but also secondary forest and even gardens and parks.

The Japanese thrush is a mid-sized thrush. The two sexes have different plumage (sexual dimorphism). The male has a black head, breast, back, wings and tail, and a white underside with black spots in the upper belly and flanks. The legs, bill and thin eye-ring are yellow. The female is brown above and has a white throat, breast and belly, washed with rusty orange on the flanks and black spots.

The Japanese thrush feeds on the ground, scratching through leaf-litter to find insects and earthworms. It will also take fruit. It lays 2-5 eggs in a nest made of twigs and moss, bound with mud and lined with hair and rootlets. The eggs are incubated for 12–13 days and the chick nestling period is 14 days. The species double broods (raising two broods a season), with the female laying a new clutch soon after the first brood fledges.
