= At Bertram's Hotel =

1965 mystery novel by Agatha Christie

- First edition (UK)
- Author: Agatha Christie
- Cover artist: Brian Russell
- Language: English
- Series: Miss Marple novels
- Genre: Crime novel
- Publisher: Collins Crime Club
- Publication date: 15 November 1965
- Publication place: United Kingdom
- Media type: Print (hardback & paperback)
- Pages: 256 (first edition, hardcover)
- Preceded by: A Caribbean Mystery
- Followed by: Nemesis

At Bertram's Hotel is a mystery novel by Agatha Christie, first published in the United Kingdom by the Collins Crime Club on 15 November 1965 and in the United States by Dodd, Mead and Company in 1966. The novel follows Chief Inspector Fred Davy as he investigates an upmarket hotel that is at the centre of a mysterious disappearance. Among the guests at the hotel is Christie's popular character Miss Marple; At Bertram's Hotel was marketed as a Miss Marple novel, despite the fact that Marple only appears in a few chapters and has a completely passive role in the investigation.

At Bertram's Hotel met with mostly positive reviews. Reviewers criticized the reliance on far-fetched coincidences, but found that Christie's gripping writing style makes the book enjoyable in spite of any weaknesses in the plot.

== Plot ==
Miss Marple takes a two-week holiday in London at Bertram's Hotel, an establishment known for its authentic recreation of the Edwardian era, with the addition of modern conveniences. With her friend Lady Selina Hazy, Miss Marple observes the other guests: the famous adventuress Bess Sedgwick; her daughter, Elvira Blake, whom Bess has not seen since the girl was two years old, saying it's better for Elvira to be separated from her, as she's a dangerous person, not safe to be around; Elvira's legal guardian Colonel Luscombe, who brought Elvira to the hotel not knowing that Bess was also staying there; the clergyman Canon Pennyfather; and the racing car driver Ladislaus Malinowski, who drops into the hotel to leave a message.

Bess Sedgwick recognises the hotel's commissionaire, Michael Gorman. Unknown to either of them, Miss Marple and Elvira overhear their discussion of their shared past in Ballygowlan, Ireland.

Elvira arranges a scheme with her friend Bridget to get money to fly to Ireland for unspecified reasons. She visits the lawyer Richard Egerton, one of her trustees, to find out the size of her inheritance, which is apparently large, and to find out who gets it if she dies.

Canon Pennyfather attempts to travel to Lucerne for a conference, but he leaves on the wrong day and misses the event. Upon his return to Bertram's late at night he finds intruders in his bedroom. Some hours later the Irish Mail train is robbed. Some witnesses of the robbery report having seen Pennyfather on the train.

Days later, the Canon's disappearance is reported to the police. Inspector Campbell and Chief Inspector Davy visit Bertram's to investigate the disappearance as well as the series of robberies, which Davy begins to suspect may have some connection with the hotel. After the Inspector questions everyone at the hotel, Davy meets Miss Marple. She tells him that she saw Canon Pennyfather at the hotel after he had supposedly left for Lucerne. The Canon is then discovered to be alive, having been found unconscious and nursed back to health by some Good Samaritans. However, he has no memory of events after he set out to take his plane to Lucerne.

On Miss Marple's last day at the hotel, Gorman is shot with Malinowski's gun. Elvira Blake says that he was shielding her from gunfire by an unknown assailant.

With Miss Marple's help, Davy discovers the truth about Bertram's Hotel: it is the base of a sophisticated criminal gang that commits large-scale robberies while impersonating distinguished hotel guests. Miss Marple realises that she saw a doppelganger, a younger man who closely resembled Pennyfather, at the hotel that night. This jogs Pennyfather's memory, and he remembers that he saw himself sitting on a chair in his hotel room just before he was knocked unconscious. The gang had expected Canon Pennyfather to be in Lucerne and had sent a double to replace him and take part in the train robbery, to cause confusion with witnesses.

Davy and Miss Marple confront Bess Sedgwick as the orchestrator of the daring robberies, along with the maître d'hôtel Henry, and Ladislaus Malinowski who was involved when fast cars were needed. The hotel staff co-operated with the gang, with the owners handling the money side of the thefts.

Bess and Gorman had been married at one time, and the marriage had never been annulled, making Bess's subsequent marriages void. Bess confesses to her part in the robberies, as well as to the murder of Gorman. She then steals a car and speeds recklessly away, before crashing fatally.

Miss Marple is unconvinced that Bess killed Gorman, believing that she was covering for Elvira Blake. Elvira believed that, as the illegitimate offspring of a bigamist, she would be disinherited, and she killed Gorman to keep him quiet. Davy will not let her get away with the murder.

== Principal characters ==
- Miss Marple: amateur sleuth, currently on holiday in London.
- Mr Humfries: manager of Bertram's Hotel.
- Miss Gorringe: works at the reception desk at Bertram's Hotel.
- Rose Sheldon: chambermaid employed at Bertram's Hotel, who previously worked as an actress.
- Lady Selina Hazy: guest at the hotel, a friend of Miss Marple.
- The Honourable Elvira Blake: beautiful young woman, a guest at the hotel who has just returned from finishing school in Italy.
- Mrs Carpenter: Elvira's chaperone while travelling from Italy to England.
- Bridget: Elvira's best friend from the school in Italy and unknown to Elvira's guardian.
- Colonel Derek Luscombe: Elvira's guardian, accompanying her at the hotel; one of three trustees who manage Elvira's inheritance.
- Mr Bollard: owner of a jewellery shop on Bond Street.
- Bess Sedgwick: guest at the hotel, about 40 years old, and well known for her life of daring adventures; she is Elvira's estranged mother.
- Henry: Maitre d' at Bertram's hotel
- Michael "Micky" Gorman: commissionaire at the hotel, an Irishman with a military background and Lady Sedgwick's estranged first husband.
- Richard Egerton: lawyer who is one of the three trustees for Elvira's inheritance.
- Inspector Campbell: inspector at Scotland Yard.
- Chief Inspector Fred "Father" Davy: Scotland Yard detective.
- Sergeant Wadell: policeman from Scotland Yard.
- Canon Pennyfather: scholarly clergyman.
- Ladislaus Malinowski: racing car driver in his thirties, associate and occasional lover of Lady Sedgwick; her daughter Elvira has fallen in love with him.
- Mrs McCrae: Canon Pennyfather's housekeeper.
- Archdeacon Simmons: Canon Pennyfather's friend and house guest.
- Mr Robinson: financial businessman.
- Wilhelm and Robert Hoffman: wealthy Swiss brothers who are the true owners of Bertram's Hotel.

== Real-world model for Bertram's Hotel ==
Writing in 1982, Charles Osborne suggested that the fictional Bertram's Hotel had been inspired by Brown's Hotel, where Agatha Christie often stayed when visiting London. However, Christie's authorised biographer Janet Morgan asserted that Bertram's was based on Flemings Mayfair Hotel. Morgan cited correspondence between Christie and her agent Edmund Cork in which they decided to change the hotel proprietor's name and the street in which Bertram's was located in order to obscure the Flemings connection. The Oxford Dictionary of National Biography also states that Fleming's was Christie's model.

== Reception ==
Reviews at the time of publication considered the denouement too far-fetched. In The Guardian (17 December 1965) Francis Iles (Anthony Berkeley Cox) wrote that "At Bertram's Hotel can hardly be called a major Agatha Christie [novel], for in spite of the presence of Miss Marples [sic] the denouement is really too far-fetched. But does the plot matter so much with Mrs Christie? What does matter is that one just can't put any book of hers down."

Maurice Richardson wrote in The Observer (12 December 1965) that "A C is seldom at her best when she goes thrillerish on you. This one is a bit wild and far-fetched, but it's got plenty of that phenomenal zest and makes a reasonably snug read."

Robert Weaver wrote in the Toronto Daily Star (8 January 1966): "At Bertram's Hotel is vintage Agatha Christie: an ingenious mystery that triumphantly gets away with what in lesser hands would be the most outrageous coincidences."

This novel was listed in Anthony Boucher's Best Crime Novels of the Year for 1966, one of thirteen listed that year.

Brigid Brophy complained that the author offered "nothing like enough signposts to give the reader a chance to beat Miss Marple or the police to the solution".

Robert Barnard wrote of this novel that "The plot is rather creaky, as in most of the late ones, but the hotel atmosphere is very well conveyed and used. Elvira Blake is one of the best observed of the many young people in late Christie. Note the reflections in Chapter 5 in the novel on the changed look of elderly people, showing that the sharp eye had not dimmed, even if the narrative grasp was becoming shaky."

== Publication history ==
The novel was first serialised in the British weekly magazine Woman's Own in five abridged instalments from 20 November to 18 December 1965, illustrated with specially posed photographic layouts by Abis Sida Stribley. In the United States the novel was serialised in Good Housekeeping in two instalments, in March (volume 162, number 3) and April 1966 (volume 162, number 4), with illustrations by Sanford Kossin and a photograph by James Viles.

== Adaptations ==
A BBC television adaptation shown in 1987 starred Joan Hickson as Miss Marple and Caroline Blakiston as Bess Sedgwick.

A BBC radio adaptation by Michael Bakewell, broadcast in 1995–1996, starred June Whitfield as Miss Marple and Sian Phillips as Bess Sedgwick.

ITV broadcast its adaptation on 23 September 2007 as part of the third series of Agatha Christie's Marple, starring Geraldine McEwan.
