= 4:50 from Paddington =

1957 mystery novel by Agatha Christie

- First edition (UK)
- Author: Agatha Christie
- Series: Miss Marple novels
- Genre: Crime novel
- Published: 1957 (Collins Crime Club)
- Publication place: United Kingdom
- Media type: Print (hardback and paperback)
- Pages: 256 (first edition, hardcover)
- OCLC: 2743158
- LC Class: PR6005.H66 F65
- Preceded by: A Pocket Full of Rye
- Followed by: The Mirror Crack'd from Side to Side

4:50 from Paddington is a mystery novel by Agatha Christie, first published in November 1957 in the United Kingdom by Collins Crime Club. This work was published in the United States at the same time as What Mrs. McGillicuddy Saw!, by Dodd, Mead. The novel was published in serial form before the book was released in each nation, and under different titles. The US edition retailed at $2.95.

Reviewers at the time of publication generally liked the novel, but would have liked more direct involvement of Miss Marple, and less consideration of her failing strength, using others to act for her. A later review by Barnard found the story short on clues, but favourably noted Lucy Eyelesbarrow as an independent woman character.

The 1961 film Murder, She Said was based on this novel, as were several television programmes.

== Plot ==
Elspeth McGillicuddy is on her way to visit her friend Jane Marple. As her train passes another running in the same direction, she sees a woman on the other train being strangled by a man. After the police fail to discover any sign of a body, Miss Marple concludes that it must have been thrown from the train into the adjacent grounds of Rutherford Hall. She sends Lucy Eyelesbarrow, a freelance housekeeper, to work there.

Rutherford Hall is the home of an irritable widower named Luther Crackenthorpe. It was originally his father's, who had made his fortune in biscuit manufacturing. On his death, he had left the Hall in trust for his eldest grandson, with Luther allowed to live in the house for his lifetime. The capital from the estate is also held in trust, to be divided on Luther's death equally among Luther's surviving children.

Edmund, Luther's firstborn son, died during World War II. Younger daughter Edith died four years before the novel begins, leaving a son, Alexander, currently on holiday from school. Luther's remaining children are Cedric, a painter (who will inherit the house); Harold, a married businessman; Alfred, whose business is somewhat shady; and Emma, who is unmarried. Others at the Hall include Alexander's father Bryan Eastley and Alexander's schoolfriend James Stoddart-West. Dr Quimper attends to Luther and is close friends with Emma.

Lucy finds a woman's body hidden in a barn on the property. The police, led by Inspector Craddock, identify the victim's clothing as French. Their enquiries lead them to think that the dead woman may have been a dancer calling herself "Anna Stravinska", who had gone missing from a ballet troupe. However, that name is an alias, and the police cannot trace her.

Emma tells the police about two letters: an older one from her brother Edmund, written shortly before his death in France, in which he said he intended to marry a woman named Martine, and a recent one that seems to be from this Martine, wanting to connect with the family. The family concludes that the second letter is probably a scam, since Martine has not been heard from in many years. The police suspect that the body is that of Martine.

Alexander tells Lucy that his father, Bryan, is fond of her, and says he wouldn't mind having her as stepmother. James's mother, Lady Stoddart-West, arrives to reveal that she is in fact Martine. She explains that Edmund died before they could be married, and after she married another man she resolved not to bring up the painful past by telling the Crackenthorpes about their connection. She has chosen to speak up now only because her son told her about the identification of the dead woman as Martine. After Edmund's death, Martine had joined the Resistance and briefly met Bryan Eastley, who was escaping through France. At Rutherford Hall, she recognises him again.

The entire household, apart from Lucy and the absent Bryan and Alexander, becomes ill, and Alfred dies. The curry made by Lucy is found to contain arsenic. After returning home to London, Harold receives a delivery of tablets from Dr Quimper; they are poisoned with aconitine, and he also dies.

Miss Marple and Mrs McGillicuddy arrive for afternoon tea at Rutherford Hall. Mrs McGillicuddy asks to use the lavatory and, while she is out of the room, Miss Marple pretends to choke on a fish bone from a fish-paste sandwich. Dr Quimper moves to assist her. Mrs McGillicuddy re-enters the room and, seeing the doctor backlit against the window with his hands at Miss Marple's throat, cries out, "But that's him – that's the man on the train!"

Miss Marple knew that her friend would recognise the murderer if she saw him again in a similar pose. The dead woman was Quimper's wife whom, when she would not agree to a divorce, he killed to be free to marry Emma. Quimper had killed Alfred and Harold, to increase Emma's share of the inheritance. The novel ends with Inspector Craddock wondering about the outcome of the apparent love triangle between Lucy, Cedric, and Bryan. Miss Marple ambiguously states that she knows whom Lucy will choose.

== Principal characters ==
- Miss Marple: astute amateur sleuth.
- Elspeth McGillicuddy: witness to the murder on the train, a friend of Miss Marple.
- Lucy Eyelesbarrow: Miss Marple's younger collaborator at the Hall. She is a brilliant scholar, skilled cook and energetic housekeeper with a good reputation and excellent client list.
- David West: He works at British Railways and is the second son of Miss Marple's nephew Raymond West.
- Luther Crackenthorpe: elderly widower with a life interest in Rutherford Hall, close with money.
- Cedric Crackenthorpe: Luther's son, a bohemian painter living in Ibiza. As the eldest surviving son, he will inherit Rutherford Hall and surrounding lands when his father dies.
- Harold Crackenthorpe: Luther's son, married businessman in London, with no children.
- Lady Alice Crackenthorpe: Harold's wife, daughter of an impoverished earl.
- Alfred Crackenthorpe: Luther's son, with no regular employment, on the edge of illegal activities.
- Emma Crackenthorpe: Luther's daughter, who lives at home and takes care of him.
- Bryan Eastley: widower of Edith Crackenthorpe, Luther's deceased younger daughter.
- Alexander Eastley: son of Edith and Bryan, who comes to Rutherford Hall on a school holiday.
- James Stoddart-West: school friend of Alexander.
- Lady Stoddart-West: mother of James.
- Dr Quimper: Luther's general practitioner.
- Detective-Inspector Dermot Craddock: godson of Sir Henry Clithering.
- Armand Dessin: Inspector at the Paris Prefecture who assists Craddock in the investigation.
- Anna Stravinska: Dancer in the Ballet Maritski in Paris. Stage name of Quimper's wife.
- Madame Joliet: Director of the Ballet Maritski in Paris.

== Title ==
The UK title 4:50 from Paddington specifies a train time departing in the afternoon from Paddington station, a major station in central London. In the British style used when the novel was first published, the time was written as 4.50 (in later timetables, after 1964, it would be 16:50). The London railway stations were perhaps not considered well known by the US publisher, and thus the title in the US was changed to What Mrs McGillicuddy Saw!

== Literary significance and reception ==
Philip John Stead's review in The Times Literary Supplement (29 November 1957) concluded that "Miss Christie never harrows her readers, being content to intrigue and amuse them."

The novel was reviewed in The Times edition of 5 December 1957, stating, "Mrs Christie's latest is a model detective story; one keeps turning back to verify clues, and not one is irrelevant or unfair." The review concluded, "Perhaps there is a corpse or two too many, but there is never a dull moment."

Fellow crime writer Anthony Berkeley Cox, writing under the pen name of Francis Iles, reviewed the novel in the 6 December 1957 issue of The Guardian, in which he confessed to being disappointed with the work: "I have only pity for those poor souls who cannot enjoy the sprightly stories of Agatha Christie; but though sprightliness is not the least of this remarkable writer's qualities, there is another that we look for in her, and that is detection: genuine, steady, logical detection, taking us step by step nearer to the heart of the mystery. Unfortunately it is that quality that is missing in 4:50 from Paddington. The police never seem to find out a single thing, and even Miss Marples (sic) lies low and says nuffin' to the point until the final dramatic exposure. There is the usual small gallery of interesting and perfectly credible characters and nothing could be easier to read. But please, Mrs Christie, a little more of that incomparable detection next time."

Robert Barnard said of this novel that it was "Another locomotive one – murder seen as two trains pass each other in the same direction. Later settles down into a good old family murder. Contains one of Christie's few sympathetic independent women. Miss Marple apparently solves the crime by divine guidance, for there is very little in the way of clues or logical deduction."

== Publication history ==
In the UK the novel was first serialised in the weekly magazine John Bull in five abridged instalments from 5 October (volume 102 number 2675) to 2 November 1957 (volume 102 number 2679) with illustrations by K. J. Petts.

The novel was first serialised in the US in the Chicago Tribune in thirty-six instalments from Sunday 27 October to Saturday 7 December 1957 under title Eyewitness to Death.

The novel was published in the US under the title What Mrs. McGillicuddy Saw! by Dodd, Mead and Co. The UK version was to be titled 4:54 from Paddington until the last minute, when the title and text references were changed to 4:50 from Paddington. This change was not communicated to Dodd Mead until after the book was being printed, so the text references to the time show 4:54 rather than 4:50.

An abridged version of the novel was also published in the 28 December 1957 issue of the Star Weekly Complete Novel, a Toronto newspaper supplement, under the title Eye Witness to Death with a cover illustration by Maxine McCaffrey.

== Adaptations ==
=== Film ===
The book was adapted into a 1961 film starring Margaret Rutherford in the first of her four appearances as Miss Marple.

=== Television ===
The 1987 BBC television series starred Joan Hickson (who also appeared as Mrs Kidder in the 1961 film adaptation, Murder, She Said).

- Cast:
  - Joan Hickson – Miss Marple
  - Jill Meager – Lucy Eyelesbarrow
  - David Beames – Bryan Eastley
  - Joanna David – Emma Crackenthorpe
  - Maurice Denham – Luther Crackenthorpe
  - John Hallam – Cedric Crackenthorpe
  - Robert East – Alfred Crackenthorpe
  - Bernard Brown – Harold Crackenthorpe
  - Andrew Burt – Dr Quimper
  - David Waller – Detective Chief Inspector Duckham
  - David Horovitch – Detective Inspector Slack
  - Mona Bruce – Mrs McGillicuddy

ITV adapted the novel for the series Marple in 2004 starring Geraldine McEwan as Miss Marple. The title What Mrs McGillicuddy Saw! was used when it was shown in the US.

- Cast:
  - Geraldine McEwan – Miss Jane Marple
  - Amanda Holden – Lucy Eyelesbarrow
  - John Hannah – Inspector Tom Campbell
  - Michael Landes – Bryan Eastley
  - Niamh Cusack – Emma Crackenthorpe
  - David Warner – Luther Crackenthorpe
  - Ciarán McMenamin – Cedric Crackenthorpe
  - Ben Daniels – Alfred Crackenthorpe
  - Charlie Creed-Miles – Harold Crackenthorpe
  - Rose Keegan – Lady Alice Crackenthorpe
  - Griff Rhys Jones – Dr Quimper
  - Rob Brydon – Inspector Awdry
  - Pam Ferris – Mrs Elspeth McGillicuddy
  - Celia Imrie – Madame Joliet
  - Jenny Agutter – Agnes Crackenthorpe

The novel was adapted as a set of 4 episodes of the Japanese animated television series Agatha Christie's Great Detectives Poirot and Marple, airing in 2005.

Le crime est notre affaire (released in the UK as Crime Is Our Business) is a French film directed by Pascal Thomas, released in 2008. It is named after the French title of Christie's short story collection Partners in Crime, which features Tommy and Tuppence as the detective characters. Although the film similarly features Tommy and Tuppence rather than Miss Marple, the plot matches that of 4:50 from Paddington. The film is a sequel to Thomas's 2004 film Mon petit doigt m'a dit... (By the Pricking of My Thumbs).

- Cast
  - Catherine Frot – Prudence Beresford, based on Tuppence Beresford
  - André Dussollier – Bélisaire Beresford, based on Tommy Beresford
  - Claude Rich – Roderick Charpentier, based on Luther Crackenthorpe
  - Annie Cordy – Babette Boutiti, based on Mrs McGillicuddy
  - Chiara Mastroianni – Emma Charpentier, based on Emma Crackenthorpe
  - Melvil Poupaud – Frédéric Charpentier, based on Alfred Crackenthorpe
  - Alexandre Lafaurie – Raphaël Charpentier, based on Harold Crackenthorpe
  - Christian Vadim – Augustin Charpentier, based on Cedric Crackenthorpe
  - Hippolyte Girardot – Doctor Lagarde, based on Dr Quimper
  - Yves Afonso – Inspector Blache

TV Asahi adapted the novel in 2018 starring Yuki Amami and Atsuko Maeda, with the title Two Nights Drama Special: 4:50 from Paddington – Night Express Train Murder (Japanese: アガサ・クリスティ 二夜連続ドラマスペシャル パディントン発4時50分〜寝台特急殺人事件〜) as the first night.

- Cast:
  - Yuki Amami – Toko Amano, based on Miss Jane Marple
  - Atsuko Maeda – Aya Nakamura, based on Lucy Eyelesbarrow
  - Sachie Hara – Keiko Tomizawa, based on Emma Crackenthorpe
  - Toshihiro Yashiba – Shin Furukawa, based on Bryan Eastley
  - Toshiyuki Nishida – Shinsuke Tomizawa, based on Luther Crackenthorpe
  - Kosuke Suzuki – Tetsuji Tomizawa, based on Cedric Crackenthorpe
  - Shinya Niiro – Seizo Tomizawa, based on Harold Crackenthorpe
  - Hiroyuki Matsumoto – Shiro Tomizawa, based on Alfred Crackenthorpe
  - Ken Ishiguro – Keiichi Saeki, based on Dr Quimper
  - Akio Mochizuki – Eiichi Tomizawa, based on Edmund Crackenthorpe
  - Mitsuko Kusabue – Suzume Amano, based on Mrs Elspeth McGillicuddy
  - Tomoka Kurotani – Reiko Kimura, based on Lady Stoddart-West
  - Ayumi Ena – Mamei Zhou, based on Anna Stravinska

=== Video game ===
On 17 June 2010, I-play released a downloadable hidden object game based on 4:50 from Paddington.
