= Murder with Mirrors =

1985 British-American television film

- Genre: Crime, Mystery, Romance
- Based on: They Do It with Mirrors by Agatha Christie
- Written by: George Eckstein
- Directed by: Dick Lowry
- Starring: Helen Hayes; Bette Davis; John Mills; Leo McKern
- Music by: Richard Rodney Bennett
- Countries of origin: United Kingdom; United States
- Original language: English

Production
- Executive producer: George Eckstein
- Producer: Neil Hartley
- Production locations: Brocket Hall, Lemsford, England
- Cinematography: Brian West
- Editor: Richard Bracken
- Running time: 100 minutes
- Production company: Warner Bros. Television

Original release
- Network: CBS
- Release: February 20, 1985

Murder with Mirrors is a 1985 British-American television film starring Helen Hayes (in her final film role) and Bette Davis. It is based on Agatha Christie's novel They Do It with Mirrors, using the novel's American title. The novel has been dramatized on two separated series, Miss Marple and Agatha Christie's Marple. They used the novel's original title.

== Synopsis ==
Miss Marple reunites with her friend Carrie Louise Serrocold at her country mansion. Christian Gulbranson, Marple's lawyer, persuades her to visit the estate of his stepmother, Carrie Louise. Her devoted husband Lewis has turned the manor house Stonygates into a halfway house for criminals. He confides to Marple and suspects someone poisoning Carrie with arsenic. After Christian dies, a killer is at large in a house full of suspects.

== Cast ==
- Helen Hayes as Miss Jane Marple
- Bette Davis as Carrie Louise Serrocold
- John Mills as Lewis Serrocold
- Leo McKern as Inspector Curry
- Liane Langland as Gina Markham
- John Laughlin as Wally Markham
- Dorothy Tutin as Mildred Strete
- Anton Rodgers as Dr. Max Hargrove
- Frances de la Tour as Miss Bellaver
- John Woodvine as Christian Gulbranson
- James Coombes as Steven Restarick
- Tim Roth as Edgar Lawson

== Production ==
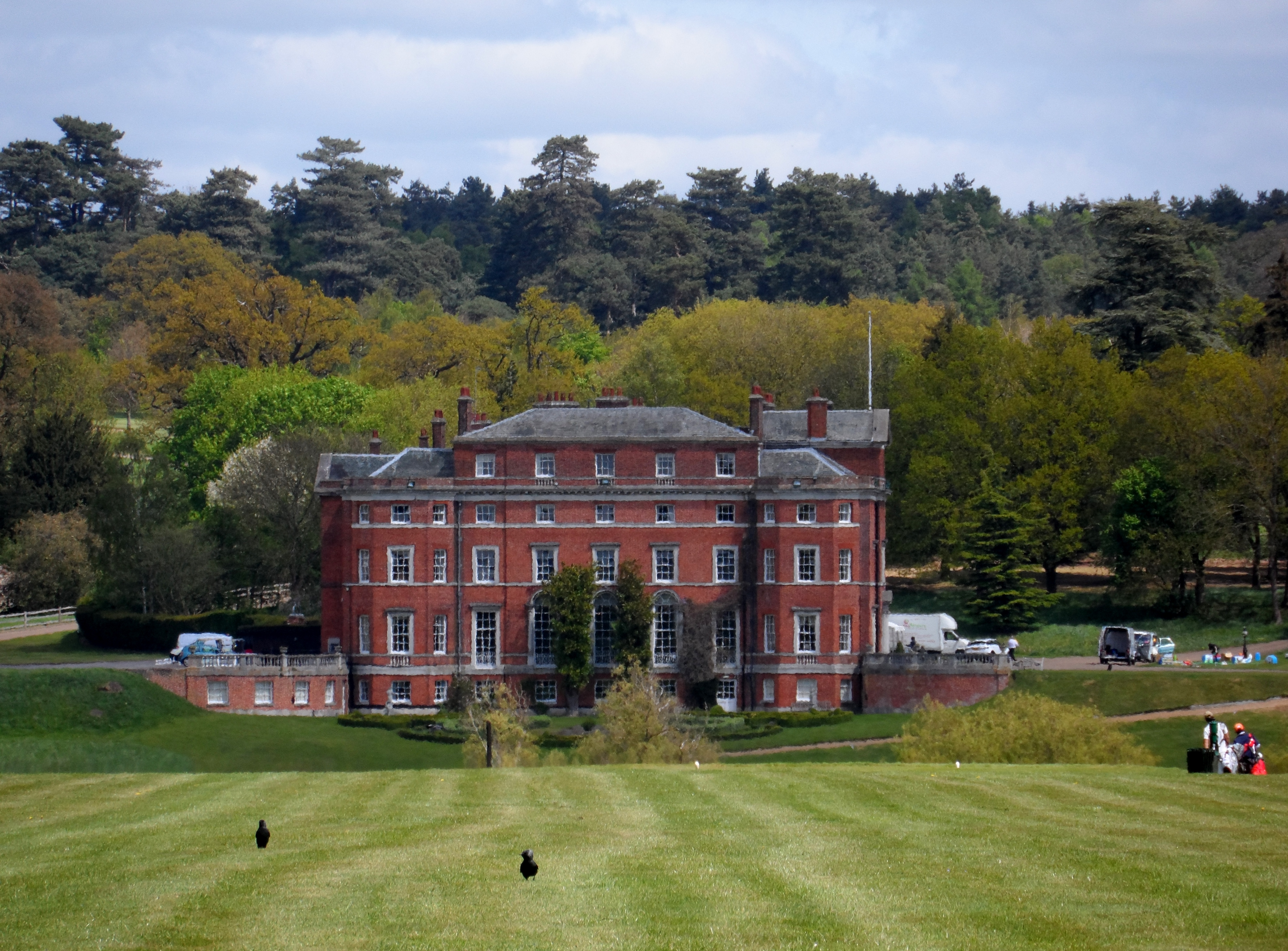
Brocket Hall

The film is directed by Dick Lowry, with music composed by Richard Rodney Bennett.

It was filmed entirely on location in England, with Brocket Hall in Hertfordshire featured as the fictional Stonygates. Several locations in London include Carlton House Terrace, Trafalgar Square, Westminster Bridge, Turville, Seer Green, Skirmett, and Buckinghamshire.
