= Gabrielle Hamilton (actress) =

British actress (1923–2014)

- Born: 1923; Edmonton, England
- Died: 2014 (aged 91); England
- Occupation: Actor
- Years active: 1952–2014
- Spouses: John Hollis (m. 1953–1965) Michael Andrews (m. 1968)

Gabrielle Hamilton (1923–2014) was a British actress who performed in television films and series from 1953 to 2014.

Hamilton also worked extensively in theatre, including the Royal Shakespeare Company and at Oxford. Her facial and vocal similarities to Joan Hickson additionally saw her play Agatha Christie's Miss Marple on stage.

Hamilton died in 2014, aged 91.
