= Ryūichi Tamura =

Japanese writer (1923–1998)

- 田村 隆一
- Born: 18 March 1923; Tokyo, Japan
- Died: 26 August 1998 (aged 75); Kamakura, Kanagawa, Japan
- Occupations: Poet, essayist
- Spouse: Eriko Kishida (married 1963-1969)
- Writing career
- Genre: Poetry

Ryūichi Tamura (田村 隆一, Tamura Ryūichi; 18 March 1923 – 26 August 1998) was a Japanese poet, essayist and translator of English language novels and poetry who was active during the Shōwa period.

== Biography ==
Tamura was born in what is now Sugamo, Tokyo. After graduation from the Third Metropolitan Commercial High School, he was hired by Tokyo Gas, but quit work after only one day. He then continued his studies, and was a graduate of the Literature Department of Meiji University, where he met a group of young poets interested in modernism. He was drafted into the Imperial Japanese Navy in 1943, and although he did not see combat, the fact that many of his friends died in the war left him psychologically scarred.

In 1947, after World War II, he revived the literary magazine Arechi ("The Waste Land"), with his surviving school friends, and became an important figure in post-war modern Japanese poetry. He also began translation work of English language novels, starting with the works of Agatha Christie.

In 1963, he married fellow poet, translator, and children's author Eriko Kishida before they divorced in July 1969.

His first poetry anthology, Yosen no hi no yoru ("Four Thousand Days and Nights", 1956), introduced a hard tone to modern Japanese poetry, using paradoxes, metaphors, and sharp imagery to describe the sense of dislocation and crisis experienced by people who had suffered through the rapid modernization of Japan and the destruction of World War II. With the publication of Kotoba no nai sekai ("World Without Words", 1962), he was established as a major poet. He spent five months at the University of Iowa's International Writing Program in 1967–68 as Guest Poet. Later, he traveled to England, Scotland and India. These travel experiences filled another twenty eight volumes of poetry. He was awarded the prestigious Yomiuri Prize In 1984.

Tamura was awarded the 54th Japan Academy of Arts Award for Poetry in 1998. He died of esophageal cancer later that same year. His grave is at the temple of Myōhon-ji in Kamakura.

== Bibliography ==
- World Without Words. Trans. Takako Uchino Lento. The Ceres Press (1971).
- Dead Languages: Selected Poems 1946-1984. Trans. Christopher Drake. Katdid Books (1984).
- Poetry of Ryuichi Tamura. Trans. Samuel Grolmes & Yukiko Tsumura. CCC Books (1998).
- Tamura Ryuichi Poems, 1946 - 1998, Trans. Samuel Grolmes & Yukiko Tsumura. CCC Books (2000).
- Tamura Ryuichi: On the Life and Work of a 20th Century Master. Ed. Takako Lento & Wayne Miller. Pleiades Press, (2011).

=== Publications in Japan ===
- Four Thousand Days and Nights (1956)
- The World Without Words (1962)
- Poetry of Ryuichi Tamura (1966)
- A Green Thought (1967)
- New Year’s Letter (1973)
- Dead Language (1976)
- Misunderstanding (1978)
- Water Hemisphere (1980)
- A Little Bird Laughed (1981)
- The Water Mills of Scotland (1982)
- Five Minutes to Go (1982)
- A Cheerful End of the Century (1983)
- The Joy of A Slave (1984)
- A Wine Red Summer Solstice (1985)
- A Poison Cup (1986)
- The Joy of Living (1988)
- From the New World (1990)
- My Sailing Journal (1991)
- Hummingbird (1992)
- The Ashen Colored Notebook (1993)
- Foxglove (1995)
- 1999 (1998)
- The Traveler Returned (1998)

=== Selected translation works ===
- Agatha Christie
  - Hercule Poirot
    - The Mysterious Affair at Styles, The Murder on the Links, The Murder of Roger Ackroyd, The Big Four, The Mystery of the Blue Train, Peril at End House, Three Act Tragedy, The A.B.C. Murders, Mrs McGinty's Dead, Dead Man's Folly
  - Miss Marple
    - The Murder at the Vicarage, A Murder Is Announced, They Do It with Mirrors
  - The Secret Adversary, The Listerdale Mystery, The Sittaford Mystery, Why Didn't They Ask Evans?, Towards Zero, Crooked House
- Lloyd Alexander - The Towncats and Other Tales
- Eric Ambler - Epitaph for a Spy
- L. Frank Baum - A Kidnapped Santa Claus
- Anthony Browne - Bear Hunt
- Donald Crews - Freight Train
- Freeman Wills Crofts - The Cask
- Roald Dahl - Someone Like You, James and the Giant Peach, Charlie and the Chocolate Factory, Fantastic Mr Fox, Charlie and the Great Glass Elevator, The Enormous Crocodile, The Twits, My Uncle Oswald
- Evan Hunter - Criminal Conversation
- Roger Hargreaves - Mr. Happy, Mr. Nosey, Mr. Daydream, Mr. Silly, Mr. Small, Mr. Greedy, Mr. Bump, Mr. Topsy-Turvy, Mr. Uppity, Mr. Tickle, Mr. Messy, Mr. Sneeze (Some stories from Mr. Men Series)
- Theo. LeSieg - Ten Apples Up on Top!
- Bill Peet - Kermit the Hermit, Buford the Little Bighorn
- Ellery Queen - The Tragedy of X, The Tragedy of Y, The Tragedy Of Z, Drury Lane's Last Case (Drury Lane Series)
- Anne Rice - Interview with the Vampire
- Tomi Ungerer - The Sorcerer's Apprentice, Zeralda's Ogre, The Beast of Monsieur Racine, Moon Man, The Hut
