= List of Agatha Christie's Poirot episodes =

The following is a list of episodes for the British crime drama Agatha Christie's Poirot, starring David Suchet as Poirot, which aired on ITV from 8 January 1989 to 13 November 2013. Overall, 70 episodes were made over 13 series.

Episodes run for either approximately 50 minutes or 90–100 minutes, the latter of which is the format of all episodes from series 6 onwards. The shorter episodes are based on Christie's short stories featuring Poirot, many published in the 1920s, and are considerably embellished from their original form. The longer episodes are based on Christie's 33 Poirot novels and one short story collection (The Labours of Hercules).

== Series overview ==
The “Titles” below link to Wikipedia articles describing the original print publications on which the programmes were based, not to articles about the episodes.

Series	Episodes	Originally released		Avg. UK viewers (millions)
Series	Episodes	First released	Last released	Avg. UK viewers (millions)
1	10	8 January 1989	19 March 1989	TBA
2	9	7 January 1990	4 March 1990	TBA
3	11	16 September 1990	10 March 1991	TBA
4	3	5 January 1992	19 January 1992	TBA
5	8	17 January 1993	7 March 1993	TBA
6	4	1 January 1995	16 March 1996	TBA
7	2	2 January 2000	19 February 2000	9.12
8	2	20 April 2001	8 July 2001	7.21
9	4	14 December 2003	26 April 2004	7.27
10	4	11 December 2005	2 April 2006	6.98
11	4	1 September 2008	22 September 2008	5.18
12	4	30 December 2009	11 July 2010	5.12
13	5	9 June 2013	13 November 2013	5.53

== Episodes ==
=== Series 1 (1989) ===
All episodes from series 1–5 are 50 minutes long, except where marked as "feature-length".

Title	UK airdate	Recurring cast	Guest cast
The Adventure of the Clapham Cook	8 January 1989	Captain Hastings, Inspector Japp, Miss Lemon	Brigit Forsyth (as Ernestine Todd); Dermot Crowley (as Arthur Simpson); Freda Dowie (as Eliza Dunn); Frank Vincent (as Purser); Katy Murphy (as Annie); Danny Webb (as Porter); Richard Bebb (as Mr Cameron); Brian Poyser (as Speaker); Antony Carrick (as Mr Todd); Phillip Manikum (as Sergeant); Jona Jones (as Constable); Nicholas Coppin (as Constable)
Murder in the Mews	15 January 1989	Captain Hastings, Inspector Japp, Miss Lemon	Juliette Mole (as Jane Plenderleith); James Faulkner (as Major Eustace); David Yelland (as Charles Laverton West); Gabrielle Blunt (as Mrs Pierce); John Cording (as Div. Inspector Jameson); Barrie Cookson (as Dr Brett); Christopher Brown (as Golfer); Bob Bryan (as Barman); Beccy Wright (as Maid); Nicholas Delve (as Freddie); Moya Ruskin (as Singer)
The Adventure of Johnnie Waverly	22 January 1989	Captain Hastings, Inspector Japp, Miss Lemon	Julia Chambers (as Ada Waverly); Patrick Jordan (as Tredwell); Patrick Connor (as Hughes); Samantha Beckinsale (as Barmaid); Dominic Rougier (as Johnnie Waverly); Geoffrey Bateman (as Marcus Waverly); Carol Frazer (as Jessie Withers); Sandra Freeman (as Miss Collins); Robert Putt (as Rogers); Phillip Manikum (as Sergeant); Jona Jones (as Constable); Jonathan Magnanti (as Policeman)
Four and Twenty Blackbirds	29 January 1989	Captain Hastings, Inspector Japp, Miss Lemon	Richard Howard (as George Lorrimer); Clifford Rose (as Peter Makinson); Tony Aitken (as Tommy Pinner); Philip Locke (as Cutter); Hilary Mason (as Mrs Hill); Cheryl Hall (as Molly); John Sessions (as Radio Voices); Andrew Mackintosh (as Doctor); Su Elliot (as Edith); John Bardon (as Lavatory Assistant); Holly De Jong (as Dulcie Lang); Geoffrey Larder (as Harry Clarke); Denys Hawthorne (as Henry Bonnington); Marjie Lawrence (as Irene Mullen); Charles Pemberton (as Stooge); Peter Waddington (as Forensic); Guy Standeven (as Vicar); Stephen Pruslin (as Pianist)
The Third Floor Flat	5 February 1989	Captain Hastings, Inspector Japp, Miss Lemon	Suzanne Burden (as Patricia Matthews); Josie Lawrence (as Ernestine Grant); John Golightly (as Removal Man); Gillian Bailey (as Mrs Sadler); Norman Lumsden (as Vicar); Robert Hines (as Jimmy Faulkener); Amanda Elwes (as Mildred Hope); Nicholas Pritchard (as Donovan Bailey); James Aiden (as Major Sadler); Peter Aubrey (as Removal Man); Jona Jones (as Police Constable); George Little (as Dicker); Helena McCarthy (as Coffee Stall Owner); Alan Partington (as Inspector Flint); Susan Porrett (as Trotter)
Triangle at Rhodes	12 February 1989		Annie Lambert (as Valentine Chantry); Angela Down (as Marjorie Gold); Jon Cartwright (as Commander Chantry); Peter Settelen (as Douglas Gold); Frances Low (as Pamela Lyall); Timothy Kightley (as Major Barnes); Dimitri Andreas (as Greek Cashier); Anthony Benson (as Skelton); Al Fiorentini (as Police Inspector); Stephen Gressieux (as Italian Policeman); Yannis Hatziyannis (as Purser); Tilemahos Emanuel (as Customs Officer); Georgia Dervis (as Greek Girl); George Little (as Dicker); Patrick Monckton (as Hotel Manager); Sofia Olympiou (as Good Woman); Martyn Whitby (as Postman)
Problem at Sea	19 February 1989	Captain Hastings	John Normington (as Colonel Clapperton); Sheila Allen (as Adeline Clapperton); Ben Aris (as Captain Fowler); Geoffrey Beevers (as Mr Tolliver); Caroline John (as Mrs Tolliver); Roger Hume (as General Forbes); Ann Firbank (as Ellie Henderson); Victoria Hasted (as Pamela Cregan); Melissa Greenwood (as Kitty Mooney); Dorothea Phillips (as Nelly Morgan); Sheri Shepstone (as Emily Morgan); Louisa Janes (as Ismene); Jack Chissick (as Bates); Colin Higgins (as Skinner); Yorgos Kotanidis (as Photographer); Panayotis Kaldis (as 1st Hawker); Stathis Mauropoulos (as 2nd Hawker); James Ottaway (as Mr Russell)
The Incredible Theft	26 February 1989	Captain Hastings, Inspector Japp, Miss Lemon	John Carson (as Sir George Carrington); Phyllida Law (as Lady Carrington); Carmen du Sautoy (as Mrs Vanderlyn); Ciaran Madden (as Lady Margaret Mayfield); John Stride (as Tommy Mayfield); Albert Welling (as Carlile); Dan Hildebrand (as Chauffeur); Guy Scantlebury (as Reggie Carrington); Phillip Manikum (as Sergeant)
The King of Clubs	12 March 1989	Captain Hastings, Inspector Japp	Jonathan Coy (as Bunny Saunders); Niamh Cusack (as Valerie Saintclair); Gawn Grainger (as Ralph Walton); Avril Elgar (as Mrs Oglander); Sean Pertwee (as Ronnie Oglander); David Swift (as Henry Reedburn); Abigail Cruttenden (as Geraldine Oglander); Jack Klaff (as Prince Paul of Maurania); Cathy Murphy (as Maid); Marc Culwick (as Young Man); Vass Anderson (as Frampton); Jeffrey Harmer (as Assistant Director); Stuart St Paul (as Stuntman); Rosie Timpson (as Miss Deloy)
The Dream	19 March 1989	Captain Hastings, Inspector Japp, Miss Lemon	Joely Richardson (as Joanna Farley); Mary Tamm (as Louise Farley); Alan Howard (as Benedict Farley); Alan Howard (as Hugo Cornworthy); Richard Bebb (as Newsreel Voice); Donald Bisset (as Mayor); Christopher Gunning (as Bandmaster); Arthur Howell (as Fencing Instructor); Paul Lacoux (as Dr John Stillingfleet); George Little (as Mr Dicker); Neville Phillips (as Holmes); Christopher Saul (as Mr Tremlett); Fred Bryant (as Workman); Martin Wenner (as Herbert Chudley); Tommy Wright (as Workman)

=== Series 2 (1990) ===
Title	UK airdate	Recurring cast	Guest cast
Peril at End House (feature-length) (Note: Peril at End House was first broadcast as a two-part episode, both parts of which aired back-to-back. Subsequent showings and DVD releases present it as a single feature-length episode (with the exception of the Blu-Ray release which kept the original airing form).)	7 January 1990	Captain Hastings, Inspector Japp, Miss Lemon	Polly Walker (as Magdala "Nick" Buckley); Carol MacReady (as Mildred Croft); Jeremy Young (as Bert Croft); Jenny Funnell (as Nurse Andrews); Godfrey James (as Inspector); John Harding (as Commander George Challenger); Alison Sterling (as Freddie Rice); Paul Geoffrey (as Jim Lazarus); Christopher Baines (as Charles Vyse); Mary Cunningham (as Ellen Wilson); Geoffrey Greenhill (as Wilson); Joe Bates (as Alfred Wilson); Elizabeth Downes (as Magdala "Maggie" Buckley); John Crocker (as Dr Graham); Jane Paton (as Hotel Receptionist); Fergus McLarnon (as Hood); Janice Cramer (as Maid); Edward Pinner (as Pageboy)
The Veiled Lady	14 January 1990	Captain Hastings, Inspector Japp, Miss Lemon	Frances Barber (as 'Lady Millicent Castle-Vaughan' / Gertie); Carole Hayman (as Mrs Godber, Lavington's housekeeper); Lloyd McGuire and Peter Geddis (as Museum Guards); Terence Harvey (as 'Mr Lavington' / Joey Weatherley); Tony Stephens (as Sergeant); Don Williams (as Constable); British Concert Winds (as Brass Band)
The Lost Mine	21 January 1990	Captain Hastings, Inspector Japp, Miss Lemon	Anthony Bate (as Lord Pearson); James Saxon (as Reggie Dyer); Colin Stinton (as Charles Lester); Richard Albrecht (as Lobby Clerk); Julian Firth (as Bank Teller); Ozzie Yue (as Restaurant Manager); Chris Walker (as First Officer); Hi Ching (as Chow Feng); Gloria Connell (as Miss Devenish); John Cording (as Sergeant Jameson); Vincent Wong (as Chinaman); Joe Frazer (as Second Officer); Daryl Kwan (as Oriental Gentleman); Susan Leong (as Chinese Tart); Peter Barnes (as Wilkins)
The Cornish Mystery	28 January 1990	Captain Hastings, Inspector Japp, Miss Lemon	Chloe Salaman (as Freda Stanton); John Bowler (as Jacob Radnor); Jerome Willis (as Edward Pengelley); Amanda Walker (as Alice Pengelley); Tilly Vosburgh (as Jessie Dawlish); Derek Benfield (as Dr Adams); John Rowe (as Prosecutor); Richard Braine (as Mr Newsom); Laura Girling (as Edwina Marks); Hugh Munro (as Judge); Edwina Day (as Landlady); Graham Callan (as Solicitor); Hugh Sullivan (as Vicar); Jonathan Whaley (as Policeman)
The Disappearance of Mr. Davenheim	4 February 1990	Captain Hastings, Inspector Japp, Miss Lemon	Mel Martin (as Charlotte Davenheim); Kenneth Colley (as Matthew Davenheim); Richard Beale (as Merritt); Bob Mason (as Sergeant); Patrick Page (as Illusionist); Tony Mathews (as Gerald Lowen); Fiona McArthur (as Maid); Peter Doran (as Policeman); Jonty Miller (as Mechanic); Malcolm Mudie (as Chief Engineer); Stewart Harwood (as Man Delivering Parrot)
Double Sin	11 February 1990	Captain Hastings, Inspector Japp, Miss Lemon	Elspet Gray (as Elizabeth Penn); Caroline Milmoe (as Mary Durrant); Jeffrey Perry (as Hotel Receptionist); Harry Goodier (as Billy Arkwright); Michael J. Shannon (as J. Baker Wood); Adam Kotz (as Norton Kane); Amanda Garwood (as Lady Amanda Manderley); David Hargreaves (as Sergeant Vinney); Gerald Horan (as PC Flagg); Miranda Forbes (as Landlady); George Little (as Dicker); Paul Gabriel (as Speedy Tours Representative); Anne Small (as Pianist); Jack Williams (as Second Urchin); Ned Williams (as First Urchin)
The Adventure of the Cheap Flat	18 February 1990	Captain Hastings, Inspector Japp, Miss Lemon	Samantha Bond (as Stella Robinson); John Michie (as James Robinson); William Hootkins (as FBI Agent Burt); Nigel Whitmey (as Luigi Valdarno); Peter Howell (as Mr Paul); Gordon Wharmby (as Records Agent); Jenifer Landor (as Carla Romero); Ian Price (as Teddy Parker); Nick Maloney (as Bernie Cole); Jemma Churchill (as Elsie); Anthony Pedley (as Mafia Assassin); Luke Hayden (as Romero's Husband)
The Kidnapped Prime Minister	25 February 1990	Captain Hastings, Inspector Japp, Miss Lemon	Patrick Godfrey (as Lord Estair); Ronald Hines (as Sir Bernard Dodge); David Horovitch (as Commander Daniels); Lisa Harrow (as Imogen Daniels); Roy Heather (as Transport Superintendent); Milo Sperber (as Mr Fingler); Anthony Chinn (as Shi Mong); Jack Elliott (as John Egan); Sam Clifton (as Street Urchin); Daniel John (as Street Urchin); Oliver Beamish (as Sergeant Hopper); Kate Binchy (as Egan's Landlady); Timothy Block (as Major Norman); Henry Moxon (as Prime Minister McAdam)
The Adventure of the Western Star	4 March 1990	Captain Hastings, Inspector Japp, Miss Lemon	Caroline Goodall (as Lady Yardly); Rosalind Bennett (as Marie Marvelle); Oliver Cotton (as Gregorie Rolf); Struan Rodger (as Henrik Van Braks); Stephen Hancock (as Mullings); Bruce Montague (as Mr Hoffberg); Ian Collier (as Sergeant); Bill Thomas (as Steward); Alister Cameron (as Lord Yardly); Barry Woolgar (as Inspector Dougall); Julian Gartside (as Hotel Receptionist)

=== Series 3 (1990–91) ===
Title	UK airdate	Recurring cast	Guest cast
The Mysterious Affair at Styles (feature-length)	16 September 1990	Lt Hastings, Inspector Japp	Gillian Barge (as Mrs Emily Inglethorp); Michael Cronin (as Alfred Inglethorp); Beatie Edney (as Mary Cavendish); David Rintoul (as John Cavendish); Anthony Calf (as Lawrence Cavendish); Joanna McCallum (as Evelyn Howard); Allie Byrne (as Cynthia Murdoch); Morris Perry (as Wells); Tim Preece (as Phillips); Bryan Coleman (as Vicar); Michael D. Roberts (as Tindermans); Michael Godley (as Dr Wilkins); Penelope Beaumont (as Mrs Raikes); Lala Lloyd (as Dorcas); Donald Pelmear (as Judge); Tim Munro (as Edwin Mace); David Savile (as Summerhaye); Eric Stovell (as Chemist); Caroline Swift (as Nurse); Merelina Kendall (as Mrs Dainty); Ken Robertson (as Army Officer); Robert Vowles (as Hire Car Driver); Gordon Dulieu (as Clerk of the Court); Jeffrey Robert (as Foreman of the Jury); David Michaels (as Soldier)
How Does Your Garden Grow?	6 January 1991	Captain Hastings, Inspector Japp, Miss Lemon	Catherine Russell (as Katrina Reiger); Margery Mason (as Amelia Barrowby); Anne Stallybrass (as Mary Delafontaine); Tim Wylton (as Henry Delafontaine); Peter Birch (as Nicholai); John Rogan (as Pathologist); John Burgess (as Mr Harrison); Trevor Darby (as Mr Trumper); Dorcas Morgan (as Lucy); Ralph Nossek (as Dr Sims); Stephen Petcher (as Photographer); Philip Praeger (as Police Constable)
The Million Dollar Bond Robbery	13 January 1991	Captain Hastings, Miss Lemon	Ewan Hooper (as Mr Vavasour); David Quilter (as Mr Shaw); Oliver Parker (as Philip Ridgeway); Natalie Ogle (as Esmee Dalgleish); Paul Young (as Mr McNeil); Dallas Adams (as Hood); Richard Bebb (as Newsreader); Robin Hunter (as Police Officer); Lizzy McInnerny (as Nurse Long); Lizzy McInnerny (as Miranda Brooks); Edward Phillips (as Flower Seller); Kieron Jecchinis (as Tom Franklin); Jonathan Stratt (as Spivvy Passenger); Christopher Owen (as Chief Purser)
The Plymouth Express	20 January 1991	Captain Hastings, Inspector Japp, Miss Lemon	Julian Wadham (as Rupert Carrington); Shelagh McLeod (as Florence Carrington); Marion Bailey (as 'Jane Mason', Grace Kidd); John Stone (as Gordon Halliday); Kenneth Haigh (as Mr McKenzie); Steven Mackintosh (as Newsboy); John Abbott (as Detective); Alfredo Michelson (as Count Armand de la Rochefort); Leon Eagles (as Bank Manager); Duncan Faber (as Porter); Robert Locke (as Naval Officer); Nigel Makin (as Reception Clerk); Stephen Riddle (as Barman); Richard Vanstone (as Sergeant); Adrian McLoughlin (as Station Official)
Wasps' Nest	27 January 1991	Captain Hastings, Inspector Japp, Miss Lemon	Martin Turner (as John Harrison); Peter Capaldi (as Claude Langton); John Boswall (as Dr Belvedere); Hilary Tindall (as Commere at Fashion Show); Serena Scott Thomas (as Model Girl); Melanie Jessop (as Molly Deane); Kate Lynn Evans (as Mrs Henderson); Julian Forsyth (as Waiter)
The Tragedy at Marsdon Manor	3 February 1991	Captain Hastings, Inspector Japp	Desmond Barrit (as Samuel Naughton); Ian McCulloch (as Jonathan Maltravers); Neil Duncan (as Captain Black); Edward Jewesbury (as Dr Bernard); Ralph Watson (as Danvers); Richard Bebb (as Newsreader); Pat Keen (as Civil Defence Organiser); David Lloyd (as Museum Attendant); Anita Carey (as Miss Rawlinson); Geraldine Alexander (as Susan Maltravers); Hilary Sesta (as Doctor's Receptionist); Geoffrey Swann (as Police Sergeant)
The Double Clue	10 February 1991	Captain Hastings, Inspector Japp, Miss Lemon, Vera Rossakoff	Kika Markham (as Countess Vera Rossakoff); Charmian May (as Lady Beatrice Runcorn); David Bamber (as Bernard Parker); David Lyon (as Marcus Hardman); Nicholas Selby (as Martin Johnstone); Meriel Dickinson (as Katherine Bird); Mark Fletcher (as Constable); William Osborne (as Receptionist); William Chubb (as Blake); Michael Packer (as Redfern); Richard Ryan (as Porter); Yitkin Seow (as Nacora)
The Mystery of the Spanish Chest	17 February 1991	Captain Hastings, Inspector Japp	Malcolm Sinclair (as Edward Clayton); Caroline Langrishe (as Marguerite Clayton); Pip Torrens (as Major Rich); John McEnery (as Colonel Curtiss); Catherine Bott (as Gilda); Peter Copley (as Burgoyne); John Noble (baritone) (as Rigoletto); Metin Yenal (as Umpire); Antonia Pemberton (as Lady Chatterton); Clem Davies (as Reporter); Roger Kemp (as Doctor); Christopher Lamb (as Party Dancer); Andy Mulligan (as Reporter); Richard Cawte (as Young Officer); Edward Clayton (as Rouse); Sam Smart (as Smithy); Melissa Wilson (as Maid); Victoria Scarborough (as Party Dancer)
The Theft of the Royal Ruby	24 February 1991		Stephanie Cole (as Mrs Lacey); Frederick Treves (as Colonel Lacey); Helena Michell (as Sarah Lacey); Robyn Moore (as Gloria Lee-Wortley); Robyn Moore (as Iris Moffatt); Jonathan R. Scott (as Colin); Iain Rattray (as Head Waiter); Gordon Reid (as Mr Dupre); Nigel Le Vaillant (as Desmond Lee-Wortley); Tariq Alibai (as Prince Farouq); Edward Holmes (as Michael); David Howey (as Jesmond); John Dunbar (as Peverill); Peter Aldwyn (as Durbridge); John Vernon (as David Welwyn); Christopher Leaver (as Parsloe); Susan Field (as Mrs Ross); Siobhan Garahy (as Annie Bates); Alessia Gwyther (as Bridget); James Taylor (as Waiter)
The Affair at the Victory Ball	3 March 1991	Captain Hastings, Inspector Japp, Miss Lemon	Nathaniel Parker (as Chris Davidson); Haydn Gwynne (as Coco Courtney); Andrew Burt (as James Ackerly); Charles Collingwood (as BBC Announcer); Mark Crowdy (as Viscount Cronshaw); Natalie Slater (as Mrs Davidson); Kate Harper (as Mrs Mallaby); David Henry (as Eustace Beltane); Brian Mitchell (as Second Actor); Bryan Matheson (as Butler); Sarah Crowden (as Receptionist)
The Mystery of Hunter's Lodge	10 March 1991	Captain Hastings, Inspector Japp	Bernard Horsfall (as Harrington Pace); Jim Norton (as Roger Havering); Denyse Alexander (as Mrs Middleton); Roy Boyd (as Jack Stoddard); Victoria Alcock (as Ellie); Raymond Trickitt (as Constable Cooke); Diana Kent (as Zoe Havering); Diana Kent (as Mrs Middleton); Shaughan Seymour (as Archie Havering); Arthur Whybrow (as Mr Anstruther); Christopher Scoular (as Sergeant Forgan); Clare Travers-Deacon (as Joan)

=== Series 4 (1992) ===
Title	UK airdate	Recurring cast	Guest cast
The A.B.C. Murders (feature-length)	5 January 1992	Captain Hastings, Inspector Japp	Donald Sumpter (as Alexander Bonaparte Cust); Nicholas Farrell (as Donald Fraser); Pippa Guard (as Megan Barnard); Cathryn Bradshaw (as Mary Drower); Donald Douglas (as Franklin Clarke); Michael Mellinger (as Franz Ascher); Peter Penry-Jones (as Superintendent Carter); Jeremy Hawk (as Deveril); David McAlister (as Inspector Glen); Pat Gorman (as Desk Sergeant); Gordon Salkilld (as Commissionaire); Nina Marc (as Thora Grey); Vivienne Burgess (as Lady Clarke); Ann Windsor (as Miss Merrion); Miranda Forbes (as Mrs Turton); Lucinda Curtis (as Mrs Marbury); Allan Mitchell (as Dr Kerr); Campbell Graham (as Mr Downes); Norman McDonald (as Mr Strange); John Breslin (as Mr Barnard); Philip Anthony (as Doctor); Clifford Milner (as Constable); Claude Close (as Doncaster Sergeant); Alex Knight (as Andover Sergeant); David Fox (as Scotland Yard Sergeant); Jane Birdsall (as Nurse); Andrew Williamson (as Man in Library)
Death in the Clouds (feature-length)	12 January 1992	Inspector Japp	Cathryn Harrison (as Cecily, Lady Horbury); Eve Pearce (as Madame Marie Giselle); Jenny Downham (as Anne Giselle); Sarah Woodward (as Jane Grey); Shaun Scott (as Norman Gale); Amanda Royle (as Venetia Kerr); George Rossi (as Mr Zeropoulos); Yves Aubert (as Airline clerk); Hana Maria Pravda (as Concierge); Harry Audley (as Raymond Barraclough); Roger Heathcott (as Daniel Clancy); Guy Manning (as Jean Dupont); Richard Ireson (as Inspector Fournier); David Firth (as Lord Horbury); Nick Mercer (as PC Roberts); John Bleasdale (as Mitchell); Gabrielle Lloyd (as Elise Grandier); Russell Richardson (as French Registrar); Raymond Sawyer (as Hotel Clerk); Hilary Waters (as Receptionist)
One, Two, Buckle My Shoe (feature-length)	19 January 1992	Inspector Japp	Laurence Harrington (as Dr Henry Morley); Peter Blythe (as Alistair Blunt); Joanna Phillips-Lane (as Gerda Grant); Christopher Eccleston (as Frank Carter); Kevork Malikyan (as Mr Amberiotis); Sara Stewart (as Jane Olivera); Rosalind Knight (as Georgina Morley); Joanna Phillips-Lane (as Helen Montressor); Bruce Alexander (as Albert Chapman); George Waring (as First Coroner); John Warner (as Second Coroner); Carolyn Colquhoun (as Mabelle Sainsbury-Seale); Helen Horton (as Julia Olivera); Karen Gledhill (as Gladys Neville); Trilby James (as Agnes Fletcher); Mary Healey (as Beryl Chapman); Oliver Bradshaw (as Mr Hendry); Jean Ainslie (as Alison Hendry); Joe Greco (as Alfred Biggs); Tom Durham (as Lionel Arnholt); David Bowles (as Sergeant Evans); Ben Bazell (as Sergeant Beddoes); John Carlin (as Dr Bennett); Dawn Keeler (as Mrs Pinner); Nigel Bellairs (as Mr Letheran); Stephen Bird (as Page Boy); Mark Heal (as Police Constable); Cassandra Holliday (as Receptionist); Nicolas Brook (as Waiter); Eileen Maciejewska (as Manageress); Chris Spicer (as Claudio); Alan Penn (as Antonio); Guy Oliver-Watts (as Benedick); John Peters (as Sergeant); Keith Woodhams (as Desk Clerk); Emma Grey (as Hopscotch Girl); Julie Smith (as Hopscotch Girl)

=== Series 5 (1993) ===
Title	UK airdate	Recurring cast	Guest cast
The Adventure of the Egyptian Tomb	17 January 1993	Captain Hastings, Miss Lemon	Bill Bailey (as Felix Bleibner); Paul Birchard (as Rupert Bleibner); Rolf Saxon (as Dr Robert Ames); Anna Cropper (as Lady Willard); Robert Wisdom (as Waiter); Olivier Pierre (as Dr Henry Schneider); Peter Reeves (as Dr John Willard); Simon Cowell-Parker (as Nigel Harper); Jon Strickland (as Dr Leonard Fosswell); Grant Thatcher (as Sir Guy Willard); Mozaffar Shafeie (as Hassan)
The Underdog	24 January 1993	Captain Hastings, Miss Lemon	Denis Lill (as Sir Reuben Astwell); Ann Bell (as Lady Astwell); Adie Allen (as Lily Margrave/Lily Naylor); Jonathan Phillips (as Charles Leverson); Ian Gelder (as Victor Astwell); Bill Wallis (as Horace Trefusis); Lucy Davidson (as Gladys); John Evitts (as Parsons); Andrew Seear (as Humphrey Naylor); Michael Vaughan (as Sergeant); Charles Armstrong (as Receptionist)
The Yellow Iris	31 January 1993	Captain Hastings, Miss Lemon	David Troughton (as Barton Russell); Geraldine Somerville (as Pauline Wetherby); Stefan Gryff (as General Pereira); Dorian Healy (as Anthony Chapell); Yolanda Vazquez (as Lola Valdez); Leonard Maguire (as Mr Grove); Joseph Long (as Luigi); Carol Kenyon (as Singer); Robin McCaffrey (as Iris Russell); Hugh Ross (as Stephen Carter); Tracy Miller (as Singer); Arturo Venegas (as Hotel Receptionist)
The Case of the Missing Will	7 February 1993	Captain Hastings, Inspector Japp, Miss Lemon	Mark Kingston (as Andrew Marsh); Beth Goddard (as Violet Wilson); Edward Atterton (as Robert Siddaway); Rowena Cooper (as Sarah Siddaway); Terrence Hardiman (as John Siddaway); Neil Stuke (as Peter Baker); Jon Laurimore (as Walter Baker); Richard Durden (as Dr Martin Pritchard); Gillian Hanna (as Margaret Baker); Susan Tracy (as Phyllida Campion); Stephen Oxley (as Doctor)
The Adventure of the Italian Nobleman	14 February 1993	Captain Hastings, Inspector Japp, Miss Lemon	David Neal (as Bruno Vizzini); Vincent Riotta (as Mario Ascanio); Janet Lees Price (as Miss Rider); Arthur Cox (as Dr Hawker); David Verrey (as Chef); Vittorio Amandola (as 1st Secretary); Sidney Kean (as Count Foscatini); Leonard Preston (as Mr Edwin Graves); Anna Mazzotti (as Margherita Fabbri); Michael Tudor Barnes (as Neighbour); Ben Bazell (as Sergeant Beddoes); Sara Kean (as Bridesmaid 1); Victoria Kean (as Bridesmaid 2); Alberto Janelli (as Darida); David Willoughby (as Lad); Barrie Wilmore (as Manager)
The Chocolate Box	21 February 1993	Inspector Japp	Anna Chancellor (as Virginie Mesnard); Lucy Cohu (as Marianne Deroulard); James Coombes (as Paul Deroulard); Rosalie Crutchley (as Madame Deroulard); David de Keyser (as Gaston Beaujeu); Geoffrey Whitehead (as Xavier St Alard); Mark Eden (as Superintendent Boucher); Preston Lockwood (as Francois); Jonathan Hackett (as Claude Chantalier); Jonathan Barlow (as Jean-Louis Ferraud); Michael Beint (as Coroner); Linda Broughton (as Denise); Kirsten Clark (as Jeanette); Richard Derrington (as Henri)
Dead Man's Mirror	28 February 1993	Captain Hastings, Inspector Japp	Iain Cuthbertson (as Gervase Chevenix); Emma Fielding (as Ruth Chevenix); Richard Lintern (as John Lake); Jeremy Northam (as Hugo Trent); Fiona Walker (as Miss Lingard); Zena Walker (as Vanda Chevenix); John Rolfe (as Registrar); Tushka Bergen (as Susan Cardwell); James Greene (as Snell); Derek Smee (as Auctioneer); Jon Croft (as Lawrence)
Jewel Robbery at the Grand Metropolitan	7 March 1993	Captain Hastings, Inspector Japp, Miss Lemon	Trevor Cooper (as Ed Opalsen); Sorcha Cusack (as Margaret Opalsen); Hermione Norris (as Celestine); Elizabeth Rider (as Grace Wilson); Simon Shepherd (as Andrew Hall); Arthur Cox (as Dr Hawker); Karl Johnson (as Saunders); Andrew Carr (as Hubert Devine); Tim Stern (as Bellboy); Eileen Dunwoodie (as Holidaymaker); Peter Kelly (as Lucky Len); Colin Stepney (as Guest); James McCusker (as Journalist); Simon Molloy (as Holidaymaker); Jo Powell (as Holidaymaker); Graham Rowe (as Manager)

=== Series 6 (1995–96) ===
All episodes are feature-length from this point onwards.

Title	UK airdate	Recurring cast	Guest cast
Hercule Poirot's Christmas	1 January 1995	Inspector Japp	Vernon Dobtcheff (as Simeon Lee); Simon Roberts (as Alfred Lee); Catherine Rabett (as Lydia Lee); Andree Bernard (as Magdalene Lee); Brian Gwaspari (as Harry Lee); Sasha Behar (as Pilar Estravados); Ayub Khan-Din (as Horbury); John Horsley (as Tressilian); Mark Tandy (as Superintendent Harold Sugden); Steve Delaney (as Sergeant Coombes); Olga Lowe (as Stella); Christopher Webber (as Train Steward); Peter Hughes (as Mr Charlton); Sasha Behar (as Conchita Lopez); Eric Carte (as George Lee); Scott Handy (as Young Simeon); Liese Benjamin (as Young Stella); Oscar Pearce (as Gerrit); Colin Meredith (as Shopkeeper); Joanna Dickens (as Cook); Michael Keats (as Constable)
Hickory Dickory Dock	12 February 1995	Inspector Japp, Miss Lemon	Sarah Badel (as Mrs Florence Hubbard); Rachel Bell (as Mrs Christina Nicoletis); Jonathan Firth (as Nigel Chapman); Damian Lewis (as Leonard Bateson); David Burke (as Sir Arthur Stanley); Andy Linden (as Giorgios Nicoletis); Terry Duggan (as Butcher); Gilbert Martin (as Colin McNabb); Jessica Lloyd (as Celia Austin); Paris Jefferson (as Sally Finch); Elinor Morriston (as Valerie Hobhouse); Polly Kemp (as Patricia Lane); Granville Saxton (as Mr John Casterman); Bernard Lloyd (as Mr Endicott); Mark Denny (as Jarrow Marcher); Tony Kirkwood (as Passport Officer); Peter Glancy (as Customs Officer); Alec Linstead (as Pharmacist); Brian McDermott (as Chief Inspector)
Murder on the Links	11 February 1996	Captain Hastings	Damien Thomas (as Paul Renauld); Diane Fletcher (as Eloise Renauld); Terence Beesley (as Gabriel Stonor); Richard Bebb (as News Commentator); Belinda Stewart-Wilson (as Secretary); Ben Pullen (as Jack Renauld); Sophie Linfield (as Marthe Daubreuil); Katherine Fahy (as Bernadette Daubreuil); Jacinta Mulcahy (as Isabel Duveen); Bill Moody (as Giraud); Bernard Latham (as Lucien Bex); Andrew Melville (as Dr Hautet); Henrietta Voigts (as Leonie); James Vaughan (as Adam Letts); Simon Holmes (as Projectionist); Ray Gatenby (as Station Master); Randal Herley (as Judge); Peter Yapp (as Lawyer); Terry Raven (as Tramp); Margaret Clifton (as Concierge); Tim Berrington (as Golfer); Howard Lee (as Golfer); Christopher Hammond (as Policeman); Joseph Morton (as Policeman)
Dumb Witness	16 March 1996	Captain Hastings	Ann Morrish (as Emily Arundell); Patrick Ryecart (as Charles Arundell); Kate Buffery (as Theresa Arundell); Paul Herzberg (as Dr Jacob Tanios); Julia St John (as Arabella Tanios); Norma West (as Wilhelmina Lawson); Jonathan Newth (as Dr John Grainger); Muriel Pavlow (as Julia Tripp); Geoffrey Freshwater (as Sgt Keeley); Sarah Stephenson (as Mrs Finch); Layla Harrison (as Katya); Pauline Jameson (as Isabel Tripp); Snubby (as Bob); Tobias Saunders (as Alexis); Stephen Tomlin (as Vicar); Pat O'Toole (as Sarah); Jestyn Phillips (as Steward); Geoffrey Banks (as Starter); Tim Williams (as American)

=== Series 7 (2000) ===
Title	UK airdate	Recurring cast	Guest cast
The Murder of Roger Ackroyd	2 January 2000	Inspector Japp	Oliver Ford Davies (as Dr James Sheppard); Selina Cadell (as Caroline Sheppard); Malcolm Terris (as Roger Ackroyd); Flora Montgomery (as Flora Ackroyd); Vivien Heilbron (as Mrs Vera Ackroyd); Daisy Beaumont (as Ursula Bourne); Jamie Bamber (as Ralph Paton); Rosalind Bailey (as Dorothy Ferrars); Clive Brunt (as Naval Petty Officer); Roger Frost (as Parker); Nigel Cooke (as Geoffrey Raymond); Gregor Truter (as Inspector Davis); Charles Simon (as Mr Hammond); Liz Kettle (as Mrs Folliott); Charles Early (as Constable Jones); Graham Chinn (as Landlord); Alice Hart (as Mary); Philip Wrigley (as Postman); Phil Atkinson (as Ted)
Lord Edgware Dies	19 February 2000	Captain Hastings, Inspector Japp, Miss Lemon	Helen Grace (as Jane Wilkinson); John Castle (as Lord Edgware); Fiona Allen (as Carlotta Adams); Dominic Guard (as Bryan Martin); Deborah Cornelius (as Penny Driver); Hannah Yelland (as Geraldine Marsh); Christopher Guard (as Alton); Fenella Woolgar (as Ellis); Jonathan Aris (as Receptionist); Iain Fraser (as Donald Ross); Lesley Nightingale (as Miss Carroll); Virginia Denham (as Alice); Tim Steed (as Ronald Marsh); Aliza James (as Lucie Adams); John Quentin (as Sir Montagu Corner); Janet Hargreaves (as Lady Corner); Tom Beard (as the Duke of Merton); Mark Brignal (as Addison); John Hart Dyke (as Thompson); Rory Firth (as Page Boy); Nicola Michaels (as Airport Clerk)

=== Series 8 (2001–02) ===
Title	UK airdate	Recurring cast	Guest cast
Evil Under the Sun (Note: DVD releases invert the order of series eight, placing Evil Under the Sun after Murder in Mesopotamia, and mislabelling the former episode's airdate as "15 December 2002" (which was the airdate for France), and the latter's airdate as "8 July 2001" (which was the U.S. airdate that aired first along with France's).)	20 April 2001	Captain Hastings, Inspector Japp, Miss Lemon	Michael Higgs (as Patrick Redfern); Tamzin Malleson (as Christine Redfern); Louise Delamere (as Arlena Stuart-Marshall); Carolyn Pickles (as Emily Brewster); Russell Tovey (as Lionel Marshall); Marsha Fitzalan (as Rosamund Darnley); Rosalind March (as Mrs Castle); Grant Gillespie (as Jack Lovett); Paul Ready (as William); Roger Alborough (as Chief Constable Weston); Michael Higgs (as Edward Deverill); Tamzin Malleson (as Jane Martindale); David Mallinson (as Kenneth Marshall); Tim Meats (as Reverend Stephen Lane); Ian Thompson (as Major Barry); David Timson (as Horace Blatt); Rebecca Johnson (as Gladys Narracott); Jason Davies (as Nathan Lloyd); Lawrence McGrandles Jr (as Simon Kelso); Guy Vincent (as Barman); Harriet Eastcott (as Librarian); Steve Bennett (as Policeman); Kevin Moore (as Coroner); Kenneth Gilbert (as Mr Applegood); Andrew MacBean (as Waiter); Andrew Ashby (as Officer)
Murder in Mesopotamia	2 June 2002 (Note: Aired on 8 July 2001 in France and US.)	Captain Hastings	Iain Mitchell (as Superintendent Maitland); Pandora Clifford (as Sheila Maitland); Alexi Kaye Campbell (as Joseph Mercado); Christopher Bowen (as Richard Carey); Hichem Rostom (as Hotel Receptionist); Ron Berglas (as Dr Eric Leidner); Dinah Stabb (as Anne Johnson); Georgina Sowerby (as Amy Leatheran); Jeremy Turner-Welch (as Bill Coleman); Deborah Poplett (as Mrs Mercado); Christopher Hunter (as Father Lavigny); Ron Berglas (as Frederick Bosner); Kamel Touati (as Squat Man); Zouheir Bornaz (as Police Sergeant); Dejeb Magri (as Murdered Man); Hammadi Maaroufi (as Workman); Ramzi Brari (as Abdullah)

=== Series 9 (2003–04) ===
Title	UK airdate	Recurring cast	Guest cast
Five Little Pigs	14 December 2003		Rachael Stirling (as Caroline Crale); Aidan Gillen (as Amyas Crale); Aimee Mullins (as Lucy Crale); Toby Stephens (as Philip Blake); Marc Warren (as Meredith Blake); Julie Cox (as Elsa Greer); Gemma Jones (as Miss Williams); Sophie Winkleman (as Angela Warren); Talulah Riley (as Young Angela); Patrick Malahide (as Depleach); Annette Badland (as Mrs Spriggs); Roger Brierley (as Judge); Melissa Suffield (as Young Lucy); Lottie Unwin (as Young Caroline); Darien Smith (as Young Amyas); Jacek Bilinski (as Young Philip); Joel de Temperley (as Young Meredith); Richard Teverson (as Hollinghurst)
Sad Cypress	26 December 2003		Elisabeth Dermot Walsh (as Elinor Carlisle); Rupert Penry-Jones (as Roddy Winter); Kelly Reilly (as Mary Gerrard); Paul McGann (as Dr Peter Lord); Phyllis Logan (as Nurse Hopkins); Diana Quick (as Mrs Laura Welman); Timothy Carlton (as Judge); Stuart Laing (as Ted Horlick); Jack Galloway (as Inspector Marsden); Geoffrey Beevers (as Seddon); Marion O'Dwyer (as Nurse O'Brien); Linda Spurrier (as Mrs Bishop); Alistair Findlay (as Prosecuting Counsel); Louise Callaghan (as Hunterbury Maid)
Death on the Nile	12 April 2004		James Fox (as Colonel Race); JJ Feild (as Simon Doyle); Emily Blunt (as Linnet Ridgeway-Doyle); Emma Griffiths Malin (as Jacqueline de Bellefort); David Soul (as Andrew Pennington); Judy Parfitt (as Marie Van Schuyler); Daisy Donovan (as Cornelia Robson); Barbara Flynn (as Mrs Allerton); Daniel Lapaine (as Tim Allerton); Frances de la Tour (as Salome Otterbourne); Zoe Telford (as Rosalie Otterbourne); Alastair Mackenzie (as Mr Ferguson); Steve Pemberton (as Dr Bessner); Félicité Du Jeu (as Louise Bourget); George Yiasoumi (as Cruise Manager); Elodie Kendall (as Joanna Southwood)
The Hollow	26 April 2004		Jonathan Cake (as Dr John Christow); Megan Dodds (as Henrietta Savernake); Claire Price (as Gerda Christow); Edward Hardwicke (as Sir Henry Angkatell); Sarah Miles (as Lady Lucy Angkatell); Jamie de Courcey (as Edward Angkatell); Lysette Anthony (as Veronica Cray); Tom Georgeson (as Inspector Grange); Edward Fox (as Gudgeon); Paula Jacobs (as Mrs Pearstock); Teresa Churcher (as Elsie Patterson); Lucy Briers (as Beryl Collins); Caroline Martin (as Midge Hardcastle); Dale Rapley (as Sergeant Coombes); Harriet Cobbold (as Simmons); Andrew Watson (as Young Officer); Ian Talbot (as Victor Simms); Angela Curran (as Frances Simms)

=== Series 10 (2006) ===
Title	UK airdate	Recurring cast	Guest cast
The Mystery of the Blue Train	1 January 2006 (Note: Aired on 11 December 2005 in France and US.)		Elliott Gould (as Rufus Van Aldin); Lindsay Duncan (as Lady Tamplin); Tom Harper (as Corky Tamplin); Alice Eve (as Lenox Tamplin); Jaime Murray (as Ruth Kettering); James D'Arcy (as Derek Kettering); Nicholas Farrell (as Major Richard Knighton); Bronagh Gallagher (as Ada Mason); Georgina Rylance (as Katherine Grey); Oliver Milburn (as Count de la Roche); Josette Simon (as Mirelle Milesi); Roger Lloyd-Pack (as Inspector Caux); Jane How (as Lady at Ball); Samuel James (as Steward); Helen Lindsay (as Sister Rosalia); Etela Pardo (as Dolores)
Cards on the Table (Note: DVD releases invert the order of Cards on the Table and After the Funeral.)	19 March 2006 (Note: Aired on 11 December 2005 in France.)	Ariadne Oliver	Alexander Siddig (as Mr Shaitana); Tristan Gemmill (as Major Despard); Alex Jennings (as Dr Roberts); Lesley Manville (as Mrs Lorrimer); Lyndsey Marshal (as Anne Meredith); Robert Pugh (as Colonel Hughes); David Westhead (as Superintendent Jim Wheeler); Honeysuckle Weeks (as Rhoda Dawes); Lucy Liemann (as Miss Burgess); Philip Bowen (as Mr Luxmore); Cordelia Bugeja (as Mrs Luxmore); Zigi Ellison (as Dorothy Craddock); Jennie Ogilvie (as Millie); Douglas Reith (as Serge Mureau); James Alper (as Shaitana's Butler); Philip Wright (as Sergeant O'Connor)
After the Funeral	26 March 2006 (Note: Aired on 11 December 2005 in France.)		Robert Bathurst (as Gilbert Entwhistle); Geraldine James (as Helen Abernethie); Michael Fassbender (as George Abernethie); Julian Ovenden (as Michael Shane); Fiona Glascott (as Rosamund Shane); Monica Dolan (as Miss Gilchrist); Lucy Punch (as Susannah Henderson); Benjamin Whitrow (as Timothy Abernethie); Anna Calder-Marshall (as Maude Abernethie); William Russell (as Lanscombe); Kevin Doyle (as Inspector Morton); Dominic Jephcott (as Dr Larraby); Anthony Valentine (as Giovanni Gallaccio); John Carson (as Richard Abernethie); Monica Dolan (as Cora Gallaccio); Annabel Scholey (as Miss Sorrell); Philip Anthony (as Vicar); Vicky Ogden (as Janet)
Taken at the Flood	2 April 2006	George, Harold Spence	Jenny Agutter (as Adela Marchmont); Amanda Douge (as Lynn Marchmont); Patrick Baladi (as Rowley Cloade); Elliot Cowan (as David Hunter); Pip Torrens (as Jeremy Cloade); Penny Downie (as Frances Cloade); Celia Imrie (as Kathy Cloade-Woodward); Tim Pigott-Smith (as Dr Lionel Woodward); Richard Hope (as Superintendent Harold Spence); Nicholas Le Prevost (as Major Porter); Elizabeth Spriggs (as Mrs Leadbetter); Tim Woodward (as Enoch Arden); Tim Woodward (as Charles Trenton); Eva Birthistle (as Eileen Corrigan); Richard Durden (as Pebmarsh); Claire Hackett (as Beatrice Lippincott); Martha Barnett (as Rosaleen Cloade)

=== Series 11 (2008–09) ===
Title	UK airdate	Recurring cast	Guest cast
Mrs McGinty's Dead	14 September 2008 (Note: Aired on 1 September 2008 in Sweden.)	Ariadne Oliver, George, Harold Spence	Joe Absolom (as James Bentley); Sarah Smart (as Maude Williams); Paul Rhys (as Robin Upward); Siân Phillips (as Mrs Laura Upward); Simon Shepherd (as Dr Rendell); Amanda Root (as Shelagh Rendell); Ruth Gemmell (as Miss Sweetiman); Raquel Cassidy (as Maureen Summerhayes); Richard Dillane (as Major Summerhayes); Mary Stockley (as Eve Carpenter); Richard Lintern (as Guy Carpenter); Richard Hope (as Superintendent Harold Spence); Catherine Russell (as Pamela Horsfall); Paul Rhys (as Evelyn Hope); Emma Amos (as Bessie Burch); Billy Geraghty (as Joe Burch); Simon Molloy (as District Judge); Lexie Lambert (as Eva Kane)
Cat Among the Pigeons	21 September 2008 (Note: Aired on 8 September 2008 in Sweden.)		Harriet Walter (as Honoria Bulstrode); Elizabeth Berrington (as Grace Springer); Susan Wooldridge (as Lettice Chadwick); Claire Skinner (as Eileen Rich); Carol MacReady (as Elspeth Johnson); Miranda Raison (as Louise Blanche); Natasha Little (as Ann Shapland); Amanda Abbington (as Miss Blake); Adam Croasdell (as Adam Goodman); Pippa Haywood (as Mrs Upjohn); Raji James (as Prince Ali Yusef); Amara Karan (as Princess Shaista); Anton Lesser (as Inspector Kelsey); Jo Woodcock (as Jennifer Sutcliffe); Jane How (as Lady Veronica); Katie Leung (as Hsui Tai Wan); Georgie Glen (as Mrs Forbes); Don Gallagher (as Mr Forbes); Georgia Cornick (as Patricia Forbes); Lois Edmett (as Julia Upjohn); Adam De Ville (as Bob Rawlinson)
Third Girl	28 September 2008 (Note: Aired on 15 September 2008 in Sweden.)	Ariadne Oliver, George	Jemima Rooper (as Norma Restarick); Matilda Sturridge (as Frances Cary); Clemency Burton-Hill (as Claudia Reece-Holland); James Wilby (as Andrew Restarick); Peter Bowles (as Sir Roderick Horsfield); Lucy Liemann (as Sonia Benson); Tom Mison (as David Baker); John Warnaby (as Inspector Nelson); Haydn Gwynne (as Miss Battersby); Caroline O'Neill (as Nanny Lavinia Seagram); Tim Stern (as Alf Renny); Simon Hill (as Bus Ticket Inspector); Ysobel Gonzales (as Nurse); Sean Kingsley (as Policeman); Jade Longley (as Young Norma Restarick); Juliet Howland (as Mary Restarick); Tessa Bell-Briggs (as Daphne the Waitress)
Appointment with Death	25 December 2009 (Note: Aired on 22 September 2008 in Sweden, and released on DVD in the UK on 6 October 2008.)		Tim Curry (as Lord Boynton); Cheryl Campbell (as Leonora, Lady Boynton); Tom Riley (as Raymond Boynton); Emma Cunniffe (as Carol Boynton); John Hannah (as Dr Theodore Gerard); Elizabeth McGovern (as Dame Celia Westholme); Mark Gatiss (as Leonard Boynton); Christina Cole (as Dr Sarah King); Paul Freeman (as Colonel Carbury); Christian McKay (as Jefferson Cope); Beth Goddard (as Sister Agnieszka); Angela Pleasence (as Nanny Taylor); Zoe Boyle (as Jinny Boynton); Jawad Elalami (as Labourer); Abdelkader Aizoun (as Concierge); Badri Mansour (as Taxi Driver); Zakaria Atifi (as Mahmoud)

=== Series 12 (2010–11) ===
Title	UK airdate	Recurring cast	Guest cast
Three Act Tragedy	3 January 2010 (Note: Aired on 1 January 2010 in Norway.)	George	Martin Shaw (as Sir Charles Cartwright); Art Malik (as Sir Bartholomew Strange); Kate Ashfield (as Muriel Wills); Kimberley Nixon (as Egg Lytton Gore); Jane Asher (as Lady Mary Lytton Gore); Tom Wisdom (as Oliver Manders); Suzanne Bertish (as Miss Milray); Ronan Vibert (as Captain Derek Dacres); Anastasia Hille (as Cynthia Dacres); Anna Carteret (as Mrs Babbington); Tony Maudsley (as Superintendent Crossfield); Prue Clarke (as Matron); Nigel Pegram (as Reverend Stephen Babbington); Jodie McNee (as Annie); Michael Hobbs (as Coroner); James Hurran (as French Boy)
Hallowe'en Party	27 October 2010 (Note: Aired on 26 May 2010 in Sweden.)	Ariadne Oliver, George	Amelia Bullmore (as Judith Butler); Deborah Findlay (as Rowena Drake); Georgia King (as Frances Drake); Ian Hallard (as Edmund Drake); Julian Rhind-Tutt (as Michael Garfield); Sophie Thompson (as Mrs Reynolds); Eric Sykes (as Mr Fullerton); Fenella Woolgar (as Elizabeth Whittaker); Timothy West (as Reverend Cottrell); Paola Dionisotti (as Mrs Goodbody); Phyllida Law (as Mrs Louise Llewellyn-Smythe); Vera Filatova (as Olga Seminoff); Mary Higgins (as Miranda Butler); Paul Thornley (as Inspector Raglan); Macy Nyman (as Joyce Reynolds); Richard Breislin (as Leopold Reynolds)
Murder on the Orient Express (Note: Murder on the Orient Express was intended as the first episode of series twelve, but was held back until Christmas 2010 as a consequence of Appointment with Death's broadcast the previous year. All DVD releases restore the intended episode order.)	25 December 2010 (Note: Aired on 11 July 2010 in US.)		Toby Jones (as Samuel Ratchett/Cassetti); Jessica Chastain (as Mary Debenham); David Morrissey (as John Arbuthnot); Eileen Atkins (as Princess Natalia Dragomiroff); Susanne Lothar (as Hildegarde Schmidt); Hugh Bonneville (as Edward Masterman); Barbara Hershey (as Caroline Hubbard/Linda Arden); Brian J. Smith (as Hector MacQueen); Marie-Josée Croze (as Greta Ohlsson); Joseph Mawle (as Antonio Foscarelli); Stanley Weber (as Count Andrenyi); Elena Satine (as Countess Helena Andrenyi); Samuel West (as Dr Constantine); Denis Ménochet (as Pierre Michel); Sam Crane (as Lieutenant Blanchflower); Serge Hazanavicius (as Xavier Bouc); Tristan Shepherd (as Lieutenant Morris); Stewart Scudamore (as Concierge)
The Clocks (Note: The Clocks was intended to be placed before Hallowe'en Party, but in the UK ITV did not initially schedule its broadcast in favour of the latter episode and Murder on the Orient Express. All DVD releases restore the intended episode order.)	26 December 2011 (Note: Aired on 30 December 2009 in Norway, and released on DVD in January 2011.)		Tom Burke (as Lieutenant Colin Race); Jaime Winstone (as Sheila Webb); Anna Massey (as Millicent Pebmarsh); Lesley Sharp (as Miss Kathy Martindale); Sinead Keenan (as Nora Brent); Phil Daniels (as Inspector Hardcastle); Stephen Boxer (as Christopher Mabbutt); Frances Barber (as Merlina Rival); Geoffrey Palmer (as Vice Admiral Hamling); Beatie Edney (as Mrs Hemmings); Jason Watkins (as Joe Bland); Tessa Peake-Jones (as Valerie Bland); Abigail Thaw (as Rachel Waterhouse); Guy Henry (as Matthew Waterhouse); Olivia Grant (as Annabel Larkin); Anna Skellern (as Fiona Hanbury); Andrew Havill (as Sven Hjerson); Victoria Wicks (as Mrs Swinburne); Phoebe Strickland (as May Mabbutt); Isabella Parriss (as Jenny Mabbutt); Andrew Forbes (as Professor Purdy); Ben Righton (as Constable Jenkins)

=== Series 13 (2013) ===
Title	UK airdate	Recurring cast	Guest cast
Elephants Can Remember	9 June 2013	Ariadne Oliver	Adrian Lukis (as General Alistair Ravenscroft); Annabel Mullion (as Lady Margaret Ravenscroft); Vanessa Kirby (as Celia Ravenscroft); Ferdinand Kingsley (as Desmond Burton-Cox); Greta Scacchi (as Mrs Burton-Cox); Iain Glen (as Dr David Willoughby); Claire Cox (as Dorothea Jarrow); Caroline Blakiston (as Julia Carstairs); Ruth Sheen (as Madame Rosentelle); Hazel Douglas (as Mrs Matcham); Maxine Evans (as Mrs Buckle); Vincent Regan (as Detective Inspector Beale); Danny Webb (as Superintendent Bill Garroway); Alexandra Dowling (as Marie McDermott); Elsa Mollien (as Zélie Rouselle); Jo-Anne Stockham (as Mrs Willoughby)
The Big Four	23 October 2013 (Note: Aired on 4 October 2013 in Poland.)	Captain Hastings, AC Japp, Miss Lemon, George	Michael Culkin (as Dr Ivan Savaranoff); Patricia Hodge (as Régine Olivier); Sarah Parish (as Flossie Monro); Steven Pacey (as Stephen Paynter); Teresa Banham (as Diana Paynter); Simon Lowe (as Dr Quentin); Jack Farthing (as Gerald Paynter); Tom Brooke (as Lawrence Boswell Tysoe); Nicholas Burns (as Inspector Meadows); Nicholas Day (as John Ingles); Simon Lowe (as Claud Darrell); Ian Hallard (as Mercutio); James Carroll Jordan (as Abe Ryland); Peter Symonds (as Jonathan Whalley); Barbara Kirby (as Betsy Andrews); Alex Palmer (as Robert Grant); Lou Broadbent (as Mabel Palmer)
Dead Man's Folly	30 October 2013	Ariadne Oliver	Sean Pertwee (as Sir George Stubbs); Stephanie Leonidas (as Hattie Stubbs); Sinéad Cusack (as Amy Folliat); Rebecca Front (as Amanda Brewis); Martin Jarvis (as Captain Jim Warburton); Rosalind Ayres (as Mrs Enid Warburton); James Anderson (as Michael Weyman); Daniel Weyman (as Alec Legge); Emma Hamilton (as Sally Legge); Sam Kelly (as John Merdell); Tom Ellis (as Detective Inspector Bland); Nicholas Woodeson (as Sergeant Hoskins); Elliot Barnes-Worrell (as Etienne de Sousa); Ella Geraghty (as Marlene Tucker); Angel Witney (as Gertie Tucker); Chris Gordon (as Stan Bickford); Richard Dixon (as Henden); Francesca Zoutewelle (as the Dutch Girl Hiker)
The Labours of Hercules	6 November 2013 (Note: Aired on 1 November 2013 in Poland.)	Vera Rossakoff	Orla Brady (as Countess Vera Rossakoff); Eleanor Tomlinson (as Alice Cunningham); Rupert Evans (as Harold Waring); Simon Callow (as Dr Heinrich Lutz); Nigel Lindsay (as Francesco Risatto); Morven Christie (as Elsie Clayton); Tom Wlaschiha (as Mr Schwartz); Fiona O'Shaughnessy (as Katrina Samoushenka); Nicholas McGaughey (as Inspector Lementeuil); Patrick Ryecart (as Sir Anthony Morgan); Tom Chadbon (as Dr Burton); Stephen Frost (as Chief Inspector); Sandy McDade (as Annabel Rice); Tom Austen (as Ted Williams); Lorna Nickson Brown (as Lucinda Le Mesurier); Richard Katz (as Gustave); Isobel Middleton (as Policewoman)
Curtain: Poirot's Last Case	13 November 2013	Captain Hastings, George	Shaun Dingwall (as Dr John Franklin); Anna Madeley (as Barbara Franklin); Claire Keelan (as Nurse Craven); Philip Glenister (as Sir William Boyd-Carrington); John Standing (as Colonel Toby Luttrell); Anne Reid (as Daisy Luttrell); Alice Orr-Ewing (as Judith Hastings); Helen Baxendale (as Elizabeth Cole); Matthew McNulty (as Major Allerton); Aidan McArdle (as Stephen Norton); Adam Englander (as Curtiss); Gregory Cox (as Coroner)

== See also ==
- Hercule Poirot in literature
