= Ann Jonas =

American author (1932–2013)

- Born: January 28, 1932; New York City
- Died: September 29, 2013 (aged 81); Rhinebeck, NY
- Known for: Illustration, Writing
- Spouse: Donald Crews (m. 1963)
- Children: 2, including Nina Crews

Ann Jonas (January 28, 1932 – September 29, 2013) was a writer and illustrator of several picture books for children. Her books often used odd, abstract images to stretch children's imaginations.

== Biography ==
Jonas lived in Long Island for most of her childhood. She enjoyed horseback riding, and became a babysitter to help raise funds for her rides. Her interest in art was recognized and nurtured by her parents. Her teachers also encouraged her by allowing her to design and paint the sets of plays. After many disappointing jobs, she decided to attend Cooper Union for the Advancement of Science and Art. After graduation, she began work in graphic design, and married fellow artist Donald Crews. After her husband was drafted into the U.S. Army in 1963, they moved to Frankfurt, Germany. Their first daughter, Nina Crews, was born in Germany, and their second, Amy, was born a year later in New York. Nina Crews would grow up to become a children's author as well.

When they returned to the United States, Jonas continued her work in graphic art, while her husband began to focus on illustrating children's books. Many years later, when their daughters were almost ready for college, Jonas wrote and illustrated her first children's book When You Were a Baby, in 1982, although it wouldn't be published for another nine years. Her 1983 book Round Trip was recognized as an ALA Notable Book and a New York Times "Best Illustrated Book".

Jonas and her husband lived in the state of New York in an old restored farmhouse overlooking the Hudson River and the Catskill Mountains.

== Bibliography ==
- Two Bear Cubs (1982)
- When You Were a Baby (1982)
- Round Trip (1983)
- Holes and Peeks (1984) A 1985 Caldecott Honor Book.
- The Quilt (1984), ISBN 978-0688038250
- The Trek (1985)
- Where Can It Be? (1986)
- Now We Can Go (1986)
- Reflections (1987)
- Color Dance (1989)
- Aardvarks, Disembark! (1990)
- The 13th Clue (1992)
- Splash! (1995), ISBN 9780688152840
- Watch William Walk (1997)
- Bird Talk (1998)

=== As illustrator ===
- Stars Beneath Your Bed: The Surprising Story of Dust, written by April Pulley Sayre (2005), ISBN 9780060571887
