= Nina Crews =

American children's writer (born 1963)

Nina Crews (born May 19, 1963) is a children's author; she is the daughter of Donald Crews and Ann Jonas, both children's authors and illustrators themselves. She uses photographs and photocollages in her books to illustrate vibrant stories about young children. Crews currently lives with her husband and son in Brooklyn, New York.

== Early life and education ==
Crews was born in Frankfurt, Germany, while her father was in the U.S. Army.

Crews received a Bachelor of Arts in Art from Yale University.

== Books ==
- A Girl Like Me (2020)
- Seeing Into Tomorrow (2018)
- Below (2015)
- Jack and the Beanstalk (2011)
- The Neighborhood Sing-Along (2011)
- Sky-High Guy (2010)
- I’ll Catch the Moon (2005)
- The Neighborhood Mother Goose (2004)
- A Ghost Story (2001)
- A High, Low, Near, Far, Loud, Quiet Story (1999)
- You Are Here (1998)
- Snowball (1997)
- One Hot Summer Day (1995)
