= Poirot Investigates =

1924 Poirot short story collection by Agatha Christie

- Dust jacket illustration of the first UK edition
- Author: Agatha Christie
- Cover artist: W. Smithson Broadhead
- Language: English
- Series: Hercule Poirot
- Genre: Detective fiction
- Publisher: The Bodley Head
- Publication date: March 1924
- Publication place: United Kingdom
- Media type: Print (hardback & paperback)
- Pages: 310 (first edition, hardcover)
- Preceded by: The Murder on the Links
- Followed by: The Murder of Roger Ackroyd
- Text: Poirot Investigates at Wikisource

Poirot Investigates is a short story collection written by English author Agatha Christie and first published in the UK by The Bodley Head in March 1924. In the eleven stories, the famed eccentric detective Hercule Poirot solves a variety of mysteries involving greed, jealousy, and revenge. The American version of this book, published by Dodd, Mead and Company in 1925, featured a further three stories. The UK first edition featured an illustration of Poirot on the dust jacket by W. Smithson Broadhead, reprinted from the 21 March 1923 issue of The Sketch magazine.

The UK edition retailed at seven shillings and sixpence (7/6) while the 1925 US edition was $2.00.

== Plot summaries ==
Note: the plots of the televised versions differ from these originals.

=== The Adventure of the Western Star ===
Poirot receives a visit from Miss Mary Marvell, the famous American film star on her visit to London. She has received three letters, handed to her by a Chinese man, which warn her to return her fabulous diamond jewel, the "Western Star", to where it came from – the left eye of an idol – before the next full moon. Her husband, Gregory Rolf, who bought it from a Chinese man in San Francisco, gave her the jewel three years ago. The pair are going to stay at Yardly Chase, the home of Lord and Lady Yardly when the moon is next full to discuss the making of a film there and Mary is determined to go with her diamond. Both Poirot and Hastings remember society gossip from three years back that linked Rolf and Lady Yardly. The Yardlys also own an identical diamond that came from the right eye of the idol – the Star of the East. After Mary has gone Poirot goes out and Hastings receives a visit from Lady Yardly, who was advised to visit Poirot by her friend Mary Cavendish. Hastings deduces that she too has received warning letters. Her husband plans to sell their jewel as he is in debt. When Poirot learns this he arranges to visit Yardly Chase and is there when the lights go out and Lady Yardly is attacked by a Chinese man and her jewel stolen. The next day, Mary's jewel is stolen from her London hotel. Poirot makes his investigations and returns the Yardlys' jewel to them.

Poirot tells Hastings that there never were two jewels or any Chinese man – it was all an invention by Rolf. Three years before in the United States he had an affair with Lady Yardly and blackmailed her into giving him the diamond which he then gave to his wife as a wedding present. Lady Yardly's was a paste copy that would have been discovered when her husband sold it. She was starting to push back against her blackmailer and Rolf arranged the deception against his wife that Lady Yardly copied when Hastings told her of the threats. Poirot's threats manage to persuade Rolf to give the real diamond back and leave the Yardlys in peace.

=== The Tragedy at Marsdon Manor ===
Poirot is asked by a friend, who is the director of the Northern Union Insurance Company, to investigate the case of a middle-aged man who died of an internal haemorrhage just a few weeks after insuring his life for fifty thousand pounds. There were rumours that Mr Maltravers was in a difficult financial position and the suggestion has been made that he paid the insurance premiums and then committed suicide for the benefit of his beautiful young wife. Poirot and Hastings travel to Marsdon Manor in Essex where the dead man was found in the grounds, with a small rook rifle by his side. They interview the widow and can find nothing wrong. They are leaving when a young man, Captain Black, arrives. A gardener tells Poirot that he visited the house the day before the death. Poirot interviews Black and by using word association finds out that he knew of someone who committed suicide with a rook rifle in East Africa when he was there.

Poirot figures out that this story, told at the dinner table the day before the tragedy, gave Mrs Maltravers the idea of how to kill her husband by making him demonstrate to her how the victim would have put the gun in his mouth and then pulling the trigger. A maid claims to see Mr Maltravers standing in the hall; shortly afterward, the lights suddenly go out. Mr Maltravers appears in the room, his index finger glowing and pointing at his wife's hand, which is now covered in blood. Terrified, she confesses to the murder. Poirot reveals that he hired an actor to impersonate the victim, and that he gripped Mrs. Maltravers' hand to mark it with fake blood when the lights went out.

=== The Adventure of the Cheap Flat ===
Hastings is at a friend's house with several other people when the talk turns to flats and houses. Mrs Robinson tells the party how she and her husband have managed to obtain a flat in Knightsbridge for a very attractive price. Poirot is interested and decides to investigate. The porter at the flat tells them that the Robinsons have been there for six months, despite Mrs Robinson's telling Hastings they had only just obtained the lease. Poirot rents another flat in the building and, by use of the coal lift, manages to gain entry to the Robinsons' flat and fix the locks so he can enter at will. Inspector Japp tells Poirot that important American naval plans were stolen from that country by an Italian called Luigi Valdarno who managed to pass them to a suspected spy for Japan, Elsa Hardt, before being killed in New York. Hardt and an accomplice then fled the United States for England.

That night, when the Robinsons' flat is empty, Poirot and Hastings lie in wait and apprehend another Italian who has come to kill Hardt and her accomplice in revenge for the death of Valdarno. They disarm the man and take him to another house in London, which Poirot has verified as the spies' new residence. The pair had rented the Knightsbridge flat under the name of Robinson, but moved out upon discovering that an Italian gang was targeting them. The spies rented the flat cheaply to a real couple of the same name whose wife roughly matched Elsa's description, in the hope that they would be killed in the spies' place. Hardt reveals the hiding place of the plans before the Italian tries to shoot her with an empty revolver and escapes; Japp arrests the spies, and an agent of the United States Secret Service recovers the plans.

=== The Mystery of Hunter's Lodge ===
Poirot and Hastings receive a visit from a Mr Roger Havering, the second son of a Baronet who is married to an actress. Mr Havering stayed at his club in London the previous evening and the following morning received a telegram from his wife saying that his Uncle Harrington Pace was murdered the previous evening and to come at once with a detective. As Poirot is indisposed, Hastings sets off with Havering for the scene of the crime.

Mr Pace, the brother of Mr Havering's mother, owns a hunting lodge on the Derbyshire moors. When Hastings and Havering arrive there they meet Inspector Japp as Scotland Yard has been called. As Havering goes off with Japp, Hastings speaks with the housekeeper, Mrs Middleton, who tells him she showed a black-bearded man into the house the previous evening who wanted to see Mr Pace. She and Mrs Zoe Havering were outside the room where the two men were talking when they heard a shot. The door to the room was locked but they found an open window; gaining entry, they found Mr Pace dead, shot by one of two pistols on display in the room. The pistol and the man are now missing.

Mrs Middleton sends Zoe Havering to see Hastings and she confirms the housekeeper's story. Japp confirms Havering's alibi for his train times to London and his attendance at the club. Soon the missing pistol is found dumped in Ealing. Hastings wires to Poirot with the facts, but Poirot is interested only in the clothes worn by and descriptions of Mrs Middleton and Mrs Havering. Poirot wires back to arrest Mrs Middleton at once but she disappears before this can happen. Upon investigation, no trace can be found of her existence, either from the agency that sent her or how she reached Derbyshire.

Once Hastings is back in London, Poirot gives Hastings his theory – Mrs Middleton never existed. She was Zoe Havering in disguise. Only Mr Havering claims to have seen the two women together at the same time. Havering did go to London with one of the pistols which he dumped and Mrs Havering shot her uncle with the other pistol. Japp is convinced of the theory but does not have enough evidence to make an arrest. The Haverings inherit their uncle's fortune but not for long: the two are soon killed in an aeroplane crash.

=== The Million Dollar Bond Robbery ===
The fiancée of Philip Ridgeway asks Poirot to clear his name in the theft of $1 million in Liberty bonds issued by the bank for which he works. Ridgeway explains to Poirot that he had been entrusted by the managers, Mr Shaw and Mr Vavasour (Ridgeway's uncle), to transport the bonds by ship across the Atlantic Ocean for sale in the United States. They had been counted out in his presence in London, sealed in a packet, and placed in his trunk, which was fitted with a lock for which only he and the managers had keys. A few hours before the ship arrived in New York, Ridgeway discovered that someone had tried to force the lock, but then picked it and stolen the bonds. The ship and its personnel and passengers were thoroughly searched, but no trace of them was found. Following the theft, the bonds were being offered for sale in New York so quickly that one broker claimed to have bought some even before the ship had docked.

After Vavasour states that Shaw has just recovered from a bout of bronchitis, Poirot and Hastings travel to Liverpool, where the ship has recently returned from its ocean crossing. Learning from the stewards that an elderly invalid man occupied the cabin adjacent to Ridgeway's and hardly ever left it, Poirot declares the case solved and sends an explanation to Scotland Yard so the police can arrest the thief. The culprit is Shaw, who had prepared a duplicate dummy packet and given it to Ridgeway prior to the crossing. Shaw had sent the real bonds on a faster ship, with instructions for an accomplice to begin selling them just after Ridgeway docked, and boarded Ridgeway's ship in disguise to steal the duplicate (using the key he carried) and throw it overboard. Upon reaching New York, Shaw booked return passage on the first available ship so that he could reach London in time to establish his cover story.

=== The Adventure of the Egyptian Tomb ===
Lady Willard, widow of the famous Egyptologist Sir John Willard, consults Poirot. Her husband was the archaeologist on the excavation of the tomb of the Pharaoh Men-her-Ra together with an American financier, Mr Bleibner. Both men died within a fortnight of each other, Sir John of heart failure and Mr Bleibner of blood poisoning. A few days later Bleibner's nephew, Rupert, shot himself and the press is full of stories of an Egyptian curse. Lady Willard's son, Guy, has now gone out to Egypt to continue his father's work and she fears that he will die next. To Hastings' surprise, Poirot states that he believes in the forces of superstition and agrees to investigate. Poirot cables New York for details concerning Rupert Bleibner. The young man was travelling in the South Seas and borrowed enough money to take him to Egypt. His uncle refused to advance him a penny, and the nephew returned to New York, where he sank lower and lower and then shot himself, leaving a suicide note saying that he was a leper and an outcast.

Poirot and Hastings travel to Egypt and join the expedition, only to find that there has been another death in the party, that of an American by tetanus. As Poirot investigates the dig, he feels the forces of evil at work. One night, an Arab servant delivers Poirot his cup of chamomile tea. Hastings hears Poirot choking, after drinking the tea. He fetches the expedition surgeon, Dr Ames. This is, however, a pretext to get the doctor into their tent where Poirot orders Hastings to secure him. The doctor, however, quickly swallows a lethal cyanide capsule.

Poirot explains that Rupert was Bleibner's heir, and the doctor, secretly, must have been Rupert's heir. Sir John died of natural causes. His death started superstitious speculation. Everyone assumed that Rupert's friend in the camp was his uncle but that could not have been the case as they argued so frequently. Despite having no money, Rupert returned to New York, which shows that he did have an ally in the expedition. This was a false ally – the doctor, who told Rupert he had contracted leprosy in the South Seas and it must be part of the curse. Rupert merely had a normal skin rash. After Dr Ames killed his uncle, Rupert believed himself cursed and shot himself. His note refers to the leprosy, which everyone assumed was a metaphorical reference, not a real condition. Bleibner and the American, respectively, were also killed by the doctor, using injections of bacterial cultures.

=== The Jewel Robbery at the Grand Metropolitan ===
While staying at the Grand Metropolitan Hotel in Brighton, Poirot and Hastings meet the wealthy Opalsen couple. Mrs Opalsen offers to show Poirot a pearl necklace, but discovers that it has been stolen when she goes to fetch it from her room.

Suspicion falls on Mrs Opalsen's personal maid, Célestine, and the hotel chambermaid assigned to clean the room. Célestine has orders to be present in the room whenever the chambermaid is there, but admits that she twice stepped out briefly to fetch items from her own adjoining room. Each woman blames the other for the theft, and the police search them both but find no trace of the necklace on either one. Poirot determines that during the time it took Célestine to leave and return, the thief could not have found Mrs Opalsen's jewelry box, unlocked it, taken the necklace, relocked the box, and returned it to its drawer. A necklace is found hidden in Célestine's bed, but Poirot spots it as a fake. He and Hastings examine an adjoining empty room and question a hotel valet who looks after Mr Opalsen's room, directly across the corridor from his wife's. Poirot presents a card for both the chambermaid and valet to examine, but neither admits to having seen it before.

Poirot abruptly returns to London, then reports to Hastings and the Opalsens the following evening that the case has been solved, the necklace recovered, and the thieves arrested. The chambermaid and valet had conspired to steal the necklace; once Célestine left the room, the chambermaid took the box from its drawer, which had been lubricated to minimize noise, and passed it to the valet waiting in the empty adjoining room. He unlocked the box, took the necklace, and later passed the box back to the chambermaid so she could return it to the drawer once Célestine left again. The card that Poirot had them handle was treated to yield good fingerprints, which he gave to Japp so the latter could confirm the pair's identities as known jewel thieves and make the arrest at the hotel.

=== The Kidnapped Prime Minister ===
During the First World War, Hastings calls on Poirot to discuss a recent assassination attempt targeting David MacAdam, the British Prime Minister. Two high-ranking government officials arrive with an urgent request for Poirot's assistance in locating MacAdam, who has been kidnapped while travelling to Versailles for a secret peace conference. Upon reaching Boulogne-sur-Mer in France, he had entered what he believed to be an official car waiting for him. Both this car and the real one that was supposed to pick him up were later found, with no injuries to either the driver of the former or MacAdam's secretary, Captain Daniels; however, MacAdam has not been seen since.

The earlier attempt on his life had occurred while he was being driven back to London from Windsor Castle, accompanied by Daniels and a police escort. His car suddenly turned off the main road and was accosted by a gang of masked men, who shot at MacAdam and grazed his cheek when he put his head out of the window. MacAdam stopped at a local cottage hospital to have the wound bandaged, then continued on his journey to France. The car was later found in an area known to be frequented by German agents, and its driver − a police officer named O'Murphy − had also gone missing. Poirot and Hastings accompany a squad of detectives to Boulogne, Poirot harbouring suspicions about both Daniels and O'Murphy. Once the group arrives in France, Poirot insists that they should check into a hotel instead of searching for MacAdam; after thinking for five hours, he announces that they must return to England in order to investigate the case properly.

Accompanied by Hastings and the detectives, Poirot enquires at several cottage hospitals to the west of London, then directs them to a house where the police bring out a woman and two men, one of whom he identifies as O'Murphy. He has the other man taken to an airport and put on a plane to France; only now does Hastings recognise him as an uninjured MacAdam. Daniels had orchestrated the kidnapping, incapacitating both MacAdam and O'Murphy, having two accomplices substitute themselves for the pair, and staging both the shooting and the Boulogne abduction. Poirot's check of the cottage hospitals had revealed that no patient had come in that day to have a facial wound treated. The house where MacAdam and O'Murphy were found belonged to the woman brought out with them, a wanted German spy in league with Daniels. MacAdam reaches Versailles in time for the conference and his remarks are well received by the audience.

=== The Disappearance of Mr Davenheim ===
Poirot, Hastings, and Japp discuss the disappearance of a banker, Mr Davenheim, from his country house three days earlier. Poirot claims that he can solve the case in one week without leaving his chair, as long as the relevant facts are brought to him, and accepts a five-pound wager from Japp to do so.

Davenheim had left the house on Saturday afternoon to post some letters. He left instructions that Mr Lowen, a visitor he was expecting, should be shown into the study to await his return. However, Davenheim never returned and no trace of him was found; the police were called on Sunday, and a safe hidden in his study was found broken open and emptied of its contents − cash, bonds, and jewels − on Monday. Lowen and Davenheim were known to be on bad terms with one another, and the police have Lowen under observation but have not arrested him.

Poirot takes interest in the fact that the property has a lake and boathouse, and also in a recent picture of Davenheim that shows him wearing long hair and a full beard and moustache. The next day, Japp brings word that the police have found Davenheim's clothes in the lake and arrested Lowen, based on a maid's statement that she saw him crossing the grounds toward the study on the day Davenheim vanished. Furthermore, a petty criminal named Billy Kellett has been arrested; he had picked up and pawned Davenheim's ring after a man threw it into a ditch, used the money to get drunk, and assaulted an officer. Poirot asks Japp to find out whether Davenheim and his wife sleep in separate bedrooms; upon learning that they have done so for six months, he declares the case solved and urges Japp to withdraw any money he has deposited at Davenheim's bank. Soon afterward, the bank's sudden collapse is reported in newspapers all over London and an astounded Japp pays the wager.

Davenheim had been systematically embezzling from the bank and converting some of the money into bonds and jewels for easier transport. Several months earlier, under the guise of going abroad on business, he created the identity of Kellett, changed his appearance, and committed a crime that earned him a three-month jail sentence. After being released, he had to wear a wig and false beard and sleep in a separate room from his wife to keep the deception hidden from her. He staged the safe break-in, fled with the contents before Lowen arrived in order to set him up, threw his usual clothes into the lake after changing at the boathouse, and got himself arrested as Kellett to avoid police scrutiny.

=== The Adventure of the Italian Nobleman ===
Poirot and Hastings are in their rooms with a neighbour, Dr Hawker, when the medical man's housekeeper arrives with the message that a client, Count Foscatini, has phoned for the doctor, crying out for help. Poirot, Hastings and Hawker rush to Foscatini's flat in Regent's Court. The lift attendant there is unaware of any problems. The attendant says that Graves, the Count's manservant, left half an hour earlier with no indication of anything wrong. The flat is locked but the manager of the building opens it for them. Inside, they find a table set for three people, with the meals finished. The Count is alone and dead – his head crushed in by a small marble statue. Poirot is interested in the remains on the table. He questions the kitchen staff at the top of the building. They describe the meal they served and the dirty plates passed up to them in the service elevator. Poirot seems especially interested in the fact that little of the side dish and none of the dessert were eaten, while the main course was consumed entirely. He also points out that after crying out for help on the phone, the dying man replaced the receiver.

The police arrive at the flat as Graves returns. He tells them the two dinner guests first visited Foscatini on the previous day. One was a man in his forties, Signor Ascanio, and a younger man. Graves said that he listened to their first conversation, and heard threats uttered; then the Count invited the two men to dinner the next evening. Graves says that the next night Foscatini unexpectedly gave him the night off after dinner, when the port had been served. Ascanio is quickly arrested, but Poirot states three points of interest: the coffee was very black, the side dish and dessert were relatively untouched, and the curtains were not drawn. The Italian ambassador provides an alibi for Ascanio, which leads to suspicions of a diplomatic cover-up, and Ascanio denies knowing Foscatini. Poirot invites Ascanio for a talk and forces him to admit that he did know that Foscatini was a blackmailer. Ascanio's morning appointment was to pay him the money he demanded from a person in Italy, the transaction being arranged through the embassy where Ascanio worked.

After Ascanio leaves, Poirot tells Hastings that Graves is the killer and explains his reasoning. Graves overheard the monetary transaction, and realised that Ascanio could not admit to the relationship with Foscatini hence enabling theft of the ill-gotten lucre.

Graves killed Foscatini when he was alone – there never were any dinner guests – then ordered dinner for three and ate as much of the food as he could; but after consuming the three main courses, he could eat only a little of the side dishes and none of the desserts. Coffee was served for three and presumably drunk, but Foscatini's brilliant white teeth show that he never drank such staining substances. Finally, the open curtains show that Graves left the flat before nightfall and not after, which would not have been the case if the account given by Graves were true. This theory is passed on to Japp, and when he investigates, Poirot is proven right.

=== The Case of the Missing Will ===
Poirot receives a visit from Miss Violet Marsh, whose Uncle Andrew has recently died. He had returned to England after making his fortune in Australia, and he vehemently opposed her efforts to pursue an education. Andrew's will stipulates that Violet may live in his house for one year, during which time she must "prove her wits" in order to inherit his estate; if she fails, it is to be donated to various charitable institutions. Poirot interprets the document as a challenge to find something that Andrew has hidden on the grounds – either a sum of money, or a second will naming Violet as heir.

Poirot and Hastings travel to the house and begin to search; Poirot notes that all the keys are neatly labelled except for the one to a roll-top desk, which is tagged with a dirty envelope. He questions Mr and Mrs Baker, Andrew's housekeepers, who state that they witnessed a will he had drawn up; however, he said that he had made a mistake and tore it up, then rewrote it with them as witnesses again. Andrew then left the house to settle some tradesmen's accounts. Poirot learns that Andrew had had a secret compartment built into the bricks of the fireplace, which proves to contain the burnt remnants of a will.

A defeated Poirot and Hastings begin the journey back to London, but Poirot abruptly insists that they leave their train and return to the house. Once there, he lights a fire in the fireplace, unfolds the envelope attached to the desk key, and warms it over the flames. It proves to be a second will written in invisible ink, dated after the one Violet was given and leaving Andrew's estate to her. Andrew had written two copies of the will Violet received, burnt and hidden one as a ruse, then written the one on the envelope with a tradesman and his wife as witnesses. Poirot comments that even though Violet did not find the will herself, her decision to ask for his help meant that she had outwitted Andrew in the end and thus deserved her inheritance.

== American version of book ==
The American edition of the book, published one year later, featured an additional three stories which did not appear in book form in the UK until 1974 with the publication of Poirot's Early Cases.

- The Chocolate Box
- The Veiled Lady
- The Lost Mine

== Literary significance and reception ==
The review in The Times Literary Supplement of 3 April 1924 began with a note of caution but then became more positive:

"When in the first of M. Poirot's adventures, we find a famous diamond that has been the eye of a god and a cryptic message that it will be taken from its possessor 'at the full of the moon' we are inclined to grow indignant on behalf of our dear old friend the moonstone. But we have no right to do so, for the story is quite original".

The review further described Poirot as "a thoroughly pleasant and entertaining person".

The New York Times Book Review chose to review the 1924 UK publication of the novel in its edition of 20 April that year, rather than wait for the 1925 Dodd, Mead publication. The unnamed reviewer liked the book but seemed to consider the stories somewhat clichéd and not totally original, making several comparisons to Sherlock Holmes. He began, "Agatha Christie's hero...is traditional almost to caricature, but his adventures are amusing and the problems which he unravels skilfully tangled in advance." He did admit that "it is to be feared that some of the evidence [Poirot] collects would fare badly in criminal courts" but concluded, "Miss Christie's new book, in a word, is for the lightest of reading. But its appeal is disarmingly modest, and it will please the large public which relishes stories of crime, but likes its crime served decorously."

The Observer of 30 March 1924 said,

"The short story is a sterner test of the 'detective' writer than the full-grown novel. With ample space almost any practised writer can pile complication upon complication, just as any man could make a puzzling maze out of a ten-acre field. But to pack mystery, surprise and a solution into three or four thousand words is to achieve a feat. There is no doubt about Miss Christie's success in the eleven tales (why not a round dozen?) published in this volume. All of them have point and ingenuity, and if M. Poirot is infallibly and exasperatingly omniscient, well, that is the function of the detective in fiction."

Unlike The New York Times, the reviewer favourably compared some of the stories to those of Sherlock Holmes and concluded,

"We hope that the partnership [of Poirot, Hastings and Japp] will last long and yield many more narratives as exciting as these. With The Mysterious Affair at Styles and this volume to her credit (to say nothing of others) Miss Christie must be reckoned in the first rank of the detective story writers."

The Scotsman of 19 April 1924 said,

"It might have been thought that the possibilities of the super-detective, for the purposes of fiction, had been almost exhausted. Miss Agatha Christie, however, has invested the type with a new vitality in her Hercule Poirot, and in Poirot Investigates she relates some more of his adventures. Poirot is most things that the conventional sleuth is not. He is gay, gallant, transparently vain, and the adroitness with which he solves a mystery has more of the manner of the prestidigitator than of the cold-blooded, relentless tracker-down of crime of most detective stories. He has a Gallic taste for the dramatic, and in The Tragedy of Marsdon Manor he perhaps gives it undue rein, but mainly the eleven stories in the book are agreeably free from the elaborate contrivance which is always rather a defect in such tales. Poirot is confronted with a problem and Miss Christie is always convincing in the manner in which she shows how he lights upon a clue and follows it up.

Robert Barnard remarked that this was one of her "Early stories, written very much under the shadow of Holmes and Watson." His critique was that "The tricks are rather repetitive and the problems lack variety".

== References in other works ==
The Prime Minister who features in the story The Kidnapped Prime Minister is also referenced in the 1923 short story The Submarine Plans, which was published in book form in the 1974 collection Poirot's Early Cases. It is possible that his name, "David MacAdam", is a Celtic wordplay on the name of the real Prime Minister during the latter days of the First World War, David Lloyd George.

In The Adventure of the Western Star, Lady Yardly was advised to visit Poirot by her friend Mary Cavendish, a long time friend of Hastings. Cavendish appears in The Mysterious Affair at Styles, Christie's first mystery novel, and the one which introduced Hercule Poirot to the literary world.

== Adaptations ==
=== TV play ===
The Disappearance of Mr Davenheim was presented on television as a thirty-minute play by CBS as an episode in the series General Electric Theater on 1 April 1962 under the title of Hercule Poirot. Introduced by Ronald Reagan and directed by John Brahm, the adaptation starred Martin Gabel as Poirot. The program was made as a pilot for a series that did not happen; instead it was the debut of the character on English-language television. (An earlier adaptation of the same story starring José Ferrer as Hercule Poirot had been filmed by MGM in 1961 but never aired, and in 1955, German television aired Murder on the Orient Express.)

=== British television series ===
All of the stories contained in Poirot Investigates have been adapted as episodes in the ITV television series Agatha Christie's Poirot with David Suchet in the role of Poirot, Hugh Fraser as Hastings, Philip Jackson as Japp and Pauline Moran as Miss Lemon. As is the custom with these adaptations, they differ somewhat from their originals.

The Kidnapped Prime Minister was partly filmed in Kent at Ingress Abbey in Greenhithe, St Margaret's Bay and Dover.

The adaptations (in order of transmission) were:

Series Two

- The Veiled Lady – 14 January 1990

The adaptation adds Miss Lemon to the story. Poirot is arrested as an attempted burglar while Hastings manages to escape, and later informs Japp about the incident who lets Poirot go. Gertie has an accomplice who pretended to be Lavington and Lavington's real name was Lavington indeed, not Reed as was in the short story.

- The Lost Mine – 21 January 1990

The adaptation adds Miss Lemon to the story and replaces inspector Miller by Chief Inspector Japp. Charles Lester has a wife who visits Poirot, unlike in the short story, the fact about his status is unknown. Pearson's plan is little changed from the story. In the adaptation he never sees Wu Ling, but in the story he saw him, but acted as he didn't. Poirot calls Pearson into the den, unlike in the short story where Pearson calls Poirot instead.

- The Disappearance of Mr Davenheim – 4 February 1990

The adaptation see Hastings play a large role, and, in a complete change from the short story, Poirot gets a parrot (leading to one of the famous exchanges: Delivery boy: "I've a parrot here for Mr Poy-rott." Poirot: "It is pronounced 'Pwa-roh'." Delivery boy: "Oh sorry. I've a Poirot here for a Mr Poy-rott.").

- The Adventure of the Cheap Flat – 18 February 1990

Miss Lemon is inserted into the story. Elsa Hardt is renamed to Carla Romero. Poirot sets a trap for an Italian assassin and later tricks him with giving him an empty gun which the assassin uses as a threat, unaware that the gun is empty. The Italian assassin is also arrested by Japp.

- The Kidnapped Prime Minister – 25 February 1990

Inspector Barnes is omitted from the adaptation while Miss Lemon is inserted instead of him. The year of the plot is changed from towards the end of First World War to the 1930s. Daniels' sister's name is changed from Bertha Ebenthal to Imogen Daniels and is not a German spy, but a fighter for Ireland's independence.

- The Adventure of the "Western Star" – 4 March 1990

The American Mary Marvel is changed to the Belgian Marie Marvelle. Chief Inspector Japp and Miss Lemon are put into the story. Rolf is arrested by Japp along with the man who tries to buy the diamond, rather than sent away by Poirot.

Series Three

- The Million Dollar Bond Robbery – 13 January 1991

Miss Lemon is inserted into the story. The character of Mr Vavasour appears in the episode, unlike in the short story, where he is only mentioned.

- The Tragedy at Marsdon Manor – 3 February 1991

Chief Inspector Japp is inserted into the story. Poirot gets a call from an amateur novelist for help with the plot of his new book and hears from him about Maltraver's death. Maltraver's wife stages an attempt on her life and blood on a mirror.

- The Mystery of Hunter's Lodge – 10 March 1991

The adaptation is slightly changed. Poirot and Hastings are guests of Roger Havering. Poirot doesn't want to investigate because of his illness. The pistol isn't found. Roger Havering refuses to give his alibi because he didn't want his wife to know where he was. Japp and Hastings want to search for Mrs Middleton, but Poirot explains to them that she does not exist.

Series Five

- The Adventure of the Egyptian Tomb – 17 January 1993

Miss Lemon is inserted into the story. Dr Ames does not kill himself with the cyanide, and instead he tries to escape, but is arrested.

- The Case of the Missing Will – 7 February 1993

The adaptation was heavily changed: the death of Andrew Marsh is changed into a murder. The "missing will" of the title was also changed: it is not a hidden will but an old document that is stolen from Marsh's papers after it is made clear that Marsh intends to write a new will leaving everything to Violet Wilson (as she is renamed in the adaptation). Andrew Marsh is an old friend of Poirot's and Poirot was already in Andrew's house when he died. Chief Inspector Japp and Miss Lemon are put into the adaptation.

- The Adventure of the Italian Nobleman – 14 February 1993

Miss Lemon is inserted into the adaptation, and is in a relationship with Foscatini's butler Graves, who is given the first name Edwin. Prior to the murder, Graves is invited to tea and tells Poirot that he is concerned about his employer being blackmailed. The unnamed inspector from the short story is replaced by Chief Inspector Japp. Ascanio's name is changed from Paolo to Mario, and he isn’t arrested. A new character of Mr Vizzini is added, along with a storyline about Hastings buying a new car from him. Graves tries to escape after the denouement.

- The Chocolate Box – 21 February 1993

Captain Hastings is removed from the story. Instead, a framing plot is added where Poirot and Chief Inspector Japp go to Belgium (with scenes shot in Brussels and Antwerp), in order for Japp to receive the prestigious Branche d'Or (Golden Branch) Award. When they meet with people who were involved in the case, Poirot begins to tell the story to Japp in flashback. The American character is replaced with a Belgian neighbor, and most of the French characters in the story are made Belgian. The death of Deroulard's wife is shown in flashback at the beginning of the episode. Virginie Mesnard, instead of being in love with Deroulard, has a somewhat innocent flirtation with Poirot, and is revealed to have given him the silver lapel pin that David Suchet wore throughout the series. The character of Poirot's friend Chantalier is added to the adaptation, and Virginie is revealed in the present to have married him and had two sons. The flashback year is changed from 1893 to 1914.

- The Jewel Robbery at the Grand Metropolitan – 7 March 1993

Miss Lemon and Chief Inspector Japp are inserted into the episode (in the original story, Japp is only mentioned). An elaborate storyline is added, making Mr. Opalsen a theater producer with his wife as his leading lady, and the pearls a famous necklace given to a silent film actress by a tsar, which the Opalsens have acquired to drum up publicity for their new play. Two new characters are added: a playwright, who is also Celestine's boyfriend, and a mysterious "Mr. Worthing" who turns out to be the Opalsens' driver Saunders in disguise (he is Grace's husband and accomplice, and replaces the valet in the story). Celestine is English rather than French (although they go out of their way to have Poirot note that she has a French name). The jewels were due to be smuggled out of the country hidden among the props for the play, which is about to begin a run in New York. Poirot's gaff with the "specially treated fingerprint card" is removed. A strange subplot is also added, where Poirot is being continuously recognized as a newspaper advertisement figure and hounded by readers trying to claim a prize.

=== Japanese anime ===
Five of the stories were adapted as anime episodes of the Japanese television series Agatha Christie's Great Detectives Poirot and Marple. These were as follows:

- The Jewel Robbery at the Grand Metropolitan – 4 July 2004
- The Adventure of the Cheap Flat – 18 July 2004
- The Kidnapped Prime Minister – 5–12 September 2004
- The Adventure of the Egyptian Tomb – 19–26 September 2004
- The Disappearance of Mr Davenheim – 17 April 2005

=== Stage adaptation ===
The Adventure of the Western Star was adapted by Stuart Landon into a "Mel Brooks-eque" comedic play titled Poirot Investigates! and performed at Open Stage, a regional theater in Harrisburg, Pennsylvania. The show premiered virtually on 6 November 2020 in the midst of the COVID-19 pandemic. Subsequent productions for in-person audiences premiered in April 2021 and May 2023, receiving generally positive reviews from critics.

== Publication history ==
- 1924, John Lane (The Bodley Head), March 1924, Hardcover, 310 pp
- 1925, Dodd Mead and Company (New York), 1925, Hardcover, 282 pp
- 1928, John Lane (The Bodley Head), March 1928, Hardcover (Cheap edition – two shillings)
- 1931, John Lane (The Bodley Head, February 1931), As part of the An Agatha Christie Omnibus along with The Mysterious Affair at Styles and The Murder on the Links, Hardback (Priced at seven shillings and sixpence; a cheaper edition at five shillings was published in October 1932)
- 1943, Dodd Mead and Company, As part of the Triple Threat along with Partners in Crime and The Mysterious Mr Quin), Hardback
- 1955, Pan Books, Paperback (Pan number 326) 192 pp
- 1956, Avon Books (New York), Avon number 716, Paperback
- 1958, Pan Books, Paperback (Great Pan G139)
- 1961, Bantam Books, Paperback, 198 pp
- 1989, Fontana Books (Imprint of HarperCollins), Paperback, 192 pp
- 2007, Facsimile of 1924 UK first edition (HarperCollins), 5 November 2007, Hardcover, 326 pp ISBN 0-00-726520-4

Chapters from the book appeared in Agatha Christie's Crime Reader, published by Cleveland Publishing in 1944 along with other selections from Partners in Crime and The Mysterious Mr Quin.

=== First publication of stories ===
All of the stories were first published, unillustrated, in the UK in The Sketch magazine. Christie wrote them following a suggestion from its editor, Bruce Ingram, who had been impressed with the character of Poirot in The Mysterious Affair at Styles. The stories first appeared in The Sketch as follows:

- The Jewel Robbery at the Grand Metropolitan – 14 March 1923, Issue 1572 (under the title The Curious Disappearance of the Opalsen Pearls)
- The Disappearance of Mr Davenheim – 28 March 1923, Issue 1574
- The Adventure of "The Western Star" – 11 April 1923, Issue 1576
- The Tragedy at Marsdon Manor – 18 April 1923, Issue 1577
- The Kidnapped Prime Minister – 25 April 1923, Issue 1578
- The Million Dollar Bond Robbery – 2 May 1923, Issue 1579
- The Adventure of the Cheap Flat – 9 May 1923, Issue 1580
- The Mystery of Hunter's Lodge – 16 May 1923, Issue 1581
- The Adventure of the Egyptian Tomb – 26 September 1923, Issue 1600
- The Adventure of the Italian Nobleman – 24 October 1923, Issue 1604
- The Case of the Missing Will – 31 October 1923, Issue 1605

In the US, all of the stories first appeared in the monthly Blue Book Magazine. Each story carried a small, uncredited illustration. The publication order was as follows:

- The Jewel Robbery at the Grand Metropolitan – October 1923, Volume 37, Number 6 (under the title Mrs Opalsen's Pearls)
- The Disappearance of Mr Davenheim – December 1923, Volume 38, Number 2 (under the title Mr Davenby Disappears – the character's name was changed throughout this original magazine publication)
- The Adventure of The Western Star – February 1924, Volume 38, Number 4 (under the title The Western Star)
- The Tragedy at Marsdon Manor – March 1924, Volume 38, Number 5 (under the title The Marsdon Manor Tragedy)
- The Million Dollar Bond Robbery – April 1924, Volume 38, Number 6 (under the title The Great Bond Robbery)
- The Adventure of the Cheap Flat – May 1924, Volume 39, Number 1
- The Mystery of Hunter's Lodge – June 1924, Volume 39, Number 2 (under the title The Hunter's Lodge Case)
- The Kidnapped Prime Minister – July 1924, Volume 39, Number 3 (under the title The Kidnapped Premier – although the title "Prime Minister" was used within the text of the story)
- The Adventure of the Egyptian Tomb – August 1924, Volume 39, Number 4 (under the title The Egyptian Adventure)
- The Adventure of the Italian Nobleman – December 1924, Volume 40, Number 2 (under the title The Italian Nobleman)
- The Case of the Missing Will – January 1925, Volume 40, Number 3 (under the title The Missing Will)
- The Chocolate Box – February 1925, Volume 40, Number 4
- The Veiled Lady – March 1925, Volume 40, Number 5
- The Lost Mine – April 1925, Volume 40, Number 6

=== Publication of book collection ===
The preparation of the book marked a further downturn in the relationship between Christie and the Bodley Head. She had become aware that the six-book contract she had signed with John Lane had been unfair to her in its terms. At first she meekly accepted Lane's strictures about what would be published by them, but by the time of Poirot Investigates Christie insisted that their suggested title of The Grey Cells of Monsieur Poirot was not to her liking and that the book was to be included in the tally of six books within her contract. The Bodley Head opposed this because the stories had already been printed in The Sketch. Christie held out and won her case.

=== Book dedication ===
This was the first Christie book to carry no dedication.

=== Dustjacket blurb ===
The dustjacket front flap of the first edition carried no specially written blurb. Instead it carried quotes from reviews for In the Mayor's Parlour by J. S. Fletcher, whilst the back flap carried the same for The Perilous Transactions of Mr Collin by Frank Heller.
