= Bigmama's =

1991 children's book by Donald Crews

Bigmama's is a story written and illustrated by Donald Crews, published by Greenwillow Books in 1991. It is a story inspired by his own life, capturing what the summers of his childhood were like visiting his grandparents in the south. Through the illustrations, Crews shows the characters existing as children, happy and care-free enjoying summer, while including subtle details of the time period the story takes place in.

Bigmama's has been featured on recommended book lists and websites for teachers that include resources such as suggested lesson plans for how to guide discussion and activities in the classroom using this story.

== Background ==
Donald Crews was born in Newark, New Jersey and spent his summers visiting his grandparents in Cottondale, Florida. The idea for Bigmama’s came from Crews reminiscing with his family and telling stories to his nieces and nephews. The idea to begin illustrating some of these memories was a way to clarify details of the stories the younger family members were curious about – to show unfamiliar things such as the outhouse or the barn – to give them an idea of what summers were like back then. Also, at the time Crews wrote Bigmama's, and even in an interview a few years later, he acknowledge that there weren't "many books about Black families and their lives." Thus, in addition to writing Bigmama's as a way to share stories with his own family, Crews felt some responsibility to contribute this type of book to the field of children's literature. The completed book was published by Greenwillow Books in 1991.

== Plot ==
The book opens with the children arriving on the train to Cottondale where they visit their grandparents each summer. Their uncle – uncle Slank – picks the family up from the train and takes them to the house where "Bigmama" and "Bigpapa" are already on the porch awaiting their arrival. They called their grandma "Bigmama" because she was their "Mama's Mama". Once they've said hello, the children free themselves of their shoes and socks and begin their tour of the property, checking to make sure everything is as they remembered it. They check inside the house and then move onto the backyard, listing with excitement everything they see just as it is each summer. The children dip a bucket of water into the well for a drink and visit the chicken coop, venture farther to see the outhouse and the water pump, and then look for nests with eggs in them and worms to use for fishing.

== Genre and style ==
Bigmama’s is an autobiographical story of Donald Crews' experiences visiting his family in the summers in Cottondale, Florida. It is a work of realistic fiction depicting situations many children can relate to, focusing on play and the importance of family. The style of Bigmama’s is more realistic than some of Crews’ other notable works and his attention to detail specific to the context and setting of his story, illustrating specifics of African American family life during this time period, serve to set it apart from other children's books about visiting grandparents or farm life that typically have focused on White families and characters.

== Analysis ==
Close attention to detail is important in Crews’ books, and Bigmama’s is no different. Toward the beginning of the book when the family is on the train arriving to Cottondale, there is a sign that says “Colored,” which is the only hint to the social context and time of segregation the story takes place in. It is Crews’ way of addressing this without making it a central plot point. The book’s subtle details allow space for teachers and parents to address historical social issues with young children, such as segregation, but it is not necessary to do so in order to use the book, as it's not central to the plot of the story.

Crucial to this book are the concepts of family and family values, togetherness, and the importance of connection with culture and "ancestry". Bigmama’s is a story that is both relatable to children through use of themes such as family, while also specifically addressing African American culture. An aspect of the book that has been highlighted is that the children are shown experiencing unsupervised adventure and exploration but still near the loving and watchful eyes of family.

== Reception and scholarly commentaries ==
South Dakota Public Broadcasting included Bigmama's on their list of recommended "Black History Month Books for Kids," and references the context of segregation in the book's time period not taking away from the celebratory and "carefree" nature of the story. It was also included on the Teaching Books website on reading lists as well as alongside resources for teachers to create lesson plans and bring this book into classroom discussions.

A review of Bigmama's in Horn Book Magazine highlighted the love and nostalgia of Crews' childhood represented in the book and the depiction of the "joyous time" where family comes together.

A review from The Skanner underscores the themes of family, adventure, and curiosity that the book portrays, as well as the appreciation for the simple things in life. The review also addresses how important this book is both for children who can relate to the experience of visiting family in the countryside, like the characters in the book did, as well as bringing in a perspective of a different kind of life for those children who maybe haven't had the chance to spend time outside of a big city.
