= Freight Train (book) =

Book by Donald Crews

- Author: Donald Crews
- Publisher: Greenwillow Books
- Pages: 24

Freight Train is a 24-page children's picture book written and illustrated by Donald Crews and published by Greenwillow Books in 1978. It lacks any story, but rather describes the inner workings of a large cargo train. It was named one of 1979's Caldecott Honor books. It has been included in such lists of top children's books as Anita Silvey's 100 Best Books for Children and a 2012 "Top Children's Picture Books" list by School Library Journal. In a retrospective essay about the Caldecott Medal-winning books from 1976 to 1985, Barbara Bader described Freight Train as "a stellar example of the simple, assured work for younger children–conceptually interesting and visually exciting–that hasn't been taking top prize."

== Derivative works ==
The popularity of this book led it to be completely remade in 2001 by Crews. The new edition, titled Inside Freight Train, features fold-out panels, revealing the insides of the various train carriages. The book has also been developed into a 2011 mobile app.
