= Donald Crews =

American illustrator and writer (born 1938)

- Born: August 30, 1938 (age 87) Newark, New Jersey
- Occupation: Children's book author, graphic designer
- Education: Cooper Union
- Notable works: Freight Train, Bigmama's
- Notable awards: Children's Literature Legacy Award (2015)
- Spouse: Ann Jonas (m. 1963; died 2013)
- Children: 2, including Nina Crews

Donald Crews (born August 30, 1938) is an American illustrator and writer of children's picture books. In 2015, the American Library Association (ALA) honored him with the Children's Literature Legacy Award, recognizing his lasting contribution to children's literature.

His works Freight Train (1978) and Truck (1980) were Caldecott Honor recipients.

== Early life ==
Donald Crews was born in Newark, New Jersey in 1938. His mother worked as a seamstress, and his father worked at the railroad and several other odd jobs. Raised in Newark, Crews spent summers at his grandparents' home in rural Cottondale, Florida, with his mother and three siblings. These summers were inspiration for the autobiographical books Bigmama's (1991) and Shortcut (1992).

Encouraged by a high school teacher, Crews pursued art as a career. He attended Cooper Union in New York City and graduated in 1959. While at Cooper Union, Crews met his future wife, graphic artist Ann Jonas.

== Career ==
Crews was drafted into the U.S. Army in 1963, and sent to Frankfurt, Germany. While in Germany, he designed a children's alphabet book to include in his portfolio. After multiple rejections, the book was published as We Read: A to Z by Harper & Row (now HarperCollins) in 1967. Crews' second children's book, Ten Black Dots, was published the following year. In addition to children's books, he continued working as a freelance graphic designer and illustrator.

A recurring motif in Crews' work is transportation, seen in books Freight Train (1978), Truck (1980), Harbor (1982), School Bus (1984), and Flying (1986). Freight Train and Truck were both awarded Caldecott Honors. These works use minimal text, focusing primarily on visuals, and rarely feature people. On this style, Crews said:

Freight Train was close to the time when I was doing most of my work as a designer, and abstraction and brevity and symbol were more important to me, were more significant to the way I did my work.

In the 1990s, Crews began to create more personal works. Autobiographical books Bigmama's (1991) and Shortcut (1992) reflect on childhood summers with his grandparents, "Bigmama" and "Bigpapa", in Florida. Crews said that Bigmama's originated "from telling the story to [his] nieces and nephews and discussing it with [his] siblings and [his] parents".

[T]he young people wanted to know more about what it looked like– what we meant by an outhouse, and the barn and the big house. We had few photographs of that experience. And I thought of it [Bigmama's] more in terms of a way of clarifying the stories that we told all the time.

An additional motivation for Crews' autobiographical stories is "the fact that there aren't very many books about Black families and their lives".

== Personal life ==
Crews and Ann Jonas were married in Germany in 1963, and had two daughters. Their first daughter, Nina, was born in Germany, and their second daughter, Amy, was born in New York. Nina is also an award-winning children's book author.

The couple lived in New York City until 1996, when they relocated to a restored farmhouse in the Hudson River Valley. Jonas died in September 2013.

== Selected works ==
- We Read: A to Z (1967)
- Ten Black Dots (1968)
- Freight Train (1978) – Caldecott Honor Book
- Truck (1980) - Caldecott Honor Book
- Light (1981)
- Carousel (1982)
- Harbor (1982)
- Parade (1983)
- School Bus (1984)
- Bicycle Race (1985)
- Flying (1986)
- Bigmama's (1991)
- Shortcut (1992)
- Sail Away (1995)
- Night at the Fair (1998)
- Cloudy Day Sunny Day (1999)
- Inside Freight Train (2001)

As illustrator only

- Rain (written by Robert Kalan) (1978)
- Blue Sea (written by Robert Kalan) (1979)
- How Many Snails (written by Paul Giganti Jr.) (1988)
- Each Orange Had 8 Slices (written by Paul Giganti Jr.) (1992)
- Tomorrow's Alphabet (written by George Shannon) (1996)
- More Than One (written by Miriam Schlein) (1996)
- This Is the Sunflower (written by Lola M. Schaefer) (2000)
