= The Murder on the Links =

1923 mystery novel by Agatha Christie

- Dust-jacket illustration of the US true first edition.
- Author: Agatha Christie
- Language: English
- Series: Hercule Poirot
- Genre: Crime novel
- Publisher: The Bodley Head
- Publication date: 1923
- Publication place: United Kingdom
- Media type: Print (hardcover & paperback)
- Pages: 298 (first edition hardcover)
- Preceded by: The Mysterious Affair at Styles
- Followed by: Poirot Investigates (short stories)
- Text: The Murder on the Links at Wikisource

The Murder on the Links is a mystery novel by the English writer Agatha Christie, first published in the US by Dodd, Mead & Co in March 1923, and in the UK by The Bodley Head in May of the same year. It is the second novel featuring Hercule Poirot and Arthur Hastings. The UK edition retailed at seven shillings and sixpence (7/6), and the US edition at $1.75.

The story takes place in northern France, giving Poirot a hostile competitor from the Paris Sûreté. Poirot's long memory for past or similar crimes proves useful in resolving the crimes. The book is notable for a subplot in which Hastings falls in love, a development "greatly desired on Agatha's part... parcelling off Hastings to wedded bliss in the Argentine."

Reviews when it was published compared Mrs Christie favourably to Arthur Conan Doyle in his Sherlock Holmes mysteries. Remarking on Poirot, still a new character, one reviewer said he was "a pleasant contrast to most of his lurid competitors; and one even suspects a touch of satire in him."

== Plot summary ==
Hercule Poirot and Captain Hastings travel to Merlinville-sur-Mer, France, to meet Paul Renauld, who has requested their help. When they arrive, local police greet them with the news that Renauld was found dead that morning, stabbed in the back with a knife and left in a newly dug grave adjacent to a local golf course. His wife, Eloise Renauld, claims masked men broke into the villa at 2 am, tied her up, and took her husband away with them. Upon inspecting his body, Eloise collapses with grief at seeing her dead husband. Monsieur Giraud of the Sûreté leads the police investigation, and resents Poirot's involvement.

Poirot notes four key facts about the case: a piece of lead piping is found near the body; only three female servants were in the villa as both Renauld's son Jack and his chauffeur had been sent away; an unknown person visited the day before; and Renauld's immediate neighbour, Madame Daubreuil, had placed 200,000 francs into her bank account over recent weeks.

When Renauld's secretary, Gabriel Stonor, returns from England, he suggests blackmail, as his employer's past is a complete mystery prior to his career in South America. Meanwhile, Hastings unexpectedly encounters a young woman he had met on the train, known only as "Cinderella." She asks to see the crime scene and then disappears with the murder weapon.

Poirot discovers that the case is nearly identical to one from 22 years ago, in which a man called Georges Conneau and his lover, Madame Beroldy, conspired to kill Madame Beroldy's husband. Poirot travels to Paris to discover more about the Conneau murder. He finds a photograph of Madame Beroldy that shows that she is really Madame Daubreuil. On returning, Poirot learns that the body of a tramp has been found, stabbed through the heart with the murder weapon. An examination shows that he died before Renauld's murder from an epileptic seizure and was stabbed later.

Giraud arrests Jack on the basis that he wanted his father's money. Poirot reveals Renauld changed his will two weeks before his murder, disinheriting Jack. Jack is released from prison after Bella Duveen, an English stage performer he loves, confesses to the murder. Both had come across the body on the night of the murder, and each assumed the other had killed Renauld. Poirot reveals neither did, as the real killer was Marthe Daubreuil, daughter of the neighbour.

Poirot elaborates on his theory: Paul Renauld was really Georges Conneau, who returned to France after fleeing years ago. By misfortune, he found that his immediate neighbour would be Madame Beroldy, his old lover; like him, she had changed her identity, becoming Mme. Daubreuil. Blackmailed by her over his past, Renauld found his situation worsened when Jack becomes attracted to her daughter. When a tramp died on his grounds, he saw an opportunity to stage his own death and escape Mme Daubreuil. He would disfigure the tramp's face with the pipe, and then bury the tramp and the pipe beside the golf course, before fleeing the area by train. Anyone who would recognise that the body was not his would be sent away. However, the plan was discovered by Marthe, who followed Renauld and stabbed him after he dug the grave for the tramp's body. Her motive is money; Jack will inherit his father's fortune on his mother's death. To expose Marthe as the killer, Poirot asked Mme Renauld to openly state she will disinherit Jack. Marthe attempts to kill Mme Renauld in her villa but dies in a struggle with Hastings's Cinderella.

Marthe's mother disappears again. Jack and his mother plan to go to South America, joined by Hastings and his Cinderella, who is revealed as Bella Duveen's twin sister Dulcie.

== Characters ==
- Hercule Poirot – The famous Belgian detective called in by the man who would be murdered.
- Captain Arthur Hastings – Poirot's assistant on the case, accompanying him at his request, and the narrator of the story.
- Monsieur Giraud – Detective of the Paris Sûreté and the investigating officer. Considers Poirot to be his rival and resents his involvement in the investigation.
- Monsieur Hautet – Examining Magistrate, and Giraud's assistant. More respectful of Poirot's reputation, and thus more helpful to the Belgian detective.
- Paul Renauld/Georges Conneau – The victim of the case. Requested Poirot's assistance for an unknown matter, prior to his murder. Involved in the Beroldy murder 22 years ago, in which he was the killer, but escaped justice when caught.
- Eloise Renauld – Renauld's wife, whom he met in South America. Helped her husband fake his kidnapping on the night of his death; initially suspected of the murder by Poirot, until Eloise sees her husband's body.
- Jack Renauld – Renauld's son, born in South America, and raised both there and in France. Mistakenly suspected of murder by Giraud, due to an argument between him and his father. Formerly in love with Marthe, now in love with Bella.
- Madame Daubreuil/Madame Jeanne Beroldy – Renauld's neighbour and blackmailer. Involved in plotting the murder of her husband 22 years ago, but escaped justice when exposed.
- Marthe Daubreuil – Madame Daubreuil's daughter, who wants to marry Jack, unaware he is in love with another woman.
- Gabriel Stonor – Renauld's secretary. Absent at the time of the murder, and has no knowledge of his employer's past.
- Bella Duveen – A stage performer, with whom Jack is in love, twin of Dulcie Duveen.
- Dulcie Duveen – A stage performer and Bella's twin sister. She tells Hastings her name is "Cinderella", and she becomes his love interest.
- Lucien Bex – Commissary of Police for Merlinville.
- Monsieur Marchaud – Police sergeant in Merlinville's police.
- Dr Durand – Local doctor and police surgeon in Merlinville.
- Françoise Arrichet – An elderly servant of the Renaulds' household, one of three servants present at the Renaulds' house during the crime.
- Léonie Oulard – A young maid of the Renaulds' household, one of three servants present at the Renaulds' house during the crime.
- Denise Oulard – A maid of the Renaulds' household and Léonie's sister, and one of three servants present at the Renaulds' house during the crime.
- Auguste – The Renaulds' gardener. Absent from the house on the night of the murder.
- Joseph Aarons – A British theatrical agent.

== Literary significance and reception ==
The Times Literary Supplement reviewed the novel in its issue of 7 June 1923. The review compared the methods of detection of Poirot to Sherlock Holmes and concluded favourably that the book "provides the reader with an enthralling mystery of an unusual kind".

The New York Times Book Review of 25 March 1923 began, "Here is a remarkably good detective story which can be warmly commended to those who like that kind of fiction." After detailing the set-up of the story the review continued, "The plot has peculiar complications and the reader will have to be very astute indeed if he guesses who the criminal is until the last complexity has been unravelled. The author is notably ingenious in the construction and unravelling of the mystery, which develops fresh interests and new entanglements at every turn. She deserves commendation also for the care with which the story is worked out and the good craftsmanship with which it is written. Although there is not much endeavour to portray character, except in the case of M. Poirot, several of the personages are depicted with swiftly made expressive and distinctive lines."

The unnamed reviewer in The Observer of 10 June 1923 said, "When Conan Doyle popularised Sherlock Holmes in the Strand of the 'nineties he lit such a candle as the publishers will not willingly let out. Not a week passes which does not bring a 'detective' story from one quarter or another, and several of the popular magazines rely mainly on that commodity. Among the later cultivators of this anything but lonely furrow the name of Agatha Christie is well in the front. If she has not the touch of artistry which made The Speckled Band and The Hound of the Baskervilles things of real horror, she has an unusual gift of mechanical complication." The reviewer went on to compare the novel with The Mysterious Affair at Styles, which they called "a remarkable piece of work", but warned that "it is a mistake to carry the art of bewilderment to the point of making the brain reel". They did admit that "[n]o solution could be more surprising" and stated that the character of Poirot was "a pleasant contrast to most of his lurid competitors; and one even suspects a touch of satire in him."

Robert Barnard: "Super-complicated early whodunit, set in the northerly fringes of France so beloved of the English bankrupt. Poirot pits his wits against a sneering sophisticate of a French policeman while Hastings lets his wander after an auburn-haired female acrobat. Entertaining for most of its length, but the solution is one of those 'once revealed, instantly forgotten' ones, where ingenuity has triumphed over common sense".

In a modern work of literary criticism, Christie biographer Laura Thompson writes:

Murder on the Links was as different from its predecessor as that had been from Styles. It is very French; not just in setting but in tone, which reeks of Gaston Leroux and, at times, Racine… Agatha admitted that she had written it in a "high-flown, fanciful" manner. She had also based the book too closely upon a real-life French murder case, which gives the story a kind of non-artistic complexity.

[…]

But Poirot is magnificently himself. What originality there is in Murder on the Links comes straight from his thought processes. For example he deduces the modus operandi of the crime because it is a repeat, essentially, of an earlier murder; this proves his favourite theory that human nature does not change, even when the human in question is a killer: "The English murderer who disposed of his wives in succession by drowning them in their baths was a case in point. Had he varied his methods, he might have escaped detection to this day. But he obeyed the common dictates of human nature, arguing that what had once succeeded would succeed again, and he paid the penalty of his lack of originality."

She notes as well that the book, the second novel featuring Poirot, is notable for a subplot in which Hastings falls in love, a development "greatly desired on Agatha's part... parcelling off Hastings to wedded bliss in the Argentine."

== Publication history ==
Dustjacket illustration of the first British edition.

- 1923, Dodd Mead and Company (New York), March 1923, hardcover, 298 pp
- 1923, John Lane (The Bodley Head), May 1923, hardcover, 326 pp
- 1928, John Lane (The Bodley Head), March 1928, hardcover (cheap ed. – 2 s.)
- 1931, John Lane (The Bodley Head, February 1931 (as part of the An Agatha Christie Omnibus along with The Mysterious Affair at Styles and Poirot Investigates, hardcover (priced at 7 s. 6 d., a cheaper edition at 5 s. was published in October 1932).
- 1932, John Lane (The Bodley Head), March 1932, paperback (6 d.)
- 1936, Penguin Books, March 1936, paperback (6 d.) 254 pp
- 1949, Dell Books, 1949, Dell number 454, paperback, 224 pp
- 1954, Corgi Books, 1954, paperback, 222 pp
- 1960, Pan Books, 1960, Paperback (Great Pan G323), 224 pp
- 1977, Ulverscroft large-print, 1977, hardcover, 349 pp; ISBN 0-85456-516-7
- 1978, Panther Books, 1978, paperback, 224 pp
- 1988, Fontana Books (Imprint of HarperCollins), paperback, 208 pp; ISBN 0-00-617477-9
- 2007, Facsimile of 1923 UK first edition (HarperCollins), 5 November 2007, hardcover, 326 pp; ISBN 0-00-726516-6

The novel received its first true publication as a four-part serialisation in the Grand Magazine from December 1922 to March 1923 (Issues 214–217) under the title of "The Girl with the Anxious Eyes" before it was issued in book form by The Bodley Head in May 1923. This was Christie's first published work for the Grand Magazine which went on to publish many of her short stories throughout the 1920s.

Christie's Autobiography recounts how she objected to the illustration of the dustjacket of the UK first edition stating that it was both badly drawn and unrepresentative of the plot. It was the first of many such objections she raised with her publishers over the dustjacket. It would appear that Christie won her argument over the dustjacket as the one she describes and objected to ("a man in his pyjamas, dying of an epileptic fit on a golf course") does not resemble the actual jacket which shows Monsieur Renauld digging the open grave on the golf course at night.

=== Book dedication ===
Christie dedicated her third book as follows:

"To My Husband. A fellow enthusiast for detective stories and to whom I am indebted for much helpful advice and criticism".

Christie refers here to her first husband, Archibald Christie (1889–1962) from whom she was divorced in 1928.

=== Dustjacket blurb ===
The dustjacket front flap of the first edition carried no specially written blurb. Instead it carried quotes of reviews for The Mysterious Affair at Styles whilst the back jacket flap carried similar quotes for The Secret Adversary.

== Adaptations ==
=== Theatre ===
The Murder on the Links was adapted for the stage by American playwright Steven Dietz in 2021. Performed by an ensemble cast of six, with Poirot and Hastings played by either male or female actors, this serio-comic adaptation is scheduled to premiere in San Diego (North Coast Repertory Theatre) and at the Laguna Playhouse in 2023.

A separate adaptation debuted at Two River Theater in September of 2025. This version, written and directed by Darko Tresnjak, removed several characters and changed the denouement. In this version of the story, Jack and Marthe are half-siblings from Conneau and Madame Beroldy's affair. Jack kills Marthe as revenge for killing his father and is executed for her murder.

=== Radio ===
The Murder on the Links was presented as a one-hour, thirty-minute radio adaptation in the Saturday Night Theatre strand on BBC Radio 4 on 15 September 1990, the centenary of Christie's birth. It was repeated on 8 July 1991 and again in 2015. John Moffatt starred as Poirot. The play's recording took place on 21 June 1989 at Broadcasting House. It was adapted by Michael Bakewell and produced and directed by Enyd Williams.

Cast:

- John Moffatt as Hercule Poirot
- Jeremy Clyde as Captain Hastings
- Madeline Smith as Dulcee Duveen
- Vincent Brimble as Inspector Giraud
- Geoffrey Whitehead as Inspector Bex
- Joan Matheson as Madame Renauld
- Stephen Tompkinson as Jack Renauld
- David King as Judge Hautet
- Petra Davies as Madame Daubreuil
- Francesca Buller as Marthe Daubreuil
- Barbara Atkinson as Françoise
- Joanna Mackie as Léoine
- Danny Schiller as Hotel Receptionist
- Ken Cumberlidge as Sergeant of Police
- Brian Miller as the Doctor

=== Television ===
==== British adaptation ====
An adaptation of the novel was made for the series Agatha Christie's Poirot on 11 February 1996. It was produced by Carnival Films, and starred David Suchet as Hercule Poirot, and Hugh Fraser as Arthur Hastings. While much of the novel's plot was retained, the adaptation featured a number of changes, which included the setting being changed to Deauville, France, where filming took place on-site. The wager between Poirot and Giraud is changed; instead of 500 Francs, the stakes are Giraud's famous pipe against Poirot's moustache. In the end, Poirot returns the pipe, observing that Giraud will think of him whenever he uses it. Jack is Paul's stepson who was adopted by him and took his last name, instead of being his biological son. The denouement is different. Bella is a singer, who introduces herself to Hastings as “Isabelle”. She still confuses things by confessing to the crime, but she no longer loves Jack. It is Stonor who shoots Marthe with her own gun when—as Poirot predicts—she breaks in and tries to kill Madame Renaud. Marthe's mother does not escape, but is arrested. There is no twin sister. Bella is now in love with Hastings, who is staying in Deauville to make sense of it all. Poirot brings her to join Hastings on the promenade on the seaside, where they share a long kiss.

Adaptor: Anthony Horowitz
Director: Andrew Grieve

Cast:

- David Suchet as Hercule Poirot
- Hugh Fraser as Arthur Hastings
- Bill Moody as Giraud
- Damien Thomas as Paul Renauld
- Sophie Linfield as Marthe Daubreuil
- Kate Fahy as Bernadette Daubreuil
- Jacinta Mulcahy as Bella Duveen
- Bernard Latham as Lucien Bex
- Ben Pullen as Jack Renauld
- Diane Fletcher as Eloise Renauld
- Terence Beesley as Stonor
- Andrew Melville as Dr Hautet
- Henrietta Voigts as Leonie
- James Vaughan as Adam Letts
- Ray Gatenby as a Station Master
- Randal Herley as the Judge
- Belinda Stewart-Wilson as a Dubbing Secretary

==== Japanese adaptation ====
The second night of Meitantei Akafuji Takashi (a two-night release in December 2005) was an adaptation of The Murder on the Links. The first night had adapted The A.B.C. Murders. The show starred Shirō Itō as Takashi Akafuji, who represents the character of Poirot.

==== French adaptation ====
The seventh episode of the second season of the French television series Les Petits Meurtres d'Agatha Christie was an adaptation of this novel. It aired in 2014.

=== Graphic novel ===
The Murder on the Links was released by HarperCollins as a graphic novel adaptation on 16 July 2007, adapted by François Rivière and illustrated by Marc Piskic (ISBN 0-00-725057-6). This was translated from the edition first published in France by Emmanuel Proust éditions in 2003, and then translated to English, published by HarperCollins in 2007.
