= The Mysterious Affair at Styles =

1920 mystery novel by Agatha Christie

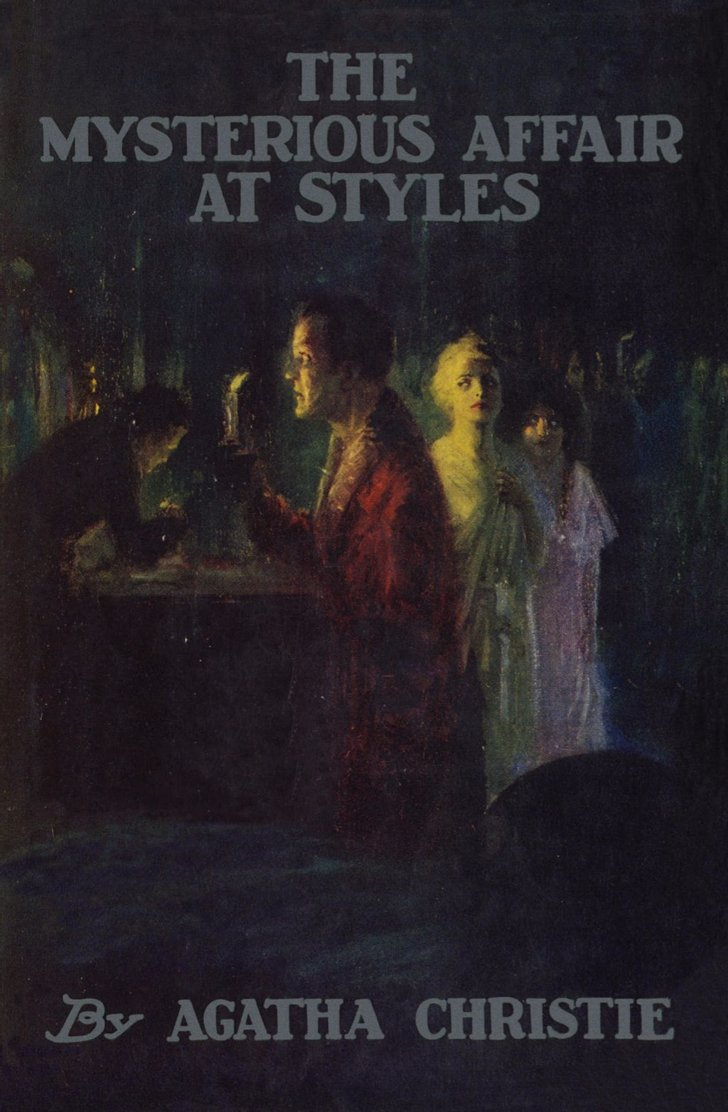
- Dustjacket illustration of the first edition in both the UK and the US
- Author: Agatha Christie
- Cover artist: Alfred James Dewey
- Language: English
- Series: Hercule Poirot
- Genre: Crime novel
- Publisher: John Lane
- Publication date: October 1920
- Publication place: United Kingdom
- Media type: Print (hardback & paperback)
- Pages: 296 (first edition, hardback)
- Followed by: The Murder on the Links
- Text: The Mysterious Affair at Styles at Wikisource

The Mysterious Affair at Styles is the first mystery novel by British writer Agatha Christie, introducing her fictional detective Hercule Poirot. It was written in the middle of the First World War, in 1916, and first published by John Lane in the United States in October 1920 and in the United Kingdom by The Bodley Head (John Lane's UK company) on 21 January 1921.

Styles introduced Poirot, Inspector (later, Chief Inspector) Japp and Arthur Hastings. Poirot, a Belgian refugee of the Great War, is settling in England near the home of Emily Inglethorp, who helped him to his new life. His friend Hastings arrives as a guest at her home. When Mrs Inglethorp is murdered, Poirot uses his detective skills to solve the mystery.

The book includes maps of the house, the murder scene and a drawing of a fragment of a will. The true first publication of the novel was as a weekly serial in The Times, including the maps of the house and other illustrations included in the book. This novel was one of the first ten books published by Penguin Books when it began in 1935.

Styles was well received by reviewers in the UK and the US at initial publication. An analysis in 1990 was positive about the plot, considered the novel one of the few by Christie that are well anchored in time and place, a story that knows it describes the end of an era, and mentions that the plot is clever. Christie had not mastered cleverness throughout her first novel, as "too many clues tend to cancel each other out"; this was judged a difficulty "which Conan Doyle never satisfactorily overcame, but which Christie would."

The story features many of the elements that have become icons of the Golden Age of Detective Fiction, largely owing to Christie's influence. It is set in a large, isolated country manor. There are a half-dozen suspects, most of whom are hiding facts about themselves. The plot includes a number of red herrings and surprise twists.

The Mysterious Affair at Styles launched Christie's writing career. Christie and her husband subsequently named their house Styles. Hercule Poirot would go on to become one of the most famous characters in fiction. Decades later, when Christie told the story of Poirot's final case in Curtain, she set that novel at Styles.

== Composition and original publication ==
Agatha Christie began working on The Mysterious Affair at Styles in 1916, writing most of it on Dartmoor. The character of Hercule Poirot was inspired by her experience as a nurse ministering to Belgian soldiers during the First World War and by Belgian refugees living in Torquay.

The manuscript was rejected by Hodder and Stoughton and Methuen. Christie then submitted the manuscript to The Bodley Head. After keeping the submission for several months, The Bodley Head's founder, John Lane, offered to accept it provided that Christie make slight changes to the ending. She revised the penultimate chapter, changing the scene of Poirot's grand revelation from a courtroom to the library at Styles. (Some modern editions of the published book also include an appendix with the original unpublished alternative ending set in the courtroom. It is very similar to the final version in content, with dialogue from other characters replaced by dialogue from the Judge and Sir Ernest Heavywether.) Christie later stated that the contract she signed with Lane was exploitative.

The Mysterious Affair at Styles was also said to have been inspired by a real-life murder case in Mussoorie, India.

The Mysterious Affair at Styles was published by John Lane in the United States in October 1920 and by The Bodley Head in the United Kingdom on 21 January 1921. The US edition retailed at $2.00 and the UK edition at seven shillings and sixpence (7/6).

== Plot summary ==
During the First World War Arthur Hastings is on sick leave from the Western Front and is invited to stay at the manor house of Styles Court, in Essex, by his old friend John Cavendish.

On the morning of 18 July the Styles household wakes to the discovery that Emily Inglethorp, the elderly and wealthy owner, has died. She had been poisoned with strychnine. Hastings ventures out to the nearby village of Styles St Mary to enlist help from his friend Hercule Poirot. Emily's household includes her husband, Alfred Inglethorp — a younger man she recently married; her stepsons (from her first husband's previous marriage), John and Lawrence Cavendish; John's wife, Mary Cavendish; Cynthia Murdoch, the daughter of a deceased friend of the family; and Evelyn Howard, Emily's lady's companion.

Poirot learns that on Emily's death John is to inherit the manor property, in accordance with his father's will. However her money will be distributed according to her own will, which she changes at least once a year. Her most recent will favours Alfred, who will now inherit her fortune.

On the day of the murder Emily had been arguing with someone, suspected to be either Alfred or John. She had been distressed after that and apparently made a new will, but no one can find any evidence of it. Alfred had left the manor early that evening and stayed overnight in the village. Meanwhile Emily had eaten little at dinner and retired early to her room, taking her document case with her. When her body is found the case had been forced open. Nobody can explain how or when the poison was administered to her.

Inspector Japp, the investigating officer, considers Alfred to be the prime suspect, since he gains the most from his wife's death. Poirot notes that Alfred's behaviour is suspicious during the investigation. He refuses to provide an alibi and denies purchasing the strychnine in the village, despite evidence to the contrary. Although Japp is keen to arrest him, Poirot intervenes by proving he could not have purchased the poison—the signature for the purchase is not in his handwriting. Suspicion now falls on John, next to gain from Emily's will and without an alibi for the murder. Japp soon arrests him: the signature for the poison is in his handwriting; a phial that contained the poison is found in his room; a false beard and a pair of pince-nez identical to Alfred's are found within the manor.

Poirot's investigations exonerate John of the crime. He establishes that the murder was committed by Alfred Inglethorp, with aid from his cousin Evelyn Howard. The pair pretended to be enemies but were romantically involved. They added bromide, obtained from her sleeping powder, to Emily's regular evening medicine. This caused the low level of strychnine in the medicine to precipitate to the bottom of the bottle, making the final dose lethal. The pair then left false evidence that would incriminate Alfred, which they knew would be refuted at his trial. Once acquitted, he could not be tried for the crime again if genuine evidence against him was found, under the law of double jeopardy. The pair framed John as part of their plan. Evelyn forged his handwriting, and the evidence against him was fabricated.

Poirot explains that he prevented Japp from arresting Alfred because Poirot could see that Alfred wanted to be arrested. Emily's distress on the afternoon of the murder was because she had found a letter in Alfred's desk while searching for stamps. Emily's document case was forced open by Alfred when he realised she had the letter. He then hid the letter elsewhere in the room to avoid being found with it. Thanks to a chance remark by Hastings, Poirot finds the letter in Emily's room. It details Alfred's intentions for Evelyn.

== Characters ==
- Hercule Poirot – Renowned Belgian private detective. He lives in England after being displaced by the war in Europe. Asked to investigate the case by his old friend Hastings.
- Hastings – Poirot's friend, and the narrator of the story. He is a guest at Styles Court while on sick leave from the Western Front.
- Inspector Japp – A Scotland Yard detective, and the investigating officer. He is an acquaintance of Poirot at the time the novel is set.
- Emily Inglethorp – A wealthy woman in her 70s and the wife of Alfred Inglethorp. She inherited her fortune and her home of Styles Court on the death of her first husband, Mr Cavendish. She is the victim of the case.
- Alfred Inglethorp – Emily's second husband and 20 years younger than she is. Considered by her family to be a spoiled fortune-hunter.
- John Cavendish – Emily's elder stepson, from her first husband's previous marriage, and the brother of Lawrence. John has known Hastings for many years; he formerly practised as a barrister and is currently a country squire. It is he who invites Hastings to Styles near the beginning of the story. He is having problems in his marriage to his wife, Mary.
- Mary Cavendish – John's wife and a friend of Dr Bauerstein.
- Lawrence Cavendish – Emily's younger stepson from her first husband's previous marriage and the brother of John. Known to have studied medicine and qualified as a doctor.
- Evelyn Howard – Emily's lady's companion and a second cousin of Alfred Inglethorp, of whom she nevertheless expresses a strong dislike.
- Cynthia Murdoch – The daughter of a deceased friend of the family. She performs war-time work in a nearby hospital's dispensary.
- Dr Bauerstein – A well-known toxicologist living not far from Styles.
- Dorcas – A maid at Styles. Loyal to Mrs Inglethorp.

== Dedication ==
The book's dedication reads: "To my Mother".

Christie's mother, Clarissa ("Clara") Boehmer Miller (1854–1926), was a strong influence on her life and someone to whom Christie was extremely close, especially after the death of her father in 1901. It was while Christie was ill (circa 1908) that her mother suggested she write a story. The result was The House of Beauty, now lost, which hesitantly started her writing career. Christie later revised the story as The House of Dreams and it was published in issue 74 of The Sovereign Magazine in January 1926 and many years later, in 1997, in book form in While the Light Lasts and Other Stories.

Christie also dedicated her debut novel as Mary Westmacott, Giant's Bread (1930), to her mother who, by that time, had died.

== Literary significance and reception ==
The Times Literary Supplement (3 February 1921) gave the book an enthusiastic, if short, review, which stated: "The only fault this story has is that it is almost too ingenious." It went on to describe the basic set-up of the plot and concluded: "It is said to be the author's first book, and the result of a bet about the possibility of writing a detective story in which the reader would not be able to spot the criminal. Every reader must admit that the bet was won."

The New York Times Book Review (26 December 1920) was also impressed:

Though this may be the first published book of Miss Agatha Christie, she betrays the cunning of an old hand... You must wait for the last-but-one chapter in the book for the last link in the chain of evidence that enabled Mr Poirot to unravel the whole complicated plot and lay the guilt where it really belonged. And you may safely make a wager with yourself that until you have heard M. Poirot's final word on the mysterious affair at Styles, you will be kept guessing at its solution and will most certainly never lay down this most entertaining book.

The review of the novel in The Sunday Times of 20 February 1921 quoted the publisher's promotional blurb concerning Christie writing the book as the result of a bet that she would not be able to do so without the reader being able to guess the murderer then said, "Personally we did not find the "spotting" so very difficult, but we are free to admit that the story is, especially for a first adventure in fiction, very well contrived, and that the solution of the mystery is the result of logical deduction. The story, moreover, has no lack of movement, and the several characters are well drawn."

The contributor who wrote his column under the pseudonym of A Man of Kent in the 10 February 1921 issue of the Christian newspaper The British Weekly praised the novel but gave away the identity of the murderers. To wit,

It will rejoice the heart of all who truly relish detective stories, from Mr McKenna downwards. I have heard that this is Miss Christie's first book, and that she wrote it in response to a challenge. If so, the feat was amazing, for the book is put together so deftly that I can remember no recent book of the kind, which approaches it in merit. It is well written, well proportioned, and full of surprises. When does the reader first suspect the murderer? For my part, I made up my mind from the beginning that the middle-aged husband of the old lady was in every way qualified to murder her, and I refused to surrender this conviction when suspicion of him is scattered for a moment. But I was not in the least degree prepared to find that his accomplice was the woman who pretended to be a friend. I ought to say, however, that an expert in detective stories with whom I discussed it, said he was convinced from the beginning that the true culprit was the woman whom the victim in her lifetime believed to be her staunchest friend. I hope I have not revealed too much of the plot. Lovers of good detective stories will, without exception, rejoice in this book.

The Bodley Head quoted excerpts from this review in future books by Christie but understandably did not use the passages that gave away the identity of the culprits.

"Introducing Hercule Poirot, the brilliant – and eccentric – detective who, at a friend's request, steps out of retirement – and into the shadows of a classic mystery on the outskirts of Essex. The victim is the wealthy mistress of Styles Court, found in her locked bedroom with the name of her late husband on her dying lips. Poirot has a few questions for her fortune-hunting new spouse, her aimless stepsons, her private doctor, and her hired companion. The answers are positively poisonous. Who's responsible, and why, can only be revealed by the master detective himself." (Book jacket, Berkley Book edition April 1984)

In his book A Talent to Deceive – An Appreciation of Agatha Christie Robert Barnard wrote:

Christie's debut novel, from which she made £25 and John Lane made goodness knows how much. The Big House in wartime, with privations, war work and rumours of spies. Her hand was over-liberal with clues and red herrings, but it was a highly cunning hand, even at this stage

In general The Mysterious Affair at Styles is a considerable achievement for a first-off author. The country-house-party murder is a stereotype in the detective-story genre, which Christie makes no great use of. Not her sort of occasion, at least later in life, and perhaps not really her class. The family party is much more in her line, and this is what we have here. This is one of the few Christies anchored in time and space: we are in Essex, during the First World War. The family is kept together under one roof by the exigencies of war and of a matriarch demanding rather than tyrannical – not one of her later splendid monsters, but a sympathetic and lightly shaded characterisation. If the lifestyle of the family still seems to us lavish, even wasteful, nevertheless we have the half sense that we are witnessing the beginning of the end of the Edwardian summer, that the era of country-house living has entered its final phase. Christie takes advantage of this end-of-an-era feeling in several ways: while she uses the full range of servants and their testimony, a sense of decline, of break-up is evident; feudal attitudes exist, but they crack easily. The marriage of the matriarch with a mysterious nobody is the central out-of-joint event in an intricate web of subtle changes. The family is lightly but effectively characterised, and on the outskirts of the story are the villagers, the small businessmen, and the surrounding farmers – the nucleus of Mayhem Parva. It is, too, a very clever story, with clues and red herrings falling thick and fast. We are entering the age when plans of the house were an indispensable aid to the aspirant solver of detective stories, and when cleverness was more important than suspense. But here we come to a problem that Agatha Christie has not yet solved, for cleverness over the long length easily becomes exhausting, and too many clues tend to cancel each other out, as far as reader interest is concerned. These were problems which Conan Doyle never satisfactorily overcame, but which Christie would.".

In the "Binge!" article of Entertainment Weekly Issue #1343-44 (26 December 2014–3 January 2015), the writers picked The Mysterious Affair at Styles as an "EW favorite" on the list of the "Nine Great Christie Novels".

== Adaptations ==
=== Television ===
==== British ====
The Mysterious Affair at Styles was adapted as an episode for the series Agatha Christie's Poirot on 16 September 1990; the episode was specially made by ITV to celebrate the centenary of the author's birth. The cast included David Suchet as Hercule Poirot, Hugh Fraser as Lieutenant Arthur Hastings and Philip Jackson as Inspector James Japp. It was filmed at Chavenage House in Gloucestershire, England. The adaptation was generally faithful to Christie's story, although there were a number of deviations from it. The introduction of Poirot is greatly extended, including scenes of Poirot interrupting a military exercise, singing "It's a Long Way to Tipperary" with the Belgian refugees, and advising the post office of a better way to organize their products by country of origin. The adaptation also provided further elaboration on Hastings' first meeting with Poirot – the pair met during an investigation into a shooting, in which Hastings was a suspect.

==== Latvian ====
The novel was adapted as a TV miniseries for Latvijas Televīzija, titled "Slepkavība Stailzā". It was broadcast over 3 nights in 1990. The cast included Arnolds Liniņš as Puaro (Poirot's name in Latvian) and Romāns Birmanis as Hastingss (Hastings). Being a miniseries, with a total runtime of approximately 198 minutes, it included many details from the novel that were omitted from other shorter adaptations, and was generally faithful to the novel. One difference from the novel is that the inquest hearing is omitted, and instead there are more scenes from Džaps and Samerhejs (Japp and Summerhaye) searching for clues at Styles Court. Also, the ending sequence follows Christie's original unpublished version, where Poirot makes his final revelations in the courtroom.

==== French ====
It was adapted for an episode of Les Petits Meurtres d'Agatha Christie, which was broadcast in 2016. The series stars Samuel Labarthe as Swan Laurence, who replaces the character of Poirot in this adaptation. This version has many differences from the novel, but the core story is the same: a wealthy old woman is murdered by her husband together with her top business partner, who appear to hate each other but are secretly lovers. Certain aspects from the novel are retained, such as a disguise used to buy the poison with Eve Constantin (the character equivalent to Evelyn Howard) impersonating Adrien Sauvignac (the equivalent of Alfred Inglethorp), and the latter's deliberate attempt to get himself arrested so that he can produce his alibi. In this adaptation, Styles Court is a beauty spa instead of a country house.

==== Hungarian ====
In 2022, experimental Hungarian filmmaker Péter Lichter produced A titokzatos stylesi eset, a 65 minute adaptation. The film consisted of spliced footage from over 100 different silent films, combined with old school computer effects. Pál Mácsai provided narration as Poirot.

=== Audio ===
The novel was adapted for radio by Michael Bakewell as a five-part serial in 2005, as part of the Hercule Poirot radio series for BBC Radio 4. The cast included John Moffatt as Poirot and Simon Williams as Captain Hastings. Inspector Japp was played by Philip Jackson, who had played the same role in the British television adaptation. The serial was broadcast weekly from 5 September to 3 October. All five episodes were recorded on 4 April 2005 at Bush House. This version retained the first-person narration by the character of Hastings.

An adaptation for Audible was released on November 14, 2024, directed by Alice Lowe, and adapted by Anna Lea. The ensemble cast features Peter Dinklage as Poirot, Himesh Patel as Hastings, Jessica Gunning as Evie Howard, Harriet Walter as Emily Inglethorp, Rob Delaney as Alfred Inglethorp, Phil Dunster as John Cavendish, Patsy Ferran as Mary Cavendish, John Bradley as Lawrence Cavendish, and Vivian Oparah as Cynthia Murdoch. The production also received multilingual performances in Italian, Spanish, Portuguese and German. In these versions, the role of Poirot was taken by Claudio Santamaria, Sergi López, Marco Ricca and Rufus Beck.

=== Stage ===
On 14 February 2012, Great Lakes Theater in Cleveland, Ohio debuted a 65-minute stage adaptation as part of their educational programming. Adapted by David Hansen, this production is performed by a cast of five (3 men, 2 women) with most performers playing more than one role.

On 17 March 2016, the Hedgerow Theatre company in Media, Pennsylvania, premiered an adaptation by Jared Reed. While largely faithful to the novel, the character of Inspector Japp was omitted.

== Publication history ==
- 1920, John Lane (New York), October 1920, Hardcover, 296 pp
- 1920, National Book Company, Hardcover, 296 pp
- 1921, John Lane (The Bodley Head), 21 January 1921, Hardcover, 296 pp
- 1926, John Lane (The Bodley Head), June 1926, Hardcover (Cheap edition – two shillings) 319 pp
- 1931, John Lane (The Bodley Head), February 1931 (As part of the Agatha Christie Omnibus along with The Murder on the Links and Poirot Investigates), Hardcover, Priced at seven shillings and sixpence; a cheaper edition at five shillings was published in October 1932
- 1932, John Lane (The Bodley Head), July 1932, Paperback (ninepence)
- 1935, Penguin Books, 30 July 1935, Paperback (sixpence), 255 pp
- 1945, Avon Books (New York), Avon number 75, Paperback, 226 pp
- 1954, Pan Books, Paperback (Pan number 310), 189 pp
- 1959, Pan Books, Paperback (Great Pan G112)
- 1961, Bantam Books (New York), Paperback, 154 pp
- 1965, Longman (London), Paperback, 181 pp
- 1976, Dodd, Mead and Company, (Commemorative Edition following Christie's death), Hardback, 239 pp; ISBN 0-396-07224-0
- 1984, Berkley Books (New York, Division of Penguin Putnam), Paperback, 198 pp; ISBN 0-425-12961-6
- 1988, Fontana Books (Imprint of HarperCollins), Paperback, 208 pp; ISBN 0-00-617474-4
- 1989, Ulverscroft Large Print Edition, Hardcover; ISBN 0-7089-1955-3
- 2007, Facsimile of 1921 UK first edition (HarperCollins), 5 November 2007, Hardcover, 296 pp; ISBN 0-00-726513-1
- 2018, Srishti Publishers & Distributors, Paperback, 186 pp; ISBN 978-93-87022-25-6

Additional editions are listed at Fantastic Fiction, including

- 29 Hardcover editions from 1958 to September 2010 (ISBN 116928986X / 9781169289864 Publisher: Kessinger Publishing)
- 107 Paperback editions from 1970 to September 2013 (ISBN 0007527497 / 9780007527496 (UK edition) Publisher: Harper)
- 30 Audio editions from September 1994 to June 2013 (ISBN 1470887711 / 9781470887711 Publisher: Blackstone Audiobooks)
- 96 Kindle editions from December 2001 to November 2013 (ISBN B008BIGEHG).

The novel received its first true publication as an eighteen-part serialisation in The Times newspaper's Weekly Edition (aka The Times Weekly Edition) from 27 February (Issue 2252) to 25 June 1920 (Issue 2269). This version of the novel mirrored the published version with no textual differences and included the maps and illustrations of handwriting examples used in the novel. At the end of the serialisation an advertisement appeared in the newspaper, which announced, "This is a brilliant mystery novel, which has had the unique distinction for a first novel of being serialised in The Times Weekly Edition. Mr John Lane is now preparing a large edition in volume form, which will be ready immediately." Although another line of the advertisement stated that the book would be ready in August, it was first published by John Lane in the United States in October 1920 and was not published in the UK by The Bodley Head until the following year.

The Mysterious Affair at Styles later made publishing history by being one of the first ten books to be published by Penguin Books when they were launched on 30 July 1935. The book was Penguin Number 6.

The blurb on the inside flap of the dustwrapper of the first edition reads:

This novel was originally written as the result of a bet, that the author, who had previously never written a book, could not compose a detective novel in which the reader would not be able to "spot" the murderer, although having access to the same clues as the detective. The author has certainly won her bet, and in addition to a most ingenious plot of the best detective type she has introduced a new type of detective in the shape of a Belgian. This novel has had the unique distinction for a first book of being accepted by the Times as a serial for its weekly edition.
