= The Killings at Kingfisher Hill =

2020 Poirot novel by Sophie Hannah

- Author: Sophie Hannah
- Series: Hercule Poirot
- Genre: Mystery
- Publication date: August 20, 2020
- Publication place: United Kingdom
- ISBN: 0062792377
- Preceded by: The Mystery of Three Quarters
- Followed by: Hercule Poirot's Silent Night

The Killings at Kingfisher Hill is a 2020 mystery and detective novel by Sophie Hannah. It is the fourth continuation novel written by Hannah featuring Hercule Poirot, the fictional detective created by Agatha Christie, and Scotland Yard inspector Edward Catchpool, an original character created by Hannah.

== Background and publication history ==
In 2013, the estate of Agatha Christie announced that it had accepted a proposal from Sophie Hannah to publish a new Hercule Poirot novel. The novel, The Monogram Murders, was published in September 2014 and became the first in a new series of Poirot novels by Hannah.The Killings at Kingfisher Hill is the fourth novel in this series, and is preceded by Closed Casket and The Mystery of Three Quarters.

The Killings at Kingfisher HIll was published in the United Kingdom on August 20, 2020. It was published in the United States by HarperCollins on September 15, 2020.

== Reception ==
The Killings at Kingfisher Hill was reviewed positively in Publishers Weekly, Star Tribune, NPR, and The Wall Street Journal. In 2020, it was listed as one of "The Best Books to Give This Year” by The New York Times Book Review, which described it as "a psychological thriller with a characteristically intricate and humorous puzzle of a plot."

Reviewers from other publications had more mixed reactions to the novel. A review in The Boar stated that "It's confusing at points and the eventual revelations are a little too unbelievable to be satisfying, but it's still a generally light read that mostly plays fair with the reader."
