= List of actors who have played Hercule Poirot =

The following is a list of actors (Note: The gender-neutral term actors is used in this article. Also note that this list includes female actors, namely Katharina Thalbach.) who have played Hercule Poirot in various media.

== Stage plays ==
Name	Title	Date	Notes
Charles Laughton	Alibi	1928	Prince of Wales Theatre
Leonard Rossiter	Alibi	1956	Grand Theatre, Wolverhampton
Ronald Magill	Alibi	1957	Salisbury Playhouse
Denis Huett	Alibi	1987	Theatre Royal, Nottingham
Francis L. Sullivan	Black Coffee	1930	Original play by Agatha Christie
Francis L. Sullivan	Peril at End House	1940–41	Adapted by Arnold Ridley
Ronnie Barker	Peril at End House	1952	Oxford Playhouse
Ronnie Barker	Black Coffee	1953	Theatre Royal, Norwich
Ronald Radd	Black Coffee	1952	Alexandra Theatre, Birmingham
Patrick Cargill	Black Coffee	1980	Theatre Royal, Windsor
Alfred Marks	Black Coffee	1988	UK tour
Robert Powell	Black Coffee	2014	UK tour
Jason Durr	Black Coffee	2014	UK tour
Allan Corduner	Murder on the Orient Express	2017	Adapted by Ken Ludwig
Katharina Thalbach	Murder on the Orient Express	2021	Adapted by Ken Ludwig
Henry Goodman	Murder on the Orient Express	2022	Adapted by Ken Ludwig
Michael Maloney	Murder on the Orient Express	2024–25	Adapted by Ken Ludwig
Cameron Rhodes	Murder on the Orient Express	2025	Adapted by Ken Ludwig
Cameron Rhodes	Death on the Nile	2026	Adapted by Ken Ludwig
Alan Committie	Black Coffee	2025	Pieter Toerien Theatre
Alan Committie	The Murder of Roger Ackroyd	2026	Adapted by Mark Shanahan, Montecasino Theatre
Campbell Scott	Murder on the Links	2025	Adapted by Darko Tresnjak
Mark Hadfield	Death on the Nile	2025–2026	Adapted by Ken Ludwig
Peter Polycarpou	The Hollow	2026–2027	Adapted by Tamsin Oglesby

== Radio and audio dramas ==
Name	Title	Date	Type
Orson Welles	The Campbell Playhouse - "The Murder of Roger Ackroyd"	1939	Radio (CBS)
Maurice Tarplin	Murder Clinic - "The Tragedy at Marsden Manor"	1942	Radio (Mutual)
Harold Huber	Hercule Poirot	1945	Radio (Mutual-CBS)
Richard Williams	Murder in the Mews	1955	BBC Light Programme
Maurice Denham	Hercule Poirot	1985	BBC Radio 4
Peter Sallis	Hercule Poirot	1986	BBC Radio 4
John Moffatt	Hercule Poirot	1987-2007	BBC Radio 4
Ben Whitehead	The Murder of Roger Ackroyd	2015	The Wireless Theatre Company
Tom Conti	Murder on the Orient Express	2017	Audible original
Alfred Molina	The Murder on the Links	2021	L.A. Theatre Works
Peter Dinklage	The Mysterious Affair at Styles	2024	Audible original
Peter Dinklage	The ABC Murders	2025	Audible original
Sergi López	El misterioso caso de Styles	2025	Audible original (Spanish)
Sergi López	El misterio de la guía de ferrocarriles	2026	Audible original (Spanish)
Claudio Santamaria	Poirot a Styles Court	2025	Audible original (Italian)
Claudio Santamaria	La serie infernale	2026	Audible original (Italian)
Marco Ricca	O Misterioso Caso de Styles	2025	Audible original (Brazilian)
Rufus Beck	Das geheimnisvolle Verbrechen in Styles	2025	Audible original (German)
Rufus Beck	Die Morde des Herrn ABC	2026	Audible original (German)

== Theatrical films ==
Name	Title	Date	Type
Austin Trevor	Alibi	1931	British film
Austin Trevor	Black Coffee	1931	British film
Austin Trevor	Lord Edgware Dies	1934	British film
Tony Randall	The Alphabet Murders	1965	British film
Albert Finney	Murder on the Orient Express	1974	Finney received an Academy Award nomination for this performance (British)
Peter Ustinov	Death on the Nile	1978	British film
Peter Ustinov	Evil Under the Sun	1982	British film
Peter Ustinov	Appointment with Death	1988	American film
Anatoly Ravikovich	Zagadka Endkhauza	1989	Soviet film
Kenneth Branagh	Murder on the Orient Express	2017	Also directed by Branagh (American), these films are produced by 20th Century Studios
Kenneth Branagh	Death on the Nile	2022	Also directed by Branagh (American), these films are produced by 20th Century Studios
Kenneth Branagh	A Haunting in Venice	2023	Also directed by Branagh (American), these films are produced by 20th Century Studios

== Television and DTV films ==
Name	Title	Date	Type
José Ferrer	Hercule Poirot - "The Disappearance of Mr. Davenheim"	1961	Unaired pilot (American)
Horst Bollmann	Black Coffee	1973	Television film (West German)
Peter Ustinov	Thirteen at Dinner	1985	Television film
Peter Ustinov	Dead Man's Folly	1986	Television film
Peter Ustinov	Murder in Three Acts	1986	Television film
Ian Holm	Murder by the Book	1986	Television film (British)
Alfred Molina	Murder on the Orient Express	2001	Television film (American)
Kontantin Raikin	Neudacha Puaro	2002	Television film (Russian)
Anthony O'Donnell	Agatha Christie: A Life in Pictures	2004	Television film (British)

== Television series ==
Name	Title	Date	Type
Heini Göbel	Die Galerie der großen Detektive - "Hercule Poirot klärt den Mord im Orient-Express auf"	1955	TV episode (West German)
Martin Gabel	General Electric Theater - "The Disappearance of Mr. Davenheim"	1962	TV episode (American)
David Suchet	Agatha Christie's Poirot	1989-2013	TV series (British)
Arnolds Liniņš	Slepkavība Stailzā	1990	Miniseries (Latvian)
Kōtarō Satomi	Agatha Christie's Great Detectives Poirot and Marple	2004-2005	Anime series (Japanese)
John Malkovich	The ABC Murders	2018	TV serial (British)
Edward Bluemel	Hercule	2027	TV series (British)

== Video games ==
Name	Title	Date	Type
David Suchet	Agatha Christie: Murder on the Orient Express	2006	Voice role
Kevin Delaney	Agatha Christie: Evil Under the Sun	2007	Voice role
Julien Dutel	Agatha Christie: The ABC Murders	2016	Voice role
Will De Renzy-Martin	Agatha Christie – Hercule Poirot: The First Cases	2021	Voice role
Will De Renzy-Martin	Agatha Christie – Hercule Poirot: The London Cass	2023	Voice role
Leslie Clack	Agatha Christie: Murder on the Orient Express	2023	Voice role
Geoffrey Bateman	Agatha Christie: Death on the Nile	2025	Voice role

== See also ==
- List of actors who have played Miss Marple
