= Baggerly =

Baggerly is a surname. Notable people with the surname include:

- Cora Baggerly Older, née Cora Baggerly (1875–1968), American historian
- Rowena Cook Baggerly (1917 or 1918–2004), American actress
