= Three Sons =

1939 US film directed by Jack Hively

- Directed by: Jack Hively; James Anderson (assistant)
- Screenplay by: John Twist
- Based on: Sweepings; 1929 novel by Lester Cohen
- Produced by: Robert Sisk
- Starring: Edward Ellis; William Gargan; J. Edward Bromberg; Robert Stanton; Katharine Alexander
- Cinematography: Russell Metty
- Edited by: Theron Warth
- Music by: Roy Webb
- Production company: RKO Radio Pictures
- Distributed by: RKO Pictures
- Release date: October 13, 1939 (US)
- Running time: 72 minutes
- Country: United States
- Language: English

Three Sons is a 1939 American drama film directed by Jack Hively using a screenplay by John Twist, based on the novel, Sweepings by Lester Cohen. Produced and distributed by RKO Radio Pictures, and released on October 13, 1939, it is a remake of an earlier RKO film, Sweepings (1933). The film stars Edward Ellis, William Gargan, J. Edward Bromberg and Robert Stanton (whose real name was Kirby Grant, which he would use for most of his career). Gargan, who plays the uncle in this film, had played one of the sons in the earlier film.

== Plot ==
Daniel Pardway (Edward Ellis) a department store owner is deeply saddened to learn that none of his grown sons are interested in taking over the business he has worked so hard to build. To coerce them, he even tries giving them shares of company stock. In the end, only the youngest son shows any interest at all.

== Cast ==
- Edward Ellis as Daniel Pardway
- William Gargan as Thane Pardway
- Kent Taylor as Gene Pardway
- J. Edward Bromberg as Abe Ullman
- Katharine Alexander as Abigail Pardway
- Virginia Vale as Phoebe Pardway
- Robert Stanton as Bert Pardway (as Robert Stanton)
- Dick Hogan as Freddie Pardway
- Grady Sutton as Grimson
- Pamela Blake as Mamie Donaldson (as Adele Pearce)
- Alexander D'Arcy as Prince Nicky - Phoebe's Husband
- Barbara Pepper as Viola
