= Wanderer of the Wasteland (1935 film) =

Western film directed by Otho Lovering

- Directed by: Otho Lovering
- Screenplay by: Stuart Anthony
- Based on: Wanderer of the Wasteland by Zane Grey
- Produced by: Harold Hurley; William T. Lackey
- Starring: Dean Jagger; Gail Patrick; Edward Ellis; Monte Blue; Buster Crabbe; Trixie Friganza
- Cinematography: Ben F. Reynolds
- Edited by: Everett Douglas
- Production company: Paramount Pictures
- Distributed by: Paramount Pictures
- Release date: September 9, 1935
- Running time: 62 minutes
- Country: United States
- Language: English

Wanderer of the Wasteland is a 1935 American Western film directed by Otho Lovering and written by Stuart Anthony. It is based on the 1923 novel Wanderer of the Wasteland by Zane Grey. The film stars Dean Jagger, Gail Patrick, Edward Ellis, Monte Blue, Buster Crabbe, and Trixie Friganza. The film was released on September 9, 1935, by Paramount Pictures.

== Plot ==
Adam Larey escapes after being accused of a crime he did not commit. Larey later joins a gang of outlaws in the wastelands of the desert that prey on gold prospectors and eventually clears his name.

== Cast ==
- Dean Jagger as Adam Larey
- Gail Patrick as Ruth Virey
- Edward Ellis as Dismukes
- Monte Blue as Guerd Larey
- Buster Crabbe as Big Ben
- Trixie Friganza as Big Jo
- Raymond Hatton as Merryvale
- Charles Waldron as Mr. Virey
- Anna Q. Nilsson as Mrs. Virey
- Leif Erickson as Lawrence
- Tammany Young as Paducah
- Kenneth Harlan as Bob
- Fuzzy Knight as Deputy Scott
- Benny Baker as Piano Player
- Stanley Andrews as Sheriff Collinshaw
- Jim Thorpe as Charlie Jim
- Alfred Delcambre as Deputy Hines
- Al St. John as Tattooer
- Chester Gan as Ling
- Pat O'Malley as Jed

== Preservation status ==
- A print and trailer are held at the Library of Congress.
