= Sophie Hannah =

British poet and novelist (born 1971)

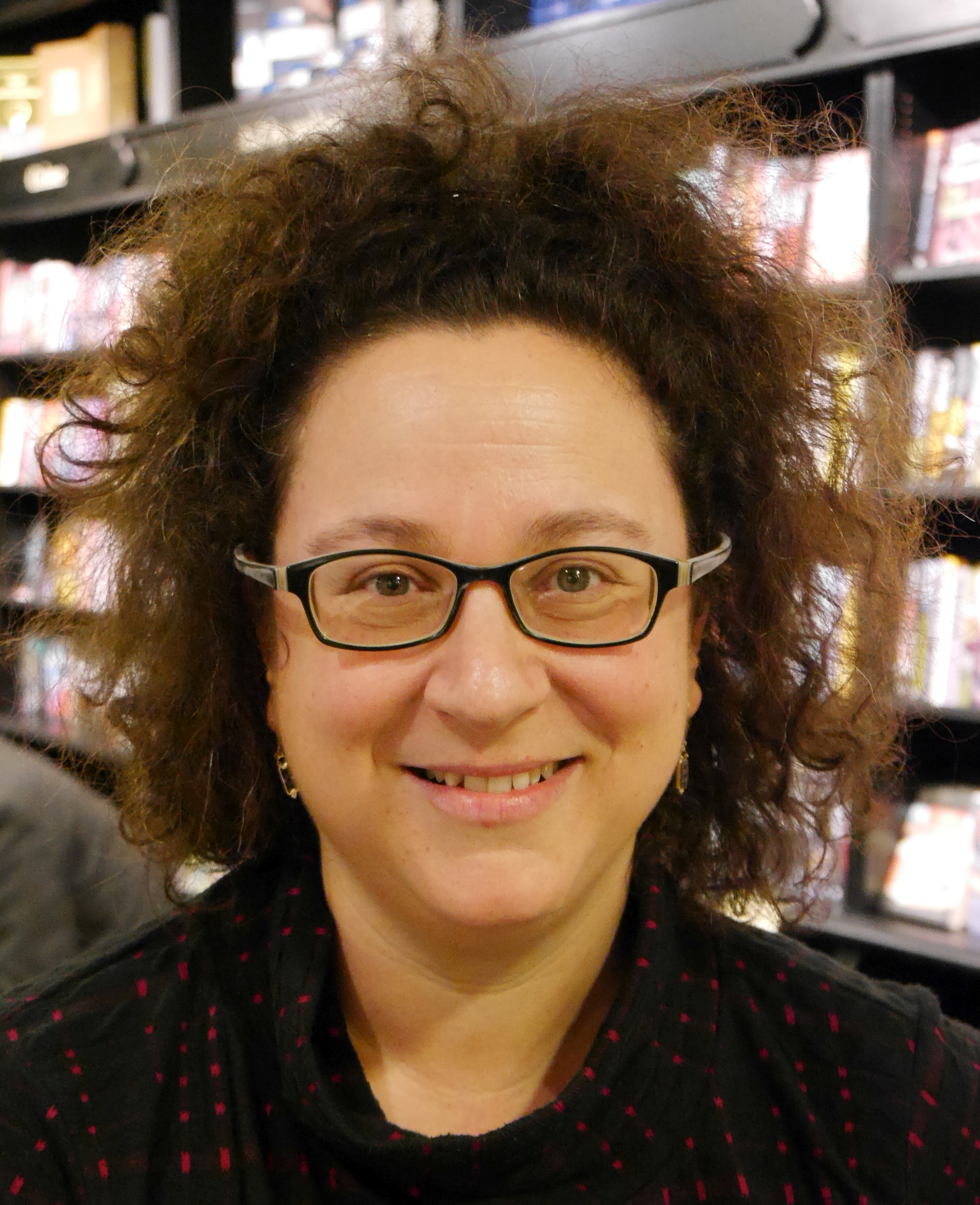
Sophie Hannah at Hatchards, London, November 2018

Sophie Hannah (born 1971 or 1972) is a British poet and novelist.

== Biography ==
Hannah was born in Manchester, England; her mother is the author Adèle Geras and her father is the political theorist Norman Geras. She attended Beaver Road Primary School in Didsbury and the University of Manchester. From 1997 to 1999 she was Fellow Commoner in Creative Arts at Trinity College, Cambridge, and between 1999 and 2001 a junior research fellow of Wolfson College, Oxford. She was elected a Fellow of the Royal Society of Literature in 2024. She lives with her husband and two children in Cambridge, where she is an Honorary Fellow of Lucy Cavendish College.

== Publications ==
Hannah published her first book of poems, The Hero and the Girl Next Door, at the age of 24. Her style is often compared to the light verse of Wendy Cope and the surrealism of Lewis Carroll. She has published five collections of poetry with Carcanet Press. In 2004 she was named one of the Poetry Book Society's Next Generation poets. Her poems are studied at GCSE (including "Rubbish at Adultery" and "Your Dad Did What?"), A-level, and degree level across the UK.

Hannah is better known for her psychological crime novels which have been Top Ten Sunday Times bestsellers and sold millions of copies worldwide. Her first novel, Little Face, was published in 2006, and her latest contemporary crime novel, The Couple at the Table, was published in 2022.

Hannah has written a series of five novels based on Agatha Christie's Hercule Poirot. Hannah has referred to such works as "continuation novels," a subgenre of the crime novel. Her latest in this series, Hercule Poirot's Silent Night, was an Amazon UK No. 1 bestseller.

Hannah's murder mystery musical The Mystery of Mr. E (co-written with composer Annette Armitage) was adapted into a feature film in 2023 and released on Amazon Prime.

Hannah has translated three children's picture books from Swedish as well as writing a work of social psychology entitled How to Hold a Grudge: from resentment to contentment: the power of grudges to transform your life. In 2023, Hannah released a self-help book titled The Double Best Method.

She won the 2023 Crime Writers' Association Dagger in the Library, and is a member of the prestigious Detection Club.

== Other professional activities ==
Hannah participated in the creation of a master's degree in Crime and Thriller Writing at the University of Cambridge, for which she is the main teacher and course director.

Hannah also founded and is CEO of, and coach at, Dream Author Coaching Ltd, a coaching programme for writers and/or anyone who wants to write.

== Works ==
=== Movie ===
- The Mystery of Mr. E, a murder mystery musical

=== Fiction: The Waterhouse and Zailer series ===
1. Little Face (Hodder & Stoughton, 2006)
2. Hurting Distance (Hodder, 2007); also published as The Truth-Teller's Lie (2010)
3. The Point of Rescue (Hodder, 2008); also as The Wrong Mother (2009) (adapted for the TV Series Case Sensitive starring Olivia Williams and Darren Boyd)
4. The Other Half Lives (Hodder, 2009) also as The Dead Lie Down (2009) (adapted for the TV Series Case Sensitive starring Olivia Williams and Darren Boyd)
5. A Room Swept White (Hodder, 2010) also as The Cradle in the Grave (2011)
6. Lasting Damage (Hodder, 2011) also as The Other Woman's House (2012)
7. Kind of Cruel (Hodder, 2012)
8. The Carrier (Hodder, 2013)
9. The Telling Error (Hodder, 2014) also as Woman with a Secret (2015)
10. Pictures Or It Didn’t Happen (Hodder, 2015) also as The Warning: A Short Story (2015)
11. The Narrow Bed (Hodder, 2016) also as The Next to Die (2019)
12. The Couple at the Table (Hodder, 2022)

=== Fiction: Hercule Poirot mysteries ===
- The Monogram Murders (2014)
- Closed Casket (2016)
- The Mystery of Three Quarters (2018)
- The Killings at Kingfisher Hill (2020)
- Hercule Poirot's Silent Night (2023)
- The Last Death of The Year (2025)

=== Fiction: quirky black comedies ===
- Gripless (1999)
- Cordial and Corrosive: An Unfairy Tale (2000)
- The Superpower of Love (2002)

=== Short story collections ===
- The Fantastic Book of Everybody's Secrets (2008)
- Something Untoward: Six Tales of Domestic Terror (2012)
- The Visitors Book (2015)

=== Fiction: standalone crime and supernatural ===
- The Orphan Choir (Hammer, 2013)
- A Game for All the Family (Hodder & Stoughton, 2015)
- Did You See Melody? (Hodder & Stoughton, 2017) also as Keep Her Safe (2017)
- The Understudy (Hodder & Stoughton, 2019)
- Haven't They Grown (Hodder & Stoughton, 2019) also known as Perfect Little Children (2019)

=== Non-fiction ===
- How to Hold a Grudge (Hodder & Stoughton, 2018)
- Happiness, a Mystery: And 66 Attempts to Solve It (Wellcome Collection, 2020)
- The Double Best Method (Amazon KDP)

=== For young children ===
- Carrot the Goldfish, illustrated by Jean Baylis (Hamish Hamilton, 1992)
- The Box Room: poems for children (Orchard Books, 2001)

=== Translations ===
The Swedish-language Moomin picture books were written and illustrated by Tove Jansson.

- The Book about Moomin, Mymble and Little My [1952] (Sort of Books, 2001) – new verse translation
- Who Will Comfort Toffle? [1960] (Sort of, 2003) – new verse translation
- The Dangerous Journey [1977] (Sort of, 2010) – "new verse translation of the third rhyming tale from Moomin Valley"

=== Poetry collections ===
- Early Bird Blues (1993) – limited edition pamphlet
- Second Helping of Your Heart (1994) – limited edition pamphlet
- The Hero and the Girl Next Door (Carcanet Press,1995)
- Hotels Like Houses (Carcanet, 1996)
- Leaving and Leaving You (Carcanet, 1999)
- Love Me Slender: Poems About Love (2000)
- First of the Last Chances (Carcanet, 2003)
- Selected Poems 2006
- Pessimism for Beginners (Carcanet, 2007)
- Marrying the Ugly Millionaire: New and Collected Poems (Carcanet, 2015)
