= A Man Betrayed (1941 film) =

1941 film

- Theatrical Poster
- Directed by: John H. Auer
- Written by: Jack Moffitt
- Screenplay by: Isabel Dawn
- Story by: Tom Kilpatrick
- Produced by: Armand Schaefer
- Starring: John Wayne; Frances Dee; Edward Ellis; Wallace Ford; Ward Bond; Harold Huber; Alexander Granach
- Cinematography: Jack A. Marta
- Edited by: Charles Craft
- Music by: Mort Glickman; Paul Sawtell
- Production company: Republic Pictures
- Distributed by: Republic Pictures
- Release dates: March 7, 1941 (Los Angeles); March 26, 1941 (New York)
- Running time: 82 minutes
- Country: United States
- Language: English

A Man Betrayed is a 1941 American dramatic comedy film directed by John H. Auer and starring John Wayne, Frances Dee and Edward Ellis. It was produced and distributed by Republic Pictures. In the United Kingdom, the film was released as Citadel of Crime.

== Plot ==
Bucolic lawyer Lynn Hollister fights big-city corruption when he tries to prove that politician Tom Cameron is a crook. Hollister is in love with the politician's daughter Sabra.

== Cast ==
- John Wayne as Lynn Hollister
- Frances Dee as Sabra Cameron
- Edward Ellis as Boss Thomas "Tom" Cameron
- Wallace Ford as Casey ("Globe" newspaper reporter)
- Ward Bond as Floyd, Amato's goon
- Harold Huber as Morris "Morrie" Slade
- Alexander Granach as T. Amato, Club Inferno Manager
- Barnett Parker as George, the Camerons' Butler
- Edwin Stanley as the Prosecutor
- Harry Hayden as lawyer Don Langworthy
- Tim Ryan as Mr. Wilson, insurance agent
- Russell Hicks as District Attorney C. R. Pringle
- Pierre Watkin as the Governor
- Ferris Taylor as Mayor Al

== Reception ==
In a contemporary review for The New York Times, critic Thomas M. Pryor wrote: "With more action and less talk, 'A Man Betrayed' might have amounted to something better than just a torpid expose of a political boss. For the new film ... reveals nothing new about the workings of machine politics, nor does it afford any suspense as to what will ultimately happen ... The plot is talked away in the first fifteen minutes and, except for a lively election-day skirmish between rival mobsters and graveyard voters, there just isn't anything to arrest one's attention."

The Los Angeles Times reviewer wrote: "As though embossed, a character occasionally stands out on the screen from among the welter of rubber-stamp types. John Wayne manages such a characterization in 'A Man Betrayed.' ... The story is engrossing particularly from this characterization ... Otherwise the yarn is one of those murder things with crooks in high and low places, and the hero bent on a whodunit mission to the big city."

== See also ==
- John Wayne filmography

== Bibliography ==
- Fetrow, Alan G. Feature Films, 1940-1949: a United States Filmography. McFarland, 1994.
