= Kit Carson (1940 film) =

- Theatrical release poster
- Directed by: George B. Seitz; John E. Burch (assistant)
- Written by: Evelyn Wells
- Screenplay by: George Bruce
- Based on: newspaper serial by Evelyn Wells
- Produced by: Edward Small
- Starring: Jon Hall; Lynn Bari; Dana Andrews
- Cinematography: John J. Mescall; Robert Pittack
- Edited by: William F. Claxton; Fred R. Feitshans Jr.
- Music by: Edward Ward
- Production company: Edward Small Productions
- Distributed by: United Artists
- Release date: August 30, 1940 (United States)
- Running time: 97 minutes
- Country: United States
- Language: English

Kit Carson is a 1940 Western film directed by George B. Seitz and starring Jon Hall as Kit Carson, Lynn Bari as Delores Murphy, and Dana Andrews as Captain John C. Frémont . This picture was filmed on location at Cayente (Kayenta), Arizona and was one of the early films to use Monument Valley as a backdrop. The supporting cast features Ward Bond as a character named "Ape", future Lone Ranger Clayton Moore, and Raymond Hatton as Jim Bridger.

== Plot ==
Kit Carson and his two saddle pals, Ape and Lopez are attacked by Indians. They manage to escape unscathed and make their way to Fort Bridger, where Captain John Fremont hires Carson to guide a wagon train westward to California south along the Oregon Trail. Both Carson and Fremont fall in love with pretty Dolores Murphy, on her way to her father's hacienda in Monterey. Meanwhile, General Castro, the Mexican Governor General of California, arms the Shoshone Indians in an effort to keep the Americans out of California.

== Cast ==
- Jon Hall as Kit Carson
- Lynn Bari as Dolores Murphy
- Dana Andrews as Captain John C. Frémont
- Harold Huber as Lopez
- Ward Bond as Ape
- Renie Riano as Miss Pilchard
- Clayton Moore as Paul Terry
- Rowena Cook as Alice Terry
- Raymond Hatton as Jim Bridger
- Harry Strang as Sergeant Clanahan
- C. Henry Gordon as General José Castro
- Lew Merrill as General Mariano Guadalupe Vallejo
- Stanley Andrews as Thomas O. Larkin
- Edwin Maxwell as John Sutter
- George Lynn as James King (as Peter Lynn)
- William Farnum as Don Miguel Murphy

== Production ==
The movie was one of several Edward Small made for United Artists. Victor McLaglen was originally announced for the title role, and then Randolph Scott. Joel McCrea and Henry Fonda were also named.

Jon Hall had just made South of Pago Pago for Edward Small and was borrowed from Samuel Goldwyn Productions. Lynn Bari was borrowed from 20th Century Fox. Filming started on March 10, 1940. It was shot on location near Kayenta, Arizona.

The film was later remade as Frontier Uprising (1961).

== Reception ==
Filmink felt that Hall was not comfortable in the lead role but the film was "saved by its production values and support cast".
