= Main Street Lawyer =

1939 film by Dudley Murphy

- Theatrical release poster
- Directed by: Dudley Murphy
- Screenplay by: Joseph Krumgold; Devery Freeman
- Story by: Harry Hamilton
- Produced by: Robert North
- Starring: Edward Ellis; Anita Louise; Robert Baldwin; Harold Huber; Clem Bevans; Margaret Hamilton
- Cinematography: Jack A. Marta
- Edited by: William Morgan
- Music by: Cy Feuer; William Lava
- Production company: Republic Pictures
- Distributed by: Republic Pictures
- Release date: November 3, 1939
- Running time: 72 minutes
- Country: United States
- Language: English

Main Street Lawyer is a 1939 American crime film directed by Dudley Murphy and written by Joseph Krumgold and Devery Freeman. The film stars Edward Ellis, Anita Louise, Robert Baldwin, Harold Huber, Clem Bevans and Margaret Hamilton. The film was released on November 3, 1939, by Republic Pictures.

== Cast ==
- Edward Ellis as Abraham Lincoln 'Link' Boggs
- Anita Louise as Honey Boggs
- Robert Baldwin as Tom Morris
- Harold Huber as Tony Marco
- Clem Bevans as Zeke
- Margaret Hamilton as Lucy
- Beverly Roberts as Flossie
- Henry Kolker as Donnelly
- Willard Robertson as John Ralston
- Richard Lane as Ballou
- Ferris Taylor as Trial Judge
- Wallis Clark as Reynolds
