= List of actors who have played Miss Marple =

The following is a list of actors who have played Jane Marple in various media.

== Stage plays ==
Name	Title	Date	Notes
Barbara Mullen	Murder at the Vicarage	1949–1950	New Theatre, Northampton and Playhouse Theatre, London
Barbara Mullen	Murder at the Vicarage	1974–1975	Touring production
Deddie Davies	Murder at the Vicarage	1965	Salisbury Playhouse
Stephanie Cole	Murder at the Vicarage	1966	Salisbury Playhouse
Avril Angers	Murder at the Vicarage	1976–1977	Touring production
Muriel Pavlow	Murder at the Vicarage	1977–1978	Touring production
Gabrielle Hamilton	Murder at the Vicarage	1978–1979	Touring production
Dulcie Gray	A Murder is Announced	1977–1978	UK tour
Judi Farr	A Murder is Announced	2013–2014	Australian tour
Liza Goddard	The Mirror Crack’d	2026	The Mill at Sonning

== Radio and audio dramas ==
Name	Title	Date	Type
June Whitfield	Miss Marple	1993-2001	BBC Radio 4
June Whitfield	Miss Marple's Final Cases	2015	BBC Radio 4
Toni Collette	The Murder at the Vicarage	2026	Audible original

== Theatrical films ==
Name	Title	Date	Type
Margaret Rutherford	Murder She Said	1961	British film
Margaret Rutherford	Murder at the Gallop	1963	British film
Margaret Rutherford	Murder Most Foul	1964	British film
Margaret Rutherford	Murder Ahoy!	1964	British film
Margaret Rutherford	The Alphabet Murders	1965	British film
Angela Lansbury	The Mirror Crack'd	1980	British film
Ita Ever	Secret of the Blackbirds	1983	Soviet film

== Television and DTV films ==
Name	Title	Date	Type
Inge Langen	Mord im Pfarrhaus	1970	Television film (West German)
Helen Hayes	A Caribbean Mystery	1983	Television film (American)
Helen Hayes	Murder with Mirrors	1984	Television film (American)

== Television series ==
Name	Title	Date	Type
Gracie Fields	Goodyear TV Playhouse - "A Murder is Announced"	1956	TV episode (American)
Joan Hickson	Agatha Christie's Miss Marple	1984-1992	TV series (British)
Ita Ever	Miss Marple'i lood	1990	TV series (Soviet-Estonian)
Kaoru Yachigusa	Agatha Christie's Great Detectives Poirot and Marple	2004-2005	Anime series (Japanese)
Geraldine McEwan	Agatha Christie's Marple	2004-2008	TV series (British)
Julia McKenzie	Agatha Christie's Marple	2009-2013	TV series (British)
Julie Cox	Agatha Christie's Marple - "The Murder at the Vicarage"	2004	TV series (British)
Isabella Pariss	Agatha Christie's Marple - "At Bertram's Hotel"	2007	TV series (British)
Yunjin Kim	Ms. Ma, Nemesis	2018	TV series (South Korean)

== See also ==
- List of actors who have played Hercule Poirot
