= The Monogram Murders =

2014 Poirot novel by Sophie Hannah

- Dust-jacket illustration of the first UK edition
- Author: Sophie Hannah
- Language: English
- Series: Hercule Poirot
- Genre: Mystery
- Published: September 9, 2014 HarperCollins
- Publication place: United Kingdom
- Media type: Print (hardback and paperback)
- Pages: 384 pp (first edition, hardcover)
- ISBN: 0-00-754741-2
- Followed by: Closed Casket

The Monogram Murders is a 2014 mystery novel by British writer Sophie Hannah featuring characters created by Agatha Christie. It is the first in Hannah's series of Hercule Poirot books, continuation novels sanctioned by the estate of Agatha Christie. The novel was followed by Closed Casket (2016), The Mystery of Three Quarters (2018), The Killings at Kingfisher Hill (2020), Hercule Poirot’s Silent Night (2023), and The Last Death of the Year (2025). The Monogram Murders introduces the original character Inspector Edward Catchpool as a new companion for Poirot.

== Plot ==
While dining at a London coffee house, Hercule Poirot meets Jennie Hobbs, a young woman who claims she will soon be murdered and nothing can be done to stop it. Returning to the guest house where he is staying, Poirot relays the story to Scotland Yard Inspector Edward Catchpool. Catchpool mentions he is investigating the murders of three guests at the Bloxham Hotel – Harriet Sippel, Ida Gransbury and Richard Negus – who were found dead in their respective rooms with a monogrammed cufflink in their mouths. The staff was alerted after finding a note that read, "MAY THEY NEVER REST IN PEACE. 121. 238. 317." Poirot offers his assistance.

The following day, Poirot accompanies Catchpool to meet with Luca Lazzari, the Bloxham's owner. The two learn all three victims arrived at the hotel on the same day, their rooms booked and paid for ahead of time, and lived in a village called Great Holling. Additionally, Negus was engaged to Ida but left Great Holling in 1913 after the deaths of former vicar Patrick Ives and his wife, Frances.

Catchpool travels to Great Holling to meet with Margaret Ernst, the most recent vicar's widow, who relays the events of 1913. Jennie, who worked in the Ives household as a maid, started a rumor that Ives was extorting money from villagers under the guise of helping them communicate with dead loved ones. Harriet, Ida, and Negus spread the rumor, leading to Ives being removed from his post. Frances committed suicide, and a heartbroken Ives did the same shortly afterward.

In London, Poirot meets with artist Nancy Ducane, who was not only seen leaving the Bloxham on the night of the murders but was also a former resident of Great Holling. Nancy refuses to provide details when pressed about Great Holling, but Poirot and Constable Stanley Beer find a pair of keys that correspond to two of the victims' hotel rooms. Poirot meets with Catchpool at the Bloxham upon receiving news of a fourth murder, finding a pool of blood, a monogrammed cufflink, and Jennie's hat. A subsequent encounter with Nancy reveals she was having an affair with Ives, while Jennie, who was also in love with Ives, started the rumor out of jealousy.

Poirot and Catchpool decide to visit Samuel Kidd, the witness who saw Nancy at the Bloxham. However, instead of Samuel, they are greeted by Jennie, who Poirot reveals was formerly engaged to Samuel before she met Ives. After traveling to Great Holling in response to a serious attack on Margaret and having a conversation with village doctor Ambrose Flowerday, Poirot declares the case resolved.

Gathering the hotel staff and suspects together, Poirot reveals Nancy and Jennie conspired with Kidd to kill the victims. Nancy begins to confess but is fatally stabbed by Jennie. Jennie explains she started the rumor to save Ives from the scandal of his affair. When Negus contacted her out of remorse for his actions, the two devised a plan to kill all four guilty parties involved. However, Jennie secretly revealed the plan to Nancy and convinced Negus to die earlier than planned. Jennie killed Nancy after she revealed her relationship with Ives had been a physical one.

Four days later, Poirot and Catchpool receive a letter from Dr. Flowerday and Margaret Ernst, who have decided to marry thanks to Poirot's intervention.

== Characters ==
=== London ===
- Hercule Poirot - Renowned Belgian detective. Whilst taking a short break away from his London Flat, Poirot becomes involved a murder case at the Bloxham Hotel.
- Edward Catchpool - An officer at Scotland Yard staying at the same guest house as Poirot, and the narrator of the story. Initially involved in the murder case, Catchpool later assists Poirot in his investigation.
- Blanche Unsworth - Owner of the guest house in which Poirot and Catchpool are staying.
- Luca Lazzari - The eccentric owner of the Bloxham Hotel.
- Jennie Hobbs - A young woman whom Poirot meets at the beginning of the story - she is convinced of her impending murder. Jennie formerly lived in Great Holling and worked for the Ives. She was in love with Patrick Ives.
- Nancy Ducane - An attractive woman in her 40's and a renowned artist. Nancy formerly lived in Great Holling and was in love with the village Vicar.
- Euphemia 'Fee' Spring - Owner of Pleasant's Coffee House - she impresses Poirot with her eye for details.
- St John Wallace - Artistic rival to Nancy Ducane.
- Lady Louise Wallace - Friend of Nancy Ducane and Jennie Hobbs' former employer.
- Henry Negus - Brother of Richard Negus. He visits London to collect his brother's affairs after the murders.

=== Great Holling ===
- Patrick Ives - Former vicar of Great Holling, he was the subject of a vicious rumour spread by Harriet Sippel. This rumour lead to the death of his wife and himself in 1913.
- Frances Ives - Wife to Patrick, she is severely affected by the rumour surrounding her husband and kills herself.
- Harriet Sippel - One of the victims at the Bloxham Hotel. Once a kind and caring woman, Harriet became a spiteful gossip after the early death of her husband George. She was responsible for initially spreading the rumour.
- Ida Gransbury - One of the victims at the Bloxham Hotel. An extremely pious woman and Richard's former fiancée, Ida supported Harriet in spreading the rumour about the Ives'.
- Richard Negus - One of the victims at the Bloxham Hotel. A wealthy lawyer and Ida's former fiancé, Richard initially supported the rumour about the Ives', but after their deaths he left Great Holling, breaking off his engagement.
- Dr. Ambrose Flowerday - Doctor for Great Holling. One of the few villagers to support the Ives', he continues to preserve their names after their deaths.
- Margaret Ernst - Widow of the former Vicar. Whilst she was not present for the events of 1913, Margaret took it upon herself to safeguard the Ives' gravestone from sceptical villagers.
- Victor Meakin - Owner of the King's Head Inn, he is reluctant to give any information about the murder victims.
- Walter Stoakley - A drunken old man at the King's Head Inn, Stoakley is later revealed to be Frances Ives' father.

== Reviews ==
The book received mixed reviews. Alexander McCall Smith, writing for The New York Times, wrote that Hannah's Poirot "markedly" lived up to expectations; Andrew Wilson reviewed the book for The Independent and concluded that Poirot fans are "in safe hands" with Hannah's novel. On the other hand, Laura Thompson of The Guardian described Poirot as written by Hannah as "oddly lifeless" and that the book bore "very little resemblance" to an Agatha Christie book, being a "dense, complicated, vaguely old-fashioned detective story, containing diluted essence of Poirot."

== Continuity with Christie's original stories ==
The novel is set in 1929, placing it shortly after The Mystery of the Blue Train, published 1928, and roughly three years before Peril at End House, published 1932. It is therefore set in a relatively early stage of Poirot's long career after he settled in England as a refugee from the Great War, following a distinguished career in his native Belgium. Poirot's occasional sidekick and chronicler Arthur Hastings is absent from this novel; here, his shoes are filled by thirty-two-year-old Scotland Yard policeman Edward Catchpool, who, like Hastings, serves as the first-person narrator. Hannah has stated that she wanted to avoid reusing any of Christie's supporting cast.

== Commissioning by Agatha Christie estate ==
The Monogram Murders is the first original novel featuring Hercule Poirot to be commissioned by the Christie estate, more than thirty-eight years after Christie's death in 1976. It is the thirty-fourth novel to feature Poirot. Curtain, the last Poirot novel published by Christie, was published in 1975.
