= The Visitors Book =

- First editiong
- Author: Sophie Hannah
- Language: English
- Genre: Ghost stories
- Published: October 22, 2015, Sort of Books
- Publication place: United Kingdom
- Media type: Print (hardback and paperback)
- Pages: 96 pp (first edition, hardcover)
- ISBN: 1908745525
- Preceded by: Something Untoward: Six Tales of Domestic Terror

The Visitors Book (2015) is a collection of four ghost stories by Sophie Hannah, a British author and poet. Published by Sort of Books, the original edition's dimensions are comparatively small, and the pages have wide margins; it is stylized to appear like an actual visitors book - in keeping with the first, nominal story in the collection - with the inside cover and first page providing columns for names, addresses, comments, etc.

In promoting the book, Hannah described how the inspiration for the nominal story came from an incident where, visiting a friend at her home, she was asked to sign a visitors book, a request she found strange given the everyday surroundings.

== Stories ==
=== The Visitors Book ===
A young woman's boyfriend calls her a snob when she questions the validity of him owning a visitors book, as he lives in an average terraced house. Flicking through the book, the comments left don't seem to match the surroundings.

=== The Last Boy to Leave ===
After holding a birthday party for her son in the family's new house, an exhausted mother is preparing to relax when she notices that one child still hasn't been picked up.

=== Justified True Belief ===
A woman is stunned when, stopping her car at a red light, she sees what she knows against logic to be a ghost. Relating the story to her incredulous partner, she's prepared to dismiss the experience when she sees another ghost.

=== All the Dead Mothers of My Daughter's Friends ===
Waiting outside school gates to collect her daughter, a woman is approached by a mother who laughs and bemoans the other mothers with her. The conversation draws the woman into a web of cruelty and hatred.
