= Edward Ellis (actor) =

American actor, producer, screenwriter (1870–1952)

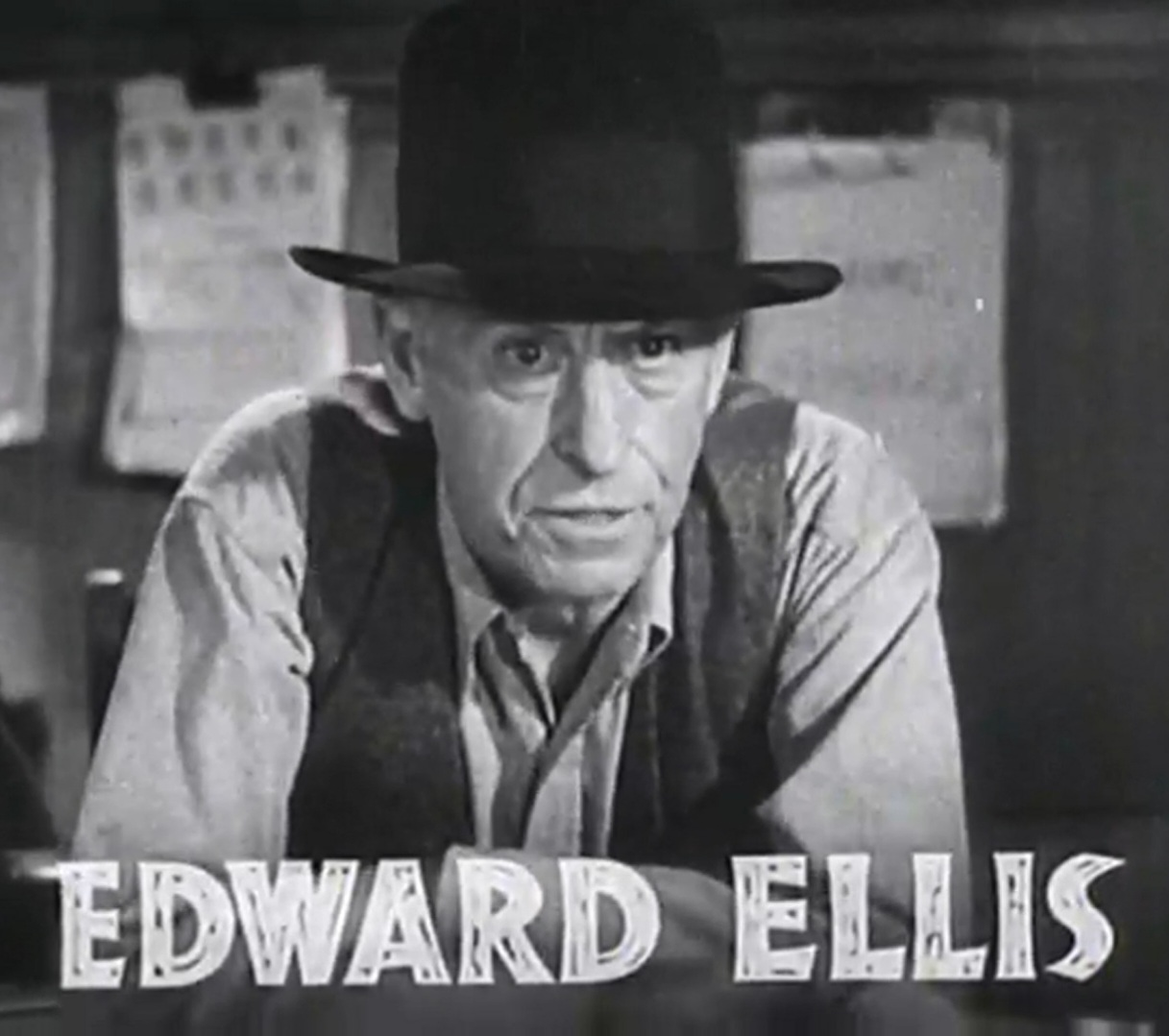
- Ellis in the trailer for Fury (1936)
- Born: Edward Mayne Ellis; November 12, 1870; Coldwater, Michigan, U.S.
- Died: July 26, 1952 (aged 81); Beverly Hills, California, U.S.
- Occupations: Actor; producer; screenwriter
- Years active: 1879–1942
- Spouse: Josephine Stevens (m. 1917, divorced)
- Children: 1
- Relatives: Edith Ellis (older sister)

Edward Mayne Ellis (November 12, 1870 – July 26, 1952) was an American actor. He played the title role in The Thin Man, as well as in A Man to Remember.

== Career ==
He made his first stage appearance in 1879 in Chicago. He was an actor, playwright and producer on Broadway before going into films. His first adult performance was in Mary and John in 1905. He toured all over America and also played in England. Edward Ellis was a dramatic author and also wrote the playscript for the 1934 play Affair of a Gentleman.

In films, he played mostly supporting roles, his only leading roles being in Main Street Lawyer (1939) and in A Man to Remember (1938) and Three Sons (1939), a remake of Lionel Barrymore's Sweepings (1933). He starred in 37 films, but is probably best remembered for his roles as the resolute sheriff in Fury, as Shirley Temple's uncle in Little Miss Broadway and the leading role in A Man to Remember.

In 1939, Frank Capra offered Ellis the role of the President of the Senate in Mr. Smith Goes To Washington, however he refused the part which went to Harry Carey.

== Personal life ==
He was briefly married to silent film actress Josephine Stevens from 1917 to the mid-1920s. Their union produced one daughter, Ruth Helen Ellis born in 1918.

== Partial filmography ==
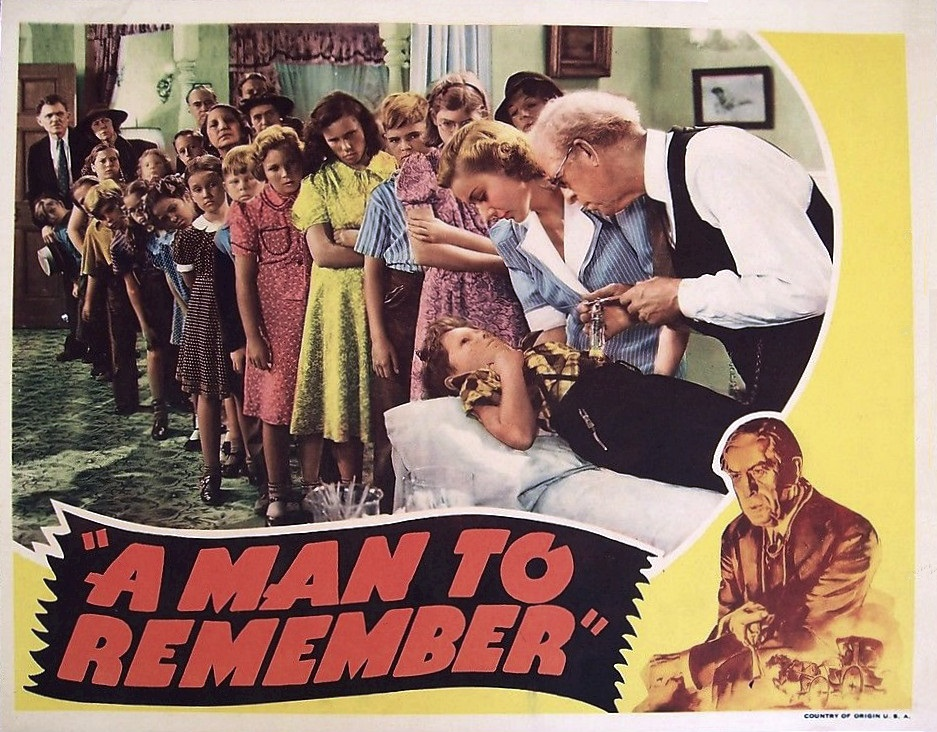
Lobby card for A Man to Remember (1938)

- The Law That Failed (1917) - Luke Rodin
- The Great Bradley Mystery (1917) - Bradley
- The Delicious Little Devil (1919) - Detective (uncredited)
- Out Yonder (1919) - Joey Clark
- Frontier of the Stars (1921) - Gregory
- I Am a Fugitive from a Chain Gang (1932) - Bomber Wells
- Girl Missing (1933) - Inspector McDonald
- Strictly Personal (1933) - Soapy Gibson
- After Tonight (1933) - Maj. Lieber
- From Headquarters (1933) - Dr. Van de Water
- Hi, Nellie! (1934) - O'Connell
- The Ninth Guest (1934) - Tim Cronin
- The Trumpet Blows (1934) - Chato
- The Last Gentleman (1934) - Claude
- The Thin Man (1934) - Clyde Wynant
- The President Vanishes (1934) - Lincoln Lee
- Transient Lady (1935) - Nick Kiley
- Village Tale (1935) - Old Ike
- Wanderer of the Wasteland (1935) - Dismukes
- The Return of Peter Grimm (1935) - Dr. Andrew Macpherson
- Chatterbox (1936) - Uriah Lowell
- Winterset (1936) - Jim Talbot
- Fury (1936) - Sheriff
- The Texas Rangers (1936) - Major Bailey
- The Lady Consents (1936) - Judge Gaunt
- Maid of Salem (1937) - Elder Goode
- Let Them Live (1937) - Pete Lindsey
- The Man in Blue (1937) - Martin Dunne
- Midnight Madonna (1937) - Judge Clark
- Little Miss Broadway (1938) - Pop Shea
- A Man to Remember (1938) - Dr. John Abbott
- Man of Conquest (1939) - Andrew Jackson
- Career (1939) - Stephen Cruthers
- Three Sons (1939) - Daniel Pardway
- Main Street Lawyer (1939) - Abraham Lincoln 'Link' Boggs
- A Man Betrayed (1941) - Tom Cameron aka Boss Cameron
- Steel Against the Sky (1941) - Pop Aloysius Evans
- The Omaha Trail (1942) - Mr. Vane (final film role)
