= Career (1939 film) =

1939 American film directed by Leigh Jason

- US film poster
- Directed by: Leigh Jason
- Written by: Dalton Trumbo; Bert Granet
- Produced by: Robert Sisk; Lee S. Marcus
- Starring: Anne Shirley; Edward Ellis; Janet Beecher
- Cinematography: Frank Redman
- Edited by: Arthur E. Redman
- Music by: Roy Webb; Robert Russell Bennett (uncredited)
- Production company: RKO Radio Pictures
- Distributed by: RKO Radio Pictures
- Release date: July 7, 1939
- Running time: 80 minutes
- Country: United States
- Language: English

Career is a 1939 American drama film directed by Leigh Jason and starring Anne Shirley, Edward Ellis and Janet Beecher. The screenplay was written by Dalton Trumbo and Bert Granet, with cinematography by Frank Redman. The film was distributed by RKO Radio Pictures.

== Plot ==
A rivalry between two men who are in love with the same girl.

== Cast ==
- Anne Shirley as Sylvia Bartholomew
- Edward Ellis as Stephen Cruthers
- Samuel S. Hinds as Clem Bartholomew
- Janet Beecher as Mrs. Amy Cruthers
- Leon Errol as Mudcat
- Rowena Cook as Merta Katz
- John Archer as Ray Cruthers
- Raymond Hatton as Deacon
- Hobart Cavanaugh as Jim Bronson
- Adrian Morris as Irate Bank Customer
