= Central Park (1932 film) =

1932 film

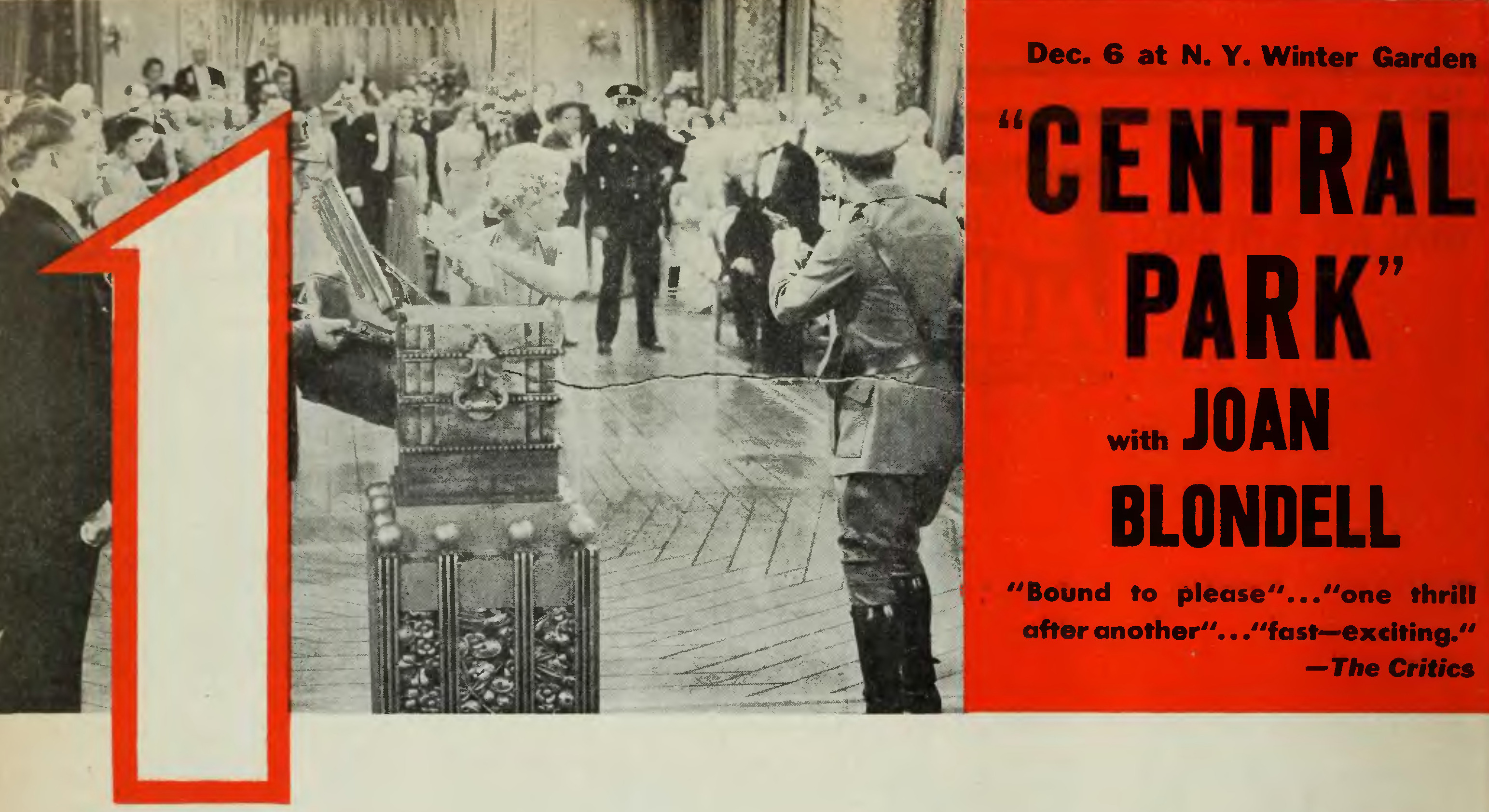
- 1932 advertisement
- Directed by: John G. Adolfi
- Written by: Ward Morehouse; Earl Baldwin
- Starring: Joan Blondell; Wallace Ford
- Cinematography: Sidney Hickox
- Edited by: Herbert Levy
- Music by: Leo F. Forbstein; Ray Heindorf
- Production company: First National Pictures
- Distributed by: Warner Bros. Pictures
- Release date: December 10, 1932
- Running time: 57 minutes
- Country: United States
- Language: English

Central Park is a 1932 United States pre-Code feature-length crime drama film directed by John G. Adolfi. This rarely seen film stars Wallace Ford and Joan Blondell and exists in a nitrate print at the Library of Congress. It has seen a DVD release by Teakwood Video.

== Plot ==
Two destitute New Yorkers meet in Central Park to then get separated after getting involved with some gangsters. The gangsters pose as police officers to make money. The two New Yorkers are reunited in the end.

== Cast ==
- Joan Blondell as Dot
- Wallace Ford as Rick
- Guy Kibbee as Policeman Charlie Cabot
- Henry B. Walthall as Eby
- John Wray as Robert Smiley
- Harold Huber as Nick Sarno
- Lee Shumway as Al (uncredited)
- Larry Steers as Headwaiter (uncredited)
