= The Mystery of Three Quarters =

2018 Poirot novel by Sophie Hannah

- Author: Sophie Hannah
- Language: English
- Series: Hercule Poirot
- Genre: Detective, mystery
- Published: August 23, 2018 HarperCollins
- Publication place: United Kingdom
- Media type: Print (hardback and paperback)
- Pages: 400 pp (first edition, hardcover)
- ISBN: 978-0008264451
- Preceded by: Closed Casket
- Followed by: The Killings at Kingfisher Hill

The Mystery of Three Quarters is a work of detective fiction by Sophie Hannah. It is the third in her series of Hercule Poirot novels, after being authorised by the estate of Agatha Christie to write new stories for the character. The previous two are The Monogram Murders (2014) and Closed Casket (2016).

== Plot ==
Four people receive letters purporting to be from Hercule Poirot and accusing them each of the murder of Barnabas Pandy, a ninety-something businessman who drowned - accidentally, it seems - in his bath. Poirot has no knowledge of the letters, nor yet of the late Barnabas Pandy, until he is accosted by one of the recipients, society woman Sylvia Rule, before finding another, market trader John McCrodden, in his drawing room. As he begins to investigate the source of the letters with assistance from his young friend Edward Catchpool, a Scotland Yard detective, he comes into contact with the family of Pandy, which seems to be hiding secrets.

== Explanation of the novel's title ==
Poirot refers to the case as "the mystery of three quarters" because, of the four people who received letters purporting to be from him, three are in some way connected to the late Barnabas Pandy, whose murder the letters accuse each one of committing. The fourth, however, is seemingly unconnected. Poirot, then, must figure out the relevance of the fourth person, or quarter. To symbolise the four quarters Poirot uses a slice of Battenberg cake, whose fourth square is separated from the other three.

== Characters ==
=== Main characters ===
- Hercule Poirot, private detective
- Edward Catchpool, inspector from Scotland Yard

=== Recipients of the letters ===
- Hugo Dockerill, housemaster to Pandy's great-grandson
- John McCrodden, seemingly unconnected to Pandy
- Sylvia Rule, mother of a boy in the same school house as Pandy's great-grandson
- Annabel Treadway, Barnabas Pandy's granddaughter

=== Other characters ===
- Kingsbury, Pandy's butler and closest friend
- Ivy Lavington, Treadway's niece
- Lenore Lavington, Ivy's mother
- Timothy Lavington, Lenore's son
- Rowland "Rope" McCrodden, John's father, a solicitor nicknamed "Rowland Rope" due to his preference for capital punishment
- Freddy Rule, Sylvia's son and Timothy's classmate
- Mildred Rule, Sylvia's daughter
