= Harold Huber =

American actor (1909–1959)

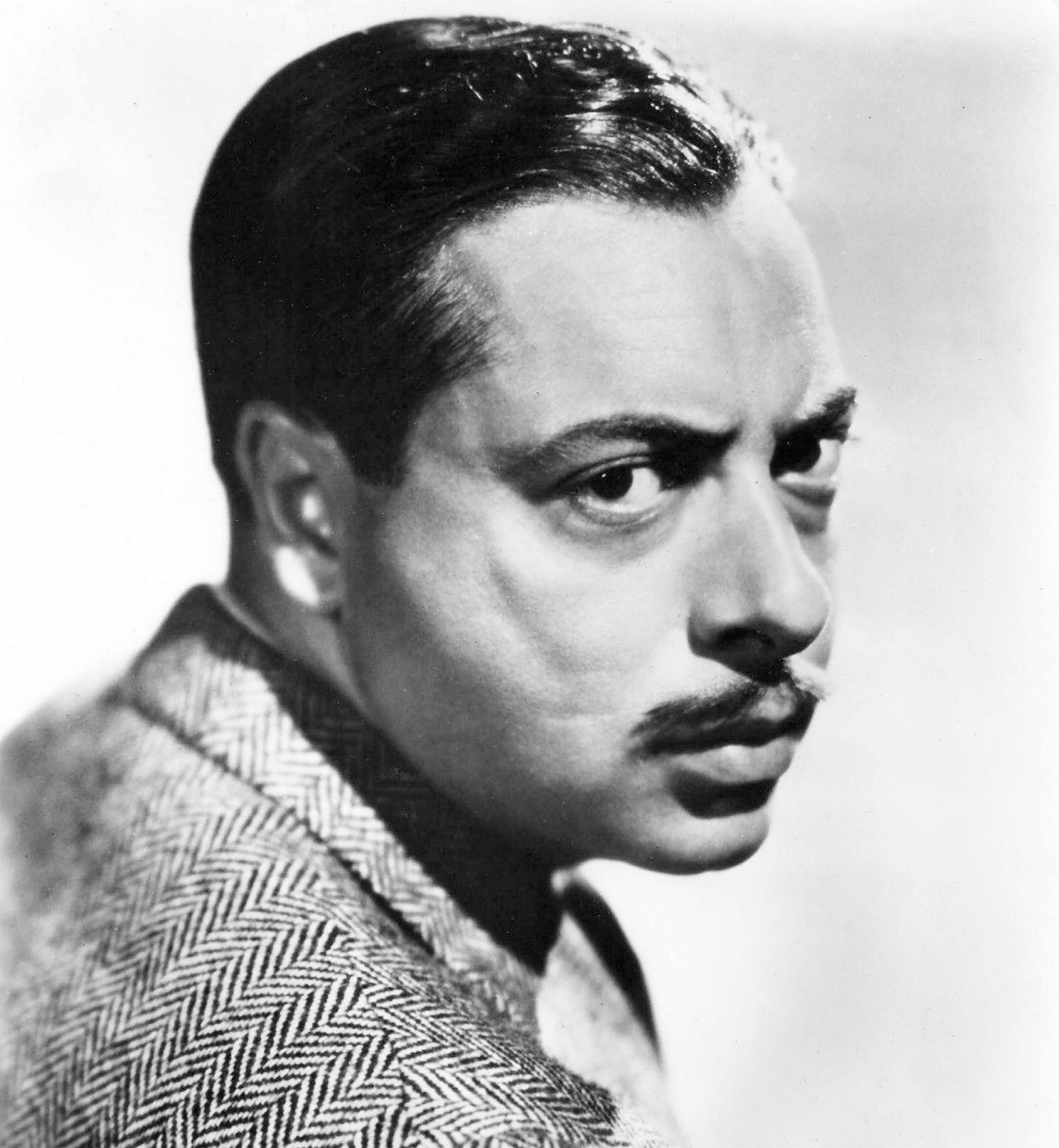
- Huber in 1951.
- Born: Harold Joseph Huberman; December 5, 1909; New York City, U.S.
- Died: September 29, 1959 (aged 49); New York City, U.S.
- Resting place: Mount Hebron Cemetery in Queens
- Education: New York University; Columbia Law School
- Occupation: Actor
- Years active: 1930–1959
- Spouse: Ethel Huber
- Children: 1

Harold Huber (born Harold Joseph Huberman, December 5, 1909 – September 29, 1959) was an American actor who appeared on film, radio and television.

== Early life ==
Huber was born in the Bronx to Jewish immigrants from Imperial Russia, who had arrived in the United States as infants. His father was the manager of an optical firm. Harold Huberman entered New York University in the fall of 1925 at age sixteen. He was a member of the university debate team, and by his third year had become editor of a school magazine called The Medley. His tenure at that post was marked by an incident, reported in the newspapers, when the administration suspended publication of The Medley in May 1928 for printing "low humor...not fit to bear the name of New York University".

After graduating from NYU in 1929, Huberman attended Columbia University for a short time, reportedly in the School of Law, but apparently dropped out after getting his first acting job in 1930.

== Career ==
=== Stage ===
On September 22, 1930, Harold Huberman became Harold Huber, for a Broadway adaption of A Farewell to Arms. This first acting job lasted a month. He also appeared in the Broadway productions The Assassin (1945), Merry-Go-Round (1932), Two Seconds (1931), and First Night (1930) before landing roles in some Warner Bros. films shot on location in New York.

=== Film ===
Huber made his film debut in Central Park in late 1932, followed quickly by a bit part in 20,000 Years in Sing Sing. He appeared in nearly 100 films in the 1930s and 1940s. An early noteworthy role was as the stool-pigeon Nunnheim in The Thin Man (1934). He played many roles requiring him to assume different accents, like Ito Nakamura, a Japanese American in the 1942 film Little Tokyo, U.S.A.. Among his many roles were appearances as a police officer in various Charlie Chan films, including an American in Charlie Chan on Broadway (1937), a French officer in Charlie Chan at Monte Carlo (1937) and Charlie Chan in City in Darkness (1939), and a Brazilian in Charlie Chan in Rio (1941). He played a supporting role as a member of the French Foreign Legion in Beau Geste (1939). He also played roles in films featuring Mr. Moto and Charlie McCarthy.

=== Radio ===
Huber starred as Hercule Poirot in The Adventures of M. Hercule Poirot in a weekly half-hour program from February to October, 1945 (the program is also cited as being titled simply Hercule Poirot or Agatha Christie's Poirot). Agatha Christie introduced the initial broadcast of the series via shortwave radio. In October 1946, Huber began a year-long run on radio as Poirot in a daily fifteen-minute program on CBS, called Mystery of the Week, with scripts by Alfred Bester. Huber also portrayed Fu Manchu on radio in an eponymous program.

=== Television ===
Huber's television debut came in 1950, as the star of a weekly half-hour drama, I Cover Times Square, on ABC. He played Johnny Warren, a nationally known newspaper and radio columnist. Huber also produced the New York-made show, which lasted only one season.

== Final roles ==
In September 1958, Huber co-starred with Eva Gabor in a short-lived off-Broadway revival of Frank Wedekind's play Lulu, his last stage credit. That same year he was cast in two episodes of the hit TV comedy series The Phil Silvers Show, aired in November 1958 and February 1959, respectively.

== Personal life ==
Huber died during surgery at Jewish Memorial Hospital on September 29, 1959, leaving behind his wife Ethel and daughter Margaret. He was buried at Mount Hebron Cemetery in Queens.

== Selected filmography ==
- The Criminal Code (1930) - Convict in Yard (uncredited)
- Central Park (1932) - Nick Sarno
- 20,000 Years in Sing Sing (1932) - Tony - Death Row Convict (uncredited)
- Frisco Jenny (1932) - Weaver
- The Match King (1932) - Scarlatti
- Parachute Jumper (1933) - Steve Donovan
- Ladies They Talk About (1933) - Lefty Simons
- Girl Missing (1933) - Jim Hendricks
- Central Airport (1933) - Swarthy Man (scenes deleted)
- The Life of Jimmy Dolan (1933) - Reggie Newman
- The Silk Express (1933) - Train Guard Craft
- The Mayor of Hell (1933) - Joe
- Midnight Mary (1933) - Puggy
- Mary Stevens, M.D. (1933) - Tony
- Police Car 17 (1933) - Johnny Davis
- The Bowery (1933) - Slick (uncredited)
- Fury of the Jungle (1933) - Gaston Labelle aka Frenchy
- Hi, Nellie! (1934) - Leo
- No More Women (1934) - Iceberg
- The Crosby Case (1934) - Rogers (uncredited)
- The Line-Up (1934) - 'Mile-a-Way' Miller
- A Very Honorable Guy (1934) - Joe Ponzetti
- He Was Her Man (1934) - J.C. Ward, Curly's Hitman
- The Thin Man (1934) - Nunheim
- The Merry Frinks (1934) - Benny Lopez
- The Defense Rests (1934) - Castro
- Beyond the Law (1934) - Gordon
- Hide-Out (1934) - Dr. Warner
- Port of Lost Dreams (1934) - Louis Constolos
- Cheating Cheaters (1934) - Edgar 'Legs' Finelli
- The World Accuses (1934) - 'Checkers' Fraley
- Forsaking All Others (1934) - Mr. Frankenstein - Hamburger Stand Owner (uncredited)
- One New York Night (1935) - Blake
- Naughty Marietta (1935) - Abe
- G Men (1935) - Venke
- Reckless (1935) - Nick Londos (uncredited)
- Mad Love (1935) - Thief (scenes deleted)
- Pursuit (1935) - Jake
- I Live My Life (1935) - Picture Hanger (uncredited)
- We're Only Human (1935) - Tony Ricci (uncredited)
- Muss 'em Up (1936) - Maratti
- Klondike Annie (1936) - Chan Lo
- San Francisco (1936) - Babe
- Kelly the Second (1936) - Spike
- Women Are Trouble (1936) - Pete the Pusher
- The Devil Is a Sissy (1936) - Willie
- The Gay Desperado (1936) - Juan Campo
- They Gave Him a Gun (1937)
- The Good Earth (1937) - Cousin
- Trouble in Morocco (1937) - Palmo
- Midnight Taxi (1937) - Walter 'Lucky' Todd
- Angel's Holiday (1937) - Bat Regan
- You Can't Beat Love (1937) - Pretty Boy Jones
- Outlaws of the Orient (1937) - Bandit General Ho-Fang
- Love Under Fire (1937) - Lieutenant Chaves
- Charlie Chan on Broadway (1937) - Inspector Nelson
- Charlie Chan at Monte Carlo (1937) - Jules Joubert
- International Settlement (1938) - Joseph Lang
- A Slight Case of Murder (1938) - Giuseppe
- Mr. Moto's Gamble (1938) - Lieutenant Riggs
- The Adventures of Marco Polo (1938) - Toctai
- A Trip to Paris (1938) - Willie Jones
- Gangs of New York (1938) - Panatella
- Passport Husband (1938) - Blackie Bennet
- Mysterious Mr. Moto (1938) - Ernst Litmar
- Little Tough Guys in Society (1938) - Uncle Buck
- While New York Sleeps (1938) - Joe Marco
- Going Places (1938) - Maxie
- Midnight Mary (1939)
- King of the Turf (1939) - Santelli
- You Can't Get Away with Murder (1939) - Tom Scappa
- The Lady and the Mob (1939) - Harry the Lug
- Chasing Danger (1939) - Carlos Demitri
- 6,000 Enemies (1939) - Joe Silenus
- Beau Geste (1939) - Voisin
- Main Street Lawyer (1939) - Tony Marco
- Charlie Chan in City in Darkness (1939) - Marcel
- Charlie McCarthy, Detective (1939) - Tony Garcia
- The Ghost Comes Home (1940) - Tony
- Kit Carson (1940) - Lopez
- Dance, Girl, Dance (1940) - Hoboken Gent
- A Man Betrayed (1941) - Morris Slade
- Country Fair (1941) - Cash Nichols
- Charlie Chan in Rio (1941) - Chief Souto
- Down Mexico Way (1941) - Pancho Grande
- Pardon My Stripes (1942) - Big George Kilraine
- Sleepytime Gal (1942) - Honest Joe Kincaid
- A Gentleman After Dark (1942) - S. Jenkins (Stubby)
- Little Tokyo, U.S.A. (1942) - Ito Takimura
- Manila Calling (1942) - Santoro
- Lady from Chungking (1942) - Gen. Kaimura
- Ice-Capades Revue (1942) - Duke Baldwin
- Crime Doctor (1943) - Joe Dylan
- My Friend Irma Goes West (1950) - Pete
- Let's Dance (1950) - Marcel
- The Joker Is Wild (1957) - Harry Bliss (uncredited)

== Radio appearances ==
| Year | Program | Episode/source |
|---|---|---|
| 1952 | The FBI in Peace and War | The Trouble Shooter |
