= Hercule Poirot =

Fictional detective created by Agatha Christie

- Albert Finney as Poirot in the 1974 film Murder on the Orient Express
- First appearance: The Mysterious Affair at Styles; (1920)
- Last appearance: Curtain (1975, by Agatha Christie)
- Created by: Agatha Christie
- Portrayed by: Charles Laughton; Francis L. Sullivan; Austin Trevor; Orson Welles; Harold Huber; Richard Williams; John Malkovich; José Ferrer; Martin Gabel; Tony Randall; Albert Finney; Peter Ustinov; Ian Holm; David Suchet; John Moffatt; Maurice Denham; Ronnie Barker; Peter Sallis; Konstantin Raikin; Alfred Molina; Robert Powell; Jason Durr; Kenneth Branagh; Anthony O'Donnell; Shirō Itō (Takashi Akafuji); Mansai Nomura (Takeru Suguro); Tom Conti; Pál Mácsai; Peter Dinklage; Edward Bluemel
- Voiced by: Kōtarō Satomi

In-universe information
- Gender: Male
- Occupation: Private investigator Police officer (formerly)
- Family: Jules-Louis Poirot (father); Godelieve Poirot (mother)
- Religion: Catholic
- Nationality: Belgian

Hercule Poirot (UK: /ˈɛərkjuːl ˈpwɑːroʊ/, US: /hɜːrˈkjuːl pwɑːˈroʊ/, French: [ɛʁkyl pwaʁo]) is a recurring fictional Belgian detective created by the English writer Agatha Christie. Poirot is Christie's most famous and longest-running character, appearing in 33 novels (starting with The Mysterious Affair at Styles), two plays (Black Coffee and Alibi) and 51 short stories published between 1920 and 1975.

Poirot is noted for his distinctive appearance, including his waxed moustache and fastidious dress, as well as for his reliance on logic, psychology, and what he terms his "little grey cells" to solve cases.

The character's biography is developed gradually across Christie's works. He is introduced as a former Belgian police officer living in England as a refugee following the First World War. Poirot is portrayed as dignified, meticulous, and occasionally vain, traits that sometimes serve as comic devices but also reflect his precise and methodical approach to detection. His final appearance is in Curtain: Poirot's Last Case.

Poirot has become one of the most recognisable figures in detective fiction and has been widely adapted in other media. He has been portrayed by numerous actors in film, television, stage, and radio, including David Suchet, John Moffatt, Peter Ustinov, and Kenneth Branagh. The character has also appeared in continuation novels authorised by the Christie estate, written by Sophie Hannah from 2014 onwards.

== Overview ==
=== Influences ===
Poirot's name was derived from two other fictional detectives of the time: Marie Belloc Lowndes's Hercules Popeau and Frank Howel Evans's Monsieur Poiret, a retired French police officer living in London. Evans's Jules Poiret "was small and rather heavyset, hardly more than five feet, but moved with his head held high. The most remarkable features of his head were the stiff military moustache. His apparel was neat to perfection, a little quaint and frankly dandified." He was accompanied by Captain Harry Haven, who had returned to London from a Colombian business venture ended by a civil war.

A more obvious influence on the early Poirot stories is that of Arthur Conan Doyle. In An Autobiography Christie states, "I was still writing in the Sherlock Holmes tradition – eccentric detective, stooge assistant, with a Lestrade-type Scotland Yard detective, Inspector Japp". (Note: Reproduced as the "Introduction" to 2013 Hercule Poirot: The Complete Short Stories: A Hercule Poirot Collection with Foreword by Charles Todd) Conan Doyle acknowledged basing his detective stories on the model of Edgar Allan Poe's C. Auguste Dupin and his anonymous narrator, and basing his character Sherlock Holmes on Joseph Bell, who in his use of "ratiocination" prefigured Poirot's reliance on his "little grey cells". Poirot also bears a striking resemblance to A. E. W. Mason's fictional detective Inspector Hanaud of the French Sûreté, who first appeared in the 1910 novel At the Villa Rose and predates the first Poirot novel by 10 years.

Christie's Poirot was clearly the result of her early development of the detective in her first book, written in 1916 and published in 1920. The large number of refugees in the country who had fled the German invasion of Belgium in August to November 1914 served as a plausible explanation of why such a skilled detective would be available to solve mysteries at an English country house. At the time of Christie's writing, it was considered patriotic to express sympathy towards the Belgians, since the invasion of their country had constituted Britain's casus belli for entering World War I, and British wartime propaganda emphasised the "Rape of Belgium".

=== Popularity ===
Poirot first appeared in The Mysterious Affair at Styles, published in 1920, and exited in Curtain, published in 1975. Following the latter, Poirot was the only fictional character to receive an obituary on the front page of The New York Times.

By 1930, Christie found Poirot "insufferable"; by 1960, she felt that Poirot was a "detestable, bombastic, tiresome, ego-centric little creep". Despite this, Poirot remained an exceedingly popular character with the general public. Christie later stated that she refused to kill him off, claiming it was her duty to produce what the public liked.

=== Appearance and proclivities ===
The original 1924 edition of Poirot Investigates, reusing W. Smithson Broadhead's illustration of the character from 1923.

Captain Arthur Hastings's first description of Poirot:

He was hardly more than five feet four inches but carried himself with great dignity. His head was exactly the shape of an egg, and he always perched it a little on one side. His moustache was very stiff and military. Even if everything on his face was covered, the tips of moustache and the pink-tipped nose would be visible. The neatness of his attire was almost incredible; I believe a speck of dust would have caused him more pain than a bullet wound. Yet this quaint dandified little man who, I was sorry to see, now limped badly, had been in his time one of the most celebrated members of the Belgian police.

Christie's initial description of Poirot in Murder on the Orient Express was that of "a small man [Hercule Poirot] muffled up to the ears of whom nothing was visible but a pink-tipped nose and the two points of an upward-curled moustache."

In the later books, his limp is not mentioned, suggesting it may have been a temporary wartime injury. (In Curtain, Poirot admits he was wounded when he first came to England.) Poirot has green eyes that are repeatedly described as shining "like a cat's" when he is struck by a clever idea, and dark hair, which he dyes later in life. In Curtain, he admits to Hastings that he has taken to wearing a wig and a false moustache. However, in many of his screen and stage incarnations, he is bald or balding.

Frequent mention is made of his patent leather shoes, damage to which is frequently a source of misery for him, but comical for the reader. Poirot's appearance, regarded as fastidious during his early career, later falls hopelessly out of fashion.

He suffers from sea sickness, and in Death in the Clouds he states that his air sickness prevents him from being more alert at the time of the murder. Later in his life, we are told: "Always a man who had taken his stomach seriously, he was reaping his reward in old age. Eating was not only a physical pleasure, it was also an intellectual research."

Poirot is extremely punctual and carries a pocket watch almost to the end of his career. He is also particular about his personal finances, preferring to keep a bank balance of 444 pounds, 4 shillings, and 4 pence. The actor David Suchet, who portrayed Poirot on television, said "there's no question he's obsessive-compulsive". The filmmaker Kenneth Branagh said that he "enjoyed finding the sort of obsessive-compulsive" in Poirot.

As mentioned in Curtain and The Clocks, he is fond of classical music, particularly that of Wolfgang Amadeus Mozart and Johann Sebastian Bach.

=== Methods ===
In The Mysterious Affair at Styles Poirot operates as a fairly conventional, clue-based and logical detective; reflected in his vocabulary by two common phrases: his use of "the little grey cells" and "order and method". Hastings is irritated by the fact that Poirot sometimes conceals important details of his plans, as in The Big Four. In this novel, Hastings is kept in the dark throughout the climax. This aspect of Poirot is less evident in the later novels, partly because there is rarely a narrator to mislead.

In Murder on the Links, still largely dependent on clues himself, Poirot's approach is contrasted with a "bloodhound" detective who focuses on the traditional trail of clues established in detective fiction. From this point on, Poirot establishes his psychological bona fides. Rather than painstakingly examining crime scenes, he enquires into the nature of the victim or the psychology of the murderer. He predicates his actions in the later novels on his underlying assumption that particular crimes are committed by particular types of people.

Poirot focuses on getting people to talk. In the early novels he casts himself in the role of "Papa Poirot", a benign confessor, especially to young women. In later works Christie made a point of having Poirot supply false or misleading information about himself or his background to assist him in obtaining information. In The Murder of Roger Ackroyd, Poirot speaks of a non-existent mentally disabled nephew to uncover information about homes for the mentally unfit. In Dumb Witness, Poirot invents an elderly invalid mother as a pretence to investigate local nurses. In The Big Four, Poirot pretends to have (and poses as) an identical twin brother named Achille.

Poirot is also willing to appear more foreign and vain in an effort to make people underestimate him. He admits that he "can speak the exact, the idiomatic English. But... to speak the broken English is an enormous asset. It leads people to despise you. They say – a foreigner – he can't even speak English properly. ... Also I boast! An Englishman he says often, 'A fellow who thinks as much of himself as that cannot be worth much.' ... And so, you see, I put people off their guard."

He also has a tendency to refer to himself in the third person.

In later novels Christie often uses the word mountebank when characters describe Poirot, showing that he has successfully passed himself off as a charlatan or fraud.

Poirot's investigating techniques assist him solving cases; "For in the long run, either through a lie, or through truth, people were bound to give themselves away..." At the end Poirot usually reveals his description of the sequence of events and his deductions to a room of suspects, often leading to the culprit's apprehension.

== Life ==
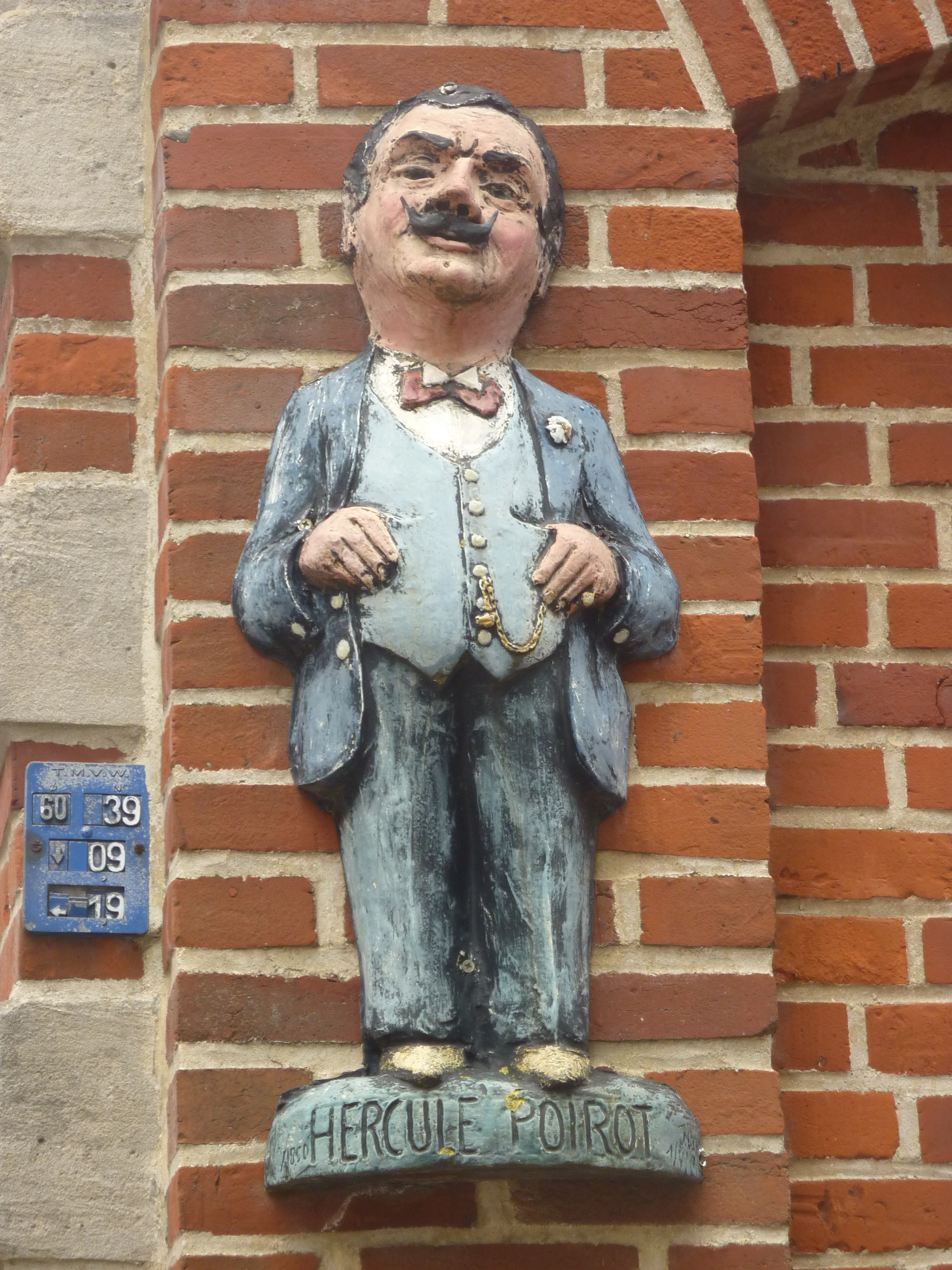
A statuette of Poirot in Ellezelles, Belgium

=== Origins ===
Christie was purposely vague about Poirot's origins, as he is thought to be an elderly man even in the early novels. In An Autobiography, she admitted that she already imagined him to be an old man in 1920. At the time, however, she did not know that she would write works featuring him for decades to come.

A brief passage in The Big Four provides original information about Poirot's birth or at least childhood in or near the town of Spa, Belgium: "But we did not go into Spa itself. We left the main road and wound into the leafy fastnesses of the hills, till we reached a little hamlet and an isolated white villa high on the hillside." Christie strongly implies that this "quiet retreat in the Ardennes" near Spa is the location of the Poirot family home.

An alternative tradition holds that Poirot was born in the village of Ellezelles (province of Hainaut, Belgium). A few memorials dedicated to Hercule Poirot can be seen in the centre of this village. There appears to be no reference to this in Christie's writings, but the town of Ellezelles cherishes a copy of Poirot's birth certificate in a local memorial 'attesting' Poirot's birth, naming his father and mother as Jules-Louis Poirot and Godelieve Poirot.

Christie wrote that Poirot is a Catholic by birth, but not much is described about his later religious convictions, except sporadic references to his "going to church" and occasional invocations of "le bon Dieu". (Note: In Taken at the Flood, Book II, Chapter 6 Poirot goes into the church to pray and happens across a suspect with whom he briefly discusses ideas of sin and confession.) Christie provides little information regarding Poirot's childhood, only mentioning in Three Act Tragedy that he comes from a large family with little wealth, and has at least one younger sister. Apart from French and English, Poirot is also fluent in German.

=== Policeman ===
Hercule Poirot was active in the Brussels police force by 1893. Very little mention is made about this part of his life, but in "The Nemean Lion" (1939) Poirot refers to a Belgian case of his in which "a wealthy soap manufacturer ... poisoned his wife in order to be free to marry his secretary". As Poirot was often misleading about his past to gain information, the truthfulness of that statement is unknown; it does, however, scare off a would-be wife-killer.

In the short story "The Chocolate Box" (1923), Poirot reveals to Captain Arthur Hastings an account of what he considers to be his only failure. Poirot admits that he has failed to solve a crime "innumerable" times: "I have been called in too late. Very often another, working towards the same goal, has arrived there first. Twice I have been struck down with illness just as I was on the point of success.

Nevertheless, he regards the 1893 case in "The Chocolate Box", (Note: The date is given in 1932 Peril at End House) as his only failure through his fault only.

Again, Poirot is not reliable as a narrator of his personal history and there is no evidence that Christie sketched it out in any depth. During his police career, Poirot shot a man who was firing from a roof into the public below. In Lord Edgware Dies, Poirot reveals that he learned to read writing upside down during his police career. Around that time he met Xavier Bouc, director of the Compagnie Internationale des Wagons-Lits.

Inspector Japp offers some insight into Poirot's career with the Belgian police when introducing him to a colleague:

You've heard me speak of Mr. Poirot? It was in 1904 he and I worked together – the Abercrombie forgery case – you remember he was run down in Brussels. Ah, those were the days Moosier. Then, do you remember "Baron" Altara? There was a pretty rogue for you! He eluded the clutches of half the police in Europe. But we nailed him in Antwerp – thanks to Mr. Poirot here.

Poirot mentions that he was Chief of Police of Brussels, until "the Great War" (World War I) forced him to leave for England..

=== Private detective ===
During the First World War Poirot left Belgium for England as a refugee, although he returned a few times. On 16 July 1916 he again met his lifelong friend, Captain Arthur Hastings, and solved the first of his cases to be published, The Mysterious Affair at Styles. It is clear that Hastings and Poirot are already friends when they meet in Chapter 2 of the novel, as Hastings tells Cynthia that he has not seen him for "some years". Agatha Christie's Poirot has Hastings reveal that they met on a shooting case where Hastings was a suspect. (Note: Recounted in the short story The Kidnapped Prime Minister)

Particulars such as the date of 1916 for the case and that Hastings had met Poirot in Belgium, are given in Curtain, Chapter 1. After that case, Poirot apparently came to the attention of the British secret service and undertook cases for the British government, including foiling the attempted abduction of the prime minister. Readers were told that the British authorities had learned of Poirot's keen investigative ability from certain members of the Belgian royal family.

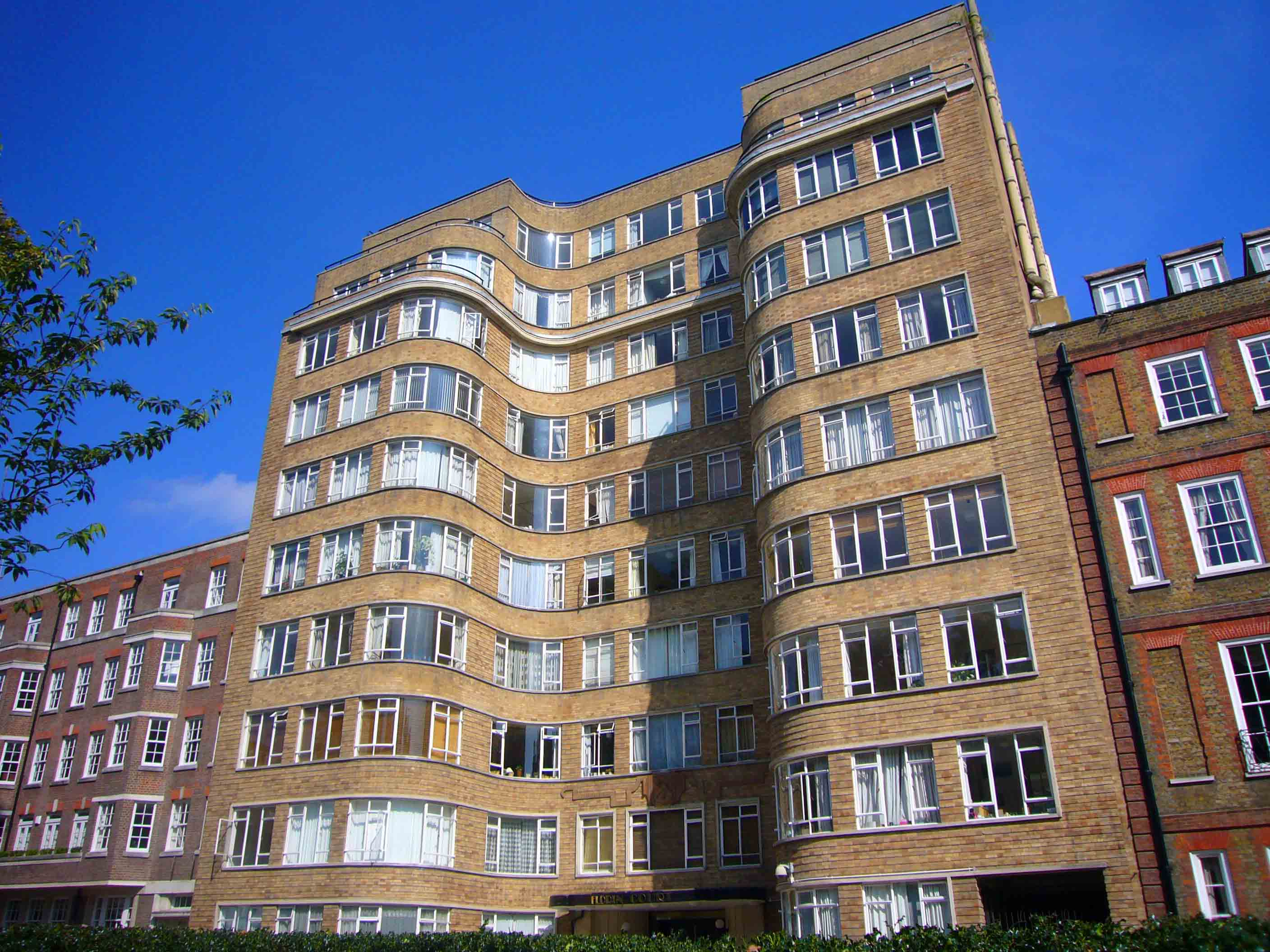
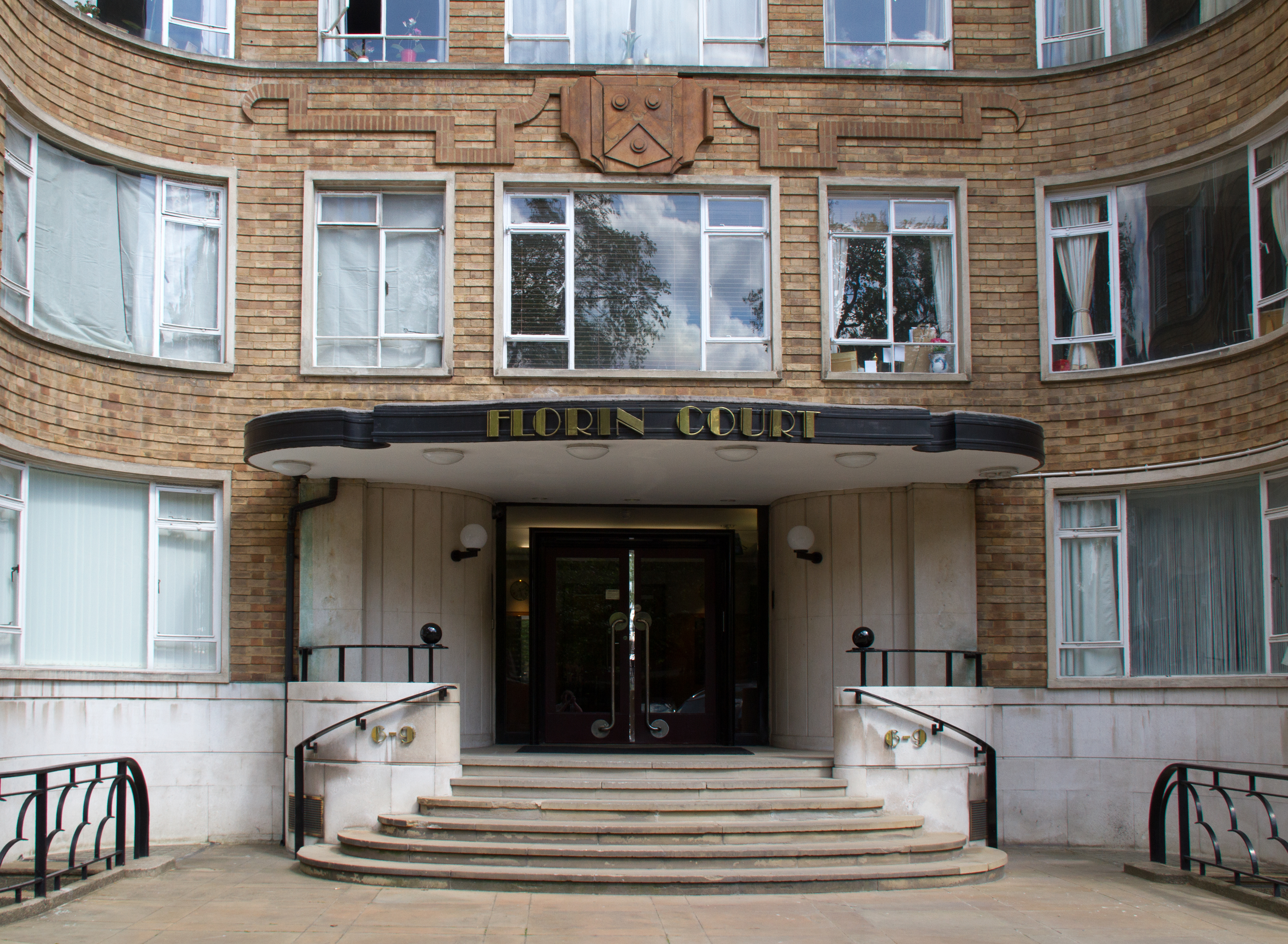
In the ITV series Agatha Christie's Poirot, Florin Court was used to represent "Whitehaven Mansions", Poirot's fictional apartment building.

After the war Poirot became a private detective and began undertaking civilian cases. He moved into what became both his home and work address, Flat 203 at 56B Whitehaven Mansions. Hastings first visits the flat when he returns to England in June 1935 from Argentina in The A.B.C. Murders, Chapter 1.

According to Hastings, it was chosen by Poirot "entirely on account of its strict geometrical appearance and proportion" and described as the "newest type of service flat". His first case in this period was "The Affair at the Victory Ball", which allowed Poirot to enter high society and begin his career as a private detective.

Between the world wars, Poirot travelled all over Europe and the Middle East investigating crimes and solving murders. Most of his cases occurred during this time, and he was at the height of his powers at this point in his life. In The Murder on the Links, the Belgian pits his grey cells against a French murderer. In the Middle East, he solved the cases Death on the Nile and Murder in Mesopotamia with ease, and even survived An Appointment with Death. As he passed through Eastern Europe on his return trip, he solved The Murder on the Orient Express.

It was during this time he met the Countess Vera Rossakoff, a glamorous jewel thief. The history of the countess is, like Poirot's, steeped in mystery. She claims to have been a member of the Russian aristocracy before the Russian Revolution and suffered greatly as a result, but how much of that story is true is an open question. Even Poirot acknowledges that Rossakoff offered wildly varying accounts of her early life. Poirot later became smitten with the woman and allowed her to escape justice.

Although letting the countess escape was morally questionable, it was not uncommon. In The Nemean Lion, Poirot sided with the criminal, Miss Amy Carnaby, allowing her to evade prosecution by blackmailing his client Sir Joseph Hoggins, who, Poirot discovered, had plans to commit murder. Poirot even sent Miss Carnaby two hundred pounds as a final payoff prior to the conclusion of her dog kidnapping campaign. In The Murder of Roger Ackroyd, Poirot allowed the murderer to escape justice through suicide and then withheld the truth to spare the feelings of the murderer's relatives.

In The Augean Stables he helped the government to cover up vast corruption. In Murder on the Orient Express, Poirot allowed the murderers to go free after discovering that twelve different people participated in the murder, each one stabbing the victim in a darkened carriage, after drugging him into unconsciousness so that there was no way for anyone to definitively determine which of them actually delivered the killing blow. The victim had committed a disgusting crime which led to the deaths of at least five people, and there was no question of his guilt, but he had been acquitted in America in a miscarriage of justice.

Considering it poetic justice that twelve jurors had acquitted him and twelve people had stabbed him, Poirot produced an alternative sequence of events to explain the death involving an unknown additional passenger on the train, with the medical examiner agreeing to doctor his own report to support this theory.

After his cases in the Middle East, Poirot returned to Britain. Apart from some of the so-called Labours of Hercules (see next section) he very rarely went abroad during his later career. He moved into Styles Court towards the end of his life.

While Poirot was usually paid handsomely by clients, he was also known to take on cases that piqued his curiosity, although they did not pay well.

=== Post–Second World War ===
Poirot is less active during the cases that take place at the end of his career. Beginning with Three Act Tragedy (1934), Christie had perfected during the inter-war years a subgenre of Poirot novel in which the detective himself spent much of the first third of the novel on the periphery of events. In novels such as Taken at the Flood, After the Funeral, and Hickory Dickory Dock, he is even less in evidence, frequently passing the duties of main interviewing detective to a subsidiary character. In Cat Among the Pigeons, Poirot's entrance is so late as to be almost an afterthought. Whether this was a reflection of his age or of Christie's distaste for him, is impossible to assess. Crooked House (1949) and Ordeal by Innocence (1957), which could easily have been Poirot novels, represent a logical endpoint of the general diminution of his presence in such works.

Towards the end of his career, it becomes clear that Poirot's retirement is no longer a convenient fiction. He assumes a genuinely inactive lifestyle during which he concerns himself with studying famous unsolved cases of the past and reading detective novels. He even writes a book about mystery fiction in which he deals sternly with Edgar Allan Poe and Wilkie Collins. In the absence of a more appropriate puzzle, he solves such inconsequential domestic riddles as the presence of three pieces of orange peel in his umbrella stand.

Poirot (and, it is reasonable to suppose, his creator) (Note: In The Pale Horse, Chapter 1, the novel's narrator, Mark Easterbrook, disapprovingly describes a typical "Chelsea girl") in much the same terms that Poirot uses in Chapter 1 of Third Girl, suggesting that the condemnation of fashion is authorial. becomes increasingly bemused by the vulgarism of the up-and-coming generation's young people. In Hickory Dickory Dock, he investigates the strange goings-on in a student hostel, while in Third Girl (1966) he is forced into contact with the smart set of Chelsea youths. In the growing drug and pop culture of the 1960s, he proves himself once again but has become heavily reliant on other investigators, especially the private investigator, Mr. Goby, who provide him with the clues that he can no longer gather for himself.

Notably, during this time his physical characteristics also change dramatically; by the time Arthur Hastings meets Poirot again in Curtain, he looks very different from his previous appearances, having become thin with age and with obviously dyed hair.

=== Death ===
In Curtain, Poirot himself became a murderer, in order to prevent further murders instigated by a man who manipulated others to kill for him, subtly and psychologically manipulating the moments where others desire to commit murder so that they carry out the crime when they might otherwise dismiss their thoughts as nothing more than a momentary passion. Poirot executed the man, as otherwise he would have continued his actions and never been convicted.

Poirot himself died shortly after committing murder. He had moved his amyl nitrite pills out of his own reach, possibly because of guilt. Poirot himself noted that he wanted to kill his victim shortly before his own death so that he could avoid succumbing to the arrogance of the murderer, concerned that he might come to view himself as entitled to kill those whom he deemed necessary to eliminate.

It is revealed at the end of Curtain that he fakes his need for a wheelchair to fool people into believing that he is suffering from arthritis, to give the impression that he is more infirm than he is. His last recorded words are "Cher ami!", spoken to Hastings as the Captain left his room. The TV adaptation adds that as Poirot is dying alone, he whispers out his final prayer to God in these words: "Forgive me... forgive...". Poirot was buried at Styles, and his funeral was arranged by his best friend Hastings and Hastings' daughter Judith. Hastings reasoned, "Here was the spot where he had lived when he first came to this country. He was to lie here at the last."

Poirot's actual death and funeral occurred in Curtain, years after his retirement from active investigation, but it was not the first time that Hastings attended the funeral of his best friend. In The Big Four (1927), Poirot feigned his death and subsequent funeral to launch a surprise attack on the Big Four.

== Recurring characters ==
=== Captain Arthur Hastings ===
Hastings, a former British Army officer, meets Poirot during Poirot's years as a police officer in Belgium and almost immediately after they both arrive in England. He becomes Poirot's lifelong friend, but only appears in eight of the Poirot novels and a number of short stories. He is completely absent from the series between 1937 and 1975.

Poirot regards Hastings as a poor private detective, not particularly intelligent, yet helpful in his way of being fooled by the criminal or seeing things the way the average man would see them and for his tendency to unknowingly "stumble" onto the truth. In the course of the series, Hastings marries and has four children – two sons and two daughters. As a loyal, albeit somewhat naïve companion, Hastings is to Poirot what Watson is to Sherlock Holmes.

Hastings is capable of great bravery and courage, facing death unflinchingly when confronted by The Big Four and displaying unwavering loyalty towards Poirot. However, when forced to choose between Poirot and his wife in that novel, he initially chooses to betray Poirot to protect his wife. Later, though, he tells Poirot to draw back and escape the trap.

The two are an airtight team until Hastings meets and marries Dulcie Duveen, a music hall performer half his age, after investigating the Murder on the Links. They later emigrated to Argentina, leaving Poirot behind as a "very unhappy old man". Poirot and Hastings reunite during the novels The Big Four, Peril at End House, Lord Edgware Dies, The ABC Murders, and Dumb Witness, when Hastings arrives in England for business, with Poirot noting in ABC Murders that he enjoys having Hastings over because he feels that he always has his most interesting cases with Hastings.

The two collaborate for the final time in Curtain when the seemingly-crippled Poirot asks Hastings to assist him in his final case. When the killer they are tracking nearly manipulates Hastings into committing murder, Poirot describes this in his final farewell letter to Hastings as the catalyst that prompted him to eliminate the man himself, as Poirot knew that his friend was not a murderer and refused to let a man capable of manipulating Hastings in such a manner go on.

=== Mrs Ariadne Oliver ===
The detective novelist Ariadne Oliver is Agatha Christie's self-insert caricature. Like Christie, she is not overly fond of the detective whom she is most famous for creating—in Ariadne's case, the Finnish sleuth Sven Hjerson. Ariadne hates alcohol and public appearances, and has a great fondness for apples until she is put off them by the events of Hallowe'en Party. No information about her husband is given. She has a habit of constantly changing her hairstyle, and much is made of her clothes and hats in every appearance. Her maid, Maria, prevents public adoration from becoming a burden on her employer, but does nothing to prevent Ariadne from becoming a burden on others.

She has authored at least 56 novels and greatly dislikes people modifying her characters. She is the only one in Poirot's universe to have noted that "It's not natural for five or six people to be on the spot when B is murdered and all have a motive for killing B."

The character first appeared in a minor role in two of the twelve Parker Pyne short stories Christie wrote and published in 1932-33. She first met Poirot in the 1936 novel Cards on the Table, and has bothered him ever since. Mrs. Oliver also has a supporting role in the 1961 non-Poirot novel The Pale Horse.

=== Miss Felicity Lemon ===
Poirot's secretary, Miss Felicity Lemon, has few human weaknesses. The only mistakes she makes within the series are a typing error during the events of Hickory Dickory Dock and the mis-mailing of an electricity bill, although she was worried about strange events surrounding her sister who worked at a student hostel at the time. Poirot described her as being "Unbelievably ugly and incredibly efficient. Anything that she mentioned as worth consideration usually was worth consideration." She is an expert on nearly everything and plans to create the perfect filing system.

Miss Lemon first appeared as Poirot's secretary in the 1935 short story "How Does Your Garden Grow?" A "Miss Lemon" is also very fleetingly seen as Parker Pyne's secretary in two 1932 short stories by Christie; there is friendly debate amongst Christie fans as to whether this earlier "Miss Lemon" is meant to be the same character or not.

In The Agatha Christie Hour (which dramatized some of Christie's lesser-known stories, avoiding both Poirot and Miss Marple) Miss Lemon was seen in two episodes as the secretary of Parker Pyne, and was portrayed by Angela Easterling. In Agatha Christie's Poirot, Felicity Lemon was portrayed by Pauline Moran (where she was shown to be efficient, prim and modest, but not remotely "unbelievably ugly".) On a number of occasions she joins Poirot in his inquiries or seeks out answers alone at his request.

=== Chief Inspector James Harold Japp ===
Japp is a Scotland Yard Inspector and appears in several stories trying to solve cases that Poirot is working on. Japp is outgoing, loud, and sometimes inconsiderate by nature, and his relationship with the refined Belgian is one of the stranger aspects of Poirot's world. He first met Poirot in Belgium in 1904, during the Abercrombie Forgery. Later that year they joined forces again to hunt down a criminal known as Baron Altara. They also meet in England where Poirot often helps Japp and lets him take credit in return for special favours. These favours usually entail Poirot being supplied with other interesting cases.

Japp appears in seven of the 19 Poirot novels published between 1920 and 1940 (mostly in a minor capacity in his earliest appearances), and 15 short stories originally published between 1923 to 1947. He is also referenced (without making an appearance) in a handful of other Christie novels, the last reference being in 1948. Adaptations of Christie's work, particularly the TV series Agatha Christie's Poirot (in which Japp was portrayed by Philip Jackson) tend to rewrite her stories to give Japp more prominence, or even insert Japp into stories in which he did not originally appear. In the original Christie novels and stories, Japp is a recurring character but not a consistent presence in Poirot's career and a character who is not seen at all over the final 28 years of the series.

In the film Thirteen at Dinner (1985), adapted from Lord Edgware Dies, the role of Japp was taken by the actor David Suchet, who would later star as Poirot in the ITV adaptations.

=== Colonel Johnnie Race ===
Race is a highly intelligent ex-Army colonel who had a stint as a leader of the counter-intelligence division of the British spy agency MI5. He is immensely rich, having inherited the fortune of Sir Laurence Eardsley. The Colonel stars as a detective in four of Christie's books; he is introduced in The Man in the Brown Suit, published in 1924. He features as Hercule Poirot's good friend in Cards on the Table (1936) and Death on the Nile (1937). He appears for the last time in Sparkling Cyanide (1945), and as with his first appearance, Poirot is not a character in the novel.

In the 1978 film of Death on the Nile Colonel Race is played by David Niven. In the same book's 2004 TV adaptation for the television series Agatha Christie's Poirot, he is played by James Fox. As Fox was unavailable for the 2006 adaptation of Cards on the Table the character was replaced by the similar character "Colonel Hughes", played by Robert Pugh. ITV's adaptation of The Clocks makes the character of Colin Lamb, strongly implied in the book to be the son of Superintendent Battle, into the offspring of Colonel Race. He is also mentioned in the adaptation of Third Girl. In the BBC Radio 4 adaptations of Death on the Nile (1997) and Cards on the Table (2002), Race is played by Donald Sinden.

== Major novels ==
The Poirot books take readers through the whole of his life in England, from the first book (The Mysterious Affair at Styles), where he is a refugee staying at Styles, to the last Poirot book (Curtain), where he visits Styles before his death. In between, Poirot solves cases outside England as well, including his most famous case, Murder on the Orient Express (1934).

Hercule Poirot became famous in 1926 with the publication of The Murder of Roger Ackroyd, whose surprising solution proved controversial. The novel is still among the most famous of all detective novels: Edmund Wilson alludes to it in the title of his well-known attack on detective fiction, "Who Cares Who Killed Roger Ackroyd?" Other critically acclaimed Poirot novels include Murder on the Orient Express (1934); The ABC Murders (1935); Cards on the Table (1936); and Death on the Nile (1937), a tale of multiple murders upon a Nile steamer. Death on the Nile was judged by the famed detective novelist John Dickson Carr to be among the ten greatest mystery novels of all time. The 1942 novel Five Little Pigs (a.k.a. Murder in Retrospect), in which Poirot investigates a murder committed sixteen years before by analysing various accounts of the tragedy, has been called "the best Christie of all" by the critic and mystery novelist Robert Barnard.

In 2014 the Poirot canon was added to by Sophie Hannah, the first author to be commissioned by the Christie estate to write an original story. The novel was called The Monogram Murders, and was set in the late 1920s, placing it chronologically between The Mystery of the Blue Train and Peril at End House. A second Hannah-penned Poirot came out in 2016, called Closed Casket, and a third, The Mystery of Three Quarters, in 2018. She has also written The Killings at Kingfisher Hall (2020), Hercule Poirot's Silent Night (2023), and The Last Death of the Year (2025).

== Portrayals ==
=== Stage ===
The first actor to portray Poirot was Charles Laughton. He appeared on the West End in 1928 in the play Alibi which had been adapted by Michael Morton from the novel The Murder of Roger Ackroyd. In 1932, the play was performed as The Fatal Alibi on Broadway. Another Poirot play, Black Coffee, opened in London at the Embassy Theatre on 8 December 1930 and starred Francis L. Sullivan as Poirot.

Black Coffee was revived by The Agatha Christie Theatre Company for an extensive UK tour in 2014. Poirot was initially portrayed by Robert Powell, with Jason Durr later taking over the role partway through the run.

American playwright Ken Ludwig adapted Murder on the Orient Express into a play, which premiered at the McCarter Theatre in Princeton, New Jersey on 14 March 2017. It starred the actor Allan Corduner in the role of Poirot. A 2022 UK production starred Henry Goodman. A new touring production will star Michael Maloney as Poirot.

Other notable actors who have portrayed Poirot on stage include Ronnie Barker, Leonard Rossiter, Ronald Magill, Patrick Cargill and Alfred Marks.

=== Film ===
==== Austin Trevor ====
Austin Trevor debuted the role of Poirot on screen in the 1931 British film Alibi. The film was based on the stage play. Trevor reprised the role of Poirot twice, in Black Coffee and Lord Edgware Dies. Trevor said once that he was probably cast as Poirot simply because he could do a French accent. Notably, Trevor's Poirot did not have a moustache. Leslie S. Hiscott directed the first two films, and Henry Edwards took over for the third.

==== Tony Randall ====
Tony Randall portrayed Poirot in The Alphabet Murders, a 1965 film also known as The ABC Murders. This was more a satire of Poirot than a straightforward adaptation and was greatly changed from the original. Much of the story, set in modern times, was played for comedy, with Poirot investigating the murders while evading the attempts by Hastings (Robert Morley) and the police to get him out of England and back to Belgium.

==== Albert Finney ====
Albert Finney played Poirot in the 1974 film Murder on the Orient Express. For his performance he was nominated for an Academy Award for Best Actor and BAFTA Award for Best Actor in a Leading Role, though he did not win either.

==== Peter Ustinov ====
Peter Ustinov as Poirot during filming of the 1988 film Appointment with Death. Ustinov played Poirot in six films between 1978 and 1988.

Peter Ustinov played Poirot six times, starting with Death on the Nile (1978). He reprised the role in Evil Under the Sun (1982) and Appointment with Death (1988).

Christie's daughter Rosalind Hicks observed Ustinov during a rehearsal and said, "That's not Poirot! He isn't at all like that!" Ustinov overheard and remarked "He is now!"

He appeared again as Poirot in three television films: Thirteen at Dinner (1985), Dead Man's Folly (1986), and Murder in Three Acts (1986). Earlier adaptations were set during the time in which the novels were written, but these television films were set in the contemporary era. The first of these was based on Lord Edgware Dies and was made by Warner Bros. It also starred Faye Dunaway, with David Suchet as Inspector Japp, just before Suchet began to play Poirot. David Suchet considers his performance as Japp to be "possibly the worst performance of [his] career".

==== Kenneth Branagh ====
Kenneth Branagh played Poirot in film adaptations of Murder on the Orient Express in 2017, Death on the Nile in 2022, and A Haunting in Venice, based on the novel Hallowe'en Party, in 2023. Branagh directed all three and co-produced them alongside Ridley Scott. They were all written by Michael Green.

==== Other ====
- Anatoly Ravikovich, Zagadka Endkhauza (End House Mystery) (1989; based on "Peril at End House")
- Pál Mácsai, A titokzatos stylesi eset (The Mysterious Affair at Styles) (2023)

=== Television ===
==== David Suchet ====
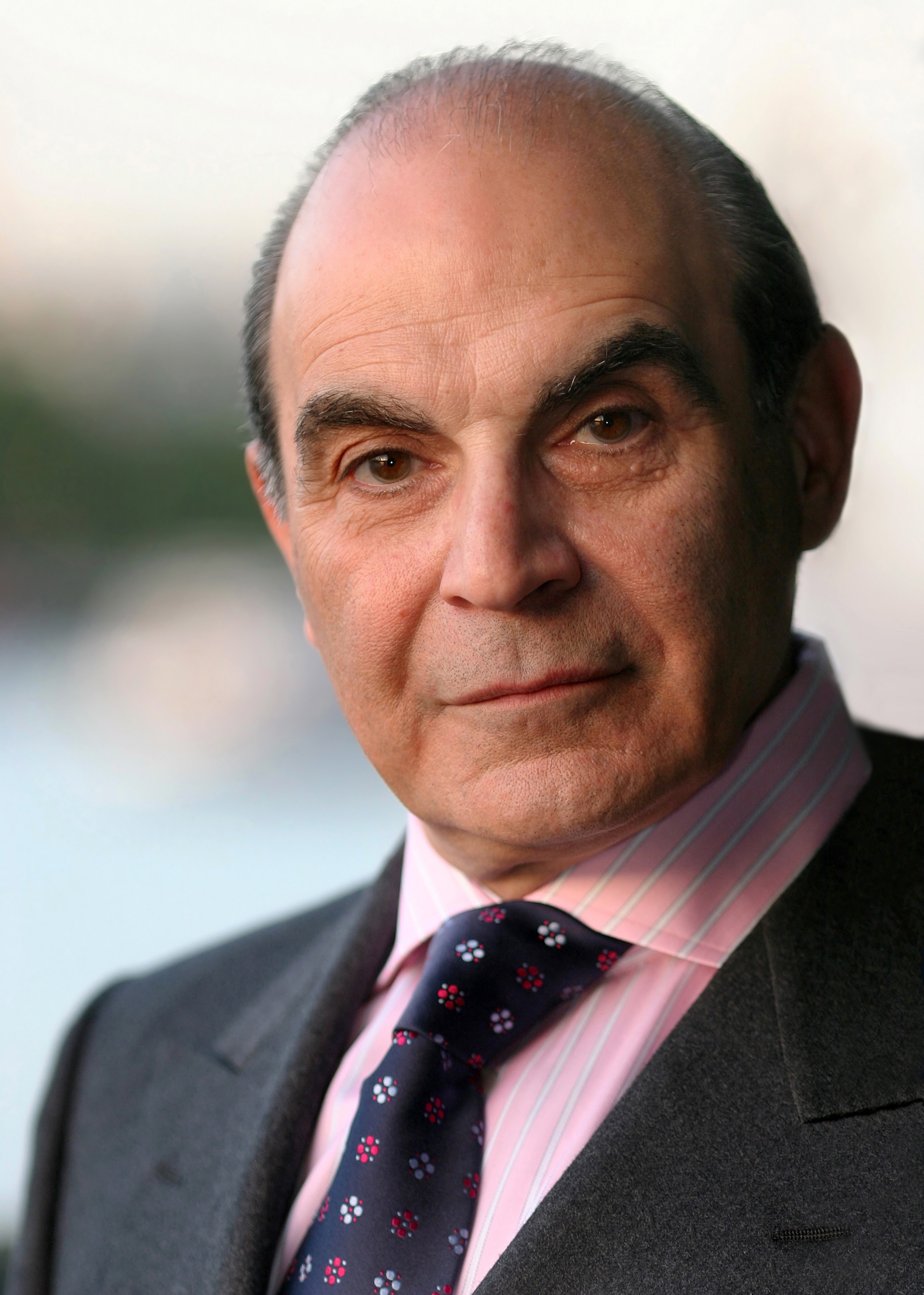
David Suchet portrayed Poirot from 1989 to 2013 in the ITV series Agatha Christie's Poirot from 1989 until June 2013.

David Suchet played Poirot for 25 years on ITV. The series adapted every single novel and short story Christie had written about Poirot. His final appearance in the show was in an adaptation of Curtain, aired on 13 November 2013.

Entertainment Weekly picked Suchet as "Best Poirot" in the "Hercule Poirot & Miss Marple" timeline.

==== Other ====
- Heini Göbel, (1955; an adaptation of Murder on the Orient Express for the West German television series Die Galerie der großen Detektive)
- José Ferrer, Hercule Poirot (1961; unaired TV pilot, MGM; adaptation of "The Disappearance of Mr. Davenheim")
- Martin Gabel, General Electric Theater (4/1/1962; adaptation of "The Disappearance of Mr. Davenheim")
- Horst Bollmann, Black Coffee 1973
- Ian Holm, Murder by the Book, 1986
- Arnolds Liniņš, Slepkavība Stailzā (The Mysterious Affair at Styles), 1990
- Hugh Laurie, Spice World, 1997
- Alfred Molina, Murder on the Orient Express, 2001
- Konstantin Raikin, Neudacha Puaro (Poirot's Failure) (2002; based on "The Murder of Roger Ackroyd")
- Anthony O'Donnell, Agatha Christie: A Life in Pictures, 2004
- Shirō Itō (Takashi Akafuji), Meitantei Akafuji Takashi (The Detective Takashi Akafuji), 2005
- Mansai Nomura (Takeru Suguro), Orient Kyūkō Satsujin Jiken (Murder on the Orient Express), 2015; Kuroido Goroshi (The Murder of Kuroido), 2018 (based on "The Murder of Roger Ackroyd"); Shi to no Yakusoku, 2021 (based on Appointment with Death)
- John Malkovich was Poirot in the 2018 BBC adaptation of The ABC Murders.
- Edward Bluemel will star in Hercule, a new Poirot series to be produced by the BBC in 2027.

=== Anime ===
In 2004 the Japanese public broadcaster NHK produced a 39-episode anime series titled Agatha Christie's Great Detectives Poirot and Marple, as well as a manga series under the same title released in 2005. The series, adapting several of the best-known Poirot and Marple stories, ran from 4 July 2004 through 15 May 2005, and in repeated reruns on NHK and other networks in Japan. Poirot was voiced by Kōtarō Satomi and Miss Marple was voiced by Kaoru Yachigusa.

=== Audio ===
==== BBC Radio ====
An adaptation of Murder in the Mews was broadcast on the BBC Light Programme in March 1955 starring Richard Bebb as Poirot; this programme was thought lost, but was discovered in the BBC Archives in 2015.

From 1985 to 2007 BBC Radio 4 produced a series of twenty-seven adaptations of Poirot novels and short stories, adapted by Michael Bakewell and directed by Enyd Williams. Twenty-five starred John Moffatt as Poirot; Maurice Denham and Peter Sallis played Poirot on BBC Radio 4 in the first two adaptations, The Mystery of the Blue Train and Hercule Poirot's Christmas.

==== Audible ====
In 2017 Audible released an original audio adaptation of Murder on the Orient Express starring Tom Conti as Poirot. The cast included Jane Asher as Mrs. Hubbard, Jay Benedict as Monsieur Bouc, Ruta Gedmintas as Countess Andrenyi, Sophie Okonedo as Mary Debenham, Eddie Marsan as Ratchett, Walles Hamonde as Hector MacQueen, Paterson Joseph as Colonel Arbuthnot, Rula Lenska as Princess Dragomiroff and Art Malik as the Narrator. According to the publisher's summary on Audible.com, "sound effects [were] recorded on the Orient Express itself."

Audible released a dramatisation of The Mysterious Affair at Styles in November 2024. The ensemble cast was led by Peter Dinklage as Poirot. Dinklage returned for The ABC Murders in 2025.

==== Others ====
In 1939 Orson Welles and the Mercury Players dramatised Roger Ackroyd on CBS's Campbell Playhouse. Welles voiced both Poirot and Dr. Sheppard.

On 6 October 1942 the Mutual radio series Murder Clinic broadcast "The Tragedy at Marsden Manor" starring Maurice Tarplin as Poirot. At least two other Poirot stories were adapted for the series, but it is unknown who voiced him.

A 1945 radio series of at least 13 original half-hour episodes (none of which apparently adapt any Christie stories) transferred Poirot from London to New York and starred character actor Harold Huber, perhaps better known for his appearances as a police officer in various Charlie Chan films. On 22 February 1945, "speaking from London, Agatha Christie introduced the initial broadcast of the Poirot series via shortwave".

In 2021 L.A. Theatre Works produced an adaptation of The Murder on the Links, dramatised by Kate McAll. Alfred Molina starred as Poirot, with Simon Helberg as Hastings.

In 2025, Radio Mirchi produced a Bengali adaptation of The ABC Murders, starring Anirban Chakrabarti as Poirot. He has subsequently reprised the role in further audio dramas.

=== Video games ===
In the video games Agatha Christie - Hercule Poirot: The First Cases and Agatha Christie - Hercule Poirot: The London Case, Poirot is voiced by Will de Renzy-Martin.

=== Parodies and references ===
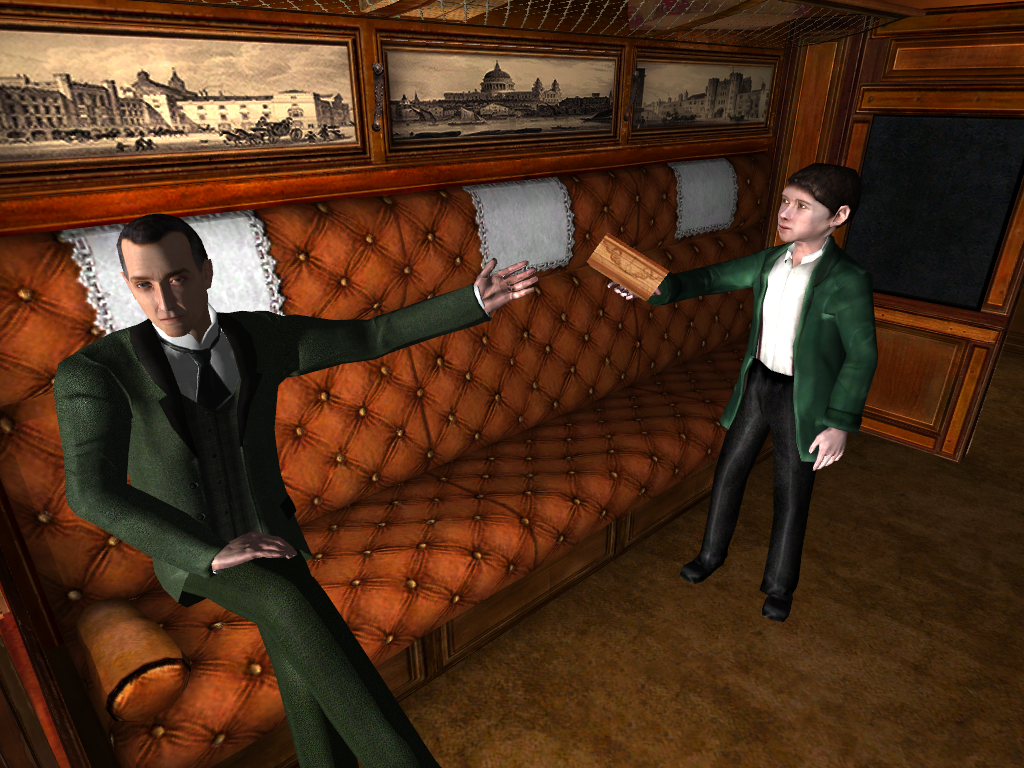
Holmes and Poirot in Sherlock Holmes: The Awakened (2007)

Parodies of Hercule Poirot have appeared in a number of movies, including Revenge of the Pink Panther, in which Poirot makes a cameo appearance in a mental asylum, portrayed by Andrew Sachs and claiming to be "the greatest detective in all of France, the greatest in all the world"; Neil Simon's Murder by Death, where "Milo Perrier" is played by the American actor James Coco; the 1977 film The Strange Case of the End of Civilization as We Know It (1977); the film Spice World, in which Hugh Laurie plays Poirot; and in Sherlock Holmes: The Awakened, Poirot appears as a young boy on the train transporting Holmes and Watson. Holmes helps the boy in opening a puzzle-box, with Watson giving the boy advice about using his "little grey cells".

In the book series Geronimo Stilton the character Hercule Poirat is inspired by Hercule Poirot.

The Belgian brewery Brasserie Ellezelloise makes a stout called Hercule with a moustachioed caricature of Hercule Poirot on the label.

In season 2, episode 4 of TVFPlay's Indian web series Permanent Roommates, one of the characters refers to Hercule Poirot as her inspiration while she attempts to solve the mystery of the cheating spouse. Throughout the episode, she is mocked as Hercule Poirot and Agatha Christie by the suspects. TVFPlay also telecasted a spoof of Indian TV suspense drama CID as "Qissa Missing Dimaag Ka: C.I.D Qtiyapa". In the first episode, when Ujjwal is shown to browse for the best detectives of the world, Suchet appears as Poirot in his search.

== See also ==
- List of actors who have played Hercule Poirot
- Poirot Investigates

== Bibliography ==
=== Works ===
- Christie, Agatha (2019) [1920]. The Mysterious Affair at Styles. Penguin. ISBN 978-0-525-56510-9.
- Christie, Agatha (1947). "Prologue". The Labours of Hercules. Collins.
- Christie, Agatha (1947a). "The Apples of the Hesperides". The Labours of Hercules. Collins.
- Christie, Agatha (1947b). "The Stymphalean Birds". The Labours of Hercules. Collins.
- Christie, Agatha (1947c) [February 1940]. "The Erymanthian Boar". The Labours of Hercules. Collins.
- Christie, Agatha (1948). Taken at the Flood.
- Christie, Agatha (1952). Mrs. McGinty's Dead.
- Christie, Agatha (1961). The Pale Horse. Collins.
- Christie, Agatha (1975). Curtain: Poirot's Last Case. HarperCollins. ISBN 978-0-00-712112-0.
- Christie, Agatha (1980). Evil Under the Sun: Death Comes as the End; The Sittaford Mystery. Lansdowne Press. ISBN 978-0-7018-1458-8.
- Christie, Agatha (1991). The A.B.C. murders: [a Hercule Poirot mystery]. Berkley Publishing Group. ISBN 978-0-425-13024-7.
- Christie, Agatha (28 September 2004a) [1963]. The Clocks. HarperCollins. ISBN 978-0-06-174050-3.
- Christie, Agatha (6 January 2004b). The Big Four. HarperCollins. ISBN 978-0-06-173909-5.
- Christie, Agatha (25 January 2005). After the Funeral: Hercule Poirot Investigates. HarperCollins. ISBN 978-0-06-173991-0.
- Christie, Agatha (3 October 2006a) [1947]. The Labours of Hercules: Hercule Poirot Investigates. HarperCollins. ISBN 978-0-06-174638-3.
- Christie, Agatha (3 October 2006b). Three Act Tragedy. HarperCollins. ISBN 978-0-06-175403-6.
- Christie, Agatha (17 March 2009) [1926]. The Murder of Roger Ackroyd. HarperCollins. ISBN 978-0-06-176340-3.
- Christie, Agatha (17 March 2009b) [1932]. Peril at End House. HarperCollins. ISBN 978-0-06-174927-8.
- Christie, Agatha (10 February 2010a). Death in the Clouds. HarperCollins. ISBN 978-0-06-174311-5.
- Christie, Agatha (1 February 2011a). Five Little Pigs: A Hercule Poirot Mystery. HarperCollins. ISBN 978-0-06-207357-0.
- Christie, Agatha (29 March 2011). Murder on the Orient Express: A Hercule Poirot Mystery. HarperCollins. ISBN 978-0-06-207350-1.
- Christie, Agatha (1 September 2011b). The Dream: A Hercule Poirot Short Story. HarperCollins Publishers. ISBN 978-0-00-745198-2.
- Christie, Agatha (14 June 2011c) [1966]. Third Girl: A Hercule Poirot Mystery. HarperCollins. ISBN 978-0-06-207376-1.
- Christie, Agatha (12 April 2012). The Kidnapped Prime Minister: A Hercule Poirot Short Story (ebook ed.). HarperCollins Publishers. ISBN 978-0-00-748658-8.
- Christie, Agatha (2013) [1999]. Hercule Poirot: The Complete Short Stories: A Hercule Poirot Collection with Foreword by Charles Todd. HarperCollins. ISBN 978-0-06-225165-7.
- Christie, Agatha (9 July 2013a). The Lost Mine: A Hercule Poirot Story. HarperCollins. ISBN 978-0-06-229818-8.
- Christie, Agatha (23 July 2013b). Double Sin: A Hercule Poirot Story. HarperCollins. ISBN 978-0-06-229845-4.
- Barnard, Robert (1980). A Talent to Deceive. London: Fontana/Collins.
- Goddard, John (2018), Agatha Christie's Golden Age: An Analysis of Poirot's Golden Age Puzzles, Stylish Eye Press, ISBN 978-1-999-61200-9
- Hart, Anne (2004). Agatha Christie's Poirot: The Life and Times of Hercule Poirot. London: Harper and Collins.
- Kretzschmar, Judith; Stoppe, Sebastian; Vollberg, Susanne, eds. (2016). Hercule Poirot trifft Miss Marple. Agatha Christie intermedial [Hercule Poirot meets Miss Marple] (in German). Darmstadt: Büchner. ISBN 978-3-941310-48-3.
- Osborne, Charles (1982). The Life and Crimes of Agatha Christie. London: Collins.
- Vermandere, Martine (2016). "Case closed? De speurtocht naar de inspiratie voor Agatha Christie's Hercule Poirot" [Case closed? The search for the inspiration for Agatha Christie's Hercule Poirot]. Brood & Rozen (in Dutch). 21 (1). doi:10.21825/br.v21i1.9945. hdl:1854/LU-8041744.
