= Hercule Poirot (American radio series) =

American radio mystery series (1945–1947)

Hercule Poirot (UK: /ˈɛərkjuːl ˈpwɑːroʊ/, US: /hɜːrˈkjuːl pwɑːˈroʊ/) is an American radio mystery drama that began on February 22, 1945, on Mutual and ended on November 21, 1947, on CBS. Harold Huber portrayed Hercule Poirot, the fictional Belgian detective who was featured in Agatha Christie's novels. Christie chose Huber for the role after she saw him in the film Charlie Chan at Monte Carlo (1937). In the series, Poirot was based in New York, rather than the London setting found in the books. Many of the episodes had Poirot "involved in substantive international capers".

== Mutual series ==
The series on Mutual was also known as The Adventures of M. Hercule Poirot and Agatha Christie's Poirot, It consisted of 30-minute episodes, each of which contained a complete story. Episodes were broadcast on Thursdays at 8:30 p.m. Eastern Time from February 22, 1945, through September 6, 1945. Two additional broadcasts on Mutual occurred on Sundays (October 7 and October 14, 1945) at 9 p.m., ending Poirot's run on that network. (Another source says that the series ran until February 17, 1946, "before legal disputes over scripting halted it.") Some episodes (including "The Case of the Roving Corpse" and "The Trail Led to Death") were original, and others were adapted from Christie's stories (including "Rendezvous with Death", an adaptation of Death on the Nile).

=== Lawsuit ===
In January 1946 writer Martin Stern won a suit in the state of New York's Supreme Court for breach of contract against Huber and Eastman, with whom Stern had agreed to provide scripts for the Poirot program. Stern charged that he received no payment after Huber sold the scripts to Mutual independently. Two radio writers and editors testified on Stern's behalf that they had revised his scripts for Huber, and three radio executives were witnesses for Huber. After five days of testimony and decision, Judge Henry Clay Greenberg ruled in Stern's favor, awarding him $14,000 and costs.

=== Critical response ===
A review in the trade publication Variety said that the March 22, 1945, episode ("The Case of the Roaming Corpse") kept a listener's interest with the quality of its script and music. Overall, however, the review said that the series had "been running hot and cold, one week a good show, next a bad one."

== CBS series ==
The CBS series (known as Mystery of the Week) consisted of 15-minute episodes that ran on weekday evenings, with each story in five parts, ending on Friday, It began at 7 p.m. E. T. on April 1, 1946, and ended on November 21, 1947. Procter & Gamble was the sponsor, promoting Ivory soap and Dreft dishwashing detergent. Nelson Case, Ron Rawson, and Richard Stark were the announcers. Carl Eastman was the director; Alfred Bester and Louis Vittes were the writers. It was replaced by Beulah.

=== Critical response ===
A Variety review called the August 19, 1946, episode "a tight and fast-paced story within which the detective's smart deductions operate skillfully." The review complimented Huber's portrayal of Poirot and described the supporting cast as "thoroughly competent".
