= Closed Casket (novel) =

2016 Poirot novel by Sophie Hannah

- Author: Sophie Hannah
- Language: English
- Series: Hercule Poirot
- Genre: Detective, mystery
- Published: 6 September 2016 HarperCollins
- Publication place: United Kingdom
- Media type: Print (hardback and paperback)
- Pages: 384 pp (first edition, hardcover)
- ISBN: 0-00-813409-X
- Preceded by: The Monogram Murders
- Followed by: The Mystery of Three Quarters

Closed Casket is a mystery novel by British writer Sophie Hannah, featuring Agatha Christie's Hercule Poirot. Hannah is the first author to have been authorised by the Christie estate to write new stories for her characters. Hannah's work closely resembles the Golden Age of Detective Fiction in its structure and tropes. Closed Casket even includes a plan of the house in which the murder takes place; such plans were sometimes used in Golden Age novels to aid the reader in their solving of the mystery puzzle.

== Plot summary ==
Lady Athelinda Playford, the author of a popular series of children's mystery novels, summons her children, lawyers, Hercule Poirot, and Scotland Yard detective Edward Catchpool to her home, Lillieoak, in Clonakilty, Ireland. At dinner, she announces a shocking change to her will. She has disinherited her son Harry and daughter Claudia in favor of her charismatic secretary, Joseph Scotcher, who is terminally ill and has only weeks to live. She intends to take Joseph to her own doctor and make all efforts necessary to save his life. Harry's wife Dorro lashes out, while Claudia and her fiance, Dr. Randall Kimpton, are disdainful. Joseph is alarmed by the change to the will but spontaneously proposes marriage to his nurse, Sophie Bourlet.

That night, everyone hears Sophie screaming and rushes to the scene. Joseph Scotcher has been violently killed. Sophie claims that she has just witnessed Claudia clubbing him in the head as he begged for his life. However, the time does not make sense; Claudia has arrived at the room with the others and has also changed clothes, something she should not have had time for.

The inquest into Scotcher’s death reveals that he was already dead of strychnine poisoning before being clubbed in the head. Additionally, he was not terminally ill and was actually in perfect health. Poirot and Catchpool begin investigating the alibis of the dysfunctional family, uncovering various lies. Poirot believes Sophie’s account, although it is seemingly impossible to reconcile with the timeline.

Kimpton and Claudia reveal that they already knew Scotcher was faking his illness. Kimpton was friends with Scotcher in college but grew suspicious when Scotcher began claiming to be dying. Iris, the girl Kimpton was seeing, left him for Scotcher and later died under suspicious circumstances. Lady Playford had also discovered that Scotcher was a habitual liar. Her will was meant to interrupt Scotcher’s lies so that he could be rehabilitated. She invited Poirot and Catchpool to guard against Scotcher turning violent.

Poirot returns from an investigative trip to Oxford and gathers everyone for his announcement. He reveals that Sophie’s testimony was flawed; she went into shock upon seeing Claudia clubbing Joseph, so more time passed than previously realized, meaning that Claudia had time to leave and change out of her bloodstained clothes.

The killer was Kimpton, who was obsessed with proving that Scotcher was lying. He also suspected that Scotcher murdered Iris to keep her from revealing the truth. He used his relationship with Claudia for access to Scotcher. At the dinner where Lady Playford announced the change to her will, Kimpton recognized that there would now be multiple potential suspects, and slipped strychnine into Scotcher’s drink. Scotcher died a few hours later. Furious at Kimpton’s manipulation, Claudia sabotaged his coverup by moving Scotcher’s body and bludgeoning him. When Sophie thought she was hearing Joseph beg for his life, she was actually hearing Kimpton begging Claudia to stop. With the truth revealed, Kimpton commits suicide by drinking strychnine.

== Characters ==
=== Upstairs (family and guests) ===
- Hercule Poirot, retired Belgian policeman turned private investigator, invited to the Playford mansion by Lady Athelinda to prevent a murder
- Edward Catchpool, inspector with Scotland Yard, also invited by Lady Athelinda
- Lady Athelinda Playford, a sprightly and mischievous woman, author of an Enid Blyton-esque series of children's mysteries about a young sleuth, Shrimp Seddon, and her friends
- Viscount Harry Playford, Lady Athelinda's son, a thoroughly self-absorbed, insensitive man, preoccupied with his hobby, taxidermy
- Dorro Playford, Harry's wife, a haughty and self-righteous woman, obsessed with Harry's inheritance from both his mother and his late father
- Claudia Playford, Lady Athelinda's daughter, a callous and caustic young woman, disrespectful of others and frequently cruel, stemming from childhood resentments
- Randall Kimpton, Claudia's fiancé, a doctor and Oxford graduate, originally a Shakespearean scholar, extremely arrogant, and devoted to Claudia, as she is to him
- Joseph Scotcher, Lady Athelinda's secretary, an extremely kind and flattering man, who easily wins people's trust and affection; he is dying of Bright's disease of the kidneys
- Sophie Bourlet, Joseph's nurse, in love with him, as he loves her
- Michael Gathercole, Lady Athelinda's lawyer and literary executor, who read and fell in love with the Shrimp Seddon books while growing up in an orphanage
- Orville Rolfe, Lady Athelinda's lawyer and Gathercole's joint partner in their firm, an extremely fat and gluttonous man

=== Downstairs (staff) ===
- Hatton, the butler, an elderly and recalcitrant man, always, it seems, afraid of letting slip some secret
- Brigid, the cook, a brusque and put-upon woman, always complaining about her fellow staff and the guests
- Phyllis, the maid, a naive and silly young woman, persecuted by Brigid and enamoured with Joseph

=== Others ===
- Inspector Conree, a pompous and bombastic high-ranking Dublin detective
- Sergeant O'Dwyer, Conree's assistant, lacking confidence due to his boss' frequent tongue-lashings

== Reviews ==
Good Housekeeping wrote about the novel: "Closed Casket is deviously plotted, deeply satisfying and does the grande dame of crime proud."

Sunday Times wrote: "Sparkling second outing for Hannah's re-imagined Poirot. The setting (posh Irish country house), the characters (country lawyers, creepy male secretary, stroppy flapper, etc) and the period vocabulary are all spot on, but it's the utter fiendish unpredictability of the plot that makes Sophie the new Agatha."

== Continuity with Christie's original stories ==
Returning in this novel is Hannah's own creation, Scotland Yard inspector Edward Catchpool, who serves a similar function to Poirot's original sidekick, Arthur Hastings. The story of Closed Casket takes place mere months after The Monogram Murders, in which Catchpool made his debut. This suggests that, like that novel, this one is sandwiched chronologically between The Mystery of the Blue Train (published 1928) and Peril at End House (1932), the latter of which featured Hastings, who before then had not appeared since the novel immediately preceding Blue Train, The Big Four (1927).

Closed Casket features elements popular among Christie and her contemporaries during the golden age of detective fiction, including a blueprint sketch of the house where the murder takes place, an armchair detective's guide featured in Christie and Poirot's debut, The Mysterious Affair at Styles.

=== Historicity ===
The novel takes place in the Irish Free State, an independent state founded in 1922 and lasting until 1937. References to the Free State and Irish nationalism are made in the story, such as the destruction by rebels of homes belonging to descendants of the landed gentry.

== Commissioning by Agatha Christie estate ==
This is the second novel by Hannah to feature Christie's popular hero, Hercule Poirot, a retired Belgian policeman turned private investigator. Its predecessor is 2014's The Monogram Murders, which was the first novel using one of Christie's original characters to be authorised by her estate in the thirty-eight years since her death (excluding novelisations of Christie's plays by Charles Osborne).

The last Poirot novel Christie wrote, Elephants Can Remember, was published in 1972, while the swansong she wrote for the character during the 1940s, Curtain, was published in 1976.

== Miscellaneous ==
An article in The New Yorker suggested that the novel was inspired by Sophie Hannah's suspicions about her editor Dan Mallory. Like Mallory, the charismatic Scotcher fakes a terminal illness and pretends to be his own brother to back up his claims.
