= Rowena Cook Baggerly =

American actress (1917/18–2004)

Rowena Cook Baggerly (1917 or 1918 – March 2, 2004) was an American actress.

== Early years ==
Baggerly was born Rowena Cook in Staten Island, New York. She lived in Pasadena for much of her childhood and grew up wanting to be a ballerina. Her education in Pasadena was complemented by private schools and two years studying abroad. She was involved in school plays, which turned her interest toward acting as a career.

== Career ==
In 1939, Cook was the female winner (along with John Archer) in the first round of competition on the radio program Gateway to Hollywood, "a series of on-air screen tests". Her rewards for winning included the screen name Alice Eden, membership in the Screen Actors Guild, and a six-month film contract.

Billed as Alice Eden, Cook portrayed a town drunk's daughter in the film Career (1939). Her post-contest experience led her to change her approach to her career. Although she had studied dramatics for years, she found that in Hollywood she was considered "more as just a contest winner than as a schooled performer." When her contract ended, she resumed use of her birth name and sought work as a freelance actress. Those efforts led to a role in Kit Carson (1940), with producer Edward Small enhancing her part after seeing her screen test.

== Public service ==
During World War II, Cook obtained release from her film contract to go to New York, where by day she helped train female Navy recruits, while at night she continued acting, including performing in a stage production of John Loves Mary. When her husband Vaughn Baggerly was stationed in Tokyo during the Korean War, she was a volunteer worker with a rehabilitation program operated in that city by the Red Cross.

== Personal life ==
While she was in Hollywood, Cook's marriage to an actor lasted less than a year. In 1948 she married Vaughn Baggerly, who directed the play in which she appeared. He later became a career Army officer, and they remained wed until his death in 1990. Although both of them left the theater as a profession, they worked with local theatrical groups in places where they lived.

== Death ==
On March 2, 2004, Baggerly died in Governors Park nursing home in Barrington, Illinois, at age 86.
