= Peril at End House =

1932 mystery novel by Agatha Christie

- Dust-jacket illustration of the US (true first) edition. See Publication history (below) for UK first edition jacket image.
- Author: Agatha Christie
- Cover artist: Not known
- Language: English
- Series: Hercule Poirot
- Genre: Crime novel
- Publisher: Dodd, Mead and Company
- Publication date: February 1932
- Publication place: United Kingdom; United States
- Media type: Print (hardback & paperback)
- Pages: 270 (first edition, hardcover)
- Preceded by: The Mystery of the Blue Train (novel); Black Coffee (play)
- Followed by: Lord Edgware Dies

Peril at End House is a mystery novel by British writer Agatha Christie, first published in the US by the Dodd, Mead and Company in February 1932 and in the UK by the Collins Crime Club in March of the same year. The US edition retailed at $2.00 and the UK edition at seven shillings and sixpence (7/6).

The book features Christie's private detective Hercule Poirot, as well as Arthur Hastings and Chief Inspector Japp, and is the sixth novel featuring Poirot. Poirot and Hastings holiday in Cornwall, meeting young Magdala "Nick" Buckley and her friends. He is persuaded that someone is out to kill her. They meet all of her friends at her home called End House. Though he aims to protect Nick, a murder happens that provokes Poirot to mount a serious investigation.

The novel was well received when first published, with the plot remarked as unusually ingenious and diabolically clever by reviewers. Writing in 1990, Robert Barnard found it cunning, but not one of Christie's very best. It has been adapted to stage, radio, film, television, graphic novel, and a computer game, and translated to many other languages as a book.

== Plot summary ==
Poirot and Hastings are staying at a Cornish resort, where they are met by Magdala "Nick" Buckley, who lives in her home of End House. After a bullet is shot past her head, which she assumes initially was a wasp, Poirot suspects she is in danger and expresses his concerns to her. Asked who would want her dead, Nick reveals she has two cousins – Maggie Buckley, who lives elsewhere; and Charles Vyse, a solicitor who helped remortgage her home for funds she desperately needed. Nick's inner circle includes: Ellen, her housekeeper; Mr and Mrs Croft, Australian lodgers living near to End House; George Challenger, who has a soft spot for her; Freddie Rice, her closest friend and an abused wife; and Jim Lazarus, an art dealer who loves Freddie. Poirot finds it unclear who among them wants her dead. Although Nick made a will six months ago, at the suggestion of the Crofts, the only beneficiaries in it, Charles and Freddie, would gain very little from the estate of End House.

Nick is advised by Poirot to have Maggie stay with her for a few weeks. When she arrives, Nick holds a party inviting her inner circle, with the exception of George. During the party, she receives a call while her guest are enjoying themselves. Shortly afterwards, Maggie is found dead, wearing Nick's shawl. George is relieved to find Nick is still alive when he arrives, as everyone assumes Maggie was killed by mistake. A furious Poirot, unable to forgive himself for letting the incident happen on his watch, launches an investigation with Hastings assisting him. To protect Nick, he advises her to tell everyone she is going to the hospital, and that she must not eat anything that comes from an unknown source. The next day, Poirot reads a newspaper article reporting the death of renowned pilot Michael Seton, who had gone missing on a flight, a matter he overheard being discussed at the party by the guests.

Suspecting Nick's telephone call was about Michael, he questions her, and she confesses the pair were secretly engaged. She reveals Michael was the sole heir to a vast fortune, which Nick as his fiancée now stands to inherit. Poirot becomes wary about the Crofts motives in Nick's affairs, and asks Inspector James Japp to inquire about them. Michael's love letters to Nick are found by Poirot and Hastings, but Nick's original will is missing; Charles denies receiving it, while Mr Croft contradicts him by claiming he sent it to the solicitor. Poirot suspects one of the men is lying. Nick later receives a box of chocolates laced with cocaine, allegedly sent by Poirot, of which she only eats one piece that doesn't kill her. The gift was delivered by Freddie, who claims when questioned that her friend asked for them. Poirot suspects Freddie is a cocaine addict.

To discover who is trying to kill Nick, he arranges a ruse with her help, by telling the others she died in the hospital. Charles reveals that Nick's will has turned up and holds a will-reading at End House, in which the Crofts inherit her estate as a reward for helping her father in Australia. Poirot then holds a seance to contact Nick's "ghost", which appears, causing the Crofts to reveal themselves. Japp arrives, revealing the pair are forgers. Poirot suspected they stole Nick's will, then gave Charles a forged one after her reported death, but they were not murderers. Freddie later is frightened when someone shoots at her before killing himself; Poirot finds it to be her husband, who was sick and had been begging her for money. Once everything calms down, Poirot reveals that Maggie's murder was not a mistake; she had been killed by Nick, who had no proper control over her financial situation.

In his denouement, Poirot reveals that Michael's love letters referenced Nick as two people, leading him to conclude Michael was in love with Maggie, not Nick; both cousins had the same first name. Upon learning of Michael's wealth and disappearance, Nick plotted to usurp his fortune by killing Maggie and posing as his fiancée. The attempts on her life were staged by her, while the cocaine in the chocolates came from George – he supplied both Freddie and Nick with the drug, concealed in wristwatches. Nick is arrested, but takes Freddie's wristwatch; Poirot suspects she will overdose on cocaine to avoid being hanged. George is advised by Poirot to surrender himself or leave, hoping this will allow Freddie to recover. Jim later proposes marriage to Freddie, before revealing to Poirot that Nick failed to notice she owned a painting of considerable value, a fact that would have prevented her needing to commit her crimes.

== Characters ==
- Hercule Poirot – The famed Belgian detective, in charge of investigating the case regarding Nick's various escapes from death. He is on holiday in Cornwall.
- Captain Arthur Hastings – Poirot's loyal friend and assistant, who is on holiday with the detective. He is the narrator of the story.
- Inspector Japp – The officer for the case. He has a minor role in the story.
- Magdala "Nick" Buckley – A young and seductive woman. She is the owner of End House.
- Frederica "Freddie" Rice – Nick's close best friend. She is divorced, due to her ex-husband's abuse.
- Jim Lazarus – A dealer of art, and Freddie's sensational admirer. He is a friend of Nick.
- Commander George Challenger – A commander of the Royal Navy. He is also a friend of Nick.
- Charles Vyse – Nick's cousin and trustworthy lawyer.
- Maggie Buckley – Another cousin of Nick. She is the victim of the case.
- Bert Croft – An Australian leaser of the lodge near End House.
- Mildred Croft – Bert's wife.
- Michael Seton – A well-known aviator. He is supposedly Nick's fiancé.
- Ellen – Nick's hesitant housekeeper.
- William Wilson – The gardener of End House, and Ellen's husband.
- Alfred Wilson – Ellen and William's son.
- Mr. Rice – Freddie's abusive ex-husband.

== Literary significance and reception ==
The Times Literary Supplement on 14 April 1932, stated that the "actual solution is quite unusually ingenious, and well up to the standard of Mrs. Christie's best stories. Everything is perfectly fair, and it is possible to guess the solution of the puzzle fairly early in the book, though it is certainly not easy." The review further opined that, "This is certainly one of those detective stories which is pure puzzle, without any ornament or irrelevant interest in character. Poirot and his faithful Captain Hastings are characters whom one is glad to meet again, and they are the most lively in the book, but even they are little more than pawns in this problem. But the plot is arranged with almost mathematical neatness, and that is all that one wants."

Isaac Anderson began his review in The New York Times Book Review on 6 March 1932, by writing "With Agatha Christie as the author and Hercule Poirot as the central figure, one is always assured of an entertaining story with a real mystery to it ... [T]he person who is responsible for the dirty work at End House is diabolically clever, but not quite clever enough to fool the little Belgian detective all the time. A good story with a most surprising finish."

Robert Barnard: "A cunning use of simple tricks used over and over in Christie's career (be careful, for example, about names – diminutives and ambiguous male-female Christian names are always possibilities as readers discover). Some creaking in the machinery, and rather a lot of melodrama and improbabilities, prevent this from being one of the very best of the classic specimens."

Christie scholar John Curran ranked Peril at End House as one of her ten best novels.

== References to other works ==
- Two references (in chapters 1 and 5) are made to the events told in The Mystery of the Blue Train and it is clearly stated in chapter 1 that Peril at End House takes place the August following Poirot's trip to the French Riviera described in that book.
- In chapter 9, there is a remark in passing, on the cleverest type of crime, which later became the theme of Curtain: Poirot's Last Case, which ends with his death.
- At the beginning of chapter 14, Hastings describes how Poirot's obsession for tidiness helped him solve a case when he straightened ornaments on a mantelpiece. This is an indirect reference to The Mysterious Affair at Styles.
- In chapter 15, Poirot mentions the case "The Chocolate Box" included in the book Poirot's Early Cases, when he tells Commander Challenger that he indeed had failures in the past.
- In chapter 16, Inspector Japp asks Poirot if he had not retired to grow marrows. This is an indirect reference to the failed attempt at retirement depicted in The Murder of Roger Ackroyd, when Poirot settled in the small village of King's Abbot, only to be prompted to investigate a murder in the village.

== Allusions to actual history, geography and current science ==
- Transposed from Devon to Cornwall, the Majestic Hotel of the book is based on the Imperial Hotel in Torquay.
- In chapter seven, reference is made by the characters to a female aviator who went to Australia. This is an allusion to Amy Johnson who made the first solo flight from England to Australia by a woman from 5 May 1930 to 24 May 1930.
- The attempt by Michael Seton to fly solo around the world is a key element in the novel, which was released in 1932. At the time, the feat had never been achieved; in 1933, Wiley Post became the first aviator to circumnavigate the globe.

== Publication history ==
Dustjacket illustration of the UK First Edition (Book was first published in the US)

- 1932, Dodd Mead and Company (New York), February 1932, Hardcover, 270 pp
- 1932, Collins Crime Club (London), March 1932, Hardcover, 256 pp
- 1938, Modern Age Books (New York), Hardcover, 177 pp
- 1942, Pocket Books (New York), Paperback, (Pocket number 167), 240 pp
- 1948, Penguin Books, Paperback, (Penguin number 688), 204 pp
- 1961, Fontana Books (Imprint of HarperCollins), Paperback, 191 pp
- 1966, Pan books X521, Paperback
- 1978, Ulverscroft Large-print Edition, Hardcover, 327 pp, ISBN 0-7089-0153-0
- 2007, Facsimile edition (Facsimile of 1932 UK first edition), 2 April 2007, Hardcover, 256 pp ISBN 0-00-723439-2

The first true publication of the book was the US serialisation in the weekly Liberty magazine in eleven instalments from 13 June (Volume 8, Number 24) to 22 August 1931, (Volume 8, Number 34). There were slight abridgements to the text, no chapter divisions, and the reference in Chapter III to the character of Jim Lazarus as, "a Jew, of course, but a frightfully decent one" was deleted. The serialisation carried illustrations by W.D. Stevens. In the UK, the novel was serialised in the weekly Women's Pictorial magazine in eleven instalments from 10 October (Volume 22, Number 561) to 19 December 1931, (Volume 22, Number 571) under the slightly different title of The Peril at End House. There were slight abridgements and no chapter divisions. All of the instalments carried illustrations by Fred W. Purvis.

=== Book dedication ===
The dedication of the book reads:

To Eden Phillpotts. To whom I shall always be grateful for his friendship and the encouragement he gave me many years ago.

In 1908, Christie was recovering from influenza and bored, and she started to write a story at the suggestion of her mother, Clara Miller (see the dedication to The Mysterious Affair at Styles). This suggestion sparked Christie's interest in writing and several pieces were composed, some of which are now lost or remain unpublished (one exception to this is The Call of Wings which later appeared in The Hound of Death in 1933). These early efforts were mostly short stories, but at some point late in the year Christie attempted her first novel, Snow Upon the Desert. She sent it to several publishers but they all rejected the work. At Clara's suggestion she then asked Phillpotts to read and critique both the book and other examples of her writing. He was a neighbour and friend of the Miller family in Torquay. He sent an undated reply back which included the praise that, "some of your work is capital. You have a great feeling for dialogue". In view of her later success in allowing readers to judge characters' feelings and motivations for themselves (and in doing so, thereby deceiving themselves as to the identity of the culprits), Phillpotts offered valuable suggestions to, "leave your characters alone, so that they can speak for themselves, instead of always rushing in to tell them what they ought to say, or to explain to the reader what they mean by what they are saying". He gave her further advice in the letter regarding a number of suggestions for further reading to help improve her work.

Phillpotts gave Christie an introduction to his own literary agents, Hughes Massie, who rejected her work (although in the early 1920s, they did start to represent her). Undaunted, Christie attempted another story, now lost, called Being So Very Wilful, and again asked Phillpotts for his views. He replied on 9 February 1909 with a great deal more advice and tips for reading. In her autobiography, published posthumously in 1977, Christie wrote, "I can hardly express the gratitude I feel to him. He could so easily have uttered a few careless words of well-justified criticism and possibly discouraged me for life. As it was, he set out to help".

=== Dustjacket blurb ===
The blurb on the inside flap of the dustjacket of the UK first edition (which is also repeated opposite the title page) reads:

Three near escapes from death in three days! Is it accident or design? And then a fourth mysterious incident happens, leaving no doubt that some sinister hand is striking at Miss Buckley, the charming young owner of the mysterious End House. The fourth attempt, unfortunately for the would-be murderer, is made in the garden of a Cornish Riviera hotel where Hercule Poirot, the famous Belgian detective, is staying. Poirot immediately investigates the case and relentlessly unravels a murder mystery that must rank as one of the most brilliant that Agatha Christie has yet written.

== Adaptations ==
=== Stage ===
The story was adapted into a play by Arnold Ridley in 1940 and opened in the West End of London at the Vaudeville Theatre on 1 May. Poirot was played by Francis L. Sullivan.

=== Television and film ===
A Soviet film version, entitled Zagadka Endkhauza, was made in 1989 by Vadim Derbenyov, with Anatoly Ravikovich as Poirot.

The novel was adapted for television in 1990, as part of the Agatha Christie's Poirot second series; it was the first full-length novel to be adapted. Poirot was portrayed by David Suchet and Nick Buckley by Polly Walker. Overall, the film was faithful to the novel; however, Freddie's husband does not appear in the film nor does he shoot at Nick during the denouement, Challenger is arrested rather than being allowed to flee, and the fates of Freddie and Jim remain unresolved. Colonel Weston had been omitted from the adaptation and Miss Lemon added. This episode was filmed in Salcombe, Devon near Agatha Christie's home town of Torquay, rather than on the Cornish Coast where the story is set.

The novel was adapted as an episode of the Japanese animated series Agatha Christie's Great Detectives Poirot and Marple, under the title "The Mystery of End House". It aired in 2004.

The novel was again adapted as the fourth episode of the first season of the French television series Les Petits Meurtres d'Agatha Christie, airing in 2009.

The novel will be adapted for the third and fourth episodes of the upcoming series Hercule, starring Edward Bluemel as Poirot.

=== Radio ===
Peril at End House was adapted for radio by Michael Bakewell for BBC Radio 4 featuring John Moffatt as Poirot and Simon Williams as Captain Hastings.

=== Computer game ===
On 22 November 2007, Peril at End House, like Death on the Nile, was adapted into a PC game by Floodlight Games, and published as a joint venture between Oberon Games and Big Fish Games, with the player once again taking the role of Poirot as he searches End House and other areas in Cornwall Coast for clues, and questions suspects based on information he finds, this time through the clue cards he gains on the way. Two other titles developed by Floodlight Games were later released based on Christie's Dead Man's Folly and 4:50 from Paddington respectively.

=== Graphic novel ===
Peril at End House was released by HarperCollins as a graphic novel adaptation in 2008, adapted by Thierry Jollet and illustrated by Didier Quella-Guyot (ISBN 0-00-728055-6).
