= Hercule (TV series) =

Upcoming British television series

- Edward Bluemel as Hercule Poirot
- Genre: Mystery; Detective; Period drama
- Based on: Hercule Poirot by Agatha Christie
- Written by: Benji Walters
- Starring: Edward Bluemel
- Country of origin: United Kingdom
- Original language: English
- No. of episodes: 6

Production
- Executive producers: Benji Walters; Jonny Campbell; James Prichard; Rebecca Durbin; Damien Timmer; Nick Lambon; Robert Schildhouse; Jon Farrar; Stephen Nye
- Producer: Charlie Palmer
- Running time: 60 minutes
- Production companies: Mammoth Screen; Agatha Christie Limited.

Original release
- Network: BBC One/BBC iPlayer (UK); BritBox (North America)

Related
- Agatha Christie's Poirot

Hercule is an upcoming mystery television series, based on Agatha Christie's Hercule Poirot novels.

== Premise ==
The series centres on a younger version of the Belgian detective as he forges his career in interwar London, crosses swords with a new adversary, and is introduced to his future comrades Arthur Hastings and James Japp.

== Cast ==
- Edward Bluemel as Hercule Poirot
- Henry Ashton
- James D'Arcy
- Calvin Demba
- Phil Dunning
- Jack Gleeson
- Tamsin Greig
- James Nesbitt
- Guy Remmers
- Rebecca Rittenhouse
- Mawaan Rizwan
- Sandra Huggett
- Jessica Alexander
- Honor Swinton Byrne
- Omari Douglas
- Paul Forman
- Arthur Hughes
- Ralf Little
- River Medway
- Katherine Parkinson
- Natalie Quarry
- Toby Stephens

== Production ==
In late May 2026, it was reported that a new television adaptation of the Hercule Poirot novels was in development from Mammoth Screen, the production company responsible for ITV's Endeavour, Victoria and McDonald & Dodds, with the BBC set as the broadcaster. Executive producer Damien Timmer, who had previously worked on the long-running Agatha Christie's Poirot, joined the new programme as an executive producer, with the series to be scripted by Benji Walters. On June 8, the series was confirmed to be titled Hercule, with Edward Bluemel having won the lead role.

Jonny Campbell joined the project to executive produce and direct the first two episodes. Charlie Palmer was also named as the primary producer. Chanya Button and Alrick Riley were later confirmed to direct the remaining blocks. The series will consist of six 60 minute episodes covering three of the novels.

Ten further cast members were announced in August, including Jack Gleeson, James D'Arcy, Tamsin Grieg, James Nesbitt and Mawaan Rizwan. Production began later that month, with filming largely taking place in Liverpool and England's north-west area, including Bolton. In October, another ten cast additions were announced, including Omari Douglas, Ralf Little, Katherine Parkinson and Toby Stephens. In October, the second block filmed in Cornwall.

A commitment has reached for a potential run of at least three series.

Lord Edgware Dies will be the first book adapted for the series, followed by Peril at End House.

== Release ==
Hercule is expected to air on BBC One and BBC iPlayer in the latter end of 2027. BritBox will distribute the series in North America and Canada, while Fifth Season will handle the international release.

== Episodes ==
No.	Title	Directed by	Written by	Original release date
1	"Lord Edgware Dies: Part 1"	Jonny Campbell	Benji Walters	2027
2	"Lord Edgware Dies: Part 2"	Jonny Campbell	Benji Walters	2027
3	"Peril at End House: Part 1"	Chanya Button	Benji Walters	2027
4	"Peril at End House: Part 2"	Chanya Button	Benji Walters	2027
5	TBA	Alrick Riley	Benji Walters	2027
6	TBA	Alrick Riley	Benji Walters	2027
