= Black Work =

- DVD cover
- Created by: Matt Charman
- Directed by: Michael Samuels
- Starring: Sheridan Smith; Douglas Henshall; Kenny Doughty; Geraldine James; Matthew McNulty; Ace Bhatti
- Composer: Stuart Earl
- Country of origin: United Kingdom
- Original language: English
- No. of series: 1
- No. of episodes: 3

Production
- Executive producers: Peter Hampden; Hugo Heppell; Rebecca Keane; Damien Timmer
- Producer: Tom Mullens
- Production locations: Leeds, Yorkshire, England
- Cinematography: Gavin Finney
- Running time: 60 mins. (w/advertisements)
- Production companies: Mammoth Screen; LipSync Productions; Screen Yorkshire

Original release
- Network: ITV
- Release: 21 June – 5 July 2015

Black Work is a three-part British detective fiction thriller starring Sheridan Smith as police officer Jo Gillespie. The series, produced by Mammoth Screen in association with LipSync productions and Screen Yorkshire and directed by Michael Samuels, premiered on ITV on 21 June 2015, at 9pm, with two further episodes following. All three episodes are sixty minutes in length. The DVD of the series was released on 6 July 2015.

== Cast ==
- Sheridan Smith as P.C. Jo Gillespie
- Matthew McNulty as D.C Jack Clark
- Andrew Knott as D.C. Lee Miekel
- Ace Bhatti as D.C.I. Jahan Kapoor
- Geraldine James as Chief Constable Carolyn Jarecki
- Douglas Henshall as D.C.S. Will Hepburn
- Andrew Gower as D.C. Jared Ansell
- Kenny Doughty as D.S. Ryan Gillespie
- Phil Davis as D.I. Tom Piper
- Oliver Woollford as Hal Gillespie
- Honor Kneafsey as Melly Gillespie
- Lisa Dillon as Carla Gillespie
- Vinette Robinson as Zoe Nash
- Carla Henry as Vicki Stanton
- James Foster as Steve Glover

== Episodes ==
No.	Title	Directed by	Written by	Original release date	UK viewers (millions)
1	"Episode 1"	Michael Samuels	Matt Charman	21 June 2015	8.36
Jo Gillespie is dissatisfied that her husband Ryan, like herself, a police officer, spends so much time away from her and their children but resists colleague Jack Clark's suggestion that she leaves Ryan for him. She is doubly shocked to be told by Superintendent Hepburn not only that Ryan has been shot dead but had been working undercover - doing 'black work' - for three years without her knowledge. Most of the gang he was infiltrating have been arrested but Hepburn and Chief Constable Carolyn Jarecki are anxious not to publicize Ryan's murder lest it damage the prosecution and are puzzled as to why Ryan had not reported back to his handler for some days before his death. Jo is incensed by their attitude and tells his mother Barbara who leaks his murder to the press. Believing she has a clue to the killer Jo tells Jack but follows up her enquiry alone, landing herself in danger.
2	"Episode 2"	Michael Samuels	Matt Charman	28 June 2015	7.63
Jo pursues missing gang member Michael Parry to a cottage she learns about from a bugged conversation, and he is arrested, but Jo is amazed to learn that Ryan bought the cottage without telling her. She also believes Parry may have been framed. Following Ryan's funeral she meets his handler Tom Piper, who advises her not to question her husband's death - increasing her suspicions of a cover-up, especially after she spies on him. Jo visits Parry in custody, unofficially, but is accused of jeopardizing the enquiry and suspended from duty. Then she gets an even bigger shock as she learns that Ryan certainly did lead a double life.
3	"Episode 3"	Michael Samuels	Matt Charman	5 July 2015	7.63
Devastated to discover that Ryan had bought the cottage for his mistress of three years and their child, Jo is also told that Parry's girlfriend, Sian, was murdered just before Ryan was slain. She tracks down Tom Piper, who tells her that Sian blew Ryan's cover and Chief Constable Jarecki was aware of this but did not pull him out of the operation. A paranoid Jo is now suspicious of all her police colleagues, particularly Jack, who appears to be far less innocent than she thought although it is Jack who eventually saves her from the real killer.
