= Lord Edgware Dies =

1933 mystery novel by Agatha Christie

- Dust-jacket illustration of the first UK edition
- Author: Agatha Christie
- Cover artist: Lambart
- Language: English
- Series: Hercule Poirot
- Genre: Crime novel
- Publisher: Collins Crime Club
- Publication date: September 1933
- Publication place: United Kingdom
- Media type: Print (hardback & paperback)
- Pages: 256 (first edition, hardcover)
- Preceded by: Peril at End House
- Followed by: Murder on the Orient Express

Lord Edgware Dies is a mystery novel by British writer Agatha Christie, published in the UK by the Collins Crime Club in September 1933 and in the US by Dodd, Mead and Company later in the same year under the title of Thirteen at Dinner. Before its book publication, the novel was serialised in six issues (March–August 1933) of The American Magazine as 13 For Dinner.

The novel features Hercule Poirot, Arthur Hastings and Chief Inspector Japp. An American actress married to Lord Edgware asks Poirot to aid her in getting a divorce from her husband. Poirot agrees to help her, meeting her husband. That evening, the actress is seen at a dinner with thirteen guests, which has an associated superstition. By the next morning Lord Edgware and another American actress are found murdered, each at their own homes. Poirot investigates.

The novel was well received at publication, in both London and New York, noting the clue that came from the chance remark of a stranger, calling it ingenious. A later review called it clever and unusual.

== Plot summary ==
Attending a performance by impressionist Carlotta Adams, Hercule Poirot is approached by actress Jane Wilkinson. She requests his help in asking her husband, Lord Edgware, to divorce her. Although a Catholic, Poirot agrees but learns from Edgware that he already agreed to a divorce and sent his wife a letter confirming this; Wilkinson denies receiving it. The following morning, Inspector Japp informs Poirot and his friend Arthur Hastings that Edgware had been murdered at his home in Regent Gate the previous evening, stabbed in the neck. While Wilkinson was witnessed by Edgware's butler and his secretary visiting her husband that night, a morning newspaper reveals she attended a dinner party the same evening, and other guests confirm this. Poirot soon becomes concerned for Adams' safety, recalling she could impersonate Wilkinson. Adams is found dead that same morning from an overdose of Veronal.

Seeking answers, Poirot notes a few facts: Bryan Martin, a former lover of Wilkinson before she met the wealthy Duke of Merton, bitterly describes her as an amoral person; Donald Ross, a guest at the party, witnessed her take a telephone call from someone that night; Adams possessed a pair of pince-nez, along with a gold case that contained the drug, which has a puzzling inscription in it; Edgware's nephew, Ronald Marsh, had been cut off from his allowance by his uncle three months earlier; a sum of francs formerly in Edgware's possession has disappeared, along with the butler. Learning Adams had sent a letter to her sister in America before her death, Poirot makes a request for it. A copy is sent via telegram, revealing Adams was offered $10,000 for an undisclosed endeavour. Poirot suspects she was hired to impersonate Wilkinson.

Japp soon arrests Marsh, based on this letter. Marsh denies hiring Adams or killing his uncle but states that he and his cousin Geraldine went to Regent Gate on the night of the murder, where he spotted a man looking like Martin entering the house, although Geraldine did not as she was retrieving something for him. Poirot later receives the original letter in the post and notes some oddities with it. Hastings attends a luncheon party along with Wilkinson and Ross, in which the guests talk about Paris of Troy. Wilkinson presumes they are talking of the French capital and begins discussing fashion. Ross, puzzled by this, considering how clever Wilkinson had been the last time he met her, confides his concerns to Hastings. He later telephones Poirot but is fatally stabbed before he can explain in detail. Seeking a theory, Poirot overhears a chance remark from a crowd leaving a theatre, which leads him to talk with Ellis, Wilkinson's maid.

Gathering the suspects together, Poirot reveals that the killer in all three murders is Jane Wilkinson. Her motive in killing Lord Edgware is that the devout Duke of Merton would not marry a divorced woman. A widow, however, is a different matter. She recruited Adams to impersonate her at the dinner party, while she killed her husband, and then killed Adams afterwards with a fatal dose of Veronal. The women met at a hotel to exchange clothing before and after the party. While waiting for Adams to return from the party, Wilkinson discovers a letter among Adams's belongings that had yet to be posted and tampers with the letter to implicate the last man it mentions for the murders. Ross was killed because he realised that Wilkinson did not attend the dinner party; her ignorance of Greek mythology gave her away, as Adams had been knowledgeable on the subject and thus talked about it while impersonating her.

Poirot reveals what led him to his theory: Wilkinson lied about receiving her husband's letter and used Poirot to prove she had no motive for his murder; the telephone call to Adams was to confirm if their deception had yet to be exposed; the pince-nez, belonging to Ellis, used in a disguise that she and Wilkinson wore to keep their hotel meetings secret; the gold case was created a week before the murder, not six months as its inscription implied – Wilkinson had it made under a false name and then sent Ellis to collect it; a corner of a page in Adams' letter was torn by Wilkinson, changing the word "she" to "he", to imply that a man hired Adams. Poirot reveals that the butler stole the missing money; Marsh had witnessed him entering Regent Gate to hide it elsewhere; his disappearance was because he panicked when the police sought another suspect.

Wilkinson is arrested and writes to Poirot from prison about wishing an audience for her hanging, surprisingly evincing no anger at being foiled by him – nor any remorse.

== Characters ==
- Hercule Poirot – The famed Belgian detective. Drawn into the case, after being asked by Wilkinson to aid her in getting a divorce from her husband.
- Captain Hastings – Poirot's friend and assistant on the case. He is the narrator of the story.
- Inspector Japp – The investigating officer for the case.
- Lord Edgware – The first victim of the case. A wealthy English peer married to Jane Wilkinson. Known for his harsh personality and implied sadism, who is a noted collector of objets d'art.
- Carlotta Adams – An American impersonator conducting a tour in London and Paris. Hired to impersonate Edgware's wife by an unknown employer.
- Donald Ross – A young actor who attends the dinner party Wilkinson joins.
- Jane Wilkinson – A beautiful but amoral American actress and Edgware's estranged wife.
- Geraldine Marsh – Edgware's daughter from his first marriage.
- Captain Ronald Marsh – Edgware's nephew and heir to his title.
- Genevieve "Jenny" Driver – Adams' friend in London.
- Bryan Martin – A successful actor who worked with Wilkinson and was recently in love with her.
- Miss Carroll – Edgware's secretary.
- Alton – Edgware's butler.
- Ellis – Wilkinson's personal maid at her new accommodation.
- Duke of Merton – A devout Roman Catholic, and the current love of Jane Wilkinson, whom he plans to marry.
- Dowager Duchess of Merton – The Duke's mother, vehemently opposed to his planned marriage to Jane Wilkinson.

== Alternative title ==
Lord Edgware Dies is alternatively titled Thirteen at Dinner. This second title, used on American editions, arises from a superstition that sitting down thirteen to dinner means bad luck to the person who first leaves the table. The dinner at which Carlotta successfully impersonated Jane Wilkinson had an unexpected missing guest, leaving them thirteen instead of the invited fourteen. The superstition weighs heavily on young actor Donald Ross, but plays out for both him and Jane Wilkinson, and her impersonator.

== Literary significance and reception ==
The Times Literary Supplement of 21 September 1933 reviewed the book positively, commenting on the fact that "it was the chance remark of a stranger in the street that put him on the right track. Three such murders, however, are enough to tax the powers of the most superhuman sleuth, and we do not grudge him one stroke of good fortune."

Isaac Anderson concluded his review in the 24 September 1933 issue of The New York Times Book Review by saying, "This story presents a most ingenious crime puzzle and a still more ingenious solution, all set forth with the consummate skill of which Agatha Christie is mistress."

Robert Barnard: "Deals with a social/artistic milieu rather off Christie's usual beat: aristocrats, actresses, socialites, rich Jews. The anti-Semitism is more muted than in the early thrillers, but still leaves a nasty taste (this is the last book in which it obtrudes). Otherwise clever and unusual, with the Hastings/Poirot relationship done less crudely than usual."

== References to other works ==
In chapter 19, the Duchess of Merton tells Poirot that Lady Yardly had told her about him. Lady Yardly had previously appeared in the short story, "The Adventure of the Western Star" from the Poirot Investigates collection.

== References to actual history, geography and current science ==
The character of Carlotta Adams was based on the American dramatist Ruth Draper (1884–1956). In her Autobiography, Christie says, "I thought how clever she was and how good her impersonations were; the wonderful way she could transform herself from a nagging wife to a peasant girl kneeling in a cathedral. Thinking about her led me to the book Lord Edgware Dies.” Draper was also the inspiration for a character in the short story "The Dead Harlequin", published in The Mysterious Mr. Quin (1930), where the character was called Aspasia Glen and was the murderer's accomplice, rather than the victim.

In Chapter 7, Chief Inspector Japp mentions the Elizabeth Canning case which was a real kidnapping case that occurred in London in 1753. The case created a sensation at the time due to the inconsistencies in the victim's declarations and the alibis of the perpetrators. Japp mentions this case due to the peculiar fact that the suspect was seen at two places at the same time. In the novel Lady Edgware was seen at a dinner party at the same time that she was also seen visiting the victim. Similarly, in the Canning case the suspect, Mary Squires, was seen travelling at the time that Elizabeth Canning said that she had been imprisoned by her.

== Adaptations ==
=== Radio ===
John Moffatt starred as Poirot in a five-part BBC Radio 4 adaptation by Michael Bakewell directed by Enyd Williams and also starring Simon Williams as Captain Hastings and Nicola Pagett as Jane Wilkinson.

=== Film ===
The novel was first adapted in 1934 as an eighty-minute film directed by Henry Edwards for Real Art Productions. The film was the third to star Austin Trevor in the role of Poirot after his appearances in Alibi and Black Coffee, both in 1931.

=== Television ===
1985 adaptation

The novel was first adapted for television as an eighty-seven-minute film in 1985, under the American version's title Thirteen at Dinner. It starred Peter Ustinov in one of his six appearances as Hercule Poirot, David Suchet as Chief Inspector Japp, and co-starred Faye Dunaway in the dual role of Jane Wilkinson and Carlotta Adams. The adaptation updated the setting of the story to contemporary times, rather than within the 1930s.

2000 adaptation

A second television adaptation of Lord Edgware Dies was created in 2000, as an episode for the series Agatha Christie's Poirot on 19 February 2000. It starred David Suchet in the role of Hercule Poirot, and was produced by Carnival Films. While remaining faithful to most of the plot of the novel, it featured a number of changes.

Adaptor: Anthony Horowitz
Director: Brian Farnham

Cast:

- David Suchet as Hercule Poirot
- Hugh Fraser as Captain Arthur Hastings
- Philip Jackson as Chief Inspector Japp
- Pauline Moran as Miss Lemon
- Helen Grace as Jane Wilkinson/Lady Edgware
- John Castle as Lord Edgware
- Fiona Allen as Carlotta Adams
- Dominic Guard as Bryan Martin
- Fenella Woolgar as Ellis
- Deborah Cornelius as Penny Driver
- Hannah Yelland as Geraldine Marsh
- Tim Steed as Ronald Marsh
- Lesley Nightingale as Miss Carroll
- Christopher Guard as Alton
- Iain Fraser as Donald Ross
- Virginia Denham as Alice

2012 French television adaptation

A third television adaption of the novel was made as an episode for the French series Les Petits Meurtres d'Agatha Christie ("The Little Murders of Agatha Christie") on 14 September 2012, under the title "Le couteau sur la nuque" ("The Knife on the Neck"). The adaptation changed the setting to a theatre in the city of Amiens, France, in the 1950s, made changes in a number of characters – Christie's detectives were replaced by Commissaire Larosière (Antoine Duléry) and his clumsy assistant, Inspecteur Lampion (Marius Colluci), while the killer is glamorous actress Sarah Morlant (Maruschka Detmers), and the victim is Morlant's inconvenient husband, fellow actor Pierre Fougère (Jean-Marie Winling) – and featured an additional murder subplot involving the theatre's concierge.

2027 adaptation

The novel will be the first book adapted for the upcoming series Hercule, starring Edward Bluemel as Poirot.

== Publication history ==
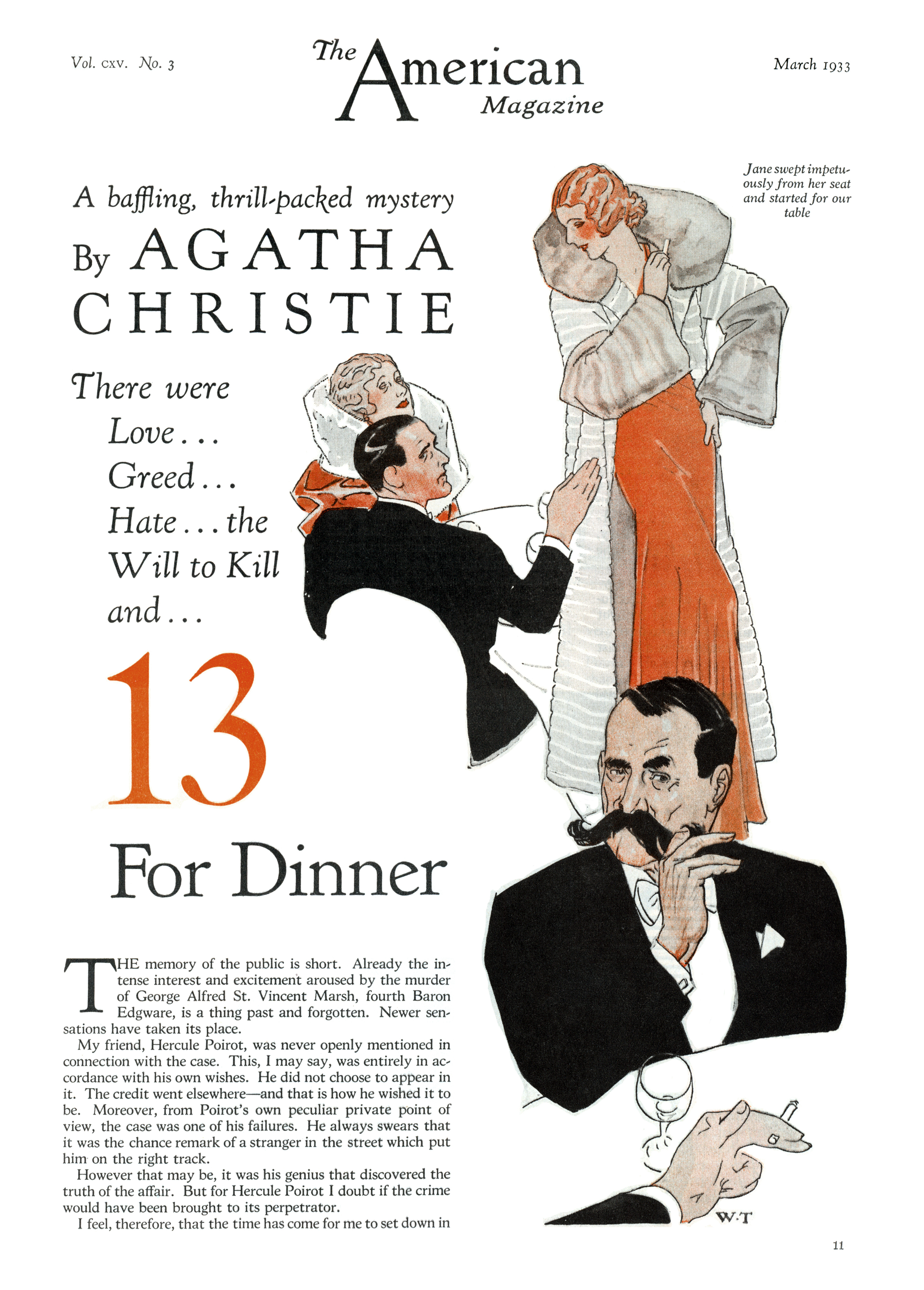
Weldon Trench illustrated the first appearance of the novel in The American Magazine (March 1933)

- 1933, The American Magazine, serialised in six issues (March–August 1933) as 13 For Dinner

Illustrations by Weldon Trench

- 1933, Collins Crime Club (London), September 1933, Hardcover, 256 pp

The UK edition retailed at seven shillings and sixpence (7/6).

- 1933, Dodd Mead and Company (New York), 1933, Hardcover, 305 pp

The US edition retailed at $2.00.

- 1944, Dell Books (New York), Paperback, (Dell number 60 [mapback]), 224 pp
- 1948, Penguin Books, Paperback, (Penguin number 685), 251 pp
- 1954, Fontana Books (Imprint of HarperCollins), Paperback, 192 pp
- 1969, Greenway edition of collected works (William Collins), Hardcover
- 1970, Greenway edition of collected works (Dodd Mead), Hardcover, 255 pp
- 1970, Ulverscroft Large-print Edition, Hardcover, 380 pp; ISBN 0-85456-479-9
- 2007, Poirot Facsimile Edition (Facsimile of 1933 UK first edition), 5 February 2007, Hardcover, 256 pp; ISBN 0-00-724022-8

=== Book dedication ===
The dedication of the book reads:
To Dr. and Mrs. Campbell Thompson

Reginald Campbell Thompson (21 August 1876 – 23 May 1941), married to Barbara, was an eminent British archaeologist and the second expedition leader to employ Christie's husband Max Mallowan to work on one of his digs. The offer of work came in 1930 when Mallowan's employer, Leonard Woolley, was proving difficult over his proposed marriage to Agatha and their wish that she should join her husband on the dig at Ur although the real opposition came from Leonard Woolley's difficult wife, Katharine (see the dedication to The Thirteen Problems). Thompson's dig was at Nineveh and Max joined the team there in September 1931 followed the next month by Agatha. The invitation was only confirmed after the Mallowans had joined Thompson for a weekend in the country near Oxford where they were subjected to a cross-country scramble on "the wettest day possible over rough country" followed by another test to ensure that neither Agatha nor Max were fussy eaters. These were to ensure that both could withstand the rigours of a season in the wilds of Iraq. Used to walking over Dartmoor and having a very healthy appetite, Agatha passed the tests with flying colours.

The relationship between the Mallowans and the Thompsons was far more relaxed than it had been with the Woolleys. The only source of contention was that Thompson was notoriously frugal with money and questioned every expense. Horses were a vital part of the expedition but Thompson only bought poor, badly-trained animals. He nevertheless insisted that Max ride them with skill since to fall off one would mean that "not a single workman will have a scrap of respect for you". Christie's clash with Thompson regarding this facet of his character was over her insistence on purchasing a solid table to place her typewriter on in order that she could complete her next book. Not seeing why she couldn't use orange boxes, Thompson was aghast at her personal expenditure of ten pounds on a table at a local bazaar (although Max's recollection in his own memoir was that three pounds was the sum) and he took some two weeks to recover his temper over this 'extravagance'. After this though, he made frequent polite enquiries over the progress of the book, Lord Edgware Dies, which was dedicated to him and his wife. A skeleton found on the dig was named 'Lord Edgware'. A singular honour that Christie bestowed on the Thompsons was to read aloud the manuscript of the book to them, something that she normally only ever did to her family (See External Links below).

=== Dustjacket blurb ===
The blurb on the inside flap of the dustjacket of the first edition (which is also repeated opposite the title page) reads: "Supper at the Savoy! Hercule Poirot, the famous little detective, was enjoying a pleasant little supper party there as the guest of Lady Edgware, formerly Jane Wilkinson, a beautiful young American actress. During the conversation Lady Edgware speaks of the desirability of getting rid of her husband. Lord Edgware, since he refuses to divorce her, and she wants to marry the Duke of Merton. M. Poirot jocularly replies that getting rid of husbands is not his speciality. Within twenty-four hours, however, Lord Edgware dies. This amazing story once more reveals Agatha Christie as the perfect teller of Detective stories. It will be difficult indeed to lay down the book until one learns the true solution of the mystery."
