= The ABC Murders (TV series) =

2018 British television series

- Genre: Mystery; Drama; Thriller
- Based on: The A.B.C. Murders by Agatha Christie
- Written by: Sarah Phelps
- Directed by: Alex Gabassi
- Starring: John Malkovich; Rupert Grint; Andrew Buchan; Eamon Farren; Jack Farthing; Gregor Fisher; Tara Fitzgerald; Henry Goodman; Shirley Henderson; Bronwyn James; Freya Mavor; Kevin McNally
- Composer: Isobel Waller-Bridge
- Country of origin: United Kingdom
- Original language: English
- No. of series: 1
- No. of episodes: 3

Production
- Executive producers: Basi Akpabio; James Prichard; Elizabeth Kilgarriff; Damien Timmer; Sarah Phelps; Helen Ziegler
- Producer: Farah Abushwesha
- Cinematography: Joel Devlin
- Editors: Simon Brasse; Rob Hall
- Production companies: Mammoth Screen; Agatha Christie Productions

Original release
- Network: BBC One; BBC One HD
- Release: 26 December – 28 December 2018

The ABC Murders is a 2018 mystery thriller series loosely based on Agatha Christie's 1936 novel of the same name. It was broadcast over three consecutive nights beginning on 26 December 2018 on BBC One. It was adapted by Sarah Phelps and directed by Alex Gabassi. It stars John Malkovich as Hercule Poirot, with Rupert Grint, Andrew Buchan, Tara Fitzgerald and Shirley Henderson.

The series was released on DVD through Universal Pictures UK on 11 March 2019.

== Cast ==
=== Main ===
- John Malkovich as Hercule Poirot
- Rupert Grint as Inspector Crome
- Andrew Buchan as Franklin Clarke
- Eamon Farren as Alexander Bonaparte Cust
- Jack Farthing as Donald Fraser
- Gregor Fisher as Dexter Dooley
- Tara Fitzgerald as Lady Hermione Clarke
- Henry Goodman as Sidney Prynne
- Shirley Henderson as Rose Marbury
- Bronwyn James as Megan Barnard
- Freya Mavor as Thora Grey
- Kevin McNally as Inspector Japp
- Michael Shaeffer as Sergeant Yelland

=== Supporting ===
- Eve Austin as Betty Barnard
- Anya Chalotra as Lily Marbury
- Lizzy McInnerny as Jenny Barnard
- Cyril Nri as Father Anselm
- Suzanne Packer as Capstick
- Christopher Villiers as Sir Carmichael Clarke
- Shane Attwooll as Detective Bunce
- Terenia Edwards as Miss Leigh
- Tamzin Griffin as Alice Asher
- Neil Hurst as Benny Grew
- Ian Pirie as Peter Asher
- Karen Westwood as Mrs Kirkham
- Lorenzo Harani as Refugee Man

== Production ==
=== Locations ===
Various cities, towns and villages in the historic county of Yorkshire in the north of England, including Grosmont and the North Yorkshire Moors Railway, Leeds, Pickering, Ripon, Saltaire, Skelton-on-Ure and Wakefield, played key roles as settings for this adaptation. Newby Hall in North Yorkshire is the mansion at Churston. The De La Warr Pavilion at Bexhill-on-Sea in East Sussex is also featured.

== Episodes ==
| No. | Title | Directed by | Written by | Original release date | UK viewers (millions) |
|---|---|---|---|---|---|
| 1 | "Episode 1" | Alex Gabassi | Sarah Phelps | 26 December 2018 | 8.65 |
Poirot has been receiving letters signed A.B.C., taunting him and predicting murders. According to the letters, the first killing is due to occur in Andover on 31 March. Poirot passes the letters to the police, but Inspector Crome, who has replaced Poirot's former contact Inspector Japp, dismisses them as an April Fools prank. When Alice Asher is found murdered in Andover, quickly followed by Betty Barnard in Bexhill (an open ABC railway guide being left by each body), Crome is forced to take the letters more seriously. Suspicious of Poirot, and believing him to have been untruthful about his occupation in his native Belgium before he arrived in England as a refugee during the Great War, Crome confiscates Poirot's papers and searches his apartment. A down-on-his-luck travelling stocking salesman named Alexander Bonaparte Cust was nearby at the time of both murders.
| 2 | "Episode 2" | Alex Gabassi | Sarah Phelps | 27 December 2018 | 7.03 |
Poirot is passed another letter from A.B.C. by a neighbour who received it in error. It states that the next murder will take place at Churston, a country house owned by Sir Carmichael Clarke that Poirot had previously attended as a guest. He telephones the house, but is too late: Sir Carmichael has already been killed. It seems that Poirot himself may be the connection between the locations, as they are all places he has been, with the exception of Andover. He re-visits Churston, and is asked by Sir Carmichael's brother Franklin to investigate; matters are complicated by the serious illness of Sir Carmichael's widow Lady Hermione Clarke, who is believed to be near death. Another letter indicates that Doncaster is to be the next location; A.B.C. signs it "Giddy-Up", leading Crome to believe that a murder will take place at Doncaster Racecourse. In fact, the intended victim is a ventriloquist named Dexter Dooley, but the murderer mistakenly kills the wrong man. Once again, Cust is nearby.
| 3 | "Episode 3" | Alex Gabassi | Sarah Phelps | 28 December 2018 | 6.93 |
Ernie Edwards is stabbed to death in the men's public toilets at Embsay railway station. Cust lies unconscious on the floor nearby, with a knife in his hand. Coming round, he flees the scene. Poirot finds a pack of stockings in the victim's suitcase and, after visiting the stocking manufacturer, discovers the identity of the salesman. The police visit Cust's lodgings where they find a typewriter and copies of the ABC railway guide. Cust is arrested. Franklin Clarke thanks Poirot for apprehending the murderer of his brother, and joins him in taking a brandy. Poirot, however, secretly doubts Cust's guilt, in spite of the apparently overwhelming evidence against him: doctors have discovered that Cust has a brain tumour that causes him to suffer debilitating headaches, seizures and blackouts. Franklin Clarke is arrested for the murders. Poirot realises that it was he who had set Cust up with the stocking salesman job. He had posed as a representative of the manufacturer, provided Cust with a typewriter, and wrote regularly to 'help' the novice salesman with instructions on exactly where he should travel to by train in order to make sales. Franklin's aim had been to ensure the death of his brother before that of Lady Hermione so that he, as next in line, would inherit the title and estate. He was trapped by his fingerprints on the brandy glass that match prints found on the typewriter. Franklin is hanged for the murders. In a flashback to Belgium during the war, it is revealed that that Poirot had been a priest whose congregation had been murdered in the church by advancing soldiers during the Rape of Belgium.

== Reception ==
The review aggregator Rotten Tomatoes gave the series an approval rating of 70% based on 30 reviews, The website's critical consensus reads, "The ABC Murders liberally adapts the famed Agatha Christie mystery while retaining its thrilling spirit, thanks in part to the sly performance of John Malkovich, who inhabits Hercule Poirot with enough wizened panache to win over those who were skeptical of his casting." On Metacritic, the film holds a weighted average score of 58 out of 100, based on 10 critics, indicating "mixed or average" reviews.

The Guardian awarded the first episode four stars and praised Malkovich's performance. The Times awarded four stars and found it enjoyable, also praising Malkovich. Reviewing the finale, Metro praised Poirot's new backstory and declared it "mystery television at its finest".
