= The Big Four (novel) =

1927 mystery novel by Agatha Christie

- Dust-jacket illustration of the first UK edition
- Author: Agatha Christie
- Cover artist: Thomas Derrick
- Language: English
- Series: Hercule Poirot
- Genre: Crime novel
- Publisher: William Collins & Sons
- Publication date: 27 January 1927
- Publication place: United Kingdom
- Media type: Print (hardback & paperback)
- Pages: 282 (first edition, hardback)
- Preceded by: The Murder of Roger Ackroyd
- Followed by: The Mystery of the Blue Train
- Text: The Big Four at Wikisource

The Big Four is a mystery novel by the English writer Agatha Christie, first published in the UK by William Collins & Sons on 27 January 1927 and in the US by Dodd, Mead and Company later in the same year. It features Hercule Poirot, Arthur Hastings, and Inspector Japp. The UK edition retailed at seven shillings and sixpence (7/6) and the US edition at $2.00.

The structure of the novel is different from other Poirot stories, as it began from twelve short stories (eleven in the US) that had been separately published. This is a tale of international intrigue and espionage, therefore opening up the possibility of more spy fiction from Christie.

== Development ==
In 1926 Christie was already deeply affected by the death of her mother earlier in the year and the breakdown of her marriage to Archibald Christie. Her brother-in-law, Campbell Christie, suggested that, rather than undergo the strain of composing a completely new novel, Christie should merely compile her most recent series of Poirot stories into a full length book. Campbell helped her revise the stories, which had been written for The Sketch, into a more coherent form for book publication. His assistance mainly took the form of revising the beginnings and ends of the stories to make them flow better into a novel – the substance of each story remains the same between the short story version and the novel version. Unlike the later Partners in Crime (1929), the order of the stories was retained.

Around this time, a novel was offered for publication to The Bodley Head and was rejected. No other information exists on this novel, but James Zemboy suggests it was The Big Four. His theory continues with Christie's relationship to her new publisher William Collins, Sons. Christie would have realized that The Big Four was an inferior novel and went to work writing The Murder of Roger Ackroyd for the new publisher.

The book was published a few weeks after the disappearance and reappearance of Christie and the resulting publicity over her name caused it to become a sales hit although it was not a traditional murder mystery but a tale of international intrigue and espionage. The way was opened for the possibility of more spy fiction from Christie and sales were good enough to more than double the success of The Murder of Roger Ackroyd.

In 1942, Christie wrote to her agent, Edmund Cork of Hughes Massie, asking him to keep a manuscript in reserve (probably Sleeping Murder) and stated

I have been, once, in a position where I wanted to write just for the sake of money coming in and when I felt I couldn't – it is a nerve wracking feeling. If I had had one MS 'up my sleeve' it would have made a big difference. That was the time I had to produce that rotten book The Big Four and had to force myself in The Mystery of the Blue Train.

== Plot summary ==
An unexpected visitor called Mayerling comes in through Hercule Poirot's bedroom and collapses on the floor. The only clue to what he wants is his repeating Poirot's name and address and writing the number 4, many times. When Hastings jokingly calls it "The Mystery of the Big Four," the man begins speaking about an international crime cartel of that name. He describes the four leaders: Number 1 is a Chinese political mastermind named Li Chang Yen; Number 2 is probably American; Number 3 is a Frenchwoman; and Number 4 is known only as "the Destroyer." The man dies soon after Poirot and Hastings go off on the trail of the Big Four.

From here, the novel becomes a series of loosely connected short stories.

- Poirot and Hastings visit an informant, John Ingles, to ask him about the Big Four. Ingles shows Poirot a note from a fisherman who asked him for a few hundred pounds to hide himself from the Big Four. Poirot, Hastings and Ingles discover that the man who wrote the note, a Mr Jonathan Whalley, has been murdered by Number 4.
- Poirot discovers that the Big Four have produced a form of wireless energy capable of focusing a beam of great intensity on any spot. A British scientist called Halliday was near success on this same concept when he was kidnapped while at a conference in France. Poirot and Hastings visit the notable French scientist Madame Olivier and discover she is Number 3.
- Poirot discovers that American millionaire Abe Ryland is Number 2 and sends Hastings to spy on him.
- Poirot investigates the death of a Mr Paynter in Worcestershire. Before his death, Paynter had written in ink "yellow jasmine" on his newspaper, and attempted to draw a number 4. Poirot reveals that Paynter's attending physician, a Doctor Quentin, was in fact Number 4, who gave Paynter an injection of yellow jasmine.
- A month later, Japp informs Poirot of another mysterious death—that of chess grandmaster Gilmour Wilson, who died from heart failure while participating in a match with Russian refugee Doctor Savaronoff. Poirot deduces that the real Savaronoff died in Russia and that Number Four impersonated him, killing Wilson in order to preserve his cover.
- Hastings is kidnapped by the Big Four and Poirot saves him.
- Poirot identifies Number 4 as an obscure character actor called Claude Darrell. A former girlfriend reveals Darrell's identifying quirks.
- In order to track the Big Four in secret, Poirot stages his own death. He and Hastings travel to the Big Four's mountain hideout in Italy and are taken captive. Poirot reveals that he is not Hercule Poirot, but his twin brother, Achille. He tells the Big Four that the mountain has been cordoned off and the police are on the scene. Three of the Big Four are killed in an explosion just as the police raid the hideout. The other is reported to have committed suicide. Back home, Poirot reveals Achille Poirot did not exist – it was Hercule Poirot in disguise all along. He laments that all his other cases will seem boring and tame compared to this case. The novel ends with Hastings returning to Argentina and Poirot considering retirement.

== Characters ==
=== Main ===
- Hercule Poirot. The famous private investigator. Having tired of his life in England and dealing with trivial matters, he is tempted to move to Brazil. He has received a monetary offer too good to refuse.
- Arthur Hastings. Poirot's sidekick in two earlier novels and two short stories. He briefly works as a secretary of Abe Ryland under the alias Arthur Nevill.
- Inspector Japp. He is an inspector of Scotland Yard.

=== The Big Four ===
A multiethnic gang of four persons working towards world domination. They have a secret hideaway in a quarry of the Dolomites. It is owned by an Italian company, which is a front company for Abe Ryland. The quarry conceals a vast subterranean base, hollowed out in the heart of the mountain. From there they use Wireless communications to transfer orders to thousands of their followers across many countries. The characters comprise typical ethnic and national stereotypes of 1920s British fiction. They are:

- Abe Ryland – Number Two, the so-called American Soap King. He is stated to be richer than John D. Rockefeller and being the richest man in the world. Early in the novel, Ryland attempts to hire Poirot and invites him to Rio de Janeiro, allegedly to investigate the goings-on in a big company there. Poirot is offered a fortune and is tempted to accept. He eventually declines and the plot point is no longer elaborated. Presumably Ryland intended to recruit him for the organization. He dies when the hidden base of the Four explodes. He represents the power of wealth.
- Madame Olivier – Number Three, a French woman scientist. She is stated to be a famous nuclear physicist and analytical chemist. Poirot suspects that she has kept secret the true extent of her research with nuclear power. He believes that she has "succeeded in liberating atomic energy and harnessing it to her purpose". She is said to have used gamma rays emitted by radium to perfect a lethal weapon. She is a widow. She used to work with her husband, conducting their research in common until his death. She is said to look more like a priestess out of the past than a modern woman. She dies when the hidden base of the Four explodes. She represents scientific research devoted to political goals.
- Li Chang Yen – Number One, the Chinese leader and mastermind of the group, said to have the finest criminal brain ever known. He is an unseen character who never sets foot out of China, but is discussed often by other characters. He controls a "scientific force more powerful than the world has dreamed of". It is said that "the men who loom most largely in the public eye are men of little or no personality. They are marionettes who dance to the wires pulled by a master hand, and that hand is Li Chang Yen's". He is the power behind the throne of the East. He is said to be behind the October Revolution in Russia, Lenin and Trotsky being his puppets. He is the embodiment of Yellow Peril. His plots are said to include worldwide unrest, labour disputes in every nation, and revolutions in some of them. Elsewhere it is explained that he is a mandarin and lives in a palace of his own in Peking. He oversees human subject research on coolies, with no regard for the death and suffering of his research subjects. He commits suicide at the end.
- Claude Darrell – Number Four, known as the Destroyer. He is an obscure English actor and a master of disguise. He is the chief assassin of the group. He appears with ever-changing faces and multiple identities throughout the novel. He can totally transform his physical appearance and his persona. Many of the novel's characters are known or suspected to be among the roles Darrell plays. Darrell is described as being around 33 years old, brown-haired, having a fair complexion, gray-eyed. His height is given at 5 ft 10 in (1.78 meters). His origins are mysterious. Darrell has one weakness that can give his real identity away: when he dines, Darrell habitually dabs a piece of bread on the table to pick up crumbs. He apparently dies when the hidden base of the Four explodes, though his body is unrecognisable. He is also effectively a spy and represents the secret services and intelligence agencies.

=== Others ===
These characters are described by Zemboy. Most are also described by Bunson.

- Achille Poirot, Hercule's supposed twin brother. Achille lacks a mustache and is described by Hercule as being less handsome. Achille is later revealed to be Hercule Poirot himself in disguise. (Modeled on Mycroft Holmes, brother of Sherlock Holmes. )
- Countess Vera Rossakoff. A flamboyant, eccentric and devious Russian aristocrat who currently has no personal fortune. She is employed as a secretary by Madame Olivier under the alias Inez Véroneau. She is both a friend and an adversary to Poirot.
- Joseph Aarons. A theatrical agent who helps Poirot identify actor Claude Darrell.
- John Halliday. A scientist who visited Paris for a conference and disappeared.
- John Ingles. A retired civil servant of reportedly mediocre intellect. He is an expert on China and all things Chinese. He informs Poirot of the identity of Li Chang Yen.
- Mr Mayerling. A former member of the Secret Service and a victim of the Big Four. He dies in Poirot's apartment.
- Inspector Meadows. A representative of the Moretonhampstead police who investigates the death of Jonathan Whalley. He is an old friend of Inspector Japp who has recommended Poirot to him. He is willing to have Poirot involved in the case.
- Flossie Monro. An old friend of Claude Darrell. She has bleached blonde hair and a fondness for rouge and monogrammed shirts. She provides to Poirot information about a personal habit to Darrell that can be used to identify him, regardless of his disguise.
- Gerald Paynter. Nephew and heir to Mr Paynter. He is an artist, described as being "wild and extravagant". Inspector Japp finds him typical for an artist. He inherits the estate of his deceased uncle.
- Dr Savaronoff. The world's second-best chess player. Number Four masquerades as him in London, where he is challenged to a game by an American champion.
- Mr Templeton. An older gentleman whose nurse suspects that he is being poisoned. Poirot realises that his son is actually Number Four.
- Jonathan Whalley. Another victim of the Big Four. He is murdered in his own residence, Granite Bungalow in the village of Hoppaton, Devon. He had written to John Ingles, requesting money to escape from the Big Four.
- Gilmour Wilson. A youthful American chess champion. He challenged Dr Savaronoff to a game and died while playing.

== Analysis ==
Jerry Speir points out that the novel departs from the formula of the Hercule Poirot series. The novel is not set in the manor house or a rural area like a number of its predecessors, nor do the characters represent the British gentry. The villains are a gang of international criminals, controlling a secret, global organization. Their goals include the so-called disintegration of human civilization. They control an unspecified "scientific force", a weapon of some kind. Speir speculates that they could hold the secrets to gravity or nuclear power.

Armin Risi agrees that this was to be the great case of Poirot's life, as the character himself claims that all other cases will seem tame by comparison (similar to Sherlock Holmes' statement about his own confrontation with Professor Moriarty). Poirot does not track down a murderer; he must face and expose a supranational association of high-ranking personalities who are working towards world domination. Risi sees the book as a work of secret history, which was inspired by the events and causes of World War I and the October Revolution (the novel was presumably written in 1924 or 1925; see the biographical remark below). The basic scenario of the novel features secret powers (the Four) influencing humanity and the course of history. To Risi it seems to be Agatha Christie's warning about real-life organizations doing the same. He points out that Christie herself may not have been an objective historian. She was a member of the high society in the British Empire. But this fact possibly gave her access to first-hand observers of world politics and the secret affairs behind them. During the interwar period, World War I and the October Revolution were still significant topics of conversation. He theorizes that Christie may have learned of organizations of conspirators active in the era, at least those active in the City of London. There were already rumors that secret forces were planning World War II or even World War III.

James Zemboy observes that this novel lacks the unity of plot of a proper novel. It is a series of episodes, only unified by the theme of Hercule Poirot investigating and uncovering the identity of one of the villains. The Big Four themselves are unique characters, each one representing a personification of evil. But Zemboy finds these characters lacking in traits to make them amusing, engaging, or personally interesting. The minor characters are not unique. They are generic messengers or information providers. John Ingles serves only to provide information on Li Chang Yen, Flossie Monro is only significant in providing a single clue, and Sonia Daviloff only serves to show Poirot the position of the chess table.

Zemboy finds the book atypically boring for Christie. He believes that readers whose only exposure to her work is this novel, will be unlikely to pursue more of her books. The episodic nature of the book could have led to it being twice as long or half as long, without making any difference. The pattern of the novel is a series of dangerous encounters and failures to catch the criminals. Poirot repeatedly sets traps for the enemy. Repeatedly the enemy knows in advance and does not fall for them. On the other side, the Big Four set traps for Poirot. He evades most of them, only to find that the Four anticipated his moves as well. He does fall for some "real" traps.

Jeremy Black, a historian, points out that a number of Agatha Christie's novels of the interwar period record the standard fears of affluent society in the era. She added the "paranoid" conviction of an underlying conspiracy. This is an element present in her literary work and absent in the adaptations of Agatha Christie for television and film.

Black adds that Christie's work is, in its way, typical of the literature of the interwar period, much of which reflected a concern about foreign threats and links between domestic and international challenges. The Big Four, the characters, are positioned as the hidden cause and connecting threat between the world-wide unrest, labour disputes, and the revolutions of the period—in particular, the October Revolution, with Vladimir Lenin and Leon Trotsky described as their puppets. The Big Four also have advanced technology in their arsenal.

=== Orientalism ===
Li Chang Yen is both a creature of sinister Orientalism and an echo of an earlier literary character: Fu Manchu by Sax Rohmer. The character was described as "the greatest genius which the powers of evil have put on the Earth for centuries", the foe of the British Empire and British civilization in general. The character combined great cruelty with advanced scientific research. In The Mystery of Dr. Fu-Manchu (1913), the eponymous character is presented as a figure behind Anti-Western actions in British Hong Kong and Chinese Turkestan. He is striking against Western politicians and administrators who are aware of the secret geopolitical importance of Tonkin, Mongolia, and Tibet, using these areas as a keyhole to the gate of the Indian Empire.

Fu Manchu's agents were omnipresent even in England. His organization was likened to a yellow octopus with Fu Manchu as its head with dacoits and thugs as its tentacles. These agents killed secretly, swiftly, leaving no clue behind. These were the literary predecessors of the Four and their agents.

David Suchet, who played Poirot for ITV from 1989 to 2013, had a different suggestion as to the origins of the Big Four. He found them to be an evil counterpart of The Four Just Men series by Edgar Wallace. He agrees, however, that Li Chang Yen was inspired by Fu Manchu.

== Literary significance and reception ==
This novel was published a year after The Murder of Roger Ackroyd (1926) and was overshadowed by its predecessor.

The Times Literary Supplement review of the book publication struck a positive although incorrect note in its issue of 3 February 1927 when it assumed that the different style of the book from its immediate predecessor, The Murder of Roger Ackroyd, was a deliberate ploy: "M. Poirot, the Belgian detective who has figured in others of Mrs Christie's tales, is in very good form in the latest series of adventures. The device which made 'Who killed Roger Ackroyd?' (sic) such a puzzling problem for the reader of detective fiction is one that a writer cannot easily employ a second time, and indeed the present story is not so much the clearing up of a mystery as a recital of Poirot's encounters with one of those familiar groups of international crooks of almost unlimited power who seek to dominate the world." Hastings was described as "dense as ever".

The New York Times Book Review of 2 October 1927 outlined the basics of the plot and stated "'Number Four' remains a mystery almost to the end. This, of course, makes it more difficult for the detective to guard against attack and to carry on his investigation, and it provides most of the thrills of the story."

The reviewer in The Observer of 13 February 1927 did not expect originality when reading a book dealing with the themes of The Big Four, but did admit that "When one opens a book and finds the name Li Chang Yen and is taken to subterranean chambers in the East End 'hung with rich Oriental silks', one fears the worst. Not that Mrs Christie gives us the worst; she is far too adroit and accomplished a hand for that. But the short, interpolated mysteries within the mystery are really much more interesting than the machinations of the 'Big Four' supermen." The conclusion of the book was "pretentious" and "fails to be impressive" and the reviewer summed up by saying, "the book has its thrills – in fact, too many of them; it seeks to make up in its details what it lacks in quality and consistency."

The Scotsman of 17 March 1927 said, "The activities of Poirot himself cannot be taken seriously, as one takes, for example, Sherlock Holmes. The book, indeed, reads more like an exaggerated parody of popular detective fiction than a serious essay in the type. But it certainly provides plenty of fun for the reader who is prepared to be amused. If that was the intention of the authoress, she has succeeded to perfection".

Robert Barnard: "This thriller was cobbled together at the lowest point in Christie's life, with the help of her brother-in-law. Charity is therefore the order of the day, and is needed, for this is pretty dreadful, and (whatever one may think of him as a creation) demeaning to Poirot."

== Publication history ==
- 1927, William Collins and Sons (London), 27 January 1927, Hardcover, 282 pp
- 1927, Dodd Mead and Company (New York), 1927, Hardcover, 276 pp
- 1957, Penguin Books, Paperback (Penguin number 1196), 159 pp
- 1961, Pan Books, Paperback (Great Pan G427), 155 pp
- 1964, Avon Books (New York), paperback
- 1965, Fontana Books (Imprint of HarperCollins), paperback, 159 pp
- 1965, Dell Books (New York), paperback, 173 pp
- 1974, Ulverscroft Large-print Edition, Hardback, 414 pp ISBN 0-85456-283-4
- 1984, Berkley Books, Imprint of Penguin Group (USA) (New York), paperback, 198 pp ISBN 978-0-425-09882-0
- 2006, Poirot Facsimile Edition (Facsimile of 1927 UK First Edition), HarperCollins, 6 November 2006, Hardcover, ISBN 0-00-723451-1

== Adaptations ==
=== Graphic novel ===
The Big Four was released by HarperCollins as a graphic novel adaptation on 3 December 2007, adapted and illustrated by Alain Paillou (ISBN 0-00-725065-7). This was translated from the edition first published in France by Emmanuel Proust éditions in 2006 under the title of Les Quatre.

=== Television ===
The novel was adapted for television with David Suchet as Poirot, as part of the final series of Agatha Christie's Poirot. The film premiered on ITV on 23 October 2013 and on PBS on 27 July 2014 in the United States; it also guest-starred Sarah Parish, Patricia Hodge, Tom Brooke, Nicholas Burns, and Simon Lowe. Suchet's former co-stars Hugh Fraser, Philip Jackson, and Pauline Moran reprised their roles as Hastings, Japp, and Miss Lemon. The episode is very loosely based on the novel, considered by writer Mark Gatiss to be "an almost unadaptable mess".

== Bibliography ==
- Pendergast, Bruce (2004), "Racism? Yes, Sorry to Say", Everyman's Guide to the Mysteries of Agatha Christie, Trafford Publishing, ISBN 978-1412023047
