= Parade's End (TV series) =

Television series

- Genre: Drama
- Based on: Parade's End by Ford Madox Ford
- Written by: Tom Stoppard
- Directed by: Susanna White
- Starring: Benedict Cumberbatch; Rebecca Hall; Adelaide Clemens
- Composer: Dirk Brossé
- Country of origin: United Kingdom
- Original language: English
- No. of series: 1
- No. of episodes: 5

Production
- Executive producers: Michel Buck; Damien Timmer
- Producers: David Parfitt; Selwyn Roberts
- Cinematography: Mike Eley
- Running time: 57–59 minutes (five-part version); 46 minutes (six-part version); 287 minutes (full running time)
- Production company: Mammoth Screen in association with HBO miniseries

Original release
- Network: BBC Two
- Release: 24 August – 21 September 2012

Parade's End is a five-part BBC television serial adapted from the novel cycle of the same name (1924–1928) by Ford Madox Ford. It premiered on BBC Two on 24 August 2012 and on HBO on 26 February 2013. The series was also screened at the 39th Ghent Film Festival on 11 October 2012. The miniseries was directed by Susanna White and written by Tom Stoppard. The cast was led by Benedict Cumberbatch and Rebecca Hall as Christopher and Sylvia Tietjens, along with Adelaide Clemens, Rupert Everett, Miranda Richardson, Anne-Marie Duff, Roger Allam, Janet McTeer, Freddie Fox, Jack Huston, and Steven Robertson.

The series received widespread critical acclaim and has sometimes been cited as "the highbrow Downton Abbey". In its BBC Two premiere, the series attracted 3.5 million viewers, making it BBC Two's most watched drama since Rome aired in 2005. The miniseries received six BAFTA TV nominations, including Best Actress for Rebecca Hall, and five Primetime Emmy Award nominations, including Best Adapted Screenplay for Tom Stoppard and Best Actor for Benedict Cumberbatch. It won Best Costume Design at the 2013 BAFTAs.

== Plot summary ==
In the years before the First World War, three Britons are drawn into fraught and ultimately tragic relations: Anglican Christopher Tietjens, second son of the lord of the manor of Groby, Yorkshire, who is a disconsolate statistician in London, with traditional Tory beliefs; Catholic Sylvia Satterthwaite, his promiscuous and self-centred socialite wife who has married him knowing that she was already pregnant (possibly by another man); and freethinking Valentine Wannop, a young suffragette, pacifist daughter of a lady novelist, who is torn between her idealism and her attraction to "Chrissy". As the war works a profound change on Europe, and Christopher is badly wounded in France, the conflict shatters and rearranges the lives of all three principals, as well as virtually everyone else in their elite circle.

== Production ==
The series was conceived when Damien Timmer approached playwright Tom Stoppard to write the adaptation. After reading the novels, Stoppard agreed to pen the screenplay, thus marking his return to television after a 30-year absence. Stoppard has stated that he had considered Benedict Cumberbatch for the role of Christopher Tietjens even before Sherlock made him a global star. Adelaide Clemens was cast as Valentine after arriving for her audition in period clothing. Initially, producers were reluctant to cast an Australian actress but were won over on finding that Clemens' father is a British national.

A significant part of the film was shot on location in Kent, at Dorton House and St. Thomas a Becket Church. Additional scenes were filmed at Freemasons' Hall in London and Duncombe Park. The rest of the series was filmed in Belgium, including Poeke Castle in the town of Aalter, utilising television drama tax breaks, with scenes at the Western Front recreated in Flanders.

Stoppard made changes from the source material, such as excluding most of the fourth novel, streamlining the plot to focus on the love triangle, and adding overt sex scenes. The exclusion of the fourth novel is not without precedent; it was also done in Graham Greene's 1963 edition of Parade's End, and Ford himself sometimes referred to it as a trilogy; "He may have written the fourth to fulfill a contract or because he needed more money", said Michael Schmidt, the executor of Ford's literary estate.

== Cast ==
- Benedict Cumberbatch as Christopher Tietjens
- Rebecca Hall as Sylvia Tietjens
- Adelaide Clemens as Valentine Wannop
- Miranda Richardson as Mrs Wannop, Valentine's widowed mother
- Freddie Fox as Edward Wannop, Valentine's younger brother
- Janet McTeer as Mrs Satterthwaite, Sylvia's mother
- Ned Dennehy as Father Consett
- Alan Howard as Tietjens Senior
- Rupert Everett as Mark Tietjens, Christopher's elder half-brother
- Misha Handley as Michael Tietjens (4 years old)
- Rudi Goodman as Michael Tietjens (8 years old)
- Stephen Graham as Vincent MacMaster
- Anne-Marie Duff as Edith Duchemin
- Rufus Sewell as Reverend Duchemin, Edith's husband
- Roger Allam as General Edward Campion
- Patrick Kennedy as Captain McKechnie
- Steven Robertson as Colonel Bill Williams
- Lucinda Raikes as Evie, Sylvia's maid
- Jack Huston as Gerald Drake, Sylvia's former lover
- Tom Mison as Peter "Potty" Perowne, involved in affair with Sylvia
- Jamie Parker as Lord Brownlie, frustrated admirer of Sylvia's
- Anna Skellern as Bobbie Pelham, Sylvia's best friend
- Sasha Waddell as Lady Glorvina, Bobbie Pelham's mother
- Henry Lloyd-Hughes as Captain Notting
- William Ellis as Aubrey

== Episodes ==
No.	Title	Directed by	Written by	Original release date	AUS viewers (millions)
1	"Episode One"	Susanna White	Tom Stoppard	24 August 2012	3.52
1908: Christopher Tietjens is a severe and principled government statistician from a wealthy land-owning family, while Sylvia Satterthwaite is a self-centred and promiscuous socialite. After one passionate encounter on a train, he marries the pregnant Sylvia in haste, although the real father of her child may be her married lover Gerald Drake, as Christopher's elder brother Mark points out. Three years on, Sylvia is an unloving mother, disdainful of her husband's views and intellectual bent, as well as being unfaithful. She goes to France with a new admirer, "Potty" Perowne, but when she announces her desire to return home, Christopher "resumes the yoke" (takes her back) for their son's sake. Sojourning in Germany as a cover for Sylvia's indiscretions, Sylvia's mother expresses her own misgivings. Whilst playing golf with a government minister who is opposed to women's suffrage, Christopher rescues young suffragette Valentine Wannop and her fellow suffragette, Gertie, from police pursuit after they attack the minister on the golf links. During the same weekend, along with his working class but talented writer friend and colleague Vincent MacMaster, Christopher is invited to a breakfast with Valentine's friend Edith Duchemin, the wife of a pedantic vicar whom Tietjens and McMaster knew at the University of Cambridge. The vicar's eccentric behaviour brings Edith and Vincent closer. The meal is also attended by Valentine's novelist mother. After helping Gertie evade the police the next night, Christopher and Valentine find themselves romantically drawn to each other in the dawn fog at the summer solstice.
2	"Episode Two"	Susanna White	Tom Stoppard	31 August 2012	2.30
1914: Sylvia and Christopher reunite in Germany, where she informs him of his mother's death. Back at the Tietjens family estate in Yorkshire, she shocks mourners at her mother-in-law's funeral with her black but fashionably elegant attire. Realising that she is reviled, she retreats to a convent but is soon back in society with another admirer. Suspicions arise that Valentine and Christopher are having an affair, as they had been seen at daybreak in a horse and carriage by General Campion and his sister. Christopher develops his friendship with the Wannops, giving the mother a valuable hint about the Balkan situation for her writing and pointedly mentioning the daughter in his Christmas card. Vincent's fortunes as a writer continue to rise and, after her husband's strangeness results in institutionalisation, Edith begins living with Vincent despite a mortifying incident at a hotel. She becomes pregnant and has an abortion after seeking advice from Valentine, who is not as worldly as Edith assumed from Valentine's support for women's suffrage. As World War I breaks out, the Wannops are harassed because of the pacifism of Valentine's brother. Christopher quits his job in disgust after being ordered to manipulate military statistics to bolster support for the war. He encounters Valentine at a party, and they both, reticently and painfully, all but declare their feelings for each other, before he leaves to fight in the trenches.
3	"Episode Three"	Susanna White	Tom Stoppard	7 September 2012	2.15
1915–16: Despite receiving a white feather for cowardice (he is still working as a statistician), Vincent becomes a very influential critic and author, and marries Edith after the Reverend Duchemin kills himself after being released from an asylum. They are the subject of gossip and scandal which also, erroneously, involves Christopher, who is wounded and shell-shocked in a French hospital. Sylvia entertains yet another admirer, her husband's banker Lord Brownlie, but defends Christopher against Brownlie's malicious gossip. Christopher—now an Army captain—returns home on leave, but Sylvia's friendships with German prisoners of war she knew before the war (perceived as pro-German sympathies) and past indiscretions, together with the effect of Brownlie's actions (he bounces Christopher's cheques) and malicious, erroneous gossipmongering make the couple exceedingly unpopular in society. Tietjens' father is so devastated by the gossip, revealed to him by Christopher's older brother Mark, that he shoots himself. Angered by this, Christopher refuses to accept his inheritance from his father. Despite the scandal, Christopher and Sylvia attend a soirée at the MacMasters', where Christopher again encounters Valentine, now working as a teacher. Aware that he is rumoured to have already taken Valentine as a mistress, Christopher moves toward making that a reality. They plan a tryst, but the consummation is thwarted when Edward, Valentine's brother, abruptly returns home on leave from the Navy. Before Christopher returns to France, Valentine tells him that she will wait for him.
4	"Episode Four"	Susanna White	Tom Stoppard	14 September 2012	1.70
1917: Christopher is in Rouen in a "safe" assignment at a training camp with his godfather, General Campion (although their location is routinely bombed), along with his unbalanced subordinate McKechnie. Christopher's job is to prepare fresh troops for the front; he directs that the men are to be humanely treated and horses properly cared for. This brings him into conflict with his unfeeling superiors, such as General O'Hara. Sylvia, who has been enduring the Zeppelin raids in London, defiantly arrives in Rouen and eventually meets Christopher at a hotel. She swears that she has been faithful to him for over five years and he grants her request to live, with their son Michael, at Groby, the Tietjens family estate in Yorkshire, which his elder brother Mark takes no interest in. They commence to make love in Sylvia's room but are interrupted by a lustful Potty Perowne whom Christopher forcefully pushes out. O'Hara arrives on the scene and accuses Sylvia of being a whore after seeing Perowne. Christopher then angrily accuses O'Hara of drunkenness and the general has him placed under arrest. To spare Christopher further scandal, Campion makes him second-in-command of a fighting battalion near the front. As he bids Christopher farewell, he reveals that he knows the rumours surrounding Sylvia's infidelity are true. A devastated Christopher explains his stance on her infidelity as "parade", but Campion reproves him by saying "Divorce the harlot! Or live with her like a man!".
5	"Episode Five"	Susanna White	Tom Stoppard	21 September 2012	1.77
February 1918: Christopher, McKechnie and Perowne have all been sent to fight at the front. Perowne is killed in an explosion. When Colonel Bill Williams, the commanding officer of Christopher's new battalion, suffers a nervous breakdown, Christopher replaces him. In England Valentine, whilst advocating that her fellow teachers and pupils should read Marie Stopes' Married Love, shocks her mother by asserting that she will become Christopher's mistress upon his return. In London, Sylvia meets with Gerald Drake again and becomes unfaithful to Christopher once more. After the Armistice Christopher finds a note from Sylvia at their deserted London flat, returns to Groby and discovers that the ancient "Groby Tree" – a centuries-old cedar, and the family's symbol of continuity and tradition – has been chopped down on Sylvia's orders. When he confronts her, she states that she is terminally ill, a claim he ignores. Back in London, Christopher is tracked down by Valentine and he greets her, although the effects of a further injury before the war ended mean that he has difficulty connecting with her. Although he says he will never divorce Sylvia, for their son's sake, he does warm to Valentine again and at a chance meeting with Sylvia makes clear that his future is now with Valentine. To mark the end of the war and an era, Christopher and Valentine celebrate with his old army comrades as a chunk of the "Groby Tree" burns in the fireplace in the flat the couple now share.

== Reception ==
The series has received widespread acclaim from British critics, The Independent's Grace Dent going so far as to proclaim it "one of the finest things the BBC has ever made". Others praised Cumberbatch and Hall in the lead roles, Cumberbatch for his ability to express suppressed pain, The Independent's Gerard Gilbert observed, "Perhaps no other actor of his generation is quite so capable of suggesting the tumult beneath a crusty, seemingly inert surface". The Arts Desk's Emma Dibdin found "Cumberbatch's performance... faultless and often achingly moving, a painful juxtaposition of emotional stiffness and deep, crippling vulnerability". Hall's Sylvia was lauded as "one of the great female characters of the past decade" by Caitlin Moran, who also wrote that "the script and direction have genius-level IQ" in her Times TV column.

"It’s an astonishing performance not least because it seems somehow to take on the authority of a lost generation of great acting. He uses his voice so rich and deep and subtle like the grand piano of one of the great actors of the Laurence Olivier generation. Yet his Tietjens is character acting carried to a point where authenticity transcends itself and turns into something heroic. This is a performance that ranks with Roger Livesey in Michael Powell's The Life and Death of Colonel Blimp — a parallel work, as it happens — or the very best work of Alec Guinness.”

— Arts critic Peter Craven on Benedict Cumberbatch as Christopher Tietjens

Parade's End attracted 3.5 million viewers for its first episode, making it the most watched BBC2 drama since Rome (2005). The second episode had a drop in ratings with 2.2 million viewers. A few viewers found the sound mixing awkward, the dialogue difficult to hear and understand.

The miniseries received generally favourable reviews from American and Canadian television critics for its HBO broadcast, according to Metacritic. Writing for Roger Ebert's Chicago Sun-Times column, Jeff Shannon wrote that the miniseries has "up-scale directing" and "award-worthy performances" while Brad Oswald of the Winnipeg Free Press called it "a television masterpiece". Ford's tetralogy became a best-seller after the dramatisation was broadcast on the BBC.

== Awards and nominations ==
Parade's End was nominated for numerous awards. Both Benedict Cumberbatch and Rebecca Hall won the Broadcasting Press Guild awards for Best Actor and Actress respectively, while Tom Stoppard picked up the Writer's Award and the series itself won Best Drama Series.

The miniseries received six BAFTA TV nominations, including Best Actress for Rebecca Hall and five Primetime Emmy Award nominations including Best Adapted Screenplay for Tom Stoppard and Best Actor for Benedict Cumberbatch. It won Best Costume Design at the BAFTAs.

Award	Category	Nominee(s)	Result
Primetime Emmy Awards	Outstanding Lead Actor in a Miniseries/Movie	Benedict Cumberbatch	Nominated
Primetime Emmy Awards	Outstanding Writing for a Miniseries/Movie	Tom Stoppard	Nominated
BAFTA Television Awards	Best Actress	Rebecca Hall	Nominated
BAFTA Television Awards	Best Mini-Series	Tom Stoppard, Susanna White, David Parfitt, and Damien Timmer	Nominated
BAFTA Television Awards	Best Costume Design	Sheena Napier	Won
BAFTA Television Awards	Best Make-up & Hair Design	Jan Archibald	Nominated
BAFTA Television Awards	Best Production Design	Martin Childs	Nominated
BAFTA Television Awards	Best Visual Effects and Graphic Design	Rupert Ray	Nominated
BAFTA Television Awards	Best Writer – Drama	Tom Stoppard	Nominated
Biarritz International Festival of Audiovisual Programming	Best TV Series or Serial		Nominated
Biarritz International Festival of Audiovisual Programming	Best Screenplay	Tom Stoppard	Won
British Society of Cinematographers	Best Cinematography in a Television Drama	Mike Eley	Nominated
Broadcasting Press Guild Awards	Best Actor	Benedict Cumberbatch	Won
Broadcasting Press Guild Awards	Best Actor	Roger Allam	Nominated
Broadcasting Press Guild Awards	Best Actress	Rebecca Hall	Won
Broadcasting Press Guild Awards	Best Drama Series/Serial		Won
Broadcasting Press Guild Awards	Writer's Award	Tom Stoppard	Won
Broadcast Awards	Best Drama Series or Serial		Nominated
Critics' Choice Television Awards	Best Actor in a TV Movie/Mini-Series	Benedict Cumberbatch	Nominated
Critics' Choice Television Awards	Best Actress in a TV Movie/Mini-Series	Rebecca Hall	Nominated
Royal Television Society Awards	Best Drama Serial		Nominated
Royal Television Society Craft & Design Awards	Best Production Design – Drama	Martin Childs	Nominated
Royal Television Society Craft & Design Awards	Best Graphic Design – Titles	Rupert Ray	Won
South Bank Sky Arts Awards	Best TV Drama		Won
International Press Academy	Actor in a Miniseries or a Motion Picture Made for Television	Benedict Cumberbatch	Nominated

== Merchandise ==
BBC Books produced a tie-in edition of Parade's End with Cumberbatch, Hall, and Clemens on the cover. It was made available in the UK on 16 August 2012.

Faber & Faber published a Parade End companion book by Tom Stoppard, which includes the script, production stills, and deleted scenes omitted from the broadcast.

The soundtrack by Dirk Brossé was released in digital and physical copies on 2 October 2012.

The BBC released DVD and Blu-ray copies of the series on 8 October 2012. They include behind the scenes footage and selected interviews with crew and cast members.
