= Inspector Japp =

James Japp
- Philip Jackson as Japp in Agatha Christie's Poirot
- First appearance: The Mysterious Affair at Styles
- Created by: Agatha Christie
- Portrayed by: Melville Cooper; John Turnbull; Maurice Denham; David Suchet; Philip Jackson; Kevin McNally

In-universe information
- Occupation: Chief inspector of Scotland Yard
- Nationality: British

Inspector James Japp (later Chief Inspector Japp) is a fictional character who appears in several of Agatha Christie's novels featuring Hercule Poirot.

== Creation ==
Inspector Japp was inspired by the fictional police detective Inspector Lestrade from the Sherlock Holmes stories by Arthur Conan Doyle. Christie even modelled Japp after the "ferret-like" qualities of Lestrade. In the first novel in which Japp appears, The Mysterious Affair at Styles, he is described as a "ferret-faced man", which is similar to the description of Lestrade as a "ferret-like man" in Doyle's 1891 short story "The Boscombe Valley Mystery".

== Appearances ==
Japp has been depicted in seven novels written by Christie, all featuring Hercule Poirot:

- The Mysterious Affair at Styles (1920)
- The Big Four (1927)
- Peril at End House (1932)
- Lord Edgware Dies (1933), also known as Thirteen at Dinner
- Death in the Clouds (1935), also known as Death in the Air
- The A.B.C. Murders (1936), also known as The Alphabet Murders
- One, Two, Buckle My Shoe (1940), also known as An Overdose of Death and The Patriotic Murders. This is his last appearance in any work by Christie, although he is briefly mentioned in two later works.

In most of these appearances, Japp is a minor character with minimal interactions with Poirot or involvement in the plot. He also appears in the short story "The Flock of Geryon" (see The Labours of Hercules).

Japp emerges however as a major character and partner to Poirot in Lord Edgware Dies. He returns in this capacity in Death in the Clouds and One, Two, Buckle My Shoe, before being written out of the series. In number of appearances, Japp is comparable to Arthur Hastings who was featured in eight of the Poirot novels.

Inspector Japp is also briefly mentioned in the Tommy and Tuppence book The Secret Adversary (1922); his card is brought to Julius Hersheimmer at the end of chapter five. In chapter seventeen of The Murder of Roger Ackroyd (1926), Japp is mentioned by a police superintendent to Poirot as having asked after him. Japp is mentioned by Poirot in Death on the Nile (1937), and by Colonel Weston in Evil Under the Sun (1941), the next book in the Poirot series after his final appearance. Japp is also mentioned in the novel Taken at the Flood (1948) by Superintendent Spence during a conversation with Hercule Poirot.

Japp's career in the Poirot novels extends into the 1930s but, like Hastings, he disappeared from Christie's writing thereafter. A police officer somewhat similar in character (Superintendent Spence) was introduced as a significant recurring character in the later Poirot novels.

Japp appears in Christie's stage play Black Coffee, written in 1929. He remarks to Poirot that it has been a "long time" since they last met, in connection with "that Welsh case", which is not otherwise identified. Japp also appears in Charles Osborne's novelisation of Black Coffee.

Like those of Miss Lemon and Arthur Hastings, the role of Inspector Japp in Poirot's career has been exaggerated by adaptations of Christie's original novels, specifically by the TV series Agatha Christie's Poirot, where these characters are often introduced into stories that did not originally feature them.

== Characteristics ==
Inspector Japp has a tendency to jump to conclusions, and to accept simple solutions to cases. However, he becomes a more competent and respected police detective over time, eventually earning a promotion to Chief Inspector and demonstrating his capability in this position. He respects Poirot's abilities; having first worked with him in 1904 on the otherwise unrecorded "Abercrombie forgery case" (at which time Poirot was in the employ of the Belgian police), in The Mysterious Affair at Styles Japp is willing to delay arresting a suspect merely on Poirot's recommendation. However the blunt Japp is sometimes rude to Poirot, usually due more to his naturally gruff and abrupt demeanour than to any deliberate antagonism. Over the years, Japp becomes more of a friend to Poirot and works more closely with him. Japp sometimes accuses Poirot of "making things difficult" when Poirot contradicts a solution which Japp believes is correct; however, when Japp is proved wrong, he acknowledges his mistake and makes remarks such as "you're the goods!" to Poirot. In One, Two, Buckle My Shoe, the last novel in which he appears, Japp visits Poirot at his flat to apologise after doubting him and to tell Poirot he was right.

When off duty, Japp is an "ardent botanist", according to Hastings in the 1923 short story "The Market Basing Mystery". Japp is described as "little, sharp, dark and ferret-faced" in the 1920 novel The Mysterious Affair at Styles, and as a "little ferret-faced fellow" in the 1923 short story "The Kidnapped Prime Minister".

== Portrayals ==
The role of Japp is played by Philip Jackson in the British TV series Agatha Christie's Poirot, where Hercule Poirot's character is played by David Suchet. Before Suchet took on the role of Poirot, he had previously played Japp himself in the 1985 film Thirteen at Dinner, where Peter Ustinov played Poirot. Philip Jackson portrays Japp as working-class and 'thoroughly British', not very intelligent but an extremely diligent, canny and active police officer with a good but rather dry sense of humour, characteristics which often serve as a perfect foil to Poirot's personality, who is intelligent, elegant, upper-class but rather slow in movements and of a very serious nature.

In the same television series, Japp is already a Chief Inspector in the first episode, his full name is James Harold Japp according to the episode "The Chocolate Box", and he has been promoted to Assistant Commissioner by the time he appears in the episode "The Big Four".

Philip Jackson is also one of the actors who played Japp in the BBC Radio adaptations of Poirot stories, produced contemporaneously with the Suchet TV series and starring John Moffatt as Poirot. In the radio dramatisations, Inspector Japp was played by Norman Jones in Lord Edgware Dies (1992), by Philip Jackson in The ABC Murders (2000), Death In The Clouds (2003), One, Two, Buckle My Shoe (2004), and The Mysterious Affair at Styles (2005), and by Bryan Pringle in Peril at End House (2000).

Japp is played by Melville Cooper in the 1931 film adaptation of Christie's stage play Black Coffee.

As the inspector's name is spelled similarly and pronounced in the same way as the ethnic slur Jap, he was renamed Inspector Sharp (シャープ警部, Shaapu-keibu) in the Japanese anime series Agatha Christie's Great Detectives Poirot and Marple (NHK, 2004).

In the Professor Layton series of puzzle video games for the Nintendo DS and Nintendo 3DS, the fictional Scotland Yard chief inspector Chelmey appears visually and contextually as a comically incompetent caricature of Inspector Japp as played by Philip Jackson.

A retired Japp is played by Kevin McNally in The ABC Murders (2018); the series starts with Japp dying of a heart attack, and a recurring sub-plot is Inspector Crome, Japp's protégé, expressing distrust of Poirot as he feels that working with Poirot ruined Japp's career.
