= Mammoth Screen =

English production company

Mammoth Screen Limited
- Type: Private limited company
- Industry: Television; Media
- Genre: Production company
- Founded: 2007; 19 years ago
- Founders: Michele Buck; Damien Timmer
- Headquarters: UK
- Parent: ITV Studios (2015–present)
- Website: www.mammothscreen.com

Mammoth Screen Limited is a UK-based production company that was established in 2007 by Michele Buck and Damien Timmer. It produces drama for key UK broadcasters, especially ITV, and international distribution.

ITV announced on 1 June 2015 that it had acquired Mammoth Screen, which is now part of ITV Studios.

== Productions ==
Year	Title	Aired on
2008	Bonekickers	BBC One
2008	Lost in Austen	ITV
2009	Wuthering Heights	ITV / PBS Masterpiece
2010	Margot	BBC Four
2010	Amanda Holden's Fantasy Lives	ITV
2010	Bouquet of Barbed Wire	ITV
2010	Joe Maddison's War	ITV
2010	Dappers	BBC Three
2011	Christopher and His Kind	BBC Two
2011–2012	Monroe	ITV
2012–2023	Endeavour	ITV / PBS Masterpiece
2012	Parade's End	BBC Two / HBO / VRT
2012	Falcón	Sky Atlantic / Canal+ / ZDF
2013–2014	Blandings	BBC One
2014–2016	Agatha Raisin	Sky One
2014	Remember Me	BBC One
2015–2019	Poldark	BBC One / PBS Masterpiece
2015	Black Work	ITV
2015	And Then There Were None	BBC One / A&E Television Networks
2015	Tripped	E4
2015	Best Possible Taste: The Kenny Everett Story	BBC Four
2016–2019	Victoria	ITV / PBS Masterpiece
2016	The Witness for the Prosecution	BBC One / Acorn TV
2016	NW	BBC Two
2017	Fearless	ITV
2018	Next of Kin	ITV
2018	Ordeal by Innocence	BBC One / Prime Video
2018	The City and the City	BBC Two
2018	Vanity Fair	ITV / Prime Video
2018	The ABC Murders	BBC One / Prime Video
2019–2023	World on Fire	BBC One / PBS Masterpiece
2019	The War of the Worlds	BBC One
2020	The Pale Horse	BBC One / Prime Video
2020–2024	McDonald & Dodds	ITV / BritBox
2020–2022	Noughts + Crosses	BBC One
2020	The Singapore Grip	ITV
2021	The Serpent	BBC One / Netflix
2021–2024	The Tower	ITV
2022	Why Didn't They Ask Evans?	BritBox
2023	Tom Jones	ITV / PBS Masterpiece
2023	Grime Kids	BBC Three
2023	Murder is Easy	BBC One / BritBox
2025	Towards Zero	BBC One / BritBox
2025	Code Of Silence	ITV1
2025	The Forsytes	5 / PBS Masterpiece
2026	The Rapture	BBC One
2026	Betrayal	ITV1
2026	The Witch Farm	BBC One
TBA	Brideshead Revisited	BBC One / HBO
TBA	Death Comes as the End	BBC One
TBA	Hercule	BBC One
TBA	Crotch End	Prime Video

== North Korean hacking allegations ==
In October 2017 it was reported that an upcoming drama about a British nuclear scientist taken prisoner in North Korea, commissioned by Channel 4 and with the working title Opposite Number, had caused the production company's computer network to be targeted by North Korean hackers. The project was subsequently shelved.
