= Vanity Fair (2018 TV series) =

2018 British television series

- Genre: Historical period drama
- Created by: Gwyneth Hughes
- Based on: Vanity Fair by William Makepeace Thackeray
- Written by: Gwyneth Hughes
- Directed by: James Strong
- Starring: Olivia Cooke; Claudia Jessie; Tom Bateman; Johnny Flynn; Charlie Rowe; Simon Russell Beale; Anthony Head; Martin Clunes; Felicity Montagu; Frances de la Tour; Michael Palin
- Theme music composer: Bob Dylan
- Opening theme: "All Along the Watchtower" by Afterhere
- Composer: Isobel Waller-Bridge
- Country of origin: United Kingdom
- Original language: English
- No. of episodes: 7

Production
- Executive producers: Damien Timmer; Tom Mullens; Gwyneth Hughes; James Strong
- Producer: Julia Stannard
- Cinematography: Ed Rutherford
- Editors: Jamie Pearson; Steven Worsley; Danielle Palmer
- Camera setup: Single-camera
- Running time: 45–47 minutes
- Production companies: Mammoth Screen; ITV Studios; Amazon Prime Video

Original release
- Network: ITV
- Release: 2 September – 7 October 2018

Vanity Fair is a 2018 historical drama miniseries based on the 1848 novel of the same name by William Makepeace Thackeray. It was produced by Mammoth Screen and distributed by ITV and Amazon Studios.

The series stars Olivia Cooke as Becky Sharp, Tom Bateman as Captain Rawdon Crawley, Claudia Jessie as Amelia Sedley, and Michael Palin as the author William Makepeace Thackeray.

== Cast ==
=== Main ===
- Olivia Cooke as Becky Sharp, the daughter of a French opera singer and an artist father. Sharp is a cynical social climber who uses her charms to fascinate and seduce upper-class men.
- Claudia Jessie as Amelia Sedley, a good-natured naive young girl, of a wealthy London family who is Becky's friend from Miss Pinkerton's academy and invites Becky to stay in her London home following their graduation from the academy.
- Tom Bateman as Rawdon Crawley, an empty-headed cavalry officer, younger of the two Crawley sons and favourite of their Aunt Matilda, until he marries Becky Sharp, a woman of a far lower class.
- Johnny Flynn as William Dobbin, colonel of the City Light Horse regiment and the best friend of George Osborne, who feels unrequited love for Amelia.
- Charlie Rowe as George Osborne, son of merchant John Osborne and childhood sweetheart, later husband, of Amelia, who defies his father to marry his love.
- Simon Russell Beale as Mr. John Sedley, Amelia and Jos's father and Louisa's husband who goes bankrupt.
- Anthony Head as Lord Steyne, a rich and powerful marquis who is attracted to Becky.
- Martin Clunes as Sir Pitt Crawley, a crude and profligate baronet who hired Becky as governess to his daughters before seeking to marry her, and then discovering she has become secretly engaged to his second son, Rawdon.
- Frances de la Tour as Lady Matilda Crawley, the wealthy aunt of the Crawley sons.
- Mathew Baynton as Bute Crawley, Rawdon's Christian brother.
- Sian Clifford as Martha Crawley, Bute's spouse.
- Robert Pugh as Mr. John Osborne, George's father who forbids him from marrying Amelia.
- Suranne Jones as Miss Pinkerton, snobbish and cold-hearted headmistress of the academy which Amelia and Becky used to attend.
- David Fynn as Jos Sedley, Collector in India and Amelia's brother who has an initial attraction to Becky.
- Felicity Montagu as Arabella Briggs, servant to Lady Matilda, and later Becky.
- Claire Skinner as Mrs. Louisa Sedley, Amelia and Joss's mother and John's wife.
- Michael Palin as William Makepeace Thackeray, the author of Vanity Fair and narrator of the series.

=== Recurring ===
- Mike Grady as Horrocks
- Lauren Crace as Betsy Horrocks
- Ellie Kendrick as Jane Osborne
- Elizabeth Berrington as Lady Bareacres
- Sally Phillips as Lady Steyne
- Richard Dixon as General Tuffo
- Peter Wight as Mr Raggles
- Patrick FitzSymons as Major Michael O'Dowd
- Monica Dolan as Mrs. Peggy O'Dowd
- Niamh Durkin as Rose Crawley
- Rafferty Railton as Rawdy Crawley
- Richie Campbell as Sam

== Episodes ==
No.	Title	Directed by	Written by	Original release date	UK viewers (millions)
1	"Miss Sharp in the Presence of the Enemy"	James Strong	Gwyneth Hughes	2 September 2018	5.45
After losing her teaching job with Ms. Pinkerton due to an unladylike attitude, orphan Becky Sharp is given the position of governess in Hampshire that she does not want. Kind-hearted and wealthy Amelia finds Becky crying in her room. Becky convinces Amelia to let her stay with her. As a parting shot at Ms. Pinkerton, she shouts "Vive la France", "Vive Napoleon". Amelia's parents take Becky into their house. Becky makes herself out as a victim but the butler knows better. Amelia mentions her brother Jos in India. Seems like everyone except Amelia suspects Becky of trying to impose upon Amelia's family. Jos arrives and seems taken with Becky. After giving Becky flowers Jos regales Becky with his adventures in India. Amelia's fiancee George tries to talk Jos out of connecting himself to Becky. Becky, Jos, Amelia, and George go to Vauxhall Pleasure Garden and go on a balloon ride and watch fireworks. Jos makes a drunken fool out of himself and almost proposes to Becky. A letter arrives for Amelia the next day in which Jos asks for Becky's forgiveness for what he said to her and that he's leaving for Cheltenham. George tells Becky "better luck in your next life". Becky packs and Amelia offers Becky a necklace but Becky declines as she does not want to be accused of thievery. As Becky leaves, George tells Amelia that Becky must learn her station. Becky arrives at Queen's Crawley. She will be teaching Rose and Violet Cawley.
2	"Miss Sharp Begins to Make Friends"	James Strong	Gwyneth Hughes	3 September 2018	4.90
Becky is in Hampshire as governess to Sir Pitt Crawley's neglected daughters. Determined to get into his good books she quickly lands a promotion to secretary. The arrival of Crawley's sister prompts a new plan.
3	"A Quarrel About An Heiress"	James Strong	Gwyneth Hughes	9 September 2018	4.22
Becky has moved in with Matilda Crawley and seems to have a bright future ahead of her. However, war is brewing which threatens the fortunes of the scheming social climber and everyone she knows.
4	"In Which Becky Joins Her Regiment"	James Strong	Gwyneth Hughes	16 September 2018	4.04
George refuses to apologise for his marriage to Amelia and his father cuts him off from the family and his inheritance. All the friends leave for Brussels, where Becky makes use of every opportunity to advance in society.
5	"In Which Battles Are Won and Lost"	James Strong	Gwyneth Hughes	23 September 2018	N/A
The Battle of Waterloo gets underway with George in the thick of it. Becky spies an opportunity to profit from the war by selling Rawdon's horses to the cowardly Jos.
6	"In Which a Painter's Daughter Meets a King"	Jonathan Entwistle	Gwyneth Hughes	30 September 2018	2.30
Becky's time to finally shine arrives as she is introduced to the King, it comes at great cost though. How will her marriage hold up to the new arrangement she has made?
7	"Endings and Beginnings"	James Strong	Gwyneth Hughes	7 October 2018	N/A
Becky is alone and living in greatly reduced circumstances. Dobbin discovers that Amelia plans to remarry, prompting him to finally confess his feelings for her. The Sedleys have an unexpected encounter on holiday.

== Production ==
A cottage on Chevening House Estate, Sevenoaks in Kent featured as Rawdon Crawley's cottage. Squerryes Court, Sevenoaks, was used for the interiors of Miss Pinkerton's school. A scene on the promenade, featuring soldiers and horses, was shot outside the Royal Hotel in Deal, Kent. Further filming took place at Chatham Historic Dockyard, where various London street scenes were shot outside the Ropery, an embarkation to France was shot on Anchor Wharf, and the interior of the Commissioner's House was also used.

== Soundtrack ==
The soundtrack featured a cover of "All Along the Watchtower", by Afterhere.

== Critical reception ==
The series was met with a positive response from critics for its sets and Olivia Cooke's performance. On the review aggregation website Rotten Tomatoes, the series holds a 88% with an average rating of 7.08 out of 10 based on 33 reviews. The website's critical consensus reads, "Olivia Cooke's brilliant portrayal of the feisty and scheming Becky Sharp in Vanity Fair makes this adaptation of Thackeray's classic novel more relatable for a 21st century audience." On Metacritic, the show has a weighted average score of 66 out of 100, based on 7 critics, indicating "generally favorable reviews".

Following the conclusion of the series and on writing about the series's significantly low viewing figures in comparison to the BBC One "ratings juggernaut" Bodyguard, Ben Dowell of the Radio Times praised Cooke's performance, writing that "of all the TV Beckys down the ages – Joyce Redman, Susan Hampshire, Eve Matheson, Natasha Little, not to mention Reese Witherspoon in the 2004 film – Cooke is definitely one of the best we’ve ever had." Newsday's Verne Gay was more critical of the show, calling it both "faithful and faithless" to the book and concluded that the series "can occasionally feel like a homework assignment."

Matthew Gilbert, writing for The Boston Globe, was more positive, stating that "If you’re a fan of these adaptations...I think you'll find something pleasing in this Vanity Fair — not heroes and heroines stirring about waiting for their happy endings, of course, but something far more scandalous and universal."
