= Damien Timmer =

British businessman

- Born: Damien Gerard Timmer; 20 October 1968 (age 58); Chelsea, London, England
- Occupations: Joint-Managing director, television producer, television executive
- Years active: 1994–present

Damien Gerard Timmer (born 20 October 1968) is Chief Creative Officer and Founder of British independent production company Mammoth Screen, which was established in 2007. He was born in Chelsea, London, and has executive produced shows for the BBC, ITV, Channel 4, Channel Five, Sky, HBO, Netflix, Amazon, Britbox and PBS including Lost in Austen, Wuthering Heights, Monroe, Endeavour, Victoria, McDonald & Dodds, Fearless, Vanity Fair, The Tower, Code of Silence, Margot, Blandings, Remember Me, Poldark, Christopher and His Kind, Parade's End, War of the Worlds, The Serpent, World on Fire, Noughts + Crosses, Grime Kids, And Then There Were None, The Witness for the Prosecution, Ordeal by Innocence, The Pale Horse, The Tower, Hercule, Why Didn't They Ask Evans, Murder Is Easy and Towards Zero.

Previously, Damien Timmer was head of Granada London Drama, where he was responsible for executive producing Marple, Poirot and Lewis for ITV, The Prisoner for AMC / ITV Productions. Housewife 49, Dracula, Ballet Shoes and Russell T Davies’ Casanova, starring David Tennant, made by Red Productions.
