= Remember Me (TV series) =

- Genre: Supernatural horror
- Written by: Gwyneth Hughes
- Directed by: Ashley Pearce
- Starring: Michael Palin; Mark Addy; Jodie Comer
- Country of origin: United Kingdom
- Original language: English
- No. of series: 1
- No. of episodes: 3

Production
- Executive producers: Rebecca Keane; Damien Timmer; Gwyneth Hughes; Polly Hill
- Producer: Chris Carey
- Production locations: Scarborough, North Yorkshire, England
- Editor: Adam Bosman
- Running time: 60 minutes
- Production company: Mammoth Screen

Original release
- Network: BBC One; BBC One HD
- Release: 23 November – 7 December 2014

Remember Me is a British three-part drama television serial that premiered on BBC One in autumn 2014. Written by Gwyneth Hughes, the three-part mystery was made by Mammoth Screen. Michael Palin plays the lead role, making it his first regular television acting role in 20 years.

== Plot ==
The elderly Tom Parfitt fakes a fall at his long-term terraced house in Yorkshire, to escape to a care home. However, soon after arriving, the social worker who delivered Tom is thrown from the seemingly impenetrable fourth floor window of Tom's room, with only her and the frail Tom inside. This mystifies teenaged care assistant Hannah, although local police, including depressed detective Rob Fairholme are largely uninterested. One by one, strange things begin happening to those in contact with Tom, including Hannah and her family, and Tom soon vanishes from his hospital bed without explanation. Returning to Tom's home, Hannah starts to piece together several clues that lead her to Scarborough, where a dark secret from Tom's past comes to light and it becomes apparent that the paranormal is moving against them.

== Cast ==
| Character | Episode 1 | Episode 2 | Episode 3 |
|---|---|---|---|
| Hannah Ward | Jodie Comer | Jodie Comer | Jodie Comer |
| Isha | Mayuri Boonham | Mayuri Boonham | Mayuri Boonham |
| Jeff Harding | | Richard Lumsden | |
| Andy Phelps | Marcus Garvey | | |
| Lucy Fairholme | Kate Dobson | Kate Dobson | Kate Dobson |
| Shirley Padfield | Noreen Kershaw | Noreen Kershaw | |
| Tom Parfitt | Michael Palin | Michael Palin | Michael Palin |
| Nancy | Eileen Davies | Eileen Davies | Eileen Davies |
| Jan Ward | Julia Sawalha | Julia Sawalha | Julia Sawalha |
| Sean Ward | Jamie Rooney-West | Jamie Rooney-West | Jamie Rooney-West |
| Zamir Salim | Aqib Khan | Aqib Khan | |
| Rob Fairholme | Mark Addy | Mark Addy | Mark Addy |
| Loveday Hutton | | | Sheila Hancock |
| Allison Denning | Rebekah Staton | Rebekah Staton | |
| Roshana Salim | Mina Anwar | Mina Anwar | |
| Debbie Farthing | Kirsty Hoiles | Kirsty Hoiles | |
| Akil Salim | Ubayd Rehman | Ubayd Rehman | |
| DCI Grogan | Tony Pitts | Tony Pitts | Tony Pitts |
| Mavis | Rita May | | |

== Production ==
In February 2013, the series was commissioned by Ben Stephenson and Danny Cohen for BBC One. Filming began in January 2014 in Huddersfield and Scarborough. The series is produced by Chris Carey and directed by Ashley Pearce. Funding was provided by ITV GE and North Light Film Studios. The British Film Institute issued a tax break on the series. It started airing on Sunday 23 November 2014 at 9pm. The series consisted of one run of three episodes.

== Foreign broadcasts ==
The series was shown in the US on PBS in summer 2017.
