= Edward Bluemel =

English actor (born 1993)

- Born: Edward Robert Bluemel; 22 May 1993 (age 33); Tunbridge Wells, England
- Education: Royal Welsh College of Music & Drama
- Occupation: Actor
- Years active: 2014–present

Edward Robert Bluemel (born 22 May 1993) is an English actor. On television, he is known for his roles in the Sky One series A Discovery of Witches (2018–2022), the BBC series Killing Eve (2019–2022) and We Might Regret This (2024–), the Amazon Prime series My Lady Jane (2024) and the Netflix series Agatha Christie's Seven Dials (2026). He also had a voice role in the Netflix animated series Castlevania: Nocturne (2023–2025). He is set to star in Hercule (2027).

== Early life and education ==
Bluemel was born in Tunbridge Wells, Kent. He attended Taunton School, the exclusive public school in Somerset, where his parents Martin and Jane taught chemistry and physics respectively. He has two siblings, a sister named Phyllida and an elder brother named Ben. Bluemel was 11 when he first got into acting through a school play and 17 when he decided to pursue it professionally. He took a year-long foundation course at RADA before going on to graduate from the Royal Welsh College of Music & Drama in 2015 with a Bachelor of Arts in Acting. During his time at drama school, Bluemel was flatmates with Jacob Ifan.

== Career ==
In 2017, Bluemel made his West End debut in Love In Idleness at the Menier Chocolate Factory and Apollo Theatre, as well as his feature film debut in Access All Areas, and had his first main television role as Toby Hamilton in the ITV war drama The Halcyon. He also appeared in Touch at the Soho Theatre.

The following year, Bluemel began starring as amiable vampire Marcus Whitmore in the Sky One fantasy series A Discovery of Witches, an adaptation of the book of the same name by Deborah Harkness. He also appeared in the film The Commuter in a minor part. In 2019, he had a recurring role as Maeve Wiley's (Emma Mackey) brother Sean in the Netflix comedy-drama Sex Education and joined the main cast of the BBC thriller Killing Eve for its second series as Hugo, an immature MI6 agent.

Bluemel played Captain Harville in the 2022 Netflix film Persuasion and Luke Nightingale in the Amazon Prime series Ten Percent. He provided the voice of protagonist Richter Belmont in the Netflix animated series Castlevania: Nocturne from 2023 to 2025, followed by co-starring roles in the MGM+ series Belgravia: The Next Chapter and the Amazon Prime adaptation of My Lady Jane, both in 2024.

In 2025, Bluemel appeared as William Shakespeare opposite Ncuti Gatwa as Kit Marlowe in a West End production of Born with Teeth. In 2026, Bluemel appeared as Jimmy Thesiger in Agatha Christie's Seven Dials, a three-episode Netflix miniseries based on the novel by mystery novelist Agatha Christie. That same year, Bluemel was cast as Christie's fictional Belgian detective Hercule Poirot in the BBC series Hercule.

== Personal life ==
In his spare time, Bluemel enjoys lo-fi music and football as hobbies. He also has an interest in fish. As of 2019, he lived in Tooting Bec, South London.

== Filmography ==
Key
†	Denotes works that have not yet been released

=== Short film ===
Year	Title	Role	Notes
2013	I'm Not Gavin		Co-writer
2018	House Finch	Jamie	
2020	Behind the Filter	Barney	
2020	Pelicans	Ben Bay	
2022	Safe Word		Writer and executive producer
2023	Such A Lovely Day	Dad	
2024	Greta Gerwig		
2024	Post Mortem	James	

=== Film ===
Year	Title	Role	Notes
2017	Access All Areas	Heath	Lead
2018	The Commuter	Gwen's Boyfriend	
2019	How to Build a Girl	Strange Cages Manager	
2022	Persuasion	Captain Harville	Netflix film

=== Television ===
Year	Title	Role	Notes
2016	Holby City	Dexter Arnold	Episode: "A Friend in Need"
2017	The Halcyon	Toby Hamilton	Main role; 8 episodes
2017	The Crown	Young Man (Barracks)	Unknown episodes
2018–2022	A Discovery of Witches	Marcus Whitmore	Main role; 17 episodes
2019	Traitors	Barrie Clifton	2 episodes
2019–2022	Killing Eve	Hugo	Main role; 9 episodes
2019–2023	Sex Education	Sean Wiley	Recurring; 6 episodes
2020	Trying	Jonny	Episode: "Show Me the Love"
2020	Brave New World	Arch Songster	Episode: "Monogamy and Futility: Part 1"
2021	Please Help	Dean Nutt	Television pilot
2022	Ten Percent	Luke	6 episodes
2023–2025	Castlevania: Nocturne	Richter Belmont (voice)	Lead role; 16 episodes
2024	Belgravia: The Next Chapter	Dr. Stephen Ellerby	Main role; 7 episodes
2024	My Lady Jane	Lord Guildford Dudley	Main role; 8 episodes
2024–present	We Might Regret This	Levi	Main role; 10 episodes
2025	Washington Black	Billy McGee	8 episodes
2026	Agatha Christie's Seven Dials	Jimmy Thesiger	Main cast; 3 episodes
2027 †	Hercule	Hercule Poirot	Lead role, filming

=== Theatre ===
Year	Title	Role	Venue
2014	The Winter's Tale	Leontes	Richard Burton Theatre Company
2014	Strange Orchestra	George	Richard Burton Theatre Company
2014	Mercury Fur	Lola	Company of Sirens
2014	King Lear	Earl of Gloucester	RWCMD
2015	Longing	Sergei	Richard Burton Theatre Company
2015	Animal	Hector / Herdsman	Richard Burton Theatre Company
2017	Love In Idleness	Michael Brown	Menier Chocolate Factory and Apollo Theatre
2017	Touch	Paddy	Soho Theatre
2025	Born With Teeth	William Shakespeare	Wyndham's Theatre

=== Video games ===
Year	Title	Role	Notes
2022	The Dark Pictures Anthology: The Devil in Me	Jeff	Voice and motion capture

=== Audio dramas ===
Year	Title	Role	Notes
2020	Intelligent Design	Daniel Lewis	Audible original
2026	Wraith	Iain	BBC Radio 4 serial
