= The Murder of Roger Ackroyd =

1926 mystery novel by Agatha Christie

- First edition
- Author: Agatha Christie
- Cover artist: Ellen Edwards
- Language: English
- Series: Hercule Poirot
- Genre: Detective fiction Murder mystery
- Set in: England, 1920s
- Publisher: William Collins, Sons
- Publication date: 1926
- Publication place: United Kingdom
- Pages: 312
- Dewey Decimal: 823.912
- LC Class: PR6005.H66 M85
- Preceded by: Poirot Investigates (short stories)
- Followed by: The Big Four
- Text: The Murder of Roger Ackroyd at Wikisource
- Website: agathachristie.com

The Murder of Roger Ackroyd is a mystery novel by the British writer Agatha Christie, her third to feature Hercule Poirot as the lead detective. The novel was published in the UK in June 1926 by William Collins, Sons, having previously been serialised as Who Killed Ackroyd? between July and September 1925 in the London Evening News. An American edition by Dodd, Mead and Company followed in 1926.

The novel was well received from its first publication, and has been called Christie's masterpiece. In 2013, the British Crime Writers' Association voted it the best crime novel ever. It is one of Christie's best-known and most controversial novels, its innovative twist ending having a significant impact on the genre. Howard Haycraft included it in his list of the most influential crime novels ever written.

== Plot ==
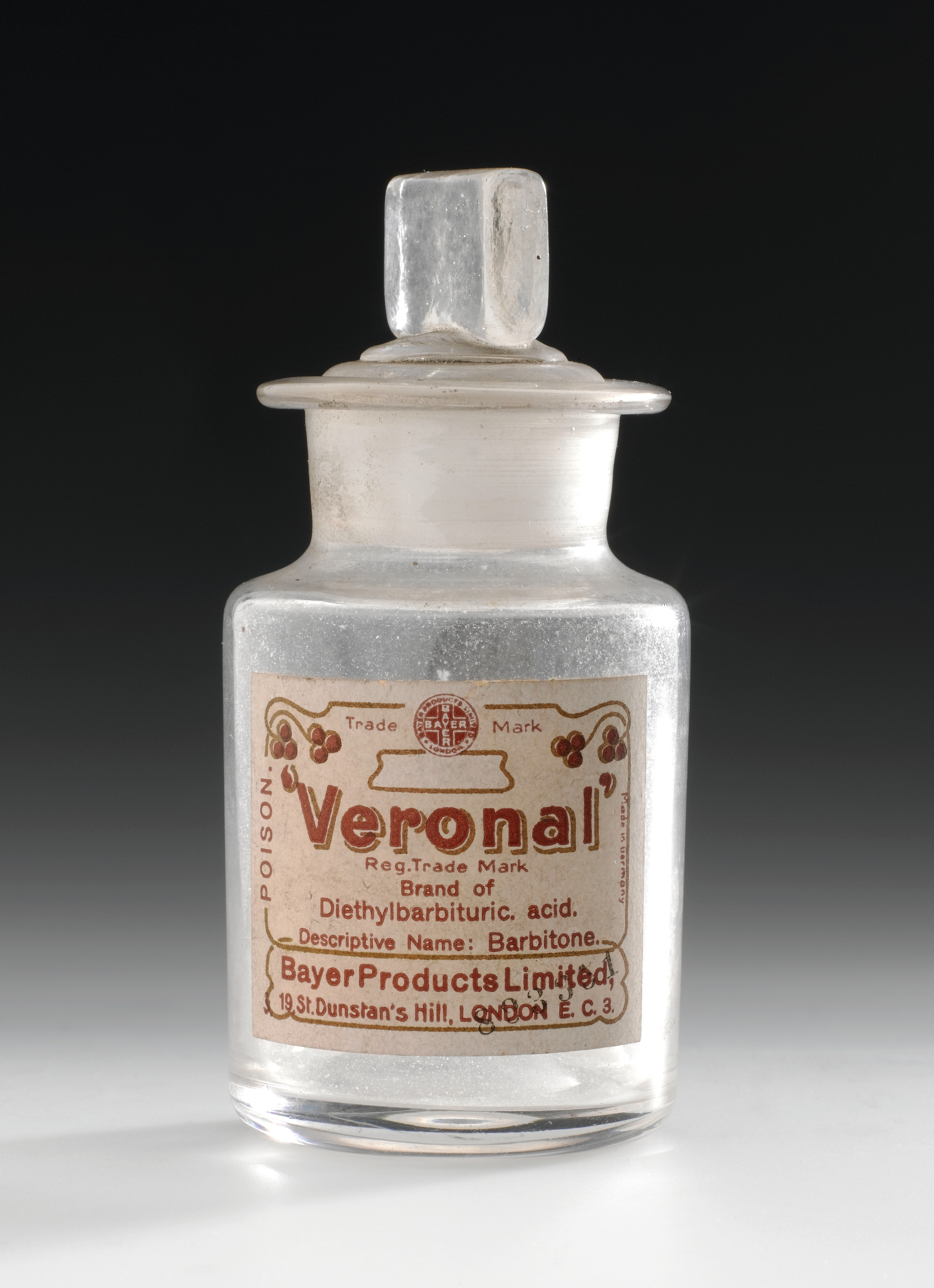
"Veronal" crystals, a barbital.

Dr James Sheppard, the story's narrator, lives with his unmarried sister, Caroline, in the English country village of King's Abbot. Telling the story in his own words, Dr Sheppard recounts being called to certify the death of a wealthy widow, Mrs Ferrars, who has committed suicide a year after her abusive husband's demise. Caroline speculates that Mrs Ferrars had poisoned her husband and has committed suicide out of remorse.

Roger Ackroyd, wealthy widower and owner of Fernly Park, tells Dr Sheppard that he needs to talk to him urgently and invites him to dinner that evening. In addition to Dr Sheppard, the dinner guests include Major Blunt, Ackroyd's sister-in-law Mrs Cecil Ackroyd, her daughter Flora and Ackroyd's personal secretary, Geoffrey Raymond. Flora tells the doctor that she is engaged to Ralph Paton, Ackroyd's stepson, though the engagement is being kept confidential.

In his study after dinner, Ackroyd tells Dr Sheppard that he had been engaged to Mrs Ferrars for several months, and that she had admitted the day before that she had indeed poisoned her husband. She was being blackmailed, and promised to reveal the blackmailer's name within 24 hours. At this point Ackroyd's butler, Parker, enters with a letter that Mrs Ferrars had posted just before she killed herself. Ackroyd apologetically asks Dr Sheppard to leave so that he can read it alone.

Shortly after arriving back home, the doctor receives a phone call from Parker. Dr Sheppard tells Caroline that Ackroyd has been found dead and then returns to Fernly Park. Parker professes to know nothing about the phone call. Unable to get a response at the study door, Sheppard and Parker break it down and find Ackroyd dead in his chair, killed with his own dagger. The letter is missing and footprints are found leading in and out of the study through an open window.

Ralph disappears and becomes the primary suspect when the footprints are found to match shoes that he owns. Flora, convinced that Ralph is innocent, asks the recently retired detective Hercule Poirot to investigate. He agrees and visits the scene of the crime, asking Dr Sheppard to accompany him.

Parker notes to Poirot that a chair in Ackroyd's study has been moved. Poirot questions the guests and staff, including Ursula Bourne, the parlourmaid, who has no alibi. The window of opportunity for the murderer after Dr Sheppard's departure appears to have been quite short since Raymond and Blunt later heard Ackroyd talking in his study, and Flora says she saw him just before going up to bed.

Poirot unravels a complex web of intrigue, and presents the missing Ralph Paton – who was, it transpires, already secretly married to Ursula when Ackroyd had decided that he should marry Flora. The pair had arranged a clandestine meeting in the garden. Flora is forced to admit she never in fact saw her uncle after dinner, leaving Raymond and Blunt as the last people to hear Ackroyd alive. Blunt confesses his love for Flora.

Alone with Dr Sheppard, Poirot reveals he knows that Dr Sheppard himself is both Ferrars' blackmailer and Ackroyd's killer. Realising that Mrs Ferrars's letter would implicate him, Sheppard had stabbed Ackroyd before leaving the study. He left publicly through the front door, then put Ralph's shoes on, ran round to the study window and climbed back in. Locking the door from the inside, he set a desk dictaphone going, playing a recording of Ackroyd's voice, and pulled out a chair to hide it from the sightline of anyone standing in the doorway. To provide the excuse for returning to Fernly Park, he had asked a patient to call him at home. While Sheppard had the study to himself for a few minutes after the crime was discovered, he slipped the dictaphone into his medical bag, and put the chair back in place. These details were concealed from his narrative, which has also now been given to Poirot.

Poirot tells Dr Sheppard the matter will be reported to the police in the morning and suggests he spare his sister Caroline by taking his own life. Sheppard completes his account of Poirot's investigation – the novel itself – with the final chapter, Apologia, serving as his suicide note.

== Principal characters ==
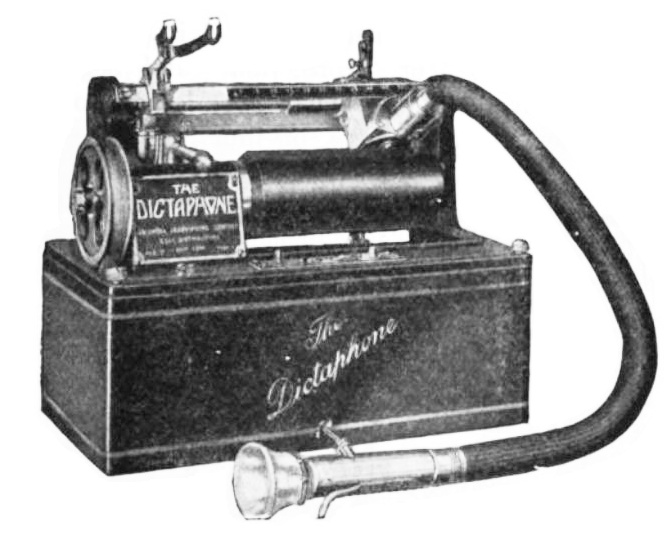
A 1920s Dictaphone

- Hercule Poirot – retired private detective, living in the village
- Dr James Sheppard – the local doctor, Poirot's assistant in his investigations, and the novel's narrator
- Caroline Sheppard – Dr Sheppard's unmarried sister
- Roger Ackroyd – the victim of the case. A wealthy businessman and widower
- Mrs Ferrars – widow who dies by suicide at the start of the novel
- Mrs Cecil Ackroyd – widow of Roger's brother Cecil
- Flora Ackroyd – Ackroyd's niece, Cecil's daughter
- Captain Ralph Paton – Ackroyd's stepson from his late wife's previous marriage
- Major Hector Blunt – Ackroyd's friend, a guest of the household
- Geoffrey Raymond – Ackroyd's personal secretary
- John Parker – Ackroyd's butler
- Elizabeth Russell – Ackroyd's housekeeper
- Charles Kent – Russell's illegitimate son
- Ursula Bourne – Ackroyd's parlourmaid
- Inspector Davis – local police inspector for King's Abbot
- Inspector Raglan – police Inspector
- Colonel Melrose – chief constable for the county

== Narrative voice and structure ==
The novel is narrated by Dr James Sheppard, who becomes Poirot's assistant, in place of Captain Hastings who has married and settled in the Argentine. It includes an unexpected plot twist towards the end, when Dr Sheppard reveals he has throughout been an unreliable narrator, using literary techniques to conceal his guilt without writing anything untrue (e.g., "I did what little had to be done" at the point where he slipped the dictaphone into his bag and moved the chair).

== Literary significance and reception ==
The review in The Times Literary Supplement began, "This is a well-written detective story of which the only criticism might perhaps be that there are too many curious incidents not really connected with the crime which have to be elucidated before the true criminal can be discovered". The review concluded, "It is all very puzzling, but the great Hercule Poirot, a retired Belgian detective, solves the mystery. It may safely be asserted that very few readers will do so."

A long review in The New York Times Book Review read in part:

There are doubtless many detective stories more exciting and blood-curdling than The Murder of Roger Ackroyd, but this reviewer has recently read very few which provide greater analytical stimulation. This story, though it is inferior to them at their best, is in the tradition of Poe's analytical tales and the Sherlock Holmes stories. The author does not devote her talents to the creation of thrills and shocks, but to the orderly solution of a single murder, conventional at that, instead.... Miss Christie is not only an expert technician and a remarkably good story-teller, but she knows, as well, just the right number of hints to offer as to the real murderer. In the present case his identity is made all the more baffling through the author's technical cleverness in selecting the part he is to play in the story; and yet her non-committal characterization of him makes it a perfectly fair procedure. The experienced reader will probably spot him, but it is safe to say that he will often have his doubts as the story unfolds itself.

The Observer had high praise for the novel, especially the character Caroline:

No one is more adroit than Miss Christie in the manipulation of false clues and irrelevances and red herrings; and The Murder of Roger Ackroyd makes breathless reading from first to the unexpected last. It is unfortunate that in two important points – the nature of the solution and the use of the telephone – Miss Christie has been anticipated by another recent novel: the truth is that this particular field is getting so well ploughed that it is hard to find a virgin patch anywhere. But Miss Christie's story is distinguished from most of its class by its coherence, its reasonableness, and the fact that the characters live and move and have their being: the gossip-loving Caroline would be an acquisition to any novel.

The Scotsman found the plot to be clever and original:

When in the last dozen pages of Miss Christie's detective novel, the answer comes to the question, "Who killed Roger Ackroyd?" the reader will feel that he has been fairly, or unfairly, sold up. Up till then he has been kept balancing in his mind from chapter to chapter the probabilities for or against the eight or nine persons at whom suspicion points.... Everybody in the story appears to have a secret of his or her own hidden up the sleeve, the production of which is imperative in fitting into place the pieces in the jigsaw puzzle; and in the end it turns out that the Doctor himself is responsible for the largest bit of reticence. The tale may be recommended as one of the cleverest and most original of its kind.

Howard Haycraft, in his 1941 work, Murder for Pleasure, included the novel in his "cornerstones" list of the most influential crime novels ever written.

The English crime writer and critic Robert Barnard, in A Talent to Deceive: An appreciation of Agatha Christie, wrote, "Apart—and it is an enormous 'apart'—from the sensational solution, this is a fairly conventional Christie." He concluded that this is "A classic, but there are some better [novels by] Christie."

John Goddard wrote an analysis of whether Christie 'cheats' with her sensational solution and concluded that the charge of cheating fails.

In a biography of Christie, Laura Thompson argued that The Murder of Roger Ackroyd was the ultimate detective novel:

The Murder of Roger Ackroyd is the supreme, the ultimate detective novel. It rests upon the most elegant of all twists, the narrator who is revealed to be the murderer. This twist is not merely a function of plot: it puts the whole concept of detective fiction on an armature and sculpts it into a dazzling new shape. It was not an entirely new idea ... nor was it entirely her own idea ... but here, she realised, was an idea worth having. And only she could have pulled it off so completely. Only she had the requisite control, the willingness to absent herself from the authorial scene and let her plot shine clear.

In 1944–1946, the American literary critic Edmund Wilson attacked the entire mystery genre in a set of three columns in The New Yorker. The second, in the 20 January 1945 issue, was titled "Who Cares Who Killed Roger Ackroyd?", though it included no analysis of the novel. Wilson disliked mystery stories altogether, and chose the famous novel as the title of his piece.

In 1990, The Murder of Roger Ackroyd came in at fifth place in The Top 100 Crime Novels of All Time, a ranking by the members (all crime writers) of the Crime Writers' Association in Britain. A similar ranking was made in 1995 by the Mystery Writers of America, putting this novel in twelfth place.

Literature professor and author Pierre Bayard, in his 1998 work Qui a tué Roger Ackroyd? (Who Killed Roger Ackroyd?), argued in favour of a different murderer – Sheppard's sister, Caroline – and says that Christie subconsciously knew who the real culprit was.

In 1999, the novel was included in French newspaper Le Monde's list of the 100 Books of the Century, chosen by readers from a list of 200.

In 2013, the Crime Writers' Association voted the novel as CWA Best Ever Novel. The 600 members of CWA said it was "the finest example of the genre ever penned." It is a cornerstone of crime fiction, which "contains one of the most celebrated plot twists in crime writing history." The poll taken on the 60th anniversary of CWA also honoured Agatha Christie as the best crime novel author ever.

In the "Binge!" article of Entertainment Weekly Issue #1343–44 (26 December 2014 – 3 January 2015), the writers picked The Murder of Roger Ackroyd as an "EW and Christie favorite" on the list of the "Nine Great Christie Novels".

The character of Caroline Sheppard was later acknowledged by Christie as a possible precursor to her famous detective Miss Marple.

== Development ==
Christie revealed in her 1977 autobiography that the basic idea of the novel was given to her by her brother-in-law, James Watts of Abney Hall, who suggested a novel in which the criminal would be a Dr Watson character, which Christie considered to be a "remarkably original thought".

In March 1924 Christie also received an unsolicited letter from Lord Louis Mountbatten. He had been impressed with her previous works and wrote, courtesy of The Sketch magazine (publishers of many of her short stories at that time) with an idea and notes for a story whose basic premise mirrored the Watts suggestion. Christie acknowledged the letter and after some thought, began to write the book but to a plot line of her invention. She also acknowledged taking inspiration from the infamous case of the unsolved death of Charles Bravo, who she thought had been murdered by Dr James Manby Gully.

In December 1969 Mountbatten wrote to Christie again after having seen a performance of The Mousetrap. He mentioned his letter of the 1920s, and Christie replied, acknowledging the part he played in the conception of the book.

== Publication history ==
The story first appeared as a fifty-four part serialisation in the London Evening News from Thursday, 16 July, to Wednesday, 16 September 1925 under the title Who Killed Ackroyd? In the United States, the story was serialised in four parts in Flynn's Detective Weekly from 19 June (Volume 16, Number 2) to 10 July 1926 (Volume 16, Number 5). The text was heavily abridged and each instalment carried an uncredited illustration.

The Collins first edition of June 1926 (retailing for seven shillings and sixpence) (Note: Equivalent to £20 in 2025.) was Christie's first work placed with that publisher. "The first book that Agatha wrote for Collins was the one that changed her reputation forever; no doubt she knew, as through 1925 she turned the idea over in her mind, that here she had a winner." The first United States publisher was The Dodd Mead and Company (New York), 19 June 1926 (retailing at $2.00). (Note: Equivalent to $36 in 2025.)

By 1928, The Murder of Roger Ackroyd was available in braille through the UK's Royal National Institute for the Blind and was among the first works to be chosen for transfer to Gramophone record for their Books for the Blind library in the autumn of 1935. By 1936 it was listed as one of only eight books available in this form.

=== Book dedication ===
Christie's dedication in the book reads "To Punkie, who likes an orthodox detective story, murder, inquest, and suspicion falling on every one in turn!"

"Punkie" was the family nickname of Christie's sister and eldest sibling, Margaret ("Madge") Frary Watts (1879–1950). Despite their eleven-year age gap, the sisters remained close throughout their lives. Christie's mother first suggested to her that she should alleviate the boredom of an illness by writing a story. But soon after, when the sisters had been discussing the recently published classic detective story by Gaston Leroux, The Mystery of the Yellow Room (1908), Christie said she would like to try writing such a story. Margaret challenged her, saying that she would not be able to do it. In 1916, eight years later, Christie remembered this conversation and was inspired to write her first novel, The Mysterious Affair at Styles.

Margaret Watts wrote a play, The Claimant, based on the Tichborne Case, which enjoyed a short run in the West End at the Queen's Theatre from 11 September to 18 October 1924, two years before the book publication of The Murder of Roger Ackroyd.

=== Dustjacket blurb ===
The dustjacket blurb read as follows:

M. Poirot, the hero of The Mysterious Affair at Stiles [sic] and other brilliant pieces of detective deduction, comes out of his temporary retirement like a giant refreshed, to undertake the investigation of a peculiarly brutal and mysterious murder. Geniuses like Sherlock Holmes often find a use for faithful mediocrities like Dr Watson, and by a coincidence it is the local doctor who follows Poirot round, and himself tells the story. Furthermore, as seldom happens in these cases, he is instrumental in giving Poirot one of the most valuable clues to the mystery.

== In popular culture ==
- Gilbert Adair's 2006 locked-room mystery The Act of Roger Murgatroyd was written as "a celebration-cum-critique-cum-parody" of The Murder of Roger Ackroyd.

== Adaptations ==
=== Stage play ===
==== Alibi ====
The book formed the basis of the earliest adaptation of any work of Christie's when the play, Alibi, adapted by Michael Morton, opened at the Prince of Wales Theatre in London on 15 May 1928. It ran for 250 performances with Charles Laughton as Poirot. Laughton also starred in the Broadway run of the play, retitled The Fatal Alibi, which opened at the Booth Theatre on 8 February 1932. The American production was not as successful and closed after just 24 performances. Alibi inspired Christie to write her first stage play, Black Coffee. Christie, with her dog Peter, attended the rehearsals of Alibi and found its "novelty" enjoyable. However, "she was sufficiently irritated by the changes to the original to want to write a play of her own."

==== The Murder of Roger Ackroyd ====
In 2023, the novel was adapted for the stage by actor and Edgar award nominated playwright Mark Shanahan (not to be confused with the Irish conductor) in partnership with Agatha Christie, Ltd. The play received its first public reading at the Westport Country Playhouse in June 2023 with Santino Fontana as Dr. Sheppard and Arnie Burton as Poirot. Shortly thereafter, the world premiere production directed by Mark Shanahan opened at the Alley Theatre in Houston, Texas and featured the Alley's resident company of actors with David Sinaiko as Poirot. The Houston Chronicle reviewed the play, calling it "a whodunnit done right. This world premiere adaptation elegantly transfers Christie's rich mystery from the page to the stage..." The play opened on 21 July and ran through 27 August in a limited run as part of the Alley Theatre's Summer Chills series and was subsequently published by Concord Theatricals before receiving numerous productions. The adaptation remains mostly faithful to the book, with Shanahan stating that crafting the adaptation was a "labour of love."

=== Film ===
The play was turned into the first sound film based on a Christie work. Running 75 minutes, it was released on 28 April 1931, by Twickenham Film Studios and produced by Julius S. Hagan. Austin Trevor played Poirot, a role he reprised later that year in the film adaptation of Christie's 1930 play, Black Coffee. Alibi is considered to be a lost film.

=== Radio ===
Orson Welles adapted the novel as a one-hour radio play for the 12 November 1939 episode of The Campbell Playhouse. Welles played both Dr Sheppard and Hercule Poirot. The play was adapted by Herman J. Mankiewicz, produced by Welles and John Houseman, and directed by Welles.

Cast:
Orson Welles as Hercule Poirot and Dr Sheppard
Edna May Oliver as Caroline Sheppard
Alan Napier as Roger Ackroyd
Brenda Forbes as Mrs Ackroyd
Mary Taylor as Flora
George Coulouris as Inspector Hamstead
Ray Collins as Mr Raymond
Everett Sloane as Parker

The novel was also adapted as a 1½-hour radio play for BBC Radio 4 first broadcast on 24 December 1987. John Moffatt made the first of his many performances as Poirot. The adaptation was broadcast at 7.45pm and was recorded on 2 November of the same year; it was adapted by Michael Bakewell and produced by Enyd Williams.

Cast:
John Moffatt as Hercule Poirot
John Woodvine as Doctor Sheppard
Laurence Payne as Roger Ackroyd
Diana Olsson as Caroline Sheppard
Eva Stuart as Miss Russell
Peter Gilmore as Raymond
Zelah Clarke as Flora
Simon Cuff as Inspector Davis
Deryck Guyler as Parker
With Richard Tate, Alan Dudley, Joan Matheson, David Goodland, Peter Craze, Karen Archer and Paul Sirr

=== Television ===
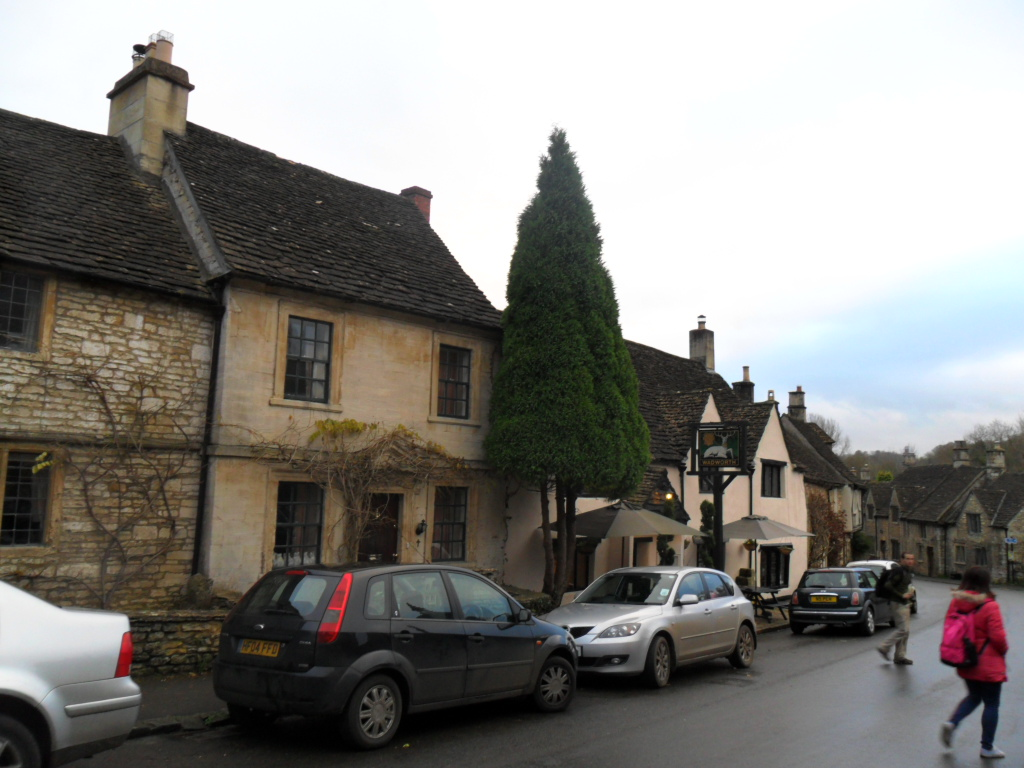
Castle Combe, Wiltshire: the house to the left of the tree was Poirot's home in the 2000 TV version.

The Murder of Roger Ackroyd was adapted as a 103-minute drama transmitted in the UK on ITV Sunday 2 January 2000, as an episode of Agatha Christie's Poirot. Location filming took place at Castle Combe in Wiltshire.

Adaptor: Clive Exton
Director: Andrew Grieve

Cast:

David Suchet as Hercule Poirot
Philip Jackson as Chief Inspector Japp
Oliver Ford Davies as Dr Sheppard
Selina Cadell as Caroline Sheppard
Roger Frost as Parker
Malcolm Terris as Roger Ackroyd
Nigel Cooke as Geoffrey Raymond
Daisy Beaumont as Ursula Bourne
Flora Montgomery as Flora Ackroyd
Vivien Heilbron as Mrs Ackroyd
Gregor Truter as Inspector Davis
Jamie Bamber as Ralph Paton
Charles Early as Constable Jones
Rosalind Bailey as Mrs Ferrars
Charles Simon as Hammond
Graham Chinn as Landlord
Clive Brunt as Naval petty officer
Alice Hart as Mary
Philip Wrigley as Postman
Phil Atkinson as Ted
Elizabeth Kettle as Mrs Folliott

The Murder of Roger Ackroyd was adapted as a 190-minute drama transmitted in Japan on Fuji Television on 14 April 2018, as a special drama, under the title "The Murder of Kuroido" (Japanese: 黒井戸殺し, Kuroido Goroshi).

Adaptor: Koki Mitani
Director: Hidenori Joho

Cast:

Mansai Nomura as Takeru Suguro, based on Hercule Poirot
Yo Oizumi as Heisuke Shiba, based on James Sheppard
Yuki Saito as Kana Shiba, based on Caroline Sheppard
Takashi Fujii as Jiro Hakamada, based on John Parker
Kenichi Endō as Rokusuke Kuroido, based on Roger Ackroyd
Mayu Matsuoka as Hanako Kuroido, based on Flora Ackroyd
Tamiyo Kusakari as Mitsuru Kuroido, based on Cecil Ackroyd
Osamu Mukai as Haruo Hyodo, based on Ralph Paton
Yasufumi Terawaki as Moichi Reizei, based on Geoffrey Raymond
Tomohiko Imai as Goro Rando, based on Hector Blunt
Kimiko Yo as Tsuneko Raisen, based on Elizabeth Russell
Sayaka Akimoto as Asuka Honda, based on Ursula Bourne
Jiro Sato as Koshiro Sodetake, based on Inspector Raglan
Yo Yoshida as Sanako Karatsu, based on Mrs Ferrars
Kazuyuki Asano as Hamose, based on Mr Hammond
Masato Wada as Kenzo Chagawa, based on Charles Kent

=== Graphic novel ===
The Murder of Roger Ackroyd was released by HarperCollins as a graphic novel adaptation on 20 August 2007, adapted and illustrated by Bruno Lachard (ISBN 0-00-725061-4). This was translated from the edition first published in France by Emmanuel Proust éditions in 2004 under the title, Le Meurtre de Roger Ackroyd.

=== Audio ===
The Wireless Theatre Company made an audio recording of The Murder of Roger Ackroyd in 2015, with Ben Whitehead as Poirot.

== See also ==
- Le Monde's 100 Books of the Century
- The Shooting Party (Chekhov novel)
