= Murder in Three Acts =

Television mystery film

- Genre: Crime; Drama; Mystery
- Based on: Three Act Tragedy by Agatha Christie
- Written by: Scott Swanton
- Directed by: Gary Nelson
- Starring: Peter Ustinov; Tony Curtis; Emma Samms; Jonathan Cecil; Fernando Allende; Pedro Armendáriz, Jr. Lisa Eichhorn; Dana Elcar; Frances Lee McCain; Marian Mercer; Diana Muldaur; Nicholas Pryor; Concetta Tomei
- Theme music composer: Alf Clausen
- Countries of origin: United Kingdom; United States
- Original language: English

Production
- Producer: Paul Waigner
- Production location: Acapulco
- Cinematography: Neil Roach
- Editor: Donald R. Rode
- Running time: 94 minutes
- Production company: Warner Bros. Television

Original release
- Network: CBS
- Release: September 30, 1986

Related
- Dead Man's Folly; Appointment with Death

Murder in Three Acts is a British-American made-for-television mystery film of 1986 produced by Warner Bros. Television, featuring Peter Ustinov as Agatha Christie's detective Hercule Poirot. Directed by Gary Nelson, it co-starred Jonathan Cecil as Hastings, Tony Curtis, and Emma Samms.

The film is based on Christie's book Three Act Tragedy (1934), published in the US under the title Murder in Three Acts. It was Ustinov's third and last portrayal of Poirot on television, and fifth overall including the feature films that preceded the TV movies.

== Plot ==
Hercule Poirot joins his assistant Arthur Hastings in Acapulco, Mexico, where Hastings is staying. They go to a party at which the other guests include the writer Janet Crisp, the American actor Charles Cartwright, a clergyman called Babbington, Daisy Eastman and her daughter Egg, Dr Bartholomew Strange, and Ricardo Montoya. Babbington dies of poisoning, then Strange is poisoned, too, and Poirot hunts the murderer.

== Cast ==
- Peter Ustinov as Hercule Poirot
- Jonathan Cecil as Captain Arthur Hastings
- Tony Curtis as Charles Cartwright
- Emma Samms as Jennifer "Egg" Eastman
- Dana Elcar as Dr Bartholomew Strange
- Lisa Eichhorn as Cynthia Dayton
- Nicholas Pryor as Freddie Dayton
- Fernando Allende as Ricardo Montoya
- Pedro Armendáriz, Jr. as Colonel Mateo
- Frances Lee McCain as Miss Milray
- Marian Mercer as Daisy Eastman
- Diana Muldaur as Angela Stafford
- Concetta Tomei as Janet Crisp
- Philip Guilmant as Rev. Mr Babbington
- Jacqueline Evans as Mrs Babbington
- Martin LaSalle as Doctor
- Alma Levy as Nurse
- Julio Monterde as Manager

== Background ==
In 1974, Murder on the Orient Express was released, starring Albert Finney as Hercule Poirot. As Finney was unable to reprise his role for the sequel, Death on the Nile (1978), Peter Ustinov was cast in the part and reprised it for Evil Under the Sun in 1982, Thirteen at Dinner (1985), Dead Man's Folly, and Murder in Three Acts (1986).

The main change from the original story Three Act Tragedy by Agatha Christie is the relocation of the action from London to Acapulco. In the book, Poirot's assistant is Satterthwaite but in the film, Arthur Hastings (Jonathan Cecil) replaces Satterthwaite and is reinstated in his usual role. The novel's English theatrical actor Sir Charles Cartwright turns into Charles Cartwright (Tony Curtis), an American movie star.

A version made in 2010 in the Poirot series starring David Suchet restored the title "Three Act Tragedy", as well as reinstating Sir Charles Cartwright (played by Martin Shaw) as an English stage actor.

Another screen adaptation in 1988, Appointment with Death, was Ustinov's last portrayal of the Belgian detective.
