= Dead Man's Folly (film) =

Television mystery film

- Based on: Dead Man's Folly by Agatha Christie
- Written by: Rod Browning
- Directed by: Clive Donner
- Starring: Peter Ustinov; Jean Stapleton; Constance Cummings; Tim Pigott-Smith; Jonathan Cecil; Kenneth Cranham; Susan Wooldridge; Christopher Guard; Jeff Yagher; Nicollette Sheridan
- Music by: John Addison
- Countries of origin: United Kingdom; United States
- Original language: English

Production
- Producer: Neil Hartley
- Production locations: Cliveden, Taplow, Berkshire, England; Harrods, Brompton Road, Knightsbridge, London, England; West Wycombe Park, West Wycombe, Buckinghamshire, England
- Cinematography: Curtis Clark
- Editor: Donald R. Rode
- Running time: 94 minutes
- Production company: Warner Bros. Television

Original release
- Network: CBS
- Release: January 8, 1986

Related
- Thirteen at Dinner; Murder in Three Acts

Dead Man's Folly is a 1986 British-American made-for-television mystery film featuring Agatha Christie's Belgian detective Hercule Poirot. It is based on Christie's 1956 novel Dead Man's Folly. The film was directed by Clive Donner and starred Peter Ustinov as Poirot.

The cast included Jean Stapleton, Tim Pigott-Smith, Jonathan Cecil, Constance Cummings, and Nicollette Sheridan. It was shot largely on location at West Wycombe Park in Buckinghamshire, England.

== Plot introduction ==
Hercule Poirot and his associate, Captain Arthur Hastings, are called in by his eccentric mystery author friend, Ariadne Oliver, to a manor house in Devon. Oliver is organizing a "Murder Hunt" game for a local fair to be held at Nass House, but she is troubled by something on which she cannot quite put her finger.

Things take a turn for the worse when during the "Murder Hunt", Marlene Tucker, the girl playing the "dead" body, is murdered for real. Soon afterwards, Hattie Stubbs, the lady of the manor, mysteriously disappears and Merdell, an old man's body, is pulled from the river. Poirot must discover who and what are behind these seemingly unconnected events.

== Cast ==
- Peter Ustinov as Hercule Poirot
- Jean Stapleton as Ariadne Oliver
- Constance Cummings as Amy Folliat
- Tim Pigott-Smith as Sir George Stubbs
- Jonathan Cecil as Captain Arthur Hastings
- Kenneth Cranham as Detective Inspector Bland
- Susan Wooldridge as Amanda Brewis
- Christopher Guard as Alec Legge
- Jeff Yagher as Eddie South
- Nicollette Sheridan as Hattie Stubbs
- Ralph Arliss as Michael Weyman
- Caroline Langrishe as Sally Legge
- Alan Parnaby as The Boatman
- Pippa Hinchley as Marlene Tucker
- Jimmy Gardner as Merdell

== Sequels ==
In 1974, Murder on the Orient Express was released, starring Albert Finney as Hercule Poirot. As Finney was unable to reprise his role in 1978, for the sequel, Death on the Nile, Peter Ustinov was cast. He reprised the role for Evil Under the Sun in 1982 and later committed to several made-for-television films. Apart from Dead Man's Folly, Murder in Three Acts and Thirteen at Dinner were released. Another screen adaption of one of Christie's novels in 1988, Appointment with Death, marked Ustinov's final portrayal of the Belgian detective.
