= Ustinov =

Ustinov (Russian: Устинов) is a surname of Russian origin, created from the given name Iustin. The feminine form is Ustinova (Russian: Устинова). People with this name include:

- Alexander Ustinov (born 1976), K-1 fighter and boxer
- Aleksandr Ustinov, (1968-1996) Russian rower
- Dmitriy Ustinov (1908–1984), the Soviet Union's defence minister from 1976 to 1984
- Ivan Ustinov (1920–2020), Soviet military counterintelligence officer
- Jona von Ustinov a.k.a. "Klop" Ustinov (1892–1962), journalist and diplomat, father of Sir Peter Ustinov
- Maksim Ustinov, Russian football player
- Pavel Ustinov, Russian activist and actor
- Sir Peter Ustinov (1921–2004), born Peter Alexander von Ustinov, British actor, writer, dramatist and raconteur.
- Plato von Ustinov (1840–1918), Russian aristocrat who lived in Jaffa, father of Jonah von Ustinov
- Tamara Ustinov (born 1945), British actress
- Vitaly Ustinov, (1910-2006), Russian-Canadian Orthodox Priest
- Vladimir Ustinov (born 1953), Russian politician
- Vyacheslav Ustinov (born 1957), Russian and Soviet athlete
- Viktor Ustinov, (born 1974), Uzkek hammer thrower

== See also ==
- Ustinov College, University of Durham, England
- Izhevsk, renamed in Dimitri Ustinov's honour in 1985, but was reverted to Izhevsk two years later.
- Russian cruiser Marshal Ustinov, named after Dmitriy Ustinov.
