= Dear Me =

Dear Me may refer to:

- Dear Me (book), 1977 autobiography by Peter Ustinov
- "Dear Me" (Lorrie Morgan song), released in 1989
- "Dear Me" (Slushii song), a 2017 song by Slushii from the album Out of Light
- "Dear Me", a 2020 song by Taeyeon from the repackage edition of her 2019 album Purpose

== See also ==
- Baap Re Baap (disambiguation)
