= Evil Under the Sun (1982 film) =

Mystery film by Guy Hamilton

- American theatrical release poster
- Directed by: Guy Hamilton
- Screenplay by: Anthony Shaffer
- Based on: Evil Under the Sun by Agatha Christie
- Produced by: John Brabourne; Richard Goodwin
- Starring: Peter Ustinov; Jane Birkin; Colin Blakely; Nicholas Clay; James Mason; Roddy McDowall; Sylvia Miles; Denis Quilley; Diana Rigg; Maggie Smith
- Cinematography: Christopher Challis
- Edited by: Richard Marden
- Music by: Cole Porter (arranged and conducted by John Lanchbery)
- Production companies: EMI Films; Titan Productions; Mersham Productions Ltd.
- Distributed by: Columbia-EMI-Warner Distributors
- Release date: 5 March 1982
- Running time: 117 minutes
- Country: United Kingdom
- Language: English
- Budget: $10 million
- Box office: $6.1 million (U.S. only)

Evil Under the Sun is a 1982 British mystery film directed by Guy Hamilton, based on the 1941 novel of the same name by Agatha Christie. Peter Ustinov stars as the Belgian detective Hercule Poirot, whom he had previously portrayed in Death on the Nile (1978).

== Plot ==
A female hiker finds a dead woman on the North York Moors in England. The strangled victim is identified as Alice Ruber.

Four months later, an insurance company asks detective Hercule Poirot to examine an expensive diamond belonging to millionaire Sir Horace Blatt. Poirot identifies it as a fake, but is assured by Sir Horace that the original was purchased at Tiffany’s in New York for his mistress, actress Arlena Stuart Marshall; she apparently returned a paste replica after their split. Poirot agrees to meet Arlena at an exclusive hotel on an island in the Adriatic Sea to probe the mystery. The hotel was the King of Tyrania's summer palace, gifted to his former mistress, ex-actress Daphne Castle.

Arlena is on holiday with Kenneth, her new husband. She is emotionally abusive to her stepdaughter, Linda, and flirts openly with Patrick Redfern, who is holidaying on the island with his wife, Christine. Kenneth turns to his old friend, Daphne for support. She is horrified by how Arlena treats Kenneth and Linda and reveals that Arlena arranged for Patrick to be on the island. Also at the resort are theatrical producers Odell and Myra Gardener, who are experiencing financial hardship because Arlena left a major show of theirs and is refusing a role in another. Likewise, Arlena is causing trouble for writer Rex Brewster, who has already spent his advance royalties for Arlena's tell-all biography, which she now refuses to approve for release.

Early on the third morning, Arlena goes by paddle-boat to Ladder Bay for an assignation with Patrick. He arrives by powerboat with Myra, and, upon approaching Arlena, calls out to Myra that Arlena has been strangled.

Poirot begins to investigate the murder, but all of the guests have an alibi. Kenneth claims to have been in his room typing at the time of the crime. Christine was with Linda at Gull Cove, and did not leave until 11:55 for a 12:30 tennis match. Sir Horace argued with Arlena at Ladder Bay and returned the fake diamond at 11:30, with Arlena promising an explanation that evening; his alibi is confirmed by both his yacht crew and Daphne. Poirot found the bauble in a grotto when examining the crime scene. Patrick left the hotel with Myra minutes before 12:00 PM, seeing Sir Horace's yacht approaching, and hearing the commemorative noon cannon firing. Rex met the swimming Linda when entering Gull Cove at noon, and reports that a bottle flung from the top of a cliff nearly hit him. Odell was seen reading by Daphne and her staff. He claims low water pressure hindered his 12:15 wash before tennis, but nobody admits to bathing at that time.

Assembling the suspects together, Poirot accuses the Redferns of the crime. He asserts that Christine knocked out Arlena and hid her in the grotto (where he had detected Arlena's perfume in the air), then donned her outfit and applied makeup to simulate a suntan and posed as Arlena's body for Myra to see. After Myra went for help, Patrick strangled Arlena and placed her body on the beach.

Poirot calls Christine's alibi into question by proposing that she set Linda's watch twenty minutes ahead, suggested the girl wear a swim cap to muffle the sound of the noon cannon, and corrected the watch before leaving to attack Arlena. Once Myra left the beach, Christine still would have had time to toss away the lotion bottle—which almost hit Rex—and wash off her "tan"—accounting for the drop in water pressure—before the tennis match. The Redferns scoff at Poirot's accusations, and taunt that he has provided neither motive, nor proof.

Patrick pays for his hotel stay by cheque, signing the "R" in "Redfern" in a distinctive way that Poirot recognises as being the same way "Felix Ruber", husband of the well-insured Yorkshire moor victim, signed his name. Poirot states that sending for pictures will prove this, as well as that the hiker who found the body, at a time when the husband had an alibi, was Christine. Exposed, Patrick does not resist when Poirot removes a pipe, which he never actually smokes, from his lips, empties its bowl, and reveals the real diamond. Redfern then punches Poirot before he and Christine are arrested and taken away from the island by boat. Daphne informs Poirot that he will be rewarded by the Kingdom of Tyrania for his work before he and the others depart the island.

== Cast ==
- Peter Ustinov as Hercule Poirot
- Colin Blakely as Sir Horace Blatt
- Jane Birkin as Christine Redfern
- Nicholas Clay as Patrick Redfern
- Maggie Smith as Daphne Castle
- Roddy McDowall as Rex Brewster
- Sylvia Miles as Myra Gardener
- James Mason as Odell Gardener
- Denis Quilley as Kenneth Marshall
- Diana Rigg as Arlena Stuart Marshall
- Emily Hone as Linda Marshall
- Richard Vernon as Flewitt of The London Trojan Insurance Company

== Production ==
EMI Films had a big success with Murder on the Orient Express (1974), produced by Richard Goodwin and John Brabourne. In 1975, head of production Nat Cohen announced the same producers would adapt Christie's Poirot novel Evil Under the Sun as part of a slate of six films worth £6 million, also including Spanish Fly (1975), Aces High (1976), The Likely Lads (1976) and Sweeney! (1977). All of these films were made, except Evil Under the Sun. This was, in part, due to the 1976 death of screenwriter Paul Dehn, who had adapted Orient Express and was to adapt Evil Under the Sun.

In May 1977, EMI announced Brabourne and Goodwin would make not one, but two, Christie adaptations: Death on the Nile and Evil Under the Sun. The former, which introduced Peter Ustinov as Hercule Poirot, was released in 1978, but it was not until March 1981 that Barry Spikings announced EMI would finally make Evil Under the Sun, at a budget of $10 million. In between, Brabourne and Goodwin produced another Christie adaptation, The Mirror Crack'd (1980), starring Angela Lansbury as Miss Marple. Goodwin said: "What we try to do is provide terrific escapist entertainment that you can take your kids to and make it look beautiful at the same time."

The film's screenplay was written by Anthony Shaffer, who had worked on Murder on the Orient Express and wrote Death on the Nile, and an uncredited Barry Sandler, who had worked on The Mirror Crack'd. The adaptation stayed fairly close to Christie's work, but removed minor characters, truncated scenes for time constraints, and added humorous elements that were not present in the novel. The characters of Major Barry, Inspector Colgate, and Reverend Stephen Lane were omitted from the film; the female character of Emily Brewster was written as a man named Rex Brewster (played by Roddy McDowall); and the characters of Rosamund Darnley and Mrs. Castle were merged, creating Daphne Castle (played by Maggie Smith). Additionally, the novel was set in Devon, but the film was set on an Adriatic island in the fictional kingdom of Tyrania (based on Albania).

Guy Hamilton, who had previously directed The Mirror Crack'd, returned to direct Evil Under the Sun. He said: "I think one of the reasons the books and films are so popular is that people know what to expect, though now we try to add a few surprises." Costumes were designed by Anthony Powell, who had won the Academy Award for Best Costume Design in 1979 for his work on Death on the Nile.

=== Casting ===
The film marks Ustinov's second film appearance as Poirot, having played the detective four years earlier in Death on the Nile. Comparing the two films, he said: "I think [Evil Under the Sun is] a better script than the first one I did. And much more fun." About Poirot, he declared: "I find Poirot a very engaging character, although he's quite awful, really. I should hate to know him. He's very vain, self-contained and finicky. People have asked me why he never married – because he couldn't solve it, of course. An ancillary reason is that he's very much in love with himself. He has probably been quite true to himself. I don't think he's ever cheated on himself."

As well as Ustinov, Maggie Smith and Jane Birkin also appeared in both Death on the Nile and Evil Under the Sun, though they portrayed a different character in each film. Additionally, Denis Quilley and Colin Blakely had appeared in Murder on the Orient Express.

Diana Rigg was cast in Evil Under the Sun as what she called "the archetypal actress bitch."

Sylvia Miles based her role on Broadway producer Terry Allen Kramer, saying that "I never met her, but I figured that's what a producer should be like."

About the casting of Nicholas Clay, Hamilton said: "I was looking for someone like Stewart Granger or Michael Rennie – handsome, dashing, physical, romantic. Nick has it all. A fine sense of timing, the right looks and a good physique."

=== Filming locations ===
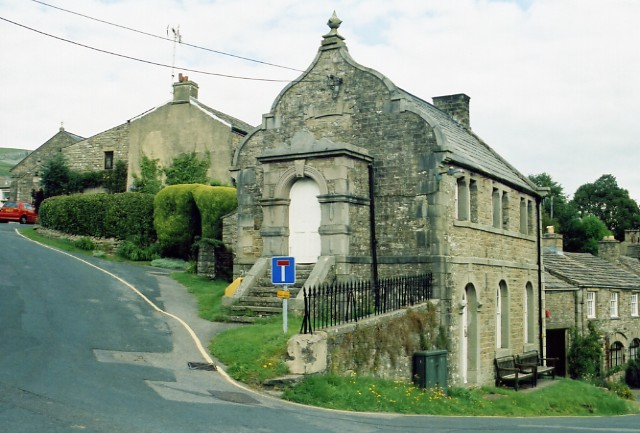
Literary Institute in Muker, Swaledale

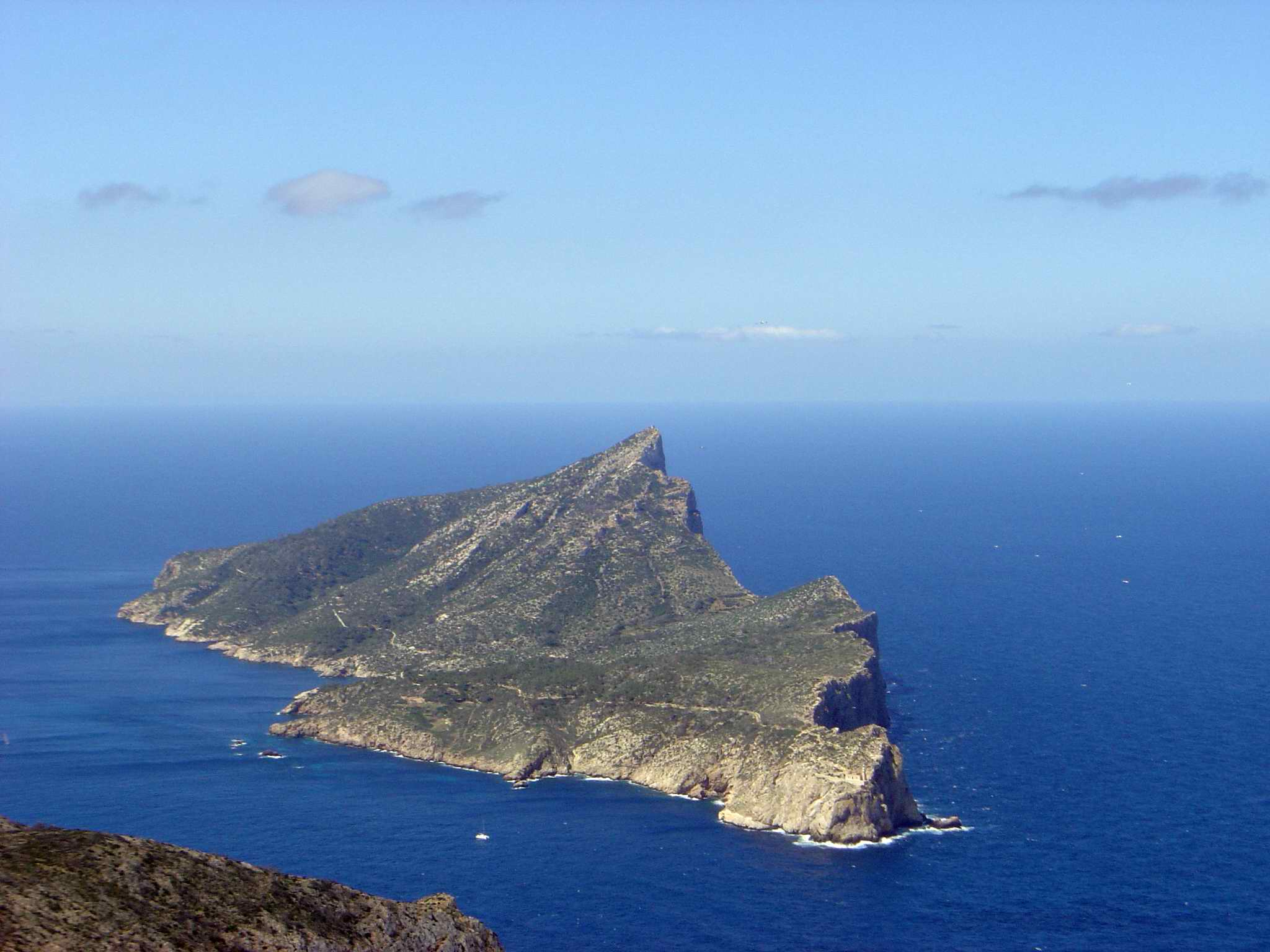
Sa Dragonera, located off the west coast of Mallorca

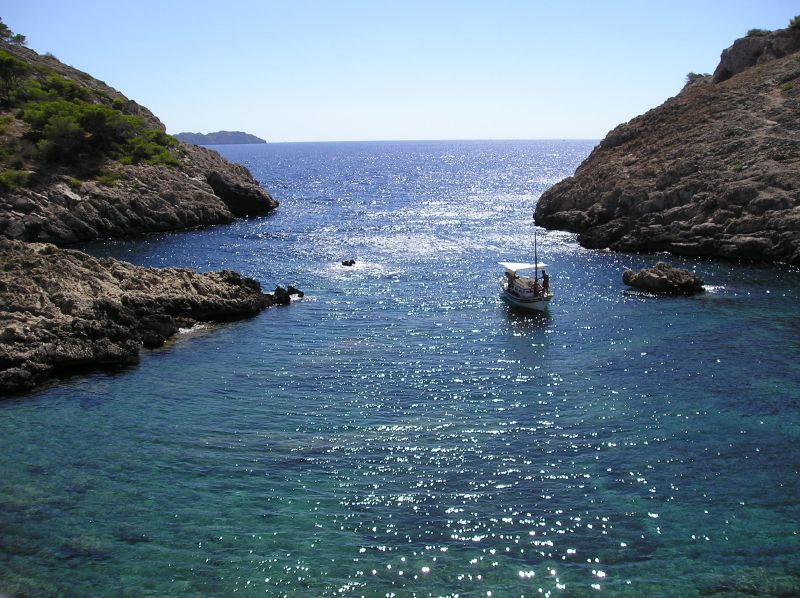
Cala d'en Monjo

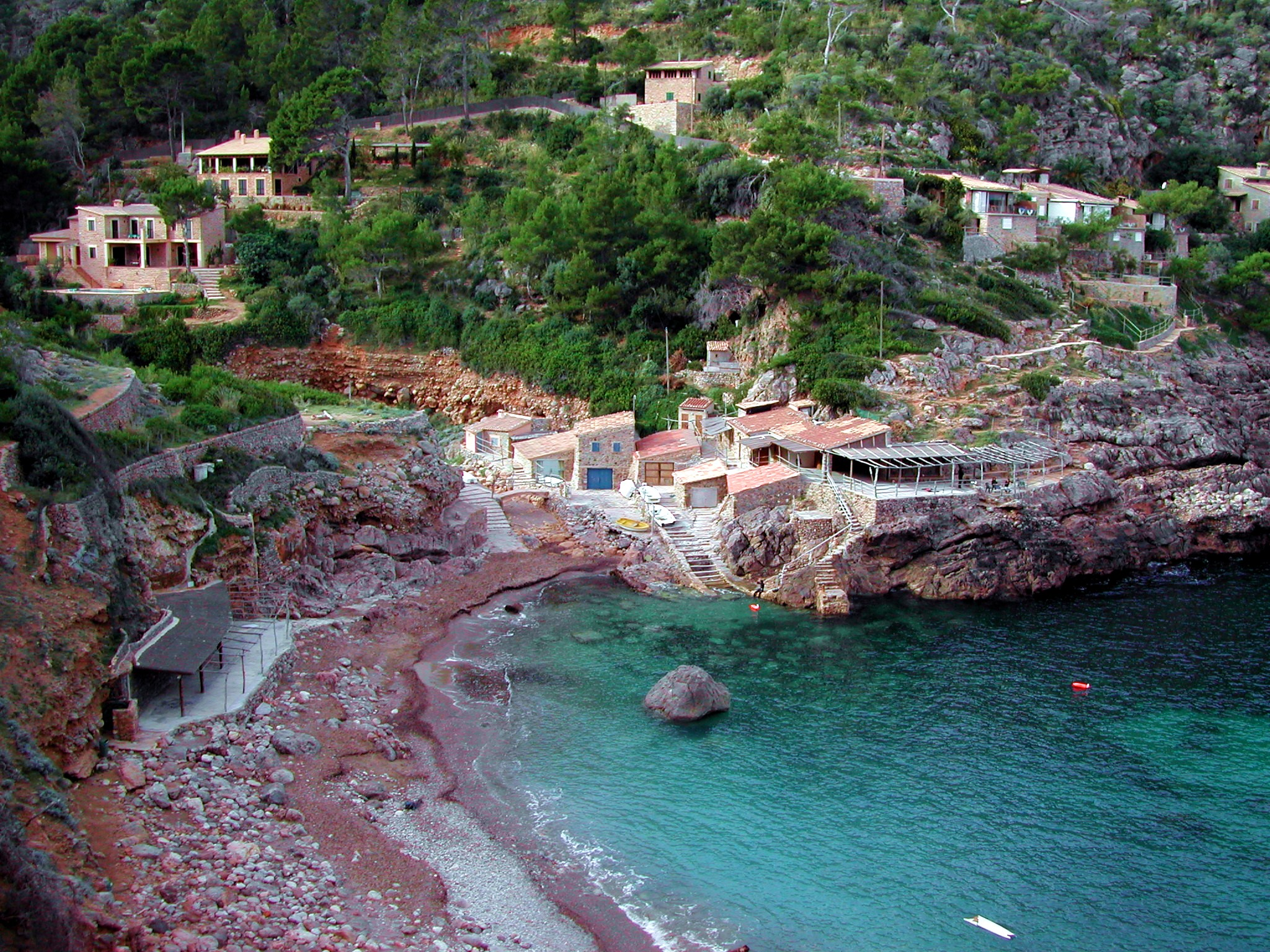
Cala de Deià

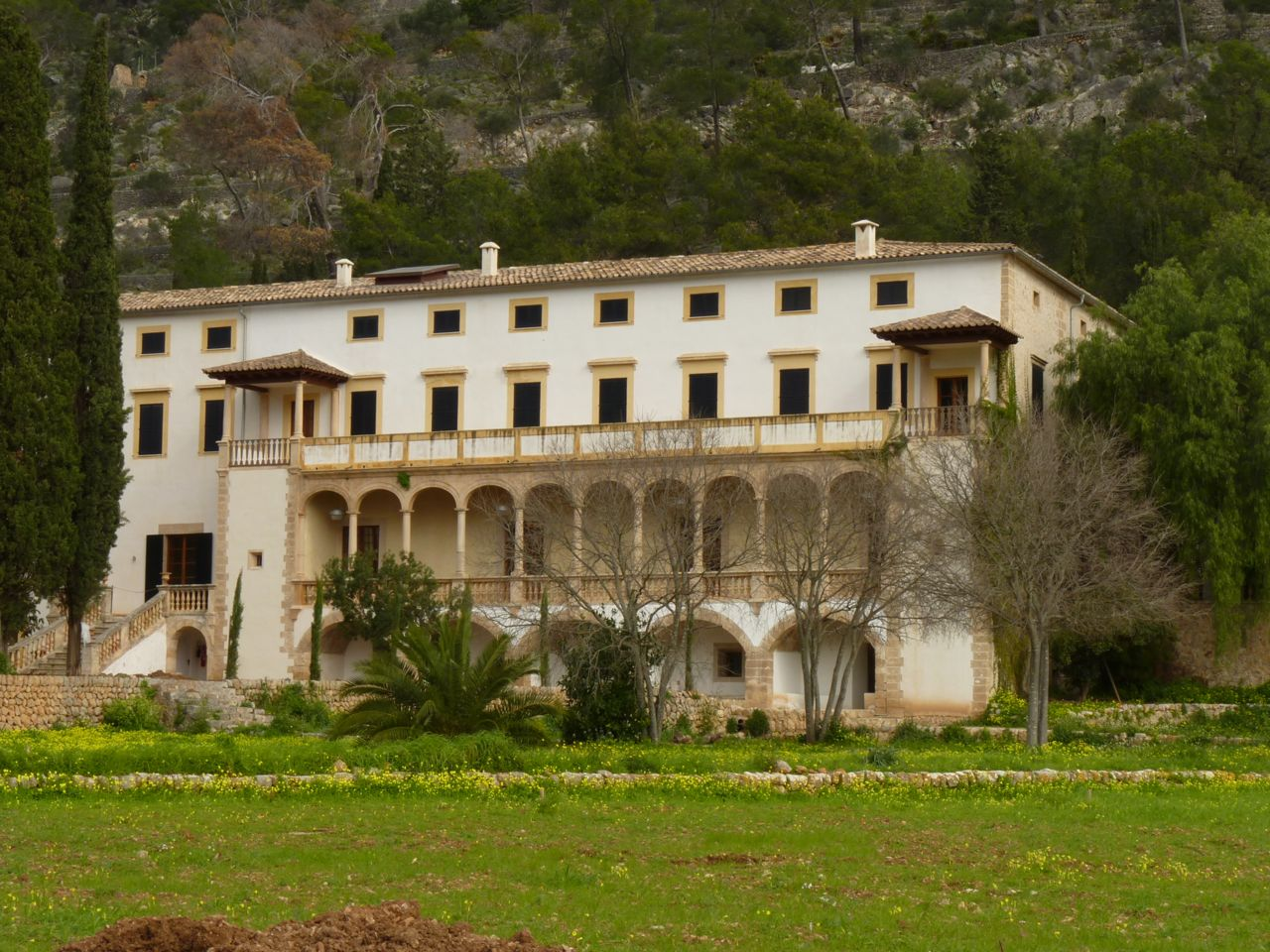
Raixa

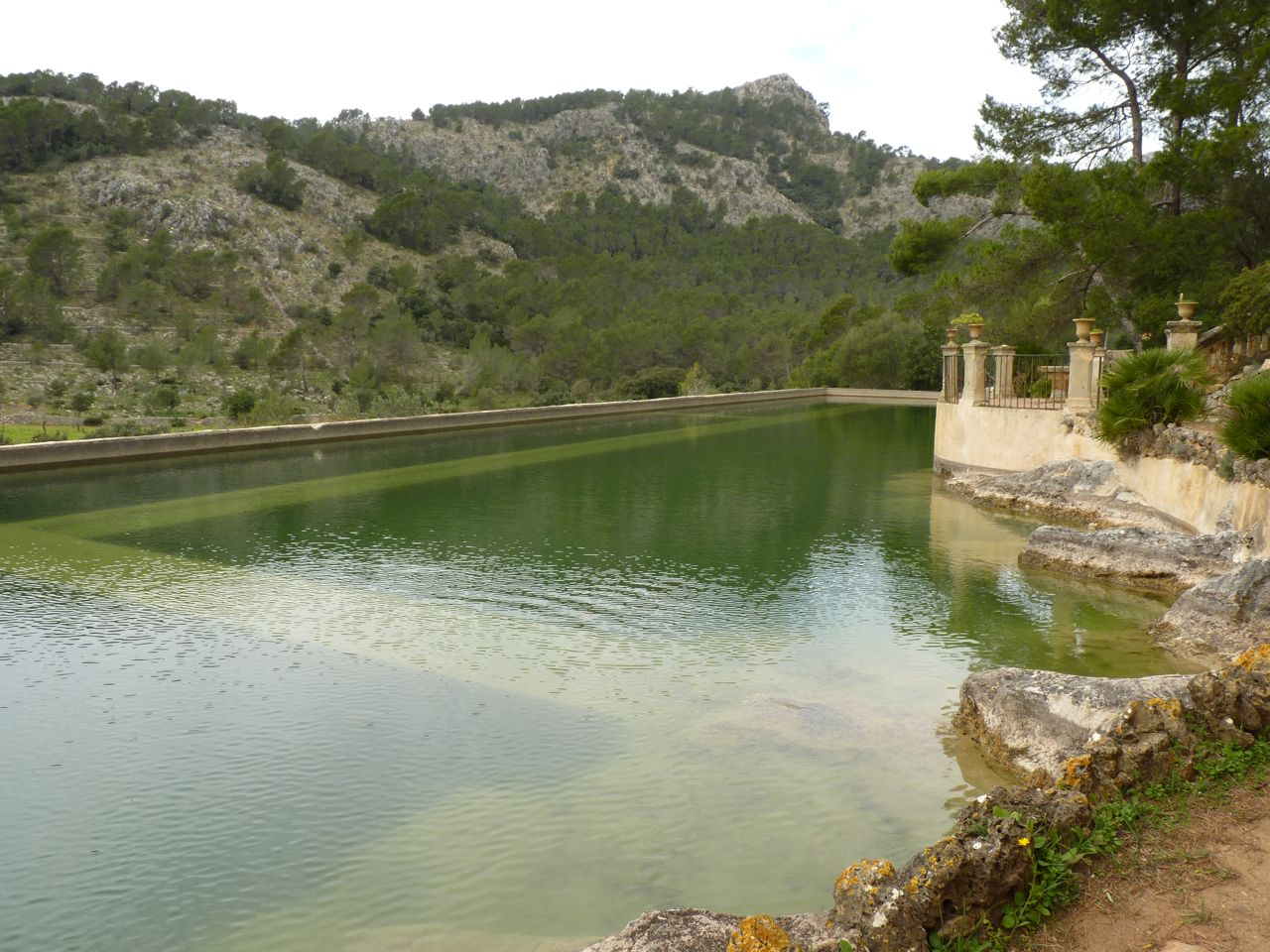
Raixa

The film was shot at Lee International Studios in Wembley, London, and on location in Mallorca, Spain in May 1981. The Mallorca location was suggested by Hamilton, who had lived there for several years.

The actual island used for aerial shots is Sa Dragonera, an uninhabited islet with "natural park" status, located just off the west coast of Mallorca near Sant Elm. Other locations used were Cala Blanca (Note: Cala Blanca is located at 39.536674°N 2.407315°E.) as "Ladder Bay", and offshore at Sant Elm (Note: Sant Elm is located at 39.577317°N 2.350656°E.) for the south of France (Sir Horace's boat scenes). Cala d'en Monjo (Note: Cala d'en Monjo is located at 39°31′44.72″N 002°25′50.49″E.) was used for the exterior of Daphne's hotel and cove; the hotel itself was a private estate later bought by the Mallorca Island Council (along with the Calvià municipality) and demolished to its foundations when the land it is on was made a natural park. "Gull Cove" is the remote Cala en Feliu on the Formentor Peninsula. (Note: Cala en Feliu is located at 39°55′48.40″N 003°09′48.23″E.) The other hotel exterior shots were filmed at the Raixa Estate (Note: The Raixa Estate is located at 39°40′50.9628″N 002°40′22.2528″E.) in Bunyola, a large Italianate villa surrounded by gardens; once owned by the German designer Jil Sander, it was subsequently purchased by the Island Council of Mallorca. Finally, Poirot boards a launch to the island from Cala de Deià, (Note: Cala de Deià is located at 39.7602°N 2.6413°E.) the cove below the village of Deià.

The early scenes set on the moors were shot in the Yorkshire Dales, England, with the exterior of the police station being the former Literary Institute in Muker, Swaledale.

== Reception ==
According to Nat Cohen of EMI, the film "did not do as well as the other two Poirot pictures. In the first place, we had only one grade A actor in it... and the rest were good but regarded as Grade B at the box-office. Another thing: artists’ fees had escalated beyond belief or budgeting."

Anthony Shaffer later wrote in his 2001 memoir that the film "didn’t quite do the same business as Nile at the outset, but I understand that it is catching up, and it is still my favourite. At any rate it certainly far outstrips the perfectly dreadful Christie film Appointment with Death, which I part-wrote."

On the review aggregator website Rotten Tomatoes, 86% of 14 critics' reviews are positive.

== Award nomination ==
Award nomination
Award	Category	Subject	Result
Edgar Award	Best Motion Picture	Anthony Shaffer	Nominated

== Sequels ==
While promoting the film, Peter Ustinov said they were going to do another Poirot film set in Jordan, but could not make it yet because the country did not have the necessary facilities, though producer Goodwin said he did not want to make another film in the series for a few years, stating: "We don't want to overdo them". The project to which Ustinov was referring likely was Appointment with Death, which was later produced by Cannon Films and released in 1988, with Ustinov returning as Poirot and Shaffer co-writing the script, his fourth adaptation of a Christie novel.

Evil Under the Sun was followed by several made-for-television films starring Ustinov as Poirot in 1985–6 (Thirteen at Dinner, Murder in Three Acts, and Dead Man's Folly), as well as the feature film Appointment with Death in 1988, which marked his final portrayal of the Belgian detective.

== Home media ==
Evil Under the Sun was released on a Region B Blu-ray in 2014, and on 4K UHD Blu-ray by Studiocanal in November 2025, followed by a North American release by Kino Lorber on January 20, 2026.
