= Jonathan Cecil =

English actor (1939–2011)

- Born: Jonathan Hugh Gascoyne-Cecil; 22 February 1939; Westminster, County of London, England
- Died: 22 September 2011 (aged 72); Charing Cross Hospital, Hammersmith, England
- Education: London Academy of Music and Dramatic Art
- Occupation: Actor
- Years active: 1963–2011
- Spouse(s): Vivien Heilbron (m. 1963; div. 1975) Anna Sharkey (m. 1976–2011)
- Father: Lord David Cecil

Jonathan Hugh Gascoyne-Cecil (22 February 1939 – 22 September 2011), known as Jonathan Cecil, was an English actor.

== Early life ==
Cecil was born on 22 February 1939, in Westminster, the son of Lord David Cecil and the grandson of the 4th Marquess of Salisbury. His other grandfather was the literary critic Sir Desmond MacCarthy. He was the great-grandson of the Conservative Prime Minister, the 3rd Marquess of Salisbury.

Brought up in Oxford, where his father was Goldsmith Professor of English, Cecil was educated at Eton, where he played small parts in school plays, and at New College, Oxford, where he read modern languages, specialising in French, and continued with amateur acting in the Oxford University Dramatic Society.

At Oxford, his friends included Dudley Moore and Alan Bennett. In a production of Ben Jonson's Bartholomew Fair, he played a lunatic called Troubadour and a woman who sells pigs. Of his early acting at Oxford, Cecil said

I was still stiff and awkward, but this was rather effective for comedy parts, playing sort of comic servants in plays, and in the cabaret nights we had.

After Oxford, he spent two years training for an acting career at the London Academy of Music and Dramatic Art, where he was taught (amongst others) by Michael MacOwan and Vivian Matalon and where his contemporaries included Ian McKellen and Derek Jacobi.

== Career ==
Cecil's first television appearance was in playing a leading role opposite Vanessa Redgrave in "Maggie", an episode of the BBC television series First Night transmitted in February 1964, which he later called "a baptism by fire because I was being seen by half the nation". After that he spent eighteen months in repertory at Salisbury, of which he later commented, "You learnt how to make an entrance and make an exit." His parts at Salisbury included the Dauphin in Saint Joan, Disraeli in Portrait of a Queen, Trinculo in The Tempest, and "all the Shakespeare".

His first West End part came in May 1965 in Julian Mitchell's dramatisation of A Heritage and Its History at the Phoenix, in which he got good notices, and his next was in a Beaumont production of Peter Ustinov's Half-Way up the Tree, directed by Sir John Gielgud.

In film and television, Cecil almost always played upper class characters. His work included the role of Cummings in The Diary of a Nobody (1964), and in the series of adaptations from P. G. Wodehouse, What Ho! Jeeves (1973–1981) he played the recurring character Bingo Little. He was Captain Cadbury in the Dad's Army episode "Things That Go Bump in the Night" (1973) and Mr Herbert in all six episodes of Oh Happy Band! (1980), both produced by David Croft, Bertie Wooster in Thank You, P. G. Wodehouse (1981), Ricotin in Federico Fellini's And the Ship Sails On (1983), and Captain Hastings (to Peter Ustinov's Hercule Poirot) in Thirteen at Dinner (1985), Dead Man's Folly and Murder in Three Acts (both 1986). In 2009 he appeared in an episode of Midsomer Murders. He has been called "one of the finest upper-class-twits of his era".

He also worked in radio, where his credits included The Hitchhiker's Guide to the Galaxy and The Brightonomicon. He also appeared in The Next Programme Follows Almost Immediately, playing characters with foreign accents. Additionally, he stood in for Derek Nimmo in the role of the Bishop's Chaplain, the Reverend Mervyn Noote, in the second series of the radio episodes of the ecclesiastical sitcom All Gas and Gaiters, which ran for twenty episodes.

He narrated audio books of many of P. G. Wodehouse's books, performing voice characterisations for each character. He might have been more strongly identified with narration of the series than any other actor.

Cecil wrote occasionally for The Spectator and The Times Literary Supplement. In one piece he noted

Handsome young male actors of the older school have tended, in my experience, to be somewhat vapid and vain. I write this in no spirit of envy — comic and character actors, like proverbial blondes, usually have more fun.

He also admitted that "most of my experience has been in comedy, that's the way life has taken me ... if I have any regrets, it's that I didn't do parts with more depth".

== Personal life ==
Cecil was married twice. He met the actress Vivien Heilbron when both were studying at the London Academy of Music and Dramatic Art, and they were married in 1963. They later divorced. In 1976, Cecil married secondly the actress Anna Sharkey, whom he had met while appearing at the Mermaid Theatre in 1972.

Cecil died from pneumonia on 22 September 2011 at Charing Cross Hospital, Hammersmith, aged 72. He had suffered from emphysema.

== Filmography ==
- Nothing But the Best (1964) – Guards Officer (uncredited)
- The Ordeal of Richard Feverel (1964) – Giles Jinkson
- The Yellow Rolls-Royce (1964) – Young Man (uncredited)
- The Great St Trinian's Train Robbery (1966) – Man (uncredited)
- Otley (1968) – Young Man at Party
- The Rise and Rise of Michael Rimmer (1970) – Spot
- Lust for a Vampire (1971) – Biggs
- To Catch a Spy (1971) – British Attaché
- Up the Front (1972) – Captain Nigel Phipps Fortescue
- Dad's Army (1973) – Captain Cadbury
- Are You Being Served (1975) – Customer
- Barry Lyndon (1975) – Lt. Jonathan Fakenham
- Under the Doctor (1976) – Rodney Harrington-Harrington / Lord Woodbridge
- Joseph Andrews (1977) – Fop One
- Rising Damp (1980) – Boutique Assistant
- History of the World, Part I (1981) – Poppinjay (The French Revolution)
- Farmers Arms (1983) – Mr. Brown
- And the Ship Sails On (1983) – Ricotin
- The Wind in the Willows (1983) – Reggie (voice)
- Thirteen at Dinner (1985) – Captain Hastings
- Dead Man's Folly (1986) – Captain Hastings
- Murder in Three Acts (1986) – Captain Hastings
- The Second Victory (1987) – Capt. Lowell
- Little Dorrit (1987) – Magnate on the Bench
- Hot Paint (1988) – Earl of Lanscombe
- The Fool (1990) – Sir Martin Locket
- A Fine Romance (1992)
- As You Like It (1992) – Lord
- Late Flowering Lust (1994) – Mr. Fairclough
- Day Release (1997)
- RPM (1998) – Lord Baxter
- Fakers (2004) – Dr Fielding
- Van Wilder: The Rise of Taj (2006) – Provost Cunningham
