= Thirteen at Dinner (film) =

Television mystery film

- Genre: Crime; Mystery; Thriller
- Based on: Lord Edgware Dies by Agatha Christie
- Written by: Rod Browning
- Directed by: Lou Antonio
- Starring: Peter Ustinov; Faye Dunaway; David Suchet; Jonathan Cecil; Bill Nighy; Diane Keen; John Stride; Benedict Taylor; Lee Horsley
- Music by: John Addison
- Countries of origin: United Kingdom; United States
- Original language: English

Production
- Producer: Neil Hartley
- Production locations: London; Royal College of Music, Prince Consort Road, South Kensington, London, England; Shad Thames, Southwark, London, England
- Cinematography: Curtis Clark
- Editor: David A. Simmons
- Running time: 87 minutes
- Production companies: CBS Entertainment Productions; Warner Bros. Television

Original release
- Network: CBS
- Release: October 19, 1985

Related
- Evil Under the Sun; Dead Man's Folly

Thirteen at Dinner is a 1985 British-American made-for-television mystery film featuring the Belgian detective Hercule Poirot. Adapted by Rod Browning from the 1933 Agatha Christie novel Lord Edgware Dies, it was directed by Lou Antonio and starred Peter Ustinov, Faye Dunaway, Jonathan Cecil, Diane Keen, Bill Nighy and David Suchet, who was later to play Poirot in the long-running television series entitled Agatha Christie's Poirot. The film first aired on CBS Television on October 18, 1985.

== Synopsis ==
Hercule Poirot appears on David Frost's talk show with actor Bryan Martin. The two are joined by Martin's costar Jane Wilkinson, who is later revealed to be a Wilkinson impersonator named Carlotta Adams. Adams' impression of Wilkinson is so perfect it fools Martin himself. Martin, Poirot, and Poirot's assistant Captain Arthur Hastings attend a dinner party, where the real Jane Wilkinson corners Poirot and asks for his help getting her a divorce from her husband, Lord George Edgeware. Poirot agrees, only to discover that Lord Edgeware has already granted the divorce.

The next day, Lord Edgware is found dead. His staff insist that Wilkinson must have killed him, since she had threatened to once before. Inspector James Japp is ready to arrest Wilkinson for the crime, but she has an alibi: she was at a dinner party with 12 other people. After Carlotta Adams is also murdered, Poirot investigates, much to Japp's annoyance. In the end, it is revealed that Jane Wilkinson did in fact murder Lord Edgeware, hiring Adams to attend the dinner party in her stead in order to give herself an alibi. She then killed Adams to ensure her silence.

== Cast ==
- Peter Ustinov as Hercule Poirot
- Faye Dunaway as Jane Wilkinson / Carlotta Adams
- Jonathan Cecil as Arthur Hastings
- Bill Nighy as Ronald Marsh
- Diane Keen as Jenny Driver
- David Suchet as Inspector James Japp
- John Stride as Film Director
- Benedict Taylor as Donald Ross
- Lee Horsley as Bryan Martin
- Allan Cuthbertson as Sir Montague Corner
- John Barron as Lord George Edgware
- Lesley Dunlop as Alice Bennett
- Avril Elgar as Miss Carroll
- Amanda Pays as Geraldine Marsh
- John Quarmby as Sir Montague's Butler
- Pamela Salem as Mrs. Wildburn
- Lou Antonio as Movie Producer
- David Frost as Himself
- Tony Hawks as Man in Background at party
- Sue Lloyd as Woman speaking in Background at a meeting (uncredited)

== Production ==
Thirteen At Dinner was the first of three television films featuring Sir Peter Ustinov as Hercule Poirot. All three were given contemporary settings, rather than being set in the era in which they were originally written. Ustinov had appeared as Poirot in two previous theatrical films Death on the Nile (1978) and Evil Under the Sun (1982) after taking over the role from Albert Finney.
