= Arthur Hastings =

Close friend of Hercule Poirot

- Hugh Fraser as Hastings
- First appearance: The Mysterious Affair at Styles (1920)
- Last appearance: Curtain (1975)
- Created by: Agatha Christie
- Portrayed by: Richard Cooper; Robert Morley; Jonathan Cecil; Dmitry Krylov; Hugh Fraser; Jeremy Clyde; Simon Williams; Himesh Patel

In-universe information
- Occupation: Army Captain (ex), secretary, rancher
- Spouses: Dulcie Duveen (1923–unknown; her death)
- Children: Two unnamed sons Grace; Judith
- Relatives: A sister Two grandsons
- Nationality: (United Kingdom) British
- Birth date and place: 1886; United Kingdom

Captain Arthur J. M. Hastings, OBE, is a fictional character created by Agatha Christie as the companion-chronicler and best friend of the Belgian detective Hercule Poirot. He is first introduced in Christie's 1920 novel The Mysterious Affair at Styles (originally written in 1916) and appears as a character in seven other Poirot novels, including the final one Curtain: Poirot's Last Case (1975), along with a play and many short stories. He is also the narrator of several of them.

== Biography ==
The reader is able to pinpoint Hastings's approximate birthdate as 1886 from the first chapter of The Mysterious Affair at Styles (set in 1916), as he mentions that John Cavendish was 'a good fifteen years [his] senior' though hardly looking 'his forty-five years'. He was educated at Eton.

Prior to his service in World War I, Hastings was employed at Lloyd's of London.

Hastings meets Poirot in Belgium during the war several years before their meeting on 16 July 1916, at Styles Court, Essex, in the first of Christie's novels. Hastings was a Captain.

Hastings married Dulcie Duveen sometime after the events of 1923's The Murder on the Links. The couple moved to Argentina, where they ranched. They had several children, two sons and two daughters. One son joined the Navy, the other married and took over the running of the ranch. Grace married a soldier who during the events of Curtain was stationed in India. Judith was the child he "secretly..always loved best, though [he] had never for one moment understood"; she attended university and worked for a research scientist. Hastings returned to England on several occasions for business purposes.

By the 1930s, Hastings wore a moustache.

By the events of Curtain, Hastings has been widowed.

== Portrayals ==
Hastings has been portrayed on film and television by several actors, Richard Cooper in Black Coffee (1931) and Lord Edgware Dies (1934); Robert Morley in The Alphabet Murders (1965); Jonathan Cecil in three TV films – Thirteen at Dinner (1985), Dead Man's Folly (1986) and Murder in Three Acts (1986); Dmitry Krylov in the Soviet film Mystery Endhauz (1989, directed by Vadim Derbenyov); and Hugh Fraser, who portrayed Hastings alongside David Suchet's Poirot in 43 of the 70 episodes of Agatha Christie's Poirot. He is also a main character in the anime Agatha Christie's Great Detectives Poirot and Marple.

In the BBC Radio 4 dramatisations starring John Moffatt as Hercule Poirot, Captain Hastings was played by Jeremy Clyde in Murder on the Links (1990), and by Simon Williams in Lord Edgware Dies (1992), The ABC Murders (2000), Peril at End House (2000), The Mysterious Affair at Styles (2005), and Dumb Witness (2006).

Himesh Patel voiced Hastings in Audible's adaptation of The Mysterious Affair at Styles and The ABC Murders.

== The Hastings novels ==
Hastings narrates the majority of the short stories featuring Poirot, but appears in only eight of the novels, seven of which were written before 1940:

- The Mysterious Affair at Styles (1916 but published in 1920)
- The Murder on the Links (1923)
- The Big Four (1927)
- Peril at End House (1932)
- Lord Edgware Dies (1933) – published in the U.S. as Thirteen at Dinner
- The A.B.C. Murders (1936)
- Dumb Witness (1937) – published in the U.S. as Poirot Loses a Client
- Curtain: Poirot's Last Case (written in the early 1940s, published in 1975)

Hastings is the narrator of all stories in Poirot Investigates (1924), a collection of short stories. Hastings is also present in Christie's play Black Coffee (1930) and its novelisation alongside Poirot.

== See also ==
- Ariadne Oliver
