= Ustinova =

Ustinova is a Russian surname (the feminine form of Ustinov) that can refer to the following:

- Anna Ustinova (high jumper), Kazakh high jumper
- Anna Ustinova, Russian mountain bike orienteer
- Daria Ustinova, Russian backstroke swimmer
- Natalya Ustinova, Uzbek former swimmer
- Svetlana Ustinova, Russian actress
- Tatyana Ustinova, Soviet geologist
