= Baap Re Baap =

Baap Re Baap (transl. Dear Me) may refer to these Indian films:

- Baap Re Baap (1955 film), Hindi-language film directed by A. R. Kardar
- Baap Re Baap (2019 film), Gujarati-language directed by Sagar Kalaria

== See also ==
- Dear Me (disambiguation)
