= Dmitry Krylov =

Russian journalist (born 1946)

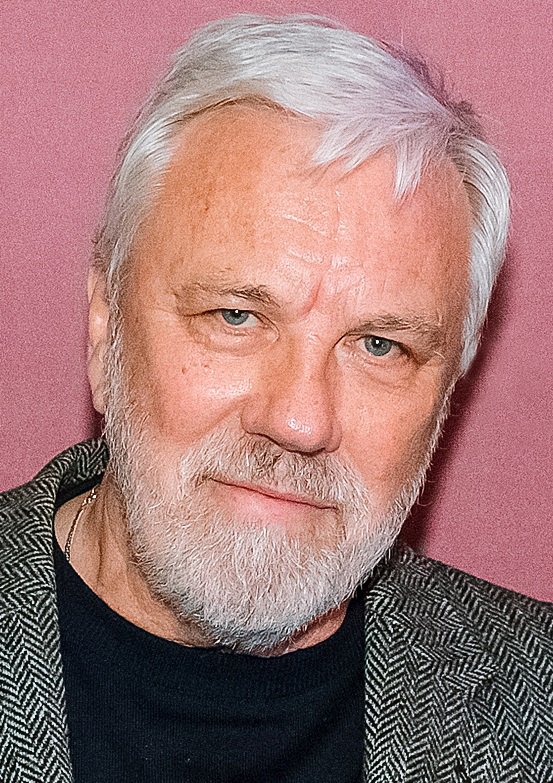
- Born: 29 September 1946 (age 79); Russian Far East, Sea of Okhotsk, Soviet Union
- Occupations: Journalist, actor
- Years active: 1970–present

Dmitry Dmitrievich Krylov (Russian: Дмитрий Дмитриевич Крылов, born 29 September 1946, the Sea of Okhotsk) is a Soviet and Russian television journalist, actor, author and presenter of the TV program Mischievous notes (1996) and Telescope (Sputnik viewer). Head Workshop journalism faculty of Moscow Institute of Television and Radio Broadcasting Ostankino.

Since June 1998 Member of the Presidium of the National Guild of tourism press.

== Personal life ==
His wife Tatiana Barinova is an editor and correspondent. He has a son, Dmitry (born 1980), an operator, and from his third marriage, another son, Dmitry Krylov (born 1987).

== Filmography ==
Year	Media	Role
1989	Mystery Endhauz	Arthur Hastings
1991	How to live, carp?	Himself
1991	Moscow Beauty	Host
1992	Forgiveness	Arkady Markovich
2008	Big Difference	Himself
