= Peter Ustinov =

British actor and humanitarian (1921–2004)

Sir Peter Ustinov CBE FRSA
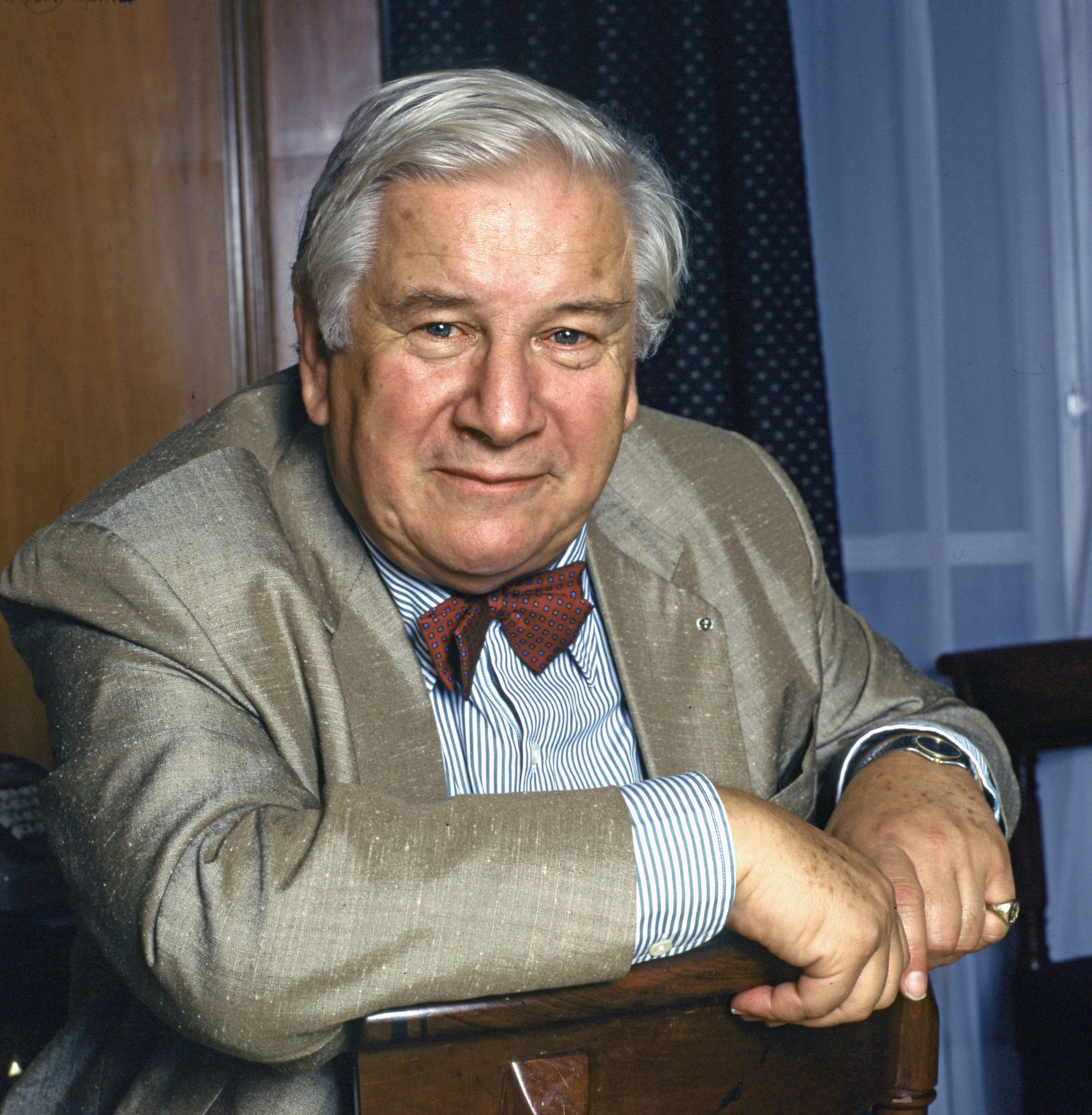
- Ustinov in 1986

Chancellor of Durham University
- In office 7 May 1992 – 28 March 2004
- Vice-Chancellor: Evelyn Ebsworth; Kenneth Calman
- Preceded by: Margot Fonteyn
- Succeeded by: Bill Bryson

Personal details
- Born: Peter Alexander Freiherr von Ustinov; 16 April 1921 London, England
- Died: 28 March 2004 (aged 82) Genolier, Switzerland
- Resting place: Bursins Cemetery, Bursins, Switzerland
- Spouses: Isolde Denham (m. 1940; div. 1950); Suzanne Cloutier (m. 1954; div. 1971); Helene du Lau d'Allemans (m. 1972)
- Children: 4, including Tamara
- Parents: Jona von Ustinov; Nadia Benois

Sir Peter Alexander Ustinov (/ˈuːstɪnɒv/ OO-stin-ov; 16 April 1921 – 28 March 2004) was a British actor, writer and humanitarian. An internationally known raconteur, he was a fixture on television talk shows and lecture circuits for much of his career. Ustinov received numerous accolades including two Academy Awards, three Primetime Emmy Awards, a Golden Globe Award, a Silver Bear, a Laurel Award, a Photoplay Award and a Grammy Award, as well as nominations for three BAFTAs, two Tony Awards, two Laurence Olivier Awards and a Gemini Award. In 1992, Ustinov was awarded with the British Academy Britannia Award.

Ustinov received two Academy Awards for Best Supporting Actor for his roles in Spartacus (1960), and Topkapi (1964). He also starred in notable films such as Quo Vadis (1951), The Sundowners (1960), Billy Budd (1962), and Hot Millions (1968). He voiced Prince John and King Richard in the Walt Disney Animated film Robin Hood (1973), and portrayed Agatha Christie's fictional detective Hercule Poirot six times for both film and television.

Ustinov also displayed a unique cultural versatility which frequently earned him the accolade of a Renaissance man. Miklós Rózsa, composer of the music for Quo Vadis and of numerous concert works, dedicated his String Quartet No. 1, Op. 22 (1950) to Ustinov.

An intellectual and diplomat, Ustinov held various academic posts, and served as a goodwill ambassador for UNICEF and president of the World Federalist Movement (WFM). In 2003, Durham University changed the name of its Graduate Society to Ustinov College, in honour of the significant contributions Ustinov had made as chancellor of the university from 1992 until his death.

== Early life and education ==
Peter Alexander Freiherr von Ustinov was born on 16 April 1921 at 45 Belsize Park, London. His father, Jona Freiherr von Ustinov, was of Russian, German, Polish, Ethiopian, and Jewish descent. Ustinov's paternal grandfather was Baron Plato von Ustinov, a Russian nobleman, and his grandmother was Magdalena Hall, of mixed German-Ethiopian-Jewish origin. Ustinov's great-grandfather Moritz Hall, a Jewish refugee from Kraków and later a Christian convert and colleague of Swiss and German missionaries in Ethiopia, married into a German-Ethiopian family. Ustinov's paternal great-great-grandparents (through Magdalena's mother) were the German painter Eduard Zander and the Ethiopian aristocrat Court-Lady Isette-Werq of Gondar.

Ustinov's mother, Nadezhda Leontievna Benois, known as Nadia, was a painter and ballet designer of French, German, Italian, and Russian descent. Her father, Leon Benois, was an Imperial Russian architect and owner of Leonardo da Vinci's painting The Benois Madonna. Leon's brother Alexandre Benois was a stage designer who worked with Stravinsky and Diaghilev. Their paternal ancestor Jules-César Benois was a chef who had left France for Saint Petersburg during the French Revolution and became a chef to Emperor Paul I of Russia.

Jona (or Iona) worked as a press officer at the German embassy in London in the 1930s and was a reporter for a German news agency. In 1935, two years after Adolf Hitler came to power in Germany, Jona von Ustinov began working for the British intelligence service MI5 and became a British subject, thus avoiding internment during the war. Ustinov claimed that the statutory notice of his application for citizenship was published in a Welsh newspaper so as not to alert the Germans; notice of "Iona von Ustinow"'s intention to apply for naturalisation was published in a London newspaper in July 1935 and his naturalisation gazetted in December. He was the controller of Wolfgang Gans zu Putlitz, an MI5 spy in the German embassy in London, who furnished information on Hitler's intentions before the Second World War. (Peter Wright mentions in his book Spycatcher that Jona was possibly the spy known as U35; Ustinov says in his autobiography that his father hosted secret meetings of senior British and German officials at their London home.)

Ustinov was educated at Westminster School and had a difficult childhood because of his parents' constant fighting. While at school, Ustinov considered anglicising his name to Peter Austin, but was counselled against it by a fellow pupil who said that he should "Drop the 'von' but keep the 'Ustinov'". In his late teens he trained as an actor at the London Theatre Studio. While there, on 18 July 1938 he made his first appearance on the stage at the Barn Theatre, Shere, playing Waffles in Chekhov's The Wood Demon, and his London stage début later that year at the Players' Theatre, becoming quickly established. He later wrote, "I was not irresistibly drawn to the drama. It was an escape road from the dismal rat race of school".

== Career ==
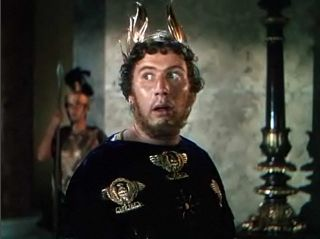
Ustinov as Nero in Quo Vadis (1951)

Ustinov appeared in White Cargo at the Aylesbury Rep in 1939, where he performed in a different accent every night. He served as a private in the British Army during the Second World War, including time spent as batman to David Niven while writing the Niven film The Way Ahead. The difference in their ranks‍—‌Niven was a lieutenant-colonel and Ustinov a private‍—‌made their regular association militarily impossible; to solve the problem, Ustinov was appointed as Niven's batman. He also appeared in propaganda films, debuting in One of Our Aircraft Is Missing (1942), in which he was required to deliver lines in English, Latin and Dutch. In 1944, under the auspices of Entertainments National Service Association, he presented and performed the role of Sir Anthony Absolute, in Sheridan's The Rivals, with Dame Edith Evans, at the theatre in Larkhill Camp, Wiltshire, England.

After the war, he began writing; his first major success was with the play The Love of Four Colonels (1951). He starred with Humphrey Bogart and Aldo Ray in We're No Angels (1955). His career as a dramatist continued, one of his successful plays being Romanoff and Juliet (1956). His film roles include Roman emperor Nero in Quo Vadis (1951), Lentulus Batiatus in Spartacus (1960), Captain Blackbeard in the Disney film Blackbeard's Ghost (1968), and an old man surviving a totalitarian future in Logan's Run (1976). Ustinov voiced the anthropomorphic lions Prince John and King Richard in the 1973 Disney animated film Robin Hood. He also worked on several films as writer and occasionally director, including The Way Ahead (1944), School for Secrets (1946), Hot Millions (1968), and Memed, My Hawk (1984).

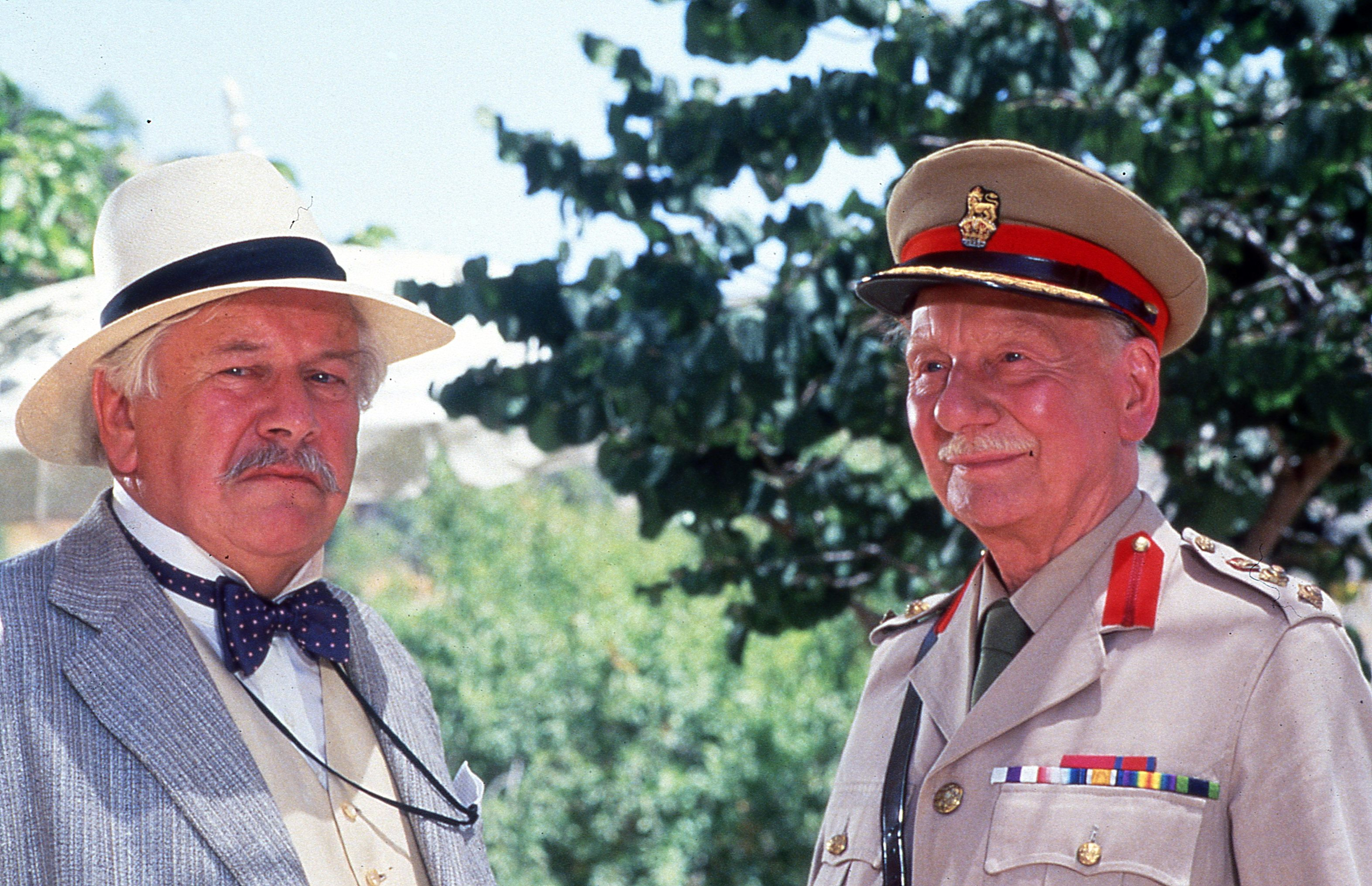
Ustinov (left) as Hercule Poirot with John Gielgud in Appointment with Death (1988)

Ustinov portrayed Agatha Christie's detective Hercule Poirot in six films, beginning with Death on the Nile (1978) and Evil Under the Sun (1982), followed by the television films Thirteen at Dinner (1985), Dead Man's Folly (1986), and Murder in Three Acts (1986), then the theatrical release Appointment with Death (1988).

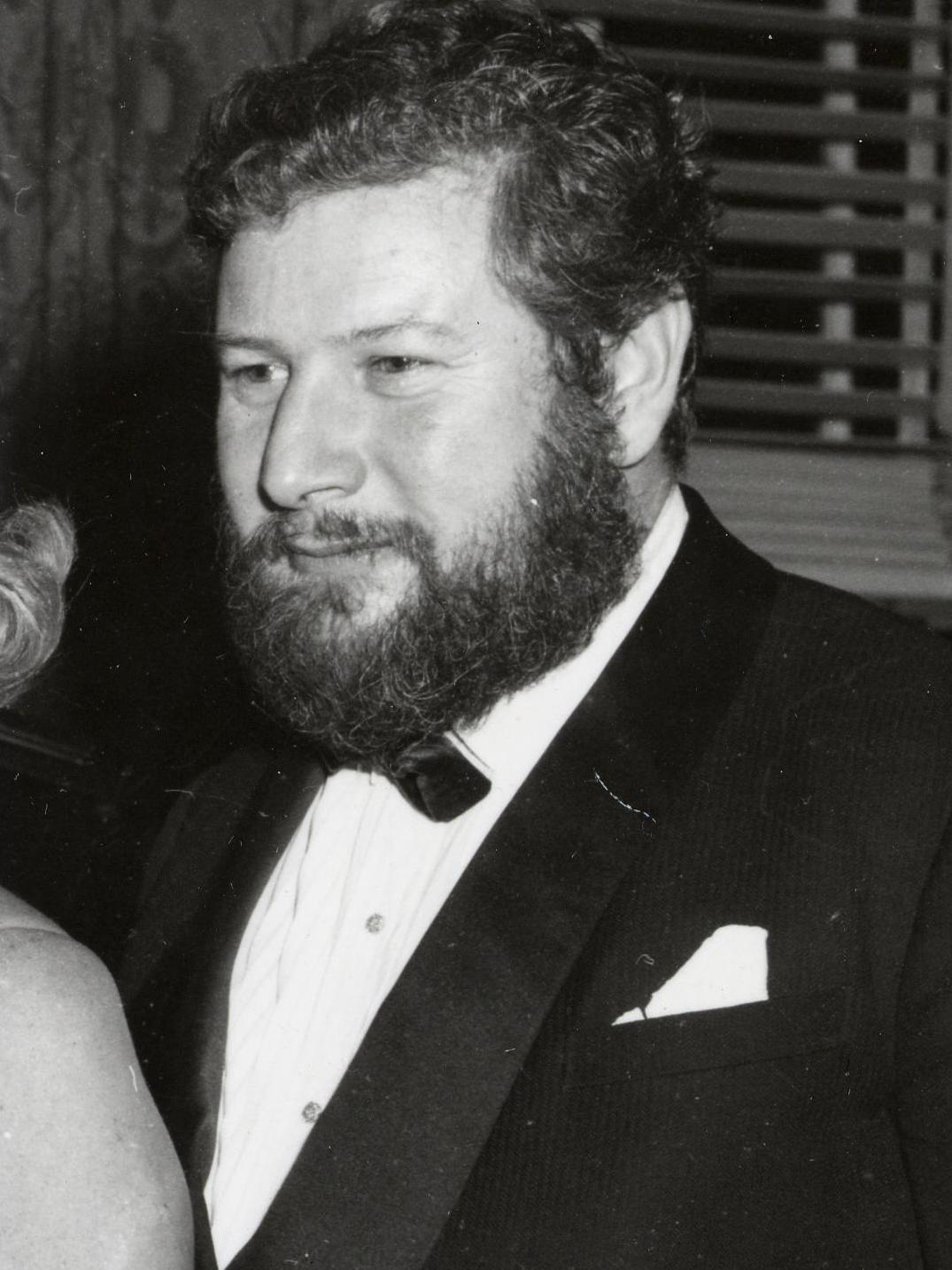
Ustinov c. 1960

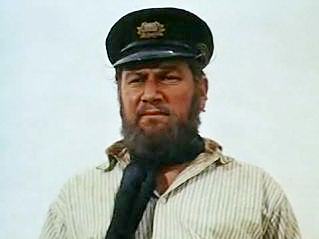
Ustinov in The Sundowners (1960)

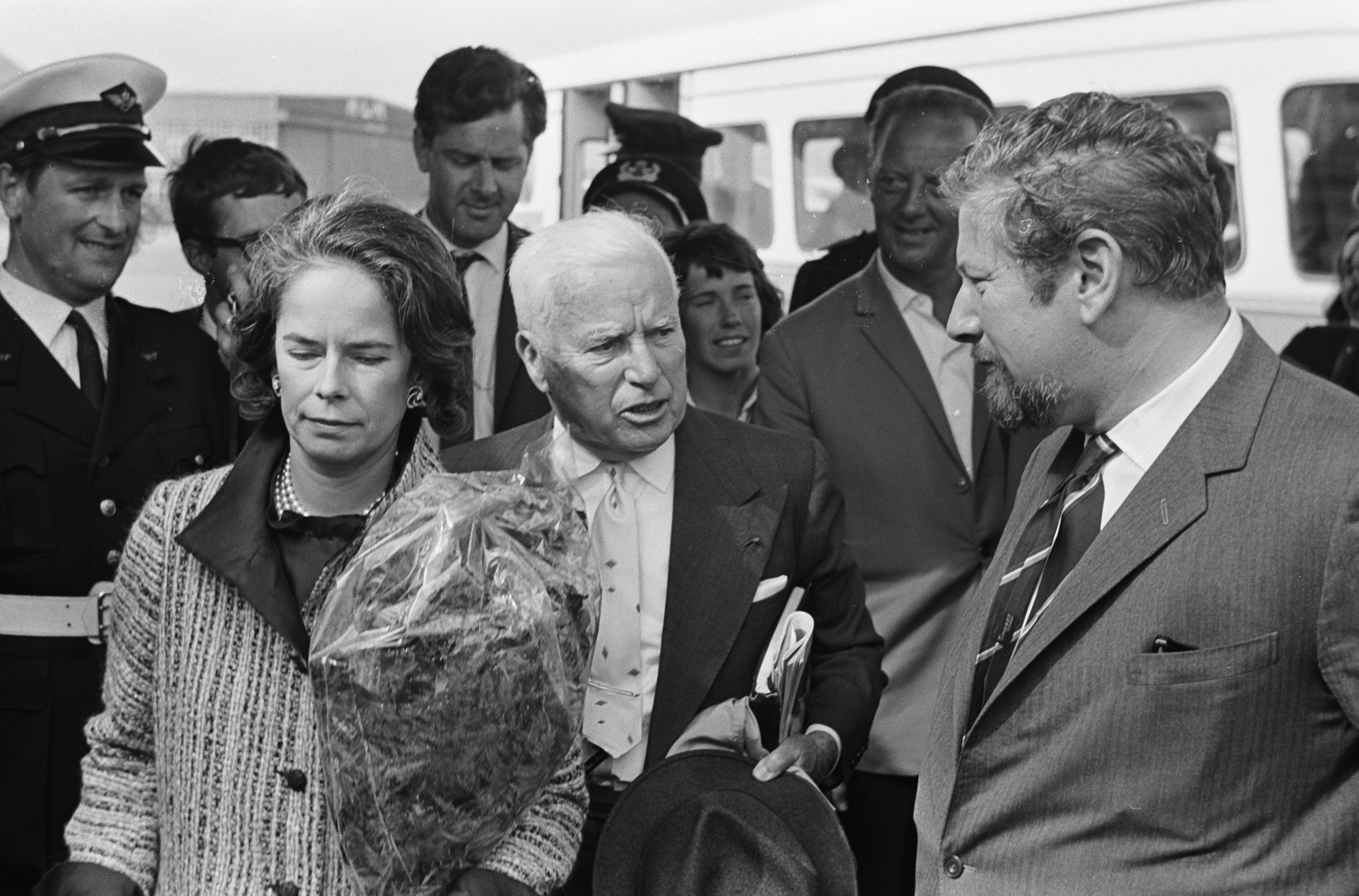
Oona O'Neill, Charles Chaplin, and Ustinov in 1965

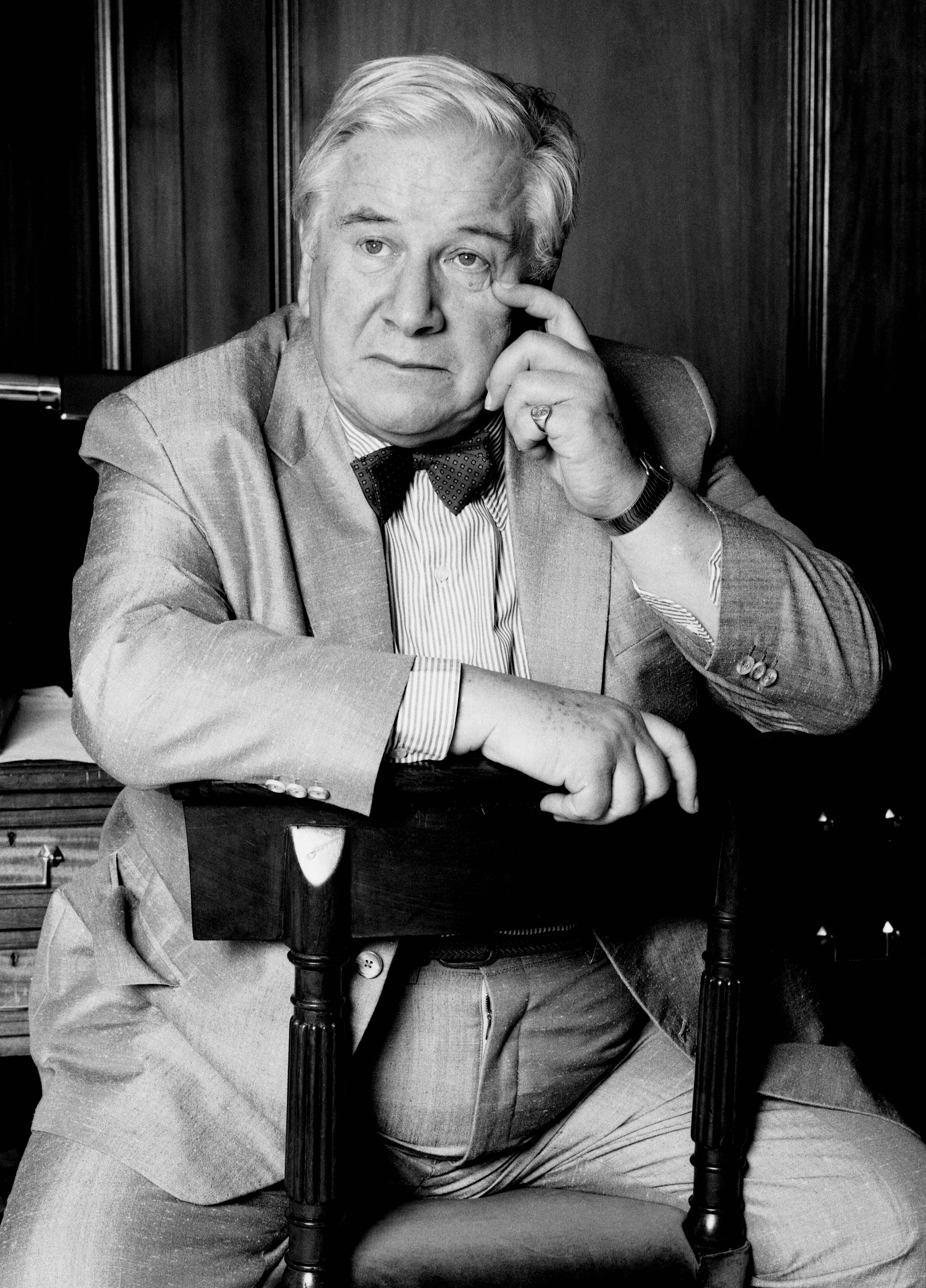
Ustinov in 1986

Ustinov won the Academy Award for Best Supporting Actor twice in his career. The first was for Spartacus, which also earned him the distinction of being the only actor to win an Oscar for a Stanley Kubrick film. He followed this up with his second win four years later for Topkapi. He also won a Golden Globe award for Best Supporting Actor for the film Quo Vadis (he set the Oscar and Globe statuettes up on his desk as if playing doubles tennis; the game was a love of his life, as was ocean yachting). Ustinov was also the winner of three Emmys and one Grammy and was nominated for two Tony Awards.

During the 1960s, with the encouragement of Sir Georg Solti, Ustinov directed several operas, including Puccini's Gianni Schicchi, Ravel's L'heure espagnole, Schoenberg's Erwartung, and Mozart's The Magic Flute. Further demonstrating his great talent and versatility in the theatre, Ustinov later undertook set and costume design for Don Giovanni. In 1962 he adapted Louis O. Coxe and Robert H. Chapman's critically successful Broadway play Billy Budd into a film; penning the screenplay, producing, directing, and starring as Captain Vere. In 1968, he was elected the first rector of the University of Dundee and served two consecutive three-year terms.

His autobiography, Dear Me (1977), was well received and had him describe his life (ostensibly his childhood) while being interrogated by his own ego, with forays into philosophy, theatre, fame, and self-realisation. From 1969 until his death, his acting and writing took second place to his work on behalf of UNICEF, for which he was a goodwill ambassador and fundraiser. In this role, he visited some of the neediest children and made use of his ability to make people laugh, including many of the world's most disadvantaged children. "Sir Peter could make anyone laugh", UNICEF Executive Director Carol Bellamy is quoted as saying. On 31 October 1984, Ustinov was due to interview Prime Minister of India Indira Gandhi for Irish television. She was assassinated on her way to the meeting.

Ustinov served as president of the World Federalist Movement (WFM) from 1991 until his death. He once said, "World government is not only possible, it is inevitable, and when it comes, it will appeal to patriotism in its truest, in its only sense, the patriotism of men who love their national heritages so deeply that they wish to preserve them in safety for the common good".

He was the subject of This Is Your Life on two occasions, in November 1977 when he was surprised by Eamonn Andrews at Pinewood Studios on the set of Death on the Nile. He was surprised again in December 1994, when Michael Aspel approached him at the United Nations headquarters in Geneva. A car enthusiast since the age of four, he owned a succession of interesting machines ranging from a Fiat Topolino, several Lancias, a Hispano-Suiza, a preselector gearbox Delage, and a special-bodied Jowett Jupiter. He made records like Phoney Folklore that included the song of the Russian peasant "whose tractor had betrayed him" and his "Grand Prix of Gibraltar" was a vehicle for his creative wit and ability at car-engine sound effects and voices.

He spoke English, French, Spanish, Italian, German and Russian fluently, as well as some Turkish and modern Greek. He was proficient in accents and dialects in all his languages. Ustinov provided his own German and French dubbing for some of his roles, both of them for Lorenzo's Oil. As Hercule Poirot, he provided his own voice for the French versions of Thirteen at Dinner, Dead Man's Folly, Murder in Three Acts, Appointment with Death, and Evil under the Sun, but unlike Jane Birkin, who had dubbed herself in French for this film and Death on the Nile, Ustinov did not provide his voice for the latter (his French voice being provided by Roger Carel, who had already dubbed him in Spartacus and other films). He dubbed himself in German as Poirot only in Evil under the Sun (his other Poirot roles being undertaken by three actors). However, he provided only his English and German voices for Disney's Robin Hood and NBC's Alice in Wonderland.

In the 1960s, he became a Swiss resident. He was knighted in 1990 and was appointed chancellor of Durham University in 1992, having previously been elected as the first rector of the University of Dundee in 1968 (a role in which he moved from being merely a figurehead to taking on a political role, negotiating with student protesters). Ustinov was re-elected to the post for a second three-year term in 1971, narrowly beating Michael Parkinson after a disputed recount. He received an honorary doctorate from the Vrije Universiteit Brussel.

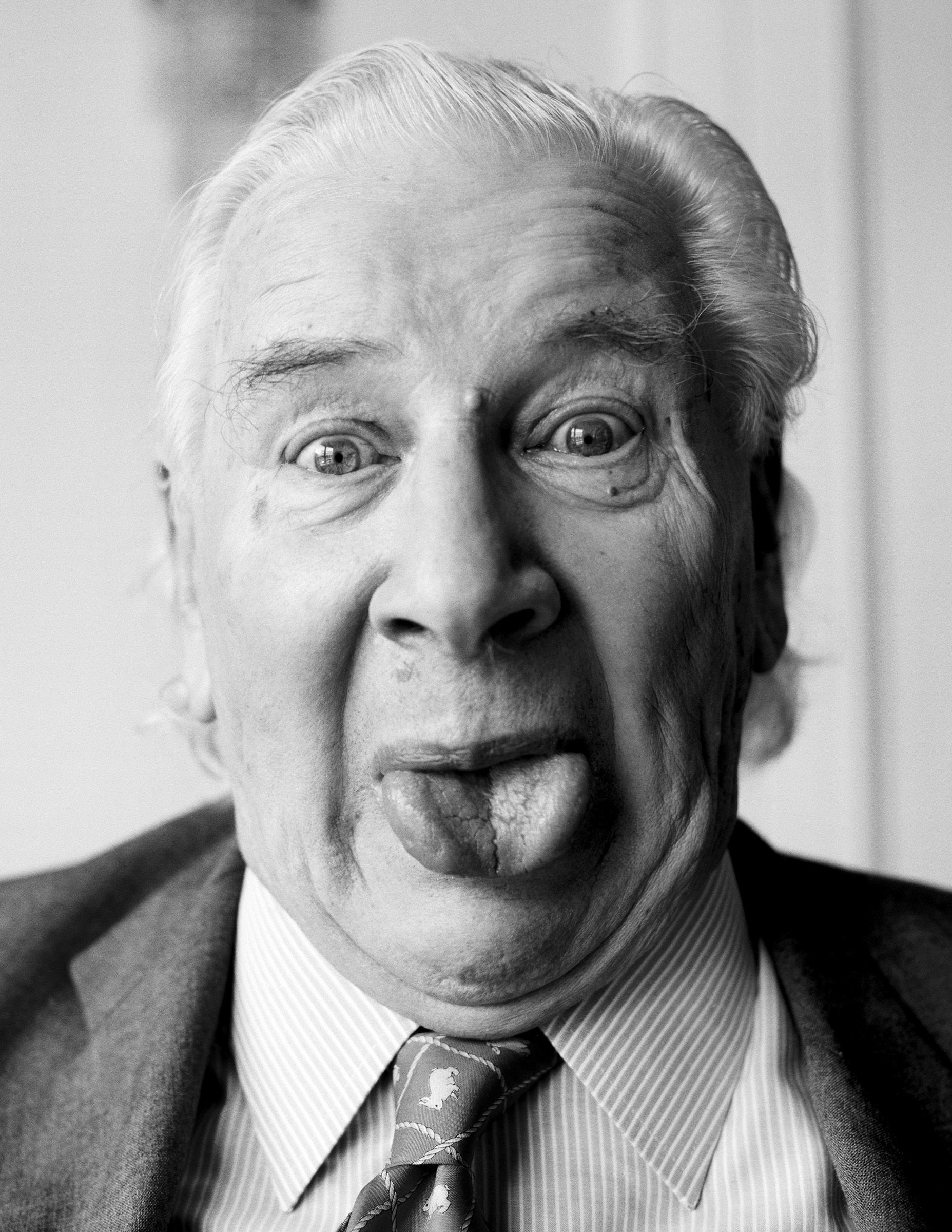
Peter Ustinov photographed by Oliver Mark, Berlin 2003

Ustinov was a frequent defender of the Chinese government, stating in an address to Durham University in 2000, "People are annoyed with the Chinese for not respecting more human rights. But with a population that size it's very difficult to have the same attitude to human rights." In 2003, Durham's postgraduate college (previously known as the Graduate Society) was renamed Ustinov College. Ustinov went to Berlin on a UNICEF mission in 2002 to visit the circle of United Buddy Bears that promote a more peaceful world between nations, cultures, and religions for the first time. He was determined to ensure that Iraq would also be represented in this circle of about 140 countries. Ustinov also presented and narrated the official video review of the 1987 Formula One season and narrated the documentary series Wings of the Red Star. In 1988, he hosted a live television broadcast entitled The Secret Identity of Jack the Ripper. Ustinov gave his name to the Foundation of the International Academy of Television Arts and Sciences for their Sir Peter Ustinov Television Scriptwriting Award, given annually to a young television screenwriter.

== Personal life ==
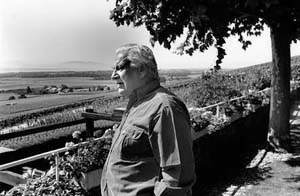
Ustinov in 1992 by Erling Mandelmann

Ustinov was married three times—first to Isolde Denham (1920–1987), daughter of Reginald Denham and Moyna Macgill. The marriage lasted from 1940 to their divorce in 1950, and they had one child, daughter Tamara Ustinov. Isolde was the half-sister of Angela Lansbury, who appeared with Ustinov in Death on the Nile.

His second marriage was to Suzanne Cloutier, which lasted from 1954 to their divorce in 1971. They had three children: two daughters, Pavla Ustinov and Andrea Ustinov, and a son, Igor Ustinov. Both Pavla and Andrea are actresses; Pavla appeared with her father in The Thief of Baghdad.

His third marriage was to Helene du Lau d'Allemans, which lasted from 1972 to his death in 2004.

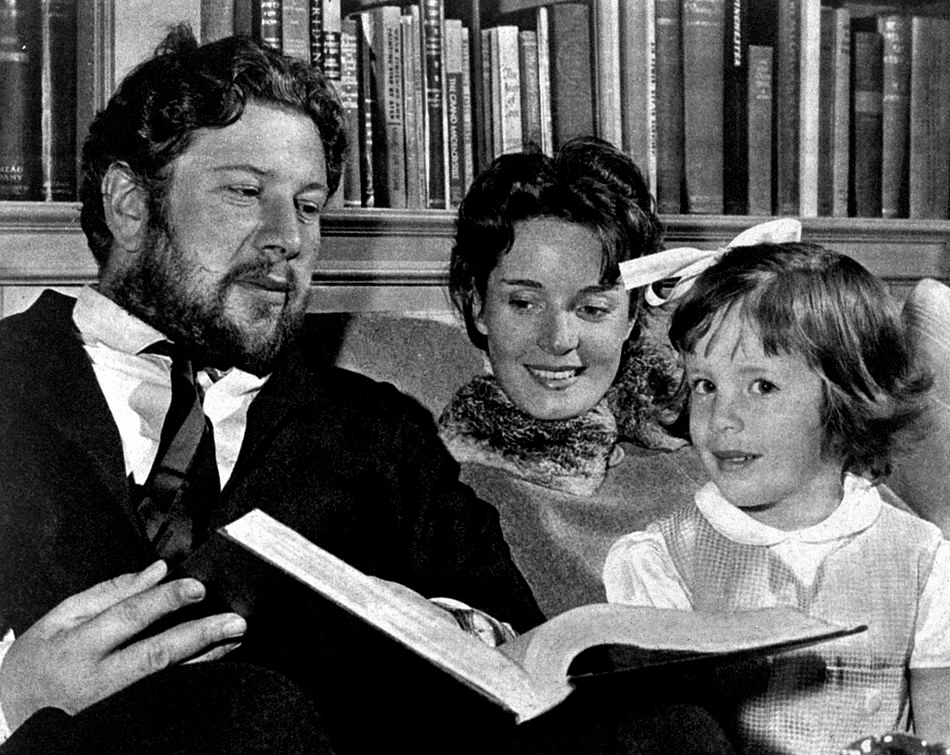
Ustinov with Suzanne Cloutier and daughter in the 1950s

Ustinov was a secular humanist. He was listed as a distinguished supporter of the British Humanist Association, and had once served on its advisory council.

Ustinov spent his summer holidays in Mallorca for decades. He suffered from diabetes and a weakened heart in his last years.

In 1999, Peter and his son Igor Ustinov founded the Sir Peter Ustinov Stiftung (Sir Peter Ustinov Foundation) in the city of Munich in Germany. The foundation is now based in Frankfurt am Main.

== Death ==
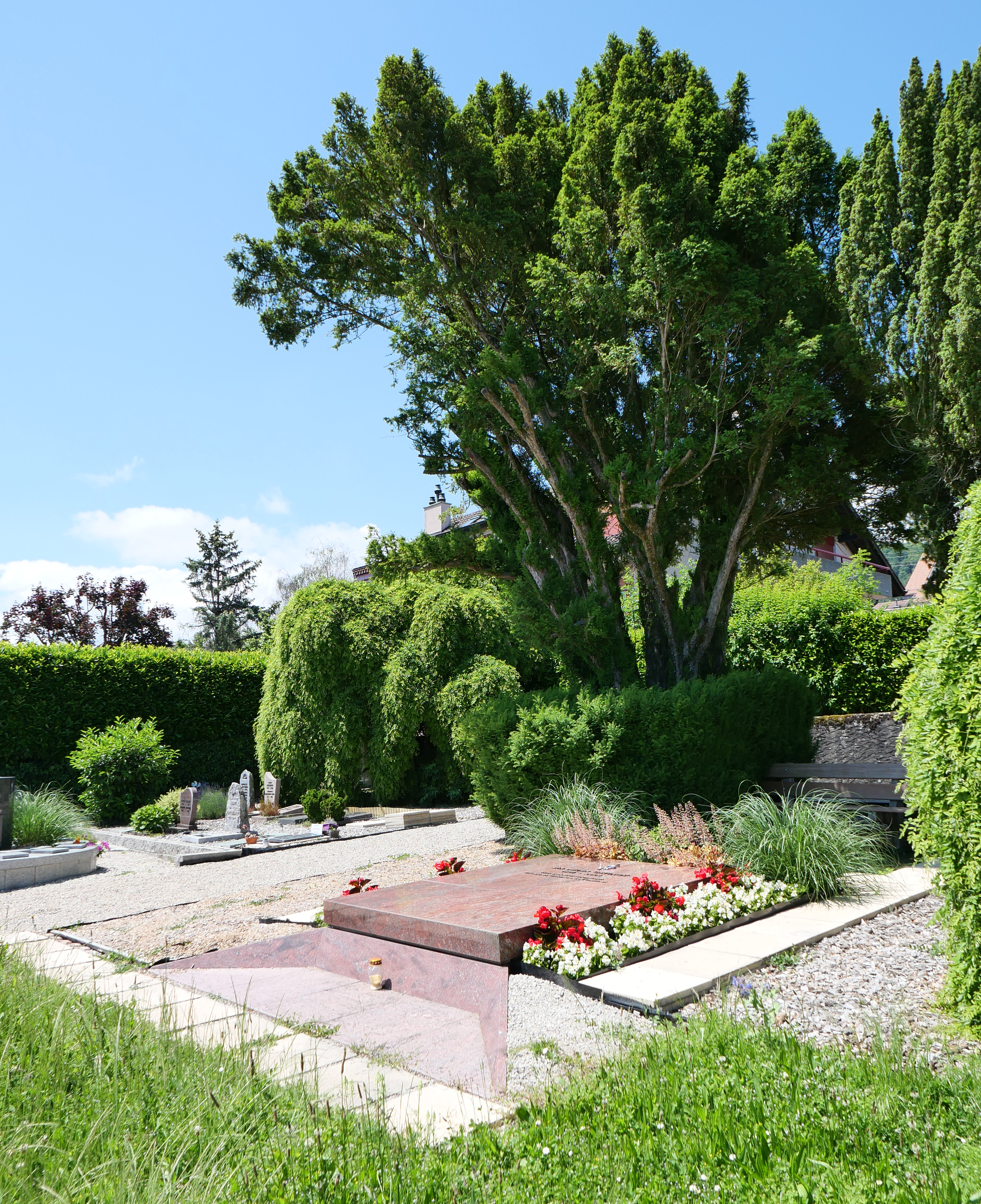
Ustinov's grave in 2024

Ustinov died on 28 March 2004 of heart failure in a clinic in Genolier, near his home in Bursins, Switzerland, aged 82. He had suffered from diabetes and heart disease.

Ustinov found his final resting place at the cemetery of Bursins. His ledger stone bears a cross, despite his self-description as a secular humanist, and the inscription:

SIR PETER USTINOV

1921-2004

Writer-Actor-Humanist

Musicien-Membre de l'Institut

== Globalism ==
Ustinov was the president of the World Federalist Movement (WFM) from 1991 to 2004, the time of his death.

Until his death, Ustinov was a member of English PEN, part of the PEN International network that campaigns for freedom of expression.

== Filmography ==
=== Films ===
Year	Film	Role	Director	Notes
1940	Hullo Fame		Andrew Buchanan	
1940	Mein Kampf — My Crimes	Marinus van der Lubbe	Norman Lee	Uncredited
1942	One of Our Aircraft Is Missing	The Priest	Michael Powell and Emeric Pressburger	
1942	The Goose Steps Out	Krauss	Basil Dearden	
1942	Let the People Sing	Dr. Bentika	John Baxter	
1943	The New Lot	Keith	Carol Reed	Uncredited
1944	The Way Ahead	Rispoli – Cafe Owner	Carol Reed	
1945	The True Glory	Commentator	Carol Reed	Documentary
1946	School for Secrets	N/A	Peter Ustinov	
1946	Carnival	N/A	Stanley Haynes	
1948	Vice Versa	N/A	Peter Ustinov	
1949	Private Angelo	Private Angelo	Peter Ustinov	
1950	Odette	Lt. Alex Rabinovich / Arnauld	Herbert Wilcox	
1951	Hotel Sahara	Emad	Ken Annakin	
1951	Quo Vadis	Nero	Mervyn LeRoy	
1951	The Magic Box	Industry Man	John Boulting	
1952	Le Plaisir	Narrator	Max Ophuls	English version; Voice; Uncredited
1952	The Curious Adventures of Mr. Wonderbird	Wonderbird	Paul Grimault	English version; Voice
1953	Martin Luther	Duke Francis of Luneberg	Irving Pichel	Uncredited
1954	The Egyptian	Kaptah	Michael Curtiz	
1954	Beau Brummell	Prince of Wales	Curtis Bernhardt	
1955	We're No Angels	Jules	Michael Curtiz	
1955	Lola Montès	Circus Master	Max Ophüls	
1956	The Wanderers	Don Alfonso Pugliesi	Hugo Fregonese	
1957	The Spies	Michel Kiminsky	Henri-Georges Clouzot	
1957	The Man Who Wagged His Tail	Mr. Bossi	Ladislao Vajda	
1960	Spartacus	Batiatus	Stanley Kubrick	
1960	The Sundowners	Rupert Venneker	Fred Zinnemann	
1961	Romanoff and Juliet	The General	Peter Ustinov	
1962	Billy Budd	Edwin Fairfax Vere	Peter Ustinov	
1963	The Human Dutch	Narrator	Bert Haanstra	Voice, English-language version only
1963	Women of the World	Narrator	Franco Prosperi	Voice
1964	Topkapi	Arthur Simon Simpson	Jules Dassin	
1964	The Peaches	Narrator	Michael Gill	Voice
1965	John Goldfarb, Please Come Home!	King Fawz	J. Lee Thompson	
1965	Lady L	Prince Otto of Bavaria	Peter Ustinov	Uncredited
1967	The Comedians	Amb. Manuel Pineda	Peter Glenville	
1968	Blackbeard's Ghost	Captain Blackbeard	Robert Stevenson	
1968	Hot Millions	Marcus Pendleton / Caesar Smith	Eric Till	
1969	Viva Max!	General Max	Jerry Paris	
1970	The Festival Game	Himself	Tony Klinger and Michael Lytton	
1972	Hammersmith Is Out	Doctor	Peter Ustinov	
1972	Big Truck and Sister Clare	Israeli Truck Driver	Robert Ellis Miller	
1973	Robin Hood	Prince John; King Richard	Wolfgang Reitherman	Voice
1975	One of Our Dinosaurs Is Missing	Hnup Wan	Robert Stevenson	
1976	Logan's Run	Old Man	Michael Anderson	
1976	Treasure of Matecumbe	Dr. Ewing T. Snodgrass	Vincent McEveety	
1977	The Purple Taxi	Taubelman	Yves Boisset	
1977	The Mouse and His Child	Manny the Rat	Charles Swenson; Fred Wolf	Voice
1977	Double Murder	Harry Hellman	Steno	
1977	The Last Remake of Beau Geste	Sgt. Markov	Marty Feldman	
1978	Winds of Change	Narrator	Takashi Masunaga	Voice
1978	Death on the Nile	Hercule Poirot	John Guillermin	
1978	Thief of Baghdad	The Caliph	Clive Donner	
1979	Morte no Tejo	himself	Luís Galvão Teles	
1979	Ashanti	Suleiman	Richard Fleischer	
1979	We'll Grow Thin Together	Victor Lasnier	Michel Vocoret	
1979	Tarka the Otter	Narrator	David Cobham	Voice
1981	Charlie Chan and the Curse of the Dragon Queen	Charlie Chan	Clive Donner	
1981	The Great Muppet Caper	Truck Driver	Jim Henson	
1981	Grendel Grendel Grendel	Grendel	Alexander Stitt	Voice
1981	The Search for Santa Claus	Grandfather	Stan Swan	
1982	Venezia, carnevale – Un amore		Mario Lanfranchi	
1982	Evil Under the Sun	Hercule Poirot	Guy Hamilton	
1984	Memed, My Hawk	Abdi Aga	Peter Ustinov	
1988	Appointment with Death	Hercule Poirot	Michael Winner	
1988	Peep and the Big Wide World	Narrator	Rick Marshall	
1989	La Révolution française	Comte de Mirabeau	Robert Enrico and Richard T. Heffron	Segment: "Les Années Lumière"
1989	Granpa	Granpa (voice)	Dianne Jackson	
1990	There Was a Castle with Forty Dogs	Le vétérinaire Muggione	Duccio Tessari	
1992	Lorenzo's Oil	Professor Nikolais	George Miller	
1993	Glasnost and Glamour	Narrator / Himself	Patrick Lichfield / Unipart	
1995	The Phoenix and the Magic Carpet	Grandfather / Phoenix	Zoran Perisic	Voice
1998	Stiff Upper Lips	Horace	Gary Sinyor	
1999	Animal Farm	Old Major	John Stephenson	Voice
1999	The Bachelor	Grandad James Shannon	Gary Sinyor	
2000	My Khmer Heart	Himself	Janine Hosking	
2000	Majestät brauchen Sonne	Voice	Peter Schamoni	
2001	Stanley Kubrick: A Life in Pictures	Himself	Jan Harlan	
2003	Luther	Frederick the Wise	Eric Till	
2004	Siberia: Railroad Through the Wilderness	Narrator	Frank Mueller	Voice; final film role

=== Television ===
- What's My Line? (1957—1966) – gameshow, 9 episodes
- I've Got a Secret (1960) – gameshow, 1 episode
- Barefoot in Athens (1966) – TV film, as Socrates
- Klapzubova jedenáctka (1968) – TV serial, episode 12: "Muži z Ria", as television commentator
- Parkinson (1971—1972) – talk show, 3 episodes
- Clochemerle (1972) – 9 episodes, as narrator
- The Muppet Show (1976) – 1 episode, as himself
- Kein Abend wie jeder andere (1976) – TV film, as owner of Billy's artstore
- Jesus of Nazareth (1977) – miniseries, as Herod the Great
- Doctor Snuggles (1979) – 13 episodes, as Doctor Snuggles
- Einstein's Universe (1979) – documentary film, as himself
- Nuclear Nightmares (1979) – documentary film, as himself
- Omni: The New Frontier (1981)
- Overheard (1984) – TV film, as Comrade Kuruk
- Thirteen at Dinner (1985) – TV film, as Hercule Poirot
- Dead Man's Folly (1986) – TV film, as Hercule Poirot
- Murder in Three Acts (1986) – TV film, as Hercule Poirot
- Peter Ustinov's Russia: A Personal Journey (1986) – documentary miniseries, as himself
- The World Challenge / Le défi mondial (1986)
- An Audience with Peter Ustinov (1988)
- The Secret Identity of Jack the Ripper (1988) – documentary
- Around the World in 80 Days (1989) – miniseries, as Detective Wilbur Fix
- Peter Ustinov on the Orient Express (1991)
- Wings of the Red Star (1993) – documentary series, 13 episodes, as narrator
- Celebrating Haydn with Peter Ustinov (1994) – documentary
- The Old Curiosity Shop (1995) – TV film, as Grandfather
- Paths of the Gods (1995) – documentary series, 8 episodes, as himself
- Sir Peter Ustinov's Mendelssohn (1997) – documentary
- Alice in Wonderland (1999) – TV film, as Walrus
- Animal Farm (1999) – TV film, as Old Major (voice)
- Victoria & Albert (2001) – TV serial, as King William IV
- Winter Solstice – Hughie McLellan

== Bibliography ==
=== Nonfiction ===
- Apropos: portrait painting OCLC 502028565
- Dear Me
- Generation at Jeopardy: Children in Central and Eastern Europe and the Former Soviet Union

(introduction by Peter Ustinov) (UNICEF) OCLC 1124421105

- Klop and the Ustinov Family (with Nadia Benois Ustinov) 1973 OCLC 835951
- My Russia
- Niven's Hollywood (introduction by Peter Ustinov)
- Quotable Ustinov
- Still at Large
- Ustinov at Eighty
- Ustinov at Large
- Ustinov in Russia
- Ustinov Still at Large
- Ustinov's diplomats OCLC 690371045
- We Were Only Human. OCLC 320395513

=== Fiction ===
- Abelard and Heloise
- Add a Dash of Pity and Other Short Stories
- Beethoven's Tenth
- Blow Your Own Trumpet (1943 play)
- Brewer's Theatre (with Isaacs, et al.)
- The Comedy Collection
- Disinformer: Two Novellas
- Frontiers of the Sea (reprinted as Life is an Operetta and Other Short Stories)
- God and the State Railways
- A Grand Knight Out
- Halfway Up the Tree
- The Indifferent Shepherd
- James Thurber (with James Thurber)
- Krumnagel (novel)
- The Laughter Omnibus
- The Loser (novel)
- The Love of Four Colonels
- The Methuen Book of Theatre Verse (with Jonathan and Moira Field)
- Monsieur Rene
- The Moment of Truth
- No Sign of the Dove (play c. 1952)
- The Old Man and Mr. Smith: A Fable
- Photo Finish
- Romanoff and Juliet
- The 13 Clocks with James Thurber
- The Unicorn in the Garden and Other Fables for Our Time
- The Unknown Soldier and His Wife

== Discography ==
- Mock Mozart / Phoney Folk-Lore (Shellac, 10", 78rpm), Anthony Hopkins, harpsichord; George Martin, producer - Parlophone R.3612 UK (1952)
- Mock Mozart / Phoney Folk-Lore (Vinyl, 7", 45rpm), Anthony Hopkins, harpsichord; George Martin, producer - Parlophone MSP6012 UK (1952)
- Peter and the Wolf (Sergei Prokofiev), narration - Philharmonia Orchestra - Herbert von Karajan, conductor - EMI Classics (12/1956 & 04/1957)
- Grand Prix of Gibraltar (1960) (spoken word comedy)
- The Creatures of Prometheus (Ludwig van Beethoven), a musical narration – RCA Red Seal 74321 82163 2 (2001)
- Der Burger als Edelmann (After Moliere, adapted by Ustinov, incidental music by Richard Strauss), Koch Classics 3-6578-2 (1998)

== Awards and nominations ==
Year	Award	Category	Nominated work	Result	Ref.
1951	Academy Awards	Best Supporting Actor	Quo Vadis	Nominated	
1960	Academy Awards	Best Supporting Actor	Spartacus	Won	
1964	Academy Awards	Best Supporting Actor	Topkapi	Won	
1968	Academy Awards	Best Story and Screenplay – Written Directly for the Screen	Hot Millions	Nominated	
1961	Berlin International Film Festival	Golden Bear	Romanoff and Juliet	Nominated	
1972	Berlin International Film Festival	Golden Bear	Hammersmith Is Out	Nominated	
1972	Berlin International Film Festival	Silver Bear	Hammersmith Is Out	Won	
1992	Britannia Awards			Received	
1962	British Academy Film Awards	Best British Screenplay	Billy Budd	Nominated	
1978	British Academy Film Awards	Best Actor in a Leading Role	Death on the Nile	Nominated	
1995	British Academy Television Awards	Best Light Entertainment Performance	An Evening with Sir Peter Ustinov	Nominated	
1989	CableACE Awards	Informational or Documentary Host	Peter Ustinov in China	Won	
1962	Directors Guild of America Awards	Outstanding Directorial Achievement in Motion Pictures	Billy Budd	Nominated	
1963	Directors Guild of America Awards	Outstanding Directorial Achievement in Motion Pictures	Romanoff and Juliet	Nominated	
1979	Evening Standard British Film Awards	Best Actor	Death on the Nile	Won	
1998	Film Fest Gent	Joseph Plateau Honorary Award	—N/a	Honored	
1986	Gemini Awards	Best Performance by a Host or Interviewer	Peter Ustinov's Russia: A Personal Journey	Nominated	
1984	Giffoni Film Festival	Nocciola d'oro	—N/a	Honored	
1951	Golden Globe Awards	Best Supporting Actor – Motion Picture	Quo Vadis	Won	
1960	Golden Globe Awards	Best Supporting Actor – Motion Picture	Spartacus	Nominated	
1964	Golden Globe Awards	Best Actor in a Motion Picture – Musical or Comedy	Topkapi	Nominated	
1959	Grammy Awards	Best Recording for Children	Peter and the Wolf	Won	
1973	Grammy Awards	Best Recording for Children	The Little Prince	Nominated	
1977	Grammy Awards	Best Recording for Children	Russell Hoban: The Mouse and His Child	Nominated	
1980	Grammy Awards	Best Spoken Word, Documentary or Drama	A Curb in the Sky	Nominated	
1960	Laurel Awards	Top Male Supporting Performance	Spartacus	Nominated	
1964	Laurel Awards	Top Male Supporting Performance	Topkapi	Won	
1983	Laurence Olivier Awards	Comedy of the Year	Beethoven's Teeth	Nominated	
1983	Laurence Olivier Awards	Best Comedy Performance	Beethoven's Teeth	Nominated	
1952	Photoplay Awards	Best Performances of the Month (February)	Quo Vadis	Won	
1958	Primetime Emmy Awards	Actor – Best Single Performance – Lead or Support	Omnibus (Episode: "The Life of Samuel Johnson")	Won	
1967	Primetime Emmy Awards	Outstanding Single Performance by an Actor in a Leading Role in a Drama	Hallmark Hall of Fame (Episode: "Barefoot in Athens")	Won	
1970	Primetime Emmy Awards	Outstanding Single Performance by an Actor in a Leading Role	Hallmark Hall of Fame (Episode: "A Storm in Summer")	Won	
1982	Primetime Emmy Awards	Outstanding Individual Achievement – Informational Programming	Omni: The New Frontier	Nominated	
1985	Primetime Emmy Awards	Outstanding Classical Program in the Performing Arts	The Well-Tempered Bach with Peter Ustinov	Nominated	
1958	Tony Awards	Best Play	Romanoff and Juliet	Nominated	
1958	Tony Awards	Best Leading Actor in a Play	Romanoff and Juliet	Nominated	
1962	Writers Guild of America Awards	Best Written American Drama	Billy Budd	Nominated	
1968	Writers Guild of America Awards	Best Written American Comedy	Hot Millions	Nominated	

=== Honorary accolades ===
- 1992: Britannia Award
- 1993: London Film Critics' Circle Award
- 1994: Bambi
- 1997: German Video Prize of the DIVA Award
- 1998: Bavarian Television Award
- 2001: Golden Camera (Goldene Kamera, Berlin)
- 2002: Planetary Consciousness Award of the Club of Budapest
- 2004: Bavarian Film Award (Bayerischer Filmpreis)
- 2004: Rose d'Or Charity Award with UNICEF (posthumously)

=== Other ===
- 1974: Golden Camera Award for Best Actor for the Exchange of Notes
- 1978: Prix de la Butte for Oh my goodness! Messy memoirs
- 1981: Karl Valentin Order (Munich)
- 1987: Golden Rascal (Goldenes Schlitzohr)
- 1997: Ustinov Studio in Bath named in his honour

== Honours ==
=== State honours and awards ===
- 1957: Benjamin Franklin Medal of the Royal Society of Arts (London)
- 1961: Honorary key to the city of Washington DC (USA)
- 1974: Order of the Smile (Poland)
- 1975: Commander of the Order of the British Empire (CBE) (United Kingdom)
- 1978: UNICEF International Prize for outstanding services
- 1985: Commander of the Ordre des Arts et des Lettres (France)
- 1986: Istiqlal Order (Hashemite Kingdom of Jordan)
- 1987: Order of the Yugoslav Flag
- 1987: Elected to the Académie des Beaux-Arts
- 1990: Gold Medal of the City of Athens
- 1990: Medal of the Hellenic Red Cross
- 1990: Knight Bachelor (United Kingdom)
- 1991: Medal of Charles University in Prague
- 1994: Knight of the National Order of the Southern Cross (Brazil)
- 1994: German Culture Prize (Deutscher Kulturpreis)
- 1995: International UNICEF Prize for Outstanding Services
- 1998: Order of Merit of the Federal Republic of Germany (Bundesverdienstkreuz)
- 2001: Austrian Cross of Honour for Science and Art, 1st class
- 2002: Siemens Life Award (Austria)
- 2004: Hanseatic Bremen Prize for International Understanding (Bremer Hansepreis für Völkerverständigung)

=== Honorary degrees ===
Ustinov received honorary degrees for his work.

Country	State/Province	Date	Academic Institution	Degree
United States	Ohio	1968	Cleveland Institute of Music	Doctor of Music (D.Mus.)
United Kingdom		1969	University of Dundee	Doctor of Laws (LL.D.)
United States	Pennsylvania	1971	La Salle University	Doctor of Laws (LL.D.)
United Kingdom		1972	Lancaster University	Doctor of Letters (D.Litt.)
Canada	Alberta	1981	University of Lethbridge	Doctor of Laws (LL.D.)
Canada	Ontario	1984	University of Toronto	Doctor of Laws (LL.D.)
United States	District of Columbia	1988	Georgetown University	
Canada	Ontario	1991	Carleton University	Doctor of Laws (LL.D.)
United Kingdom		1992	Durham University	Doctor of Humanities
Canada	Ontario	1995	St. Michael's College	
Canada	Ontario	1995	Pontifical Institute of Mediaeval Studies	
Republic of Ireland		1999	National University of Ireland	Doctor of Laws (LL.D.)
Switzerland		2001	International University in Geneva	

== See also ==
- List of British actors
- List of Academy Award winners and nominees from Great Britain
- List of actors with Academy Award nominations
- List of actors with more than one Academy Award nomination in the acting categories
- List of actors with two or more Academy Awards in acting categories

Academic offices
Preceded by Sir Learie Constantine as Rector of the University of St Andrews	Rector of the University of Dundee; 1968–1974	Succeeded by Clement Freud
Preceded by Dame Margot Fonteyn	Chancellor of the University of Durham; 1992–2004	Succeeded by Bill Bryson
