= Dear Me (book) =

1977 autobiography by Peter Ustinov

- First edition
- Author: Peter Ustinov
- Language: English
- Publisher: William Heinemann Ltd
- Publication date: March 3, 1977
- Publication place: United Kingdom
- ISBN: 0434817112
- OCLC: 406974738

Dear Me is an autobiography by Peter Ustinov, published in 1977. The book's title is a play on words, since, in addition to "dear me" being a lament, it refers to the fact that the book is addressed to himself, as a conversation between Ustinov's "all too solid flesh" and "remorseless spirit."

A later edition published in 2011 by Random House, which had acquired the original publisher, William Heinemann Ltd, has been digitised by Google Books.
