= Maksim Ustinov =

Russian footballer

Personal information
- Full name: Maksim Igorevich Ustinov
- Date of birth: 27 September 1987 (age 39)
- Height: 1.71 m (5 ft 7 1/2 in)
- Position: Midfielder

Youth career
- FC Chernomorets Novorossiysk

Senior career*
Years	Team	Apps	(Gls)
2006	FC Lokomotiv-KMV Mineralnye Vody (amateur)		
2006–2007	FK Bokelj		
2007	FC Spartak Gelendzhik (amateur)		
2008	FC Politehnica Chișinău	12	(1)
2008	FC Torpedo-RG Moscow	10	(0)
2009	FC Tekstilshchik Ivanovo	22	(1)
2010	FC SKA Rostov-on-Don	13	(1)
2011–2013	FC Slavyansky Slavyansk-na-Kubani	62	(6)
2013–2014	FC Vityaz Krymsk	35	(4)
2015	FC MITOS Novocherkassk	6	(1)
2015	FC Kolos Tsentralny (amateur)		
2017	FC Kosmos Dinskaya (amateur)		
2018	FC Aromat Otradnaya (amateur)		
2019	FC Kuban Krasnodar (amateur)		
- * Club domestic league appearances and goals

Maksim Igorevich Ustinov (Russian: Максим Игоревич Устинов; born 27 September 1987) is a Russian former professional football player.

== Career ==
He played in the Moldovan National Division for FC Politehnica Chișinău in 2008.

In July 2019, Ustinov joined resurrected FC Kuban Krasnodar.
