= Death on the Nile (1978 film) =

1978 film by John Guillermin

- UK theatrical release poster
- Directed by: John Guillermin
- Screenplay by: Anthony Shaffer
- Based on: Death on the Nile by Agatha Christie
- Produced by: John Brabourne; Richard Goodwin
- Starring: Peter Ustinov; Jane Birkin; Lois Chiles; Bette Davis; Mia Farrow; Jon Finch; Olivia Hussey; I. S. Johar; George Kennedy; Angela Lansbury; Simon MacCorkindale; David Niven; Maggie Smith; Jack Warden
- Cinematography: Jack Cardiff
- Edited by: Malcolm Cooke
- Music by: Nino Rota
- Production companies: Mersham Productions; EMI Films
- Distributed by: EMI Distributors
- Release dates: 29 September 1978 (United States); 23 October 1978 (United Kingdom)
- Running time: 140 minutes
- Country: United Kingdom
- Language: English
- Budget: $7.92–8 million
- Box office: $18 million (Worldwide)

Death on the Nile is a 1978 British mystery film based on Agatha Christie's 1937 novel of the same name, directed by John Guillermin and adapted by Anthony Shaffer. The film features the Belgian detective Hercule Poirot, played by Peter Ustinov for the first time, plus an all-star supporting cast that includes Maggie Smith, Angela Lansbury, Bette Davis, Mia Farrow, Jane Birkin, David Niven, George Kennedy, and Jack Warden. The film is a standalone sequel to the 1974 film Murder on the Orient Express.

It takes place in Egypt in 1937, mostly on a period paddle steamer on the Nile. Various famous Ancient Egyptian sights are featured in the film, such as the Great Pyramids, the Sphinx, and temples at Abu Simbel and Karnak.

Death on the Nile won the Academy Award for Best Costume Design at the 51st Academy Awards.

== Plot ==
Expat heiress Linnet Ridgeway hires her friend Jackie de Bellefort's fiancé, Simon Doyle, as her English estate manager. Linnet and Simon marry following a whirlwind courtship. Honeymooning in Egypt, they are surprised by the jilted Jackie, who is stalking them. To avoid her, the Doyles pretend to take a train to Alexandria, then board the Nile paddle steamer, SS Karnak. Holidaying detective Hercule Poirot learns about the situation.

During an excursion to the Temple of Karnak in the city of Luxor, a falling stone narrowly misses the Doyles. Jackie joins the cruise, ignoring Poirot's advice to stay away. She is a crack shot and carries a pistol. Drunk, she shoots Simon in the leg during dinner. The next morning Linnet is found dead, shot in the head with the letter "J" in blood on the wall. However, Jackie has a solid alibi, as fellow passenger Miss Bowers sedated her with morphia and watched her all night.

Poirot and fellow passenger, lawyer Colonel Race investigate. Unknown to the Doyles, Race is there following Andrew Pennington, Linnet's trustee suspected of embezzlement. Almost every passenger had motives to kill Linnet: her maid Louise Bourget was bitter that her mistress refused her a promised dowry; Pennington, who was trying to hide his embezzlement; kleptomaniac American socialite Marie Van Schuyler wanted Linnet's pearl necklace; Van Schuyler's companion, Miss Bowers, blamed Linnet's father Melhuish for ruining her family; romance novelist Salome Otterbourne was being sued by Linnet for libel; Otterbourne's daughter, Rosalie, wanted to protect her mother; Communist writer Jim Ferguson hated Linnet for her wealth; and Swiss psychiatric doctor Ludwig Bessner faced Linnet exposing his unorthodox treatments.

A bundle is retrieved from the Nile, containing the missing pistol wrapped in Van Schuyler's stole, which has a bullet hole; a red ink-stained handkerchief; and a marble ashtray to weigh down the package. When Linnet's pearl necklace is found to be missing, Van Schuyler denies taking it, when Poirot and Race discover the necklace back on Linnet's dead body, Poirot deduces Van Schuyler returned it.

Bourget is found dead clutching a fragment of a banknote, her throat slit with Bessner's scalpel. Poirot deduces she saw the murderer exiting Linnet's cabin and extorted money for her silence. Salome is about to tell Poirot and Race she saw Louise's murderer when she is shot through the doorway with Pennington's revolver.

Poirot gathers everyone in the saloon and reveals that Simon killed Linnet, with Jackie as the mastermind; they had remained lovers all along. Jackie pretended to shoot Simon, drawing attention to herself and ensuring Simon would be left alone while she was taken to her cabin. After running to Linnet's cabin and shooting her, Simon returned to the saloon and shot himself in the leg, using van Schuyler's stole as a silencer. He threw the gun wrapped in the stole and the supposed blood-stained handkerchief with a marble ashtray into the Nile. He used another handkerchief on his leg. Jackie killed Louise, who was blackmailing Simon because she witnessed him enter Linnet's cabin, then killed Salome, who saw Jackie exiting Louise's cabin. The plan was for Simon to kill Linnet, inherit her money, and marry his old love later.

Realising they are caught, Jackie confesses and embraces Simon. Too late, Poirot realises she has reclaimed her pistol and she fatally shoots Simon then herself.

== Cast ==
- Peter Ustinov as Hercule Poirot
- Jane Birkin as Louise Bourget
- Lois Chiles as Linnet Ridgeway
- Bette Davis as Marie Van Schuyler
- Mia Farrow as Jacqueline de Bellefort
- Jon Finch as Jim Ferguson
- Olivia Hussey as Rosalie Otterbourne
- George Kennedy as Andrew Pennington
- Angela Lansbury as Salome Otterbourne
- Simon MacCorkindale as Simon Doyle
- David Niven as Colonel Race
- Maggie Smith as Miss Bowers
- Jack Warden as Dr. Ludwig Bessner
- Harry Andrews as Barnstaple
- I. S. Johar as Mr. Choudhury, manager of the Karnak
- Sam Wanamaker as Rockford
- Celia Imrie as a maid (uncredited)
- Saeed Jaffrey as a servant on the Karnak (uncredited)
- Reg Lye as Workman (uncredited)

== Production ==
=== Development ===
EMI Films had scored a huge success in 1974 with a film version of Murder on the Orient Express, and wanted a follow-up. The plan was to make Death on the Nile, but the rights could not be obtained, so in July 1975 EMI announced they would film Evil Under the Sun instead. However, these plans were postponed and the Nile rights secured.

The movie was made during a period of expansion for EMI Films under Michael Deeley and Barry Spikings, who were increasingly aiming at the international market with films like The Deer Hunter and Convoy. Death on the Nile was a more traditionally British film. Nat Cohen of EMI sold the film to US television for more than its budget.

The director, John Guillermin, had just made two blockbusters, The Towering Inferno and King Kong.

=== Casting ===
Albert Finney played Hercule Poirot in Murder on the Orient Express, but did not wish to undergo the heavy make-up required for Poirot in the Egyptian sun. The producers felt if they could not get Finney they should go in a totally different direction and picked Peter Ustinov. "Poirot is a character part if ever there was one", said producer Richard Goodwin, "and Peter is a top character actor."

An all-star cast was employed. This was Jane Birkin's first British movie in a decade.

=== Filming ===
The initial scenes set in England were filmed at the village of Hambleden, the main gates of Cliveden in Buckinghamshire and at the country house Compton Wynyates in Warwickshire.

The production spent seven weeks on location in Egypt in late 1977. Four weeks filming were on the steamer Karnak (the historic ship SS Memnon) and the rest at places such as Aswan, Abu Simbel, Luxor, and Cairo. Most of the time the ship was conveyed by smaller boats and the engines turned off, because they were so loud that they disrupted filming. Desert filming required makeup call at 4 a.m. and shooting at 6 a.m. to accommodate a two-hour delay around noon when temperatures hovered near 54 °C (130 °F). Bette Davis wryly commented "In the older days, they'd have built the Nile for you. Nowadays, films have become travelogues and actors stuntmen."

John Guillermin commented that the Egyptian government was supportive of the film because there were so many Agatha Christie fans in the country, and the story "was unpolitical". During the shoot, troubles arose as no hotel reservations had been made for the crew. They were shifted from hotel to hotel, sometimes on a daily basis. Director Guillermin never was allowed to see the rushes. By order of the producers, footage was sent directly to them in London. A lighter moment occurred during a love scene between Linnet Ridgeway Doyle (Lois Chiles) and Simon Doyle (Simon MacCorkindale), when a hostile desert fly landed on Chiles's teeth. The actors carried on as best they could, but the crew burst out laughing when Guillermin thankfully called "cut" and ordered another take.

Guillermin found the shoot logistically tricky because of the heat and the boat, which sometimes ran aground. But he enjoyed the cast:

The more experienced people created a very generous atmosphere. They were not impatient at all. I have never worked with Bette Davis before and was told she was professional but not communicative. Well, she was an absolute bastion of support and enthusiasm. During the breaks, the cast would often sit to one side engaged in terrific conversation. There was Ustinov's great wit and Niven's dry humour. Jack Warden is a very funny man and Mia Farrow is a very funny woman. This was a bunch of people who could relax.

"Poirot can be a cold fish, but here we made him more humanistic and warm, interested in young people for instance", said the director. "Peter Ustinov was able to bring that out." Costume designer Anthony Powell won the Academy Award for Best Costume Design, his second. Among his touches were shoes for Chiles that featured diamond studded heels that came from a millionaire's collection and shoes worn by Davis made from the scales of 26 pythons.

Cinematographer Jack Cardiff says he and Guillermin decided to give the film "an old fashioned 30s look". The choreography for the tango scene was provided by British dancer Wayne Sleep. In early 1978 David Niven's daughter Kristina was seriously injured in a car accident. Niven would fly from London to Switzerland on weekends during filming to sit by her bedside.

The film takes considerable liberties with Egyptian geography and history. For example, the characters are shown visiting the temples at Abu Simbel and Karnak the same day, apparently with no intervening journey time; these temples are some 480 km apart. Bessner claims that the pillars of the Great Hypostyle Hall at Karnak were built (presumably, he means repaired) in 1788 - this is incorrect, though eleven of the columns did collapse in 1899 and were reerected. Bessner also refers to the 'easternmost figure' as the 'Vocal Statue' at Abu Simbel. This seems to be a confusion with the northern of the Colossi of Memnon, though that statue has not 'sung' since ancient times - and there is in fact no 'easternmost' figure at the Abu Simbel site, which faces due east as its builders intended the temple to catch the sunrise.

== Release ==
For the US market, artist Richard Amsel was commissioned to do a film poster which reflected the U.S. public interest in "King Tut" at the time.

Although it was a British film, Death on the Nile premiered in New York on 29 September 1978 to coincide with the sale of tickets for the Metropolitan Museum of Art's opening on 15 December 1978 of the travelling exhibition The Treasures of Tutankhamun, which had piqued interest in Egyptian artefacts. For the U.S. market, artist Richard Amsel was commissioned to change the original British poster art by including the profile of King Tutankhamun with ceremonial knife (and modern revolver), surrounded by the cast.

In London, there was a Royal Charity Premiere at the ABC Shaftesbury Avenue on 23 October 1978, attended by Queen Elizabeth II, Prince Philip and Earl Mountbatten.

== Reception ==
=== Box office ===
The film was expected to be popular with audiences following on the heels of Murder on the Orient Express, the most successful British film up to that point. However, the box-office return was $14.5 million in the United States, lower than the $27.6 million high for Orient Express. EMI claimed it was the most successful foreign film shown in mainland China with 5 million admissions in Shanghai alone.

Nat Cohen said the film "did not do quite as well in America, though the US TV networks paid three times as much for it as they had done for Orient Express. It did ‘‘satisfactory”’ business in America — and made four times as much as Orient Express in Japan — but overall it grossed less than the first time."

=== Critical response ===
The Times' film critic David Robinson had mixed feelings about the film. Although it was entertaining, and followed the formula of the Murder on the Orient Express film four years earlier, he found it a bit too long and not quite as good. He concluded that screenwriter Anthony Shaffer and director John Guillermin were not quite as suitable to handle Agatha Christie's rich material as Paul Dehn and Sidney Lumet had been when they worked on Murder on the Orient Express. Pauline Kael was ambivalent: "Anthony Shaffer's adaptation ... has wit and edge and structure—too much structure, as it turns out, for the methodical pacing ... The movie is fatally perfunctory about emotion, atmosphere, suspense. But if the overall effect is disappointing, from moment to moment the details are never less than engaging, and are often knobby and funny. The steamer ... has a passenger list that includes Maggie Smith, in a triumphantly mannered performance, as a spinsterish nurse-companion, and Angela Lansbury, in a superlative caricature, as a wreck of a vamp ... Peter Ustinov is an ideal fatuous, vain Hercule Poirot ... " Leslie Halliwell wrote: "A pleasant thirties atmosphere and the travel poster backgrounds are the chief assets of this rather hesitant whodunnit which plays fair enough with the audience but gives its popular cast too little to do, while its constant repetitions of the crime become rather ghoulish. On the whole, though, a very passable representation of an old-fashioned genre ... "

Death on the Nile has received generally positive reviews by film critics more than 30 years later. The film holds an approval rating of 80% on Rotten Tomatoes, based on 20 reviews, with an average rating of 6.8/10.

== Awards and nominations ==
Award	Category	Subject	Result
Academy Awards	Best Costume Design	Anthony Powell	Won
Golden Globe Awards	Best Foreign Film		Nominated
BAFTA Awards	Best Actor	Peter Ustinov	Nominated
BAFTA Awards	Best Supporting Actress	Angela Lansbury	Nominated
BAFTA Awards	Best Supporting Actress	Maggie Smith	Nominated
BAFTA Awards	Best Costume Design	Anthony Powell	Won
Edgar Award	Best Motion Picture	Anthony Shaffer	Nominated
Evening Standard British Film Awards	Best Film	John Guillermin	Won
Evening Standard British Film Awards	Best Actor	Peter Ustinov	Won
National Board of Review Awards	Best Supporting Actress	Angela Lansbury	Won

== Sequels ==
A third Poirot film produced by John Brabourne and Richard Goodwin, Evil Under the Sun, was released in 1982. This was also written by Anthony Shaffer and starred Peter Ustinov as Poirot.

Ustinov went on to play Poirot in three TV movies, and a final film in 1988, Appointment with Death.
