= Appointment with Death (film) =

1988 Poirot mystery film directed by Michael Winner

- Original cinema poster
- Directed by: Michael Winner
- Screenplay by: Michael Winner; Anthony Shaffer; Peter Buckman
- Based on: Appointment with Death (1938 novel) by Agatha Christie
- Produced by: Michael Winner; Menahem Golan; Yoram Globus
- Starring: Peter Ustinov; Lauren Bacall; Carrie Fisher; John Gielgud; Piper Laurie; Hayley Mills; Jenny Seagrove; David Soul
- Cinematography: David Gurfinkel
- Edited by: Arnold Crust Jr. (Michael Winner)
- Music by: Pino Donaggio
- Production company: Cannon Films
- Distributed by: Cannon Film Distributors
- Release date: 15 April 1988 (US)
- Running time: 102 minutes
- Country: United States
- Language: English
- Budget: $6 million
- Box office: $960,040

Appointment with Death is a 1988 American mystery film and sequel produced and directed by Michael Winner. Made by Golan-Globus Productions, the film is an adaptation of the 1938 Agatha Christie novel Appointment with Death featuring the detective Hercule Poirot. The screenplay was co-written by Winner, Peter Buckman, and Anthony Shaffer, the latter writing the script ten years earlier.

The film stars Peter Ustinov as Poirot, along with Lauren Bacall, Carrie Fisher, John Gielgud, Piper Laurie, Hayley Mills, Jenny Seagrove and David Soul. It is a follow-up to numerous other theatrical and made-for-television adaptions starring Ustinov, as well as 1974's Murder on the Orient Express.

It marks Ustinov's final portrayal of Hercule Poirot.

== Plot ==
Emily Boynton, stepmother to the three Boynton children – Lennox, Raymond, and Carol – and mother to Ginevra, blackmails the family lawyer, Jefferson Cope, into destroying her late husband's second will that would split his fortune between her and his children, leaving them $200,000 each, freeing them from her controlling presence. The original will leaves all of the Boynton fortune to Emily, only splitting it evenly amongst the children upon her death.

She takes the stepchildren and Nadine, Lennox's wife who serves as Emily's nurse, on holiday to Europe. In Trieste, the great detective Hercule Poirot runs into an old friend, Dr. Sarah King. Sarah soon falls in love with Raymond Boynton, to Emily's disapproval.

Lady Westholme is introduced. She was born American but has had British nationality for the last ten years due to marriage, during which she became a member of parliament. She, archaeologist Miss Quinton, and lawyer Cope are also on their way to Jerusalem and Qumran.

The Boynton family are surprised to see Cope on the ship. The adult step-children discover the existence of a second will their father told Lennox about before he died. Emily continues to bully her step-children. Cope is flirting with Nadine who overtly accepts his courting. He also resists Emily's demand that he stay away from them. Emily poisons Cope's wine with her digitalis medication, but the wine is spilled when Nadine's husband strikes Cope, having found an engraved cigarette case which Cope had given her. Poirot observes several cockroaches drinking from the spill and dying, and keeps a close eye on the family when they disembark.

At the archaeological dig, Cope, Nadine, Lennox, Carol, Raymond and Dr King go for a walk, but Lennox turns back, upset by his wife's preference for Cope. Later the others return one by one. Dr King notices an Arab man trying to wake Emily. When she goes over, she finds Emily dead. Dr. King examines the body and identifies the cause of death as heart failure, but Poirot points out it is wise to be suspicious when there is a death of someone who is widely hated. He asks Dr King to check her medical bag and she finds it disordered, with an empty bottle of digitalis and a syringe missing.

Poirot deduces that Mrs. Boynton was injected with a lethal dose of digitalis, corresponding to a medicine she took administered by two drops in a glass of water by Nadine, in order that her death appear to be by heart failure. Since the family could have injected the digitalis without needing an additional syringe, he suspects an outsider.

Poirot arranges to meet with a local youth who witnessed the murder, but he never arrives, scared off by an unknown third party. Dr. King chases him through the streets, passing by many of the Boyntons and Lady Westholme. As she catches the boy, a gun is fired and the boy is killed. Dr King is arrested, but claims he was shot before her eyes by an unseen assailant. Poirot has her released so she can travel with him to meet the others for a 'picnic' where he plans to reveal what happened. Having suggested that all the step-children lied about seeing their step-mother alive when she was actually dead (thinking one of them may have done it and wishing to delay or protect them against discovery), Poirot clears them of suspicion.

At a banquet later that night, Poirot reveals the truth: Lady Westholme is the murderer. She was once in prison and Emily had recognised her from her time as a prison warden. To keep her quiet and maintain her status, Lady Westholme injected Mrs. Boynton with digitalis from Dr. King's bag and silenced the witness. Disturbed by the revelation, Lady Westholme flees to her room.

During a fireworks show following the banquet, Lady Westholme shoots herself in her hotel room, not willing to return to prison. Poirot persuades the local authorities to consider her death an accident, not wanting to disparage the late Lady's reputation further.

== Cast ==
- Peter Ustinov as Hercule Poirot
- Lauren Bacall as Lady Westholme
- Carrie Fisher as Nadine Boynton
- John Gielgud as Colonel Carbury
- Piper Laurie as Emily Boynton
- Hayley Mills as Miss Quinton
- Jenny Seagrove as Dr. Sarah King
- David Soul as Jefferson Cope
- Nicholas Guest as Lennox Boynton
- Valerie Richards as Carol Boynton
- John Terlesky as Raymond Boynton
- Amber Bezer as Ginevra Boynton
- Douglas Sheldon as Captain Rogers
- Mike Sarne as Healey
- Michael Craig as Lord Peel

== Production ==
Filming took place in Israel. The denouement takes place at the Springs of Sataf. Lauren Bacall, who was Jewish, agreed to be cast in the film as it gave her the opportunity to visit Israel for the first time.

Director Michael Winner had become known for violent films but this represented a change of pace. "You won't see Lauren Bacall walking around machine-gunning everyone," he said. "In fact, it's my first picture in years that was under budget on blood." There were plans for Winner to adapt another Agatha Christie tale for the film the following year, but this did not happen.

Portions of the film were shot at the historic American Colony Hotel, founded in 1902 by star Peter Ustinov's grandfather Plato von Ustinov.

== Reception ==
=== Box office ===
It was the seventh worst performing movie at the box office in 1988.

=== Critical reception ===
The film received a mixed reception and holds a score of 42% on review aggregate site Rotten Tomatoes. Vincent Canby wrote in The New York Times that the film "is not up to the stylish standard of the earlier all-star, Hercule Poirot mysteries, especially Sidney Lumet's Murder on the Orient Express. The pleasures of the form are not inexhaustible, and this time the physical production looks sort of cut-rate." Michael Wilmington of the Los Angeles Times blasted the film as "unsatisfying, even a little soporific [with a] tendency to blame co-writer-producer-director Michael Winner, whose 1978 adaptation of The Big Sleep ruined the story by translating its action from Los Angeles in the 1930s to London in the 1970s."

The Chicago Tribune was unimpressed: "a group of present and former celebrities pass a few pleasant weeks touring the Israeli desert. It must have been fun, but the movie they brought back is not....Director Winner appears to be trying for something droll and sophisticated, but there's no wit in the characters or life in the performances, and the picture quickly becomes about as exciting as searching for discrepancies in a train schedule."

The film was also blasted in Variety: "Peter Ustinov hams his way through 'Appointment with Death' one more time as ace Belgian detective 'Hercuool Pwarow,' but neither he nor glitz can lift the pic from an impression of little more than a routine whodunit. Even the normally amusing Ustinov looks a bit jaded in his third big-screen outing as the sleuth, as well as several TV productions. Director Michael Winner has some fine Israeli locations to play with, but his helming is only lackluster, the script and characterizations bland, and there simply are not enough murders to sustain the interest of even the most avid Agatha Christie fan." Critic David Aldridge, from an issue of Film Review magazine dated May 1988, classified the film as "another loser from Winner, though, to give the man some small due, even a more talented director would have floundered forcing freshness in such formularised fare." He also criticized Cannon Films for the production value of a film that ostensibly was shot on an exotic location, with the quote: "But, then, it is a Cannon Film and they're not known for spending a penny when a halfpenny would just about do. Good for TV." The BBC broadcast the film a few years after its release.

Anthony Shaffer called it "dreadful".

== Changes ==
The novel takes place primarily in Petra, Jordan, whereas the film takes place in Jerusalem and Qumran (near the Dead Sea). This change was made because the production company of Yoram Globus and Menahem Golan was based in Israel.

== Home media ==
Acorn Media, as part of their Agatha Christie Poirot collection, released the movie on DVD and Blu-ray in Region 1 (U.S. and Canada) on April 16, 2012. It was the final Ustinov Poirot film to be released on the format.
