= The Tales of Beatrix Potter =

1971 British film by Reginald Mills

- Theatrical release poster
- Directed by: Reginald Mills
- Screenplay by: Richard Goodwin; Christine Edzard
- Based on: stories by Beatrix Potter
- Produced by: Richard Goodwin executive John Brabourne
- Starring: Royal Ballet dancers: Frederick Ashton; Alexander Grant; Michael Coleman; Wayne Sleep; Lesley Collier
- Cinematography: Austin Dempster
- Edited by: John Rushton
- Music by: John Lanchbery
- Production companies: GW Films, EMI Elstree
- Distributed by: MGM-EMI Film Distributors Ltd.
- Release date: 30 June 1971
- Running time: 90 minutes
- Country: United Kingdom
- Language: English
- Budget: less than $600,000 or £256,000

The Tales of Beatrix Potter (US title: Peter Rabbit and Tales of Beatrix Potter) is a 1971 ballet film based on the children's stories of English author and illustrator Beatrix Potter. The film was directed by Reginald Mills, choreographed by Sir Frederick Ashton (who danced the role of Mrs. Tiggy-Winkle), and featured dancers from The Royal Ballet. The musical score was arranged by John Lanchbery from various sources, such as the operas of Michael Balfe and of Sir Arthur Sullivan, and performed by the Orchestra of the Royal Opera House conducted by Lanchbery. It was produced by Richard Goodwin with John Brabourne as executive producer. The stories were adapted by Goodwin and his wife designer Christine Edzard.

The Tales of Beatrix Potter is the only feature film directed by Mills, who is best remembered as a film editor. Mills edited The Red Shoes (1948) and other films directed and produced by Powell and Pressburger that incorporated ballet.

== Production ==
=== Development ===
The idea started in 1968 when Christine Edzard travelled from Paris, where she was assistant to the designer Lila de Nobili, to work on the sets of Zeffirelli's Romeo and Juliet (1968) in Rome. There she met Richard Goodwin, associate producer for John Brabourne who was making Romeo and Juliet. Edzard and Goodwin became a couple and decided to make a movie together.

While in Britain meeting Goodwin's mother, Edzard saw and heard Beatrix Potter for the first time as Mrs. Goodwin read The Tale of Mrs. Tiggy-Winkle to her grandchildren. Edzard showed the "thoroughly English" book to Nobili, who was in Covent Garden with The Sleeping Beauty ballet, which featured dancing animals, mice and a cat. Nobili suggested it as a project for the couple, and the Tales as a ballet was born.

Lila de Nobili had brought Rostislav Doboujinsky over from Paris to make animal masks for the first act of The Sleeping Beauty and Doboujinsky talked with Goodwin and Edzard. In October 1969, he agreed to make a sample mask for mouse character 'Hunca Munca' whose face is "perhaps the most appealing in the film".

Conceived of as a filmed ballet, Goodwin and Edzard approached Frederick Ashton, former director of the Royal Ballet, to be choreographer. Ashton later said: "I was not certain that with films dominated by violence and sex the time was right for such an explosion of sheer charm. But now I think the public is more than ready for something like this."

The couple's first approach to Frederick Warne, Beatrix Potter's publisher, was turned down firmly. (The estate had turned down an approach from Walt Disney because they were worried he would distort the work.) However, their ideas and Christine's initial sketches began to win them over and while both Warne and Ashton were still considering the proposed project, and terms being agreed, preparations for filming took place over the following year. It was a risk, and Goodwin acknowledged that had Warne in the end still refused, they would have "been ruined."

Goodwin succeeded in getting the film rights from Potter's estate. According to Bryan Forbes they only paid £5,000 for these.

The film was given the go ahead by Forbes during his period as head of production at EMI Films. Forbes recalled that the EMI Board were not enthusiastic, and Nat Cohen had never heard of Beatrix Potter, but Forbes had complete artistic control for any movie made with a budget under £1 million so could easily gain approval. "We were extremely lucky," said Brabourne about Forbes. Forbes later called it "one of the most original movies ever made".

=== Pre-production ===
Instead of a conventional screenplay, Edzard, who co-wrote the screenplay as well as designing the production and costumes, produced over two hundred sketches. The sketches were used to create the film's working script from a juxtaposition of five of Beatrix Potter's Tales—The Tale of Jemina Puddleduck, The Tale of Pigling Bland, The Tale of Jeremy Fisher, The Tale of Two Bad Mice and The Tale of Squirrel Nutkin. The film deviates at times from the plots but retains the authenticity of Potter's original, and features visitors such as Peter Rabbit from other books.

It was the first collaboration with Goodwin by Edzard, who is known for her meticulous filmmaking, often based on Victorian English sources. The couple went on to found Sands Films. Their productions since include Stories from a Flying Trunk (1979), The Nightingale (1981), Biddy (1983), Little Dorrit (1987), The Fool (1990), As You Like It (1991), Amahl and the Night Visitors (1996), The IMAX Nutcracker (1997), The Children's Midsummer Night's Dream (2001) and The Good Soldier Schwejk (2018).

John Brabourne said Goodwin and Edzard "made all the costumes in their own house and we used my production company. Christine brought in that fantastic man, Rostislav Doboujinsky, who did the masks. It was all their conception, their idea, so I got behind it and pushed it but I thought it only fair that Richard should have the Producer credit."

With Christine Edzard, Doboujinsky made the masks "on which much of the picture's success depended". Doboujinsky's original masks for the film, made of bike helmets, polystyrene, hand-sewn hair and vision holes covered in gauze, had to be recreated for the stage, with a larger field of vision for the dancers. The artist used moulds of the originals, drilling hundreds of holes at the front and covering the mask in nylon hair "using electrostatic charges."

The music was arranged by John Lanchbery, who had previously worked with Ashton on La fille mal gardée, Les Deux Pigeons and The Dream, based on themes by Balfe, George Jacobs, Ludwig Minkus, Jacques Offenbach, Arthur Sullivan and others.

Producer Richard Goodwin called the film "a diversion... a souffle... it is an entertainment." The costumes travelled to the US as an exhibition on board the QE2 in the year the film was released.

=== Shooting ===
Filming started in August 1970 at EMI's Elstree Studios where the unit was based for five weeks. There had already been second unit photography done at the Lakes District.

== Cast ==
- Mrs Tiggy-Winkle—Frederick Ashton
- Peter Rabbit / Pigling Bland—Alexander Grant
- Mrs. Tittlemouse—Julie Wood
- Johnny Townmouse—Keith Martin
- Jemima Puddle-Duck—Ann Howard
- Fox—Robert Mead
- Alexander—Garry Grant
- Aunt Pettitoes / Tabitha Twitchit—Sally Ashby
- Berkshire Pig—Brenda Last
- Mr Jeremy Fisher—Michael Coleman
- Tom Thumb / Squirrel Nutkin—Wayne Sleep
- Hunca Munca—Lesley Collier
- Old Brown, the owl—Leslie Edwards

The cast also includes Érin Geraghty as Potter, Joan Benham as the nurse and Wilfred Babbage as the butler.

== Release ==
The film was given a Royal premiere in front of Queen Elizabeth II on 1 April 1971.

== Reception ==
=== Box office ===
The film was one of the most successful of the Forbes regime at EMI Films. It was one of the most popular movies in 1971 at the British box office. By June 1972 it earned EMI a profit of £18,000.

In 1994 Bryan Forbes confirmed the film was very profitable.

=== Critical ===
The Evening Standard called it "an enchanting film that generations of children will enjoy."

A 1971 review by Roger Ebert was favourable: "The stories are told simply and directly and with a certain almost clumsy charm. Instead of going for perfection in the dancing, the Royal Ballet dancers have gone for characterizations instead. The various animals have their quirks and eccentricities, and they are fairly authentic: The frog dances like a frog, for example, and not like Nureyev."

Anthony Nield wrote in 2011, "Tales of Beatrix Potter is one of British cinema's true one-offs, a film quite unlike any other. Ostensibly aimed at children, this adaptation of Potter’s various animal-centric stories was mounted by the Royal Ballet and choreographed by Sir Frederick Ashton. The tales are rendered as a series of dances, loosely interconnected by the author as a young girl (played by Érin Geraghty) and her active imagination. There are no words, only music and movement as the performers of the Royal Ballet—in full animal costume—interpret her stories' simple narratives."

== Awards ==
The film's designer, Christine Edzard, was nominated for BAFTA awards for Best Art Direction and for Best Costume Design.

== Legacy ==
John Brabourne says Agatha Christie let him have the screen rights to Murder on the Orient Express because she liked Tales of Beatrix Potter.

The same team made a movie based on Hans Christian Andersen stories, Stories from a Flying Trunk (1979).

In 1992, Anthony Dowell, then Director of The Royal Ballet, produced a stage version of the film.

== Home media ==
The film was released to DVD in 2004 and 2009. A digitally restored version was released as a Blu-ray Disc/DVD combo in 2011, in commemoration of the film's 40th anniversary.
