= The Man with the Plan (film) =

British film

- Directed by: Christine Edzard
- Produced by: Olivier Stockman
- Starring: Simon Callow; Mark Thomas
- Cinematography: Joachim Bergamin
- Music by: Michael Sanvoisin
- Production company: Sands Films
- Release date: 17 April 2026
- Country: United Kingdom
- Language: English

The Man with the Plan released on 17 April 2026 is an independent film directed by Christine Edzard and produced by Olivier Stockman at Sands Films Studios in London. It tells the story of a young woman of today who discovers the 1942 Beveridge Report by the British politician William Beveridge, which formed the basis of Britain's welfare state. The film features Simon Callow and Mark Thomas. The music is by Michael Sanvoisin and cinematography by Joachim Bergamin.

The film is regularly screened at Sands Films Studio's Cinema and Townsend Theatre Production handles bookings outside London.

== Cast ==
- Simon Callow as William Beveridge
- Sophie Jenkin as Flea
- Neil Gore as Want
- Mark Thomas as The Narrator
- Alfie Stewart as Zig
- Sam Barnard as Gus
- Alan Cox as The Devil
- Sebastian Armesto as Charles Dickens
- Seamus Allen as George Bernard Shaw
- Hal Cruttenden as Winston Churchill
- Michael Mears as Sir John Anderson
- Hywel Simons as Jim Griffiths
- Colin Campbell as Quintin Hogg
- Wayne Norman as Mr Murray
- Danny Dorling as Herbert Morrison
- Miriam Margolyes as The voice of Squalor
- Neil D'Souza as The Paramedic
- Siobhán Nicholas as Biddy
- Andrew Tiernan as Aneurin Bevan
- David Risley as The Man from Rugeley
- Graham Seed as Mr Everyman / The voice of the Fly
- Kevin O'Donohoe as Joe Skiver / A politician
- Tweedy as Jack Striver / The Salvationist
- David Bernstein as Deliveroo rider / A politician
- Amelda Brown as Wendy Warbler
- Vanessa Kore as Jemima Juggler
- Simon Furness as Larry Landlord / A politician
- Vladyslava Garkusha as Algorina
- Julia Davies as The Dodo
- Celia Bannerman and Laura Cox as The Mermaids of Manningtree

== Production ==
Filming began in October 2024 for The Man with the Plan which will star Simon Callow as William Beveridge and comedian Mark Thomas as the Narrator. Comedian Hal Cruttenden will appear as Winston Churchill and Andrew Tiernan as Nye Bevan, with newcomer Sophie Jenkin starring as the young woman of today who discovers the plan and its vision for the future.

On 12 and 13 April 2025, Sands Films held a filmed public event at their studios in Rotherhithe and invited political campaigners and activists to speak about their campaigns and issues in relation to the "giants" of Beveridge's report – squalor, idleness, ignorance, disease and poverty. Mark Thomas hosted the event and speakers included Danny Dorling, Kate Pickett, and Michael Marmot. The speeches were recorded on the day and made available online. Simon Pirani from the organisation Fare Free London spoke at the event and presented the case for free public transport in London and across Britain. Author and journalist Tansy Hoskins spoke about the anniversary of the Rana Plaza collapse in 2013.

Sands Films, the production company who made the film, is run by Christine Edzard, the screenwriter and director, and her husband Richard B. Goodwin.

The film is the eleventh by Edzard, known for her meticulous filmmaking, often based on Victorian English sources. Other productions include Stories from a Flying Trunk (1979), Biddy (1983), Little Dorrit (1987), The Fool (1989), As You Like It (1991), The Children's Midsummer Night's Dream (2001), The Good Soldier Schwejk (2018).

== Reception ==
Writing in The Big Issue, John Bird described the film as "an urgent film for our desperate times", "a full-blown exposition on why if we had done what Beveridge advocated we might be in a better place today" and "an important aid in our fight against poverty's predominance". He praised Simon Callow's "powerfully presented William Beveridge". In an article on the website DMovies, Victor Fraga wrote: "The Man with the Plan is a movie with a mission: to educate and to provoke viewers. The call to action is unambiguous in the final scene, when various protestors take Sands by storm...."
