= Rostislav Doboujinsky =

Russian designer (1903–2000)

- Doboujinsky working in his studio
- Born: 3 April 1903; St Petersburg, Russian Empire
- Died: 23 June 2000 (aged 97); Paris, France
- Resting place: Sainte-Genevieve-des-Bois, Île-de-France,
- Known for: Design of masks, costumes, sets, stage, posters, interiors
- Notable work: Ondine (1939); Le Plaisir (1951); The Sleeping Beauty (ballet) (1968); The Tales of Beatrix Potter (1971); Peines de Coeur d'une Chatte Anglaise (1977)
- Spouse: Lydia Nikolaevna nee Kopniaeff (died 1965)
- Family: Mstislav Valerianovich Doboujinsky (father); Elizaveta Osipovna nee Wolkenstein (mother)

Rostislav Doboujinsky (3 April 1903 – 23 June 2000) was a Russian designer of costumes, masks, sets and interiors, and a painter and illustrator. He belonged to the second generation of Russian artists who developed the tradition of the 'Ballets Russes' in Western Europe. He was noted for his work on Louis Jouvet's Ondine by Jean Giraudoux in the 1930s and Max Ophul's film Le Plaisir in 1951, for the mouse masks and costumes he created for Rudolf Nureyev's The Nutcracker (1967), the costumes for The Sleeping Beauty ballet at London's Covent Garden (1968) and the animal masks for The Tales of Beatrix Potter (1971). He achieved international success with his masks for Alfredo Arias's adaption of Balzac's Peines de Coeur d'une Chatte Anglaise (1977).

== Biography ==
=== Early life ===
Drawing by Doboujinsky - Portrait d'un poéte russe, 1939

Rostislav Mstislavovitch Doboujinsky was born on 3 April 1903 in Saint Petersburg, Russian Empire. He was the eldest son of ballet and opera designer Mstislav Valerianovich Doboujinsky, who co-founded the Le Monde de l'art movement - mir iskusstva - with Alexandre Benois and Sergei Diaghilev. Introduced from childhood to the world of the arts by his father, he took classical secondary studies in Russia and attended the Higher School of Fine Arts in Petrograd. In 1920 he worked as assistant designer at the Gorky theatre in Petrograd, in 1921 received his first stage design credit and in 1922 worked as set and costume designer for avant-garde and research group “Le Jeune Theater”. In 1924, the family fled to Lithuania where the young Doboujinsky was employed at the Kaunas theatre. A year later Rostislav moved to France with his wife Lydia, where he worked as a set designer and Lydia founded a fashion house which supplied costumes to ballets in Sweden and Monte Carlo. From 1925–27 he also studied at the National School of Decorative Arts and the Faculty of Letters in the Sorbonne. In 1939, Doboujinsky designed the costumes for Ondine, then worked with Christian Bérard, Leonor Fini, Lila de Nobili, and founded his own set workshop with Lydia. In 1950, he became a member of Societe des auteurs, compositeurs et editeurs de musique (SACEM).

=== The Sleeping Beauty (1968) and Tales of Beatrix Potter (1971) ===
Wolf mask from The Sleeping Beauty (1968)

Lila de Nobili brought Doboujinsky over from Paris to make animal masks for the first act of The Sleeping Beauty at Covent Garden. According to the V&A, Doboujinsky's wolf mask for this ballet was:

"a superb example of animal headdress-making. It was devised by the great mask-maker Rostislav Doboujinsky... Dancing under the heat of stage lights is uncomfortable, and having to wear full head mask is not popular with the performers, so the masks have to be as light as possible and give some ventilation. By the 1960s, new materials allowed Doboujinsky to create heads that were substantial but light enough to be worn for long periods, give as wide an angle of vision as possible and try to ensure that the wearer did not overheat."

Mouse masks from The Tales of Beatrix Potter (1971)

While at Covent Garden, Doboujinsky talked with Richard Goodwin and Christine Edzard, the producer and writers for The Tales of Beatrix Potter (1971). In October 1969, he agreed to make a sample mask for The Tales' mouse character 'Hunca Munca', whose face is “perhaps the most appealing in the film”. He remade the mask thirteen times over the winter, working “at his own pace – and to his own standard of perfection” until he was satisfied with the fourteenth attempt in February 1970. Doboujinsky collaborated with Christine Edzard on the masks “on which much of the picture's success depended”. His original masks for the film, made of bike helmets, polystyrene, hand-sewn hair and vision holes covered in gauze, had to be recreated for the stage, with a larger field of vision for the dancers. The artist used moulds of the originals, drilling hundreds of holes at the front and covering the mask in nylon hair “using electrostatic charges.”

=== Interior Design ===
Chandeliers: Great Gala, May 1962. Courtesy Royal Albert Hall Archive ref: RAHE/3/1962/1

A collaboration in the 1960s with Renzo Mongiardino at the International Second World Congress of Man-Made Fibres Gala launched Doboujinsky into interior design, where he worked alongside other outstanding designers including Luchino Visconti, Franco Zeffirelli and Giorgio Strehler. The Great Gala was held at the Royal Albert Hall in London on 3 May 1962, and was “A Gala Divertimento of music, song and dance and brilliant decor” featuring renowned artists including Yehudi Menuhin. It was staged by Zeffirrelli with costumes by Lila de Nobili, orchestra conducted by Adrian Boult and design by Mongiardino. Tonton created a 20 ft tall chandelier surrounded by a dozen smaller ones, each piece of 'crystal' created using tiny pastry molds.

His first work for the Rothschild family was a coming-of-age party at the Château de Ferrières near Paris for which he made a dozen big plastic chandeliers for the ballroom and an enormous candelabra for the roof. Opulent chandeliers became a Doboujinsky trademark. Another project was the refurbishment in 1974 by Mongiardino's team of one of the Rothschild residences – the Hôtel Lambert on the Île Saint-Louis in Paris. Doboujinsky designed a fake cordovan-leather dado and borders to frame a series of 17th century panels depicting David's triumph over Goliath, across the four walls of one room. For Marie-Helene de Rothschild's bedroom he created extravagant wall coverings inspired by a 17th-century rug.

Doboujinsky‘s technique was a combination of “unorthodox materials” and “painstaking craft”. For the dado at Hôtel Lambert he made a shallow mould, adding latex to it to make sheets of embossed “leather’ which he gilded and glazed using centuries-old methods. Designer Claudio Briganti described Doboujinsky as “enormously inquisitive”, exploring “scores of craft techniques” rather than relying simply on stencils and “faux-marbre”. For Marie-Helene de Rothschild’s bedroom wallcoverings he took inspiration from a very old, “enormous” and “very worn” Persian rug whose weave could not have been reproduced. Instead Doboujinsky combined painting methods, using pigments of oil paints and gouache applied to the back of canvas which seeped through to the front to evoke the colours and motifs of the original and “suggest its lovely threadbare quality”.

In 1981–1982, Doboujinsky worked on the design for Hans Heinrich Thyssen-Bornemisza's New York dining room – inspired by the floral pattern of an 18th-century Turkish rug. Doboujinsky used silk-screen and textile-printing methods on a variety of suitable materials – silk, velvet, terrycloth and burlap - to produce a “correspondence” of colour and motif to the original ancient rug, rather than a precise copy. According to Briganti, Doboujinsky’s painting and sculpting talents were “rarely allied in one so ingeniously inventive person” and is what made him “uniquely valuable”.

=== Peines du coeur d'une chatte anglaise (1977) and later years ===
Masks from Peines du coeur d'une chatte anglaise Museum of the City of New York. Access. no. 95.139.958

Doboujinsky received international recognition for the masks he created for Alfredo Arias' 1977 production of Peines du Coeur d'une chatte anglaise, based on the story by Honoré de Balzac in Scenes from the Private and Public Life of Animals, illustrated by J. J. Grandville. The play was produced for the Shiraz festival and toured France from 1977 to 1983. In March 1980 it went to Broadway at the Theatre Anta, as Heartaches of a Pussycat. Costumes were designed by Claudie Gastine and animal masks by Doboujinsky.

Walter Kerr, reviewing the Broadway show for the New York Times in March 1980, wrote :

“There are whiskered tomcats in frock coats, beribboned dachshunds in tea-party finery. Birds with beaks you'd do well to shy away from...I can't believe that anyone has ever designed masks – they're full, three-dimensional heads, really - more persuasive than those here provided by R. Doboujinsky.”, said Walter Kerr.

At the age of eighty, working in collaboration with Sabine Dutilh, Doboujinsky designed the sets, costumes and masks for Arias and Kado Kostzer's Sortileges in 1983, which were “a great strength of the production”. His design work featured “many exquisite details” such as ermine tails along the hem of the red curtains, and an “especially fanciful” Jester's costume in which the “egg-like bald head was balanced in front by a pear-shaped belly”, creating an effect of “delicate grotesqueness.”

=== Personal life and legacy ===
Drawing of 'Tonton' by Lila de Nobili

A modest man, Doboujinsky referred to himself as a “jack of all trades”, “only an amateur, only a dabbler” and was referred to by the entire profession as 'Tonton' ('uncle').

Actress Marilù Marini, who played the English cat 'Beauty' in Arias's Peines de Coeur d'une Chatte Anglaise said of him: “He was a great artist who remained like a child who goes to the theater for the first time and wants to know what is behind the scenes." Journalist Jean-Louis Perrier wrote in Le Monde: "He never exhibited his immense culture or science. Every time, he was inventing something new. Everything for him was a bridge to the imagination. And there was this baroque, expressive, fantastic, Russian side in all his creations.”

Alfredo Arias and René de Ceccatty paid homage to Doboujinsky in Les Peines de coeur d'une chat française (1999) in the guise of a big bear named Djinsky.

Although Doboujinsky was so detailed in his work and obsessed by craftmanship, he lived in minimalist surroundings, spending most of his time in a cluttered studio in the working class quarter of Belleville in Paris. He said “I’ve never planned a décor for myself”, as a child “I lived among pictures and furnishings of immense worth that provided the groundwork for my visual education…..Now I’d rather devote my days to doing interiors for others.”

In 1983 he joined forces with Sabine Dutilh who, until then, had been his assistant. The two collaborated on development and creation of works.

During his long life in France, Doboujinsky maintained his status as Lithuanian political refugee. He applied for, and obtained, French nationality a few months before he died in Paris on 23 June 2000.

== List of Works ==
Decade/s	Year	Role	Production / Theatre	Info
1920s	1920	Assistant designer	Gorky Theatre, Petrograd	
1920s	1922	Set and costume designer	Le Jeune Theater	
1920s	1924	Designer	Theatre de Chambre, Riga, Latvia	
1920s	1924	Assistant to Mstislav Doboujinsky (father)	Kaunas, Lithuania	
1920s	1925	Set designer	The Queen of Spades (Tchaikovsky), Kaunas theatre, Lithuania	
1920s		Designer	Theatre de la Chauve-Souris, Paris	
1920s		Set and costume model creator	Lithuanian National Opera and Ballet Theatre, Compagnie Georges Pitoeff, "Ballet National Suedois" and Ballet Russe de Monte Carlo	
1920s		Cinema poster model maker	Luna Film	
1920s		Poster maker	leaflets and advertising boards – Loubok, Paris	
1920s		Designer	games and toys - Vera	
1920s		Creator animations, sets	Cine Service and Dessins Animes Associes	
1930s-1940s	1939	Costume designer	Louis Jouvet's Ondine by Jean Giraudoux	the first performance of Ondine opened on April 27, 1939 at the Theatre de l'Athenee
1930s-1940s		Set and costume creator	Boris Knyazev company, Theatre Russe, and the Ballets du Marquis de Cuevas	
1930s-1940s		Fabric, theatre costume, mask and accessories	Compagnie Charles Dullin (Les Oiseaux), Jean Vilar at Theatre National Populaire (Nuclea), Compagnie Jean-Louis Barrault (Julius Cesar, Tete d'Or, The Rape of Lucretia, The Rhinoceros by Eugene Ionesco), Paris Opera (Carmen, La Dame aux Camelias), Comedie-Francaise (Ruy Blas)	
1950s	1950	Costume designer	Maxim Gorky's The Lower Depths at Theatre de l'Oeuvre	in collaboration with Sacha Pitoeff
1950s	1951	Mask creator	Max Ophuls's film Le Plaisir	Doboujinsky created the mask worn by Ambroise, played by Jean Galland, to disguise his aged appearance.
1950s	1957	Set and costume designer	The Crucible (Les Sorcieres de Salem) (film) by Raymond Rouleau	In collaboration with Lila de Nobili.
1950s	1957	Design model maker	Christmas windows – The Snow Queen – for Galeries Lafayette	In collaboration with Lila de Nobili.
1960s	1962	Maker of chandeliers	The Second World Congress of Man-Made Fibres or Great Gala, Royal Albert Hall, London	In collaboration with Renzo Mongiardino.
1960s	1962	Designer, sculpture creator	Raoul Levy's Marco Polo (film).	clothes and caparacons for men, horses and elephants – living figures of a chess game
1960s	1963	Costume designer, manager of costume design workshop	Cyrano de Bergerac, Comedie-Francaise.	
1960s	1965	Costume designer	Numance, Jean-Louis Barrault, Odeon.	
1960s	1965	Maker of sculptures for masks and accessories	Contes d'Offmann, Opera-Comique.	
1960s	1965	Creator of models, sculptures and masks, and costume designer	The Merchant of Venice, Teatro Valle, Rome.	
1960s	1966	Head of Specialist Design Department	The Taming of the Shrew (film) by Franco Zeffirelli.	
1960s	1967	Maker of set and costume design models	L'Orfeo, Amsterdam	In collaboration with Jean-Marie Simon
1960s	1967	Creator of mouse mask and costumes –	The Nutcracker, Stockholm, by Rudolf Nureyev.	
1960s	1968-1969	Costume designer, mask maker	The Sleeping Beauty, Covent Garden, London	In collaboration with Lila de Nobili.
1960s	1968-1969	Costume design models	Blood Wedding, Lyon.	
1960s	(1960s)	Creation of chandeliers and candelabra	Château de Ferrières, France.	
1970s	1969–1970	Mask maker, co-creator costume design	The Tales of Beatrix Potter (film) by Christine Edzard, London.	
1970s	1969–1970	Creator of patterns and painted decorations for costumes	Malatesta, Comedie-Francaise	
1970s	1969–1970	Creator costume models and masks	Rashomon, Lyon and Spoleto (Festival dei Due Mondi)	
1970s	1969–1970	Sculptor of heads for animals	Christmas windows – The Private and Public Life of Animals by J. J. Grandville – for Galeries Lafayette	
1970s	1969–1970	Costumes and masks	Reportage sur un squelette ou Masques et bergamasques film, directed by Michel Mitrani, in collaboration with Leonor Fini.	
1970s	1971	Set and costume model maker	L'Histoire du Soldat, Cartoucherie de Vincennes	
1970s	1971	Sculptures and models, armour and breastplates	Don Quichotte, Festival de Carcassonne	
1970s	1973	Creator costume models	Liliana Cavani's film Milarepa.	
1970s	1973	Creator, sculptor and model maker for ball masks	Un ballo in maschera, directed by Franco Zeffirelli, Teatro alla Scala, Milan	
1970s	1974	Modelling, sculpting, painting and creation work	framing of The Triumph of David, and creation of bedroom wall coverings – Hôtel Lambert, Paris.	
1970s	1977	Creator of masks	Peines de Coeur d'une Chatte Anglais by Alfredo Arias	with Marilu Marini in the title role.
1970s	1978	Designer of Egyptian tomb	Agatha Christie's Death on the Nile (film) directed by John Guillermin	
1970s	1978	Mask creator	Alice in Wonderland, Holiday on Ice	
1970s	1979	Costumes and painting	Ballet de Legumes in Little Ida's Flowers – Christine Edzard's film Stories from a Flying Trunk and later designed as costumes for the ballet Pas de legumes by Frederick Ashton	
1980s	1980	Creator of cat masks and costumes	L'enfant et les sortilèges, Metropolitan Opera	
1980s	1981–1982	Creation of various decorative interior panels	a 'gothic-Indian' decoration for the tea room of an English residence; fabric paints for the walls of Hans Heinrich Thyssen-Bornemisza's dining-room in New York; the walls of a living room, Quai Voltaire (Paris)	
1980s	1982	Drawings and sculptures for bas-relief	'the Palace'– Luisa Miller, Theatre de la Monnaie	
1980s	1982	Designer	table top for Biennale des Antiquaires, Paris.	
1980s	1982	Designer of miniature sets, creation of animated figures	The Nightingale (film) by Christine Edzard for Sands Films, London	
1980s	1983	Mask creator, set and costume design	Sortilèges by Alfredo Arias and Kado Kostzer.	
1980s	1983	Interior design	New York apartment	
1980s	1984–1985	Costume and set design work	inaugural exhibition – Musee des Arts de la Mode et du Costume, Paris	
1980s	1985	Set models, parrot sculpture	Christine Edzard's film Little Dorrit, London	
1980s	1986–1987	Designer	decorative panels and hangings for villa entrance and staircase – Madrid	
1980s		Designer	canvas panels, including “a band of Grotesques”, bed cover and panels for a villa – Los Angeles.	
1980s	1987	Designer	Wall decorations and panels for a drawing room – Place Iena, Paris	

== Awards ==
Year	Title		Directed by	Award	Category	
1966	The Taming of the Shrew	film	Franco Zeffirelli	Nastro d'Argento Award	Best Costume Design	Winner
				Academy Award	Best Costume Design	Nominated
1980	Heartaches of a Pussycat	play	Alfredo Arias	Broadway World's Drama Desk Award	Outstanding Costume Design	Nominated
