= Old Ways New Ways =

British film

- Old Ways New Ways DVD cover
- Directed by: Olivier Stockman
- Produced by: Trevor Ingman
- Cinematography: John Fletcher
- Production company: Sands Films
- Distributed by: Squirrel Films
- Release date: 1988
- Running time: 48 minutes
- Country: United Kingdom
- Language: English

Old Ways New Ways is a 1988 documentary film about the Peek Freans biscuit factory in Bermondsey and its closing down in the late 1980s. The film also looks back at nearly 100 years of the factory's life. Directed by Olivier Stockman and produced by Trevor Ingman at Sands Films Studios in London, with cinematography by John Fletcher.

== Production ==
The film was made as the factory in Bermondsey was slowly closing down in 1988 and is told entirely by the employees of the plant. It contrasts the "old way of making biscuits" with the "new way of the factory about to close down". Peek Frean & Company was one of the first mass producers of biscuits and invented the household favourites Garibaldi and Bourbon, and, more recently, snacks such as Cheeselets and Twiglets.

The DVD was digitally remastered and re-issued in 2005, in time for the 100th anniversary of the 1906 black and white documentary film about the factory - A Visit to Peek Frean and Co.'s Biscuit Works, directed by G. H. Cricks and H. M. Sharp.

Sands Films, the production company that made the film, is owned and run by Christine Edzard, the screenwriter and director, and her husband Richard B. Goodwin.
