= Pas de légumes =

Pas de légumes is a ballet created in 1982 with choreography by Frederick Ashton, to the music of Rossini arranged by John Dalby.

The ballet originated as part of a 1979 EMI film Stories from a Flying Trunk, directed by Christine Edzard and produced by Richard B Goodwin, and adapted from Hans Christian Andersen's folk tales (this one being Little Ida’s Flowers). A mock-heroic episode in the film where a potato, the lowest of the vegetables, fulfils his ambition to dance with a gorgeous princess is replaced on stage by a traditional pas de deux for a fairytale prince and princess.

The music is taken from the operas Mosè in Egitto, Otello, and Le siège de Corinthe by Rossini. The title is a pun on the departure of Covent Garden flower, fruit and vegetable market from its traditional site in 1978 ('Vegetable step' – 'No vegetables'). (The Royal Ballet's home was the adjacent Royal Opera House.)

In the original film, the vegetables were played by dancers of the Royal Ballet. The ballet Pas de légumes was first performed by Sadler's Wells Royal Ballet at Sadler's Wells Theatre, on 20 May 1982 with the extravagant costumes designed by Rostislav Doboujinsky.

The characters (given French names) are :

- (Six) Oignons (onions)
- Choufleur (cauliflower)
- Choux rouge (red cabbage)
- (Two) Petits pois (peas)
- (Two) Artichaux (artichokes)
- (Two) Broccolis
- (Three) Laitues (lettuce)
- (Two) Tomates (tomatoes)
- (Three) Céleris (celery)
- Le Prince et la Princesse des Légumes (Prince and Princess of Vegetables)

With the cast dressed as vegetables, Ashton's choreography is described as "wittily graphic… at its best, the ballet shows the Chardinesque Ashton at work, making something out of nothing". He provides chaine turns "that plump out the crinoline of Choux Rouge" and a "curly flourish of the arms that mimics the heads of celeris".
