= John Tordoff =

English actor

- Born: 1938 (age 87–88)
- Occupation: Actor

John Tordoff (born 1938) is a retired English actor, a founding member of The Actors Company and an artist.

== Theatre ==
At the age of eighteen, Tordoff won the Viscountess Northcliffe Scholarship to RADA, graduating in 1957. This was followed by seasons in repertory at Oldham, Colchester and Harrogate. In 1963, he joined the company at the newly built Nottingham Playhouse under John Neville, appearing there for two seasons. There followed seasons at the Regent's Park Open Air Theatre and the Royal Lyceum Theatre, Edinburgh. In 1970, he appeared at the Mermaid Theatre, London as the Dauphin, Charles VII in Saint Joan. After a season at the Chichester Festival Theatre under John Clements, in 1972, he became a founding member of The Actors Company along with Ian McKellen and Edward Petherbridge, appearing in many of their productions including the 1973 show, Ruling the Roost and the 1974 tour of The Way of the World as Witwoud.

In 1974, he returned to the Mermaid Theatre in George Bernard Shaw's play Misalliance, for which he won the Clarence Derwent Award for the best supporting performance on the London stage in that year. In 1976, he appeared as Capulet in the Dolphin Theatre Company's production of Romeo & Juliet, and the 1977 St Georgian Elizabethean Trust adaptation of The Merchant of Venice as the Prince of Arragon. Further stage appearances were in Betzi at the Theatre Royal Haymarket, the 1980 season at the Old Vic with Peter O'Toole as Macbeth and The School for Scandal with Donald Sinden at the Duke of York's and subsequent European tour. In 1983, he created a one-man show out of Joseph Conrad's Heart of Darkness.

As a theatre director, he has taken two shows to the Edinburgh Festival - Reynard the Fox in 1985 (also shown at the Young Vic) and One Fine Day in 1986.

== Film ==
Tordoff made many appearances in films, including:

- Jesus of Nazareth
- Billy Liar
- Little Dorrit
- Stories from a Flying Trunk
- Without a Clue
- Great Balls of Fire!
- Robin Hood: Prince of Thieves
- Parting Shots.

== Television ==
Tordoff's first major TV work was the recurring role of Beckett in the 1969 BBC mini series The First Churchills. He appeared as Hippolyte in the 1975 BBC production of Madame Bovary. Also in 1975 he appeared in The Sweeney episode Supersnout in which he played Joey Stickley, a dirty and weaselly informant who conspires to ruin the reputation of Detective Chief Inspector Stephen Quirk of the Metropolitan Police Flying Squad.

Tordoff appeared in two episodes of the BBC Television Shakespeare series, the 1978 release Julius Caesar as Cinna the Poet and the 1979 release The Second Part of King Henry the Fourth containing his Death: and the Coronation of King Henry the Fifth as Frances Feeble. He appeared as Ronald Crawshaw in the three-part episode Two Thousand Witnesses of ITV's Crown Court. He appeared as Grafton Parker in the 1978 episode Paying Guests of the Granada Television series Strangers.

Tordoff had a recurring role as policeman Brian Tofkin in the John Sullivan comedy Citizen Smith. He appeared in the 1981 episode of the Granada Television series Lady Killers, titled "A Boy's Best Friend" as Mr. Fairfax. He appeared in the 1982 episode of Minder Rembrandt Doesn't Live Here Anymore as Max. He returned to the show as a shop assistant in the 1989 episode Fiddler on the Hoof. He has appeared in Coronation Street in three different roles, firstly as Arnold in episode 807 on 16 September 1968, photographer Norman Hill for episodes 1836 and 1837 in August 1978 and as Keith Hesketh in three appearances (episodes 4673 to 4675) in 1999.

Other appearances include Doctor Who as Alec Leeson in the 6-part serial Colony in Space, Catweazle, Rumpole of the Bailey (episode Rumpole and the Heavy Brigade), Sherlock Holmes American TV movie Hands of a murderer, The Gaffer (episode There Goes the Bride), Sharpe's Siege and Merlin.

Tordoff also wrote the TV drama Charlie Was a Rich Man, which was produced by Granada Television in 1980.

== Later life ==
While Tordoff was acting he took training in art at London's City Lit and Morley Colleges.

Since retiring from acting Tordoff has concentrated on gardening and painting. In the 1990s he created a prizewinning garden at Navarino Road, Hackney, where he was then living. It won the 1996 BBC Gardeners World competition for the best small garden in Britain. This garden continues to be open to the public under its present owners, through the National Garden Scheme.

In 2004, he moved with his partner Maurice Reeve, to Umbria, Italy; creating a second, far larger garden. In 2010, he and Maurice sold the Hackney house and moved to Cambridge, where he created a courtyard garden, which won the third prize in the Gardeners World Magazine competition for 2018.

In 2005, Tordoff exhibited a solo exhibition at the Barbican Estate, working in mixed media collages. He was elected a member of the Cambridge Drawing Society and exhibits regularly with the Cambridge gallery Byard Art. In 2016 his work was chosen to be shown at Art Fair East.

Tordoff founded LGBT Mature in 2018, a group to help support older members of the LGBT community in Cambridge.

In 2023, Tordoff was shortlisted for the Art - Experienced Amateur category in the King Lear Prizes.
