= Celia Bannerman =

English actress and director (born 1944)

Celia Bannerman (born 3 June 1944) is an English actress and director.

== Career ==
Celia Bannerman was born at Abingdon, Oxfordshire, and trained at the London Drama Centre. She started her professional career with Ralph Richardson as Dolly in Bernard Shaw's You Never Can Tell and Lucy in Sheridan's The Rivals followed by Cecily in The Importance of Being Earnest at the Theatre Royal Haymarket, London. At the Royal Shakespeare Company she played Lady Anne in Richard III, Katherine in Perkin Warbeck, Mrs Galy Gay in Man Is Man, and much later, Phebe in As You Like It (2023).

She played a number of major television roles early on in her acting career, notably Elizabeth Bennet in Pride and Prejudice (1967), Cecily in The Importance of Being Earnest and Lady Diana Newbury in Upstairs, Downstairs.

She starred in the films The Tamarind Seed (1974), Biddy (1983) for which she received an award from the Moscow Film Festival, Little Dorrit (1987) and The Land Girls (1998).

Bannerman was Associate Director at the Bristol Old Vic directing The Price, Translations, Quartermaine's Terms, The White Devil, Good Fun and La Ronde. At Stratford East she directed Sleeping Beauty and The Proposal. She was the Staff Director at the Royal National Theatre on The Passion, Larkrise, Fruits of Enlightenment and Strife. She also devised and directed a programme of erotic poetry called Making Love, and was the first woman to direct a play at the National Theatre, Lies in Plastic Smiles devised by the company and written by Gawn Grainger. In the West End she directed September Tide at the Comedy Theatre, A Midsummer Night's Dream at the Open Air Theatre, Regent's Park, Jack and the Beanstalk at the Shaw Theatre and three world premieres: Beached, Sinners and Saints and Bet Noir at the New Vic and Warehouse Theatre.

Bannerman has a long association with Sands Films, starting by playing the title character Biddy in Christine Edzard's film Biddy followed by setting up Edzard's first big feature film Little Dorrit and casting the 200 actors. Little Dorrit was nominated for two Oscars and won the LA Film Critics Award. Also for Sands Films she cast The Fool, As You Like It and A Dangerous Man: Lawrence After Arabia which won an Emmy for Best Drama.

She has been a dialect coach and a children's acting coach on several movies including Seven Years in Tibet, Two Brothers, The Boy in the Striped Pyjamas and Nanny McPhee.

In September 2025, Bannerman was cast as one of the 'Mermaids of Manningtree' in the upcoming film The Man with the Plan about the Beveridge Report, directed by Christine Edzard for Sands Films.

== Family ==
Bannerman is married to Edward Klein. Her parents were Hugh Bannerman and Hilda Bannerman, née Diamond. Her brother is Julian Bannerman.

== Filmography ==
Year	Title	Role	Notes
1974	The Tamarind Seed	Rachel Paterson	
1983	Biddy	Biddy	
1987	Little Dorrit	The Milliner	
1992	As You Like It	Celia	
1998	The Land Girls	District Commissioner	
2026	The Man with the Plan	a Mermaid of Manningtree	

== Television ==
Year	Film	Role	Notes
1965	Object Z	Diana Winters	6 episodes
1967	Blandings Castle	Jane	Episode: "Lord Emsworth and the Crime Wave at Blandings"
1967	Pride and Prejudice	Elizabeth Bennet	6 episodes
1968	Thirty-Minute Theatre	The Actress	Episode: "The Bishop and The Actress"
1969	W. Somerset Maugham	Iris Maitland	Episode: "Louise"
1969	Albert!	Lucy	Episode: "The Good Samaritan"
1970	Vile Bodies	Nina Blount	TV movie
1971	ITV Sunday Night Theatre	Sue Quarry	Episode: "Tales of Piccadilly: The Way Out"
1971	Crime of Passion	Agathe Bernois	Episode: "Justine"
1972	Armchair Theatre	Miss Arrowroot	Episode: "The Folk Singer"
1973	The Rivals of Sherlock Holmes	Milly Revell	Episode: "The Missing Q.C.s"
1973	Upstairs, Downstairs	Diana Newbury/Lady Diana Russell	4 episodes
1974	Play of the Month	Cecily Cardew	Episode: "The Importance of Being Earnest"
1974	Affairs of the Heart	Cora Prodmore	Episode: "Grace"
1975	Ten From the Twenties	Grace Peddley	Episode: "Two or Three Graces"
1975	Shades of Greene	The Girl	Episode: "The Invisible Japanese Gentleman"
1977	Wings	Kate Gaylion	4 episodes
1982	For the Love of Egypt	Kate Bradbury	TV movie
1982	Chronicle	Kate Bradbury	Episode: "For the Love of Egypt"
1985	Victoria Wood: As Seen on TV	Pippa	Episode #1.4
1988	Screenplay	Mrs. Ansell	Episode: "No Further Cause for Concern"
1992	Performance	Miss Potter	Episode: "After the Dance"
2006	Bad Girls	Mrs. Fisk	Episode #8.8
2007	Hindenburg: The Untold Story	Margaret Mather	TV movie documentary
2014	14 Tagebücher des Ersten Weltkriegs	Sarah Macnaughtan	2 episodes
