= Murder on the Orient Express (1974 film) =

1974 British mystery film by Sidney Lumet

- Original British quad format film poster
- Directed by: Sidney Lumet
- Screenplay by: Paul Dehn
- Based on: Murder on the Orient Express; 1934 novel by Agatha Christie
- Produced by: John Brabourne; Richard Goodwin
- Starring: Albert Finney; Lauren Bacall; Martin Balsam; Ingrid Bergman; Jacqueline Bisset; Jean-Pierre Cassel; Sean Connery; John Gielgud; Wendy Hiller; Anthony Perkins; Vanessa Redgrave; Rachel Roberts; Richard Widmark; Michael York; George Coulouris; Denis Quilley; Colin Blakely
- Cinematography: Geoffrey Unsworth
- Edited by: Anne V. Coates
- Music by: Richard Rodney Bennett
- Production companies: G.W. Films Limited; EMI Films
- Distributed by: Anglo-EMI Film Distributors
- Release date: 21 November 1974 (UK)
- Running time: 128 minutes
- Country: United Kingdom
- Language: English
- Budget: $1.4 million
- Box office: $37.7 million

Murder on the Orient Express is a 1974 British mystery film directed by Sidney Lumet, produced by John Brabourne and Richard Goodwin, and based on the 1934 novel of the same name by Agatha Christie.

The film has an all-star cast, and features the Belgian detective Hercule Poirot (Albert Finney), who is asked by a railway director (Martin Balsam) to investigate the murder of an American business tycoon (Richard Widmark) aboard the Orient Express train. The various suspects are portrayed by Lauren Bacall, Ingrid Bergman, Sean Connery, John Gielgud, Jean-Pierre Cassel, Vanessa Redgrave, Michael York, Rachel Roberts, Jacqueline Bisset, Anthony Perkins, Denis Quilley, Colin Blakely, and Wendy Hiller. The screenplay is by Paul Dehn.

The film was a commercial and critical success. Bergman won the Academy Award for Best Supporting Actress, and the film received five other nominations at the 47th Academy Awards: Best Actor (Finney), Best Adapted Screenplay, Best Original Score, Best Cinematography, and Best Costume Design.

== Plot ==
In 1930, toddler Daisy Armstrong, daughter of British Army Colonel Hamish Armstrong and his American wife Sonia, is kidnapped and murdered.

In December 1935, Hercule Poirot travels from Istanbul to London on the Orient Express. His old friend, Signor Bianchi, a director of the company that owns the rail line, arranges Poirot's accommodation after all the first-class compartments are unusually sold out during the off-season. Other passengers include American socialite Harriet Belinda Hubbard; English governess Mary Debenham; Swedish missionary Greta Ohlsson; American businessman Samuel Ratchett, with his secretary/translator Hector McQueen and English valet Edward Beddoes; Italian-American car salesman Antonio "Gino" Foscarelli; elderly Russian Princess Natalia Dragomiroff and her German maid Hildegarde Schmidt; Hungarian Count Rudolf Andrenyi and his wife Elena; British Army Colonel John Arbuthnott; and American theatrical agent Cyrus B. Hardman.

The day after the train's departure, Ratchett requests to hire Poirot as a bodyguard as he has received death threats, but Poirot declines despite a very generous fee. When the train stops in Belgrade, Bianchi gives Poirot his compartment and shares a coach with Greek physician Stavros Constantine. During the night, a snowdrift in Yugoslavia strands the train, while Poirot is awakened by a moan from Ratchett's compartment. Conductor Pierre Michel is told through the door that it was just a nightmare. Ratchett is dead the next morning; drugged and stabbed twelve times.

Poirot finds a charred letter fragment revealing Ratchett's true identity: American gangster Lanfranco Cassetti, who along with an accomplice, had carried out Daisy Armstrong's kidnapping and murder. Cassetti had betrayed his accomplice and fled the country with the ransom money. Mrs. Armstrong then died giving premature birth to a stillborn baby, and Colonel Armstrong committed suicide. A French maidservant Paulette, suspected of complicity in the kidnapping, also committed suicide before being found innocent. Bianchi feels that there is justice in Cassetti's death.

Poirot finds Cassetti's broken watch showing 1:15, and concludes that Cassetti was murdered at that time when the moaning was heard. Hubbard says that she found a Wagon-Lit conductor's button in her compartment and a bloodied knife in her makeup bag. Foscarelli says that he knew Cassetti was "Mafioso", and theorizes that he was killed in a Mafia feud.

Interviewing Pierre and the passengers individually, Poirot learns McQueen is the son of the District Attorney from the kidnapping case and knew Mrs. Armstrong; Beddoes was a British Army batman; Greta Ohlsson has been to America; Countess Andrenyi's maiden name is Grünwald (German for "Greenwood", Mrs. Armstrong's maiden name); Conductor Pierre's daughter died five years earlier of scarlet fever; Colonel Arbuthnott and Miss Debenham will marry once he has divorced his philandering wife; and Princess Dragomiroff was Sonia's godmother. He also learns that the Armstrong household had a butler, a secretary, a cook, a chauffeur, and a nursemaid. Poirot tricks Schmidt into revealing she had been a cook. Foscarelli denies having been a chauffeur, while Hardman claims to actually be Cassetti's bodyguard.

Poirot assembles the suspects and describes two solutions to the murder: the first that Cassetti's murder was a Mafia revenge killing - someone disguised as a Wagon-Lit conductor entered the train at Belgrade and later stabbed Cassetti, discarded the dagger in Hubbard's makeup bag, then escaped when the train was stopped by the snowdrift. Bianchi and Dr. Constantine reject this scenario as absurd, but Poirot says they might reconsider that opinion.

The second solution links together all the suspects. In addition to the incriminating revelations Poirot extracted from Hardman, McQueen, Schmidt, and the Princess, Poirot deduces that:

- Countess Andrenyi is Mrs. Armstrong's younger sister, Helena
- Debenham was the Armstrongs' secretary
- Beddoes was the Armstrongs' butler
- Ohlsson was Daisy's nursemaid
- Arbuthnott was Colonel Armstrong's close friend
- Foscarelli was the Armstrongs’ chauffeur
- Pierre was Paulette's father
- Hardman was not Cassetti's bodyguard, as Ratchett had tried to hire Poirot for that job. He was actually a former policeman who had fallen in love with Paulette.
- Hubbard is revealed to be Linda Arden, mother of Sonia Armstrong and Helena Andrenyi, and the organizer of this "extraordinary revenge".

McQueen drugged Cassetti, allowing the conspirators to execute him jointly, each with a stab to the chest totalling 12, the Andrenyis stabbing Cassetti together. They killed Cassetti at 2:00 am while Poirot was asleep. The moan and broken watch were to convince Poirot that the murder occurred at a time when the suspects had alibis.

Poirot asks Bianchi to choose one solution before the train is freed from the snowdrift, saying the Yugoslav police would probably prefer the simpler first solution of the Mafia feud. Bianchi chooses the first scenario. Dr. Constantine and Poirot concur, although Poirot struggles with his conscience. The snowdrift is cleared and the train resumes its journey.

== Cast ==
- Albert Finney as Hercule Poirot
- Lauren Bacall as Mrs. Harriet Belinda Hubbard/Linda Arden
- Martin Balsam as Bianchi
- Ingrid Bergman as Greta Ohlsson
- Jacqueline Bisset as Countess Helena Andrenyi
- Jean-Pierre Cassel as Pierre Paul Michel
- Sean Connery as Lt. Colonel John Arbuthnott, British Indian Army
- John Gielgud as Edward Beddoes
- Wendy Hiller as Princess Natalia Dragomiroff
- Anthony Perkins as Hector McQueen
- Vanessa Redgrave as Mary Debenham
- Rachel Roberts as Hildegarde Schmidt
- Richard Widmark as Ratchett/Lanfranco Cassetti
- Michael York as Count Rudolf Andrenyi
- Colin Blakely as Cyrus B. Hardman
- George Coulouris as Dr. Stavros Constantine
- Denis Quilley as Antonio "Gino" Foscarelli
- Vernon Dobtcheff as Concierge
- Jeremy Lloyd as A.D.C.
- John Moffatt as Chief Attendant

== Production ==
=== Development ===
Dame Agatha Christie had been quite displeased with some film adaptations of her works made in the 1960s, and accordingly was unwilling to sell any more film rights. When Nat Cohen, chairman of EMI Films, and producer John Brabourne attempted to get her approval for this film, they felt it necessary to have Lord Mountbatten of Burma (of the British royal family and also Brabourne's father-in-law) help them broach the subject. In the end, according to Christie's husband, Sir Max Mallowan, "Agatha herself has always been allergic to the adaptation of her books by the cinema, but was persuaded to give a rather grudging appreciation to this one." According to one report, Christie gave approval because she liked the previous films of the producers, Romeo and Juliet and Tales of Beatrix Potter.

=== Casting ===
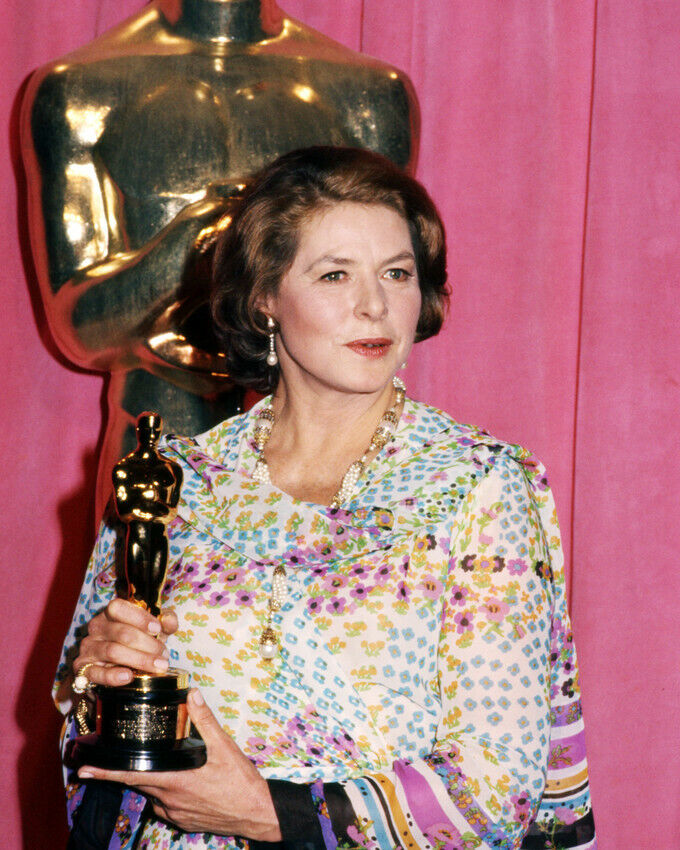
Ingrid Bergman received her third Academy Award for her performance in Murder on the Orient Express

Christie's biographer Gwen Robyns quoted her as saying, "It was well made except for one mistake. It was Albert Finney, as my detective Hercule Poirot. I wrote that he had the finest mustache in England — but he didn't in the film. I thought that a pity—why shouldn't he?"

Cast members eagerly accepted upon first being approached. Lumet went to Sean Connery first, who admitted that he had been "stupidly flattered" by Lumet saying that if you get the biggest star, the rest will come along. Bergman was initially offered the role of Princess Dragomiroff, but instead requested to play Greta Ohlsson. Lumet said:

She had chosen a small part, and I couldn't persuade her to change her mind. She was sweetly stubborn. But stubborn she was ... Since her part was so small, I decided to film her one big scene, where she talks for almost five minutes, straight, all in one long take. A lot of actresses would have hesitated over that. She loved the idea and made the most of it. She ran the gamut of emotions. I've never seen anything like it.

Bergman won an Academy Award for Best Supporting Actress for the portrayal.

The entire budget was provided by EMI. The cost of the cast came to £554,100.

=== Filming ===
Unsworth shot the film with Panavision cameras. Interiors were filmed at Elstree Studios. Exterior shooting was mostly done in France in 1973, with a railway workshop near Paris standing in for Istanbul station. The scenes of the train proceeding through Central Europe were filmed in the Jura Mountains on the then-recently closed railway line from Pontarlier to Gilley, with the scenes of the train stuck in snow being filmed in a cutting near Montbenoît. There were concerns about a lack of snow in the weeks preceding the scheduled shooting of the snowbound train, and plans were made to truck in large quantities of snow at considerable expense. However, heavy snowfall the night before the shooting made the extra snow unnecessary—just as well, as the snow-laden backup trucks had themselves become stuck in the snow.

=== Music ===
Richard Rodney Bennett's Orient Express theme has been reworked into an orchestral suite and performed and recorded several times. It was performed on the original soundtrack album by the Orchestra of the Royal Opera House, Covent Garden under Marcus Dods. The piano soloist was the composer himself.

== Reception ==
=== Box office ===
Murder on the Orient Express was released theatrically in the UK on 22 November 1974 and in the USA on 24 November 1974. Paramount Pictures handled the films North American release. The film was a success at the box office, given its tight budget of $1.4 million, earning $36 million in North America, making it the 11th highest-grossing film of 1974. Nat Cohen claimed it was the first film completely financed by a British company to make the top of the weekly US box office charts in Variety. The movie - which was Cohen's idea - is considered one of the great triumphs of his career. The success of the movie prompted the Rank Organisation to re-enter the filmmaking space.

=== Critical response ===
On Rotten Tomatoes the film holds an approval rating of 89% based on 46 reviews. The website's critics consensus reads, "Murder, intrigue, and a star-studded cast make this stylish production of Murder on the Orient Express one of the best Agatha Christie adaptations to see the silver screen." On Metacritic it has a weighted average score of 63 out of 100, based on 8 critics, indicating "generally favorable reviews".

Roger Ebert gave the film three stars out of four, writing that it "provides a good time, high style, a loving salute to an earlier period of filmmaking". The New York Times's chief critic of the era, Vincent Canby, wrote

[...] had Dame Agatha Christie's Murder on the Orient Express been made into a movie 40 years ago (when it was published here as Murder on the Calais Coach), it would have been photographed in black-and-white on a back lot in Burbank or Culver City, with one or two stars and a dozen character actors and studio contract players. Its running time would have been around 67 minutes and it could have been a very respectable B-picture. Murder on the Orient Express wasn't made into a movie 40 years ago, and after you see the Sidney Lumet production that opened yesterday at the Coronet, you may be both surprised and glad it wasn't. An earlier adaptation could have interfered with plans to produce this terrifically entertaining super-valentine to a kind of whodunit that may well be one of the last fixed points in our inflationary universe.

=== Agatha Christie ===
Christie, who died fourteen months after the release of the film, stated that Murder on the Orient Express and Witness for the Prosecution were the only movie adaptations of her books that she liked although she expressed disappointment with Poirot (Finney)'s moustache, which was far from the fabulous hirsute creation she had detailed in her mysteries.

== Awards and nominations ==
Year	Award ceremony	Category	Nominee	Result
2005	Satellite Awards	Best Classic DVD	Murder on the Orient Express	Nominated
1976	Grammy Awards	Album of Best Original Score; Written for a Motion Picture or a Television Special	Richard Rodney Bennett	Nominated
1975	Academy Awards	Best Actor	Albert Finney	Nominated
1975	Academy Awards	Best Supporting Actress	Ingrid Bergman	Won
1975	Academy Awards	Best Adapted Screenplay	Paul Dehn	Nominated
1975	Academy Awards	Best Cinematography	Geoffrey Unsworth	Nominated
1975	Academy Awards	Best Costume Design	Tony Walton	Nominated
1975	Academy Awards	Best Original Score	Richard Rodney Bennett	Nominated
1975	BAFTA Awards	Best Film	John Brabourne, Richard Goodwin	Nominated
1975	BAFTA Awards	Best Actor	Albert Finney	Nominated
1975	BAFTA Awards	Best Direction	Sidney Lumet	Nominated
1975	BAFTA Awards	Best Supporting Actor	John Gielgud	Won
1975	BAFTA Awards	Best Supporting Actress	Ingrid Bergman	Won
1975	BAFTA Awards	Best Cinematography	Geoffrey Unsworth	Nominated
1975	BAFTA Awards	Best Editing	Anne V. Coates	Nominated
1975	BAFTA Awards	Anthony Asquith Award for Film Music	Richard Rodney Bennett	Won
1975	BAFTA Awards	Best Production Design	Tony Walton	Nominated
1975	BAFTA Awards	Best Costume Design	Tony Walton	Nominated
1975	Directors Guild of America Awards	Outstanding Directorial Achievement in Motion Pictures	Sidney Lumet	Nominated
1975	Edgar Award	Best Motion Picture Screenplay	Paul Dehn	Nominated
1975	Evening Standard British Film Awards	Best Film	Sidney Lumet	Won
1975	Evening Standard British Film Awards	Best Actor	Albert Finney	Won
1975	Evening Standard British Film Awards	Best Actress	Wendy Hiller	Won
1975	Writers' Guild of Great Britain Awards	Best British Screenplay	Paul Dehn	Won
1974	National Board of Review Awards	Top Ten Films	Murder on the Orient Express	Won

== See also ==
- "Murder on the Orient Express" (2010) episode of Agatha Christie's Poirot
- Murder on the Orient Express (2017 film), directed by and starring Kenneth Branagh
