= Graham Seed =

British actor (born 1950)

Graham Seed (born 12 July 1950 in Godalming) is an English actor.

== Education ==
Seed was born on 12 July 1950. He was educated at Charterhouse School, an independent boarding school in the market town of Godalming, in Surrey, followed by RADA in London.

== Career ==
Seed is best known for playing Nigel Pargetter in the BBC Radio series The Archers from 1983 until January 2011, although actor Nigel Carrington briefly played the role when Seed took a break in the late 1980s. Seed appeared in the well-known "Is it on the Trolley?" sketch, alongside Victoria Wood (its author) and Duncan Preston in the series Victoria Wood: As Seen on TV.

After his character's death in The Archers in 2011, Seed played himself as the villain in a Radio 4 pantomime who plans to bring down Radio 4 by releasing the Pips but ultimately falls to his death while retrieving a banner, paralleling his Archers character. In addition to The Archers, Seed has appeared in the TV soap operas Brookside (1995–97, as Dick Thornton), Coronation Street (1981, as a solicitor), and Crossroads (1985–88, as Charlie Mycroft).

Seed's roles include the teenage Britannicus, son of the emperor Claudius in the BBC adaptation of Robert Graves' I, Claudius (1976), Harrop in William Boyd's Channel 4 Film Good and Bad at Games (1983) and Jorkins in the first episode "Et in Arcadia ego" of the Granada Television television adaptation of Brideshead Revisited (1981). He also appeared in ATV's Edward the Seventh (1975), Bergerac (1981), C.A.B. (1986) Midsomer Murders (2009) and Wild Target (2010).

In September 2025 Seed was cast as 'Mr Everyman / The voice of the Fly' in the forthcoming film The Man with the Plan about the Beveridge Report, directed by Christine Edzard.

== Personal life ==
Seed and his first wife, Claire Colvin, were parents to theatre producer Nicola and jazz guitarist Toby (1988–2018). In 2013 Seed married theatre producer Denise Silvey.

== Filmography ==
- Gandhi (1982) – Wicket-keeper
