= Amelda Brown =

British actress

Amelda Brown is a British actress of stage, film, and television. She trained at the Royal Academy of Dramatic Art, graduating in 1980, and became known for her work in fringe theatre.

She played leading roles in the premieres of Caryl Churchill's Fen (1983) and A Mouthful of Birds (1986) as well as appearing in leading roles in revivals of Churchill's Light Shining in Buckinghamshire at the Royal National Theatre (1996) and Heart's Desire at the Orange Tree Theatre (2016). Her other stage roles have included Lady Macbeth for the Royal National Theatre's 1989 US tour of Macbeth; Maudlin in A Chaste Maid in Cheapside at Shakespeare's Globe in 1997; and Gibb in the 2014 world premiere of Tim Crouch's Adler and Gibb at the Royal Court theatre.

Amongst her television roles are Brenda Parkin in Backup, Mrs. Roach in Soldier Soldier, Pauline Cook in A Touch of Frost, and Sue Barnes in Peak Practice, and she has also appeared in The Adventures of Sherlock Holmes, Inspector Morse, The Bill, Lovejoy, Holby City, The Story of Tracy Beaker, and Doctors.

In 2009, she appeared in the film Harry Potter and the Half-Blood Prince as Mrs. Cole. Her other film work includes Fanny in Little Dorrit (1987), and the small roles of Hope in Hope and Glory (1987) and the Visitor in Sister My Sister (1994).

In September 2025, Amelda was cast as 'Wendy Warbler' in the upcoming film The Man with the Plan about the Beveridge Report, directed by Christine Edzard.
