= Pride and Prejudice (1967 TV series) =

1967 British television drama series

- Radio Times cover: Celia Bannerman & Lewis Fiander
- Based on: Pride and Prejudice by Jane Austen
- Written by: Nemone Lethbridge
- Directed by: Joan Craft
- Starring: Celia Bannerman; Lewis Fiander
- Country of origin: United Kingdom
- No. of series: 1
- No. of episodes: 6

Production
- Producer: Campbell Logan
- Running time: 25 minutes (per episode)

Original release
- Network: BBC One
- Release: 10 September – 15 October 1967

Pride and Prejudice is a 1967 BBC television six-part serial, based on Jane Austen's 1813 novel of the same name.

This production marked the 150th anniversary of the death of Jane Austen. It was directed by Joan Craft and starred Celia Bannerman and Lewis Fiander as the protagonists Elizabeth Bennet and Mr. Darcy.

This version omits the middle Bennet sister, Mary.

Unlike most of Craft's work for the BBC, the serial has survived intact. It is unavailable on home media, but can be found online. It is also the earliest television adaptation produced by the BBC to exist. The 55-minute teleplay from 1938, and the 1952 and 1958 serials, are all considered lost.

== Cast ==
- Celia Bannerman as Elizabeth Bennet
- Lewis Fiander as Mr. Darcy
- Michael Gough as Mr. Bennet
- Vivian Pickles as Mrs. Bennet
- Lucy Fleming as Lydia Bennet
- Sarah Taunton as Kitty Bennet
- Polly Adams as Jane Bennet
- Diana King as Lady Lucas
- Karin MacCarthy as Louisa Hurst
- David Savile as Mr. Bingley
- Georgina Ward as Caroline Bingley
- Robert Dorning as Sir William Lucas
- Richard Hampton as Mr. Wickham
- Vivian James as Mr. Hurst
- Sylvia Coleridge as Lady Catherine de Bourgh
- Hugh Cross as Mr. Gardiner
- Eithne Dunne as Mrs. Gardiner
- Kate Lansbury as Charlotte Lucas
- Julian Curry as Mr. Collins
- Steven Grives as Edward Lucas
- Maurice Quick as Servant
- Robin Chadwick as Colonel Fitzwilliam
- Hubert Hill as Servant
- Ralph Katterns as Servant
- Janette Legge as Miss Anne de Bourgh
- Tessa Wyatt as Georgiana Darcy

== Episodes ==
Original air dates:

1. "Neighbours" – 10 September 1967
2. "Pride" – 17 September 1967
3. "Proposal" – 24 September 1967
4. "Prejudice" – 1 October 1967
5. "Elopement" – 8 October 1967
6. "Destiny" – 15 October 1967
