= Simon Dormandy =

- Born: 13 December 1957 (age 68); England
- Occupations: Theatre director; teacher; actor

Simon Dormandy is an English theatre director, teacher and actor. As an actor, he worked with Cheek by Jowl and the Royal Shakespeare Company (RSC), as well as at The Donmar Warehouse, The Old Vic, Chichester Festival Theatre and The Royal Exchange, amongst many others. He is perhaps best known on screen for his performances in Little Dorrit and Vanity Fair. Between 1997 and 2012, he taught drama at Eton College, Berkshire, and held the posts of Director of Drama, Head of Theatre Studies and Deputy Head of English. He worked as a freelance theatre director until 2019 and has been Head of Academic Drama at St Paul's School, London since 2020. His directing credits include Julius Caesar at the Bristol Old Vic and Much Ado About Nothing at the Rose Theatre, Kingston, and his own adaptations of A Passage to India and the Coen Brothers' film The Hudsucker Proxy.

== Background ==
Simon Dormandy was born on 13 December 1957. He attended Marlborough College and studied English Language and Literature at Oxford University between 1976 and 1979. Dormandy studied with Philippe Gaulier at École Philippe Gaulier.

Simon Dormandy was, as an actor, known largely for his work with the Royal Shakespeare Company between 1988 and 1995. Over the period, he worked with many well known directors, including Adrian Noble, Sam Mendes, Deborah Warner, Katie Mitchell and Max Stafford-Clark. He also took part in several films and television series. He was perhaps best known for his performances in Little Dorrit (as Sparkler) and Vanity Fair (as Dobbin). He was also known for his work with the theatre company Cheek By Jowl.

He taught Drama and English at Eton College for fifteen years from 1997 to 2012, where he was Director of Drama, Head of Theatre Studies and Deputy Head of English. His pupils included the actors Tom Hiddleston, Eddie Redmayne, Harry Lloyd and Adetomiwa Edun, director James Dacre and comedians Tom Palmer and Tom Stourton of comedy duo Totally Tom and Humphrey Ker. School productions include Henry VI with Eddie Redmayne, Waiting for Godot with Harry Lloyd, King Lear (where he directed Edward Stourton's son in the title role), Three Sisters, Pool, No Water, Henry IV, (a joint version of both Henry IV, Part 1 and Henry IV, Part 2), Joseph K and Spring Awakening.

Since January 2013, he has been working as a freelance theatre director. In 2013, he was assistant director on the world premiere of The Low Road by Bruce Norris at The Royal Court Theatre. In 2014 he directed the UK Premiere of Eldorado by Marius von Mayenburg and a production of Waiting for Godot with young comedians in the leading roles, both at The Arcola Theatre in London. In 2015, he co-directed his own stage adaptation of the Coen Brothers' film The Hudsucker Proxy with Toby Sedgwick at the Nuffield Theatre, Southampton and the Liverpool Playhouse in association with Complicité. The production won Best Design at the 2015 UK Theatre Awards. He was also an artistic collaborator on Simon McBurney's The Encounter for Complicité at the Edinburgh International Festival and subsequently at the Barbican, London and on tour. In 2016, he directed Mel Giedroyc in the highly acclaimed UK Premiere of Luce by J. C. Lee at Southwark Playhouse. In 2017, he directed Julius Caesar at the Bristol Old Vic, and developed and co-directed his own adaptation of A Passage to India, which toured early in 2018 before a five-week run at The Park in London. His production of Much Ado About Nothing opened at the Rose Theatre, Kingston in April 2018.

He returned to teaching in 2019 at City of London Freemen's School and has served as Head of Academic Drama at St Paul's School, London since 2020. He also teaches and directs at Shakespeare's Globe, Royal Academy of Dramatic Art, Drama Centre, Royal Central School of Speech and Drama, and the British American Drama Academy.

== Filmography ==
=== Film credits ===
Year	Film	Role
1986	Whoops Apocalypse	Soldier
1986	Castaway	Jackson
1988	Little Dorrit	Sparkler
1992	Rebecca's Daughters	Captain Marsden
1992	Christopher Columbus: The Discovery	Bives

=== Television credits ===
Year	TV	Role	Notes
1987	Boogie Outlaws		TV mini-series
1987	Vanity Fair	William Dobbin	TV mini-series
1989	Casualty	Tom	TV show 1 episode
1996	Bugs	Zito	TV show 2 episodes

== Selected stage appearances ==
=== Non-Royal Shakespeare Company ===
- Death and the King's Horsemen, Royal Exchange, 1990 (dir. Phyllida Lloyd)
- Adam Was a Gardener, Minerva Studio, Chichester, 1991
- Losing Venice (Traverse Theatre, Edinburgh 1992)
- The Threepenny Opera (Donmar Warehouse, London, 1994)

=== With the Royal Shakespeare Company ===
All Royal Shakespeare Company performances taken from the Shakespeare Birthplace Trust archive history

==== 1988 ====
- Much Ado About Nothing (Royal Shakespeare Theatre, Stratford-upon-Avon, April)
- Henry VI (Royal Shakespeare Theatre, Stratford-upon-Avon, October)
- Richard III (Royal Shakespeare Theatre, Stratford-upon-Avon, October)
- Edward IV (Royal Shakespeare Theatre, Stratford-upon-Avon, October)
- Stars in the Morning Sky The Other Place, Stratford-upon-Avon, December)

==== 1989 ====
- Henry VI (Theatre Royal, Newcastle-upon-Tyne, February)
- Edward IV (Theatre Royal, Newcastle-upon-Tyne, February)
- Richard III (Theatre Royal, Newcastle-upon-Tyne, February)
- Henry VI (Barbican Theatre, London, April)
- Richard III (Barbican Theatre, London, April)
- Edward IV (Barbican Theatre, London, April)
- King John (Pit, London, May)
- King John (Pit, London, May)
- Mary and Lizzie (Pit, London, September)
- Stars in the Morning Sky (Almeida Theatre, London, October)
- The Liar (Old Vic, London)

==== 1992 ====
- Richard III (The Other Place, Stratford-upon-Avon, August)
- Richard III (On tour, September)

==== 1993 ====
- Richard III (Swan Theatre, Stratford-upon-Avon, March
- King Lear (Royal Shakespeare Theatre, Stratford-upon-Avon, May)
- The Country Wife (Swan Theatre, Stratford-upon-Avon, August)

==== 1994 ====
- King Lear (Theatre Royal, Newcastle-upon-Tyne, February)
- The Country Wife (Newcastle Playhouse, Newcastle-upon-Tyne, February)
- King Lear (Barbican Theatre, London, May)
- The Country Wife (Pit, London, July)

==== 1995 ====
- Measure for Measure (Barbican Theatre, London, June)
- The Park (Pit, London, September)

== See also ==
- Eton College
- Royal Shakespeare Company
