= Érin Geraghty =

Irish actress (born 1955)

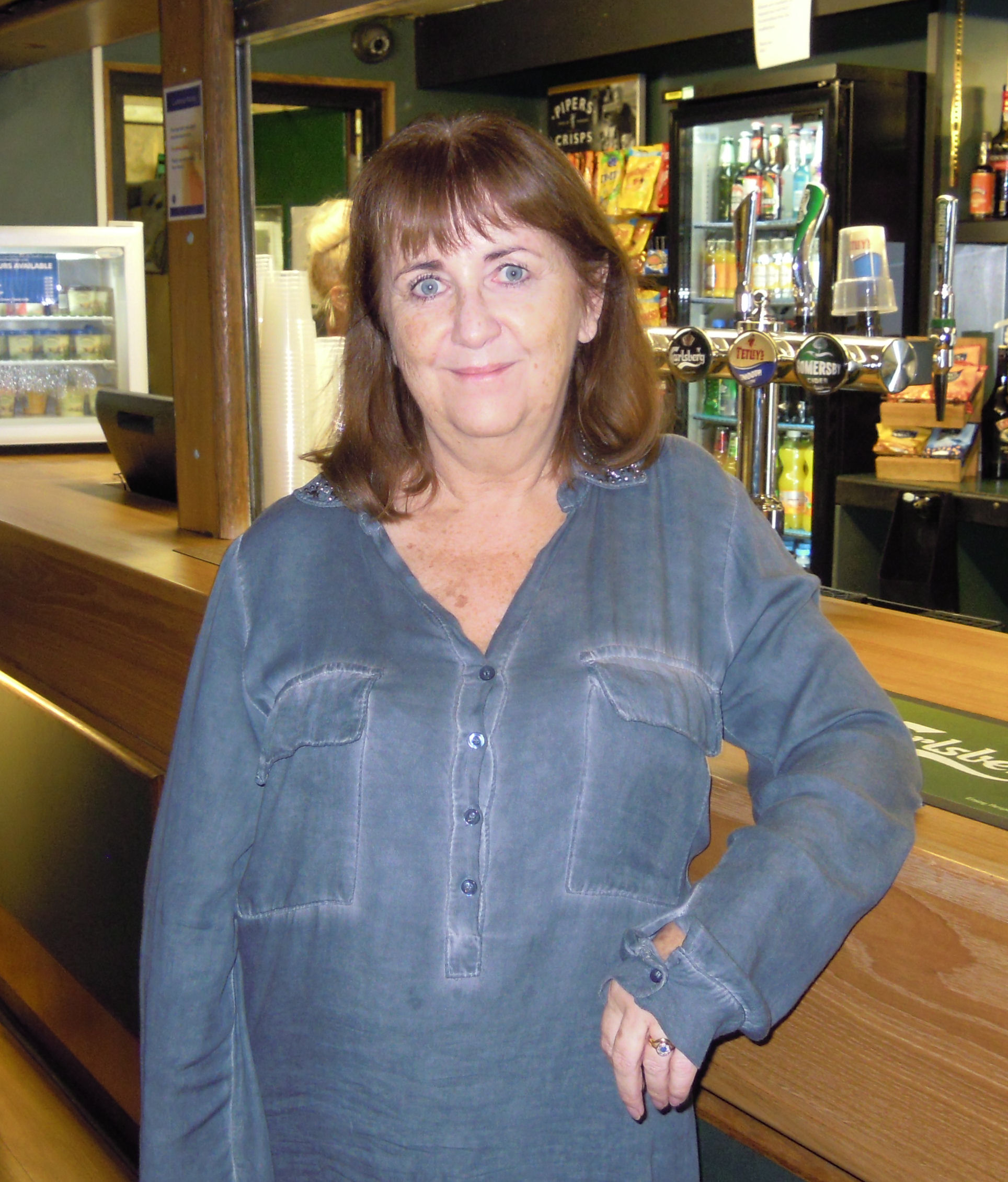
- Born: 1955 (age 70–71); Ireland
- Occupation: Actor
- Years active: 1968–present
- Spouse: Paul Lavers
- Website: eringeraghty.com

Érin Geraghty (born 1955) is an Irish film, television and stage actress whose career has spanned 50 years.

== Life and career ==
After a brief career as a child model in the 1960s, Geraghty attended the Italia Conti Academy of Theatre Arts (1967–69) before studying at Corona Academy of Theatre Arts (1969–1972). Geraghty made her first television appearances in 1968 as Michele in "The Corpse Can't Play" episode of Late Night Horror and as Sarah in the now lost "The Problem of Thor Bridge" episode of Sherlock Holmes starring Peter Cushing in the title role.

Other television appearances include Sal Turner in Z-Cars (1971); Jacquetta in Whack-O! (1972); Maureen Morahan in Angels (Series 1–3, 1975–76); Margaret MacAmnay in Churchill's People (1975); Florrie Bagster in Clayhanger (1976); Jane in Raffles (1977); Margaret Locke in Fox (1980); Iris in the TV biopic Florence Nightingale (1985); Sandra Marsh in EastEnders (1986); Mistress Goody the Hag in Knightmare (1990); Annie Jones in The Bill (1993); Vicar's wife in Last of the Summer Wine (2008); Nurse Scott in Mistresses (2010); Gail in Birds of a Feather (2015); and Diane Johnson in Yellow Jacket (2017), and Laura Evans in Doctors (2020).

Her film roles include the young Beatrix Potter in The Tales of Beatrix Potter (1971), Ducky in The Bunny Caper aka Sex Play (1974), and Joan in That'll Be the Day (1973).

Geraghty's stage career includes a wide range of roles, with Cam Fuller of The StarPhoenix describing her as "a renowned British actress with credits in everything from the Royal Shakespeare Company to Coronation Street". Geraghty's performance in A Time to Go Walking earned her an award for best female performer at the 2000 Orlando International Fringe Theater Festival. In 2014, Geraghty played Ellen Creed in the Victorian melodrama Ladies in Retirement at the Grand Theatre, Wolverhampton. In 2016, she played Annie Beck in a national tour of a stage adaptation of the popular television series Heartbeat; while in October that year she appeared opposite her husband Paul Lavers in a production of Bedroom Farce at the Gordon Craig Theatre in Stevenage. In 2017, she played Janet Widdington in Ladies in Lavender at the Theatre Royal, Windsor. The next year she played Nanny Price in Small Wonders at the Bernie Grant Arts Centre. Other stage roles include Mistress Ford in The Merry Wives of Windsor and Nurse in Romeo and Juliet.

== Filmography ==
=== Television ===
Year	Title	Role	Notes
1968	Late Night Horror	Michele	Episode: "The Corpse Can't Play"
1968	Sherlock Holmes	Sarah	Episode: "Thor Bridge"
1971	Z Cars	Sal Turner	2 episodes
1972	Whack-O!	Jacquetta	Episode: #8.11
1973	Play for Today	Angela	Episode: "Jingle Bells"
1975	Churchill's People	Margaret MacAmnay	Episode: "O Canada"
1976	Clayhanger	Florrie	6 episodes
1975–1976	Angels	Maureen Morahan	27 episodes
1977	Raffles	Jane	Episode: "Home Affairs"
1977	Murder Most English: A Flaxborough Chronicle	Hotel Maid	2 episodes
1980	The Pump	Hospital Sister	Television film
1980	Fox	Margaret Locke	2 episodes
1980	Leap in the Dark	Wendy	Episode: "Watching Me, Watching You"
1985	Florence Nightingale	Iris	Television film
1986	EastEnders	Staff Nurse Marsh	Episode: #1.157
1988	Small World	2nd Stewardess	Episode: "What Shall We Do Tomorrow?"
1990	The Chief	Fiona	6 episodes
1990	Knightmare	Mistress Goody	6 episodes
1991	Dodgem	Linda Leighton	3 episodes
1993	Unnatural Causes	TV Presenter	Television film
1993	The Bill	Annie Jones	Episode: "Double Enmity"
1994	Requiem Apache	Mother in Pool	Television film
2003	Coming Up	Mum	Episode: "Naked"
2004	Nighty Night	Mrs. Wickstead	Episode: #1.2
2008	Last of the Summer Wine	Vicar's Wife	Episode: "The Mischievous Tinkle in Howard's Eye"
2010	Mistresses	Ward Nurse	Episode: #3.4
2015	Birds of a Feather	Gail	Episode: "Tracey's Choice"
2020	Doctors	Laura Evans	Episode: "Haunted"

=== Film ===
Year	Title	Role	Notes
1971	The Tales of Beatrix Potter	Beatrix Potter	
1973	That'll Be the Day	Joan	
1974	Sex Play	Ducky	
1979	Dominique		
1998	Written in Blood	Anne Braithwaite	
2014	Mohammed	Mamma McCarthy	Short film
2014	Perfect State	Retired Wife	Short film
2015	Whiplash Dreams	Mother	
2017	Yellow Jacket	Diane Johnson	
2019	Sequins	Mrs. Coughlin	Short film
2020	Yoga in Isolation	Wynne	Short film
2021	Bell Bottom	Zelda Wagner	
2021	Last First	Loretta	
2022	Noah	Vera	Short film
2023	All Roads Lead to Home	Pink	
