= The IMAX Nutcracker =

British film

- IMAX Nutcracker DVD cover
- Directed by: Christine Edzard
- Screenplay by: Christine Edzard
- Based on: The Nutcracker and the Mouse King by E. T. A. Hoffmann
- Produced by: Celia Bannerman; Andrew Gellis; Lorne Orleans; Olivier Stockman
- Starring: Miriam Margolyes; Heathcote Williams; Lotte Johnson; Benjamin Hall; Harriet Thorpe; Patrick Pearson
- Cinematography: Noel Archambault
- Music by: Pyotr Ilyich Tchaikovsky
- Production company: Sands Films
- Distributed by: IMAX
- Release date: 27 November 1997
- Running time: 37 minutes
- Country: United States
- Language: English
- Box office: $1,009,291

The IMAX Nutcracker is a 1997 short Christmas film directed by Christine Edzard based on The Nutcracker and the Mouse King by E. T. A. Hoffmann. It was produced by Celia Bannerman, Andrew Gellis, Lorne Orleans and Olivier Stockman at Sands Films Studios in London. The film stars Miriam Margolyes, Heathcote Williams, Lotte Johnson, Benjamin Hall, Harriet Thorpe, and Patrick Pearson.

The music by Tchaikovsky was arranged by Michael Sanvoisin and cinematography was by Noel Archambault.

The IMAX Nutcracker is a 3-D IMAX narrative film telling the story of Little Clara who receives a toy nutcracker for Christmas and sees it come to life later that night. The Nutcracker Prince takes Clara to an enchanted land where she meets the Sugar Plum Fairies.

== Production ==
Sands Films, the production company that made the film, is owned and run by Christine Edzard, the screenwriter and director, and her husband Richard B. Goodwin.

The film was made in collaboration with Goodwin by Edzard, who is known for her meticulous filmmaking often based on Victorian English sources. Their earlier productions include Stories from a Flying Trunk (1979), The Nightingale (1981), Biddy (1983), Little Dorrit (1987), The Fool (1989), As You Like It (1991), Amahl and the Night Visitors (1996), The Children's Midsummer Night's Dream (2001) and The Good Soldier Schwejk (2018).

== Reception ==
Variety was positive, writing “while it lacks the richness and texture of the famed ballet, “The IMAX Nutcracker” is nevertheless solid family entertainment.” The reviewer praised the film's “strong production values”, predicting it would “become a holiday classic”.

New York Times described it as “the movie equivalent of...layer cake that's so rich it can only be consumed in tiny nibbles” and “a holiday dreamscape that is considerably darker in tone that the ballet”. The “sheer opulence” was praised for being impressive but they thought the film “never feels magical” and was more “like being in a department store at the height of the Christmas season and not knowing where to look.”

Chicago Tribune gave the film a mixed review. They thought that despite the anticipation of director Christine Edzard's “uniquely charmingly sensibility”, the film “disappointed” due to the use of actors instead of dancers. Nevertheless, it is “an intelligent and sumptuous interlude”.
