= The Children's Midsummer Night's Dream =

2001 British film by Christine Edzard

The Children's Midsummer Night's Dream (2001, film)
- The Children's Midsummer Night's Dream (2001, film) DVD cover
- Directed by: Christine Edzard
- Based on: A Midsummer Night's Dream by William Shakespeare
- Produced by: Olivier Stockman
- Starring: Jamie Peachey; John Heyfron; Danny Bishop; Jessica Fowler; Leanne Lyson
- Cinematography: Joachim Bergamin
- Music by: Michel Sanvoisin
- Production company: Sands Films Ltd.
- Distributed by: Squirrel Films Distributors Ltd
- Release date: 22 June 2001
- Running time: 113 minutes
- Country: United Kingdom
- Language: English

The Children's Midsummer Night's Dream is a 2001 film based on the play A Midsummer Night's Dream by William Shakespeare. It was written and directed by Christine Edzard and produced by Olivier Stockman. The music by Michel Sanvoisin was performed by the Goldsmiths Youth Orchestra, conducted by Eli Corp. The film features Jamie Peachey, John Heyfron, Danny Bishop, Jessica Fowler and Leane Lyson. It uses Shakespeare's complete text, as well as elaborate costumes and “intricately and properly scaled sets” created in the studio.

== Production ==
A Children's Midsummer Night's Dream was made with a cast of 364 children, aged between 8 and 12, from 8 primary schools in Rotherhithe, east London. Shot on a very low budget, the film was made at Sands Films studios, the converted docklands warehouse where Edzard directed Little Dorrit. This was the tenth collaboration between Goodwin and Edzard, who is known for her meticulous filmmaking, often based on Victorian English sources. Their other productions include Stories from a Flying Trunk (1979), The Nightingale (1981), Biddy (1983), Little Dorrit (1987), The Fool (1990), As You Like It (1991), Amahl and the Night Visitors (1996), The IMAX Nutcracker (1997) and The Good Soldier Schwejk (2018).

Many of the children who formed the cast, all non-professional actors, came from the North Peckham estate where 10-year old Damilola Taylor was fatally stabbed during production, just a stone's throw from Sands studios. This event drew the world's attention to some of the estates of Southwark, their abandonment and lack of government funding and resources, and associated crime levels. However, Sands' film project, which “acquainted a multiracial group of inner-city schoolchildren with Shakespeare” was turned down by the Arts Council for lottery funding, despite the council's stated aims to “support and encourage cultural diversity and social inclusiveness”.

The Arts Council's decision was upheld later in the year by its successor the British Film Council who complained that the project was “not sufficiently creative.” The Sands team funded the project from savings, while the film's producer Olivier Stockman pointed out that “Kenneth Branagh can get £1 million to do Shakespeare but kids from Southwark cannot get anything.”

This led to the stalling of the film during post-production. According to Stockman, the Arts Council's decision was made on political, rather than artistic, terms and was affected by the political nature of the film – for example the decision by director Edzard not to recruit the children through an acting agency.

Edzard and production co-ordinator Annabel Hands said they preferred to use untrained children with “no preconceptions”. The cast of children learnt new skills and improved their self-esteem, and “not one child dropped out during the six-month shoot.” Edzard explained that these were children who had “potential and curiosity” but “were not being offered anything” and were hence “cut off from reality”.

When Stockman began working with Edzard in the late 1970s, she already had the idea for the film. Loving the play, but realising that its childish or ridiculous situations presented difficulties for adult actors, Edzard decided that the only way to make the film work would be to use actors who would not bring cultural baggage inherited from drama school or familiarity with Shakespeare. Hence the decision to use children, who would read the text without adding their own, sometimes misjudged, experience.

Filming took around six months during the school year. The studio was only allowed to take the children out for a few hours a day - collecting them in a minibus after lunch and returning them home individually. The classes were often overcrowded so the schools were pleased that some children were taken out of the classroom as it made it more manageable for them. The children were not only performers but were involved in the whole project of making a film - doing clapperboards, preparing the costumes, the sets, the forest, cutting leaves in workshops.

== Themes and interpretations ==
Edzard's approach to A Children's Midsummer Night's Dream has been described as “finding specifically childlike concerns” in Shakespeare's play, rather than "mobilising it" for older audiences. The casting of children represents “an event unique in Shakespearean cinematic history” but also recaptures the audience's understanding of the playwright's “wonder and invention” as the young cast members appropriate the theme of Shakespeare's original to "match the considerations of their own experience."

The age of the actors makes them incompatible with the play's themes of marriage, sexuality and domestic power, creating a cognitive dissonance in for example the childlike appearance of Titiania (played by Rajouana Zalal), and the complex grammar of her long speech about the miserable weather. This also makes Edzard's project of interest for studies of gender and gender politics, as well as of cultural authority.

Producer Oliver Stockman describes how the children are able to play three groups of characters - lovers, fairies and mechanicals - without having to make a complicated effort: "The lovers are young...inexperienced...they talk about love but they haven't done it, they haven't kissed, they're just very excited about it. That's relevant to young children in the same way as it is relevant to the characters in the play. (They) love to play at being fairies, at being magical, at being able to fly, being able to transform themselves...whereas a 20-year old actress may find it difficult. And they are inexperienced ... exactly like the mechanicals...they are not pretending not to understand their lines, they just are. So there's not this double game."

The Children's Midsummer Night's Dream advances the bold, but less obviously social, engagement with “social malfeance and urban ills” which animated Edzard, her husband Richard Goodwin and producer Stockman's earlier film projects Little Dorrit, The Fool and As You Like It.

== Reception ==
Writing in the Literature/ Film Quarterly journal, Mark Thornton Burnett describes The Children's Midsummer Night's Dream as “a wonderful achievement” by director Christine Edzard, who has “established herself as a significant voice in the reinterpretation of classic writers”.

The Radio Times was generally positive, praising the “charming puppet theatre” and the “quaintly contrived woodland nooks” of the film's set and describing it as “the best school production you're ever likely to see.” Although they thought that the film “lacked immediacy” and the children's non-professional acting style was “the main problem”, they concluded that its “honesty and homely ingenuity” made it “an impossible film to dislike.”

Some reviewers were more ambivalent. BBC Film Reviews, while understanding the director's decision to "tap into" the “self-consciousness, directness, and enthusiasm” of “ordinary schoolkids”, complained that the young actors were “of decidedly mixed abilities”, sometimes faltering in delivery or using a “wrong emphasis”, and, as children, were not able to “carry...the soul of Shakespeare's adult characters”. At the same time, the reviewer praised the film's “charm, perkiness and photography (which does capture the mystery and magic)”, as well as the film's structure which sees the children “immersed in watching a puppet version of the play, actually enter the play, becoming characters themselves.”
