= Hal Cruttenden =

English stand-up comedian, writer, and actor

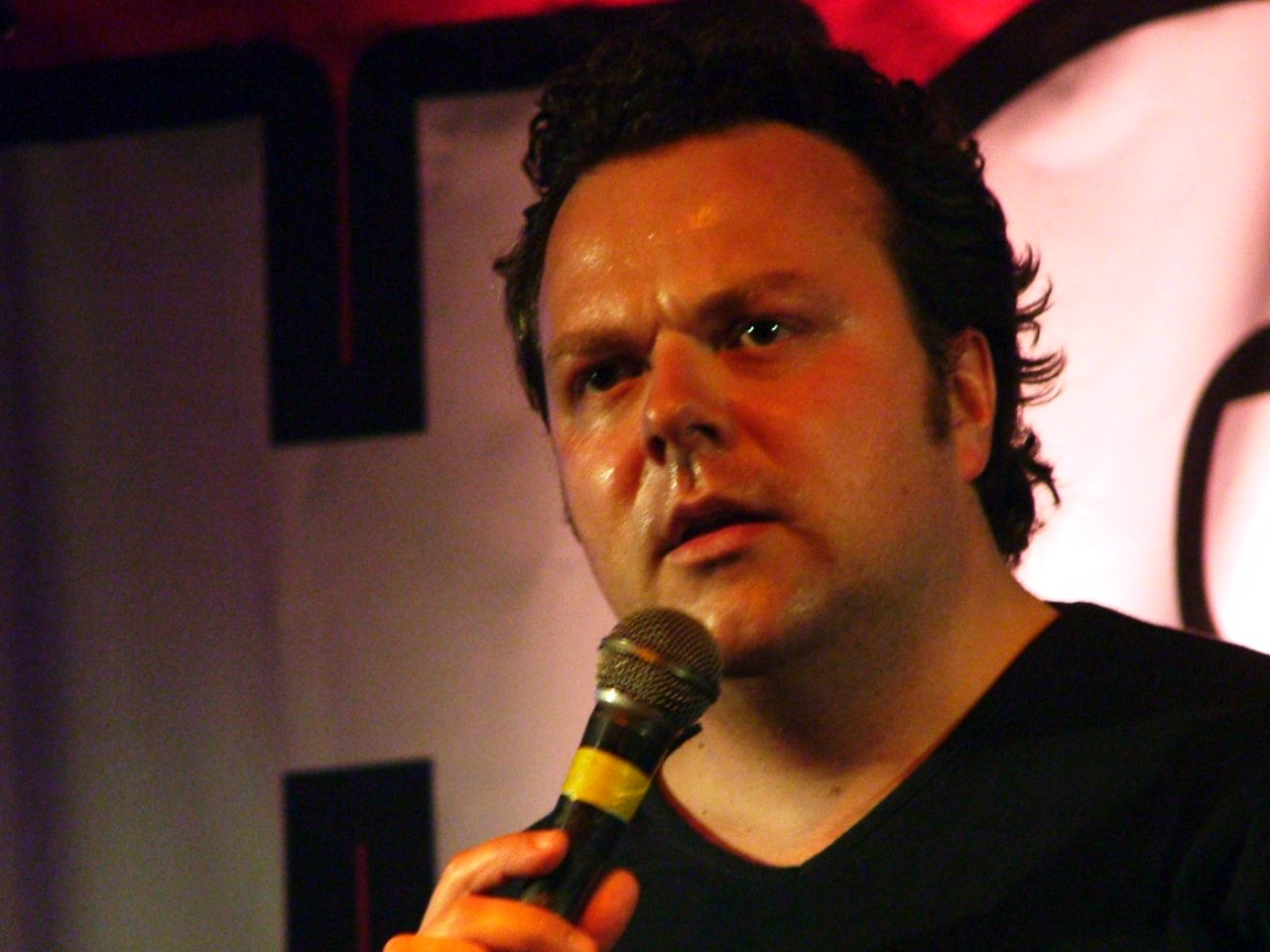
- Cruttenden performing in May 2005
- Born: 9 September 1969 (age 57); London, England
- Occupations: Comedian, actor, presenter, writer
- Spouse: Dawn Coulter (m. 2000; div. 2022)
- Children: 2
- Relatives: Abigail Cruttenden (sister)
- Website: halcruttenden.com

Hal Dominic Bart Cruttenden (born 9 September 1969) is an English stand-up comedian, actor, presenter, and writer.

== Early life ==
Hal Dominic Bart Cruttenden was born in the Ealing district of London on 9 September 1969. His grandmother, Cynthia Coatts (1915–2013) founded the Rosslyn School of Dance and Drama in London, while his mother, Julia (née Coats; 1938–2013), ran the stage make-up school Greasepaint in London. His father, Neville Cruttenden (1940–1990), was an advertising executive who also indulged in amateur theatrics before deciding to become a professional actor at 49. He has two older sisters: Hannah, a journalist, and actress Abigail Cruttenden.

He was educated at St Paul's School.

== Career ==
Cruttenden studied acting and had small roles on shows such as EastEnders and Kavanagh QC in the 1990s, as well as voicing BBC radio traffic reports. Despite nervousness, he performed stand-up comedy for the first time at the age of 27. He was nominated for Best Newcomer at the 2002 Edinburgh Comedy Awards.

In September 2025, Cruttenden was cast as Winston Churchill in the film The Man with the Plan about the Beveridge Report.

== Personal life ==
Cruttenden married Dawn Coulter, a Northern Irish artist from Derry, in 2000; they divorced in 2022. They have two daughters, born in 2000 and 2002.
