= Sands Films =

British film production company

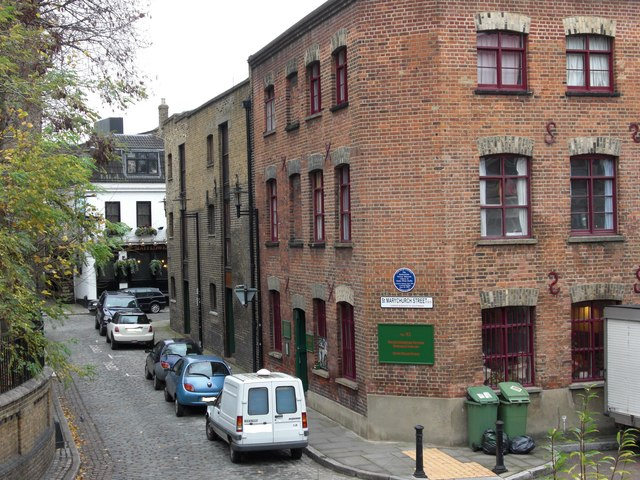
- Sands Films building
- Industry: Film production
- Founded: 1975
- Headquarters: London, England
- Website: www.sandsfilms.co.uk

Sands Films is a small, independent, British film production company, founded by producer Richard Goodwin and director Christine Edzard in the early 1970s, and based in Rotherhithe, London. The company is known for making the film adaption of Charles Dickens' Little Dorrit in 1987, and for its production of costumes for period dramas. Sands Films is run by Christine Edzard and Olivier Stockman. Since 2005 the building has been open to the public regularly via the Sands Films Cinema Club and Music Room, adding to the "remarkable and very valuable operation, which not only creates in-house, but also opens a window on another world."

== Background ==
The building that Sands Films occupies is a former granary, now a grade II listed building. The business was founded in 1975 and, since 1976, it has housed a small film stage, film theatre, picture library, workshops and costume stores. The Goodwins initially used the derelict building rent-free, on the basis they completely repaired and renovated the property. Managing director Olivier Stockman has worked for Sands Studios since 1980.

In 2011, the company's annual turnover exceeded £1 million for the first time. After its rent almost quadrupled since 2000 and it had been asked to pay back-rent for an unrenovated part of the building, the company began to raise funds to purchase the property. This included selling shares at £500 each, and later in 2012, they successfully bought the property, with plans to modernise its production facilities. The studio and its struggle to survive increasing rent and costs was the subject of a BBC Inside Out program in 2012. The BBC film also highlights the four generations who have worked at Sands since it was founded.

As an independent film production studio Sands Films has its own soundproof stage, workshops, costume department, set construction workshop, cutting room, cinema and other services needed to make films. It is a self-sufficient and fully integrated production facility. Cinema and television companies as varied as Working Title, Talkback, BBC, Channel 4, Freemantle, Ridley Scott Associates, Sky TV, the Royal Opera House, the New York Metropolitan Opera and Canal+ have used the facilities at Sands Films for their projects.

The weekly film club is free, with donations invited, and is housed in a "cosy" cinema in the 18th century building which contains "a myriad of aesthetically pleasing spaces". These include music performances, book launches, political debates and theatre productions, as well as the non-digital Rotherhithe Picture Research Library which is an educational trust and is open to all at no cost.

With the COVID-19 lockdown the studio intensified its live streaming activities. Stockman explained:

“Sands Films always had a connection with live music and music performance in general. But during the Covid lockdown, the studio’s recording and broadcasting facilities were made available to musicians who were deprived of their live audience, and therefore of their income. We offered the Music Room as accessible and open to all: without a paywall, fees or anything. All we asked is for donations from those who can afford it."

Since then all Sands Films’ music events have been hybrid, with a live audience in the theatre, online viewers at home and unrestricted access remaining the same. While performers are paid a minimum guarantee, Stockman says:

"Our open door policy reflects the fact that art and culture should not be treated as commodities. Music, in particular, is destined to all and should not be conditional upon a financial transaction.”

Griff Rhys Jones has described Sands Films as "romantic and inspiring; efficient, fun and creative. I love working down there. I love the atmosphere. You feel lucky to be there and privileged to get stuck into the serious business of creating fantasy in such surroundings.”

== Productions ==
Productions by Sands Films include Stories from a Flying Trunk (1979), The Nightingale (1981), Biddy (1983), Little Dorrit (1987), Old Ways New Ways (1988), The Fool (1989), As You Like It (1991), Amahl and the Night Visitors (1996), The IMAX Nutcracker (1997), The Children's Midsummer Night's Dream (2001), The Good Soldier Schwejk (2018) and The Man With The Plan (2026).

The studio has delivered full production packages to companies requiring a London studio base, such as A Passage to India (1984) and Bright Star (2009). Sands Films was the production base for The Long Day Closes (1992), including the building of all sets. Sands Films supplied facilities to Working Title's productions of Anna Karenina (2012) and Les Miserables (2012), and to Touching the Void (2003). The studio was a co-production partner on A Dangerous Man: Lawrence After Arabia (1990), La luna en botella (2007) and Garbo: El espia (2009).

Other films the company has been involved in for production services include Agatha Christie films produced by EMI - Death on the Nile) (1978), The Mirror Crack'd (1980), Evil Under The Sun (1982) - and Seven Years in Tibet (1997). Sands hand-embroidered the costumes for the main characters in the BBC's 2015 series Wolf Hall.

In 2017, Sands Films produced The Good Soldier Schwejk, written and directed by Christine Edzard and based on The Good Soldier Švejk by Jaroslav Hašek. The project partly was funded by the auction of a costume worn by Mark Rylance in the BBC's Wolf Hall.

Filming began in October 2024 for a new production called The Man with the Plan which stars Simon Callow as William Beveridge and comedian Mark Thomas as the Narrator. Comedian Hal Cruttenden also appear as Winston Churchill, and Andrew Tiernan as Nye Bevan. The film tells the story of a young woman of today who discovers Beveridge's 1942 report - the Plan - which led to the founding of the welfare state. On 12 and 13 April 2025, Sands Films held a filmed public event at their studios in Rotherhithe and invited political campaigners and activists to speak about their campaigns and issues, particularly in relation to the "giants" of Beveridge's report - squalor, idleness, ignorance, disease and poverty. Mark Thomas hosted the event and all speeches delivered onstage were recorded on the day and made available online.

Sands Films Productions
Year	Title	Director	Writer	Producer	Awards
1979	Stories from a Flying Trunk	Christine Edzard	Hans Christian Andersen, Christine Edzard	John Brabourne, Richard Goodwin	
1981	The Nightingale	Christine Edzard	Hans Christian Andersen	Richard B. Goodwin	Won award at 12th International Short and Documentary Film Festival, Lille, 1982.
1983	Biddy	Christine Edzard	Christine Edzard	Richard B. Goodwin	Celia Bannerman (as Biddy) won an award at the Moscow Film Festival
1987	Little Dorrit	Christine Edzard	Charles Dickens, Christine Edzard	John Brabourne, Richard B. Goodwin	Two Academy Award nominations for Actor in a Supporting Role (Alec Guinness and Writing (screenplay Based on Material from Another Medium) (Christine Edzard); LA Critics Circle Award for Best Supporting Actress (Miriam Margolyes); Two BAFTA Award nominations for Best Screenplay – Adapted, and Best Costume Design, and one for the Golden Globes (USA) for Best Performance by an Actor in a Supporting Role; Evening Standard Award for Best Actor in 1987 (Derek Jacobi)
1988	Old Ways New Ways	Olivier Stockman	Olivier Stockman	Trevor Ingman	
1990	The Fool	Christine Edzard	Christine Edzard, Olivier Stockman	Celia Bannerman	
1991	As You Like It	Christine Edzard	William Shakespeare, Christine Edzard	Olivier Stockman, George Reinhart	
1996	Amahl and the Night Visitors	Christine Edzard	Gian Carlo Menotti, Christine Edzard	Olivier Stockman	
1997	The IMAX Nutcracker	Christine Edzard	E. T. A. Hoffmann, Christine Edzard	Celia Bannerman, Andrew Gellis, Lorne Orleans, Olivier Stockman	
2001	The Children's Midsummer Night's Dream	Christine Edzard	William Shakespeare, Christine Edzard	Olivier Stockman	
2018	The Good Soldier Schwejk	Christine Edzard	Jaroslav Hašek, Christine Edzard	Olivier Stockman	
2026	The Man with the Plan	Christine Edzard	Christine Edzard	Olivier Stockman	

== Making and supplying of period costumes ==
Year	Title		Designer	Academy Award Best Costumes	BAFTA/ Other Award Best Costumes
1992	A Dangerous Man: Lawrence After Arabia	TV movie	Claudie Gastine		
1994	The NeverEnding Story III: Escape from Fantasia	film	Vin Burnham, Monique Prudhomme		
1994	Screen Two Episode: Hope in the Year Two	TV series			
1997	Amistad	film	Ruth Carter	Nominee	
1997	Oscar and Lucinda	film	Janet Patterson	Nominee	
1997	The Woman in White	TV series	Odile Dicks-Mireaux		
1999	Great Expectations	film	Odile Dicks-Mireaux		Winner
1999	Topsy-Turvy	film	Lindy Hemming	Winner	
1999	Les Enfants du Siecle	film	Anaïs Romand		
2000	Gormenghast	TV series	Odile Dicks-Mireaux		Nominee
2001	The Lady and the Duke	film	Pierre-Jean Larroque		
2002	Gangs of New York	film	Sandy Powell	Nominee	Nominee
2002	Tipping the Velvet	TV mini series	Susannah Buxton		
2003	The Lost Prince	film	Odile Dicks-Mireaux		
2004	Vanity Fair	film	Beatrix Aruna Pasztor		Winner Satellite Awards
2004	Stage Beauty	film	Tim Hatley		
2004	Phantom of the Opera	film	Alexandra Byrne		
2005	Pride and Prejudice	film	Jacqueline Durran	Nominee	Nominee
2005	Oliver Twist	film	Anna B. Sheppard		
2005	Une Vie	TV movie	Catherine Leterrier		
2005	Fingersmith	TV series	Susannah Buxton		
2006	Marie Antoinette	film	Milena Canonero	Winner	Nominee
2007	Becoming Jane	film	Eimer Ni Mhaoldomhnaigh		Nominee Irish Awards
2007	Atonement	film	Jacqueline Durran	Nominee	Nominee
2007	Sweeney Todd: The Demon Barber of Fleet Street	film	Colleen Atwood	Nominee	Nominee
2007-2008	Lark Rise to Candleford	TV series	Phoebe de Gaye, Pam Downe		
2008	The Other Boleyn Girl	film	Sandy Powell		
2008	The Duchess	film	Michael O'Connor	Winner	Winner
2008	John Adams	TV series	Donna Zakowska		
2009	Bright Star	film	Janet Patterson	Nominee	Nominee
2009	The Young Victoria	film	Sandy Powell	Winner	Winner
2009	Creation	film	Louise Stjernsward		
2010	Burke and Hare	film	Deborah Landis		
2010	Alice in Wonderland	film	Colleen Atwood	Winner	Winner
2010	The Tempest	film	Sandy Powell	Nominee	
2011	Wuthering Heights	film	Steven Noble		
2011	Albert Nobbs	film	Pierre-Yves Gayraud		
2011	La Princesse de Montpensier	film	Caroline de Vivaise		Nominee Cesar Awards
2011	Jane Eyre	film	Michael O'Connor	Nominee	Nominee
2011	Anonymous	film	Lisy Christl	Nominee	
2011	L'Apollonide	film	Anaïs Romand		Winner César Awards
2012, 2016	The Hollow Crown	TV series	Odile Dicks-Mireaux; Nigel Egerton		Nominee BAFTA Craft Awards
2012	Lincoln	film	Joanna Johnston	Nominee	Nominee
2012	Bel Ami	film	Odile Dicks-Mireaux		
2012	Les Miserables	film	Paco Delgado	Nominee	Nominee
2012	Anna Karenina	film	Jacqueline Durran	Winner	Winner
2012	Great Expectations	film	Beatrix Aruna Pasztor		Nominee
2012	Abraham Lincoln: Vampire Hunter	film	Varvara Avdyushko, Carlo Poggioli		
2012	The Raven	film	Carlo Poggioli		
2012	Quartet	film	Odile Dicks-Mireaux		
2013	12 Years a Slave	film	Patricia Norris	Nominee	
2013	The Invisible Woman	film	Michael O'Connor	Nominee	Nominee
2013	La Religieuse	film	Anaïs Romand		
2013	The Devil's Violinist	film	Birgit Hutter		
2013	Pride and Prejudice: Having a Ball	TV movie	Amy Cartwright		
2014	Mr Turner	film	Jacqueline Durran	Nominee	Nominee
2014	Amour Fou	film	Tanja Hausner		
2014	A Little Chaos	film	Joan Bergin		
2014	Outlander S1	TV series	Terry Dresbach, Glenne Campbell		
2014	Casanova Variations	film	Andreas Donhauser, Renate Martin		
2015	Far from the Madding Crowd	film	Janet Patterson		Nominee Satellite Awards
2015	Macbeth	film	Jacqueline Durran		Nominee Satellite Awards
2015	Wolf Hall S1	TV series	Joanna Eatwell		
2015	Jonathan Strange & Mr Norrell	TV series	Barbara Kidd		
2015	Cinderella	film	Sandy Powell	Nominee	Nominee, Nominee Satellite Awards
2015	If It Be Love	film	Johanna Elf		
2016	Roots	TV series	Diana Cilliers; Ruth Carter		Nominee Creative Arts Emmy Awards
2016	Victoria	TV series	Rosalind Ebbutt		
2016	To Walk Invisible	TV movie	Tom Pye		
2016	A Dangerous Fortune	TV movie	Eimer Ni Mhaoldomhnaigh		
2016	Love & Friendship	film	Eimer Ni Mhaoldomhnaigh		
2016	Outlander S2	TV series	Terry Dresbach		Nominee Emmy (for "Not In Scotland Anymore")
2017	Taboo	TV series	Joanna Eatwell		
2017	Victoria and Abdul	film	Consolata Boyle	Nominee	
2017	Will	TV series	Kym Barrett		
2017	Tulip Fever	film	Michael O'Connor		
2017	Beauty and the Beast	film	Jacqueline Durran	Nominee	Nominee
2017	Harlots	TV series	Edward Gibbon		
2017	Outlander S3	TV series	Terry Dresbach		Nominee Emmy (for "Freedom & Whisky")
2018	Peterloo	film	Jacqueline Durran		
2018	The Sisters Brothers	film	Milena Canonero		Nominee César Awards
2018	Mary Magdalene	film	Jacqueline Durran		
2018	Un Peuple et son Roi	film	Anaïs Romand		Nominee César Awards
2018	Le Retour du Heros	film	Pierre Jean Larroque		
2018	Harlots 2	TV series	Charlotte Mitchell		
2018	Outlander S4	TV series	Terry Dresbach, Nina Ayres		
2019	Little Women	film	Jacqueline Durran	Winner	Winner
2019	The Personal History of David Copperfield	film	Suzie Harman; Robert Worley		Winner BIFA, Winner Satellite Awards
2019	Gentleman Jack	TV series	Tom Pye		
2019	Harlots 3	TV Series	Richard Cooke		
2020	Ammonite	film	Michael O'Connor		Nominee, Nominee BIFA
2020	Outlander S5	TV series	Trisha Biggar		
2021	The Irregulars	TV series	Edward Gibbon		
2021	The Electrical Life of Louis Wain	film	Michael O'Connor		
2022	The Gilded Age S1	TV series	Kasia Walicka Maimone, Patrick Wiley		
2022	Emily	film	Michael O'Connor		
2022	Chevalier	film	Oliver Garcia		
2022	Outlander S6	TV series	Trisha Biggar		
2022	The Corn is Green (National Theatre)	theatre	Ultz		
2022	A Christmas Carol (Old Vic)	theatre	Rob Howell		
2022	Under the Banner of Heaven	TV miniseries	Joseph La Corte		
2022	The Pale Blue Eye	film	Kasia Walicka, Maimone		
2022	The Wonder	film	Odile Dicks-Mireaux		
2022	The Confessions of Frannie Langton	TV series	Nigel Egerton		
2022	Persuasion	film	Marianne Agertoft		
2022	Catherine Called Birdy	film	Julian Day		
2022	Our Flag Means Death	TV series	Christine Wada, Gypsy Taylor		
2022	The Empress S1	TV series	Gabrielle Reumer		
2022	Jewel	film	Lebo Motahane		
2023	Firebrand	film	Michael O'Connor		
2023	The Gilded Age S2	TV series	Kasia Walicka Maimone, Patrick Wiley		
2023	Jeanne du Barry	film	Jurgen Doering		Nominee César Awards
2023	The Little Mermaid	film	Colleen Atwood		
2023	Napoleon	film	David Crossman Janty Yates	Nominee	Nominee
2023	Outlander S7	TV series	Trisha Biggar		
2023	The Great S3	TV series	Sharon Long		Winner Emmy (for "Choose Your Weapon")
2023	Tom Jones	TV series	Hazel Webb Crozier		
2023	Queen Charlotte: A Bridgerton Story	TV miniseries	Laura Frecon, Lyn Paolo		Nominee Emmy
2023	The Artful Dodger	TV series	Xanthe Heubel		
2023	Polite Society	film	PC Williams		
2024	A Thousand Blows	TV series	Maja Meschede		
2024	Manhunt	TV miniseries	Katie Irish		
2024	Mary & George	TV miniseries	Annie Symons		
2024	Renegade Nell	TV series	Tom Pye		
2024	Belgravia: The Next Chapter	TV series	Phoebe De Gaye		
2024	The Count of Monte Cristo	film	Thierry Delettre		
2024	The Count of Monte Cristo	TV series	Ursula Patzak		
2024	Here	film	Joanna Johnston		
2024	Wolf Hall S2	TV series	Joanna Eatwell		
2024	Harvest	film	Kirsty Halliday		
2024	The Completely Made-Up Adventures of Dick Turpin	TV series	Rosa Dias, Richard Cooke		
2024	Nosferatu	film	Linda Muir	Nominee	Nominee
2024	The Empress S2	TV series	Gabrielle Reumer		
2025	Leopardi. Il poeta dell'infinito	TV series	Luca Costigliolo, Alice Di Luigi, Irene Trovato		
2025	Inheritance	film	Kriti Malhotra, Stacy Jansen		
2025	The Buccaneers S2	TV series	Kate Carin		
2025	Frankenstein	film	Kate Hawley		
2025	Dope Girls	TV series	Sophia Canale		
2025	The Leopard	TV miniseries	Carlo Poggioli, Edoardo Russo		
2025	Snow White	film	Sandy Powell		
2025	Colours of Time	film	Pierre-Yves Gayraud		
