= Stories from a Flying Trunk =

British film from 1979

- Stories from a Flying Trunk DVD cover
- Directed by: Christine Edzard
- Based on: Original stories by Hans Christian Andersen
- Produced by: John Brabourne and Richard Goodwin
- Starring: Murray Melvin; Ann Firbank; John Tordoff; John Dalby; Patricia Napier and dancers of the Royal Ballet
- Cinematography: Robin Browne and Brian West
- Edited by: Rex Pyke and M. J. Knatchbull
- Music by: Gioacchino Rossini
- Production company: Sands Films Ltd.
- Distributed by: EMI Film Distributors Ltd
- Release date: November 1979
- Running time: 84 minutes
- Country: United Kingdom
- Language: English

Stories from a Flying Trunk is a 1979 film based on three stories by Hans Christian Andersen. It was devised, written and directed by Christine Edzard and produced by John Brabourne and Richard Goodwin.

The music by Giacchino Rossini was arranged by John Dalby, and the choreography was by Frederick Ashton. The film stars Murray Melvin as H. C. Andersen, and Ann Firbank, John Tordoff, John Dalby, Patricia Napier and dancers of the Royal Ballet.

The stories the film is based on are The Kitchen, in which household objects come to life, The Little Match Girl, which updates Andersen's tale to the East End of London in the late 1970s, and Little Ida, with dance featuring members of the Royal Ballet.

== Production ==
Stories from a Flying Trunk was made as three short films when Edzard and Goodwin moved into two disused warehouses in Rotherhithe and equipped them with a small film studio. Dramatised in the "same expressive vein as Tales of Beatrix Potter (1971), for which Edzard was a co-writer of the screenplay as well as the production and costume designer, the film is an example of the "flourishing of British fantasy cinema" which was supported by EMI Films in the mid- to late-1970s.

It was the second collaboration between Goodwin and Edzard, who is known for her meticulous filmmaking, often based on Victorian English sources, following their entry into film in 1971 with the screenplay of The Tales of Beatrix Potter. Their other productions include The Nightingale (1981), Biddy (1983), Little Dorrit (1987), The Fool (1990), As You Like It (1991), Amahl and the Night Visitors (1996), The IMAX Nutcracker (1997), The Children's Midsummer Night's Dream (2001) and The Good Soldier Schwejk (2018).

The film was released on DVD in 2016.

== Reception ==
An AllMovie.com reviewer described the film's Little Match Girl as suffering "an impecunious existence in London's East End", and in the Little Ida story, in which "a love of dancing is embodied in the performances of the two dancers from the Royal Ballet", "dancers take on the roles of garden variety vegetables in undoubtedly one of their more unusually costumed performances."

Karen Woodham wrote, in Blazing Minds, that the movie "captures the charm" of Hans Christian Anderson's stories with a "spellbinding blend of choreography, stop-motion and live action".

Writing for Blueprint Review, Loki Dawson thought that, although the film is "random" and sometimes "disjointed", it is enjoyable to watch and a "wonderful amalgamation of both live action and stop motion".

== See also ==
- Pas de légumes
