= The Nightingale (1981 film) =

British film

- Nightingale DVD cover
- Directed by: Christine Edzard
- Based on: The Nightingale by Hans Christian Andersen
- Produced by: Richard B. Goodwin
- Starring: Richard Goolden; Mandy Carlin; John Dalby
- Cinematography: Christopher Challis
- Music by: Beethoven
- Production company: Sands Films
- Distributed by: Channel 4
- Release date: 1981
- Running time: 143 minutes
- Country: United Kingdom
- Language: English

The Nightingale is a 1981 film directed by Christine Edzard and produced by Richard B. Goodwin at Sands Films Studios in London. The film features Richard Goolden, Mandy Carlin and John Dalby. The music by Beethoven was arranged by Michael Sanvoisin and cinematography was by Christopher Challis. The film uses puppets to tell Hans Christian Andersen's tale about the song of a nightingale heard by the little kitchen girl at the Emperor of China's palace.

== Production ==
Sands Films, the production company that made the film, is owned and run by Christine Edzard, the screenwriter and director known for her meticulous filmmaking, often based on Victorian English sources, and her husband Richard B. Goodwin. Their other productions include Stories from a Flying Trunk (1979), Biddy (1983), Little Dorrit (1987), The Fool (1990), As You Like It (1991), Amahl and the Night Visitors (1996), The IMAX Nutcracker (1997), The Children's Midsummer Night's Dream (2001) and The Good Soldier Schwejk (2018).

Like Stories from a Flying Trunk, The Nightingale is based on a story by Hans Christian Andersen, with elaborate costumes and intricate sets. The film used stop-frame animation with figures made of sheet lead, including their fingers, to stop the moving parts from fracturing during filming.

== Reception ==
The Nightingale won an award at the 12th International Short and Documentary Film Festival in Lille, January 1982.
