= Biddy (1983 film) =

British film

- DVD cover
- Directed by: Christine Edzard
- Screenplay by: Christine Edzard
- Produced by: Richard B. Goodwin
- Starring: Celia Bannerman; Sam Ghazoros; Kate Elphick; Patricia Napier; Sally Ashby; John Dalby
- Cinematography: Alec Mills
- Music by: Michel Sanvoisin
- Production company: Sands Films
- Distributed by: Network Distributing
- Release date: September 1983
- Running time: 83 minutes
- Country: United Kingdom
- Language: English

Biddy is a 1983 film written and directed by Christine Edzard, and produced by Richard B. Goodwin at Sands Films Studios in London. The film stars acclaimed actress and theatre director Celia Bannerman (in the title role), Sam Ghazoros, Kate Elphic, Patricia Napier, Sally Ashby, and John Dalby. The music was arranged by Michael Sanvoisin and cinematography was by Alec Mills.

== Plot summary ==
The film tells the nostalgic story of a gentle and loving nursery maid in Victorian England and her relationship with the two children in her care as they grow into adulthood. The nanny imparts the lessons of her life through poetry and homily, with an eccentric sense of humour.

== Production ==
Sands Films, the production company that made the film, is owned and run by Christine Edzard, the screenwriter and director, and her husband Richard B. Goodwin.

Biddy was the third film made in collaboration with Goodwin by Edzard, who is known for her meticulous filmmaking, often based on Victorian English sources. The earlier productions were Stories from a Flying Trunk (1979) and The Nightingale (1981), and the couple's later films include Little Dorrit (1987), The Fool (1990), As You Like It (1991), Amahl and the Night Visitors (1996), The IMAX Nutcracker (1997), The Children's Midsummer Night's Dream (2001) and The Good Soldier Schwejk (2018).

== Reception ==
Celia Bannerman received an award at the Moscow Film Festival for her portrayal of the title character Biddy.

Time Out was very positive, describing it as "a meticulously realised" and "perfectly nostalgic picture" which "extolls the virtues of Biddy" but whose real celebration is of the "paraphernalia of these lives. The sewing-boxes, the button-holes, the pieces of treen and piles of handworked lace, these are the real stars of the film".

Empire gave the film three out of five stars, writing "Edzard's pensive drama...chronicles a maid's ritualistic devotion to her master's children in fetishistic detail. Here, story is replaced by the soothing rhythm of routine, all hushed voice-over and clock-ticking interiors. A gentle, whispering cinematic lullaby."
