= The Good Soldier Schwejk (2018 film) =

British film

- Good Soldier Schwejk DVD cover
- Directed by: Christine Edzard
- Screenplay by: Christine Edzard
- Based on: The Good Soldier Švejk by Jaroslav Hašek
- Produced by: Olivier Stockman
- Starring: Alfie Stewart; Joe Armstrong; Kevin Brewer; Sean Gilder; Shona McWilliams; Michael Mears
- Cinematography: Joachim Bergamin
- Music by: Michel Sanvoisin
- Production company: Sands Films
- Release date: 1 November 2018
- Country: United Kingdom
- Language: English

The Good Soldier Schwejk is a 2018 anti-war satirical film directed by Christine Edzard. It is based on the dark comedy novel The Good Soldier Švejk by Jaroslav Hašek, published between 1921 and 1923. The film was produced by Olivier Stockman at Sands Films Studios in London and stars Alfie Stewart, Joe Armstrong, Kevin Brewer, Sean Gilder, Shona McWilliams and Michael Mears. Music was arranged by Michael Sanvoisin and cinematography by Joachim Bergamin.

Schwejk is the story of a First World War soldier protesting the nature of war, which he sees as irrational and absurd.

== Production ==
Sands Films, the production company that made The Good Soldier Schwejk, is owned and run by Christine Edzard, the screenwriter and director, and her husband Richard B. Goodwin.

The film was made in collaboration with Goodwin by Edzard, who is known for her meticulous filmmaking often based on Victorian English sources. Their earlier productions include Stories from a Flying Trunk (1979), The Nightingale (1981), Biddy (1983), Little Dorrit (1987), The Fool (1989), As You Like It (1991), Amahl and the Night Visitors (1996), The IMAX Nutcracker (1997) and The Children's Midsummer Night's Dream (2001).

The soundtrack for the movie includes Piano Sonata No. 11, K. 331 / 300i, Movement 3 - Rondo alla turca (Turkish March), written by Wolfgang Amadeus Mozart, arranged for accordion by Michel Sanvoisin and performed by Junchi Deng.

To raise money for Sands' anti-war film, the studio auctioned the costume they custom-made for Mark Rylance in the 2015 BBC mini-series adaption of Hilary Mantel's Wolf Hall. Rylance is a patron of the Stop The War coalition.

Edzard's Schwejk aims at a fusion of cinema and live theatre, according to the director, who explained, “It's not a documentary or a film on location or a filmed play. The film element gives it another life. From the beginning, it has been conceived as a film that would have a play at its core.” Sands' theatre is housed in their studio warehouse, which was built in the 1780s using reclaimed ship timbers. The director explained that filming the project inside this building “makes it more concentrated, so we can deliver a concentrated message...it's very different to rehearse and to deliver a play than to make a film.”

Adapted for the 21st century, the film incorporates years of Edzard's own research, including words taken from speeches by well-known figures such as Tony Blair, George W Bush and Colin Powell. She said, “it was an enormous reading operation...These quotes are all public quotes, speeches, things that have been printed. Really shockingly absurd.”

At the same time, it extends back to Hasek's original concept of Schwejk as a political cabaret sketch. It was filmed as a series of seven live, interactive theatre performances, at Sands Studio in Rotherhithe in July 2017 with audiences being asked to shout out the names of modern weaponry at strategic points in the show.

Producer Olivier Stockman described the film's politics: “It's a...protest against the fact that our society is drifting towards war right now as we speak.”

== Reception ==
Peace News gave the film a very positive review in 2018 on their website, stating in conclusion that "Despite Schwejk’s (often very funny) innocence and naivety, this film remains a scathing critique of war, the arms trade, and the class system. It is well-researched, well-acted, and thought-provoking."

Another review states: "It is much more than a filmed stage play. With imaginative, inexpensive sets and a three-piece orchestra, including an accordion, playing pieces by Mozart off-stage, the film is all the better for the chosen format."

The independent reviewer on the site Londongrip found the film showing some good comic performances but the overall production somehow lacking pace and subtlety at times.
