= The Fool (1990 film) =

- Directed by: Christine Edzard
- Written by: Christine Edzard; Olivier Stockman
- Produced by: Celia Bannerman
- Starring: Derek Jacobi; Cyril Cusack; Ruth Mitchell
- Cinematography: Robin Vidgeon
- Edited by: Olivier Stockman
- Music by: Michel Sanvoisin
- Production company: Sands Films
- Distributed by: Barcino Barcino Films S.A.
- Release date: 7 December 1990 (UK)
- Running time: 140 minutes
- Country: UK
- Language: English
- Budget: £4 million

The Fool is a 1990 British film set in Victorian England's world of finance directed by Christine Edzard and produced by John Brabourne and Richard Goodwin, from a script by Edzard and Olivier Stockman. It stars Derek Jacobi, Cyril Cusack, Ruth Mitchell, Maria Aitken, Irina Brook, Paul Brook and Miranda Richardson. The camerawork was by British cinematographer Robin Vidgeon.

== Plot summary ==
The opening credits end with: “This film is dedicated to the anonymous men and women interviewed by Henry Mayhew in London between 1848 and 1861.”

The movie's detailed evocation of life in Victorian London drew on Henry Mayhew's vast personal archive of detailed interviews and vivid descriptions, which first appeared in a series of articles in the Morning Chronicle newspaper and were later compiled into the book London Labour and the London Poor (1851).

The Fool is based on the thoughts and words of these street traders, beggars, artisans, thieves and performers of London on one hand, and on the letters and diaries of members of the upper classes on the other. The narrative is grounded in the double life of a humble clerk who poses as the reclusive, but widely respected "Sir John." He thus moves in wealthy upper class circles and participates in grand investment schemes while living in a London slum, showing the contrast between the world of the very poor and that of the very rich.

== Cast ==
- Derek Jacobi as Mr. Frederick / Sir John
- Cyril Cusack as The Ballad Seller
- Ruth Mitchell as The Girl
- Maria Aitken as Lady Amelia
- Irina Brook as Georgiana Shillibeer
- Paul Brooke as Lord Paramount
- Richard Caldicot as Duke
- James Cairncross as Mr. Trott
- Jim Carter as Mr. Blackthorn
- Jonathan Cecil as Sir Martin Locket
- Maria Charles as The Pure Gatherer
- Richard Clifford as George Locket
- James Cosmo as Mr. Bowring
- Rosalie Crutchley as Mrs. Harris
- Chris Darwin as Theatre Doorman
- Colleen Neary McClure as Beauty
- Michael Hordern as Mr. Tatham
- Stratford Johns as Arthur Shillibeer
- Preston Lockwood as Mr. Benjamin

== Production ==
Sands Films, the production company that made the film, is owned and run by Christine Edzard, the screenwriter and director, and her husband Richard B. Goodwin. Jacobi and Cusack had previously worked with Edzard on her film adaptation of Charles Dickens' Little Dorrit in 1987.

The film was the sixth made in collaboration with Goodwin by Edzard, who is known for her meticulous filmmaking, often based on Victorian English sources. Their earlier productions include Stories from a Flying Trunk (1979), The Nightingale (1981), Biddy (1983) and Little Dorrit (1987), and later films include As You Like It (1991), Amahl and the Night Visitors (1996), The IMAX Nutcracker (1997), The Children's Midsummer Night's Dream (2001) and The Good Soldier Schwejk (2018).

== Reception ==
Dennis Clunes described Edzard's colourful film as "an unsentimental satire of scandalous cross-classing" with alternating scenes of the high and low life of 1857 London, "evoking a "richly detailed Dickensian milieu."

Variety admired Edzard's “research and topnotch design with street characters based on interviews by 19th- century social journalist Henry Mayhew”, which were “fine on their own terms, right down to the dirt under their fingernails." But added “Edzard needs to make up her mind whether she’s building a museum or making a movie.”

Time Out was positive, comparing the film's “impeccable attention to detail” and the “socially-conscious” inspiration of Mayhew's work with that of Little Dorrit, while praising its “authentic period feel”. The reviewer found the premise of Mr. Frederick's double life “confusing” but admired the “intriguing...fine theatrical climax in which Jacobi turns on the representatives of True-Brit greed, tearing their selfishness to bits” and concluded that “Jacobi us as usual superb, well supported by a galaxy of British actors.”
