= John Dalby =

English singer, pianist and composer

John Leonard Burkitt Dalby (April 22, 1929 – July 13, 2017) was an English singer, pianist and composer.

Dalby was hailed in London and New York City for his witty and sophisticated cabaret performances. As an accomplished entertainer, he was described by one New York Theatre critic as a combination of "Noël Coward, Flanders and Swann with a touch of Quentin Crisp". He wrote and performed in numerous musicals and revues. In the West End, he succeeded Dudley Moore, in Beyond the Fringe, appeared in his own revue One in the Eye and appeared with Tom Conti, in An Italian Straw Hat. He worked with many notable performers, such as Bette Davis, Elizabeth Taylor, Angela Lansbury, David Niven, Alec Guinness and Evelyn Laye.

Dalby taught singing at the Actor's Richmond Company, which he formed into an admirable performing group and during his 70s he was musical director, arranger and helped compile programmes for the company "Muse & Music" which performed anthologies of poetry, prose and song at The Jermyn Street Theatre as well as various other venues for charities. His one-man show Colley Cibber - The Man Who Rewrote Shakespeare has been performed at the Royal National Theatre, the Jermyn Street Theatre and internationally. He presented a centenary tribute to Evelyn Laye, A Glass of Champagne, at the Jermyn Street Theatre in 2000.

Dalby died on 13 July 2017 at the age of 88.

== Filmography ==
Year	Title	Role	Notes
1979	Tales from a Flying Trunk	Queen Victoria	
1980	The Mirror Crack'd	Bandmaster	Uncredited
1983	Biddy	Mr. Tove	
1987	Little Dorrit	Mr. Jobling	(final film role)
