= As You Like It (1991 film) =

British film

- As You Like it (1991, film) DVD cover
- Directed by: Christine Edzard
- Based on: As You Like It by William Shakespeare
- Produced by: Olivier Stockman; George Reinhart
- Starring: James Fox; Cyril Cusack; Andrew Tiernan; Celia Bannerman; Emma Croft; Griff Rhys Jones; Roger Hammond; Don Henderson; Miriam Margolyes
- Cinematography: Robin Vidgeon
- Music by: Michel Sanvoisin
- Production company: Sands Films Ltd.
- Distributed by: Squirrel Films Distribution Ltd
- Release date: 1991
- Running time: 112 minutes
- Country: United Kingdom
- Language: English
- Budget: £1 million
- Box office: £12,000 (UK)

As You Like It is a 1991 British film based on the play As You Like It by William Shakespeare. It was devised, written and directed by Christine Edzard and produced by Olivier Stockman and George Reinhart.

The music is by Michel Sanvoisin and the film stars James Fox as Jacques, plus Cyril Cusack, Andrew Tiernan, Celia Bannerman, Emma Croft as Rosalind, Griff Rhys Jones as Touchstone, Roger Hammond, Don Henderson and Miriam Margolyes.

== Production ==
Sands Films, the production company that made the film, is owned and run by Christine Edzard, the screenwriter and director, and her husband Richard B. Goodwin.

As You Like It was a very low budget production filmed on an empty plot of land near Sands Films studios in Rotherhithe in the docklands of east London, which at that time was only partially reconstructed. Some of the cast members were known in British and Irish TV and theatre, but none had a high international profile except for James Fox.

It was the seventh collaboration between Goodwin and Edzard, who is known for her meticulous filmmaking, often based on Victorian English sources. Their earlier productions include Stories from a Flying Trunk (1979), The Nightingale (1981), Biddy (1983), Little Dorrit (1987) and The Fool (1990). Later productions include Amahl and the Night Visitors (1996), The IMAX Nutcracker (1997), The Children's Midsummer Night's Dream (2001) and The Good Soldier Schwejk (2018).

== Themes and Interpretations ==
The film follows director Christine Edzard's tradition of "working outside the artistic constraints...(of)...major commercial financing". In her version of As You Like It, set in an urban wasteland, "the weather is never kind", and the exiled live in tents and cardboard boxes reminiscent of the scenes of homelessness which characterised Britain when Margaret Thatcher was Prime Minister.

Relocating Shakespeare's original comedy to the corporate world of London, whose "blighted docklands" are a "trenchant condemnation of Thatcher's Britain", continues the engagement with "social malfeance and urban ills" that characterised the director's earlier films Little Dorrit (1987) and The Fool (1990). This pattern of innovation also reappears in Edzard's The Children's Midsummer Night's Dream (2001).

The film had a low budget of £800,000, a short shooting period of five weeks, and was made at independent Sands Films studio, with art-house distribution. In addition to its small and collaborative production team and non-commercial aims, As You Like It is an experimental, unconventional and challenging work which deliberately uses relocations in time and place to create a unique reproduction of Shakespeare's original play.

Like Edzard's version of Charles Dickens' Little Dorrit, this project uses the city as a metaphor, explores the complexities of double perspectives and focuses on societies at work. As the director explained though, the two films were also completely different. With Dickens "the truth of the character is in the nineteenth century, and the truth does not materialize until you start putting in all the detail", whereas, with Shakespeare, Edzard says "I don't believe that you can reach the sixteenth century in that sort of way. It's too remote: it would become an archaeological dig. The nineteenth century has a closeness to us in reproduction terms. The intention of the play is that it is a play and that it is meant to be rethought every time you do it. A film has to be as tightly rooted to its origins as is feasible, and it has to carry the message that the past has changed to us."

Edzard's philosophy explains the relocation of the film to the contemporary, urban setting of the 1990s, of the court to a corporate emporium and of the Forest of Arden to a wasteland. The relocation brings the two worlds of the 1590s and 1990s together through a shared vision of "national blight", corruption, and a shabby shallowness, in both of which the existence of and reaction to "buskers, beggars and...squatters" were familiar.

Edzard's As You Like It also self-consciously dramatises the threat to nature - a protective attitude that was not present in the sixteenth and seventeenth centuries. The forest is replaced with cellophane and the landscape is one of wasted, broken-down, urban surfaces which powerfully show a lack of respect for biodiversity.

== Reception ==
AllMovie.com described the film as a "modern-dress rendition of Shakespeare's famous "comedy"" which features more of the original dialogue than the 1936 film version. The reviewer suggested that while the "anachronistic modern settings" could be confusing for some viewers, others could enjoy "the interpretations...by some of the better performers" of British theatre in the 1990s.
