= Richard Goodwin (producer) =

British film producer

Richard B. Goodwin (born 13 September 1934) is a British film producer. As a producer, he received an Academy Award nomination for A Passage to India (1984). His other films include The Tales of Beatrix Potter (1971), Murder on the Orient Express (1974), Death on the Nile (1978), The Mirror Crack'd (1980), Evil Under the Sun (1982), Little Dorrit (1987), and Seven Years in Tibet (1997).

== Early years ==
Richard B. Goodwin grew up in India until the end of the war, attending boarding school in England.

== Career ==
Goodwin he joined the film industry as a teaboy at the Rank Organisation. Goodwin then spent his national service in the Malayan jungle, and joined the SAS in 1952. On his return to England, he turned down a place at Cambridge University to return to the film industry, as a military adviser on A Hill in Korea (1956), starring George Baker. By 1956, Goodwin had begun his long association with fellow producer John Brabourne. Brabourne hired him as a location manager for the film Harry Black, and later recalled: "although he was only 23, he had such a way with people that I knew he could do the job. He built the camp, found the tiger and did all those things." Together they were to make films for more than 35 years.

=== Producer ===
Goodwin's earliest credits are as a location and production manager, and after working as associate producer on Franco Zeffirelli's Romeo and Juliet (1968), he produced The Tales of Beatrix Potter (1971), featuring the Royal Ballet. John Brabourne's father in law, Lord Mountbatten, assisted in securing the film rights to several Agatha Christie novels, from Christie herself. Goodwin and Brabourne produced the first of their "all star" adaptations of Christie's novels with Murder on the Orient Express (1974). The film was a success, grossing $35 million from a budget of $1.9 million. Directed by Sidney Lumet, the cast included Albert Finney, Lauren Bacall, Sean Connery, and Ingrid Bergman. Death on the Nile (1978) with a cast headed by Peter Ustinov as Hercule Poirot with Maggie Smith, Angela Lansbury, Bette Davis, Mia Farrow, and David Niven. The later adaptions, The Mirror Crack'd (1980), and Evil Under the Sun (1982), received mixed reviews, and were disappointments at the box office.

In 1981, Goodwin and John Brabourne finally secured the rights to produce E. M. Forster's A Passage to India (1984). The partners persuaded David Lean to return to directing, after a 14-year hiatus. A Passage to India (1984) opened to positive notices, and received 11 Academy Award nominations, including for Best Picture, for which Goodwin and Brabourne were nominated as producers. They lost to Amadeus, but their feature film won two Oscars: Best Supporting Actress for Dame Peggy Ashcroft, and best music for Maurice Jarre.

Their next major project was Little Dorrit (1988). It was directed, and adapted from Charles Dickens’ novel, by Goodwin's wife, Christine Edzard. With a total running time of 6 hours, the film was released in 2 parts, and was well received by the critics. Little Dorrit was made entirely at Sands Films studios, established by Goodwin and his wife in the 1970s, in a Grade II listed, former granary at Rotherhithe, by the River Thames. Sands Films, their film and costume production company, continues to operate after nearly 40 years. Little Dorrit was the last film that John Brabourne and Goodwin made together. Goodwin's last major film, which he executive produced, was Seven Years in Tibet (1997) starring Brad Pitt and David Thewlis.

=== Television and writing ===
In the latter part of the 1980s, Goodwin turned his hand to a television series for Britain's Channel 4 and the American PBS, Leontyne by Barge from London to Vienna, about his international travels on a barge, called the Leontyne. An accompanying book, Leontyne, written by Goodwin, was published by Collins. Later, Goodwin went on to shoot and produce a collection of films, titled Barging Through Europe, on his travels, on another boat, the Regina, depicting the vanishing trades of France.

== Selected filmography ==
Goodwin worked on the following films:

Year	Title	Role
1960	Sink the Bismarck!	Special Effects Unit Manager
1962	H.M.S. Defiant	Production Manager
1963	An Evening with the Royal Ballet	Associate Producer
1964	King and Country	Associate Producer
1965	The Hollow Crown	Production Manager
1965	Othello	Associate Producer
1966	The Mikado	Associate Producer
1968	Romeo and Juliet	Associate Producer
1968	The Dance of Death	Associate Producer
1971	The Tales of Beatrix Potter	Producer; Screen Adaption
1975	Murder on the Orient Express	Producer
1977	The Little Match Girl	Director
1978	Death on the Nile	Producer
1979	Stories from a Flying Trunk	Producer
1981	The Mirror Crack'd	Producer
1981	The Nightingale	Director; Producer
1982	Evil Under the Sun	Producer
1983	Biddy	Producer
1984	Ingrid	Cast member
1985	A Passage to India	Producer
1987	Little Dorrit	Producer
1990	The Last Picture Show?	interviewee
1990	The Main to Regensburg	Director, Producer, Presenter
1990	Paris 'b'	Director
1990	Montbard to Mulhouse	Director
1990	Paris to Montbard	Director, Producer, Presenter
1990	Mulhouse to the Rhine	Director
1990	Paris 'a'	Director
1990	Vienna	Director, Producer, Presenter
1990	Danube	Director
1990	London to Calais	Director, Producer, Presenter
1990	Calais to Belgium	Director
1990	Regensberg to Grein	Director
1990	Fumay to Paris	Director
1990	Belgium to France	Director
1990	The Fool	Producer
1991	As You Like It	Executive Producer
1994	De Amor Y De Sombra	Producer
1997	Seven Years in Tibet	Executive producer
