= Little Dorrit (1987 film) =

- Theatrical release poster
- Directed by: Christine Edzard
- Screenplay by: Christine Edzard
- Based on: Little Dorrit by Charles Dickens
- Produced by: John Brabourne; Richard B. Goodwin
- Starring: Derek Jacobi; Sarah Pickering; Alec Guinness; Joan Greenwood; Max Wall; Patricia Hayes; Miriam Margolyes; Simon Dormandy
- Cinematography: Bruno de Keyzer
- Edited by: Fraser Maclean; Olivier Stockman
- Production company: Sands Films
- Distributed by: Curzon Film Distributors
- Release date: 11 December 1987; (UK)
- Running time: 357 minutes
- Country: United Kingdom
- Language: English
- Box office: $1,025,228

Little Dorrit is a 1987 film adaptation of the 1857 novel Little Dorrit by Charles Dickens. It was written and directed by Christine Edzard, and produced by John Brabourne and Richard B. Goodwin. The music by Giuseppe Verdi was arranged by Michael Sanvoisin.

The film stars Derek Jacobi as Arthur Clennam, Alec Guinness as William Dorrit, and Sarah Pickering in the title role. A huge cast of seasoned British and Irish stage and film actors was assembled to play the dozens of roles, including Simon Dormandy, Joan Greenwood, Roshan Seth, Miriam Margolyes, Cyril Cusack and Max Wall. Pickering, in contrast, had never acted on screen; she was cast after writing to the production team claiming to 'be' Little Dorrit. It remains her only screen acting role.

Little Dorrit lasts nearly six hours and was released in two parts, of approximately three hours each. The first part was subtitled Nobody's Fault, an allusion to one of Dickens' proposed titles for the original novel, and the story developed from the perspective and experiences of the Arthur Clennam character. The second film, titled Little Dorrit's Story, took many of the same events and presented them through the eyes of the heroine. Together they represented overlapping chronicles.

Sands Films, the production company that made the film, is run by Christine Edzard, the screenwriter and director, and her husband Richard B. Goodwin.

Little Dorrit was listed in the BFI's "ten great British films directed by women" in 2014.

== Plot ==
After returning to London after several years abroad, Arthur Clennam becomes involved in the problems of his mother's seamstress and those of her father in the Marshalsea debtors' prison.

== Production ==
This was the first screen adaptation of one of Dickens's longest and most complex books for over 50 years and featured three hundred of Britain's best character actors.

Director Christine Edzard is known for her meticulous filmmaking often based on Victorian English sources, and her version of Little Dorrit has been recognised for its faithfulness to the original text and for the innovativeness of its narrative. The film has 242 speaking roles and was made almost by hand at Edzard's and her husband producer Richard Goodwin's studio, Sands Films in London's docklands, where they have also made Stories from a Flying Trunk (1979), The Nightingale (1981), Biddy (1983), The Fool (1990), As You Like It (1991), Amahl and the Night Visitors (1996), The IMAX Nutcracker (1997), The Children's Midsummer Night's Dream (2001) and The Good Soldier Schwejk (2018).

Besides making films, the couple manufactured dolls houses and the sets that were built on site, where the hundreds of costumes were also sewn, were made using miniature models of houses combined with special effects to create the Victorian London background. The elaborate sets constructed included Marshalsea Prison, interiors of well to-do or neglected houses and the busy streets and dock areas of London. Designer Rostislav Doboujinsky worked on the film's sets, and on Mrs. Merdle's parrot.

The budget was only $9 million and the pink Sèvres china seen on Merdle's dinner-table, which would have been too expensive to rent or to buy, was made in the small pottery at the studios.

BFI's Screenonline described the filmmaking in detail:

Filmed mainly in close and medium shot, its scenes tend to focus intently on one or two characters, the dark interiors and moody lighting evoking a sense of oppression. The theatricality and stylisation are quite deliberate, signalled by Edzard's choice of Verdi for the music soundtrack, full of tragic grandeur and operatic fatalism, but used sparingly, along with birdsong, ticking clocks, and faint sounds from outside.

In the eerily quiet interior scenes a tiny movement or gesture, like dropping a shawl, can have a seismic effect. Occasionally, the long conversation pieces are broken, quite brilliantly, by sudden bursts of activity in the wider world - the print shops around St. Paul's, the bridge where Amy meets Arthur, the public areas of the Marshalsea - where a noisy, purposeful crowd will appear, bustling before the fixed camera. It's a simple, effective way of conjuring up the life of the Victorian city.

Alec Guinness' portrayal of William Dorrit is considered by some to be one of his best starring roles after the 1960s and, along with his role in the TV dramatisation of John LeCarre's Tinker, Tailor, Soldier, Spy, has been described as "effectively his screen monument". It was the final film of actress Joan Greenwood, who died after a long and successful acting career in 1987, the year of the film's release.

The Region Two DVD was released in the UK on 27 October 2008.

== Themes and interpretations ==
Little Dorrit continues Edzard's tradition of working beyond the artistic constraints that come with major commercial funding. The six-hour length and two-part structure defy box-office norms and, unlike the pictorialism of more typical British period filmmaking, this is not a seductive version of Victorian England. Instead the film's streets are authentically "roaring" - full of people and objects

The director "wanted to avoid the exaggerative, the melodramatic and the sentimental". Some thought her omittance of the novel's melodramatic character – Rigaud – was a serious one which ran the risk of reducing Dickens' allegorical dialectic of good and evil to simply a satire with a love story. However, Edzard was able to reintroduce Rigaud's evil through the character of Merdle and in the way that the ruthlessness of the Circumlocution Office is represented.

In Edzard's "calmly feminist" film, the novel's character of financier Merdle is pushed into the background while the director uses, in an ironic reversal of Merdle's patriarchal role, his wife to speak for him. She allows only his influence to be felt through the "riotous lack of appreciation of the deleterious effects of capitalism throughout various strata of Victorian society."

== Reception ==
Little Dorrit was critically acclaimed and was nominated for two Oscars: Actor in a Supporting Role (Alec Guinness), and Writing (Screenplay Based on Material from Another Medium) (Christine Edzard). Miriam Margolyes was runner-up for the LA Critics Circle Award for Best Supporting Actress for her role as Flora Finching. The film received two nominations for the BAFTA Awards 1988: Best Screenplay – Adapted, and Best Costume Design, and one for the Golden Globes (USA) 1989: Best Performance by an Actor in a Supporting Role. Derek Jacobi won the Evening Standard Award for Best Actor in 1987.

Roger Ebert gave the film 4 out of 4 stars, describing it as an "epic" that is "so filled with characters, so rich in incident, that it has the expansive, luxurious feel of a Victorian novel." He praised the film's double perspective which creates "a real romantic tension", and was positive about the length of the film at six hours for both providing a rhythm and timing in which the viewer can "lose (their) moorings" and adding "tremendous weight to the love story."

For the Los Angeles Times the film was "pure astonishment, start to finish. We have never had Dickens with the sweep and perfection of "Little Dorrit," nor one so shatteringly relevant" and "among its many virtues are such a nonchalant array of the cream of British actors as to verge on the indecent". The reviewer praised the director for reflecting "Margaret's Thatcher England better than most", adding "how timely great Dickens can be--or can be in the hands of a great director... for many, the discovery of Christine Edzard, the film's writer-director, will be as potent a find as the novel itself", and "her gift is to bring the evils of the period alive to us, until, through the horrid buzz of the Marshalsea flies, the unending dripping of water, we feel the clammy constriction of the place in our very bones." Camerawork by Bruno de Keyzer was also praised for travelling "with such empathy across the pinched faces of the poor".

Variety noted that "what she (Edzard) has accomplished on a small budget is astounding" and described Alec Guinness's 'William Dorrit' and Derek Jacobi's 'Arthur Clennan' as "quite brilliant." The reviewer thought the film's six hours running time allowed for "full characterization and depth of story", adding that the way the film tells the same story through two different characters "allows charming reinterpretations of certain scenes", presenting "a fully rounded piece as never usually found in the cinema." The painted sets were also mentioned for providing "rich theatrical texture while not deflecting from the story."

The New York Times wrote "The cast is spectacular" and "The film's physical production must be one of the handsomest, most evocative ever given a Dickens novel, and the performances, by some of Britain's finest character actors, are as rich in baroque detail as anyone could hope". The reviewer found the repetition of the double perspective "exhausting", but concluded "One must cherish the late Joan Greenwood as Arthur's terrible mother; Miriam Margolyes as Flora Finching (who speaks in woozily hilarious, nonstop paragraphs instead of phrases or even sentences);... Roshan Seth as the rent collector, Pancks, and Eleanor Bron as Mrs. Merdle, the social-climbing wife of Britain's financial wizard-of-the-moment.

Time Out commented "Little Dorrit is about lucre – filthy and otherwise – so Christine Edzard's masterful two part adaptation of Dickens's novel has a peculiar relevance for today", adding: "Besides the excitement of the story, the chief delight of this epic production lies in the superb performances, which manage to convey Dickens' penchant for the grotesque while suggesting the inner life that many critics deny exists in the novel. Impressive camerawork and Verdi's music help make the six hours roll by far too quickly."

Halliwell's Film Guide described the film as a "faithful" and authentic adaptation of the Dickens original, "lovingly made" on a small budget with the "starry cast giving their all", noting that it was "adored by audiences who could take the length".

== Full cast ==
- Derek Jacobi as Arthur Clennam
- Sarah Pickering as Little Dorrit
- Alec Guinness as William Dorrit
- Joan Greenwood as Mrs. Clennam
- Max Wall as Jeremiah Flintwinch
- Patricia Hayes as Affery Flintwinch
- Cyril Cusack as Frederick Dorrit
- Amelda Brown as Fanny Dorrit
- Daniel Chatto as Tip Dorrit
- Miriam Margolyes as Flora Finching
- Robert Morley as Lord Decimus Barnacle
- Bill Fraser as Mr. Casby
- Roshan Seth as Mr. Pancks
- John McEnery as Captain Hopkins
- Mollie Maureen as Mr. F.'s Aunt
- Diana Malin as Mr. Casby's Maid
- Pauline Quirke as Maggy
- Luke Duckett as Young Arthur

In addition, minor roles were played by: Michael Elphick, Arthur Blake, Eleanor Bron, Heathcote Williams, John Savident, Betty Marsden, Liz Smith, Brian Pettifer, Kathy Staff, Ian Hogg, Tony Jay, Julia Lang, Christopher Hancock, Malcolm Tierney, John Warner, Harold Innocent, Edward Burnham, Gerald Campion, Nadia Chambers and David Thewlis.

== See also ==
- List of longest films
