= Christine Edzard =

Film director, writer, and costume designer

Christine Edzard (born 15 February 1945) is a film director, writer, and costume designer, nominated for BAFTA and Oscar awards for her screenwriting. She has been based in London for most of her career, where she co-founded Sands Films.

== Early life ==
Edzard was born and raised in Paris by her German-born father, Dietz Edzard, and Polish mother, Suzanne Eisendieck, both painters. After a degree in economics she trained as a set and costume designer with Lila De Nobili and Rostislav Doboujinsky. She assisted Di Nobili on Franco Zeffirelli's productions of Aida and Romeo and Juliet at La Scala in 1963 and 1968.

== Career ==
Edzard co-wrote and designed the film The Tales of Beatrix Potter (1971), for which she was nominated for two BAFTA awards for Best Costume Design and Best Art Direction.

With her husband, the film producer Richard B. Goodwin, she founded the Sands Films studio and production company in Rotherhithe, London in 1975. The studios include the Rotherhithe Picture Research Library, a free resource for the general public, and the building was awarded a Blue Plaque in 2009, unveiled in January that year by Derek Jacobi. Over the years Sands Films has made and supplied period costumes for international film and TV productions.

Edzard is best known for her film adaptation of Charles Dickens's novel, Little Dorrit (1988), a British film for which she was nominated for an Oscar, a BAFTA Award, and a Los Angeles Film Critics Award.

== Director and writer filmography ==
- The Man with the Plan (2026) which stars Simon Callow as William Beveridge and comedian Mark Thomas as the Narrator.
- The Good Soldier Schwejk (2018) direction, screenplay
- The Children's Midsummer Night's Dream (2001) (direction, design)
- The IMAX Nutcracker (1997) (screenplay, design, direction)
- Amahl and the Night Visitors (1996) - filmed opera by Gian Carlo Menotti (direction, set and costume design)
- As You Like It (1991) (direction, design)
- The Fool (1990) (screenplay adapted from Henry Mayhew, design, direction)
- Little Dorrit (1987) (screenplay, direction, design)
- Biddy (1983) (screenplay, direction)
- The Nightingale (1981) (screenplay, direction)
- Stories from a Flying Trunk (1979) (three short films, Little Ida (1975), The Kitchen (1975) and The Little Match Girl (1975))
- The Tales of Beatrix Potter (1971)
