= Spirit (supernatural entity) =

Immaterial being or supernatural agent

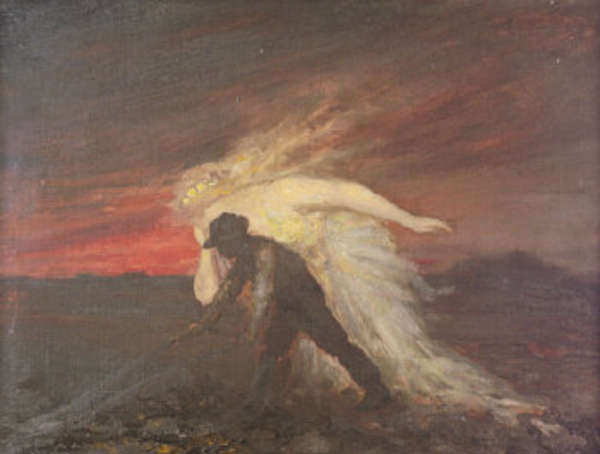
The Plough and the Spirit of the Earth, painting by George William Russell

In folklore and ethnography, a spirit is an "immaterial being", "supernatural agent", the "soul of a person", an "invisible entity", or the "soul of a seriously suffering person". Often spirits have an intermediate status between gods and humans, sharing some properties with gods (Incorporeality, greater powers) and some with humans (finite, not omniscience).

Thus, a spirit would have a form of existing and thinking; it would exist without being generally visible; often popular traditions endow it with miraculous powers and more or less occult influences on the physical world.

== Western Thought ==
=== Ancient period ===
==== Greeks ====
In his Theogony, written in the seventh century BC, Hesiod distinguishes five categories of powers: superior demons or gods (golden race), inferior demons (silver race), deceased from the Hades (bronze race), heroes without posthumous promotion, and humans of the past (iron race).

Hesiod was the first to set forth clearly and distinctly four classes of rational beings: gods, demigods, heroes, in this order, and, last of all, men; and as a sequence to this he postulates his transmutation, the golden race passing selectively into many good divinities, and the demigods into heroes.

— Plutarch, The Obsolescence of Oracles", 10: Pythian dialogues, Garnier-Flammarion, 2006, 161.

Pythagoras sees souls or spirits everywhere, as detached particles of the ether:

The whole air is full of souls which are called genii or heroes.

— Diogenes Laertius, VIII, 32, Pocket-sized book, 966

Pythagoras identifies four types of spiritual beings: gods, heroes, demons, and humans. While the gods are immortal souls, the humans are mortal souls. Gods inhabit the stars, glorious heroes inhabit the ether, and demons inhabit the earth. The heroes are the demigods.

First worship the Immortal Gods, as they are established and ordained by the Law.

Reverence the Oath, and next the Heroes, full of goodness and light.
Honor likewise the Terrestrial Dæmons by rendering them the worship lawfully due to them.

Honour likewise thy parents, and those most nearly related to thee.

— The Golden Verses of Pythagoras, 1-4

A little bit similar to Hesiod, in Timaeus, Plato mentions gods, demons, inhabitants in the Hades, heroes and humans of the past.

==== Romans ====
The Romans admitted gods, goddesses, manes (souls of the friendly dead), lares (tutelary spirits protecting houses, etc.), genies (spirits presiding over the destiny of a place, a group, or an individual), lemures (malignant specters of the dead), etc.

Theologians began thinking of angels in the third century, with Origen and the Cappadocians (Gregory of Nazianzus, Gregory of Nyssa, Basil of Caesarea).

The Neoplatonist Porphyry of Tyre (c. 260) carefully asks how to distinguish high-ranking divine beings (gods, archangels, angels, demons, heroes, archons of the cosmos or matter) from mere souls, not to mention malignant spirits (antitheoi):

Thou inquirest concerning what reveals the presence of a god, an angel, an archangel, a demon, or some archon [planetary governor] or soul. In a word, I pronounce that manifestations accord with their essences, powers, and activities ... Of a single kind are the appearances of the gods; those of the demons are varied; those of the angels, simpler than those of the demons, but inferior to those of the gods; those of the archangels, closer to divine causes; as for those of the archons, if by that thou meanest the masters of the world who administer the sublunary elements, they are varied, but arranged in order.

Pagan angels and archangels have Persian origin.

Saint Augustine equates angels with uncreated light, born of the Word; he believes that demons have celestial bodies; he considers fauns to be monstrous children between women and devils.

In the fifth century, Martianus Capella described a world inhabited by spirits, satyrs, etc:

The places inaccessible to men are populated by a crowd of Longaevi who inhabit the forests, woods and sylvan sanctuaries, lakes, springs and rivers.

— De nuptiis Philologiae et Mercurii ("On the Marriage of Philology and Mercury"), II, 35.

In his Commentary on Timaeus (439), Proclus admits nine levels of reality: One, being, life, mind, reason, animals, plants, animate beings, and prime matter. According to Pierre Hadot, Proclus posits a hierarchy of gods in nine degrees:

(1) the One, the first god
(2) the henads
(3) the intelligible gods
(4) the intelligible-intellective gods
(5) the intellective gods
(6) the hyper cosmic gods
(7) the encosmic gods
(8) the universal souls
(9) the angels, demons, heroes

Pseudo-Dionysius the Areopagite, c. 490, influenced by Proclos and Saint Paul, classified the heavenly spirits into three triads, thus forming the nine heavenly choirs (from top to bottom): Seraphim, Cherubim, Thrones, Lordships, Powers, Dominions, Principalities, Archangels, and Angels.

=== Middle Age ===
Michel Psellos, a great Byzantine scholar of the 12th century, lists six categories of demons in a famous treatise used by Ronsard: Treated by energy dialogue or devil's operation (translated 1511). His categories are: igneous spirits, aerial spirits, terrestrial spirits, aquatic spirits, subterranean spirits, and tenebrous spirits.

Honorius Augustodunensis (1075-1157), in his Elucidarium, admits the existence of spirits such as angels, demons, and disembodied souls. He argues that "angels have bodies of ether, demons of air, humans of earth".

In his prose novel Merlin (7th to 8th century), Robert de Boron introduces his heroes as children of a virgin and a devil, who is therefore an incubus, a sexual demon.

The novel Huon de Bordeaux (early 13th century) mixes two categories of spirits: the spirits spoken of by theologians (angels, demons, etc.), and the spirits spoken of by storytellers (dwarfs, giants, ogres, evil animals, etc).

In 1398, 1241, 1270 and 1277, the Paris Faculty of Theology condemned the thesis that other eternal entities existed in addition to God.

=== Renaissance ===
Paracelsus counts seven races of soulless creatures: the human-shaped but soulless and spiritless genii (inanimata) of the Elements, the giants and dwarfs, and the dwarfs on Earth.

He believes in the genies of the four Elements. Earth, by spontaneous generation, produces pygmies guarding the treasures beneath the mountain; water produces undines; fire, salamanders; air, sylphs. Then there are the giants who come from the air but live on the earth, and the dwarfs who come from below the earth but sometimes venture above it. The book is called A Book on Nymphs, Sylphs, Pygmies, and Salamanders, and on the Other Spirits (Latin: Liber de Nymphis, sylphis, pygmaeis et salamandris et de caeteris spiritibus).

The word inanimatum designates six families of soulless men... These soulless men are first and foremost those of the four families who inhabit the four Elements: the nymphs, nymphae, daughters of the water; the sons of the earth, lemurs, who dwell beneath the mountains; the spirits of the air, gnomi; the genii of fire, vulcani. The other two families are made up of men who were also born without souls, but who, like us, breathe outside the Elements. These are, on the one hand, the giants and, on the other, the dwarfs who live in the shadows of the forests, umbragines... Some beings naturally remain within the same Element. The phoenix, for example, stands in the fire like the mole in your earth. Do not be disbelievers, I will prove it! As for the giants and dwarves of the forest, they live in our world. All these soulless beings are produced from seeds that come from heaven and the Elements but without the loam of the earth... They come into the world like insects formed in the mire [by spontaneous generation].

— Paracelsus, Great Astronomy. Astronomia magna (1537), trad. In French, Derby, 2000, 159-160.

The Germans developed an "astonishing proliferation of supernatural creatures:" primordial giants (who personified "the great supernatural forces"), dwarves (who "are the dead"), elves (alves), trölls ("gigantic dead"), landvaettir ("tutelary deities of places"), disir, fylgja ("female figure following or accompanying each human being and embodies his destiny"), hamr ("form that everyone carries and which escapes from its support"), hamingja (form applied to the entire family), hugr ("spirit of the world").

Johann Weyer is a witchcraft specialist, with his De praestigiis daemonorum ac incantationibus (1563). He classifies demons by their elemental nature (fire, water, air, earth, and subterranean), and by their habitat (demons of the four cardinal points, day and night demons, wood demons, mountain demons, country demons, domestic demons).

=== 17th and subsequent centuries ===
In his novel The Count of Gabalis, or Interviews on the Secret Sciences (1670), Abbé Henri de Montfaucon de Villars correlates demons and elements, simplifying Psellus and continuing Paracelsus. Sylphs are of air; undines, water; gnomes, earth; salamanders, fire.

The air is full of an innumerable multitude of peoples [Sylphs] of human figure, a little proud in appearance, but docile indeed: great lovers of the sciences, subtle, officious to the wise, and enemies of the foolish and ignorant. Their wives and daughters are male beauties, such as the Amazons are depicted... Know that the seas and rivers are inhabited as well as the air; the ancient Sages named Ondins or Nymphs this species of people... The earth is filled almost to the center with Gnomes, people of small stature, guardians of treasures, mines, and gems. As for the salamanders, fiery inhabitants of the region of fire, they serve the philosophers.

— Henri de Montfaucon de Villars, The Count of Gabalis, or Interviews on the Secret Sciences, p. 45-48.

Creature	Element by Paracelsus	Element by Abbé de Villars
Undine	Water	Water
Gnome	Earth	Earth
Salamander	Fire	Fire
Phoenix	Fire
Elf	Air
Sylph		Air
Nymph		Water

Rationalist Descartes uses the physiological term "animal spirits" to refer to corpuscles composed of the "most vivid and subtle" parts of the blood, which move the body as they circulate from brain to muscle (Discours de la méthode, V) (1637). These are not entities, then; they are nerve impulses.

In the spiritualism codified by Allan Kardec, the word "spirits" denotes the souls of the deceased with whom a medium can communicate. Kardec's first book is entitled: The Spirits Book, which contain the principles of Spiritist doctrine on the immortality of the soul, the nature of spirits and their relationship with mankind; moral laws, the present life, the future life and the future of mankind. According to the teachings given by the Higher Spirits through various mediums collected and organized by Allan Kardec (1857), he affirms:

Spirits temporarily assume a perishable material envelope, the destruction of which, by death, restores them to liberty. Among the different species of corporeal beings, God has chosen the human species for the incarnation of spirits arrived at a certain degree of development; it is which gives it a moral and intellectual superiority to all the others. The soul is an incarnated spirit, whose body is only its envelope. There are in man three things: 1. The body, or material being, analogous to the animals, and animated by the same vital principle; 2. The soul, or immaterial being, a spirit incarnated in the body; 3. The link which unites the soul and the body, a principle intermediary between matter and spirit.

Edward Tylor, one of the founders of anthropology, introduced the concept of animism in 1871 to provide, according to him, "a rudimentary definition of religion," and he posits "the minimal definition of religion as the belief in spiritual beings, within the framework of evolutionism:"

I purpose here, under the name of Animism, to investigate the deep-lying doctrine of Spiritual Beings… Animism characterizes tribes very low in the scale of humanity, and thence ascends (...) into the midst of high modern culture.

== Outside the West ==
=== Sub-Saharan Africa ===
According to Pierre Alexandre, in Sub-Saharan Africa:

the somewhat vague term 'spirit' is used to designate a whole collection of immaterial entities, generally possessing a certain number of the attributes of the human person, but not all, and, first of all, no concrete bodily envelope... First of all, the 'spirits of the dead'... Another widespread category is that of 'bush spirits', frequent personifications of the forces of nature... Sahara, the fried (dangerous). 'Genies' are a category that often combines the other two: sometimes a dead person can become a genie. They are more personalized than nature spirits... Ecumenical religions have added a few new ones —angels, Djinn, Ifrit, demons— to the catalog of African spirits.

For Ernst Dammann, in addition to nature spirits, which consist of "a large number of protective spirits of houses, settlements, professions, and social classes", there are "animal spirits" (e.g. spirits attached to giraffes among the Nuer), "auxiliary spirits" ("found in drums, gourds, baskets, etc."), and certain civilizing heroes.

=== North America ===
==== Haiti ====
In Haiti (voodoo):

It is difficult to construct a voodoo theology. The spirits, large and small, invade the ceremonies, capturing all the attention of the faithful. Some are ancient African divinities who have retained their prestige, while others, with their fallible personalities, deserve only the name of genies or demons. These supernatural beings, whose worship is the essential object of voodoo, are called lwa, 'mysteries' and, in northern Haiti, 'saints' or 'angels'. Alongside them are the Twins, who wield great power, and the 'dead', who demand sacrifices and offerings and exert a direct influence on the fate of the living.

==== Native Americans ====
Concerning the Amerindians, according to A. Métraux:

Some information has been gathered in the tropics about a maize spirit. There is another spirit in these regions, that of the cassava. East of the Andes, the Indians possess a luxuriant flora of plant spirits. South America's "bush spirits" are partly woodland genies, partly spirits of particular trees. The religion of the South American Indians of the tropics is characterized in particular by the abundant ramification of belief in spirits.

Most spirits are represented in human form, with somewhat monstrous features: they may be hairy, or have prominent eyebrows, or two heads; they may have no knee joints, or stick together like Siamese twins. Sometimes they look like skeletons or skulls.

In principle, the same representations are found in North America, although they do not dominate religion there to the same degree as in the tropical jungles of South America. Belief in a personal tutelary genie, which can be inherited or acquired through a vision, and which in some cases can be bought or sold, exists in both Americas.

In Mesoamerica, the nahual, both human and animal (or divine), is a tutelar deity.

Among the Lakota, the practice of vision questing enables them to communicate with the spirits.

== History in Asia ==
=== Japan ===
In Japan: kami:

In the Shinto cults, the original religion of the Japanese, kami is used to designate all divine spirits, considered "superior" to human condition. According to tradition, they are said to number 88 million (a figure indicating infinity). Shinto mythology distinguishes several kinds of kami, those reputedly "celestial" (amatsu-kami) like Amaterasu Omikami, and those qualified as "terrestrial" (kunitsu-kami) like Okuninushi no Mikoto. Beings of exceptional status, divinized after death, such as Sugawara no Michizane or Ojin Tenno, are also considered kami... Furthermore, kami, who are normally venerated (not worshiped) in shrines, may inhabit natural sites, rocks, mountains, rivers, etc., and protect mountains (yama no kami), fields (ta no kami), or paths (sae no kami). These "earthly kami" thus reside in the world.

=== Mesopotamia ===
In Mesopotamia, the Assyro-Babylonians admitted gods (ilum), planetary genies, ancestral gods (ilû abbêni), personal gods (ilîni), spirits of the dead (etemmû), and numerous demons (udug).

=== Mongolia ===
In Mongolia (the case of the Buryats): Specialists in Mongolian shamanism have proposed "a classification of the various entities inhabiting the supernature of the Mongols."

The Mongolian Buryats admit: tenger (atmospheric skies and the spirits that reside there), ancestors (masters of places and waters), zajaan (spirits of the deceased victims of unnatural death), and spirits from the souls of the dead. In addition, shamans know: auxiliaries (zoomorphic and protective spirits), udxa (the shaman's protective spirits seen collectively as a shamanic lineage or ancestry), troublemakers (ongon), wandering souls of the recently dead, mythical founders and legendary ancestors (such as Buxa Nojon, Dajan Deerx), local master-spirits (of the forest or a locality).

=== Siberia ===
In Siberia (the case of the Tungus), in the context of shamanism and even "before the establishment of shamanism", "master spirits are the 'masters' of certain animal species, of territories where game roosts, of natural phenomena such as fire, lightning, wind, etc."

The Tungus address various spirits, without the intermediary of the shaman: fire master-spirits, forest master-spirits, water master-spirits, clan territories master-spirits, sites master-spirits, and mythical territories master-spirits. The Tungus shaman, on the other hand, addresses shamanic spirits: shamanic ancestors, zoomorphic spirits serving the shaman, spirits likely to be mastered by the shaman (which excludes the great celestial deity and the master spirits of fire, forest, and water).

== In religion ==
=== Buddhism ===
In Theravada Buddhism, there are up to 31 planes of existence with, from the lowest to the highest: beings of the underworld, hungry spirits (petâ), demigods (asurâ), deities (devâ), including Brahmâ (in planes 12-14). In addition, there are minor earthly deities such as genies (yakkhâ and yakkhinî), snakes (Nâgâ), spirits associated with nature, or spirits of ancestors or Indian gods, local gods, and mythological or historical heroes.

Tibetan Buddhism classifies "nature spirits into eight types of being: minor gods, lords of death, harmful demons, wrathful mothers, rock demons, king-spirits, spirits of natural wealth and water spirits."

=== Christianity ===
Christian theologians regard spirits as demons, fallen angels. Saint Augustine likened the demons of Greco-Roman paganism to fallen angels, rebelling against divine authority and wishing to lead man into evil.

== Interpretation ==
Auguste Comte's positivism, according to his law of three stages, brings belief in spirits into the most remote era or conception, that of the theological stage, more precisely into its second phase, polytheism, where "life is finally withdrawn from material objects, to be mysteriously transported to various fictitious beings, usually invisible, whose continuous active intervention henceforth becomes the source of all external phenomena, and even then of human phenomena".

== See also ==
=== Spiritual entities ===
- Angel
- Deity
- Demon
- Elemental
- Elf
- Fairy
- Gnome
- Nymph
- Salamander
- Tutelary deity
- Undine

=== Beliefs and practices ===
- Animism
- Espiritismo
- Shamanism
- Spiritualism (beliefs)
- Spiritualism (movement)
- Theurgy

== Bibliography ==
- l'Aréopagite, Pseudo-Denys (1958). Hiérarchie céleste. Sources chrétiennes (in French). Le Cerf.
- Psellos, Michel (1511). "De la puissance des démons". Traité par dialogue de l'énergie ou opération des diables (in French).
- Bekker, Balthasar (1694). Le monde enchanté, ou examen des communs sentiments touchant les esprits, leur nature, leur pouvoir, leur administration et leurs opérations (1691) (in French). Vol. 4. Translated by Weereld, De Betovere. Amsterdam.
- Calmet, Dom Augustin (1751). Traité sur les apparitions des esprits et sur les vampires ou revenants de Hongrie, de Moravie, etc. (1746) (in French). Vol. 2 (2nd ed.). pp. XXII-486 and X-483.
- Vacant, A; Mangenot, E. (dir.) (1903–1950). Dictionnaire de théologie catholique (in French). Vol. 30 (Letouzey ed.).
- Frazer, James George (1911–1915). "IX: Le culte des arbres". Le Rameau d'or. Bouquins (in French). Translated by Laffont, Robert. pp. 268-289 (tree spirits), 289-296 (beneficial powers of tree spirits).
- Thompson, S. (1932–1936). Motif-index of the folk literature. Vol. 6. Indiana: Bloomington.
- Viller, M. (1937). Dictionnaire de spiritualité ascétique et mystique (in French) (Beauchesne ed.).
- Fourche-Tiarko, J. A.; Morlighem, H (1939). Les communications des indigènes du Kasaï avec les âmes des morts (in French). Brussels: Institut royal colonial belge.
- Van der Toorn, Karel; Becking, Bob; Van der Horst, Pieter Willem (1995). Dictionary of deities and demons in the Bible (DDD). Brill. p. XXXVI-1774.
- Riffard, P. A. (2008). Nouveau dictionnaire de l'ésotérisme (in French). Payot. pp. 111–115.
