= At the Sign of the Reine Pédauque =

1893 novel by Anatole France

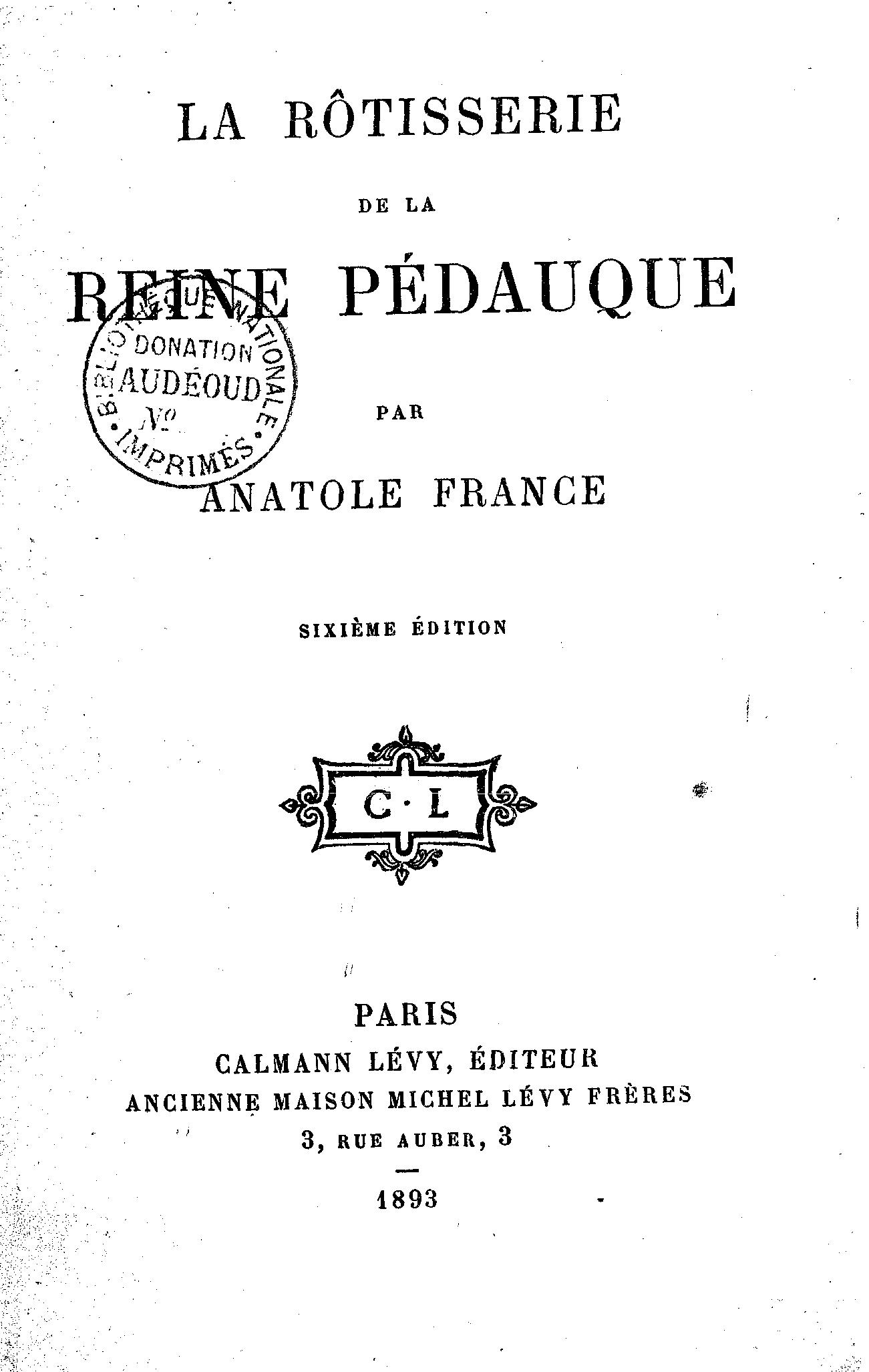
- Author: Anatole France
- Original title: La Rôtisserie de la reine Pédauque
- Language: French
- Published: 1893
- Publication place: France
- Pages: 388
- Original text: La Rôtisserie de la reine Pédauque at French Wikisource

At the Sign of the Reine Pédauque (French: La Rôtisserie de la reine Pédauque) is a historical novel by Anatole France, written in 1892 and published the next year. The novel tells of the tribulations of the young Jacques Ménétrier at the beginning of the 18th century. Its most important source is the 17th-century occult text Comte de Gabalis.

== Summary ==
Jacques Ménétrier is the son of Léonard Ménétrier, leader of a brotherhood of roast meat sellers. Somewhat educated by Brother Ange, a dissolute Capuchin, Jacques replaces the dog Miraut in his job of turning the spit on which the chickens roast. He is soon taken under the protection of Mr. Jérôme Coignard, an abbot, who rebaptizes him "the learned Jacobus Tournebroche" and teaches him Latin and Greek. The two of them are hired by Mr. d'Astarac, an alchemist researching salamanders and sylphs in the works of ancient authors.

The rants of d'Astarac, the debauchery of Mr. d'Anquetil, and the vengeance of the uncle of the beautiful Jahel result in the happiness destined for the master and student, Jérôme and Jacques.

== Adaptations ==
Composer Charles-Gaston Levadé adapted the novel into a four-act lyric comic opera in 1934. Tenor Jean Marny of the Opéra-Comique recorded an aria from the work, "Rêverie de Jacques", on Pathé sapphire disc 3175.

Traktér u královny Pedauky (1967) is a Czechoslovak television film directed by Zdeněk Kaloč, starring Josef Karlík, Leopold Franc, Libuše Geprtová and Václav Postránecký. Running time 84 min.

La rôtisserie de la reine Pédauque (1975) is a French television film directed by Jean-Paul Carrère, starring Georges Wilson, Didier Haudepin and Pierre Doris. Running time 99 min.
