= A Book on Nymphs, Sylphs, Pygmies, and Salamanders, and on the Other Spirits =

1566 essay by Paracelsus

A Book on Nymphs, Sylphs, Pygmies, and Salamanders, and on the Other Spirits (Latin: Ex Libro de Nymphis, Sylvanis, Pygmaeis, Salamandris et Gigantibus, etc) is a treatise by the Swiss lay theologian and philosopher Paracelsus, published posthumously in 1566. It is about elemental beings and their place in a Christian cosmology.

== Background ==
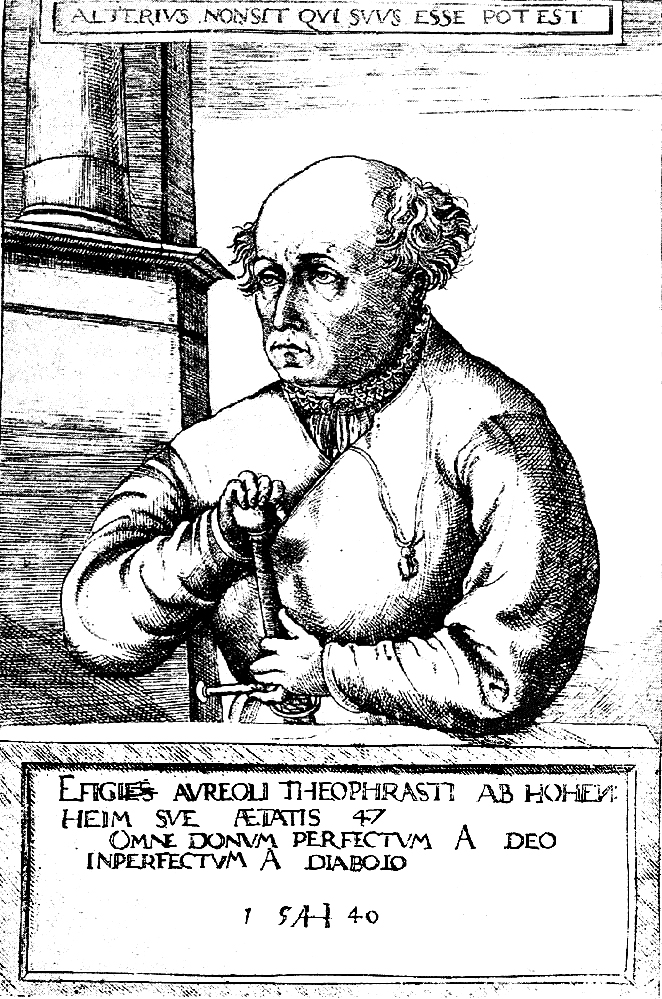
Paracelsus, portrait from 1540 by Augustin Hirschvogel

A Book on Nymphs, Sylphs, Pygmies, and Salamanders, and on the Other Spirits was written by Paracelsus (1493/1494 – 1541) late in his life, but it is not known what exact year it is from. The descriptions of elemental beings are based on various ancient and traditional sources, which the author adapted and reinterpreted.

== Summary ==
Paracelsus argues from his reading of the Biblical creation narrative that man needs to use philosophy to gain knowledge about the natural world, or he will not be able to understand Christ and appreciate the Bible. The natural world contains many strange things, including elemental beings corresponding to the four classical elements. These he calls spirit-men, and he gives several names for each.

Those who live in water, he calls nymphs, water people, or undines. Those who live in air, he calls forest people, sylvestres, sylphs, air people, or wind people. Those who live in earth, he calls mountain people, earth men, gnomes, or pygmies. Those who live in fire, he calls salamanders, fire people, aetnans (a name that references Mount Etna), or vulcans.

He dismisses the conventional Christian view that elemental beings are devils, instead arguing that they are significant parts of God's creation, and studies them like he studied the rest of the natural world.

Each of the four types of people can give birth to monsters. Paracelsus makes an analogy between this and the then-popular belief that comets were a special form of a star.

The monsters can take many forms, and like comets they are powerful omens. Monsters produced by the Nymphs include sirens and sea monks. Giants are monsters from the sylphs, while Will-o'-the-wisps are from the vulcans, and dwarfs are from the mountain people. He writes that will-o-the-wisps signify the destruction of the monarchy, giants signify great disasters, dwarfs signify poverty among the people, and Sirens the downfall of princes and lords, or the rise of sects or factions.

== Publication ==
Like Paracelsus' other theological works, A Book on Nymphs was published posthumously, first appearing as a separate print in 1566 and the year after in a collection of the author's philosophical writings. After that it has appeared in a number of collections of Paracelsus' works. An English translation by Henry E. Sigherist appears in Four Treatises of Theophrastus von Hohenheim Called Paracelsus, published by Johns Hopkins University Press in 1941 and republished in 1996.

== Legacy ==
The fairy-tale like quality of the treatise has made it a popular source of inspiration for poets and fiction writers. It was the main source for the descriptions of elementals in the 1670 work Comte de Gabalis, which in turn has influenced writers such as Alexander Pope, Friedrich de la Motte Fouqué, Charles Baudelaire and Anatole France. The dramatist Jean Giraudoux explicitly states his debt to Paracelsus in the preface to his 1938 play Ondine.
