= Statue of Jonathan Trumbull =

Statue in the U.S. Capitol

Jonathan Trumbull
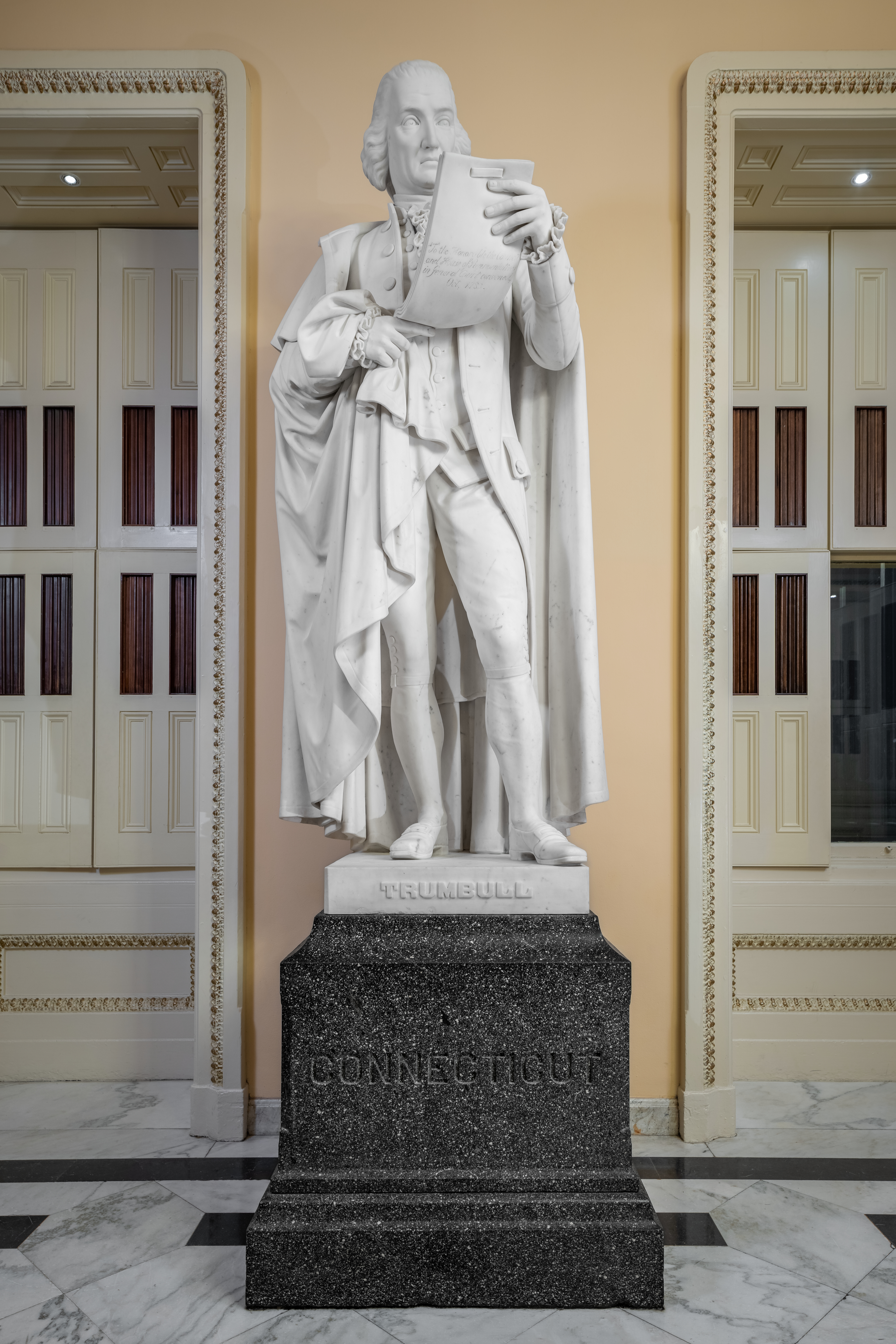
- The statue in 2023
- Artist: Chauncey Ives
- Subject: Jonathan Trumbull

Jonathan Trumbull is an 1872 marble sculpture of Jonathan Trumbull by Chauncey Ives, installed in the United States Capitol, in Washington, D.C., as part of the National Statuary Hall Collection. It is one of two statues donated by the state of Connecticut. The sculpture was unveiled by Senator William Alfred Buckingham of Connecticut on March 8, 1872.

The statue is one of two that Ives placed in the collection, the other being Roger Sherman, also representing Ives's native state of Connecticut. The sculptor and critic Lorado Taft, in his book The History of American Sculpture, is not kind to either Ives or his creations, writing that "Connecticut, with misplaced loyalty to an aspiring son, gave him the commission for the two figures which represent the state in the National Hall of Statuary. The result may be seen in the two marble images labelled "Trumbull" and "Sherman" which were introduced into that very promiscuous gathering in 1872. Description of these curious works would be unprofitable. They fit in nicely with the majority of their companions, but of all the dead men there they seem the most conscious of being dead." The artist historian E. Wayne Craven, in the next survey of American sculpture, Sculpture in America, adds that both statues were "represented in colonial attire, and were accordingly turned into costume pieces by the sculptor, who was better at rendering ruffles and buttons than at modeling the male figure."

== See also ==
- 1872 in art
