= Undine =

European folklore beings associated with water

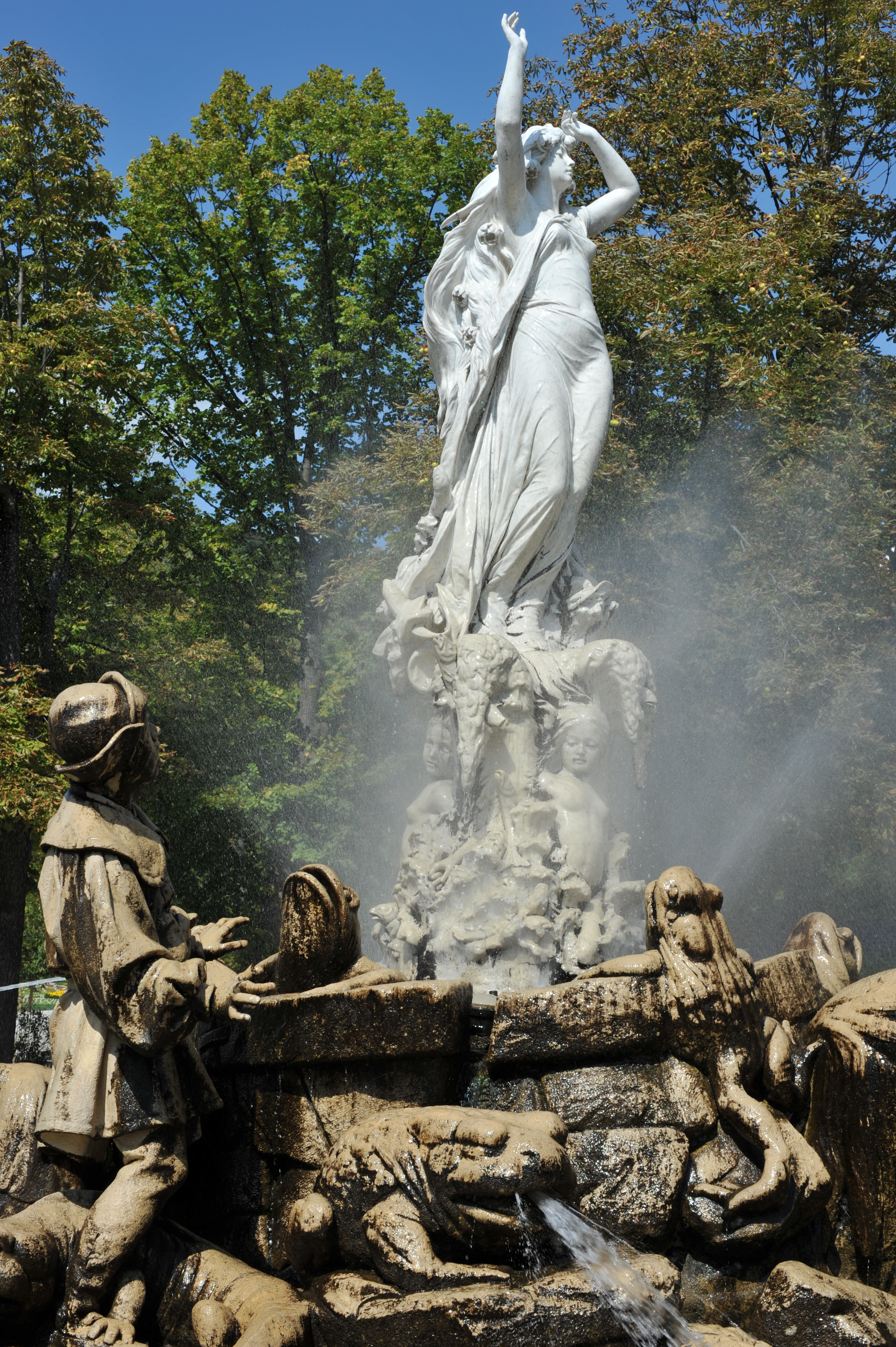
- Undine

Creature information
- Grouping: Legendary creature

Origin
- First attested: In folklore
- Region: Europe

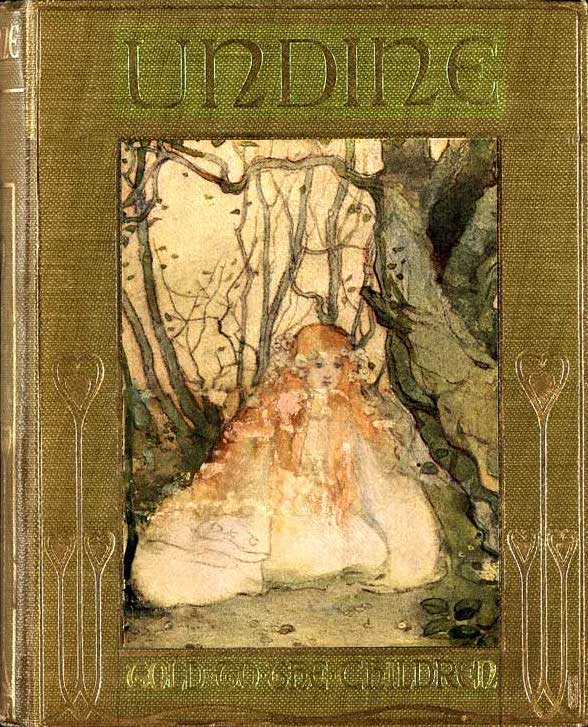
Undine A novella

Undines (/ˈʌndiːnz, ənˈdiːnz/; also ondines) are a category of elemental beings associated with water, stemming from the alchemical writings of Paracelsus. Later writers developed the undine into a water nymph in its own right, and it continues to live in modern literature and art through such adaptations as Friedrich de la Motte Fouqué's Undine (1811) and Hans Christian Andersen's "The Little Mermaid" (1837).

== Etymology ==
The term Undine first appears in the alchemical writings of Paracelsus, a Renaissance alchemist and physician. It derives from the Latin word unda, meaning "wave", with a diminutive "-ina" which in modern Italian could translate the term "little wave" (or alternatively from Lithuanian language word Vandene (water=vanduo)), and first appears in Paracelsus' A Book on Nymphs, Sylphs, Pygmies, and Salamanders, and on the Other Spirits, published posthumously in 1566. Ondine is an alternative spelling, and has become a female given name.

== Elementals ==
Paracelsus believed that each of the four classical elements—earth, water, air and fire—is inhabited by different categories of elemental spirits, liminal creatures that share our world: gnomes, undines, sylphs and salamanders respectively. According to Paracelsus (as paraphrased by occultist Manly P. Hall), the spiritual inhabitants of the elements are "invisible, spiritual counterparts of visible Nature ... many resembling human beings in shape, and inhabiting worlds of their own, unknown to man because his undeveloped senses were incapable of functioning beyond the limitations of the grosser elements". (Note: Cf. also Hartmann (1902) on Paracelsus.)

== Description and common attributes ==
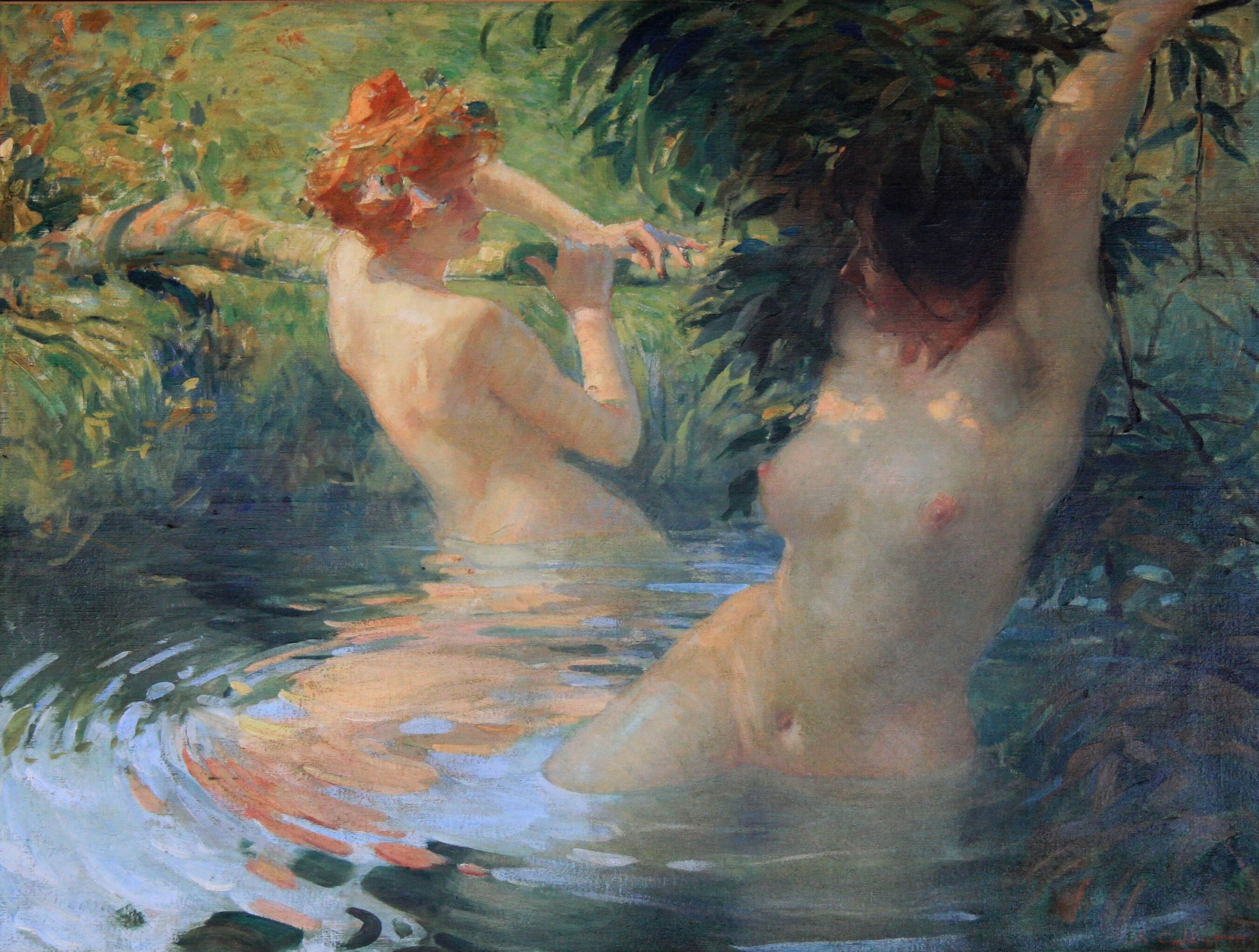
Les Ondines by Antoine Calbet, Musée des Beaux-Arts de Cambrai

Undines are almost invariably depicted as being female, which is consistent with the ancient Greek idea that water is a female element. They are usually found in forest pools and waterfalls, and their beautiful singing voices are sometimes heard over the sound of water. The group contains many species, including nereides, limnads, naiades, mermaids and potamides.

What undines lack, compared to humans, is an immortal soul. Marriage with a human shortens their lives on Earth, but earns them an immortal human soul, a view which was professed by Paracelsus.

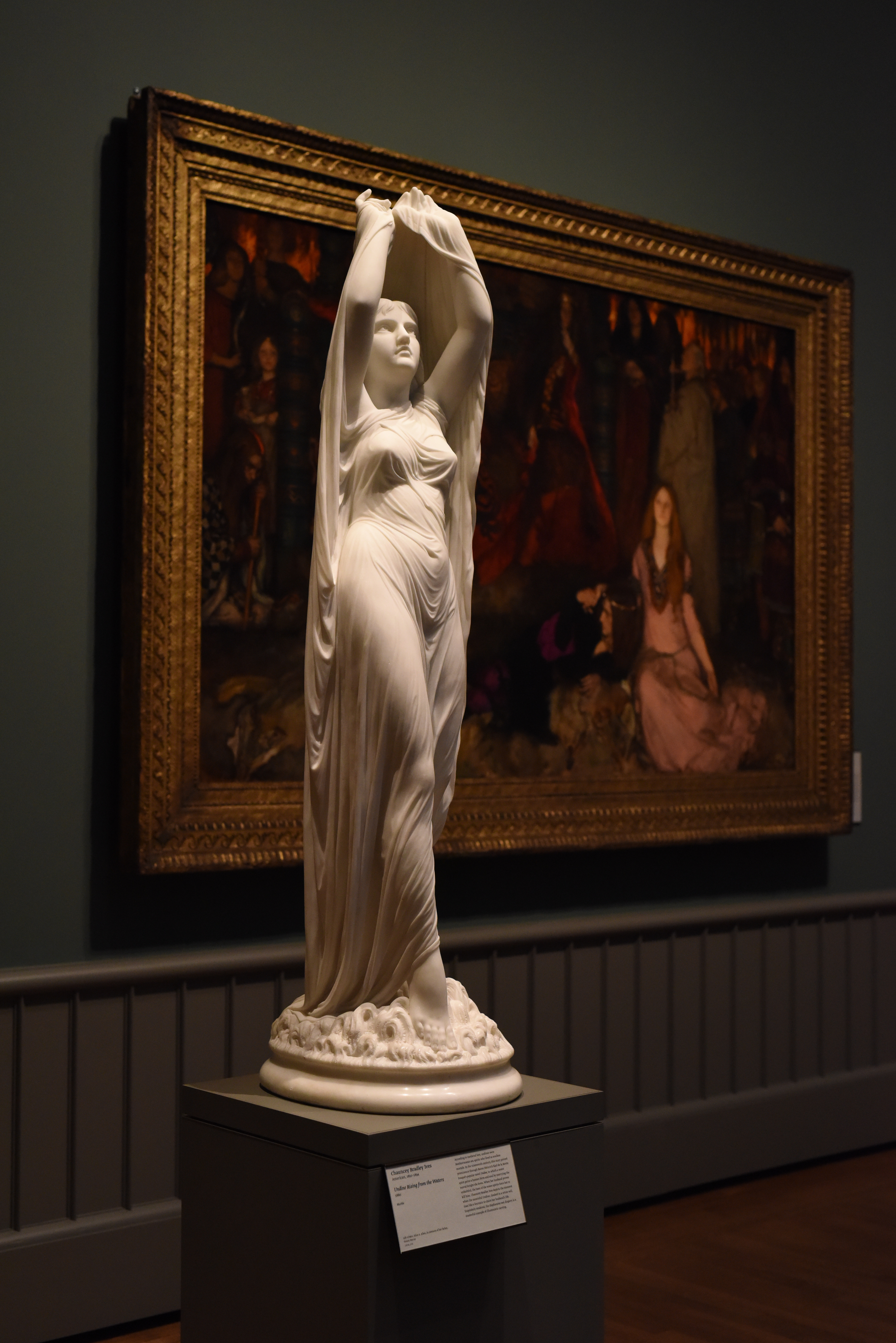
Undine Rising from the Waters by Chauncey Bradley Ives at Yale's Art Gallery

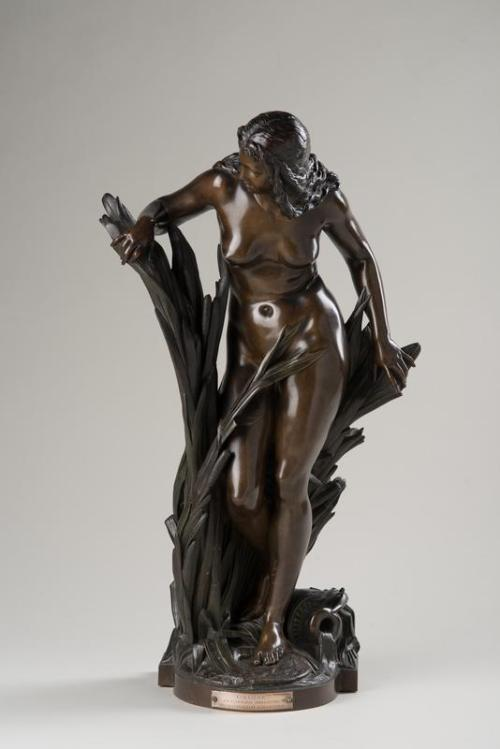
Undine by Albert-Ernest Carrier-Belleuse (ca.1875-1887), Aberdeen Art Gallery

The offspring of a union between an undine and a man are humans with a soul, but also with some kind of aquatic characteristic, called a watermark. Moses Binswanger, the protagonist in Hansjörg Schneider's Das Wasserzeichen (1997), has a cleft in his throat, for instance, which must be periodically submerged in water to prevent it from becoming painful.

== Paracelsus ==
The ancient Greek philosopher Empedocles (c. 490 – c. 430 BC) was the first to propose that the four classical elements were sufficient to explain everything present in the world.

Paracelsus's view of elemental spirits may have grown out of the folklore that a very human-like race of spirits exists in a different "plane" from humans, according to Celticist Henry Jenner.

According to Paracelsus in Liber de Nymphis, there are four types of spirit-men, which each reside in one of the four elements: earth, air/wind, fire, and water. These spirits are similar to human beings, but not endowed with immortal souls. But Undines ("water women", "water people") in particular are able to consort with humans more than the spirits of other elements, and are most capable of entering into marriage with a human male, thus earning a kernel of the immortality. The children born to her will be imparted with human souls as well. For this reason, the Undines (also called Nymphs) yearn to marry a human husband. If a man has an Undine/Nymph for a wife, he must be careful not to offend her in the presence of water, or she will return to her element.

This motif of the husband's calumny causing Undine's departure also occurs in Fouquet's novella (and Hoffmann's opera). Undine's husband Huldbrand had been forewarned not to do so, but he rekindles his unfaithful relationship with Bertalda, he commits the insult, and she splashes away beneath the Danube.

Paracelsus also emphasizes that even if the sylph/undine has returned to water, the marriage still remains valid, and she cannot be presumed to be dead, another theme exploited by Fouquet's novella: thus, as her husband's transgression necessitates her departure into the watery world, she makes the insistence on her husband that his vow of fidelity still remains in place, and breaking it would have deadly consequence. And she continues to remind to her husband to remain faithful, in the form of a message in a dream between the swan song.

According to Paracelsus, the Undine will still receive her place on the Day of Judgment, i.e., she will still preserve the immortal soul she earned through marriage.

David Gallagher argues that, although they had Paracelsus as a source, 19th and 20th-century German authors found inspiration for their many versions of undine in classical literature, particularly Ovid's Metamorphoses, especially given the transformation of many of their undines into springs: Hyrie (book VII) and Egeria (book XV) are two such characters.

== Cultural references ==
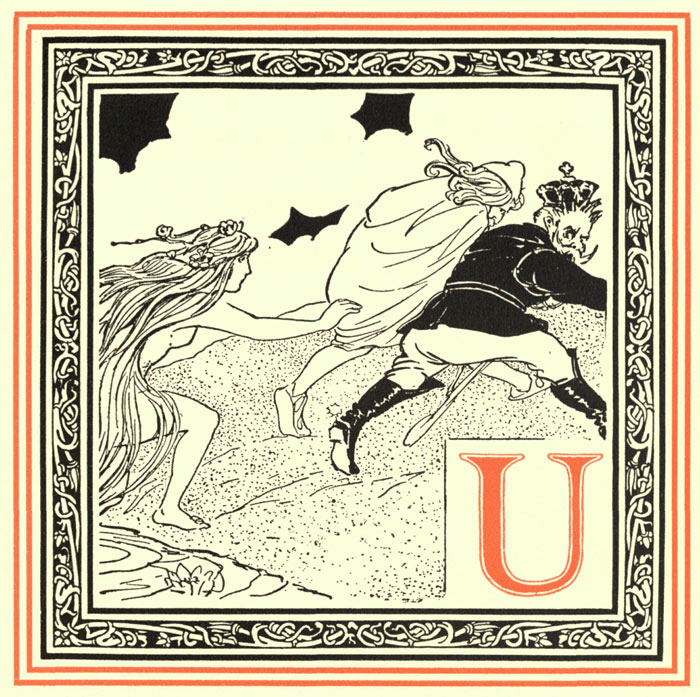
An undine depicted "pursuing Ulysses And Umberto" in a 2007 "alphabet of celebrities"

Later writers embellished Paracelsus' undine classification by developing it into a water nymph in its own right. The romance Undine by Friedrich de la Motte Fouqué, published in 1811, is based on a passage in Paracelsus' Book on Nymphs in which he relates how an undine can acquire an immortal soul by marrying a human, although it likely also borrows from the 17th-century Rosicrucian novel Comte de Gabalis.

Ondine was the title of one of the poems in Aloysius Bertrand's collection Gaspard de la Nuit of 1842. This poem inspired the first movement of Maurice Ravel's 1908 piano suite Gaspard de la nuit.

The character of Mélisande from Maurice Maeterlinck's symbolist play Pelléas et Mélisande has been seen as an Undine figure. Debussy, Sibelius, Fauré, and Schoenberg all wrote music adaptions of the play. The 1939 play Ondine by French dramatist Jean Giraudoux is also based upon Fouqué's novella, as is Ondine, a ballet by composer Hans Werner Henze and choreographer Frederick Ashton with Margot Fonteyn as Undine. Austrian author Ingeborg Bachmann, a friend of Henze's who collaborated with him frequently, attended the premiere of the ballet in London, and published her short story "Undine geht" in the collection Das dreißigste Jahr (1961), in which Undine "is neither a human nor a water spirit, but an idea".

Fouqué's Undine also exerted an influence on Hans Christian Andersen's "The Little Mermaid" (1837), and H.D. plays on this identification in her autobiographical novel HERmione (1927). Burton Pollin notes the popularity of the tale in the English-speaking world: translations in English appeared in 1818 and 1830, and a "superior version" was published by American churchman Thomas Tracy in 1839 and reprinted in 1824, 1840, 1844, and 1845; he estimates that by 1966 almost a hundred English versions had been printed, including adaptations for children. Edgar Allan Poe was profoundly influenced by Fouqué's tale, according to Pollin, which may have come about through Poe's broad reading of Walter Scott and Samuel Taylor Coleridge: Scott had derived the character of the White Lady of Avenel (The Monastery, 1820) from Undine, and a passage by Coleridge on Undine was reprinted in Tracy's 1839 edition.

French composer Claude Debussy included a piece called "Ondine" in his collection of piano preludes written in 1913 (Preludes, Book 2, No. 8).

A poem by Seamus Heaney titled "Undine" appears in his 1969 collection Door into the Dark. The poem is narrated from the first-person perspective of the water nymph itself.

Japanese pianist Yukie Nishimura composed a piece of piano music titled Undine in late 1980s.

The composer Carl Reinecke wrote the "Sonata Undine" for flute and piano, opus 167, first published in 1882.

=== In popular culture ===
In the 1993 Super Nintendo role-playing game, Secret of Mana, the protagonists rescue a water spirit named Undine. Thereafter, players are able to cast water magic by summoning Undine.

In 2015, a fish-based character by the name of Undyne appeared in the video game Undertale.

In 2017, Ryan Jude Novelline created a gown that he displayed at New York Comic Con based on the story of Undine.

Undines exist as a species of water elemental in the world of the Japanese manga Monster Musume, and are later revealed to be related to one of the main characters.

== Ondine's curse ==
Congenital central hypoventilation syndrome, a rare medical condition in which those affected lack autonomic control of their breathing and are hence at risk of suffocation while sleeping, is also known as Ondine's curse. Ondine, the eponymous heroine of Giraudoux's play, tells her future husband Hans, whom she has just met, that "I shall be the shoes of your feet ... I shall be the breath of your lungs". Ondine makes a pact with her uncle, the King of the Ondines, that if Hans ever deceives her he will die. After their honeymoon Hans is reunited with his first love, the Princess Bertha, and Ondine leaves him, only to be captured by a fisherman six months later. On meeting Ondine again on the day of his wedding to Bertha, Hans tells her that "all the things my body once did by itself, it does now only by special order ... A single moment of inattention and I forget to breathe". Hans and Ondine kiss, and he dies.

Critics have pointed out that medical texts on the syndrome frequently misinterpret Ondine as a vengeful or malevolent character; in the play, Ondine is not responsible for the curse and tries to save Hans.

== See also ==
- Ekendriya
- Gwragedd Annwn
- Mami Wata
- Melusine
- Mermaid
- Morgen
- Nāga
- Neck
- Rusalka
- Selkie
- Siren
