= Jain terms and concepts =

== Main Points in Jainism ==
- Every living being has a soul.
- Every soul is potentially divine and has the innate qualities of infinite knowledge, infinite perception, infinite power, and infinite bliss. Have benevolence for all living beings..
- Therefore, regard every living being as yourself and harm no one.
- Every soul is born as a celestial, human, sub-human or hellish being according to its own karmas.
- Every soul is the architect of its own life, here or hereafter.
- When a soul becomes freed from karmas, it gets God-consciousness (infinite knowledge, infinite perception, infinite power, and infinite bliss) and becomes liberated.
- Right view, Right knowledge and Right Conduct (triple gems of Jainism) provide the way to this realisation.
- Non-violence (Ahimsa) is the basis of right faith, the condition of right knowledge and the kernel of right conduct.
- Control your senses.
- Limit your possessions and lead a pure life of usefulness to yourself and others. Ownership of an object by itself is not possessiveness; however attachment to an object is possessiveness
- Enjoy the company of the holy and better qualified, be merciful to those who are afflicted and be tolerant towards those who are perversely inclined.
- Four things are difficult to attain by a soul: human birth, knowledge of the law, faith in it and the pursuit of the right path.
- It is important not to waste human life in evil ways. Instead, we should strive to rise up on the ladder of spiritual evolution.

== Fundamental Principles (Tattvas) ==
Jain philosophy can be described in various ways, but the most acceptable tradition is to describe it in terms of the Tattvas or fundamentals. Without knowing them one cannot progress towards liberation. They are:

1. Jīva - Souls and living things
2. Ajiva - Non-living things
3. Asrava - Influx of karma
4. Bandha - The bondage of karma
5. Samvara - The stoppage of influx of karma
6. Nirjara - Shedding of karma
7. Moksha - Liberation or Salvation

Each one of these fundamental principles are discussed and explained by Jain Scholars in depth. There are two examples that can be used to explain the above principle intuitively.

(1) A man rides a wooden boat to reach the other side of the river. Now the man is Jiva, the boat is ajiva. Now the boat has a leak and water flows in. That incoming of water is Asrava and accumulating there is Bandh, Now the man tries to save the boat by blocking the hole. That blockage is Samvara and throwing the water outside is Nirjara. Now the man crosses the river and reaches his destination, Moksha.

== Nine substances ==
Nine substances are explained as: Consider a family living in a house. One day, they were enjoying a fresh cool breeze coming through their open doors and windows of the house. However, the weather suddenly changed to a terrible dust storm. The family, realizing the storm, closed the doors and windows. But, by the time they could close all the doors and windows some of the dust had been blown into the house. After closing the doors and the windows, they started clearing the dust that had come in to make the house clean again.

This simple scenario can be interpreted as follows:

1. Jivas are represented by the living people.
2. Ajiva is represented by the house.
3. Punya is represented by enjoyment resulting from the cool breeze.
4. Pap is represented by the discomfort resulting from the storm.
5. Asrava is represented by the influx of dust.
6. Bandh is represented by the accumulation of dust in the house.
7. Samvara is represented by the closing of the doors and windows to stop the accumulation of dust.
8. Nirjara is represented by the cleaning up of already collected dust from the house.
9. Moksha is represented by the cleaned house, which is similar to the shedding off all karmic particles from the soul.

== Jīvas (souls) ==
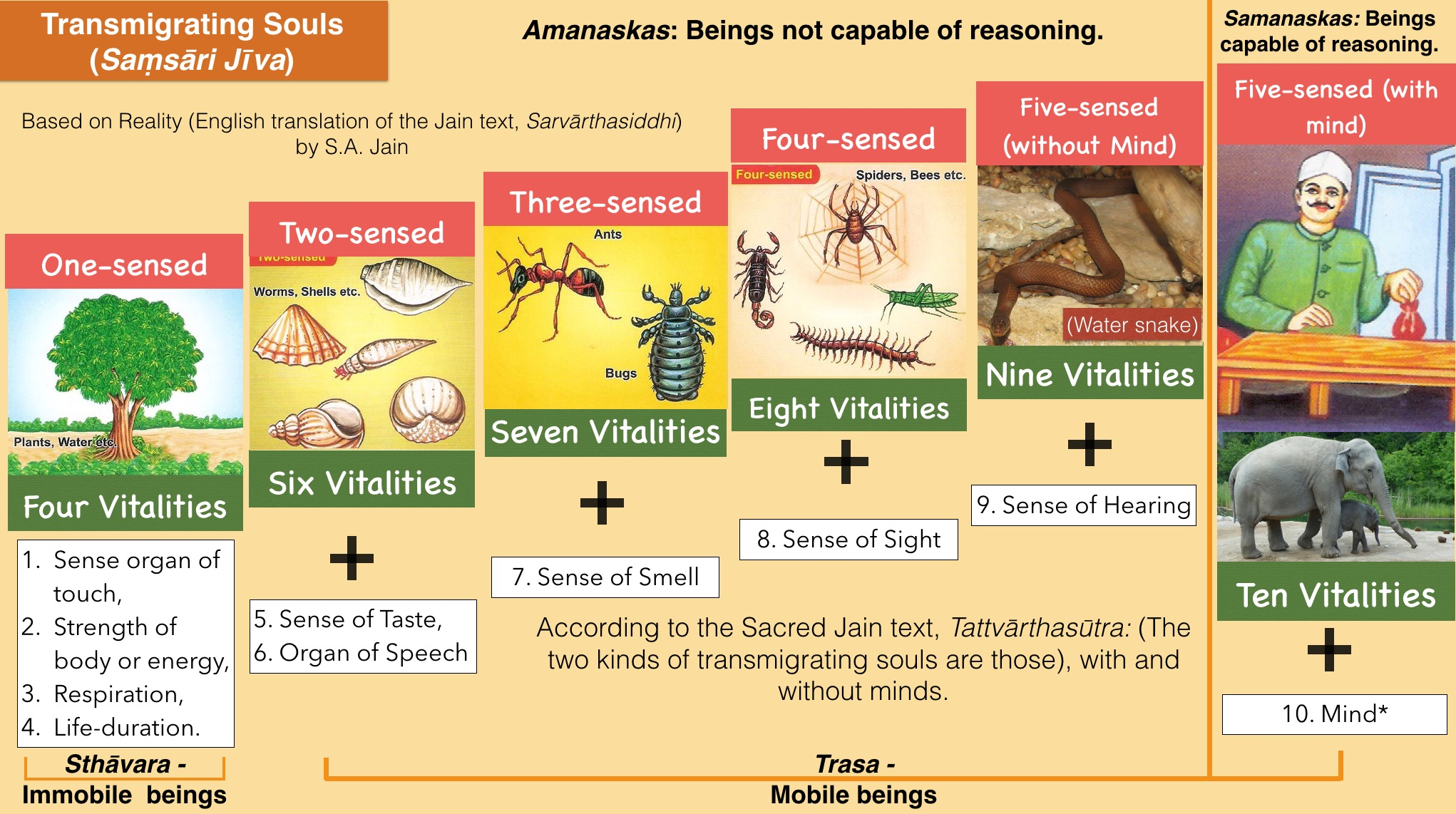
Classification of Saṃsāri Jīvas (Transmigrating Souls) in Jainism.According to Sacred Jain text, Sarvārthasiddhi: "Immobile beings (sthāvara jīvās) possess the four vitalities of the sense-organ of touch, strength of body or energy, respiration and life-duration.

There are five classes of beings:

One-sensed beings (Ekendriya Jiva) have:

- Sense of touch

Two-sensed beings (Beindriya Jiva) have:

- Sense of touch
- Sense of taste

Three-sensed beings (Trindriya Jiva) have:

- Sense of touch
- Sense of taste
- Sense of smell

Four-sensed beings (Caturendriya Jiva) have:

- Sense of touch
- Sense of taste
- Sense of smell
- Sense of sight

Five-sensed beings (Pañcendriya Jiva) have:

- Sense of touch
- Sense of taste
- Sense of smell
- Sense of sight
- Sense of hearing

There are two sub-categories among the five-sensed beings: Sanjñi - With mind; Asanjñi - Without mind

== Vitalities ==
A prana (vitalities) is the inherent ability of a jiva to perform a certain act. The 10 pranas are as under:

1. Shrotrendriya Prana - Ability to hear
2. Caksurendriya Prana - Ability to see
3. Ghranendriya Prana - Ability to smell
4. Rasanendriya Prana - Ability to taste
5. Sparshanendriya Prana - Ability to touch
6. Manabala Prana - Ability to think
7. Vacanabala Prana - Ability to speak
8. Kayabala Prana - Physical ability
9. Shvasocchvasabala Prana - Ability to breathe
10. Ayushyabala Prana - Ability to live.

(It is said that any living being lives only as long as his/her Ayushyabala Prana permits him/her to.)

== Types of Kaya (Bodies) ==
- Prthvikaya Jiva - Class of beings whose body is made up of the Earth. They fall under the category of One-sensed beings.
- JalaKaya Jiva - Class of beings whose body is made up of water. They fall under the category of One-sensed beings.
- Agnikaya Jiva - Class of beings whose body is made up of fire. They fall under the category of One-sensed beings.
- Vayukaya Jiva - Class of beings whose body is made up of air. They fall under the category of One-sensed beings.
- Vanaspatikaya Jiva - Class of beings whose body is made up of vegetation. They fall under the category of One-sensed beings.
- Trasakaya Jiva - Class of beings who are mobile. They fall under the category of two-sensed, three-sensed, four-sensed, and five-sensed beings.

== Indriyas ==
The Five Indriyas, or 5 senses are:

1. Sparshana Indriya - Sense of touch
2. Rasana Indriya - Sense of taste
3. Ghrana Indriya - Sense of smelling
4. Chakshu Indriya - Sense of seeing
5. Karna or Shrotra Indriya - Sense of hearing

== Paryaptis ==
Paryaptis or sufficiencies, which are determined by the presence of karmin particles in each soul at the time the soul is taking a new birth. Paryaptis are of 6 types:

1. Ahara Paryapti - The presence of karmic particles that determine the ability of a jiva to eat
2. Sharira Paryapti - The presence of karmic particles that determine the ability of a jiva to have a body.
3. Indriya Paryapti - The presence of karmic particles that determine the ability of a jiva to have the organs of sense, namely, touch, taste, smell, hearing and vision.
4. Shvasocchvasa Paryapti - The presence of karmic particles that enable a jiva to breathe.
5. Bhasha Paryapti - The presence of karmic particles that enable a jiva to speak.
6. Mana Paryapti - The presence of karmic particles that enable a jiva to think rationally and distinguish between the heya (avoidable), jneya (knowable but not doable) and upadeya (worthy of emulation).

== Types of physique ==
Worldly souls (souls that have not attained liberation) are accompanied by 5 types of physique:

1. Audarika Sharira - The physical body, made up of skin, bones, meat, blood, etc. All the living beings who lived on Earth have this body.
2. Vaikriyaka Sharira - The body of heavenly beings and hellish beings. Not subject to the physical laws of the Earth. It is believed that this kind of physique can morph into various forms.
3. Aharaka Sharira - This is a special kind of physique and can only be formed by very special ascetics who are extremely learned in the Ancient texts (the Purvas).
4. Taijas Sharira - This kind of physique is had by each living being, since it is essential in order to absorb the food we eat, the liquids we drink and the air we breathe. It is likened to fire, since fire can consume all before it.
5. Karmana Sharira - This kind of physique is had by each living being which is not liberated, whether the being lives in hell, heaven or Earth. This physique is made of karmas.

== Yogas ==
The fifteen Yogas (sum total of activities) are made up of four Manoyogas (mental activities), four Vacanayogas (verbal activities), and seven Kayayogas (physical activities).

The four Manoyogas are:

- Satya Manoyoga - Truthful Mental Activity,
- Asatya Manoyoga - False Mental Activity,
- Mishra Manoyoga - Mental Activity that is partly true and partly false,
- Vyavahara Manoyoga - Practical Mental Activity.

The four Vacanayogas are:

- Satya Vacanayoga - Truthful Verbal Activity,
- Asatya Vacanayoga - False Verbal Activity,
- Mishra Vacanayoga - Verbal Activity that is partly true and partly false,
- Vyavahara Vacanayoga - Practical Verbal Activity.

The 7 Kayayogas are:

- Audarika Kayayoga,
- Audarika Mishra Kayayoga,
- Vaikriyaka Kayayoga,
- Vaikriyaka Mishra Kayayoga,
- Aharaka Kayayoga,
- Aharaka Mishra Kayayoga,
- Karmana Kayayoga.

== Karma theory ==
The Jain religion places great emphasis on Karma. Essentially, it means that all jivas reap what they sow. A happy or miserable existence is influenced by actions in previous births. These results may not occur in the same life, and what we sow is not limited to physical actions. Physical, verbal, and mental activities affect future situations. Karma has long been an essential component of Jainism, and other Indian religions such as Buddhism, Hinduism and Sikhism. It is believed generally that an omniscient Tirthankar can foresee all things, long before science.

== Types of Karmas ==
- Four Ghātiyā karmas
1. Ghātki karmas are those karmas that obstruct the soul's innate abilities of omniscience, omni-perception, supreme bliss and omnipotence.
2. Jñānāvaraṇīya karma - Karmas that obstruct the soul's intrinsic ability to know everything (omniscience)
3. Darśanāvaraṇīya karma - Karmas that obstruct the soul's intrinsic ability to see everything (omni-perception)
4. Mohanīya karma - Deluding karmas that obstruct the soul's intrinsic ability to be supremely blissful.
5. Antarāya karma - Obstruction-causing karmas that obstruct the soul's intrinsic supreme strength (omnipotence)
- Four Aghātiyā karmas
1. Aaghātki karmas are those karmas that cause temporal bondage.
2. Vedanīya karma - Karmas that cause feelings of happiness and unhappiness.
3. Nāma karma - Karmas that determine the type of body the soul will take birth in.
4. Āyushya karma - Karmas that determine life span of the body the soul will take birth in.
5. Gotra karma - Karmas that determine whether one is born in a high status family or a low status family.

== Components of Samyaktva ==
- Niḥśankitatva - Having no doubts as to the veracity and correctness of the Jina's teachings.
- Niḥkānkṣitatva - Having no temporal desire in the pursuit of spiritual goals.
- Nirvicikitsatva - Having no repugnance or embarrassment in serving Jain ascetics despite the fact that male Digambara Jain ascetics wear no clothes and that no Jain ascetics of any sect bathe, brush their teeth or perform other activities that involve beautifying the body.
- Amūḍhadṛṣṭitva - Absence of false understanding of the Jina's teachings.
- Upabṛṃhana - Acquiring excellence in spiritual activities and observance of religious practices.
- Shtitikaraṇa - Stabilizing the faith of fellow Jains who seem to be shaky in their faith in the teachings of the Jinas, to restore their faith in the Jinas.
- Prabhāvanā - Conducting one's life in a manner that glorifies the Jain religion.
- Vātsalya - Brotherhood and fraternity with fellow Jains.

== Bhāvanā (Mental Contemplations) ==
- Anitya - Impermanence. Everything is impermanent except the soul.
- Aśaraṇa - No lasting shelter in this constantly changing world except Moksha, or liberation.
- Saṃsāra - The temporal world is impermanent. Only Moksha is permanent.
- Ekatva - Oneness with the soul
- Anyatva - Otherness with all persons and things other than the soul
- Aśucitva - The body is full of filth. Hence, identification with and attachment for this mortal body is futile.
- Āsrava - Influx. Deluded worldly beings suffer from the constant influx of bondage-causing karmas to the soul.
- Samvara - Stoppage. The stoppage of the influx of bondage-causing karmas to the soul.
- Nirjarā - Shedding. The shedding of bondage-causing karmas from the soul.
- Dharmasvākhyāta - Dharma is self-realizable.
- Loka - The Universe in all its forms
- Bodhidurlabha - It is difficult, well nigh impossible to attain correct understanding of the soul and the true path to liberation.

== Sinful activities ==
Jains observe the vow of ahimsa and refrain from all violence. It is recommended that sinful activities should be eradicated. Some sinful activities are as under:

1. Pranatipata/Himsa: Violence
2. Mrushavada: Untruth
3. Adatadana: Theft
4. Maithuna: Unchaste behaviour
5. Parigraha: Possessiveness
6. Krodha: Anger
7. Mana: Arrogance
8. Maya: Illusion
9. Lobha: Greed
10. Raga: Attachment
11. Dvesha: Hate
12. Kalaha: Agitation
13. Abhyakhyana: Accusation
14. Paishunya: Gossip
15. Rati-Arati: Likes and dislikes
16. Para-parivada: Criticism
17. Mayavrushavada: Obsession
18. Mithyatvashalya --- Wrong belief
