= Henri de Montfaucon de Villars =

- Born: 1635 or 1638; Alet-les-Bains, France
- Died: 1673; Lyon, France
- Other name: Nicolas-Pierre-Henri de Montfaucon de Villars
- Known for: Writer, Abbot

Nicolas-Pierre-Henri de Montfaucon de Villars (1635 or 1638 –1673), the abbot of Villars, also known as Henri de Montfaucon de Villars, was a French abbot and writer in the 17th century.

The "Nicolas-Pierre" (attributed to it only since the beginning of the 20^{th} Century) are not attested by any ancient source and come from unsubstantiated assumptions.

== Biography ==
Coming from a noble family, Montfaucon de Villars was born in the diocese of Alet-les-Bains, in the upper Aude valley. Nothing specific is known about his studies and his beginnings, except that he was Father of Christian doctrine and had to teach as such in the colleges of this congregation, that is to say in the province Toulouse, or in that of Paris.

Condemned to the wheel by the Parliament of Toulouse in 1669 with three of his brothers in a family vendetta affair, he went up to Paris, certainly to escape this sentence, and frequented various somewhat libertine scholars, but evolved especially in the circle of Jansenists and friends of Port-Royal, through his cousin Jean-François de Montfaucon de La Péjan. He begins a career as a worldly abbot (he then takes the title of Abbot of Villars without being formally abbot or receiving any abbey benefit, adopting the name of a land which came to him from his father) and embarks on the literature, successively publishing a satire against the "secret sciences" (Le Comte de Gabalis, November 1670) and a Critique de Bérénice (early 1671) in which he attacks Racine and Corneille. But his spikes against the Jansenists in Le Comte de Gabalis (deliberate attacks or simple blunders) lead Antoine Arnauld to have the work banned as soon as March 1671, to ban Montfaucon de Villars from preaching and to ruin his reputation with the important families of the nobility he frequented. Montfaucon de Villars takes revenge on passing to the enemy: he defends a Jesuit, Father Bourhous, against the Jansenists in his treatise De la Délicatesse (September 1671), attacking in particular the writers of Port-Royal and the Pensées by Pascal. It was certainly Antoine Arnauld who then published in Paris the judgment of the Parliament of Toulouse in 1669 condemning Montfaucon de Villars and his brothers to death "for crimes of murder and fire", thus making public an infamous condemnation which had not been known outside the purview of the Toulouse Parliament. His career was then ruined: nothing left his pen until his death. He died assassinated on the road to Lyon in 1673 at the hands of one of his cousins, Pierre de Terroüil, caught up in the family vendetta whose gear had led him to leave Languedoc.

== Works ==
Montfaucon de Villars is especially famous for his work The Count of Gabalis, or Interviews on the Secret Sciences (1670) where he gives a tasty parody of magic, astrology, alchemy, divination and what he calls "the Holy Cabal", which is none other than the doctrine of Paracelsus on elementary spirits, so called because they populate the four elements:

"The air is full of an innumerable multitude of peoples [the sylphs] of human figure, a little proud in appearance, but docile indeed: great lovers of science, subtle, unofficial to the wise, and enemies of the fools and the ignorant their wives and their daughters are male beauties, such as one depicts the Amazons … Know that the seas and the rivers are inhabited as well as the air* the ancient Sages named this species of people waving or nymphs … The earth is filled almost to the center of gnomes, people of small stature, guardians of treasures, mines and precious stones… As for Salamanders, flaming inhabitants of the region of fire, they serve philosophers ..."(p. 169–171).

The work, witness and actor of the vogue of rationalism and libertinism, aims both to discredit the "secret sciences" and to ruin belief in the Devil, because all the actions usually attributed to the Devil (possession, oracles of the pagans, pacts with Satan, sorcerer's sabbath, etc.) are here related to the harmless action of sylphs, gnomes, nymphs or salamanders, and the book hammers down the idea that the Devil has no power in this world.

This book, written in a clear and removed style, full of irony and charm in its form of half-philosophical half-burlesque dialogues, met with real bookstore success. His call to a certain marvelous completely renewed this genre. Its influence was lastingly exercised in literature, and it is clearly one of the springs of the discredit of magic, astrology and alchemy in France at the end of the 17^{th} Century.

== Bibliography ==
=== Works ===
- The Count of Gabalis, or Interviews on the Secret Sciences, Paris, Claude Barbin, 1670. [1] [archive ]
- La Critique de Bérénice, Paris, Louis Billaine, Michel Le Petit and Étienne Michallet, 1671, 2 vol.
- De la Délicatesse, Paris, Claude Barbin, 1671.

=== Studies ===
- Max Milner, The Devil in French Literature: From Cazotte to Beaudelaire, 1772–1861, José Corti Bookstore, Paris, 1960.
- Roger Laufer, Introduction to the Count of Gabalis, or interviews on the secret sciences, Nizet, Paris, 1963.
- Dominique Descotes, The first criticism of Pensées. Text and commentary of the fifth dialogue of the Treatise on the Delicacy of Father de Villars (1671), CNRS, Paris, 1980.
- Antony McKenna, From Pascal to Voltaire. The role of Pascal's "Thoughts" in the history of ideas between 1670 and 1734, The Voltaire Foundation, Oxford, 1990.
- Jean Lesaulnier, unusual Port-Royal. Critical edition of the "Collection of various things", Klincksieck, Paris, 1992.
- Antony McKenna, "Ménage et Bouhours", in I. Leroy-Turcan and TR Wooldridge (ed.), Gilles Ménage (1613–1692), grammarian and lexicographer: the influence of his linguistic work, SIEHLDA, Lyon, 1995, p. 121–139 Household and Bouhours [archive ] .
- Philippe Sellier, "The invention of a marvelous: The Count of Gabalis (1670)", in A. Becq, Ch. Porset and A. Mothu (ed.), Amicitia scriptor. Literature, history of ideas, philosophy. Mixtures offered to Robert Mauzi, Champion, Paris, 1998, p. 53–62.
- Philippe Sellier, "A Paschal palimpsest: The Count of Gabalis (1670)", in Ph. Sellier, Port-Royal and literature, Champion, Paris, 1999, t. I, p. 185–191.
- Michel Delon, Sylphes et sylphides, Desjonquères, Paris, 1999.
- Noémie Courtès, The Writing of Enchantment. Magic and magicians in 17th century French literature, Champion, Paris, 2004.
- The Count of Gabalis, or Interviews on the Secret Sciences (1670), ed. by Didier Kahn, Paris, Honoré Champion, 2010.
- Jean-François Perrin, "Henri de Montfaucon de Villars", Féeries, n ° 10, 2013, p. 273–278.

== See also ==
- French literature
- France in the Middle Ages
- Early modern France
- 17th-century French literature
