= Elemental =

Mythic entity personifying one of the classical elements

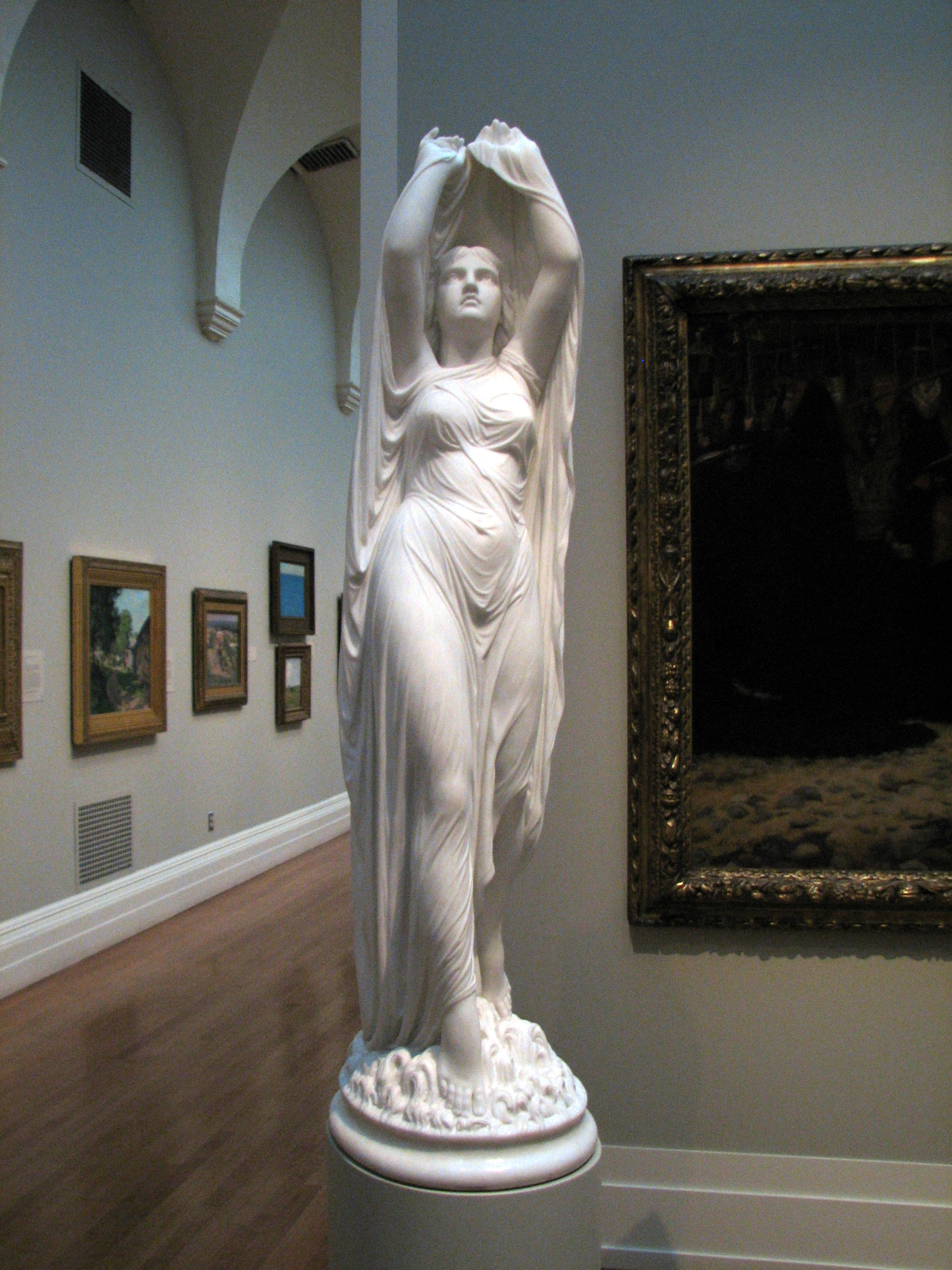
Undine Rising From the Waters, by Chauncey Bradley Ives

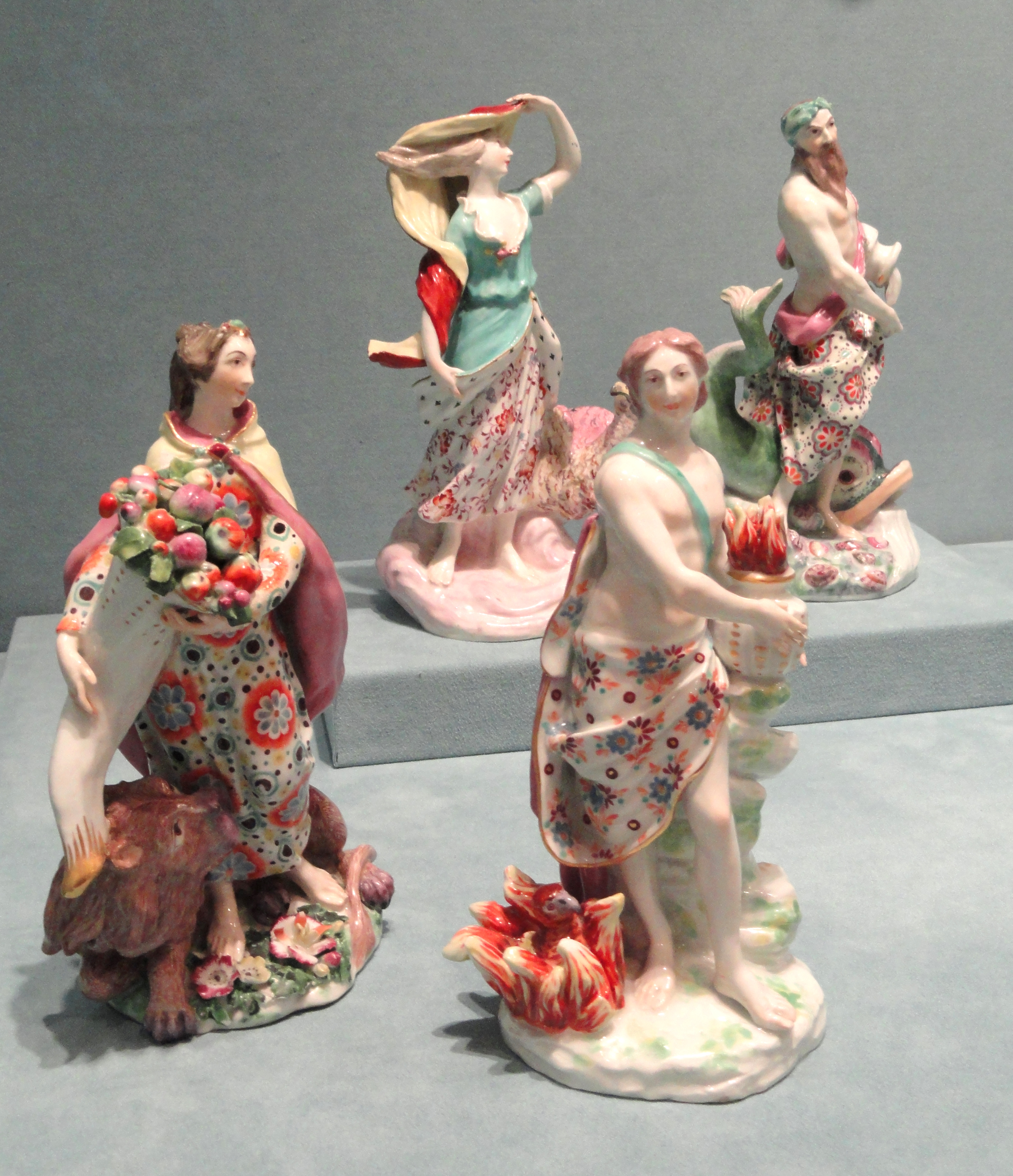
Rococo set of personification figurines of the Four Elements, 1760s, Chelsea porcelain

An elemental is a mythic supernatural being that is described in occult and alchemical works from around the time of the European Renaissance, and particularly elaborated in the 16th century works of Paracelsus. According to Paracelsus and his subsequent followers, there are four categories of elementals, which are gnomes, undines, sylphs, and salamanders. These correspond to the four Empedoclean elements of antiquity: earth, water, air, and fire, respectively. Terms employed for beings associated with alchemical elements vary by source and gloss.

== History ==
The Paracelsian concept of elementals draws from several much older traditions in mythology and religion. Common threads can be found in folklore, animism, and anthropomorphism. Examples of creatures such as the Pygmy were taken from Greek mythology.

The elements of earth, water, air, and fire, were classed as the fundamental building blocks of nature. This system prevailed in the Classical world and was highly influential in medieval natural philosophy. Although Paracelsus uses these foundations and the popular preexisting names of elemental creatures, he is doing so to present new ideas which expand on his own philosophical system. The homunculus is another example of a Paracelsian idea with roots in earlier alchemical, scientific, and folklore traditions.

=== Paracelsus ===
In his 16th-century work A Book on Nymphs, Sylphs, Pygmies, and Salamanders, and on the Other Spirits, Paracelsus identified mythological beings as belonging to one of the four elements. Part of the Philosophia Magna, this book was first printed in 1566 after Paracelsus' death. He wrote the book to "describe the creatures that are outside the cognizance of the light of nature, how they are to be understood, what marvellous works God has created". He states that there is more bliss in describing these "divine objects" than in describing fencing, court etiquette, cavalry, and other worldly pursuits. The following is his archetypal being for each of the four elements:

- Gnome, being of earth
- Undine, being of water
- Sylph, being of air
- Salamander, being of fire

The concept of elementals seems to have been conceived by Paracelsus in the 16th century, though he did not in fact use the term "elemental" or a German equivalent. He regarded them not so much as spirits but as beings between creatures and spirits, generally being invisible to mankind but having physical and commonly humanoid bodies, as well as eating, sleeping, and wearing clothes like humans. Paracelsus gave common names for the elemental types, as well as correct names, which he seems to have considered somewhat more proper, "recht namen". He also referred to them by purely German terms which are roughly equivalent to "water people," "mountain people," and so on, using all the different forms interchangeably. His fundamental classification scheme on the first page of Tractatus II of the Book on Nymphs is based on where the elementals live, and he gives the following names:

Correct name (translated)	Alternate name (Latin)	Element in which it lives
Nymph	Undina (undine)	Water
Sylph	Sylvestris (wild man)	Air
Pygmy	Gnomus (gnome)	Earth
Salamander	Vulcanus	Fire

Of the names he used, gnomus, undina, and sylph are all thought to have appeared first in Paracelsus' works, though undina is a fairly obvious Latin derivative from the word unda meaning "wave."

In De Meteoris he referred to the elementals collectively as Sagani.

He noted that undines are similar to humans in size, while sylphs are rougher, coarser, longer, and stronger. Gnomes are short, while salamanders are long, narrow, and lean. The elementals are said to be able to move through their own elements as human beings move through air. Gnomes, for example, can move through rocks, walls, and soil. Sylphs are the closest to humans in his conception because they move through air as we do, while in fire they burn, in water they drown, and in earth, they get stuck. Paracelsus states that each one stays healthy in its particular "chaos," as he terms it, but dies in the others.

Paracelsus conceived human beings to be composed of three parts, an elemental body, a sidereal spirit, and an immortal divine soul. Elementals lacked this last part, the immortal soul. However, by marriage with a human being, the elemental and its offspring could gain a soul.

=== Other authors and beliefs ===
In his influential De Occulta Philosophia, published in 1531–33, several decades before the publication of Paracelsus' Philosophia Magna, Heinrich Cornelius Agrippa also wrote of four classes of spirits corresponding to the four elements. However, he did not give special names for the classes: "In like manner they distribute these into more orders, so as some are fiery, some watery, some aerial, some terrestrial." Agrippa did however give an extensive list of various mythological beings of this type, although without clarifying which belongs to which elemental class. Like Paracelsus, he did not use the term "elemental spirit" per se.

A 1670 French satire of occult philosophy, Comte de Gabalis, was prominent in popularizing Paracelsus' theory of elementals. It particularly focused on the idea of elemental marriage discussed by Paracelsus. In the book, the titular "Count of Kabbalah" explains that members of his order (to which Paracelsus is said to belong) refrain from marriage to human beings in order to retain their freedom to bestow souls upon elementals. Comte de Gabalis used the terms sylphide and gnomide to refer to female sylphs and gnomes (often "sylphid" and "gnomid" in English translations). Male nymphs (the term used instead of the Paracelsian "undine") are said to be rare, while female salamanders are rarely seen.

The Rosicrucians claimed to be able to see such elemental spirits. To be admitted to their society, it was previously necessary for the eyes to be purged with the Panacea or "Universal Medicine," a legendary alchemical substance with miraculous curative powers. As well, glass globes would be prepared with one of the four elements and for one month exposed to beams of sunlight. With these steps the initiated would see innumerable beings immediately. These beings, known as elementals, were said to be longer lived than man but ceased to exist upon death. However, if the elemental were to wed a mortal, they would become immortal. This exception seemed to work in reverse when it came to immortals, though, for if an elemental were to wed an immortal being, the immortal would gain the mortality of the elemental. One of the conditions of joining the Rosicrucians however, was a vow of chastity in hopes of marrying an elemental.

==== Comparison with Buddhism ====
The Four Heavenly Kings rule over the eastern, southern, western and northern cardinal directions which are inhabited by gandharvas, kumbhandas, nāgas, and yakshas, respectively. These spiritual beings are reminiscent of the elementals found in the Paracelsian tradition. Different Buddhist traditions in Asia, including those of Tibet and China associate the cardinal directions with elements as well.

==== Comparison with Jainism ====
In Jainism, there is a superficially similar concept within its general cosmology, the ekendriya jiva, "one-sensed beings" with bodies (kaya) that are composed of a single element, albeit with a 5-element system (earth, water, air, fire, and plant), but these beings are actual physical objects and phenomena such as rocks, rain, fires and so on which are endowed with souls (jiva). In the Paracelsian concept, elementals are conceived more as supernatural humanoid beings which are much like human beings except for lacking souls. This is quite the opposite from the Jain conception which rather than positing soulless elementals is positing that physical objects have some type of soul and that what are commonly considered inanimate objects have this particular type of soul.

=== Twentieth century ===
In contemporary times there are those who study and practice rituals to invoke elementals. These include Wiccans, and followers of nature-based religions.

== Art and entertainment ==
Elementals became popular characters in Romantic literature after Paracelsus. Even by the 17th century, elemental spirits after the Paracelsian concept appeared in works by John Dryden and in the Comte de Gabalis. Alexander Pope cited Comte de Gabalis as his source for elemental lore in his 1712 poem The Rape of the Lock.

The Sprites of fiery Termagants in Flame
Mount up, and take a Salamander's name.
Soft yielding minds to Water glide away,
And sip, with Nymphs, their elemental Tea.
The graver Prude sinks downward to a Gnome,
In search of mischief still on Earth to roam.
The light Coquettes in Sylphs aloft repair,
And sport and flutter in the fields of Air.

— Alexander Pope, the Rape of the Lock, Canto 1

Fouqué's wildly popular 1811 novella Undine is one of the most influential literary examples. Another example is the DC Comics superhero team The Elementals, composed of the characters Gnome, Sylph, Salamander, and Undine.

Blackwood introduces an elemental in the novella The Nemesis of Fire. Elementals related to the four classical elements appeared in the fiction of Michael Moorcock, notably his 1972 novel Elric of Melniboné, and a variant appeared in the 1970s Dungeons & Dragons role-playing game. The concept has since been expanded on in numerous other fantasy, computer and trading card games.

== See also ==
- Aether/Quintessence
- Classical elements
- Kami
- Sigil
- Tattva
- Jainism

== Sources ==
- "Undine". Encyclopædia Britannica Online. Encyclopædia Britannica. 2006.
- Theophrast von Hohenheim a.k.a. Paracelsus (1933). "Liber de nymphis, sylphis, pygmaeis, et salamandris et de caeteris spiritibus". In Sudhoff, Karl; Matthießen, Wilhm. (eds.). Sämtliche Werke. Munich: Oldenbourg. abt. 1, v. 14, sec. 7.

== See also ==
- Deva (Theosophy)
