= Charles-Gaston Levadé =

Former French composer

Charles-Gaston Levadé (3 January 1869 – 27 October 1948) was a French composer.

A pupil of Jules Massenet, Grand Prix de Rome in 1863, Levadé wrote chamber music, melodies, religious music, drama and opéras comiques. He was very successful in his time.

== Life ==
Levadé was born in the 9th arrondissement of Paris. At the age of 13 he entered the Conservatoire de Paris where he followed the solfège classes of Albert Lavignac, Charles de Bériot, Georges Mathias, and Auguste Bazille. A few years later, at Lavignac's that he met Erik Satie who dedicated one of his Ogives and one of his Gymnopédies to him.

He was a student of Jules Massenet, of whom he wrote in 1911, in the Annales politiques et littéraires, 17 December 1911:

One of Massenet's great talents was to make people understand, love, deepen, by singing himself and by performing the works of the masters at the piano. He often played Schubert and Schumann to us, comparing their different geniuses even in the smallest nuances

After Massenet's resignation in 1896, Levadé attended the classes of Charles Lenepveu and obtained the Grand Prix de Rome in 1899 with his cantata Callirhoe to a text by Eugène Adénis.

In 1895 he produced a Japanese pantomime: Coeur de magots, a "sketch" given at the "Grand Guignol" in 1897, and a "salon opera" in 1903. He wrote a three-act opera: The Heretics, a lyrical tragedy on a poem by Ferdinand Hérold. In 1908, he composed the music for La Courtisane de Corinthe, to a text by Michel Carré and Paul Bilhaud which was staged in 1908 by Sarah Bernhardt, then Les Fiançailles de l'ami Fritz, after Erckmann-Chatrian in 1919.

Other musical adaptations of literary texts include Le Capitaine Fracasse, libretto by Émile Bergerat and Michel Carré, lyrical comedy from Théophile Gautier's eponymous novel and in 1929, La Peau de chagrin, lyrical comedy in four acts after Balzac, libretto by Pierre Decourcelle and Michel Carré, then La Rôtisserie de la reine Pédauque, lyrical comedy in four acts based on the novel by Anatole France in 1934.

Levadé was also a composer of popular songs (J'ai cueilli le lys, 1912), symphonic music (Prélude religieux for string orchestra), lullaby for piano and violin and religious music: Prélude religieux for organ, Agnus Dei for choir, Psaume CXIII for solo, choir and orchestra.

Levadé died in Cabourg on 27 October 1948.

== Selected works ==
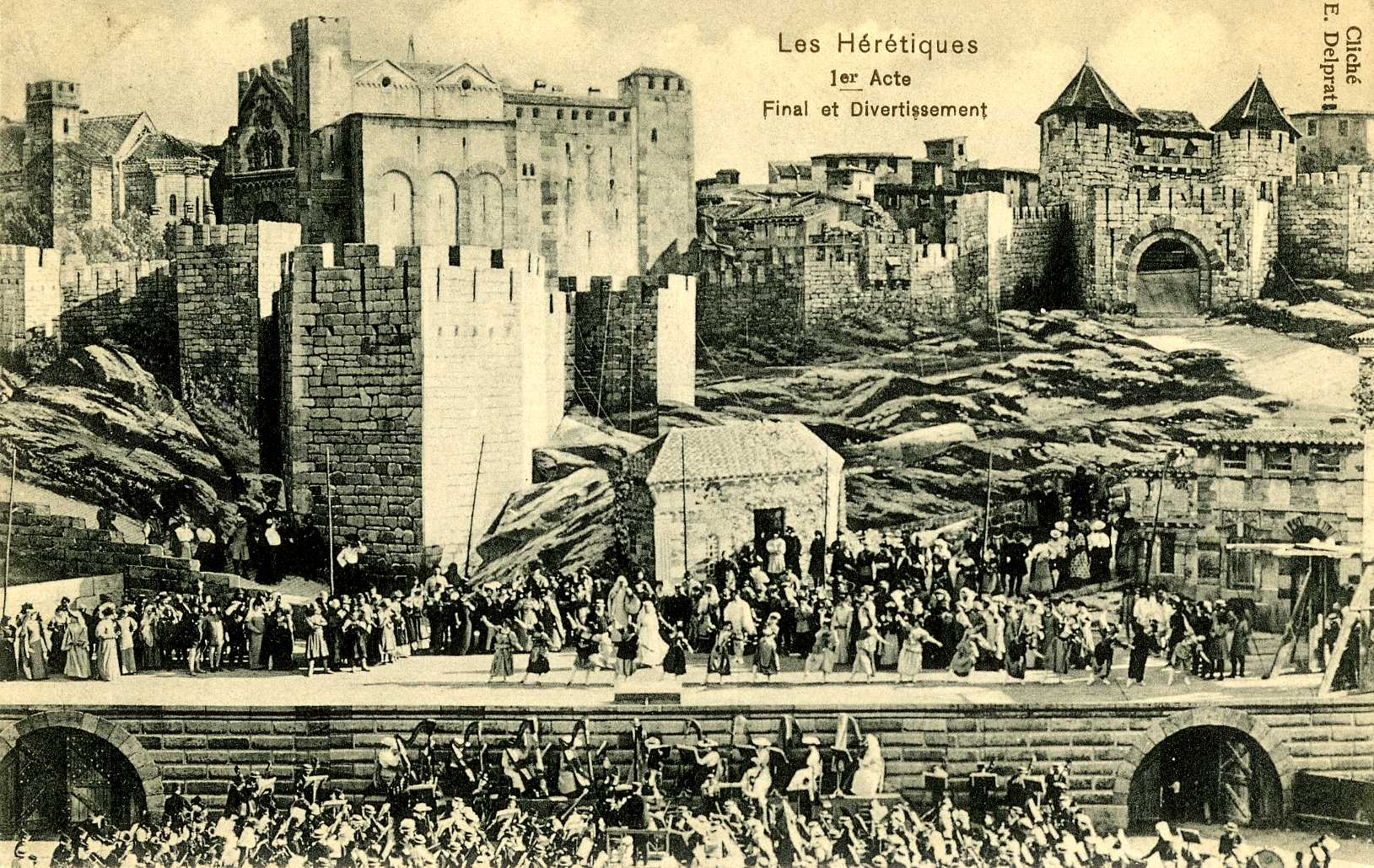
Les Hérétiques, Théâtre des Arènes à Béziers

- Antigone, cantata, 1893
- Clarisse Harlowe, cantata, 1895
- Cœur de Magots, Japanese pantomime, 1895
- Mélusine, cantata, 1896
- Hortense, couche-toi ! by Georges Courteline, Théâtre du Grand-Guignol, 1897
- Callirhoé, cantata, 1899
- L’amour d’Héliodora, Salon Opera, 1903
- Les Hérétiques, poem by Ferdinand Hérold, Théâtre des Arènes à Béziers, libretto by Ferdinand Hérold. 1905
- Stage music for La Courtisane de Corinthe by Michel Carré and Paul Bilhaud, 1908
- Les Fiançailles de l'ami Fritz by Jean-Marc d’Anthoine, 1919
- La Rôtisserie de la reine Pédauque, adapted by Georges Docquois, 1920
- Caroles de Noël, opera, 1923
- Sophie, opéra comique after Louis Tiercelin, Georges Docquois and Alfred Aubert, 1923
- La Peau de chagrin, lyrical comedy based on Honoré de Balzac's La Peau de chagrin by Pierre Decourcelle and Michel Carré, 1929
- Le Capitaine Fracasse, comedy by Émile Bergerat and Michel Carré based on the novel of the same name by Théophile Gautier
- Prélude religieux for string orchestre
- Danses alsaciennes for Grand Orchestra
- Feuilles d’album for Grand Orchestra
- Arrichino for piano
- Berceuse for piano and violin
- Prélude religieux for pipe organ
- Agnus Dei for Choir
- Psaume CXIII for Soli, Choir and Orchestra
