= Sylph =

Mythological spirit of the air

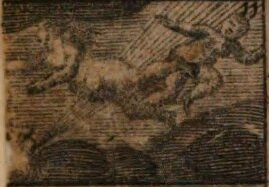
11. Air-people, wind-men, sylphs; ―engraving by Thomas Cross, Sr. (fl. 1632-1682), frontispiece to Praetorius (1668) [1666] Anthropodemus Plutonicus.

A sylph (also called sylphid) is an air spirit stemming from the 16th-century works of Paracelsus, who describes sylphs as (invisible) beings of the air, his elementals of air. A significant number of subsequent literary and occult works have been inspired by Paracelsus's concept: Robert Alfred Vaughan noted that "the wild but poetical fantasies" of Paracelsus had probably exercised a larger influence over his age and the subsequent one than is generally supposed, particularly on the Rosicrucians, but that through the 18th century they had become reduced to "machinery for the playwright" and "opera figurantes with wings of gauze and spangles".

== Etymology ==
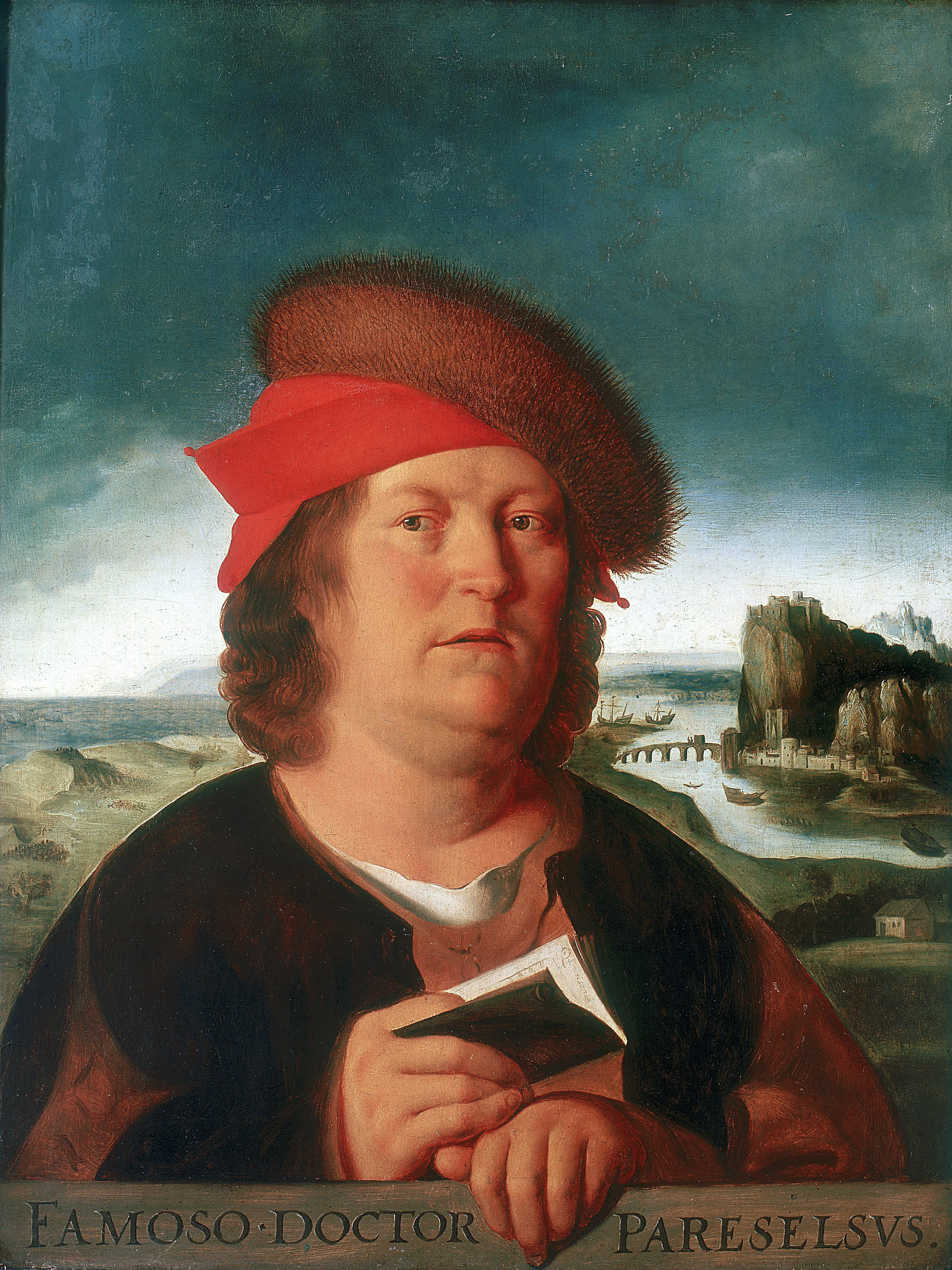
The Swiss alchemist and philosopher Theophrastus von Hohenheim ("Paracelsus") first created the concept of the sylph.

"Sylph" is possibly a blend of from Latin sylvestris and nympha, sylvestris being a common synonym for sylph in Paracelsus. Anthony Trollope notes a similar usage in the Aeneid, where silvestris is taken as an elliptical form of nympha silvestris ("forest nymph"). Jacob Grimm uses this phrase as a gloss for the Anglo-Saxon wudu-mær (roughly equivalent to "woodmare"), which he also takes as a metaphorical name for an echo. Jan Baptist van Helmont, a near contemporary of Paracelsus and coiner of the word "gas", uses sylvestris in the sense of "wild" to describe gaseous emissions, which may be connected to the Paracelsian usage. Thorpe's Northern Mythology connects the adjective sylvestres and the related silvaticas to European wild man legends. A related idea is that "sylph" is from a hyper-urbane respelling of a Latin neologism silves, but in either case this connection to the Latin root silva ("forest") is supported by Paracelsus' use of sylphes as a synonym for schrötlein, a German word for a tree spirit or especially an earth spirit in his Liber de Sanguine ultra Mortem.

An alternative theory is that it derives from sílphē (Ancient Greek: σίλφη, romanized: sílphē), which a number of etymological sources gloss as "moth". French etymological sources often derive it from a Latin word sylphus, glossed as "genius" (in the Latin sense, a type of spirit) and only known from an inscription rather than literary Latin. The Deutsches Wörterbuch however indicates that this idea arises from a 19th-century misreading of the inscription in question. Similarly, the σίλφη etymology can be dismissed from the lack of an objective historical and thus semantic connection. The idea of an intentional portmanteau is also considered doubtful, though extensive evidence can be found that indicates that Paracelsus considered the various sylvan spirits and wild men of legend to be examples of sylphs, which he occasionally took to be earth elementals rather than air elementals.

== Paracelsus' conception ==
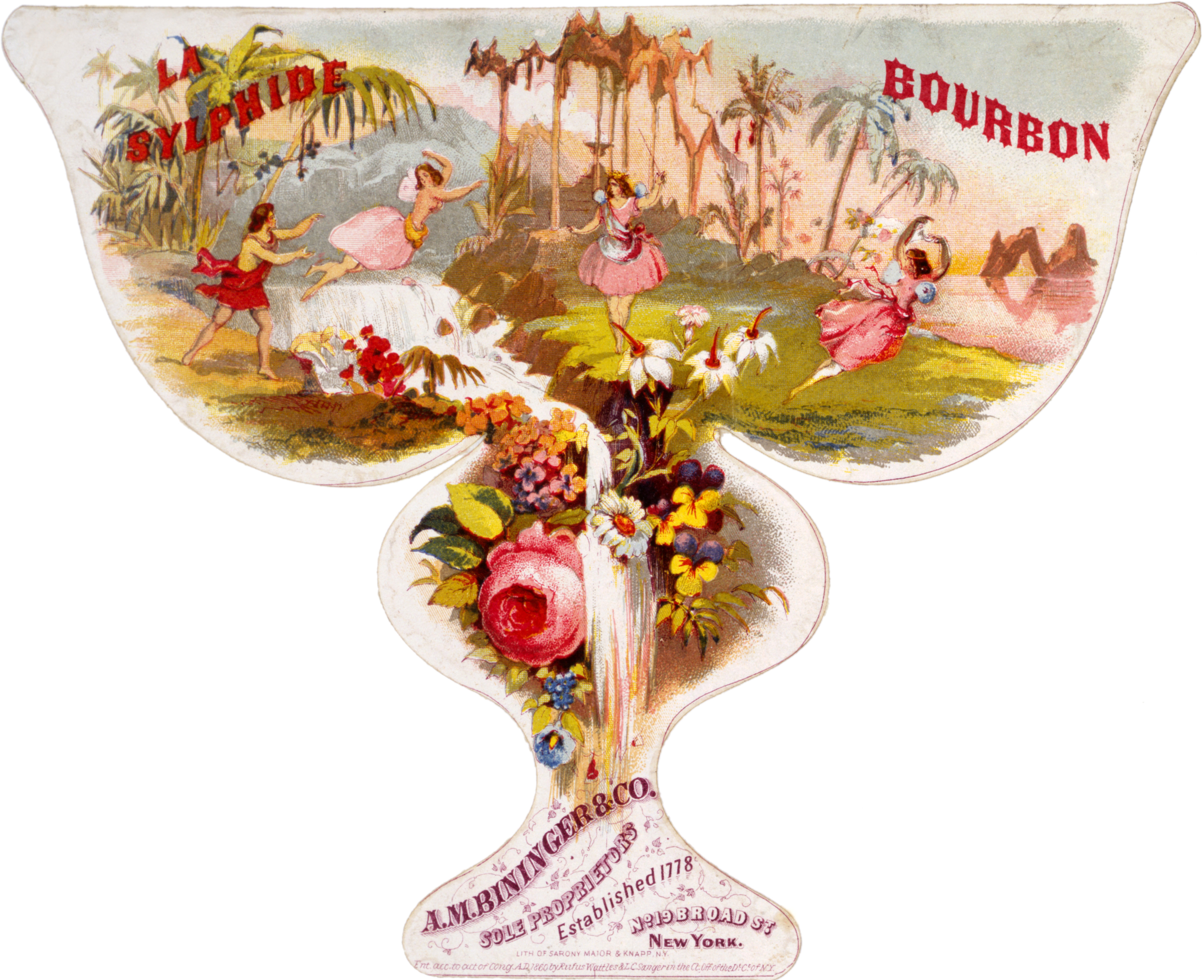
La Sylphide Bourbon, A.M. Bininger & Co. Bourbon advertising label in the shape of a glass showing a man pursuing three sylphs

The Swiss–German physician and alchemist Theophrastus von Hohenheim ("Paracelsus") first coined the term sylph in the 16th century to describe an air spirit in his overarching scheme of elemental spirits associated with the four Classical elements. Paracelsus drew from earlier sources, but his systematic treatment of the idea was definitive, with the names of three of the four types having originated in his works. The other three elemental spirits named were Gnomes (earth), Salamanders (fire), and Undines (water). These ideas were adopted in Rosicrucianism and were widely encountered in subsequent hermetic literature.

In the Liber de Nymphis of the Philosophia Magna, Paracelsus discusses the characteristics of the elementals at length. Sylphs, he says, are rougher, coarser, taller, and stronger than humans. The elementals are said to be able to move through their own elements as human beings move through air. Because of this, sylphs are the closest to humans in his conception because they move through air like we do, while in fire they burn, in water they drown, and in earth, they get stuck.

== In literature ==
Sylphs are mentioned by that name in the 1668 German novel Simplicius Simplicissimus, though its author Grimmelshausen seems to have taken them to be water spirits.

The French pseudo-novel Comte de Gabalis (1670) was important in passing sylphs into the literary sphere. It appears to have originated the derivative term "sylphid" (French sylphide), which it uses as the feminine counterpart to "sylph". While modern scholars consider Comte de Gabalis to have been intended as a satire of occult philosophy, many of its contemporaries considered it to be an earnest exposition of occult lore. Its author, Abbé de Montfaucon de Villars, was assassinated on the road in 1673 and one rumor had it that he had been killed by a gang of sylphs for disclosing their secrets.

One of the best-known discussions of sylphs comes with Alexander Pope. In Rape of the Lock (final ed. 1717), Pope satirizes French Rosicrucian and alchemical writings when he invents a theory to explain the sylph. In a parody of heroic poetry and the "dark" and "mysterious" alchemical literature, and in particular the sometimes esoterically Classical heroic poetry of the 18th century in England and France, Pope pretends to have a new alchemy, in which the sylph is the mystically, chemically condensed humors of peevish women. In Pope's poem, women who are full of spleen and vanity turn into sylphs when they die because their spirits are too full of dark vapors to ascend to the skies. Belinda, the heroine of Pope's poem, is attended by a small army of sylphs, who foster her vanity and guard her beauty.

The poem is a parody of Paracelsian ideas, inasmuch as Pope imitates the pseudo-science of alchemy to explain the seriousness with which vain women approach the dressing room. In a slight parody of the divine battle in Pope's Rape of the Lock, when the Baron of the poem attempts to cut a lock of Belinda's hair, the sylphs interpose their airy bodies between the blades of the scissors (to no effect whatsoever).

Ariel, the chief sylph in the Rape of the Lock, has the same name as Prospero's servant Ariel in Shakespeare's The Tempest (ca. 1611), and Shakespeare's character is described literally as an "airy spirit" in the dramatis personae. This name was generally thought to have been original with Shakespeare, though the exact inspiration for the character is unclear. Pope explicitly cited Comte de Gabalis as a source for elemental lore in the dedication.

In the 1778 British novel The Sylph, a sylph appears as a guardian spirit for the female protagonist.

By 1765, the French author Jean-François Marmontel had found the sylph legend notable enough that he included among his Moral Tales the story of "the Sylph-Husband," in which a young woman obsessed with the idea of marrying a sylph is deluded into falling in love with her arranged-husband after he impersonates one.

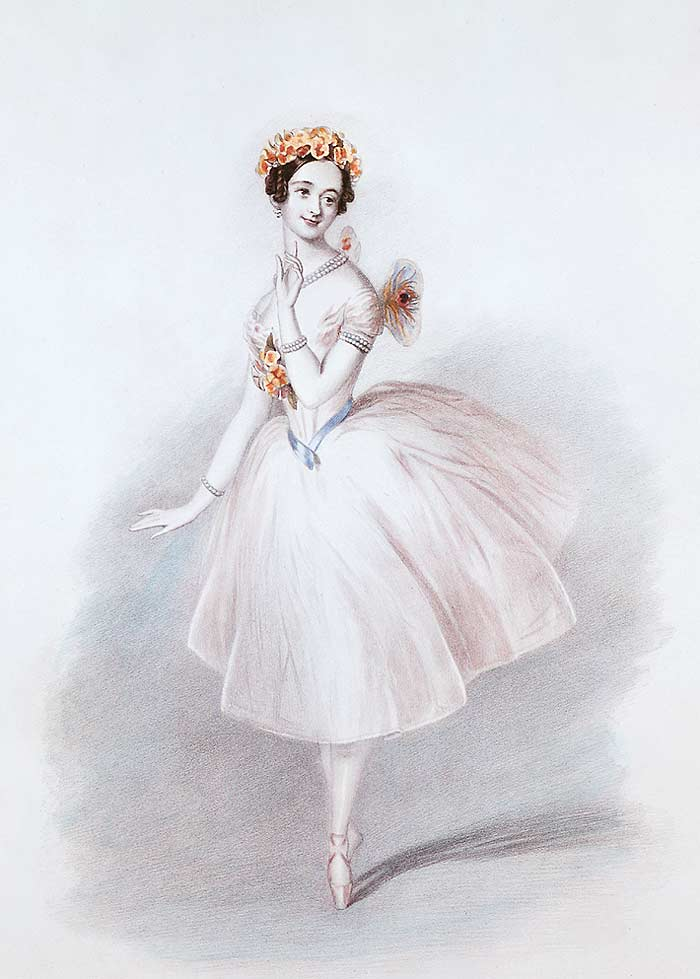
Marie Taglioni in La Sylphide

In Fernando Pessoa's "Book of Disquiet", (entry 214 - New Directions, 2017) he writes (translated from the Portuguese by Margaret Jill Costa): "And as with books so with everything else...Given that anything can be dreamed to serve as a real interruption to the silent flow of my days, I raise eyes of weary protest to the sylph who is mine alone, to the poor girl who, had she only learned to sing, could perhaps have been a siren".

== In ballet and opera ==
The famous ballet La Sylphide ("The (Female) Sylph", Paris, 1832) is a prominent example of sylph lore in theater in the 19th century. It appeared in a second version in Denmark in 1836. A similarly themed opera The Mountain Sylph appeared in England in 1834. Sylphs again took to the stage in the 1909 ballet Les Sylphides.

== In popular culture ==
- Willow, a character in Terry Brooks' Magic Kingdom of Landover series of novels (1986), is a sylph and the wife of protagonist Ben Holiday. She is the daughter of the River Master and a wood elemental, giving her pale green skin and emerald hair. Her dual nature is reflected in the fact that she must transform into a willow tree once every 21 days to maintain her life force. She has a tense and distant relationship with her father, as her existence serves as a permanent reminder to him of the brief relationship he desires to reclaim, but never can. And so it is to her mother that she turns for guidance.
- The Silph Company, featured prominently within the Pokémon franchise, manufactures a device called the Silph Scope, which allows the user to view spectral entities otherwise unidentifiable to the naked eye. Some Pokémon are known for being inspired by the sylph.
- In Brandon Sanderson's The Stormlight Archive series of novels (2010), the character Sylphrena is introduced as a windspren, a creature that is drawn to the element of wind and its characteristics. As other windspren, Sylphrena (Syl) possesses the ability to travel freely through the air and change her form—allowing her to adopt the features of a human, beast, or anything she wishes, including a ribbon of light.
- The lyrics of the song "Desire As" by Prefab Sprout from their 1985 album Steve McQueen mentions a "sylph-figured creature that changes her mind". The same lyric is quoted in a song by LYR, called "Winter Solstice", featuring poet laureate Simon Armitage.
- Ellen Hutter, a character in Nosferatu (2024), is referred to as a sylph by Herr Knock.

== Association with fairies ==
Because of their association with the ballet La Sylphide, where sylphs are identified with fairies and the medieval legends of fairyland, as well as a confusion with other "airy spirits" (e.g., in William Shakespeare's A Midsummer Night's Dream), a slender girl may be referred to as a sylph.

"Sylph" has passed into general language as a term for minor spirits, elementals, or faeries of the air. Fantasy authors will sometimes employ sylphs in their fiction, for example creating giant artistic clouds in the skies with airy wings.

== See also ==
- Apsara
- Ekendriya
- Elemental
- Fairy
- Gandharva
- Gnome
- Salamander
- Undine
