= Chauncey Ives =

American neoclassicist sculptor (1810–1894)

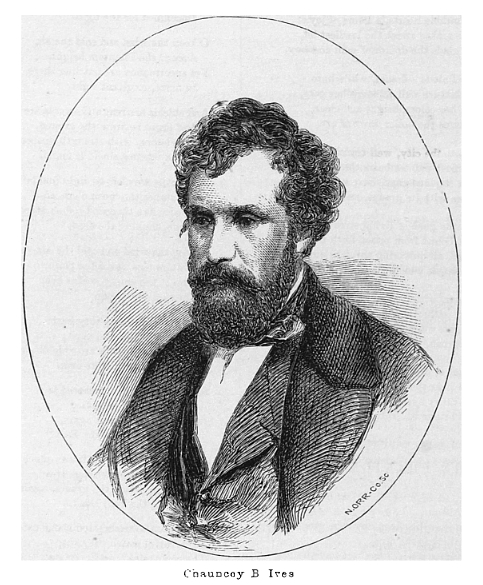
- Ives in a c. 1880 publication
- Born: December 14, 1810; Hamden, Connecticut, US
- Died: 1894 (aged 83–84); Rome, Italy
- Education: largely self-taught
- Known for: Sculpture
- Movement: Neo-classic

Chauncey Bradley Ives (December 14, 1810 – 1894) was an American sculptor who worked primarily in the Neo-Classic style. His best known works are the marble statues of Jonathan Trumbull and Roger Sherman (Roger Sherman) enshrined in the National Statuary Hall Collection.

== Biography ==
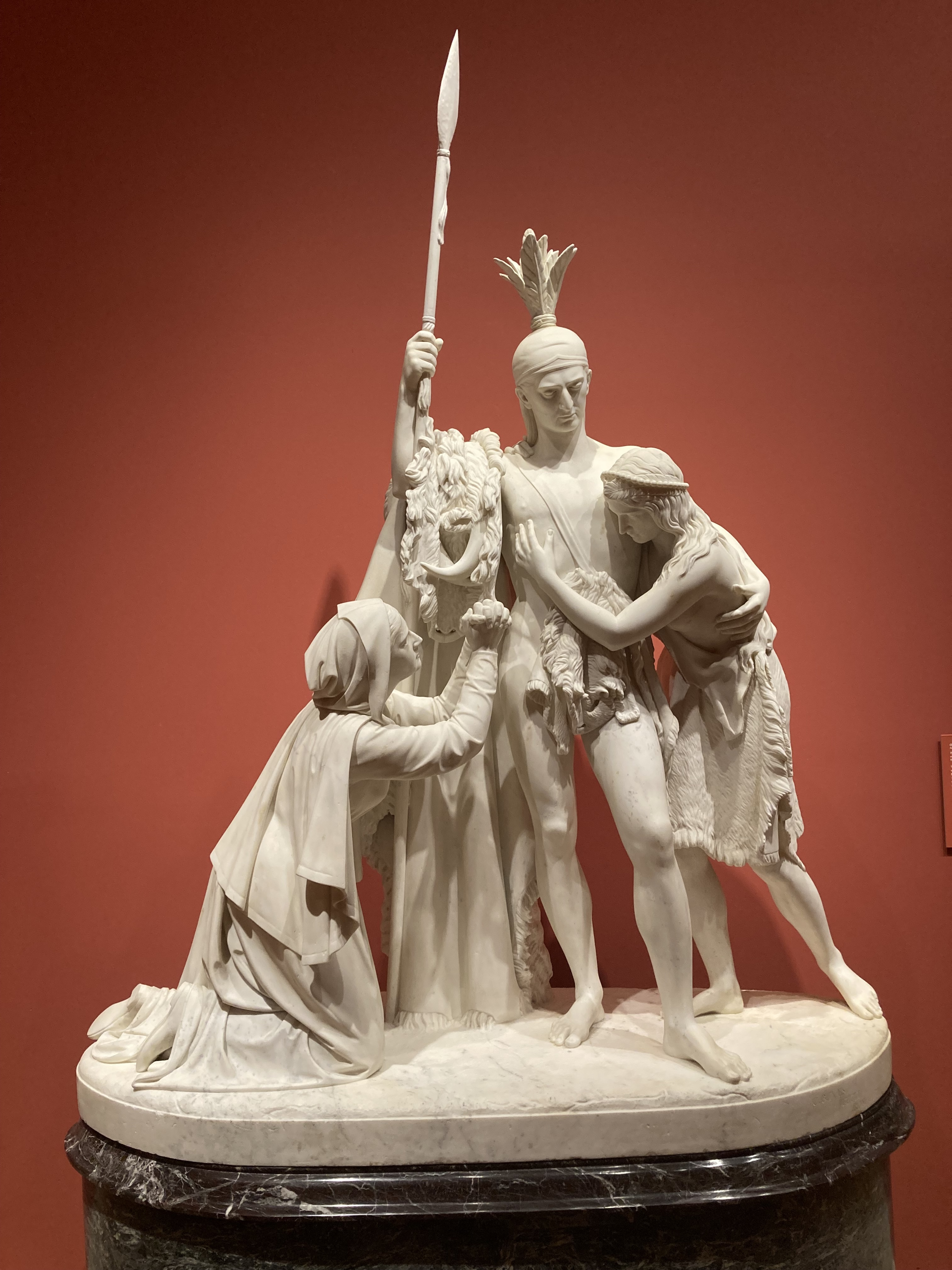
The Willing Captive

Ives was born in Hamden, Connecticut and at the age of 16 was apprenticed to Rodolphus Northrop, a woodcarver in nearby New Haven. He may also have studied with Hezekiah Augur, another local woodcarver who was a pioneer American marble carver.

Shortly thereafter Ives turned to marble carving and began carving portraits, first in Boston, Massachusetts and then in New York City.

In 1844 poor health (and, according to Craven, p. 235, perhaps too much competition from other sculptors in Boston and New York) prompted Ives to move to Europe, where he ultimately settled in the expatriate artist community. He moved to Rome in 1851, remaining in Italy for the rest of his life. His final resting place is in the Protestant Cemetery, Rome.

Ives' statue of Undine Rising from the Waters (1884) remains one of the icons of the American neo-classical movement, being selected to grace the front covers of at least three books about sculpture, American Sculpture at Yale University, Marble Queens and Captives and A Marble Quarry, where the back of the statue also serves as the book's back cover. Ives was to revisit the subject of Undine in another work, Undine Rising from the Fountain.

Ives' reputation did not survive much longer than his life. Art historian and sculptor Lorado Taft includes him in Taft's seminal book The History of American Sculpture in a chapter entitled Some Minor Sculptors of the Early Years, and says of his Trumbull and Sherman statues at the Connecticut State Capitol, "Descriptions of these curious works would be unprofitable. They fit in nicely with the majority of their companions, but of all the dead man there they seem the most conscious of being dead."

Unlike most of his other works The Willing Captive (c. 1862–68), while still designed to appeal to the 19th-century desire for sentimentality in art, contained more content than is typically found in art of that era. The work, subtitled An Historical Incident of November, 1764, depicts a real event that occurred during the French and Indian War in which a young woman is torn between the Natives that she has been living with after being captured by them and a white woman, her mother, who has come to take her back. An 1886 bronze cast of the work now resides in Lincoln Park in Newark, New Jersey.

== Portraits ==
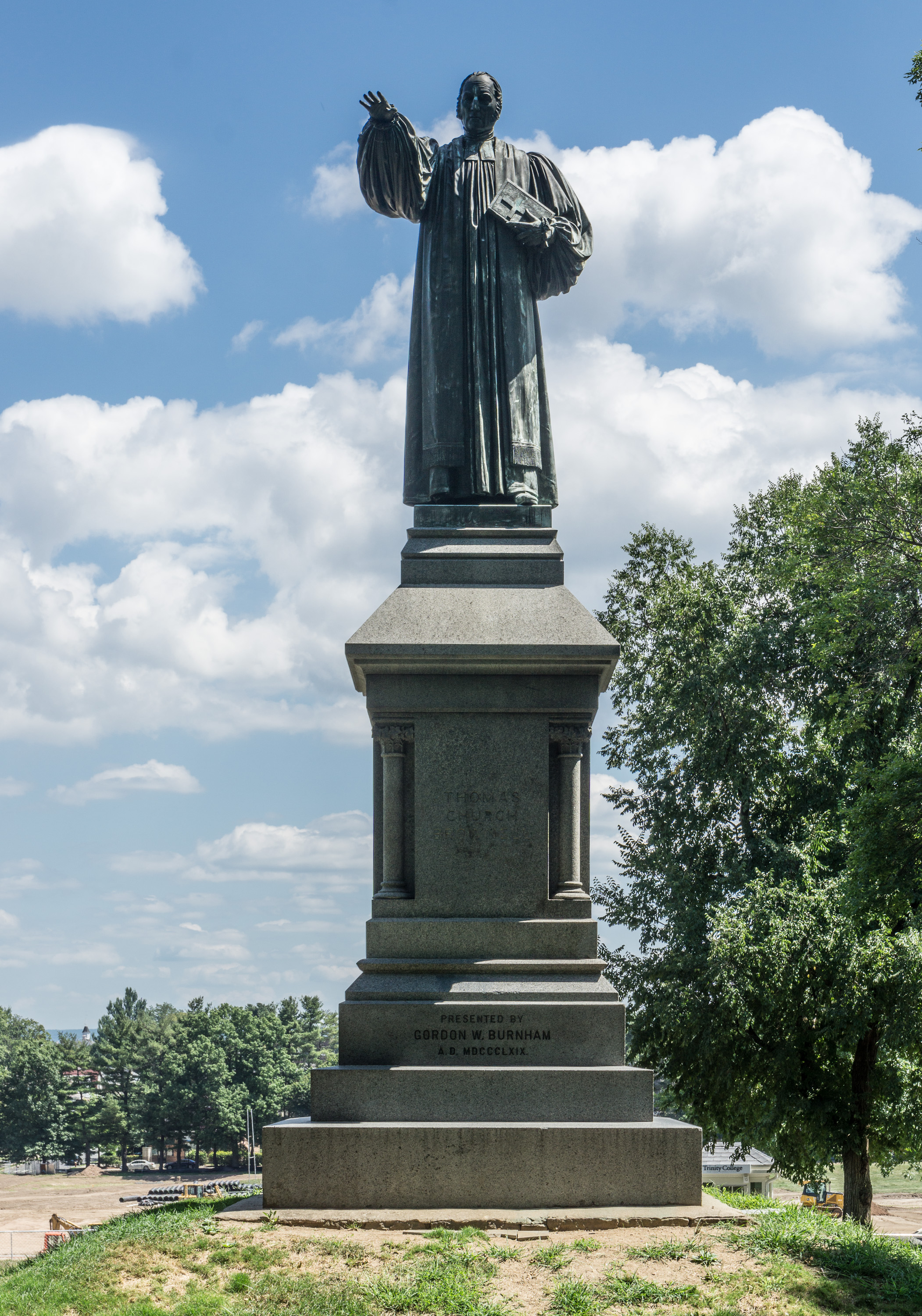
Statue of Thomas Church Brownell at Trinity College, Hartford, Connecticut.

Ives created many portraits of the well known and not so well known persons of his time, many created in Rome of wealthy Americans who were traveling in Europe. Some of these portrait statues and busts include ones of:

- Thomas Church Brownell (1869), Hartford, Connecticut
- Roger Sherman, (1870), National Statuary Hall Collection, United States Capitol, Washington D. C.
- Noah Webster, (1840)
- William H. Seward, (1857)
- Edward Hitchcock
- Roger Sherman, (1878)
- Jonathan Trumbull, (1878)
- Jeremiah Day
- Thomas Day, (1842)
- Rev. Dr. Nathaniel William Taylor, (1860)
- Ithiel Town
- Frances Pierce & her infant daughter. (1864) Rosehill Cemetery, United States, Chicago

== Mythical and allegorical subjects ==
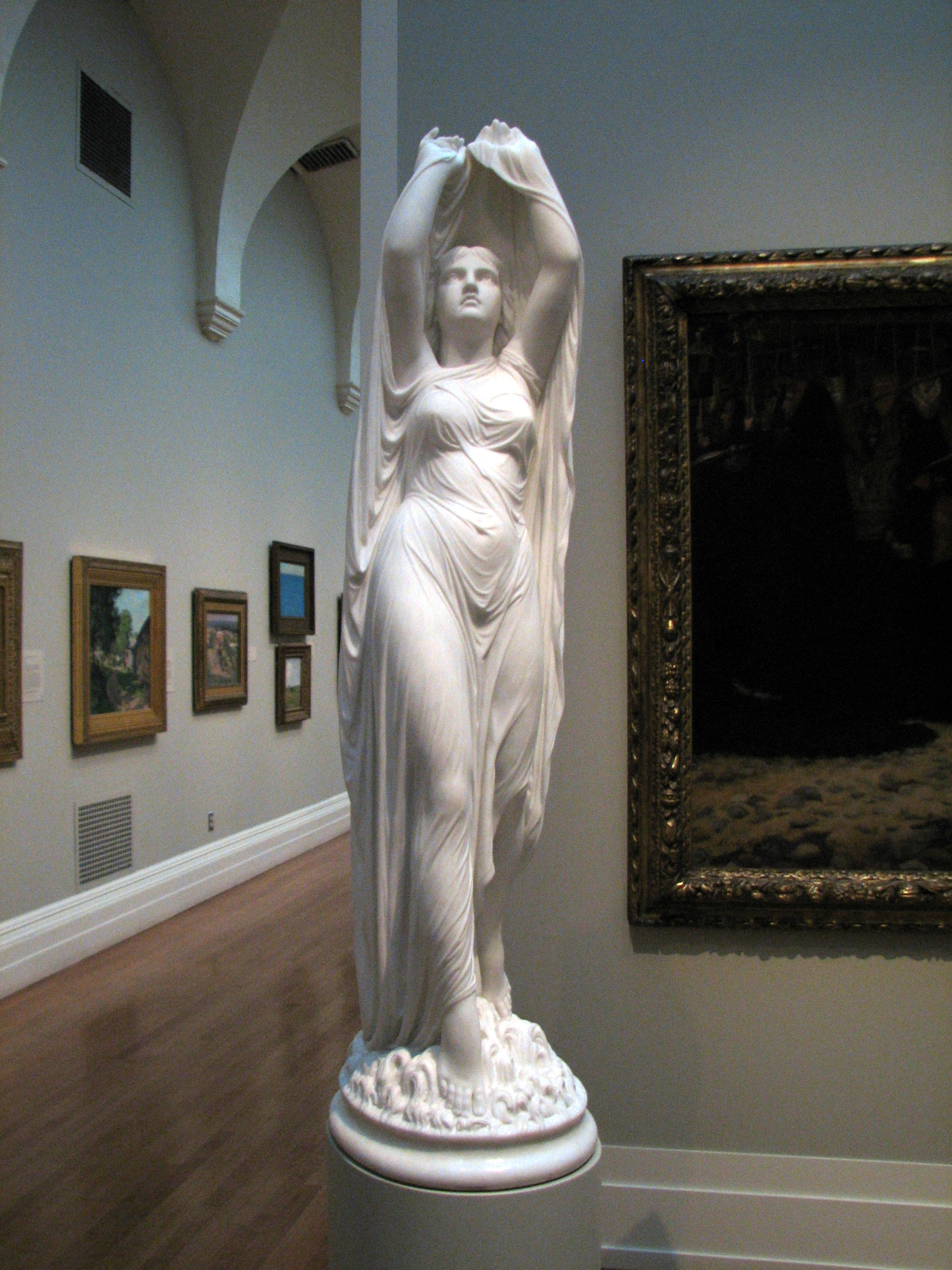
Undine Rising from the Waters

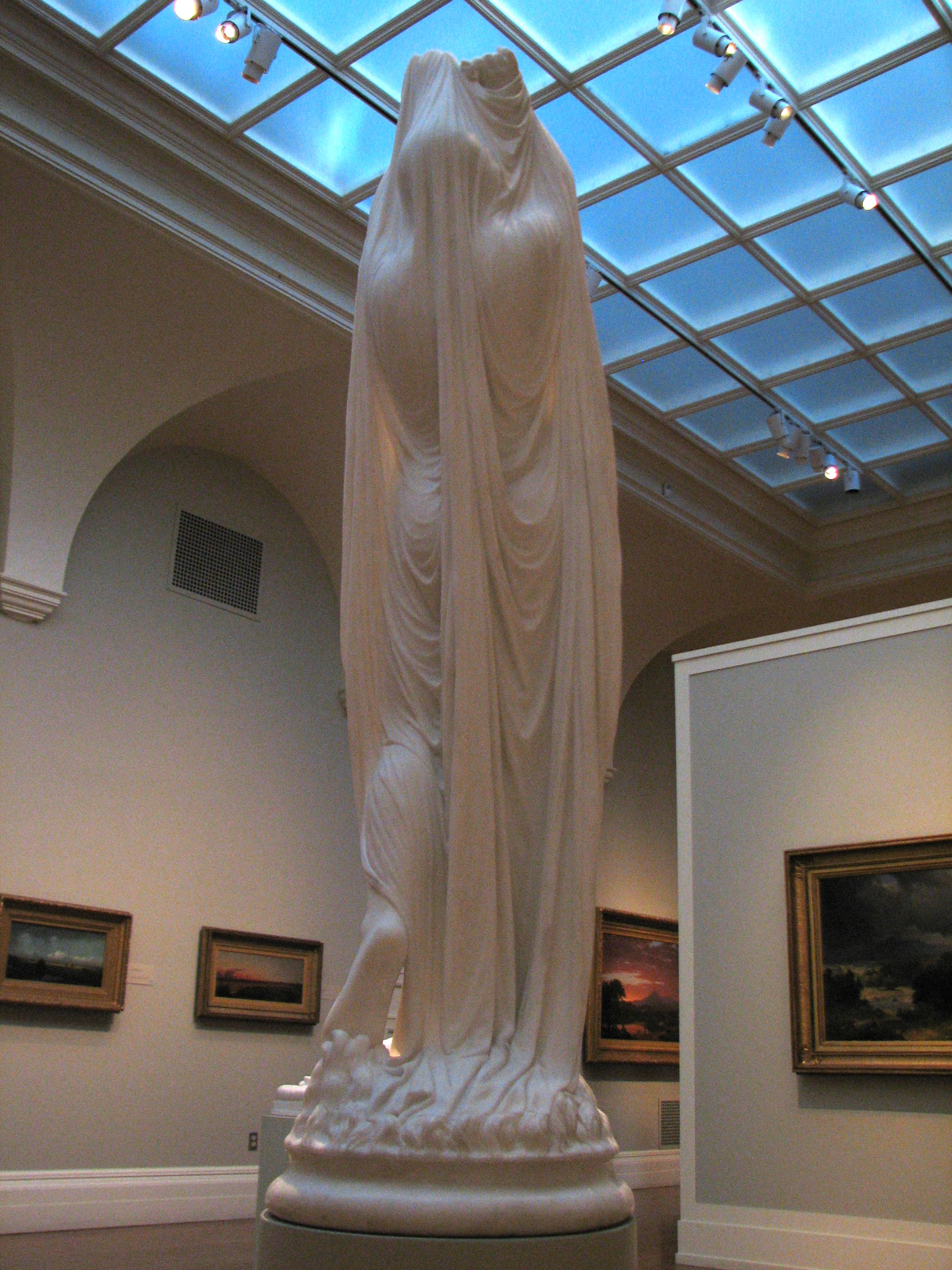
Light shines through the back of Undine's garment.

Like many other Victorian era artists Ives studio in Rome generated a large number of works drawn from Greek and other mythologies. Works in this oeuvre include his statues of:

- Pandora
- Ariadne
- Ceres
- Undine
- Jephthah's Daughter
- Rebecca at the Well
- Nursing the Infant Bacchus
- Flora
- Egeria
- The Hebrew Captive
- Ruth

== Collections ==
Works by Ives can be found in numerous collections, including:

- Buffalo History Museum, Buffalo, New York
- Amherst College, Mead Art Museum, Amherst, Massachusetts
- Lyman Allyn Museum, New London, Connecticut
- Connecticut State Capitol, Hartford, Connecticut
- Yale University Art Gallery, New Haven, Connecticut
- Corcoran Gallery of Art, Washington D.C.
- Smithsonian Museum of American Art, Washington D.C.
- New York Historical Society, New York City
- Museum of Fine Arts, Boston, Massachusetts
- Maryland Historical Society, Baltimore, Maryland
- Cincinnati Historical Society, Cincinnati, Ohio
- Cincinnati Museum of Art, Cincinnati, Ohio
- University of Tennessee, Ackien Mansion, Nashville, Tennessee
- State Historical Society of Wisconsin, Madison, Wisconsin
- Peabody Essex Museum, Salem, Massachusetts
- Metropolitan Museum of Art, New York City
- Virginia Museum of Fine Arts, Richmond, Virginia
- Chrysler Museum, Norfolk, Virginia
- Art Institute of Chicago, Chicago, Illinois
- Detroit Institute of Arts, Detroit, Michigan
- High Museum of Art, Atlanta, Georgia

== Sources ==
- Compilation of Works of Art and Other Objects in the United States Capitol, Prepared by the Architect of the Capitol under the Joint Committee on the Library, United States Government Printing House, Washington, 1965
- Craven, Wayne, Sculpture in America, Thomas Y. Crowell Co, NY, NY 1968
- Greenthal, Kozol, Rameirez & Fairbanks, American Figurative Sculpture in the Museum of Fine Arts, Boston, Museum of Fine Arts, Boston 1986
- Murdock, Myrtle Cheney, National Statuary Hall in the Nation's Capitol, Monumental Press, Inc., Washington D.C., 1955
- Opitz, Glenn B, Editor, Mantle Fielding’s Dictionary of American Painters, Sculptors & Engravers, Apollo Book, Poughkeepsie NY, 1986
- Taft, Lorado, The History of American Sculpture, MacMillan Co., New York, NY 1925
- Thurkow, Fearn, Newark's Sculpture: A Survey of Public Monuments and Memorial Statuary, The Newark Museum Quarterly, Newark Museum Association, Winter 1975
- Lauren Keach Lessing (2006). Presiding Divinities: Ideal Sculpture in Nineteenth-Century American Domestic Interiors. Ph.D. dissertation: Indiana University.
