= Comte de Gabalis =

French text by Abbé Nicolas-Pierre-Henri de Montfaucon de Villars

Comte de Gabalis is a 17th-century French text by Abbé Nicolas-Pierre-Henri de Montfaucon de Villars (1635–1673). The titular "Comte de Gabalis" ("Count of Cabala") is an esotericist who explains the mysteries of the world to the author. It first appeared in Paris in 1670, anonymously, though the identity of the author came to be known. The original title as published by Claude Barbin was Le comte de Gabalis, ou entretiens sur les sciences secrètes, "The Count of Cabala, Or Dialogs on the Secret Sciences".

The book was widely read in France and abroad, and is a source for many of the "marvelous beings" that populate later European literature. French readers include Charles Baudelaire and Anatole France – it was the main source for his At the Sign of the Reine Pédauque (1892). In English literature, it influenced Alexander Pope, who borrowed from it to create the sylphs in The Rape of the Lock (1714), and in German, it is a likely source for Friedrich de la Motte Fouqué's Undine. In recent times it has been considered by some to have been intended as a satire of occult philosophy, though in its time it was taken seriously by many readers. Many later authors have also taken it to be a serious source, including Edward Bulwer-Lytton and prominent occult writers Éliphas Lévi, Helena Blavatsky and M. P. Hall.
