= Undine (disambiguation) =

Undine is a category of elemental beings associated with water.

Undine may also refer to:

== Arts and entertainment ==
=== Fictional characters and races ===
- Undine, a race in the video game Primal
- Undine, the formal name of Species 8472 in the video game Star Trek Online
- Undine, a race in the video game Yggdra Union
- Undine, a character in the manga and anime series Claymore
- Undine Spragg, the protagonist of Edith Wharton's novel The Custom of the Country (1913)
- Undine Wells, the protagonist of the webcomic Sleepless Domain

=== Film ===
- Undine (1916 film), a 1916 American silent fantasy drama film based upon the novel by de la Motte Fouqué
- Undine (2020 film), a 2020 German film

=== Literature ===
- Undine (novella) (1811), a novella by Friedrich de la Motte Fouqué
- Undine (1964), a novel by Phyllis Brett Young
- Undine (2004), a novel by Penni Russon
- Undine, an autobiographical book by Olive Schreiner (1928)
- "Undine geht", a short story by Ingeborg Bachmann (1961)
- "Undine", a poem by Seamus Heaney (1969)
- Undine, a term for a gondolier in the manga and anime series Aria

=== Music ===
- Sonata Undine, a Romantic sonata for flute and piano (in E-minor) by Carl Reinecke
- Undine, a prelude for piano by Claude Debussy (1911–13)
- "Undine", a song on Laura Marling's fourth album, Once I Was an Eagle
- Undine, the opening theme song for the manga Aria, from the Yui Makino album Tenkyū no Ongaku

=== Theatre ===
- Undine (Hoffmann), an opera by E.T.A. Hoffmann (1814)
- Undine (Lortzing), an opera by Albert Lortzing (1845)

=== Visual art ===
- Undine (Waterhouse painting), by John William Waterhouse (1872)
- Undine, a graffito by Harald Naegeli (1978)

== Places ==
- Undine, Georgia, a community in the United States
- Undine, Michigan, ghost town
- Villa Undine, a resort architecture mansion in Binz, Rugia Island, Germany

== Ships ==
- HMS Undine, eight ships in the Royal Navy
- SMS Undine, a ship in the German High Seas Fleet
- USS Undine, two ships in the United States Navy
- Undine (Colorado River sternwheeler), a steamboat on the Colorado River
- Undine (Columbia River sternwheeler), a steamboat on the Columbia River

== Other uses ==
- Undine (medical), an ophthalmic irrigation device (now little used)
- Undine Barge Club, an amateur rowing club in Philadelphia, Pennsylvania

== See also ==
- Undyne, character in the video game Undertale
- Ondine (disambiguation)
- Undina (disambiguation)
