= Melusine =

Water sprite

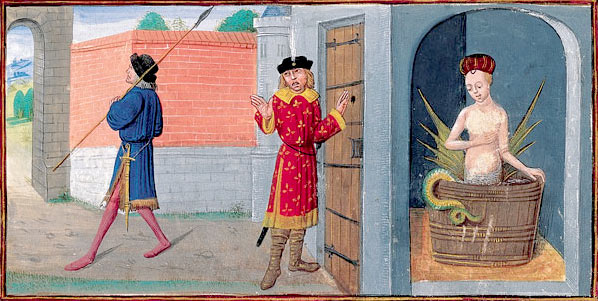
Melusine's secret discovered, from Le Roman de Mélusine by Jean d'Arras, c. 1450–1500. Bibliothèque nationale de France.

Mélusine (French: [melyzin]) or Melusine or Melusina is a figure of European folklore, a female spirit of fresh water in a holy well or river. She is usually depicted as a woman who is a serpent or fish from the waist down (much like a lamia or a mermaid). She is also sometimes illustrated with wings, two tails, or both. Her legends are especially connected with the northern and western areas of France, Luxembourg, and the Low Countries.

The Limburg-Luxemburg dynasty (which ruled the Holy Roman Empire from 1308 to 1437 as well as Bohemia and Hungary), the House of Anjou and their descendants the House of Plantagenet (kings of England), and the French House of Lusignan (kings of Cyprus from 1205–1472, and for shorter periods over Cilician Armenia and Jerusalem) are said in folk tales and medieval literature to be descended from Melusine. The story combines several major legendary themes, such as the Nereids, Naiad, water nymph or mermaid, the earth being (terroir), the genius loci or guardian spirit of a location, the succubus who comes from the diabolical world to unite carnally with a man, or the banshee or harbinger of death.

== Etymology ==
The French Dictionnaire de la langue française suggests the Latin melus, meaning "melodious, pleasant". Another theory is that Melusine was inspired by a Poitevin legend of "Mère Lusine", the female leader of a band of fairies who built Roman edifices throughout the countryside. Melusine's name varies depending on the areas, such as Merlusse in Vosges or Merluisaine in Champagne.

== Literary versions ==
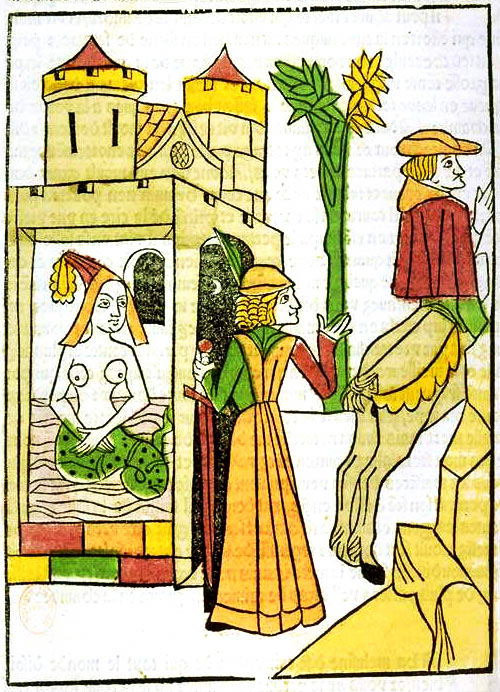
Raymond walks in on his wife, Melusine, in her bath and discovers she has the lower body of a serpent. Illustration from the Jean d'Arras work, Le livre de Mélusine (The Book of Melusine), 1478.

The most famous literary version of Melusine tales, that of Jean d'Arras, was written in 1393. He goes into detail and depth about the relationship of Melusine and Raymondin, their initial meeting, and the story of the Lusignan family. A verse redaction, The Romans of Partenay, was written by Coudrette shortly after.

The tale was translated into German in 1456 by Thüring von Ringoltingen, which version became popular as a chapbook. It was later translated into English, twice, around 1500, and often printed in both the 15th century and the 16th century. There are also a Castilian and a Dutch translation, both of which were printed at the end of the 15th century. A prose version is entitled the Chronique de la princesse (Chronicle of the Princess).

The story tells how in the time of the Crusades, Elinas, the King of Albany, goes out hunting in the forest to cope with the death of his wife with whom he has one son named Nathas. Elinas comes across the Well of Thirst where he meets a beautiful fay named Pressine. The two fall in love and when Elinas proposes to Pressine, she agrees, but only if he swears to never see her when she births or bathes their children; Elinas promises and he and Pressine marry. Later, Pressine gives birth to triplet girls named Melusine, Melior, and Palatine. When Nathas informs his father the news, the king breaks his promise, causing Pressine to leave the kingdom with their three daughters and move to the lost Isle of Avalon.

The three sisters grow up in Avalon, their mother bringing them atop a mountain every morning to look at the kingdom that would have been their home. On their fifteenth birthday, Melusine, the eldest, asks her mother why she and her sisters had been taken from Alba. Upon hearing of their father's broken promise, Melusine seeks revenge and convinces her sisters to aid her. Using their magical powers, Elinas' daughters lock him, with his riches, in a mountain called Brandelois. Pressine becomes enraged when she learns what her daughters have done for despite breaking his promise, Elinas was her husband and the triplets' father. To punish her daughters for killing their own father, Pressine imprisons Palatine in the same mountain as Elinas, seals Melior inside a castle for all her life, and banishes Melusine, the instigator, from Avalon and also cursing her to take the form of a two-tailed serpent from the waist down every Saturday. If a man ever marries Melusine, he must never see her on Saturdays: if he keeps the oath, Melusine will live a contented life with him, but if he breaks it and violates her privacy, she will stay a serpent and appear to the Noble House in her monstrous form and spend three days lamenting whenever a descendant dies or the fortress changes hands.

Melusine settles in a forest of Coulombiers by a stream near Poitiers (or Poitou in some versions). The distraught Count Raymondin of Poitiers comes across Melusine after accidentally killing his uncle. Melusine consoles Raymondin and when he proposes to her, she lays down a condition just as her mother had done: that he must never see her on a Saturday. For ten years Raymondin keeps his promise, and Melusine bears him ten sons (which some versions describe as being deformed yet still loved by their parents) and organizes the construction of marvelous castles, giving her husband wealth, land, and power. However, Raymondin is eventually goaded by his family and grows suspicious of Melusine always spending Saturday by herself and never attending Mass. He breaks his promise and peeks into her chamber, where he sees Melusine bathing in half-serpent form. He keeps his transgression a secret, until one of their now-adult sons murders his brother. In front of his court, the grieving Raymondin blames Melusine and calls her a "serpent." She then assumes the form of a dragon, provides him with two magic rings, and flies off, never to be seen again. She returns only at night to nurse her two youngest children, who are still infants.

== Analysis ==
In folkloristics, German folklorist Hans-Jörg Uther classifies the Melusine tale and related legends as its own tale type of the Aarne-Thompson-Uther Index. In the German Folktale Catalogue (German: Deutscher Märchenkatalog), they are grouped under type *425O, "Melusine", part of a section related to tales where a human maiden marries a supernatural husband in animal form (Animal as Bridegroom).

As in tales of swan maidens, shapeshifting and flight on wings away from oath-breaking husbands feature in stories about Mélusine. According to Sabine Baring-Gould in Curious Tales of the Middle Ages, the pattern of the tale is similar to the Knight of the Swan legend which inspired the character "Lohengrin" in Wolfram von Eschenbach's Parzival.

Jacques Le Goff considered that Melusina represented a fertility figure: "she brings prosperity in a rural area...Melusina is the fairy of medieval economic growth".

== Other versions ==
=== In France ===
Melusine legends are especially connected with the northern areas of France, Poitou and the Low Countries, as well as Cyprus, where the French Lusignan royal house that ruled the island from 1192 to 1489 claimed to be descended from Melusine. Oblique reference to this was made by Sir Walter Scott who told a Melusine tale in Minstrelsy of the Scottish Border (1802–1803) stating that "the reader will find the fairy of Normandy, or Bretagne, adorned with all the splendour of Eastern description". The fairy Melusina, also, who married Guy de Lusignan, Count of Poitou, under condition that he should never attempt to intrude upon her privacy, was of this latter class. She bore the count many children, and erected for him a magnificent castle by her magical art. Their harmony was uninterrupted until the prying husband broke the conditions of their union, by concealing himself to behold his wife make use of her enchanted bath. Hardly had Melusina discovered the indiscreet intruder, than, transforming herself into a dragon, she departed with a loud yell of lamentation, and was never again visible to mortal eyes; although, even in the days of Brantôme, she was supposed to be the protectress of her descendants, and was heard wailing as she sailed upon the blast round the turrets of the castle of Lusignan the night before it was demolished.

=== In Luxembourg ===
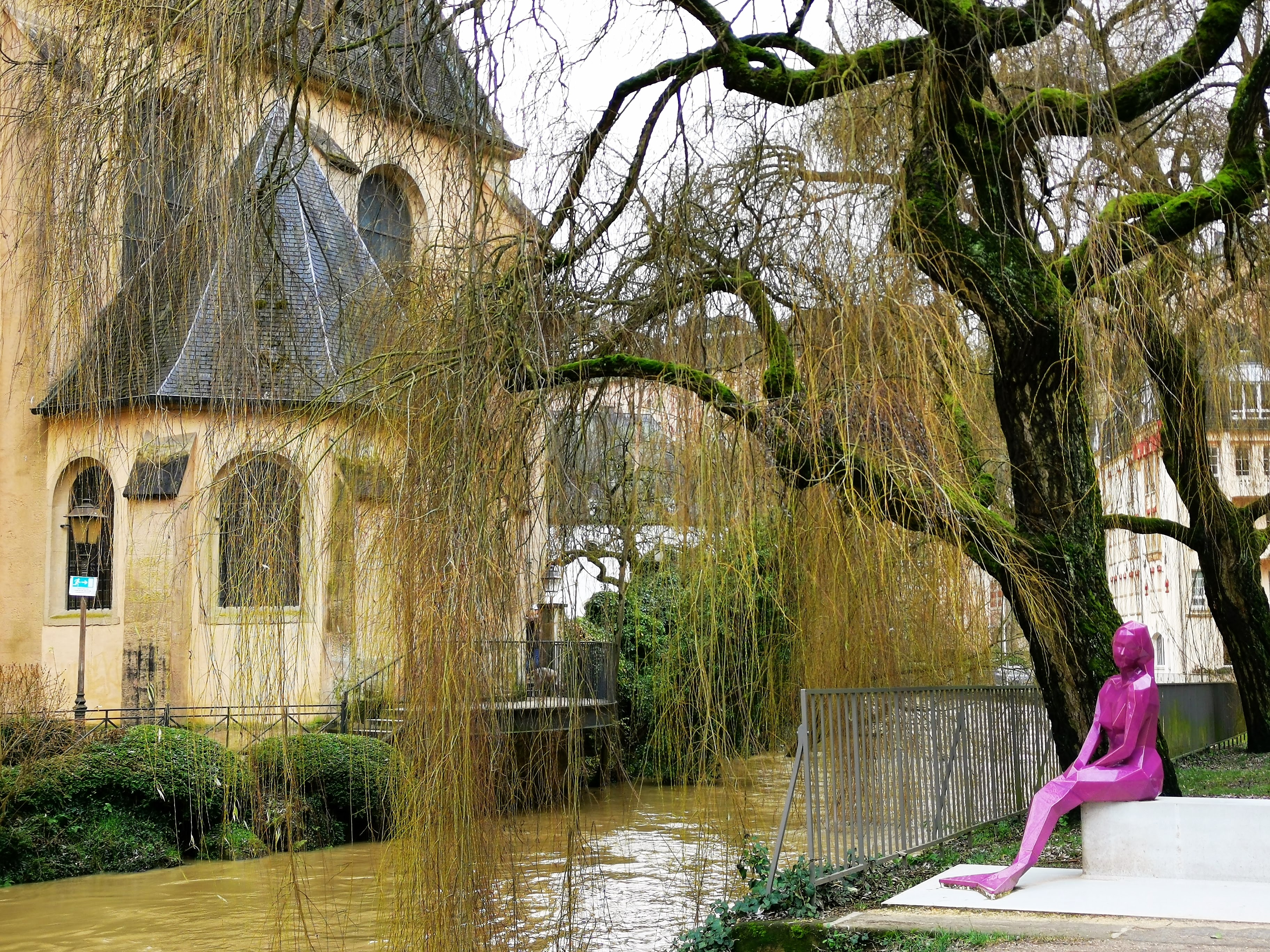
Statue of Melusine near the Alzette in Luxembourg

The Counts of Luxembourg also claimed descent from Melusine through their ancestor Siegfried. When in 963 A.D. Count Siegfried of the Ardennes (Sigefroi in French; Sigfrid in Luxembourgish) bought the feudal rights to the territory on which he founded his capital city of Luxembourg, his name became connected with the local version of Melusine. This Melusina had essentially the same magic gifts as the ancestress of the Lusignans. The morning after their wedding, she magically created the Castle of Luxembourg on the Bock rock (the historical center point of Luxembourg City). On her terms of marriage, she too required one day of absolute privacy each week. Eventually Sigfrid was tempted by curiosity and entered her apartment on Saturday, when he saw her in her bath and discovered her to be a mermaid. He cried out in surprise, and Melusina and her bath sank into the earth. Melusine remained trapped in the rock but returns every seven years either as a woman or a serpent, carrying a golden key in her mouth. Anyone brave enough to take the key will free her and win her as his bride. Also every seven years, Melusine adds a stitch to a linen chemise; if she finishes the chemise before she can be freed, all of Luxembourg will be swallowed by the rock. In 1997, Luxembourg issued a postage stamp commemorating her.

=== In Germany ===
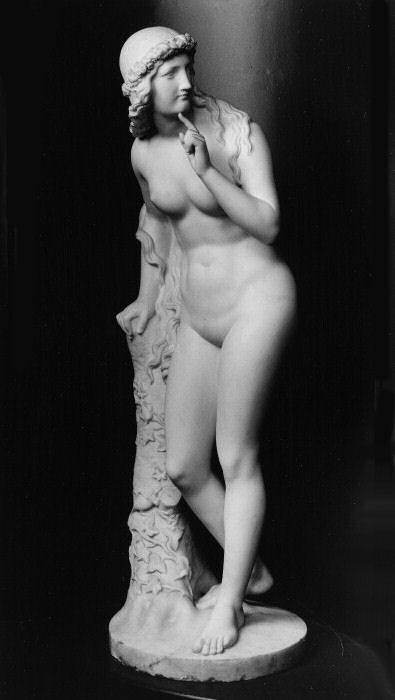
Melusine by Ludwig Michael von Schwanthaler (1845)

In his Table Talk, Martin Luther mentioned Melusina of Lucelberg (Luxembourg), whom he described as a succubus or the devil. Luther attributed stories like Melusine to the devil appearing in female form to seduce men.

The story of Melusine strongly influenced Paracelsus's writings on elementals and especially his description of water spirits. This, in turn, inspired Friedrich de la Motte Fouqué's novella Undine (1811), and a collaboration on the subject with composer E. T. A. Hoffmann, in which Fouqué wrote the libretto for Hoffman's opera Undine (1816). Other adaptations and references of Fouqué's story are found in works such as Hans Christian Andersen's fairy tale The Little Mermaid (1837), Antonín Dvořák's opera Rusalka (1901), and Jean Giraudoux's play Ondine (1939).

In a legend set in the forest of Stollenwald, a young man meets a beautiful woman named Melusina who has the lower body of a snake. If he will kiss her three times on three consecutive days, she will be freed. However, on each day she becomes more and more monstrous, until the young man flees in terror without giving her the final kisses. He later marries another girl, but the food at their wedding feast is mysteriously poisoned with serpent venom and everyone who eats it dies.

Other Germanic water sprites include Lorelei and the nixie.

=== In Britain ===
Melusine is one of the pre-Christian water-faeries who were sometimes responsible for changelings. The "Lady of the Lake", who spirited away the infant Lancelot and raised the child, was such a water nymph.

A folktale tradition of a demon wife similar to Melusine appears in early English literature. According to the chronicler Gerald of Wales, Richard I of England was fond of telling a tale that he was a descendant of an unnamed countess of Anjou. In the legend, an early Count of Anjou encountered a beautiful woman from a foreign land. They were married and had four sons. However, the Count became troubled because his wife only attended church infrequently, and always left in the middle of Mass. One day he had four of his men forcibly restrain his wife as she rose to leave the church. She evaded the men and, in full view of the congregation, flew out of the church through its highest window. She was Melusine, daughter of Satan. She carried her two youngest sons away with her. One of the remaining sons was the ancestor of the later Counts of Anjou, whose violent tempers were the result of their demonic background.

A similar story became attached to his mother Eleanor of Aquitaine, as seen in the 14th-century romance Richard Coer de Lyon. In this fantastical account, Henry II's wife is not named Eleanor but Cassodorien, and she always leaves Mass before the elevation of the Host. They have three children: Richard (presumably the later King Richard I, "The Lionheart"), John (presumably the later King John), and a daughter named Topyas. When Henry forces Cassodorien to stay in Mass, she flies through the roof of the church carrying her daughter, never to be seen again.

== Related legends ==
The Travels of Sir John Mandeville recounts a legend about Hippocrates' daughter. She was transformed into a hundred-foot-long dragon by the goddess Diane, and is the "lady of the manor" of an old castle. She emerges three times a year, and will be turned back into a woman if a knight kisses her, making the knight into her consort and ruler of the islands. Various knights try, but flee when they see the hideous dragon; they die soon thereafter. This appears to be an early version of the legend of Melusine.

The motif of the cursed serpent-maiden freed by a kiss (known as the fier baiser ("Proud/Fearsome Kiss")) also appears in the Arthurian romance entitled Le Bel Inconnu and the Northumbrian ballad of The Laidly Worm of Spindleston Heugh. This motif forms a variant, or subset, of the motif of the Loathly Lady disenchanted, (and thus returned to her comely form) by the action of a hero brave enough to approach her, despite her fearsomely ugly appearance.

== References in the arts and popular culture ==
=== Arts ===
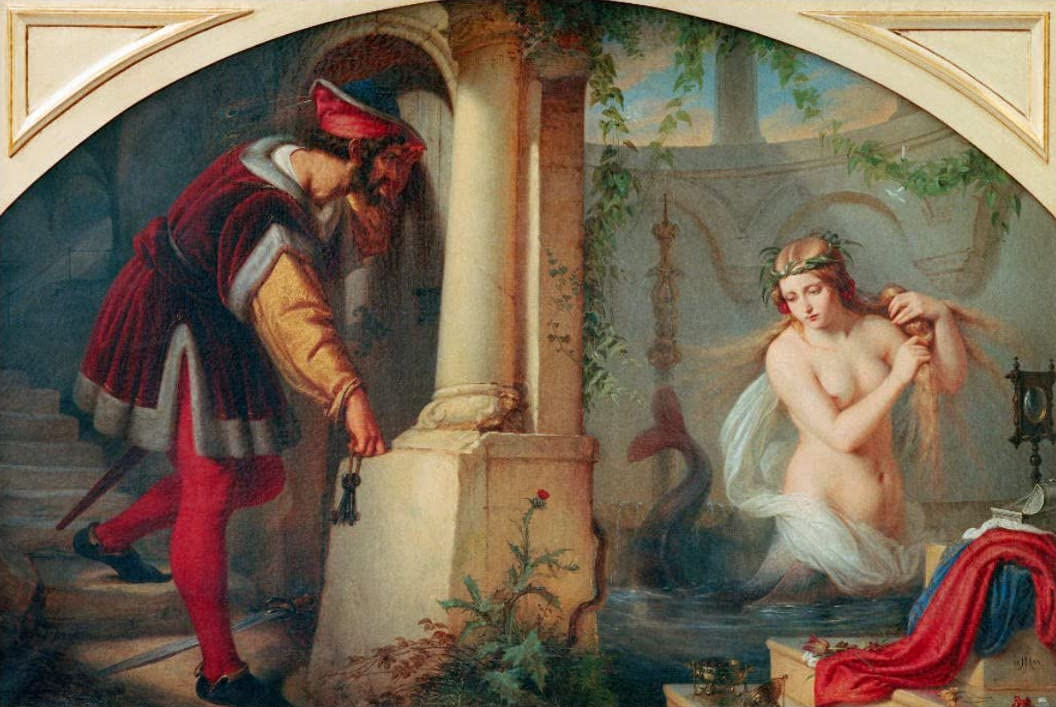
The Fair Melusine (1844) by Julius Hübner.

- Philip the Good's 1454 banquet, the Feast of the Pheasant, featured as one of the lavish 'entremets' (or table decorations) a mechanical depiction of Melusine as a dragon flying around the castle of Lusignan.
- Felix Mendelssohn wrote his concert overture The Fair Melusine in 1834 after seeing Conradin Kreutzer's opera Melusina the previous year.
- The story of Melusine (also called Melusina) was retold by Letitia Landon in the poem "The Fairy of the Fountains" in Fisher's Drawing Room Scrap Book and reprinted in her 1834 collection The Zenana. Here she is representative of the female poet. An analysis can be found in DeLong 2012, pp. 124–131.
- Marcel Proust's main character compares Gilberte to Melusine in Within a Budding Grove (1919). She is also compared on several occasions to the Duchesse de Guermantes who was (according to the Duc de Guermantes) directly descended from the Lusignan dynasty. In the Guermantes Way, for example, the narrator observes that the Lusignan family "was fated to become extinct on the day when the fairy Melusine should disappear".
- Margaret Irwin's fantasy novel These Mortals (1925) revolves around Melusine leaving her father's palace, and having adventures in the world of humans.
- Dorothy L. Sayers's short story The Leopard Lady in the 1939 collection In the Teeth of the Evidence features a Miss Smith "who should have been called Melusine".
- In Our Lady of the Flowers, Jean Genet twice says that Divine, the main character, is descended from "the siren Melusina".
- Maleficent, the villain of Disney's Sleeping Beauty (1959), is theorized by some scholars and historians to have been based on Mélusine, especially in the 2014 live-action film of the same name.
- The Wandering Unicorn is a 1965 fantasy novel by Manuel Mujica Lainez, based on the legend of Melusine, and narrated from her perspective.
- Rosemary Hawley Jarman used a reference from Sabine Baring-Gould's Curious Myths of the Middle Ages that the House of Luxembourg claimed descent from Melusine in her 1972 novel The King's Grey Mare, making Elizabeth Woodville's family claim descent from the water-spirit. This element is repeated in Philippa Gregory's novels The White Queen (2009) and The Lady of the Rivers (2011), but with Jacquetta of Luxembourg telling Elizabeth that their descent from Melusine comes through the Dukes of Burgundy.
- In A.S. Byatt's 1990 novel Possession, the fictional author Christabel LaMotte writes an epic poem titled "The Fairy Melusine."
- The main character Marie de France in Matrix (2021) by Lauren Groff is mentioned to be descended from “the fairy Melúsine.”

=== Popular culture ===
- In the series The White Queen (2013), Jacquetta of Luxembourg tells Elizabeth Woodville that they are descended from the river goddess Melusina, and that magic runs through their blood because of this lineage.
- The 2023 album Mélusine by Cécile McLorin Salvant uses songs to illustrate the tale.
- In the 2020 action role-playing game Genshin Impact, the Western European-inspired nation of Fontaine has a race of all-female humanoids known as Melusines, who were created from a gigantic monster named Elynas and are referred to as his 'daughters'.
- In the 2021 anime Tropical-Rouge! Pretty Cure, the mermaid queen, a major supporting character, is revealed to have the name of Melusine Muses Mnemosyne (メルジーヌ・ミューゼス・ムネモシュネ, Merujīnu Myūzesu Munemoshune).
- One of the songs in the Luxembourg Song Contest for 2026 Eurovision Song Contest was "Melusina" by Daryss.

== See also ==
- Echidna (mythology), Greek mythological serpent woman, mother of monsters
- Shahmaran, Benevolent serpent-woman from Anatolian and Iranian mythology
- Oronsen, Yoruba deity who hides her true nature from her mortal husband
- Legend of the White Snake
- Morgen (mythological creature)
- Nixie (folklore)
- Rusalka
- Naiad
- Potamides
- Partonopeus de Blois
- Urvashi
- Yuki-onna
- Knight of the Swan

== Literature ==
- Maddox, Donald; Sturm-Maddox, Sara (1996). Melusine of Lusignan: foundling fiction in late medieval France. University of Georgia Press. ISBN 9780820318233. Essays on the Roman de Mélusine (1393) of Jean d'Arras.
- Zeldenrust, Lydia (2020). The Mélusine Romance in Medieval Europe: Translation, Circulation, and Material Contexts. Cambridge: D.S. Brewer. ISBN 9781843845218. On the many translations of the romance, covering French, German, Dutch, Castilian, and English versions.
- d'Arras, Jean (1932). Stouff, Louis (ed.). Mélusine, roman du XIVe siècle (in French). Dijon: Bernigaud & Privat. A scholarly edition of the important medieval French version of the legend by Jean d'Arras.
- Eckert, Otto J. (1955). Luther and the Reformation (lecture).
- Proust, Marcel (1996) [1919]. Within A Budding Grove. Translated by Scott-Moncrieff, C. K. Random House UK. p. 190. ISBN 9780099362319.
- Letitia Elizabeth Landon, Fisher's Drawing Room Scrap Book, 1835 (1834). The Fairy of the Fountains.
- DeLong, Anne (2012). Mesmerism, Medusa and the Muse: The Romantic Discourse of Spontaneous Creativity. Lexington Books. ISBN 9780739170434.
