= Ondine =

Ondine may refer to:

== Literature ==
- Ondine (play), a play by Jean Giraudoux (1938)

- Undine (novella) by Friedrich de la Motte Fouqué (1811), basis of 1938 play

- Ondine, a poem by Aloysius Bertrand (1842)
- Ondine, a character in Tar Baby (1981), a novel by Toni Morrison
- Ondine (novel), a novel by Shannon Drake (1988)

== Art ==
- Ondine, a painting by John William Waterhouse (1849–1917)
- Ondine, a painting by David Wightman (2017/18)

== Music and ballet ==
- Ondine, a movement of the piano piece Gaspard de la nuit by Maurice Ravel (1906)
- Ondine, ou La naïade, a ballet with music by Cesare Pugni and choreography by Jules Perrot, first produced in 1843
- Ondine (ballet), a ballet with music by Hans Werner Henze and choreography by Frederick Ashton, first produced in 1958 for the Royal Ballet
- Ondine, a prelude for piano by Debussy (1912)
- "Ondine", a song by They Might Be Giants, from the EP Back to Skull
- "Ondine", a song by Echobelly, from the album People Are Expensive
- Ondine (record label), a classical record label
- Ondine, a song by Lower Dens from their 2015's album Escape from Evil

== Film ==
- Ondine (film), a 2009 film by Irish film maker Neil Jordan
- The Loves of Ondine, a film by Andy Warhol

== Other uses ==
- Ondine, alternative name for "undine", the category of elemental beings associated with water
- Ondine (actor), also known as Robert Olivo (1937–1989), American actor
- C. Ondine Chavoya (born 1970), American art historian, author, curator, professor
- Ondine Achampong, British artistic gymnast
- Ondine (typeface), a typeface designed by Adrian Frutiger
- French submarine Ondine, the name of more than one submarine of the French Navy

== See also ==
- Undina (disambiguation)
- Undine (disambiguation)
- Ondine's curse, a medical condition
