= Undine (Lortzing) =

Opera in four acts by Albert Lortzing

- Opera by Albert Lortzing
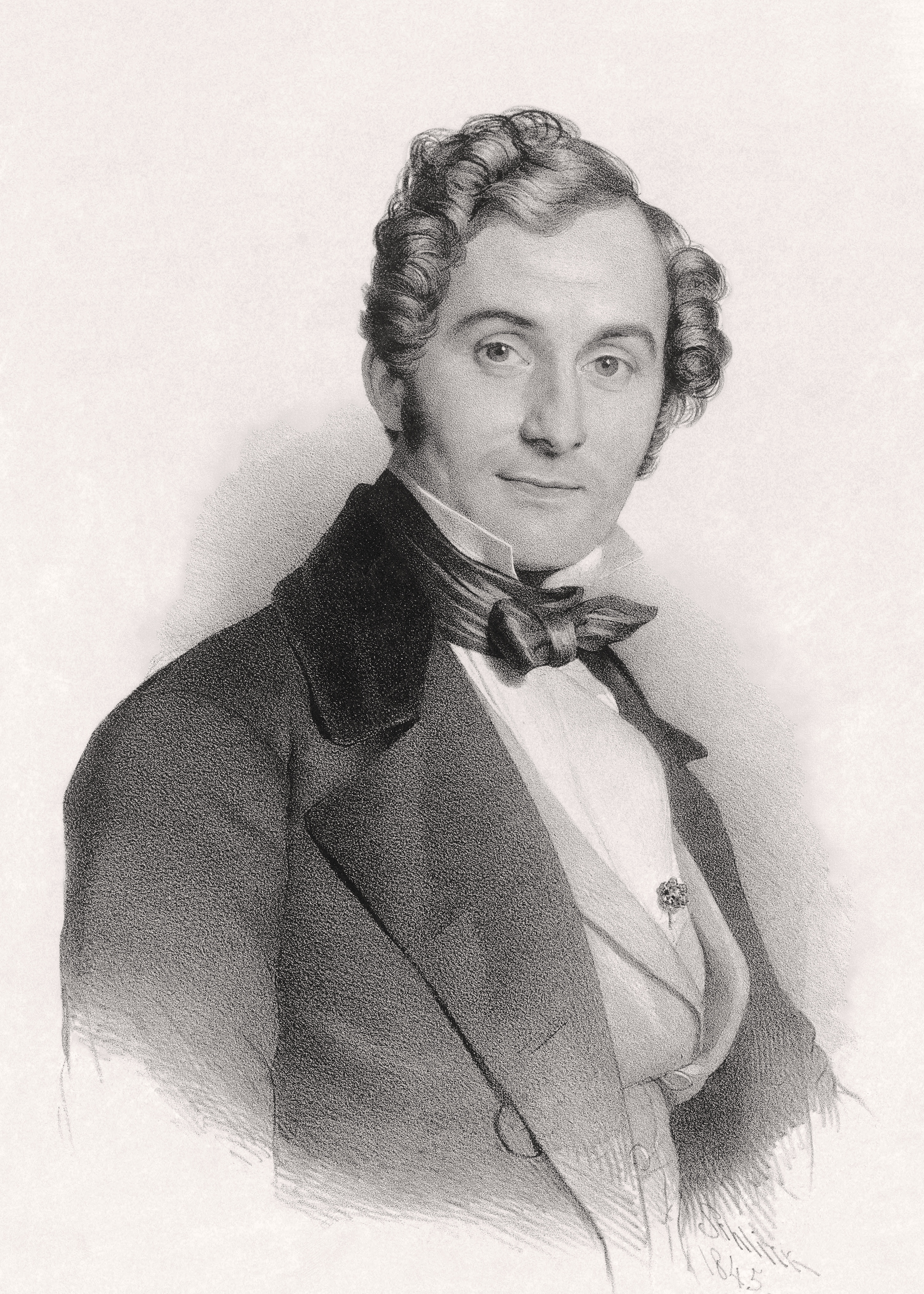
- The composer in 1845
- Librettist: Lortzing
- Language: German
- Based on: Undine by Friedrich de la Motte Fouqué
- Premiere: 21 April 1845; Stadttheater Magdeburg

Undine is an opera in four acts by Albert Lortzing. The German libretto was by the composer after Friedrich de la Motte Fouqué's novella of the same name.

There had been a revival of interest in Fouqué following the writer's death in 1843 to which Lortzing responded. Unlike Lortzing's earlier comedies, this work is a serious one, described as a romantische Zauberoper ('romantic magic opera').

A number of other operas and ballets have been based on Fouqué's version of the myth of the water spirit Undine, including Tchaikovsky's Undina, E. T. A. Hoffmann's Undine, Cesare Pugni's Ondine, ou La naïade and Hans Werner Henze's Ondine.

== Performance history ==
The opera was first performed at the Stadttheater Magdeburg on 21 April 1845.

== Roles ==
Roles, voice types, premiere cast
Role	Voice type	Premiere cast, 21 April 1845
Bertalda, presumed daughter of Duke Heinrich	dramatic coloratura soprano	Beer
Hans, a cellarer	bass	
Hugo von Ringstetten	tenor	Nissen
Kühleborn, prince of the water spirits	baritone	Werlitz
Marthe	contralto	Detroit
Pater Heilmann	bass	
Tobias, a fisherman	bass	
Undine, Tobias's adopted daughter	soprano	Marie Minna Kiel
Veit, Ringstetten's squire	tenor	Quint

== Synopsis ==
=== Act 1 ===
The knight Hugo von Ringstetten, having won a tournament, has been given a quest by Bertalda, the daughter of the Duke. She wants him to explore the enchanted forest. Hugo and his squire Veit have been forced by bad weather and floods to take refuge in a fishing village, and have been living there for some months. Hugo has fallen in love with the beautiful Undine, the foster daughter of the fisherman Tobias and his wife Marthe, and plans to marry her. He tells his bride of his previous life and that he had once loved Bertalda, but now has forgotten her. They are astonished at Undine's remark that she has no soul.

As farmers and fishermen follow the knight and Undine into the Chapel, Kühleborn, the Prince of the water spirits, suddenly appears, disguised as a farmer, and talks to Veit. He remarks that this Undine is probably only a creation of his Lord and will not be permanent. Kühleborn had once kidnapped the real daughter of the fishermen, Bertalda, and entrusted her to the Duke. Undine was left for Tobias and Marthe to raise instead. He wanted to test whether the people who have a soul, are better off than the soulless spirits that live in the waters. He decides to watch over Undine and accompanies the young couple and Veit to the imperial capital, disguised as a priest.

=== Act 2 ===
The winemaker Hans is happy to welcome back his drinking friend Veit, who tells him about his adventures, and that he has married Undine, a mermaid without a soul. Bertalda learns that Hugo is married, and her love turns to hate. Kühleborn joins the celebration disguised as a count from Naples. As she reviles Undine because of her lowly origin, Kühleborn claims that Bertalda is actually the child of fisher people, who she contemptuously rejects. To prove that she is of noble blood, she displays a box belonging to her father the Duke. But a letter inside the box attests Kühleborn's claim. Horrified Bertalda collapses. Kühleborn declares that he is the Prince of the water and disappears before their eyes into the waters of the fountain in the Hall.

=== Act 3 ===
Bertalda seduces Hugo. Hugo tells Undine that he will no longer live with a water goblin. Undine warns him of Kühleborn's revenge and anger, but he determines to make Bertalda his wife anyway. Kühleborn brings Undine back into the water depths. He explains that beings with a soul are no better than the spirits without them.

=== Act 4 ===
Hugo cannot forget Undine and his bad dreams haunt him. Veit and Hans, who has entered into Hugo's service, celebrate the wedding of their Lord with Bertalda, which will take place that day. Intoxicated, they remove the stones blocking the castle fountain. Slowly arising from the water in a white mask, Undine goes weeping into the castle. During the marriage celebration in the castle hall, Hugo, in vain, seeks to dispel ill forebodings. At midnight, the lights go out. Undine appears, surrounded by a mysterious blue light. Hugo throws himself at her feet. A flood of water destroys the castle. The palace of Kühleborn appears with Undine and Hugo kneeling before him. Hugo is forgiven but must remain forever in the realm of the water spirits.

== Recordings ==
- 1951: Trude Eipperle (Undine), Christa Ludwig (Bertalda), Else Tegetthoff (Marthe), Karl Friedrich (Hugo), Ferdinand Frantz (Kühleborn), Willy Hofmann (Veit), Frithjof Sentpaul (Tobias), Aage Poulsen (Pater Heilmann), Sanders Schier (Hans); Choir and Frankfurt Radio Symphony, Carl-Alexander Häfner, Cantus-Lin
- 1966: Anneliese Rothenberger (Undine), Ruth-Margret Pütz (Bertalda), Nicolai Gedda (Hugo), Peter Schreier (Veit), Hermann Prey (Kühleborn), Gottlob Frick (Hans/Pater Heilmann), Sieglinde Wagner (Marthe), Hans Günther Grimm (Tobias); Radio-Symphonie-Orchester Berlin conducted by Robert Heger, EMI Classics
