= Die schöne Melusine =

Concert overture by Felix Mendelssohn

- Overture by Felix Mendelssohn
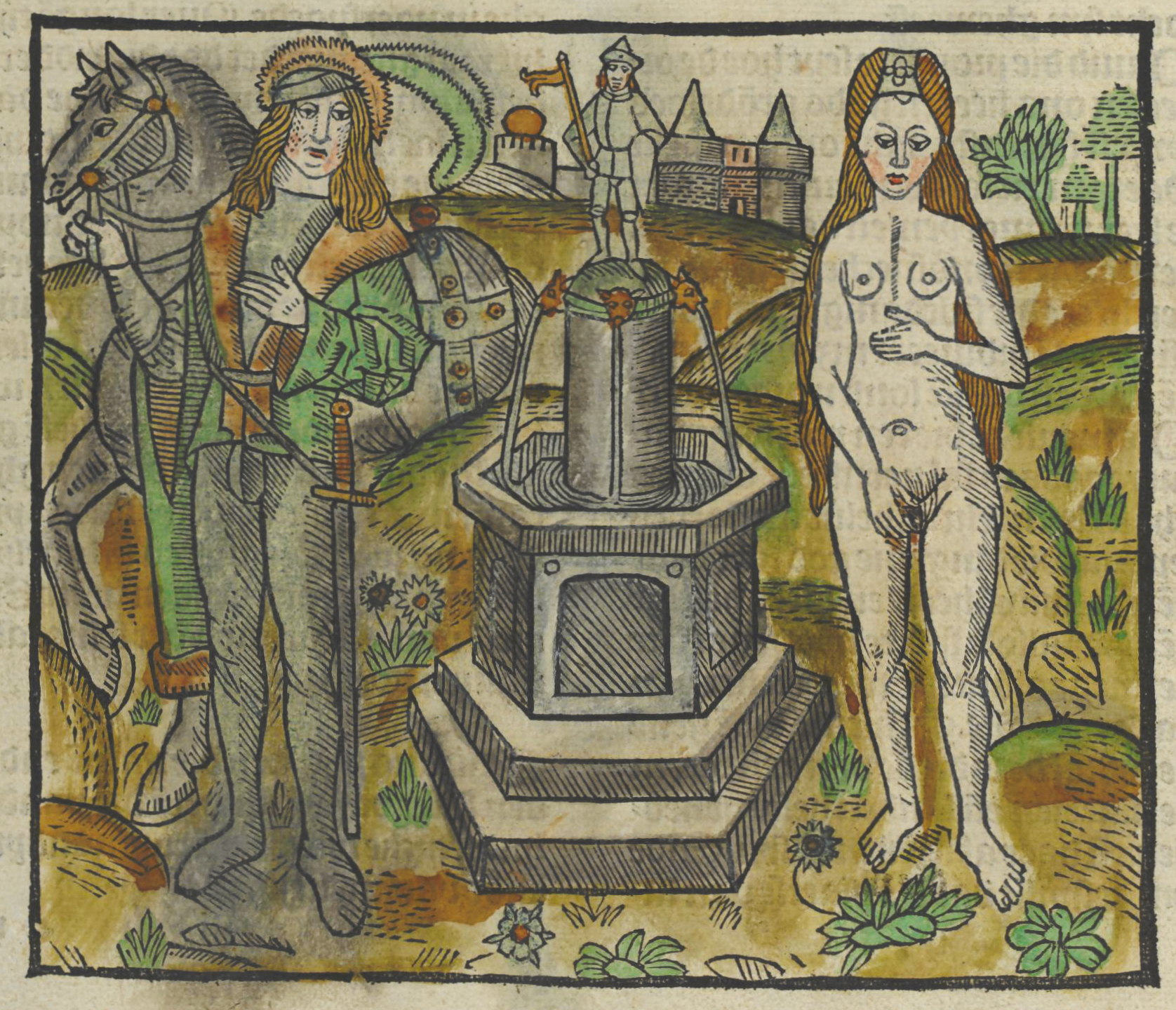
- From a version of the Legend of Melusine, printed in Antwerp in 1491
- Opus: 32
- Based on: Legend of Melusine
- Composed: 1834

Ouvertüre zum Märchen von der schönen Melusine, Op. 32, (German: Overture to the Legend of the Fair Melusine) is a concert overture by Felix Mendelssohn written in 1834. It is generally referred to as Die schöne Melusine in modern concert programming and recordings, and is sometimes rendered in English as The Fair Melusine and The Fair Melusina.

== Inspiration ==
The overture is loosely illustrative of aspects of the legend of Melusine, a water-nymph who marries Count Raymond, on the condition that he never enter her room on a Saturday (on which day she takes on the form of a mermaid). In the 19th century, the story was familiar in Germany in the retelling by Ludwig Tieck (Melusina, 1800) and the poetic version of Friedrich de la Motte Fouqué (his Undine of 1811). Mendelssohn denied close musical references to the story which critics, including Robert Schumann, believed they detected. When asked what the piece was about, Mendelssohn replied drily "Hmm ... a misalliance". Nevertheless, some aspects of the music have clear pictorial implications. The opening passage of string instrument arpeggios in 6/4 rhythm anticipates the river music of the opening of Richard Wagner's 1854 opera Das Rheingold.

== Composition ==
The piece was written in 1834 as a birthday gift for Mendelssohn's sister Fanny. In a letter to her of 7 April 1834, he explains that he had picked on the subject after seeing Conradin Kreutzer's opera Melusina the previous year in Berlin. Kreutzer's overture, writes Mendelssohn "was encored, and I disliked it exceedingly, and the whole opera quite as much: but not [the singer] Mlle. Hähnel, who was very fascinating, especially in one scene when she appeared as a mermaid combing her hair; this inspired me with the wish to write an overture which the people might not encore, but which would cause them more solid pleasure."

== First performance and revision ==
The overture, which is broadly in sonata form, was first performed in London by the Philharmonic Society orchestra, conducted by Ignaz Moscheles, under the title Melusine, or the Mermaid and the Knight. The performance was received politely but not enthusiastically. Mendelssohn subsequently revised the piece, and it was published in the revised form in 1836. A German contemporary reviewer commented that the Overture "does not try to translate the whole tale into musical language ... but only to conjure up for us, from the dreamworld of harmonic power, the happiness and unhappiness of two beings."
