= Jessica Mezey =

American prima ballerina

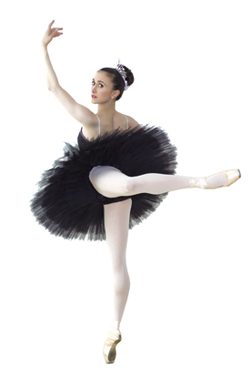
Jessica Mezey

Jessica Mezey is an American prima ballerina.

== Career ==
She began her ballet training in upstate New York, continuing in Arizona, New York City, and finally at the famous Vaganova Academy of Russian Ballet in St. Petersburg, Russia, where she received her diploma. She has danced the entire classical repertoire, as well as neoclassic and diverse modern styles.

Mezey has danced leading roles in many national theaters, including the leading part of Medora of the Adolphe Adam ballet Le Corsaire at the Slovak National Theatre. The following ballets were choreographed for her at the Volkstheater Rostock (Germany) from 2005 to 2009: The Nutcracker, Cinderella (by Sergei Prokofiev), Romeo and Juliet, Swan Lake, and Undine by Hans Werner Henze.

Mezey also writes concepts for fashion shows, events, and theater productions. She has created and directed two original theater productions in Gut Klöstermühle, Alt Madlitz (Germany).
