= Undina (disambiguation) =

Undina is an alternative name for Undine, a category of elemental beings associated with water.

Undina may also refer to:

== Music ==
- Undina, an opera by Alexei Lvov (1846)
- Undina (Tchaikovsky), an opera (1869) by Pyotr Tchaikovsky to the Russian libretto by Vladimir Sollogub
- Undina, a juvenile opera by Prokofiev

== Science ==
- Undina (fish), a genus of prehistoric lobe-finned fish
- 92 Undina, an asteroid

== See also ==
- Ondine (disambiguation)
- Undine (disambiguation)
