= Potamides =

Potamides may refer to:

- Potameides or potamides, nymphs of rivers in Greek mythology
- Potamides (gastropod), a genus of prehistoric molluscs in the family Potamididae
