= Sonata Undine =

Composition by Carl Reinecke

- Sonata by Carl Reinecke
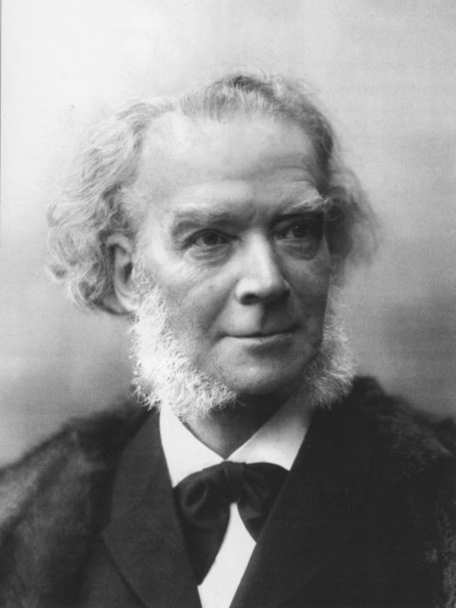
- Reinecke in c. 1890
- Opus: 167
- Published: 1882

Sonata Undine in E minor is a flute and piano sonata written by Carl Reinecke, consisting of four movements, that is based on the novel Undine by Friedrich de la Motte Fouqué. It is his opus 167, first published in 1882.

The four movements are as follows:

1. Allegro
2. Intermezzo. Allegretto vivace
3. Andante tranquillo
4. Finale. Allegro molto agitato ed appassionato, quasi Presto.

== See also ==
- Ondine (mythology)
- Gaspard de la nuit
