= Peter von Staufenberg =

Peter von Staufenberg is a Middle High German verse novella in 1,192 lines. It was written around 1310 by Egenolf von Staufenberg.

Egenolf was a member of an Alsatian noble family. Egenolf can be traced in documents from 1273, 1285 and 1320. He was dead by 1324. The prototype for the hero of his novella was probably a relative of his, the Peter von Staufenberg who is mentioned in documents of 1274 and 1287. Their name came from the castle of Staufenberg near Durbach in the Ortenau. In the poem, Peter is said to have become a knight at the Holy Sepulchre, perhaps in reference to the historical Peter's participation in the Crusade of 1267, where some are known to have been knighted there.

The hero of the story is Peter Diemringer, a virtuous knight of Staufenberg castle. He meets a beautiful woman with the supernatural ability to appear and disappear at will. He moves in with her, receiving sexual and material rewards on the condition that he marry no one else. If he does, he will die three days after the wedding. His family insists that he marry a niece of the Emperor and the clergy conclude that his lover is an emissary of Satan. He eventually gives in to social pressure to marry, but on his wedding day a woman's leg thrusts itself through the ceiling of the church and shoots out a bolt of lightning. Nevertheless, Peter is given three days as promised to prepare piously for his death.

Thematically, Peter von Staufenberg may be classed as a variation of the legend of Melusine or as belonging to the Knight of the Swan tradition. In terms of values and style, it belongs to the courtly tradition. It is also a moralizing tale in the genre of the mirror of princes, possessing a clear message to young men of Egenolf's social class: a rash promise in the pursuit of sexual pleasure ends tragically through female vindictiveness.

Peter von Staufenberg draws on Celtic folklore mediated through works in Old French. It shares themes and folkloric motifs with the anonymous lay Guingamor, Marie de France's Guigemer and the anonymous Roman de Dolopathos. In German literature, it is part of the same tradition as Konrad von Würzburg's Partonopier und Meliur and Gottfried von Strassburg's Tristan.

In 1588, an adaptation of Peter von Staufenberg by Bernhard Schmidt was published with an introduction by Johann Fischart.

== Sources ==
- Bleck, Reinhard (1987). "Ein oberrheinischer Palästina-Kreuzzug 1267". Basler Zeitschrift für Geschichte und Altertumskunde. 87: 5–27.
- Garland, Henry; Garland, Mary, eds. (2005) [1997]. "Peter von Staufenberg". The Oxford Companion to German Literature (3rd ed.). Oxford University Press.
- Walker, Richard Ernest (1980). Peter von Staufenberg: Its Origins, Development, and Later Adaptation. Göppingen: Kümerle.
- Walker, Richard Ernest (2001). "Peter von Staufenberg". In John M. Jeep (ed.). Medieval Germany: An Encyclopedia. Garland. pp. 616–617.
