= Lila De Nobili =

Italian designer and illustrator (1916–2002)

Lila De Nobili (September 3, 1916 – February 19, 2002) was an Italian stage designer, costume designer, and fashion illustrator. She was noted for her collaborations with leading stage and opera directors such as Luchino Visconti and Franco Zeffirelli, as well as her early work on fashion illustration at French Vogue magazine.

== Personal ==
Lila De Nobili was born in Castagnola (Lugano). Her father was the Marquis Prospero de Nobili from an aristocratic Ligurian and Tuscan family and her mother, Dola Berta Vertès, was from a Jewish Hungarian family. Her uncle was the painter and Academy Award-winning costume designer Marcel Vertès, who painted Lila as a child.

In the 1930s, she studied with the artist Ferruccio Ferrazzi at the Academy of Fine Arts in Rome. One of her own pupils was the costume designer and director, Christine Edzard, with whom she had a lifelong friendship and collaboration.

She settled in Paris in 1943, and this would be her home for most of her life on the rue de Verneuil and on the Quai Voltaire, where she lived until her death in 2002, aged 85. Franco Zeffirelli said: "She was the greatest scene and costume designer of the 20th century, the teacher of us all. Every time I design an opera I think of her." Her portrait by David Hockney in oil pastel in 1973 is sometimes mis-titled as 'Lila Nobilis'.

== Illustration ==
In Paris from 1943, De Nobili began doing illustrations of the haute couture collections for various magazines, especially French Vogue. She also did illustrations for Hermès and created adverts for fragrances by Lucien Lelong and she created publicity drawings for Elsa Schiaparelli, Lanvin, Pierre Balmain and Marcel Rochas.

== Opera and Ballet Design in France and Italy ==
She created costumes for Rouleau's works including Angel Pavement (1947), Le voleur d'enfants (1948), A Streetcar Named Desire (1949), La Petite Lili (1951), Anna Karenine (1951), Gigi (1951), Cyrano de Bergerac (1953), The Country Girl (1954), The Crucible (1954), La Plume de Ma Tante (1958), L'Arlésienne (1958), Carmen (1959) and The Aspern Papers (1961).

For the French premiere of A Streetcar Named Desire, adapted by Jean Cocteau and starring Arletty as Blanche DuBois, Lila de Nobili designed a hot and sleazy New Orleans.

She went on to work with composers and directors such as Giancarlo Menotti and Luchino Visconti on ballets, operas and plays. With Visconti at the La Scala opera house in Milan, she designed sets and costumes for his definitive La Traviata (1955), including Maria Callas's costume for Violetta which is still said to influence costume designers today.

De Nobili's opera, ballet and film designs in the late 1950s and early '60s include Jean Babilée's Sable (1956), Franco Zeffirelli's Mignon (1957), and Orphée (1958). She designed sets and costumes for Raymond Rousseau's Ruy Blas (1960), Menotti's La Bohème (1960), Zeffirelli's Falstaff (1961), Aida (1962) and Rigoletto (1963) and Jean Babilee's Le Roi des Gourmets (1964).

== Theatre, Opera and Ballet Design in Britain ==
In the late 1950s she began working at Stratford upon Avon in the UK with Peter Hall. She was introduced to Hall by his then wife, Leslie Caron. De Nobili designed seven Shakespeare comedies and late plays for Hall at the Royal Shakespeare Company at Stratford-upon-Avon and the Aldwych Theatre, London, in the late 1950s and 1960s. They included Cymbeline with Peggy Ashcroft (1957) Twelfth Night (1958) with Geraldine McEwan and Dorothy Tutin, and A Midsummer Night's Dream (1958) with Charles Laughton, Vanessa Redgrave and Diana Rigg. In October 1965 De Nobili designed sets and costumes for a National Theatre production (then still at The Old Vic) of William Congreve's Love for Love, directed by Peter Wood and starring Laurence Olivier and Geraldine McEwan. She designed many ballets and operas at The Royal Opera House at Covent Garden, including The Sleeping Beauty (1968) in collaboration with Rostislav Doboujinsky, and created sets and costumes for Frederick Ashton's Ondine (1958).

== Film ==
De Nobili designed the costumes, in collaboration with Rostislav Doboujinsky, for Raymond Rousseau's film Les Sorcières de Salem (1957) (from The Crucible by Arthur Miller) with screenplay by Jean-Paul Sartre and starring Simone Signoret, and for Michel Boisrond's Amours Célèbres (or Famous Love Affairs, 1961) also with Simone Signoret, Brigitte Bardot and Alain Delon, co-designing the costumes with Monique Dunan and Georges Wakhevitch). She was also colour and period consultant on The Charge of the Light Brigade (1968) directed by Tony Richardson.
