= Crusade of 1267 =

13th-century crusade

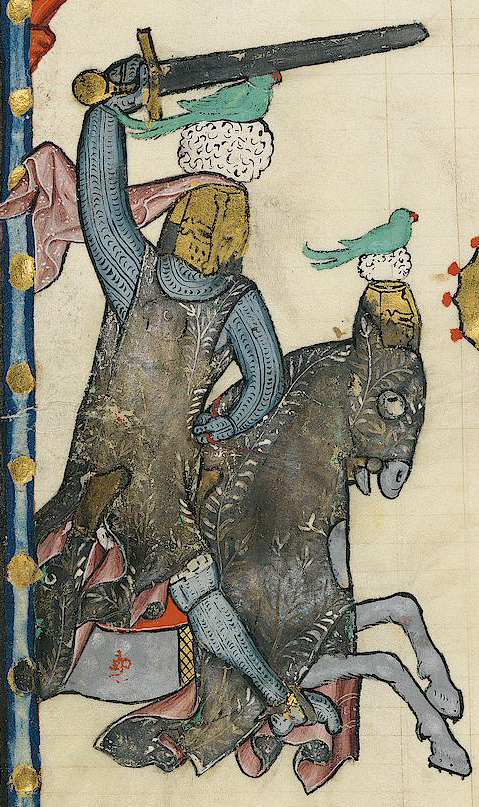
A knight of the Psitticher faction of Basel, from the Codex Manesse (early 14th century). Both of the leaders of the Crusade of 1267 (Mönch and Schaler) were Psittichers.

The Crusade of 1267 was a military expedition from the Upper Rhenish regions of the Holy Roman Empire for the defence of the Kingdom of Jerusalem. It was one of several minor crusades of the 1260s that resulted from a period of Papally-sponsored crusade preaching of unprecedented intensity. The only major campaign to come of it was the Eighth Crusade in 1270.

Something is known of the preaching and organization of the crusade, but nothing for certain of its results. Several hundred crusaders and pilgrims did reach the Kingdom of Jerusalem under the leadership of two ministerials, but they probably waited in vain for the arrival of the Eighth Crusade without undertaking major military actions. Most of the crusaders of 1267 returned home before the Eighth Crusade even set out.

The main source for the Crusade of 1267 is the Bassler Chronick of Christian Wurstisen, which appeared in 1580. Although a late source with a confused chronology, Wurstisen is generally reliable and his chronology can be corrected by other sources.

== Preaching and recruitment ==
In response to the recent attacks of the Egyptian sultan Baibars against the Kingdom of Jerusalem, which had resulted in the loss of Arsuf and of Caesarea, Pope Clement IV issued the bull Expansis in cruce authorising a formal crusade in August 1265. It was sent to France, Germany and Scandinavia. The preaching of the new crusade was entrusted to the German bishops and to the Dominican and Franciscan friars in January 1266. According to the Chronica minor auctore Minorita Erphordiensi:

In the year of our Lord 1266, Pope Clement sent out letters throughout the kingdom of Germany commanding the Dominicans and Franciscans to preach the cross faithfully and urgently against the Sultan of Babylon, who is the Pharaoh of Egypt, and against the Saracens overseas, so that the suffering of the Christians [there] might be alleviated and for the support of the Holy Land.

Recruitment was poor except in Alsace, the Sundgau and Basel. There preaching was conducted by Achilles, former head of the Dominican priory in Basel. He recruited an army of more than 500 that gathered in Basel in early 1267.

Out of the same kingdom-wide preaching campaign and Papal bull, several leading noblemen of the Empire opted to crusade against Prussia instead of in the Holy Land. These included King Ottokar II of Bohemia, Duke Albert I of Brunswick, Margrave Henry III of Meissen and Margrave Otto III of Brandenburg. The Chronica minor also reports that many of those recruited in Germany in 1266 were pressed into serving Count Charles I of Anjou in his conquest of the Kingdom of Sicily, which had Papal sanction as a crusade against the pope's main rivals in Italy, the German Staufer dynasty.

A line from the Annales Basileenses manuscript: "The knights of the Schaler and Mönch held a court [tournament] in Basel this [year]" (Scalarii et Monachi milites curiam habuerunt Basilee hic). This tournament was most likely connected with the crusade.

The crusaders that gathered at Basel were placed under the leadership of two knights, Sigfrid Mönch and Hemman (Johannes) Schaler, who were ministerials of the bishopric of Basel. The crusade lacked a noble leader, since ministerials were legally serfs.

According to the Annales Basileenses, the Mönch and Schaler families held a "court" in Basel in 1266. This is most likely the annual tournament held on 8 September by the Psitticher (Parrots), one of the municipal factions in Basel to which both the Mönch and Schaler families belonged. The famous poet Konrad von Würzburg, who was living in Basel and an associate of the Psitticher at the time, may even have composed his poem Der Welt Lohn as a piece of crusade propaganda for the occasion. One other known crusade song may have been composed on the occasion of the Crusade of 1267: Hilf, herre, den die dîner muoter nîgen! by Hawart.

== Expedition ==
The Rhenish crusaders were probably only permitted to go to the Holy Land because of the death of King Manfred of Sicily, Charles of Anjou's rival, the previous year. They left Basel during Lent (2 March–10 April) and travelled overland to Genoa, where they would have arrived in late April or early May. There they reportedly met a Mongol delegation returning from a mission to Aragon and travelled with it to Acre. This was probably not the same embassy that returned to Mongolia with a Papal ambassador, Jayme Alaric, since that group must only have departed after 20 August, too late for the crusading army that arrived in the spring. A Genoese war fleet of 25 ships under Luchetto Grimaldi is known to have left Genoa in late June and arrived in Acre, the capital of the Kingdom of Jerusalem, on 16 August. This, a fleet equipped for war against Venice, is probably the fleet that carried the Rhenish crusaders.

Of the actions of this small crusade in the Holy Land little is known. Several crusaders managed to complete their pilgrimage to the Church of the Holy Sepulchre in Muslim territory, where some of them were knighted. It is likely that the army avoided any military confrontations with the Baibars' forces in anticipation of the arrival of the armies of the Eighth Crusade. The army of King Louis IX of France (who took the cross in March 1267) did not go to the Holy Land in any case, instead attacking Tunis in 1270. Likewise, the Lord Edward's crusade did not arrive in Acre until 1271. They could have taken part in the defence of Antioch, which fell to Baibars on 18 May 1268. Most of the Upper Rhenish crusaders returned home in the period 1269–1270.

A literary echo of the Crusade of 1267 may be found in the novella Peter von Staufenberg, written in 1310 by Egenolf von Staufenberg. Although the novella is completely fictional, the prototype for the title character is the historical Peter von Staufenberg, who is documented in 1274 and 1287. It is probable that the novella's story of the knighting of Peter at the Holy Sepulchre was based on the real Peter's participation in the Crusade of 1267.

== Sources ==
- Bleck, Reinhard (1987). "Ein oberrheinischer Palästina-Kreuzzug 1267". Basler Zeitschrift für Geschichte und Altertumskunde. 87: 5–27.
- Jaffé, Philipp, ed. (1861). "Annales Basileenses". Monumenta Germaniae Historica, Scriptores. Vol. 17. pp. 193–202.
- Maier, Christoph T. (1994). Preaching the Crusades: Mendicant Friars and the Cross in the Thirteenth Century. Cambridge University Press.
- Morton, Nicholas (2011). "In subsidium: The Declining Contribution of Germany and Eastern Europe to the Crusades to the Holy Land, 1221–91". German Historical Institute London Bulletin. 33 (1): 38–66.
- Murray, Alan V. (2006). "Crusade of 1267". In Alan V. Murray (ed.). The Crusades: An Encyclopedia. Vol. 4 vols. ABC-CLIO. vol. 1, p. 311.
