= Ondine (ballet) =

1958 ballet by Frederick Ashton and Hans Werner Henze

- Sarah Wildor in a poster for the 2000 staging of Ondine by The Royal Ballet
- Choreographer: Sir Frederick Ashton
- Music: Hans Werner Henze
- Based on: Friedrich de la Motte Fouqué's novella Undine
- Premiere: 27 October 1958; Royal Opera House, London
- Original ballet company: The Royal Ballet
- Characters: Ondine (Undine); Palemon; Tirrenio, Lord of the Mediterranean Sea; Berta (Beatrice); Hermit
- Setting: Mediterranean
- Created for: Dame Margot Fonteyn
- Genre: Neoclassical ballet
- Type: Classical ballet

Ondine is a ballet in three acts created by the choreographer Sir Frederick Ashton and composer Hans Werner Henze. Ashton originally produced Ondine for the Royal Ballet in 1958, with Henze commissioned to produce the original score, published as Undine, which has since been restaged by other choreographers. The ballet was adapted from a novella titled Undine by Friedrich de la Motte Fouqué and it tells the tale of a water nymph who is the object of desire of a young prince named Palemon. The première of the ballet took place at the Royal Opera House, London, on 27 October 1958, with the composer as guest conductor. The first major revival of this Ashton/Henze production took place in 1988.

== History ==
The three-act ballet of Ondine was commissioned and produced for The Royal Ballet in 1958 by the choreographer Sir Frederick Ashton. The resulting ballet was a collaboration between Ashton and the German composer Hans Werner Henze, who was commissioned to write the score. It is the only full length ballet that Ashton choreographed to original music, and the score is regarded as a rarity by musicians, as it is a "20th century full-length ballet score that has the depth of a masterwork".

The ballet was originally intended as a vehicle for The Royal Ballet's then prima ballerina, Margot Fonteyn and the title role of Ondine was choreographed specially for her and led one critic to describe the ballet as "a concerto for Fonteyn". From its première in 1958 until the work was removed from the repertoire in 1966, nearly every performance of Ondine saw Fonteyn cast in the lead role, with the only occasional exceptions seeing Nadia Nerina and Svetlana Beriosova dancing the role. Maria Almeida became the first ballerina to dance the role of Ondine in a revival, with Anthony Dowell dancing the role of Palemon. Staged in 1988 and conducted by Isaiah Jackson, the revival was a success and the ballet has been regularly performed ever since.

=== Music ===
Ashton initially approached Sir William Walton to compose the score for Ondine. They had worked together before on a ballet called The Quest for the Sadler's Wells company in 1943, and agreed to collaborate again for the 1955–56 season; they decided on Macbeth as their subject. Fonteyn, however, was firmly opposed to playing Lady Macbeth, and was not enthused by Ashton's next suggestion, Miranda in a ballet of The Tempest. By the time Ashton had lighted on Ondine as an alternative, Walton was immersed in work on a concerto. He suggested that his friend Henze be approached. Accordingly, the music was commissioned from Henze, who titled the score Undine.

Henze and Ashton met at the former's home on the island of Ischia, just across the bay from Naples, to decide their key approaches to this new ballet. They decided to ignore the northern origins of Fouqué's novella Undine and move it to the Mediterranean. Ashton and Henze chose Lila De Nobili to design the set and costumes. She was described by Henze as "an Italian bewitched by English landscape and culture", however her first intention was to make the sets in the style that might have been seen on the stage of La Scala a hundred years earlier. However, Henze and Ashton had decided not to make their ballet a mix of all the great works of the nineteenth century, but rather that it would be the product of their own contemporary sensibilities with references to other works. Eventually, the three of them decided that Ondine would have a "gothic-revival" setting.

Despite his experience in the ballet world, Henze had never before composed a subject in the romantic style which Ashton requested, however Ashton had been impressed by Henze's treatment of magical material in his opera König Hirsch. Henze attended many ballet performances at Covent Garden, frequently accompanied by Ashton who told him clearly what he liked and what he did not like in music for dance. Eventually the work was completed, but when Ashton heard a recording of the orchestrated score he realised that he would have to revise his ideas; the sustained orchestral sounds were such a contrast to the piano score and made him think very differently.

Henze later arranged the Wedding Music for wind orchestra in 1957 and a further two orchestral suites in 1958.

== Critical reception ==
After its première in 1958 it was greeted with mixed, half-hearted reviews, although the first night reviews of Ondine were unanimous about one thing: Fonteyn's triumph in the title role. A.V.Coton spoke of "the supernormal sensitivity of feeling, interaction and mutual understanding which exists between Ashton and his heroine", and Cyril W. Beaumont saw the ballet as Ashton's "greatest gift" to his ballerina. Nothing else about the piece pleased everybody, though most reviewers liked Lila De Nobili's designs and praised the contribution of the supporting cast – Beaumont called Alexander Grant's Tirrenio "of Miltonic stature, magnificently danced and mimed". Edwin Denby dismissed Ondine: after praising Fonteyn he said "But the ballet is foolish, and everyone noticed". Most critics disliked the music and Mary Clarke was in the minority when she called it "rich and romantic and superbly rhythmical". Fernau Hall thought Henze showed "little understanding of the needs of classical dancing", and that Ondine would establish itself firmly in the repertoire "if it were not for Henze's music".

In 1958 the ballet was widely seen as having choreography and décor in harmony with each other but fighting with the music; now it's the choreography and the music which seem to speak the same language, while the sets look not only backward but to the north. Even when it was revived in 1988, it was hailed neither as a disaster nor as a lost masterpiece. Henze's modern music is also perceived as a reason for the few performances of this ballet before its revival in the 1990s.

== Synopsis ==
Ondine bears a resemblance to The Little Mermaid. The story derives from Fouqué's novella Undine, the tale of a water-nymph who marries a mortal. Similar to other 19th century fairy tales, the plot is based on man (Palemon) encountering the supernatural (the water nymph Ondine), but the outcome is rather different from many of the 19th century classics: here, it is the man that dies, and the female character survives. Ondine makes her first entrance from a fountain, shivering in the cold air as we would in water, and dances with her shadow, which she has never seen before. She meets the hero, Palemon, and is astonished when she feels his heartbeat as she doesn't possess a heart. Palemon deserts Berta, whom he has been courting, and decides to marry Ondine. During a particularly strong storm while at sea, Ondine is lost overboard. Palemon survives the shipwreck created by the angry Ondines and, believing Ondine is lost, ends up marrying Berta. Ondine returns, however, and is heartbroken when she discovers Palemon's unfaithfulness. When she kisses him, he dies and she brings his body back into the sea with her forever.

In the published score, as with the title of the ballet, Henze also retained the original spellings of the character names. The London ballet production was given as Ondine, but the score was titled Undine, and names the lead character as Undine. Henze also uses the original name Beatrice rather than Berta.

=== Principal characters ===
Ondine (Undine)

The title role is undoubtedly the main focus of the ballet. She is a gentle water sprite who the audience discovers dancing in a waterfall and then with her own shadow. Her love for Palemon is deep, which is what makes his unfaithfulness so devastating and dramatic.

Palemon

The male lead is bewitched by the feminine allure of Ondine. He has never seen a creature as lovely as her and decides to marry Ondine, forsaking his betrothed, Beatrice (Berta). Similar to the Prince in Swan Lake, Palemon is destroyed by breaking the trust of his intended.

Berta (Beatrice)

She is the perfect female contrast to Ondine. Ondine belongs to the sea, whereas Berta is definitely from the land. She is manipulative, possessive and highly demanding, while Ondine is gentle and loving.

Tirrenio

He is the uncle of Ondine and also Lord of the Mediterranean Sea. He tries to warn Ondine that what she intends to do with Palemon goes against what is expected of her. When she chooses not to listen to his advice, he creates the conditions for a shipwreck where she is returned to the sea. When Ondine once again finds Palemon and realises how he has betrayed her, Tirrenio exacts a terrible revenge with his fellow Undines by causing death and destruction for all Palemon's guests.

== Original cast ==
Role	Description	Dancer
Ondine	A water nymph	Margot Fonteyn
Palemon		Michael Somes
Berta		Julia Farron
Tirrenio	Lord of the Mediterranean Sea	Alexander Grant
Hermit		Leslie Edwards
Ondines		Monica Mason, Brenda Taylor, Deirdre Dixon, Shirley Grahame, Georgina Gray, Margaret Wing, Christine Beckley, Doreen Eastlake, Jennifer Gay, Jacqueline Daryl, Vyvyan Lorrayne, Hylda Zinkin, Jennifer Layland, Patricia Thorogood, Audrey Henderson, Desmond Doyle, Ronald Hynd, Gary Burne, Christopher Newton, Ronald Plaisted, Petrus Bosman, Derek Rencher, Keith Rosson, Richard Farley
The Hunt	Act I	Dorothea Zaymes, Hylda Zinkin, Robin Haig, Patricia Thorogood, Brenda Bolton, Julie Wood, Peter Clegg, Ray Powell, Stanley Holde, Douglas Steuart, John Sale, William Wilson
Wood sprites	Act I	Merle Park, Doreen Wells, Mavis Osborn, Judith Sinclair, Antoinette Sibley, Ann Howard, Derek Rencher, Richard Farley, Keith Rosson, Graham Usher, Maurice Metliss, Benjamin Stevens
People from the port	Act II	Dorothea Zaymes, Hylda Zinkin, Robin Haig, Patricia Thorogood, Brenda Bolton, Julie Wood, Romayne Austin, Sandra Vane, Jane Bartlett, Maurice Metliss, Stanley Holden, Terry Westmoreland, Douglas Hill, Lambert Cox, Kenneth Barlow
Sailors	Act II	Ronald Plaisted, Derek Rencher, Keith Rosson, Christopher Newton, Richard Farley, Petrus Bosman, Douglas Steuart, John Sale, Graham Usher, Benjamin Stevens, William Wilson, Robert de Warren
Grand Pas Classique	Act III	Rosemary Lindsay, Annette Page, Ronald Hynd, Desmond Doyle, Brenda Taylor, Christine Beckley, Doreen Eastlake, Margaret Wing, Jacqueline Daryl, Audrey Henderson, Dorothea Zaymes, Ann Howard, Clover Roope, Brenda Bolton, Robin Haig, Julie Wood, Ronald Plaisted, Derek Rencher, Petrus Bosman, Richard Farley, Keith Rosson, Christopher Newton
Divertissement	Act III	Maryon Lane, Merle Park, Doreen Wells, Brian Shaw, Peter Clegg, Pirmin Trecu, Shirley Grahame, Deirdre Dixon, Georgina Gray, Judith Sinclair, Antoinette Sibley, Mavis Osborn, William Wilson, Douglas Steuart, Benjamin Stevens, Graham Usher, Stanley Holden, John Sale
Wedding guests	Act III	Ann Kenward, Myrleen Hedley, Rosalind Eyre, Louanne Richards, Janet Varley, Jane Bartlett, Kenneth Barlow, Robert de Warren, Clive Hicks, Maurice Metliss, Jeffrey Phillips, Lambert Cox
Lackeys, Footmen, Acolytes, Pages	Act III	Kenneth Barlow, Jeffrey Phillips, Clive Hicks, Douglas Hill, Arthur Sweet, Anthony Mangan, David Hughes, Alan Cooper, David Gordon, John Bodemeaid
Solo pianist		Margaret Kitchin
Children's roles		Students of Edith Cavell Secondary School

== The music ==
Since the original 1958 production of the ballet, the score has been published as a standalone work, and has been used for other dance productions, which have also used the title Undine.

The score is constructed with the certainty of technical accomplishment and inlaid with a lyricism that emanated from his experience of Italian life and Mediterranean colour. The score combines various genres, including the Neoclassicism from his early years. This combination of the genres of early German Romanticism and the neoclassicism of Stravinsky gives the score a 'modern' sound "automatically made it anathema to the avant-garde of the 1950s". Therefore, the music was often seen as revolutionary and not suited to ballet.

=== Act 1 ===
The score has a slow opening and immediately provides a romantic sense of mystery. However, the music then launches into a quicker tempo, brass fanfares propelling the music along with a rhythmically incisive motif. An andante section for strings follows using a straightforward lilting rhythm. The simplicity of this section is a marked contrast to the next, marked vivace where the different parts of the orchestra compete with each other with an underlying consistent rhythmic drive. The following section is also manufactured of contrasts with lyrical strings followed by a solo clarinet and sparse accompaniment. High strings, harp (for the watery effect) and occasional percussion provide another contrasting orchestral sound, before the composer again re-assembles his palette of orchestral colours, using solo instruments in small groups, or alone, or high violins in long notes soaring above moving fragments of ideas below. The finale of act 1 has an uneven rhythm with sudden accents darting about in Stravinskian fashion, the music being punctuated here and there by astringent wind chords.

=== Act 2 ===
This act begins by reestablishing the aura of romantic mystery which began act 1. This is evoked by the use of high violins and wind chords together, similar to that of Stravinsky's The Rite of Spring. The first movement is characterised by the constant change of tempo, while the second picks up influences from other musical styles in particular that of rhythmic impulse and swooning which characterised Ravel's work. The next movement features solid writing for a chorus of brass instruments, after which high violins are heard over a very low accompaniment. This section also features many solos for various instruments, followed by a pas de trois above a gently undulating accompaniment where lyrical melody lines are heard, with the oboe able to penetrate the whole texture in expressive fashion. The following variation is typical of 19th century ballet music and begins with the violins before spreading to the rest of the orchestra. Brass, prominent timpani and incisive pizzicato chords in the strings culminate in a sense of urgency in the music which prepares for the musical tension in the final act.

=== Act 3 ===
This act begins with a striking unison theme in the strings, soon interrupted by strident brass. This theme intensifies throughout the opening movement, recitative. The next movement, adagio, features a sweeter sound in the strings with a solo violin heard floating above the rest of the orchestral texture. The con elegenza that follows is marked by the sweeping sound of violins. Brass fanfares then introduce the pas de seize and this adagio contrasts the horns with high woodwind, while the harp adds to this effect. The tempo of the pas de seize varies and quiet lyrical moments may suddenly be interrupted by incisive brass and timpani. This section finishes with a Largo solenne movement. The connection between that movement and the final divertissement, marked Scene, begins with a vigorous and brilliant entrée. A pas de six in the same tempo includes virtuoso writing for the piano, which leads the orchestra for the ensuing pas de trois, though the orchestra controls the second pas de trois while the piano has more virtuoso work with rippling cascades of notes; before the Stravinskian rhythms emerge for piano and orchestra at the beginning of the pas de dix-huit. The orchestral momentum, of high violins en masse, sprightly wind writing, brass chords punctuating the highly charged rhythmic style, and a continuation of bravura piano writing, is maintained throughout the opening of the pas de six that follows. The orchestra then introduces a valse for a general dance (pas d’ensemble) that could almost belong to one of Ravel's more advanced scores. A pas d’action then begins to prepare for the finale. The tempo slows down, while "sparse textures with solo instrumental sounds floating above quiet accompanimental figures create a different sound world". The strings gently introduce the Dance of Sorrow, which then gains in intensity with a richer string texture. During the next variation, oboe, harp, and pitched percussion provide another watery timbre before the ballet moves to the final pas de deux. The final movement starts with gently pulsing chords that have a sweet but melancholy dissonance as Palemon is kissed by Ondine and dies.

=== Structure ===
Act 1
No. 1 – Lento
No. 2 – I. Allegretto, II. Andante, III. Vivace
No. 3 – Moderato
No. 4 – I. Adagio, II. Adagio
No. 5 – Andante con moto
No. 6 – I. Adagio, II. Vivace
No. 7 – Vivace assai
No. 8 – Andante
No. 9 – Allegro assai
No. 10 – Vivace, I. Largo
No. 11 – Adagio, I. Tranquillo, II. Lento, III. Finale. Allegro, IV. Finale. End

Act 2
No. 1 – Moderato
No. 2 – Andantino con moto
No. 3 – tempo = 80
No. 4 – I. Andante molto, II. tempo = 44
No. 5 – Pas de trois, I. Variation
No. 6 – Vivace
No. 7 – Molto mosso
No. 8 – Finale

Act 3
No. 1 – Recitative
No. 2 – Adagio, I. Allegro moderato, con eleganza
No. 3 – Pas de Seize Entrée, I. Adagio, II. Variation, III. Variation, IV. Variation, V. Coda
No. 4 – Scène
No. 5 – Divertissement, I. Entrée, II. Pas de six, III. Pas de trois I, IV. Pas de trois II, V. Pas de dix-huit, VI. Variation, VII. Variation, VIII. Variation, IX. Pas de six, X. Coda
No. 6 – Pas d'action, I. Variation
No. 7 – Finale, I. Dance of Sorrow, II. Variation, III. Pas de deux, IV. Epilogue

=== Instrumentation ===
- Strings: violins I, violins II, violas, cellos, double basses
- Woodwinds: flute, piccolo, oboe, English horn, clarinet, bass clarinet, bassoon, contrabassoon
- Brass: 4 French horns, 2 cornets (A, B-flat), 3 trumpets, 2 trombones, tuba
- Percussion: timpani, triangle, tamtam, 2 cymbals, bass drum, 2 tom-toms, snare drum, vibraphone
- Other: 2 harps, guitar, celesta, piano

== Ashton's choreography and setting ==
Dame Margot Fonteyn as Ondine in bronze by Nathan David, 1974

The consensus on Ashton's Ondine is that it has some very good things in it – and this is true; as is the implication that it is otherwise unsuccessful, not least because the music (which greatly disappointed Ashton himself) largely fails, except in the storm of act 2 and the divertissements of act 3. According to many critics, the music did not suit Ashton "who had been hoping for music as "radiant" as the Mediterranean from which its heroine was born". Yet the music does seem to fit its watery theme well: there are some beautiful passages to Ondine's act 3 "swimming" solo where the music seems thin and transparent as watercolour, and entirely suited to this sketch of the sea. The ballet is also a mixture of both the 19th and the 20th century, for the plot is quintessentially romantic while the music and choreography are more modern. Although it bore all the marks of Ashton's familiarly gentle, classically oriented manner, it discarded the classical ballet conventions that appear in such Ashton successes as Cinderella and Sylvia. What he was trying to suggest, says Ashton, was "the ebb and flow of the sea: I aimed at an unbroken continuity of dance, which would remove the distinction between aria and recitative." As a result, Ondine offered few pyrotechnics, gained its effects instead through sinuous mass movements in which the undulation of arm and body suggested forests of sea plants stirring to unseen tides. The sense of submarine fantasy was reinforced by Stage Designer Lila De Nobili's fine scenery: a castle of mist and fruitfulness, shadowy crags and waterfalls, aqueous skies streaked pink and green.

Ondine is not a classical construction with great set pieces (except for the wedding divertissement in the third act) or grand formal pas de deux, but a continuous, flowing narrative. However, this narrative is itself not very strong and there is no real explanation of why the lovers are on a ship in act 2, or what exactly has passed between acts 2 and 3 to convince Palemon to return to his mortal lover, Beatrice (Berta). The work uses classical ballet vocabulary, but the form varies a great deal from the 19th century classics. Unlike them, is through-composed: there are no breaks for bows to the audience built in and (at least until the third-act divertissement) no bravura variations to self-consciously elicit the audience's response. Henze's glittering music is the dominating force, although it is a difficult score to dance to, with the pulse well hidden within its general sheen, but it is atmospheric and often exciting, bringing the close of act 1 to a climax.

Although the narrative is not strong, the setting is and displays a "most convincing feel of the sea" and the "shimmer of water" which is very effective in this ballet which is filled with images of water and particularly of the sea. The first act of the ballet takes place in the courtyard of the castle of Palemon where Ondine is seen dancing in the waterfall. Other settings include a scene with Tirrenio and the ondines while another is on a ship during wild storm at sea where the sensation of motion while being on board ship is strong enough to make the audience seasick. The third act takes place in the Castle of Palemon located near the sea. The final tableau is not only exquisitely beautiful, with Ondine grieving over the body of her lover, but the surrounding ondines, their arms drifting like seaweed in the dim green light, uncannily evoke the shifting currents under the sea.

When Fonteyn danced the lead, the ballet was about her and her performance; however good today's interpreters may be, none has the mystique to reduce everyone else to the background, and so the supporting roles are now much more visible and need to be much more strongly depicted. It is generally accepted that Tirrenio was originally the most completely worked out role, inherited from Alexander Grant's lack of awe for Fonteyn; however the role has become difficult to cast as it was created to showcase Grant's unique mixture of gifts – classical virtuosity and flair for characterisation.

== Revivals ==
Although it was much lauded at the time, Ashton's Ondine disappeared from the repertory of The Royal Ballet for twenty years or so before Sir Anthony Dowell persuaded Ashton to let him revive it in 1988. It has become more entrenched in The Royal Ballet's repertoire and thus gives the audience a chance to evaluate this work without the aura that Fonteyn brought to it. Maria Almeida was chosen to revive the lead role in 1990 and Viviana Durante has subsequently continued in the tradition of Fonteyn. The role of Palemon was revived by Anthony Dowell and has subsequently been danced by Jonathon Cope. It was revived again for the 2008/2009 season at the Royal Opera House with Tamara Rojo and Edward Watson.

Ashton's choreography has so far had only one full production outside The Royal Ballet, by the Ballet of the Teatro alla Scala, Milan on 21 April 2000. Some commentators have noted that this is perhaps a consequence of its length (around 100 minutes) which does not compare with other twentieth century ballets. The ballet has also been staged at Sadler's Wells, London, and the Metropolitan Opera House, New York.

== Other productions ==
Following the original staging by The Royal Ballet, the Ashton/Henze production was later restaged in New York in 1960, and then again at the Teatro alla Scala, Milan on 21 April 2000, a performance conducted by Patrick Fournillier.

Other choreographers have used Henze's music, including Youri Vámos for the ballet of the Deutsche Oper Berlin (1987) and Torsten Händler in Chemnitz and the Semperoper Ballett in Dresden, Germany, has staged it regularly from 1989 as part of its repertoire using modern design. It was performed at the Volkstheater Rostock in March 2009.

=== Casts ===
Performance	Role	Dancer
1958, London (The Royal Ballet)	Ondine	Margot Fonteyn
1958, London (The Royal Ballet)	Palemon	Michael Somes
1958, London (The Royal Ballet)	Tirrenio, Lord of the Mediterranean Sea	Alexander Grant
1958, London (The Royal Ballet)	Berta	Julia Farron
1958, London (The Royal Ballet)	Hermit	Leslie Edwards
1958, London (The Royal Ballet)	Grand pas classique	Rosemary Lindsay, Annette Page, Ronald Hynd, Desmond Doyle
1958, London (The Royal Ballet)	Divertissement	Maryon Lane, Brian Shaw, Merle Park, Doreen Wells, Peter Clegg, Pirmin Trecu
1959, Monte Carlo (Ballets de Noël)	Ondine	Margot Fonteyn
1959, Monte Carlo (Ballets de Noël)	Palemon	Michael Somes
1964, London (The Royal Ballet)	Ondine	Margot Fonteyn
1964, London (The Royal Ballet)	Palemon	Donald MacLeary
1964, London (The Royal Ballet)	Tirrenio	Alexander Grant
1964, London (The Royal Ballet)	Berta	Deanne Bergsma
1970, London (The Royal Ballet) Tribute to Sir Frederick Ashton	Ondine	Christine Aitken
1981, London (The Royal Ballet) 50th Anniversary Programme	Divertissement	Wendy Ellis, Wayne Eagling, Laura Connor, Rosalyn Whitten, Stephen Beagley, Ashley Page
1988, London (The Royal Ballet)	Ondine	Maria Almeida
1988, London (The Royal Ballet)	Palemon	Anthony Dowell
1988, London (The Royal Ballet)	Tirrenio	Stephen Jefferies
1988, London (The Royal Ballet)	Berta	Deanne Bergsma
1988, London (The Royal Ballet)	Divertissement	Rosalyn Whitten, Bruce Sansom, Fiona Brockway, Nicola Roberts, Anthony Dowson, Jay Jolley
2000, Milan (Ballet of the Teatro alla Scala)	Undine	Alessandra Ferri
2000, Milan (Ballet of the Teatro alla Scala)	Palemon	Adam Cooper
2000, Milan (Ballet of the Teatro alla Scala)	Tirrenio	Biagio Tambone
2000, Milan (Ballet of the Teatro alla Scala)	Beatrice	Sabina Galasso
2008, London (The Royal Ballet)	Ondine	Tamara Rojo
2008, London (The Royal Ballet)	Palemon	Edward Watson
2008, London (The Royal Ballet)	Tirrenio	Ricardo Cervera
2008, London (The Royal Ballet)	Berta	Genesia Rosato

== Recordings ==
Undine was first recorded commercially in 1996: it was nominated for the 1999 Grammy Award for Best Orchestral Performance.

- Henze: Undine – London Sinfonietta, conductor: Oliver Knussen, piano: Peter Donohoe, 1996, Deutsche Grammophon 453467 (CD)

== Reviews ==
- "Fonteyn As 'Ondine', The New York Times, 7 December 1958
- "The Ballet: Fonteyn Scores in Ashton's Ondine", John Martin, The New York Times, 22 September 1960
- "Brian Shaw Is Dead; British Dancer, 63, Known as Classicist", [The New York Times, obituary of Brian Shaw, 23 April 1992
- "Lincoln Center Festival Review; The Royal Ballet Returns, Looking Very International", Anna Kisselgoff, The New York Times, 15 July 2004
- "An Elusive Water Sprite Flits By, Skirting the Depths", Roslyn Sulcas, The New York Times, 5 December 2008

== See also ==
- Ondine, ou La naïade – a ballet based on the same novella and produced in 1843 by Cesare Pugni and Jules Perrot
- Undine (Hoffmann) – an opera based on the same novel, with music by E. T. A. Hoffmann, produced in 1814
- Undine (Lortzing) – an opera based on the same novel, with music by Albert Lortzing, produced in 1845
- Undine – the novel by Friedrich de la Motte Fouqué, on which the story of Ondine is based
- Undina (Tchaikovsky) – an opera based on the same novel, with music by Pyotr Tchaikovsky, produced in 1869

== Notes ==
=== Sources ===
- Kennedy, Michael (1989). Portrait of Walton. Oxford University Press. ISBN 0-19-816705-9.
