= Undine (novella) =

1811 work by Friedrich de la Motte Fouqué

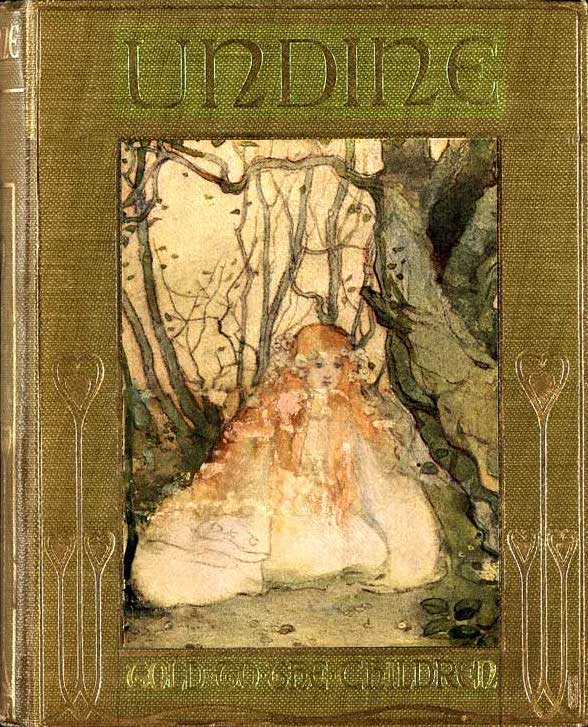
- Cover of Undine, Told to the Children by Mary Macgregor, illustrated by Katharine Cameron (London: T. C. & E. C. Jack)
- Author: Friedrich de la Motte Fouqué
- Language: German
- Genre: Fantasy novella
- Publication date: 1811
- Publication place: Germany
- Media type: Magazine story (later as a hardcover book)

Undine is a fairytale novella (Erzählung) by Friedrich de la Motte Fouqué in which Undine, a water spirit, marries a knight named Huldbrand in order to gain a soul. Published in 1811, it is an early German romance, which has been translated into English and other languages.

== Plot summary ==
A knight named Huldbrand comes across a fisherman's hut in the forest, and is welcomed in by the fisherman and his wife. He also meets their capricious eighteen-year-old foster daughter, Undine. The fisherman explains that years ago, their young daughter was lost in the lake and apparently drowned, but that same day, Undine appeared on their doorstep. Since then, they have raised her as their own.

Undine asks Huldbrand what he is doing in the forest. He explains that he was participating in a tournament when he met Bertalda, a duke's foster daughter. As they flirted, she promised to give him her glove if he would explore the haunted forest. He did so, encountering strange and threatening spirits until he reached the fisherman’s home.

A storm arrives and a flood surrounds the house, stranding the group. During their time together, Huldbrand and Undine fall in love, although she continues to behave erratically and can seemingly control the weather. An elderly priest, Father Heilmann, arrives after being washed overboard from a ferry. Huldbrand suggests that the priest marry him and Undine, and they hold the ceremony immediately.

The morning after the wedding, Undine suddenly acts like a completely different person, kind and gentle. She explains to Huldbrand that elemental beings exist and she is a water spirit. Her species does not have immortal souls or any sense of morals, but can gain them by marrying humans. She was sent to live among humans by her parents, who hoped she would earn a soul in this way, and with her marriage to Huldbrand she has accomplished this. She fears that Huldbrand will leave now that he knows what she is, but he swears never to abandon her.

With the flood receding, Huldbrand and Undine depart for his home. On the way they encounter Kuhleborn, a shapeshifting water spirit and Undine's uncle. She is now frightened of him and begs him to leave, and Huldbrand tries to attack him, only for Kuhleborn to vanish into a waterfall.

In the city, everyone welcomes Huldbrand back. Bertalda is deeply disappointed when she learns that he is now married, but becomes friends with Undine. One day, Kuhleborn visits Undine briefly, warning her of Bertalda. She rejects his warning but reveals at dinner that he told her who Bertalda's true parents are—Undine's own foster parents, the fisherman and his wife, whom she has brought to meet her. Bertalda is the child who they believed had drowned. Instead of the joyful reunion Undine expects, Bertalda feels humiliated to realize that she was born a peasant. She publicly reviles them and calls Undine a witch, but her identity is proven by her birthmarks.

Bertalda’s behavior causes both her foster parents and biological parents to disown her. Destitute, she begs Undine for forgiveness. Undine immediately takes her into her home, but Bertalda remains fearful of her, and Huldbrand's attraction to Bertalda resurfaces, leading to tension.

Undine orders the servants to seal up a fountain in their castle’s courtyard. Bertalda, who uses the water for her complexion, argues with her and complains to Huldbrand. He harshly demands an explanation. Undine explains that she is protecting their home from the malicious Kuhleborn, who would be able to enter through the fountain. She then asks Huldbrand never to speak angrily to her while they are near water, or her relatives will take her away. He contritely agrees.

Bertalda flees the castle in shame, and Huldbrand goes to rescue her. Kuhleborn, in different forms, torments and tricks the pair. He is about to drown them with a flood when Undine arrives, calms the waters, and carries them to safety.

The three live in peace for a while, until they decide to take a trip along the Danube to Vienna. While on the river, Kuhleborn continually torments them with storms, waves and frightening apparitions. The sailors and servants become suspicious of Undine as she magically stops these attacks, and Huldbrand begins to resent her. When a water spirit steals Bertalda's golden necklace, Undine immediately offers her a coral necklace to replace it. Seeing this as a sign that Undine is colluding with the spirits, Huldbrand throws the coral necklace overboard and accuses her of being a sorceress. As she predicted, Undine disappears into the river, but not before sadly warning him to remain true to her.

Huldbrand grieves her loss, but as time goes on, decides to marry Bertalda. He even asks Father Heilmann to perform the wedding, but he refuses. The priest has received messages from Undine and cautions Huldbrand against breaking his wedding vows by taking another wife while Undine still lives. Huldbrand himself dreams of Undine and Kuhleborn talking beneath the sea, saying that if Huldbrand marries another, Undine will be compelled to kill him. Undine says that she has protected the castle by sealing the fountain, so no water spirits including herself can go there, but Kuhleborn points out that Huldbrand will be doomed if he ever unseals the fountain or leaves the castle.

Despite these warnings, Huldbrand continues with the wedding. Immediately after the ceremony, Bertalda wishes for water from the sealed fountain. The servants uncover the fountain, only for the veiled and weeping Undine to rise from it. She enters the castle and kisses Huldbrand, drowning him with her tears. She appears once more during his funeral and transforms into a stream encircling his grave, so that she is eternally embracing him.

== Inspirations ==
The story was inspired by the works of the occultist Paracelsus (ca. 1493-1541), who coined the term "undine" (from Lithuanian language word Vandene (water=vanduo)). Paracelsus's Book on Nymphs states that undines can gain an immortal soul by marrying a human. It mentions the French legend of Melusine, in which a water-spirit marries a knight on condition that he shall never see her on Saturdays, when she resumes her mermaid shape, and the German story of Peter von Staufenberg, in which a fairy kills her human lover when he marries another woman.

Fouqué may have been more directly influenced by the Comte de Gabalis (1670), a Rosicrucian novel which adapted Paracelsus's ideas. Another model was probably the 1798 opera Das Donauweibchen, which—like Undine—is set around the Danube and features a love triangle between a man, a woman, and a water nymph.

== Success and influence ==
During the nineteenth century the book was very popular and was, according to The Times in 1843, "a book which, of all others, if you ask for it at a foreign library, you are sure to find engaged".

An unabridged English translation of the story by William Leonard Courtney and illustrated by Arthur Rackham was published in 1909. George MacDonald thought Undine "the most beautiful" of all fairy stories, while Lafcadio Hearn referred to Undine as a "fine German story" in his essay "The Value of the Supernatural in Fiction". The references to Undine in such works as Charlotte Mary Yonge's The Daisy Chain and Louisa Alcott's Little Women show that it was one of the best loved of all books for many 19th-century children.

The first adaptation of Undine was E. T. A. Hoffmann's opera in 1816. It was a collaboration between Hoffmann, who composed the score, and Friedrich de la Motte Fouqué who adapted his own work into a libretto. The opera proved highly successful, and Carl Maria von Weber praised it in his review as the kind of composition which the German desires: "an art work complete in itself, in which partial contributions of the related and collaborating arts blend together, disappear, and, in disappearing, somehow form a new world".

In the 1830s, the novella was translated into Russian dactylic hexameter verse by the Romantic poet Vasily Zhukovsky. This verse translation became a classic in its own right and later provided the basis for the libretto to Tchaikovsky's operatic adaptation. The novella has since inspired numerous similar adaptions in various genres and traditions.

Hans Christian Andersen was influenced by the portrayal of souls in Undine while writing "The Little Mermaid". In one of his letters he stated, "I have not, like de la Motte Fouqué in Undine, allowed the mermaid's acquiring of an immortal soul to depend upon an alien creature, upon the love of a human being. I'm sure that's wrong! It would depend rather much on chance, wouldn't it? I won't accept that sort of thing in this world. I have permitted my mermaid to follow a more natural, more divine path."

The breathing disorder known as central hypoventilation syndrome, when first identified in 1962, was nicknamed "Ondine's curse". This was based on a scene in Jean Giraudoux's 1938 play adaptation, Ondine, in which the dying love interest describes his difficulty breathing. Medical literature frequently misunderstood the play and thus confused the symptoms of the disorder, leading to criticism of the name.

== Adaptations ==
=== Opera ===
- Undine, E. T. A. Hoffmann, 1816
- Undine, Christian Friedrich Johann Girschner, 1830
- Undine, Albert Lortzing, 1845
- Undina, Alexei Lvov, 1846
- Undina, Pyotr Tchaikovsky, 1869
- Rusalka, Antonín Dvořák, 1901 (incorporating elements from Hans Christian Andersen's Little Mermaid)
- Undine, unfinished opera by Sergei Prokofiev, 1904–1907

=== Music ===
- Sonata Undine, a Romantic sonata for flute and piano (in E-minor) by Carl Reinecke, 1882
- "Ondine", a movement in Gaspard de la nuit by Maurice Ravel, 1908, channeling the poetic interpretation by Aloysius Bertrand (see "Literature")
- "Ondine", a piano prelude by Claude Debussy, 1911–1913
- "Undine", track 9 from the album Once I was an Eagle by Laura Marling, 2013
- "Watuaga Lake Song", track 3 from the album Tennessee Love Songs by Jonathan I Bogan, 2023, channelling a translation of Jean Giraudoux's Ondine
- "Undine", track 8 from the album The Waeve by The Waeve, 2023

=== Ballet ===
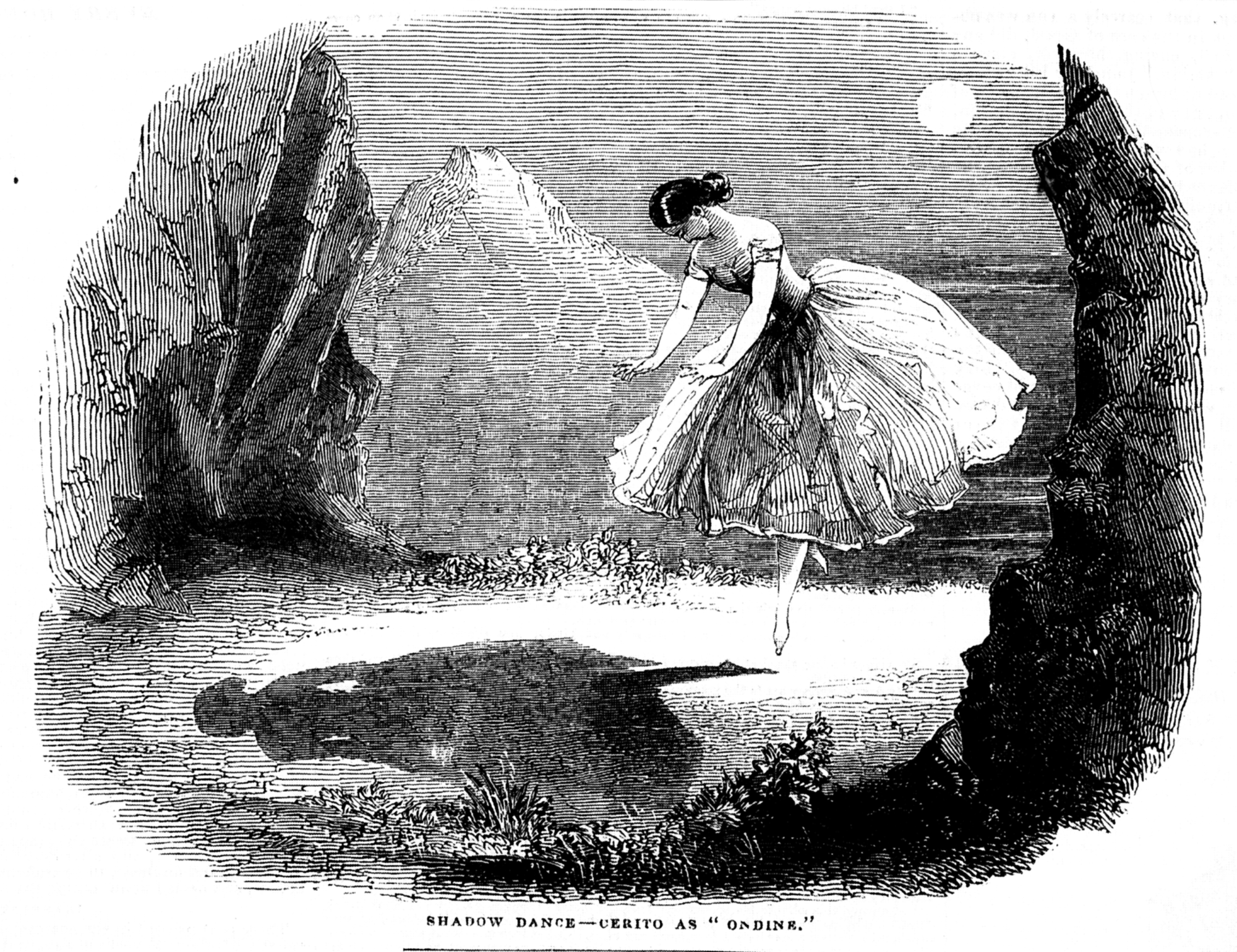
Fanny Cerrito dances the "Pas de l'ombre" in the original production of Perrot's ballet Ondine, London, 1843

- Ondine, composed by Cesare Pugni and choreographed by Jules Perrot, 1843
- Coralia, or the Inconstant Knight, choreographed by Paul Taglioni, 1847
- Undine, composed by Hans Werner Henze and choreographed by Frederick Ashton, 1958

=== Film ===
- Undine, a 1916 silent film
- The Loves of Ondine, a film by Andy Warhol
- Ondine, a 2009 film by Neil Jordan
- Undine, a 2020 film by Christian Petzold

=== Literature ===
- Ondine, ou la Nymphe des Eaux, a play by René-Charles Guilbert de Pixerécourt, 1830
- Undina, a verse translation by Vasily Zhukovsky, 1837
- "Ondine", a prose poem by Aloysius Bertrand, 1842
- Undine, an autobiographical book by Olive Schreiner, 1928
- Ondine, a play by Jean Giraudoux, 1939
- Undine geht, by Ingeborg Bachmann
- Haunted Waters, an adaptation for teen readers, by Mary Pope Osborne, 1994 (reissued 2006)

=== Art ===
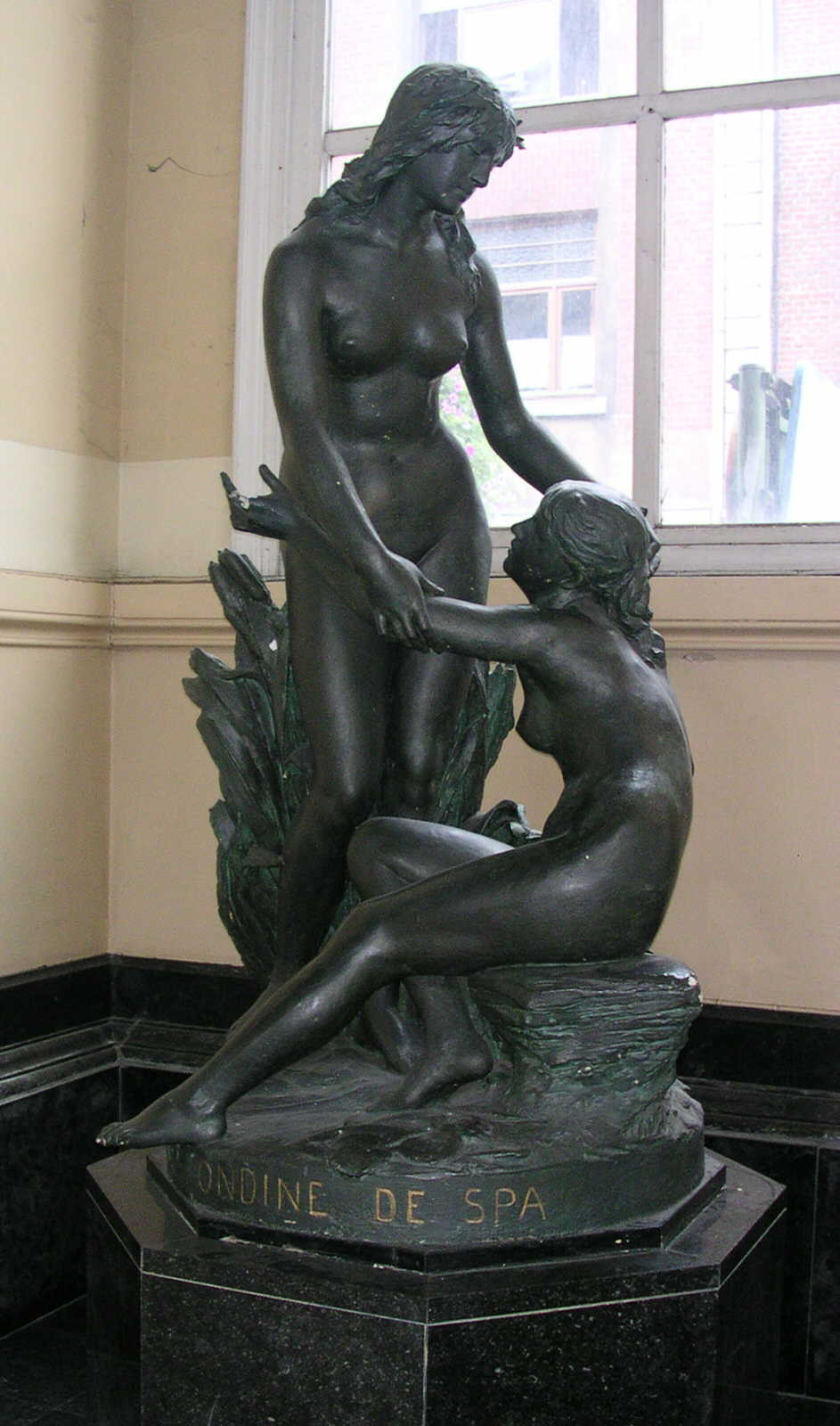
Ondine de Spa in Pouhon Pierre-le-Grand, Spa, Belgium

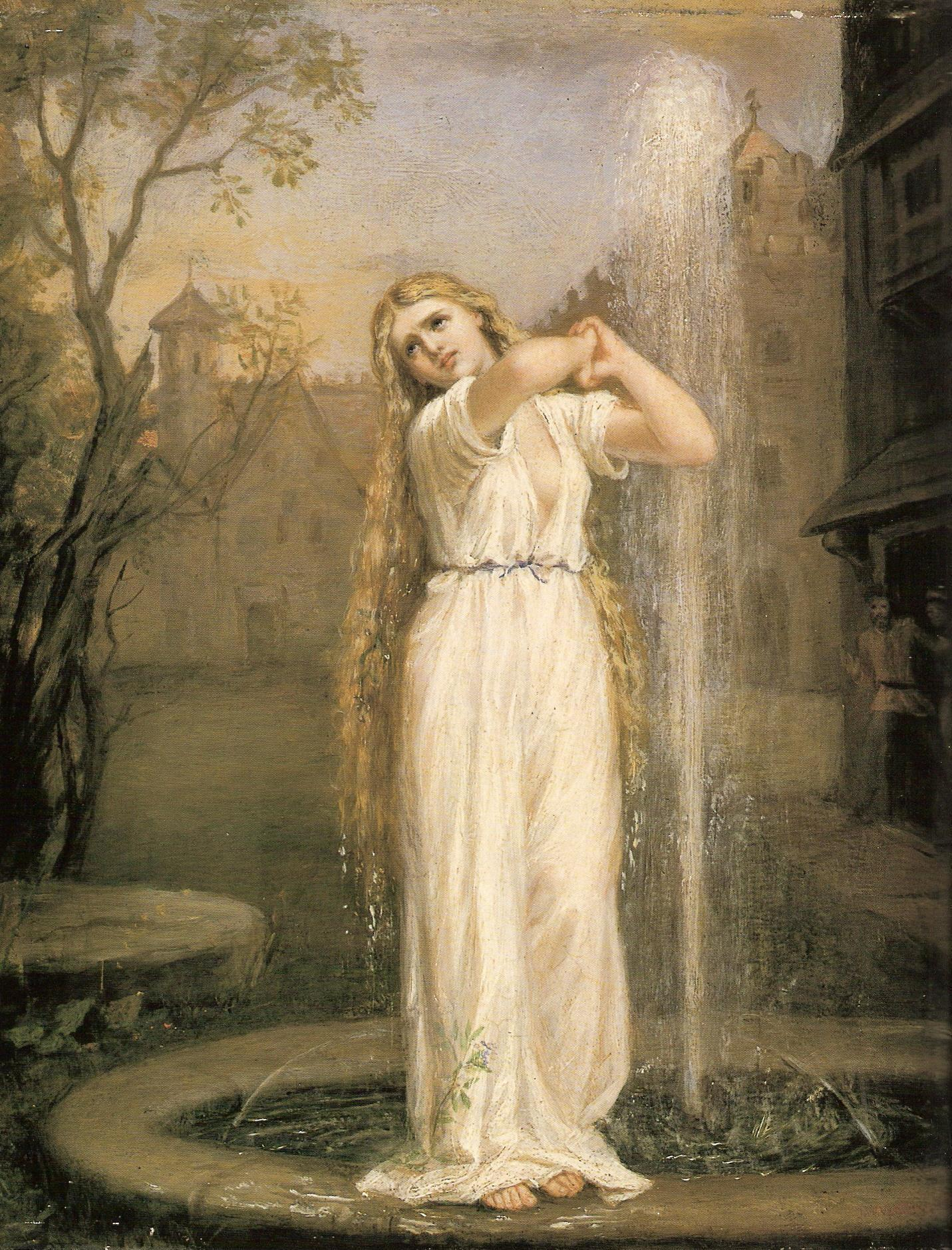
Undine by John William Waterhouse, 1872

- Undine and Huldbrand, a painting by Henry Fuseli, 1819–1822
- Undine, a painting by Moritz Retzsch, 1830
- Undine, a painting by John William Waterhouse, 1872
- Ondine, a painting by Paul Gauguin, 1889
- Undine, a painting by Henri Fantin-Latour
- Undine, a painting by Daniel Maclise
- Undine, a painting by J. M. W. Turner
- Undine, illustrations by Arthur Rackham
- Ondine de Spa, sculpture in Pouhon Pierre-le-Grand, Spa, Belgium
- Undine with harp, a sculpture by Ludwig Michael von Schwanthaler, 1855
