= Undine (medical) =

Ophthalmic irrigation device

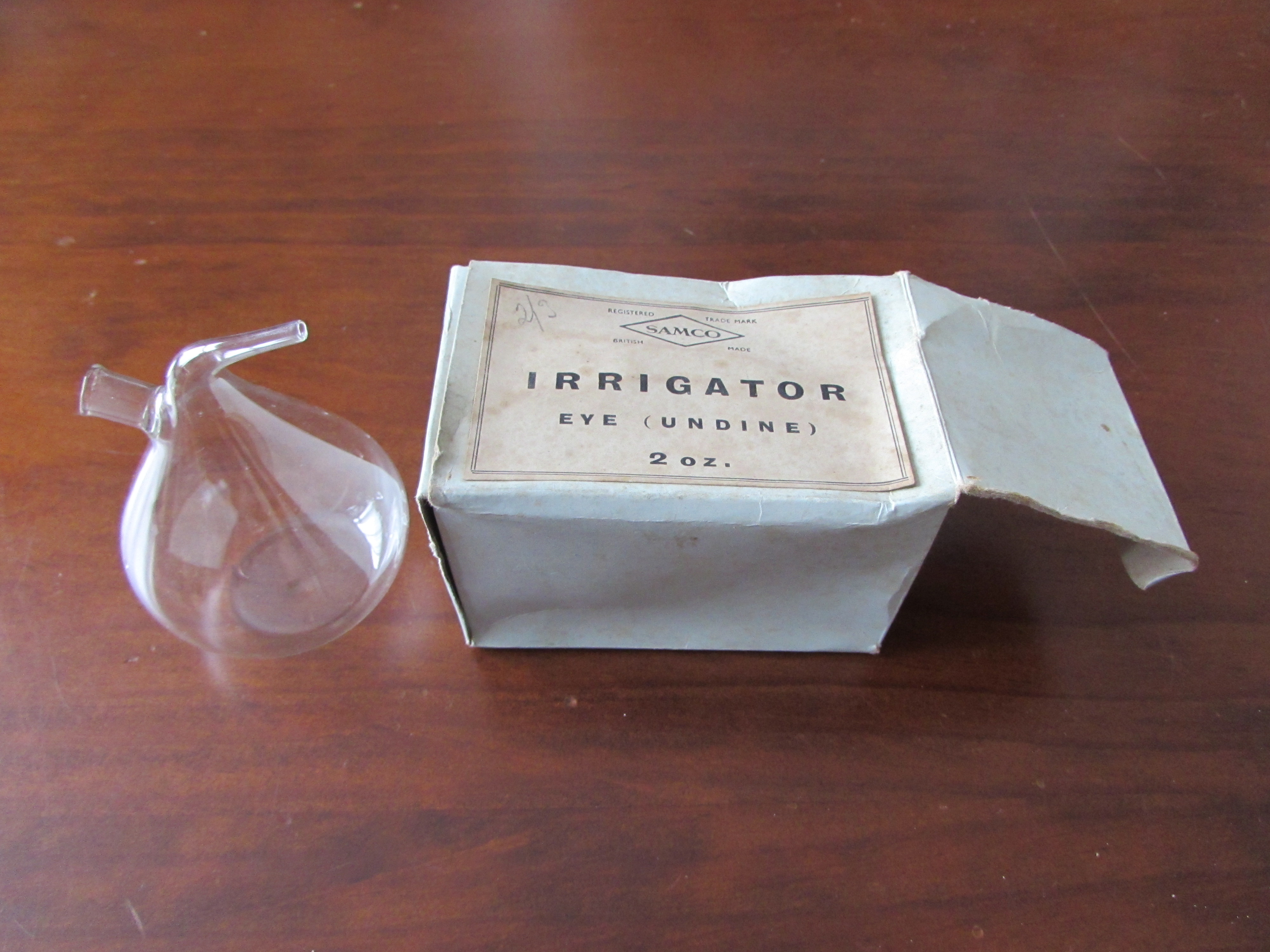
An undine with its original box

An undine is an ophthalmic irrigation device which was used to trickle a cleansing liquid over the conjunctival surface while controlling the flow with the thumb or finger over the filling hole. It has now been superseded by more modern equipment.

The undine is a spherical or pear-shaped glass flask generally about 2 to 3 inches in diameter with a 2 to 3-inch narrowing spout on one side and a collared opening on the top about half an inch wide.

They were used predominantly from the 1930s to the 1960s after which single-use plastic disposable equivalents became available. As glass undines require careful cleaning and sterilization after each use, single-use plastic equivalents were preferred as they are cheaper and require no careful handling.
