= French submarine Ondine =

Two submarines of the French Navy have borne the name Ondine:

- French submarine Ondine (Q121), an Ariane-class submarine commissioned in August 1928 and sunk in a collision in October 1928
- French submarine Ondine (Q166), an Orion-class submarine commissioned in 1932 and scrapped in 1943
