= Undina (Tchaikovsky) =

Opera fragment by Tchaikovsky

- Opera fragment by Tchaikovsky
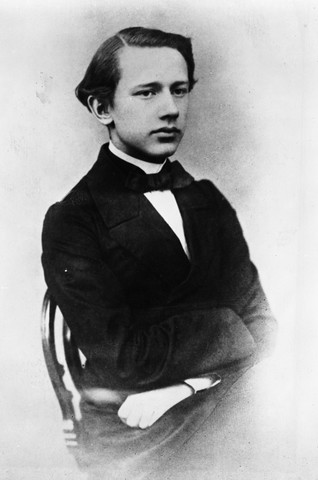
- Photography of Tchaikovsky as a student at the Moscow Conservatory, 1863
- Native title: Russian: Ундина
- Librettist: Vladimir Sollogub
- Language: Russian
- Based on: Ondine by De la Motte Fouqué

Undina (sometimes Undine or Ondine) (Russian: Ундина) is an opera in three acts by Pyotr Ilyich Tchaikovsky. The work was composed in 1869. The libretto was written by Vladimir Sollogub, and is based on Vasily Zhukovsky's translation of Friedrich de la Motte Fouqué's novella Ondine.

== History ==
The opera was composed during the months of January to July 1869, but Tchaikovsky destroyed the score in 1873, preserving only a few numbers from the opera. The opera has never been performed in its entirety.

The only extracts that survive are:

1. Introduction
2. Aria: "Waterfall, my uncle, streamlet, my brother" (Undina)
3. Chorus: "Help, help! Our stream is raging"
4. Duet: "O happiness, O blessed moment" (Undina, Huldbrand)
5. Chorus: "O hours of death" (soloists, chorus)

At least three of these pieces – the aria, the duet, and the final chorus – were performed at the Moscow premiere at the Bolshoi Theatre in Moscow on 28 March 1870.

Some music from the opera was subsequently re-used in Tchaikovsky's other works:

- The bridal procession of act 3 was adapted for the Andantino marziale of his Symphony No. 2 "Little Russian" (1872).
- The introduction was used unchanged as the introduction to his incidental music to Ostrovsky's play The Snow Maiden (1873).
- Undina's aria was somewhat altered and put to use as the first song of Lel in The Snow Maiden.
- The duet was recycled as the duet (No. 13-V) of Siegfried and Odette in act 2 of Swan Lake (1875–1876). The vocal parts were replaced by solo cello and violin.

== Roles ==
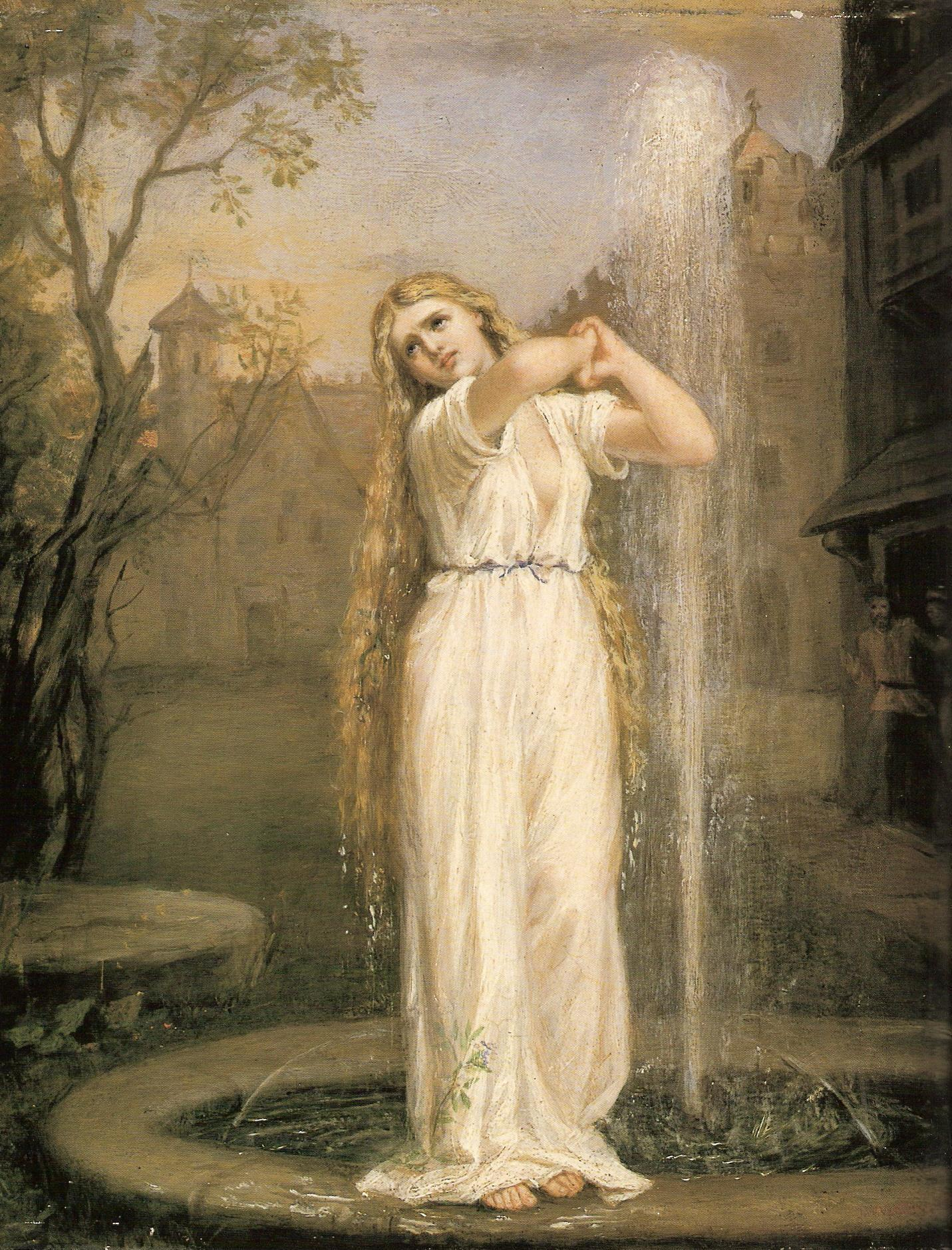
Undine (1872) by John William Waterhouse

Roles, voice types, premiere cast
Role	Voice type	Premiere cast 28 March [OS 16 March] 1870 Conductor: Eduard Merten
Goldmann, an old fisherman	bass	
Bertha, his wife	mezzo-soprano	
Undina, their adopted daughter	soprano	A. Alexandrova-Kochetova
Huldbrand, a knight	tenor	Aleksandr Dodonov
The Duke	bass	
Berthalda, the Duke's daughter	mezzo-soprano	
Chorus, silent roles: People

== Instrumentation ==
- Strings: violins, violas, cellos, and double basses
- Woodwinds: piccolo, 2 flutes, 2 oboes, 2 clarinets (B-flat), 2 bassoons
- Brass: 4 horns (all F), 2 trumpets (B-flat), 2 trombones, tuba
- Percussion: timpani, triangle, cymbals, bass drum
- Other: harp, piano

== Setting ==
Time: The 15th century

Place: Germany, near the springs of the Danube; Ringstetten Castle (Burg Ringstetten)

== Recordings ==
Vocal and orchestral numbers

- "Excerpts from the Opera Undine" Tamara Milashkina (Undine), Yevgeny Raikov (Gulbrand), Moscow Radio Chorus (Konstantin Lebedev, director), Moscow Radio Symphony Orchestra, Yevgeny Akulov, conductor. Melodiya / ABC Westminster Gold WGS 8300, 1975. LP.
  Features three selections from Undina: act 1: Undine's Song; act 1: Finale; act 3: Duet of Undine and Gulbrand.
- "Undine: fragments from the unfinished opera" Tamara Milashkina (Undine), Yevgeny Raikov (Gulbrand), Moscow Radio Chorus, Moscow Radio Symphony Orchestra, Yevgeny Akulov. Melodiya, 1988. CD.
  A CD reissue of the above LP, subsequently re-released by Mobile Fidelity Sound Lab (Petaluma, California) in 1989. It features the same three selections as in the 1975 issue, plus the introduction (Ouverture), with the Moscow Radio Symphony Orchestra conducted by Alexander Gauk.
- "Vodopad moy dyadya" from Undina, On Guilty Pleasures. Renée Fleming, soprano, Philharmonia Orchestra, Sebastian Lang-Lessing, conductor. London/Decca B0019033-02, 2013. CD.
- Undina: surviving fragments. Anna Aglatova (Undina), Aleksey Tataritsev (Gulbrand), Tchaikovsky Symphony Orchestra and Chorus of the Popov Academy of Choral Arts, Vladimir Fedoseyev, conductor. Published 23 November 2015.
  Concert performance of all five surviving numbers, including the previously unrecorded "Bridal March", recorded 13 November 2015 at the Tchaikovsky Concert Hall in Moscow, with Mikhail Fillipov reciting extracts from Zhukovsky's story.
