= Potameides =

Nymphs of rivers

In Greek mythology, potameides (Ancient Greek: ποταμηίδες) is a name for nymphs of rivers. It is used by Apollonius of Rhodes, who writes that, when Jason summoned the goddess Hecate:

All the watery meadows shook at her footstep, and the marsh-dwelling river nymphs [ποταμηίδες] wailed, those who dance around that marshy meadow of Amarantian Phasis.

A scholium on the Iliad (a marginal note in a manuscript of the work), from the A family of scholia, states that epipotamídes (ἐπιποταμίδες) is the name given to nymphs of rivers.
