= Undine (Hoffmann) =

1816 opera by E. T. A. Hoffmann

- Opera by E. T. A. Hoffmann
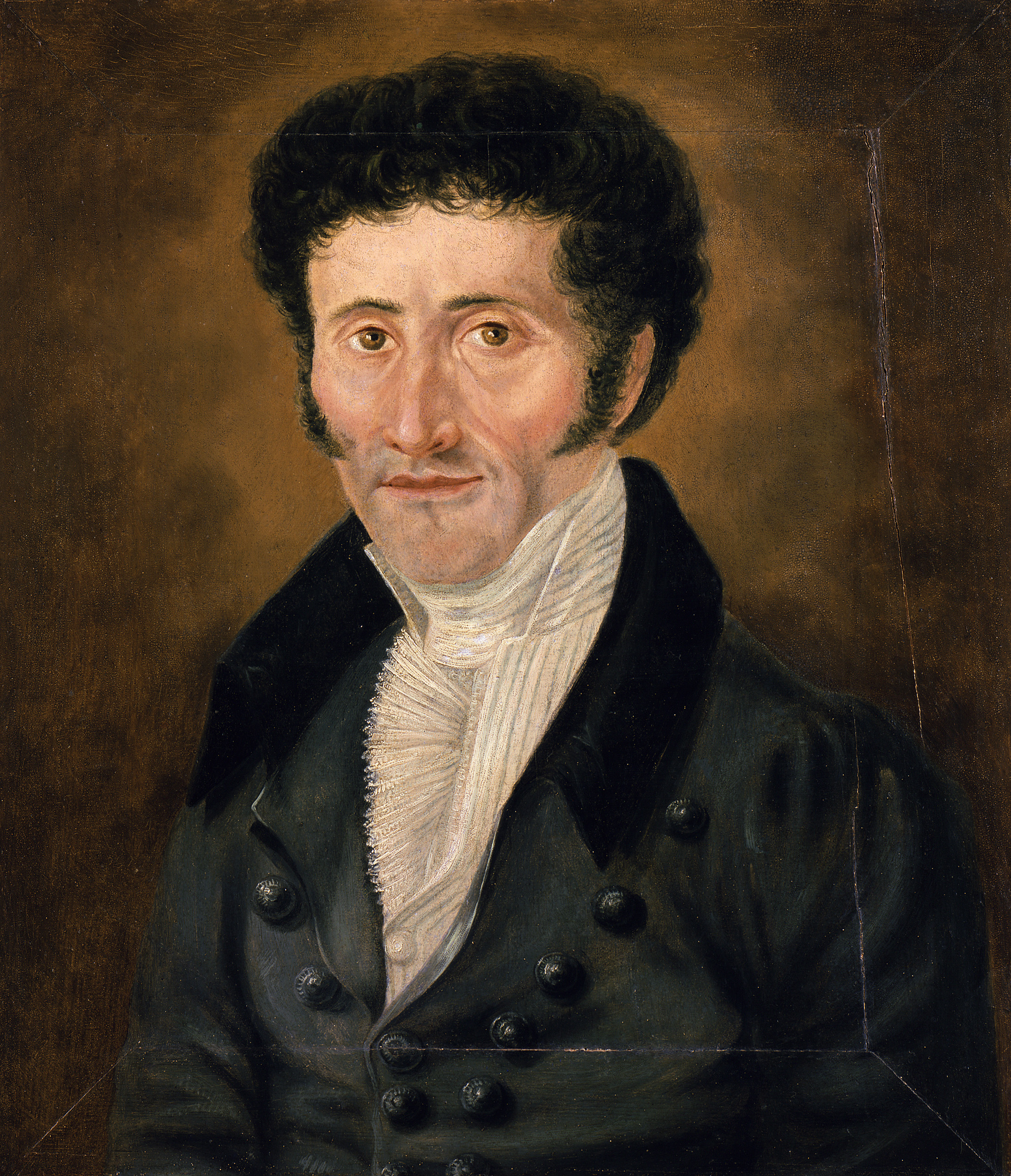
- E. T. A. Hoffmann, self portrait
- Librettist: Friedrich de la Motte Fouqué
- Language: German
- Based on: Undine by Fouqué
- Premiere: 3 August 1816; Königliches Schauspielhaus, Berlin

Undine is an opera, with spoken dialogue, in three acts by the German composer and author E. T. A. Hoffmann (1776-1822). The libretto, by Friedrich de la Motte Fouqué, is based on his own story Undine (1811). It received its premiere at the Königliches Schauspielhaus in Berlin on 3 August 1816. Undine was Hoffmann's greatest operatic success and a major influence on the development of German Romantic opera.

Carl Maria von Weber's enthusiastic review of the opera admired it as "an art work complete in itself, in which partial contributions of the related and collaborating arts blend together, disappear, and, in disappearing, somehow form a new world".

It was revived by the Wuppertal Opera in 1970.

There is a 1960 recording (including the spoken dialogue) by the Choir and Symphony Orchestra of the Bavarian Radio, conductor: Jan Koetsier, Undine: Rita Streich, Hulbrand von Ringstetten: Raimund Grumbach, Berthalda: Melitta Muszely, Kuhleborn: Karl-Christian Kohn, Ein alter Fischer: Max Proebstl, Seine Frau: Sunhild Rauschkolb, Heilmann: Kieth Engen, Herzog: Anton Rosner, Herzogin: Marjorie Heistermann; and a 3 CDs 1993 recording (leaving out the spoken dialogue) by the Berlin Radio Symphony Orchestra and the Choir of St. Hedwig's Cathedral in Berlin, conductor: Roland Bader; Roland Hermann, Hans Franzen, Elisabeth Glauser, Krisztina Laki, Heikki Orama, Karl Ridderbusch, Ulrich Ress, Dora Koschak, Mani Mekler.

== Roles ==
Roles, voice types, premiere cast
Role	Voice type	Premiere cast, 3 August 1816 Conductor: Bernhard Romberg
Undine	soprano	Therese Eunicke-Schwachhofer
Huldbrand	baritone	Heinrich Blume
Berthalda	soprano	Emilie Willmann
Heilmann	bass	Johann Gottfried Karl Wauer
Kühleborn	bass	
Fisherman	bass	Johann Georg Gern
Fisherman's wife	mezzo-soprano	Wilhelmine Leist
Archduke	tenor	Friedrich Eunicke
Archduchess	mezzo-soprano	Johanna Eunicke
