= Friedrich de la Motte Fouqué =

German writer (1777–1843)

- Born: 12 February 1777; Brandenburg an der Havel, Brandenburg, Kingdom of Prussia, Holy Roman Empire
- Died: 23 January 1843 (aged 65); Berlin, Prussia, German Confederation
- Occupations: Writer, novelist
- Writing career
- Genre: Fantasy
- Notable work: Undine
- Movement: German romanticism

Friedrich Heinrich Karl de la Motte, Baron Fouqué (German: [ˈfʁiːdʁɪç də la ˌmɔtfuˈkeː]; 12 February 1777 – 23 January 1843) was a German writer of the Romantic style.

== Biography ==
He was born at Brandenburg an der Havel, of a family of French Huguenot origin, as evidenced in his family name. His grandfather, Heinrich August de la Motte Fouqué, had been one of Frederick the Great's generals and his father was a Prussian army officer.

Although not originally intended for a military career, Friedrich de la Motte Fouqué ultimately gave up his university studies at Halle to join the army, and he took part in the Rhine campaign of 1794. The rest of his life was devoted mainly to literary pursuits. He was introduced to August Wilhelm Schlegel, who deeply influenced him as a poet ("mich gelehret Maß und Regel | Meister August Wilhelm Schlegel") and who published Fouqué's first book, Dramatische Spiele von Pellegrin, in 1804.

=== Marriage ===
Fouqué's first marriage was unhappy and soon ended in divorce. His second wife, Caroline Philippine von Briest (1773–1831), enjoyed some reputation as a novelist in her day. After her death Fouqué married a third time. Some consolation for the ebbing tide of popular favour was afforded him by the munificence of Frederick William IV of Prussia, who granted him a pension which allowed him to spend his later years in comfort. He died in Berlin in 1843.

For Fouqué's life see Lebensgeschichte des Baron Friedrich de la Motte Fouqué (only to the year 1813), Aufgezeichnet durch ihn selbst (Halle, 1840), and also the introduction to Koch's selections in the Deutsche Nationalliteratur.

== Literary work ==
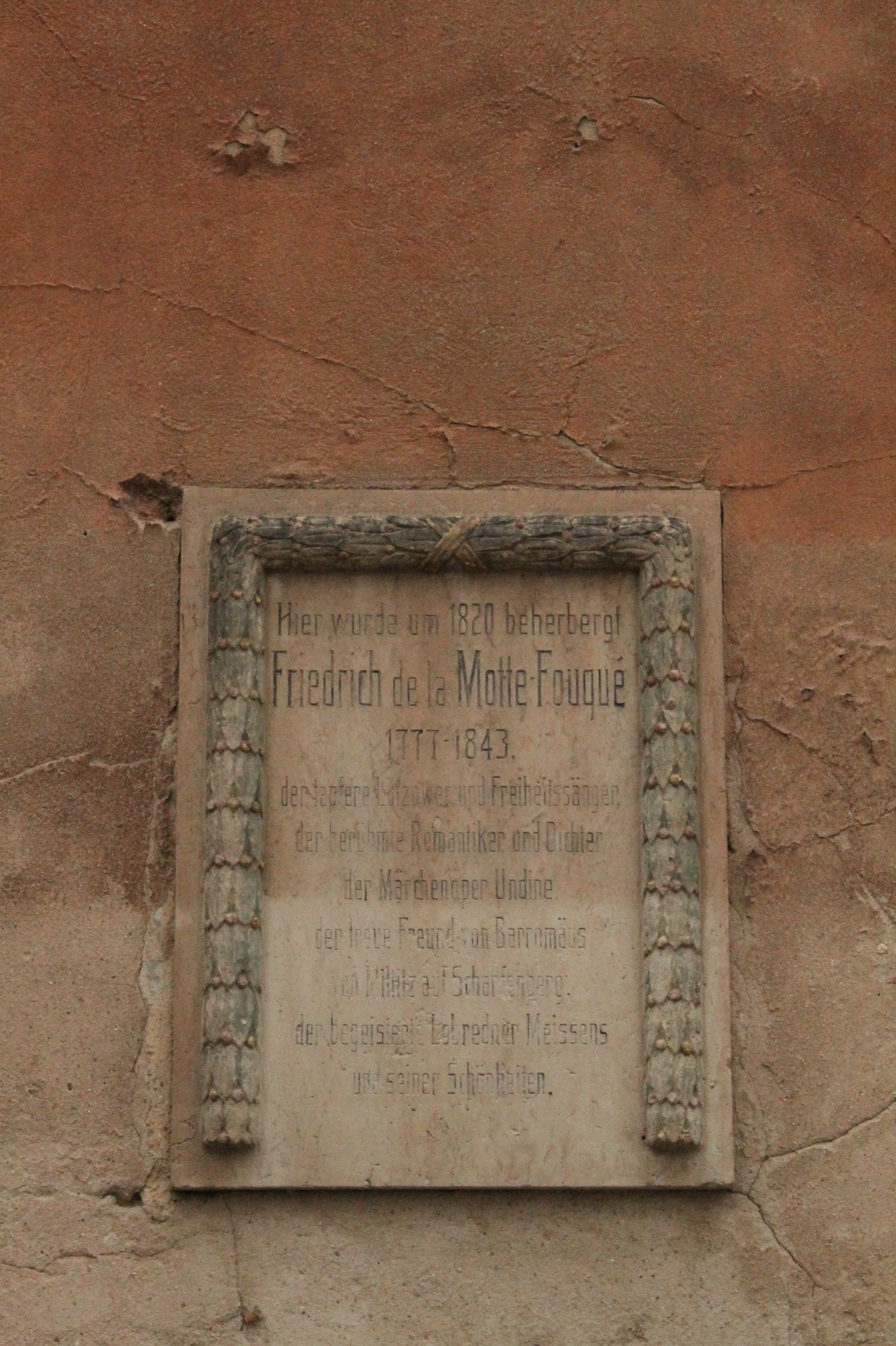
Memorial plaque to Friedrich de la Motte Fouqué in Meissen

=== Romantic roots ===
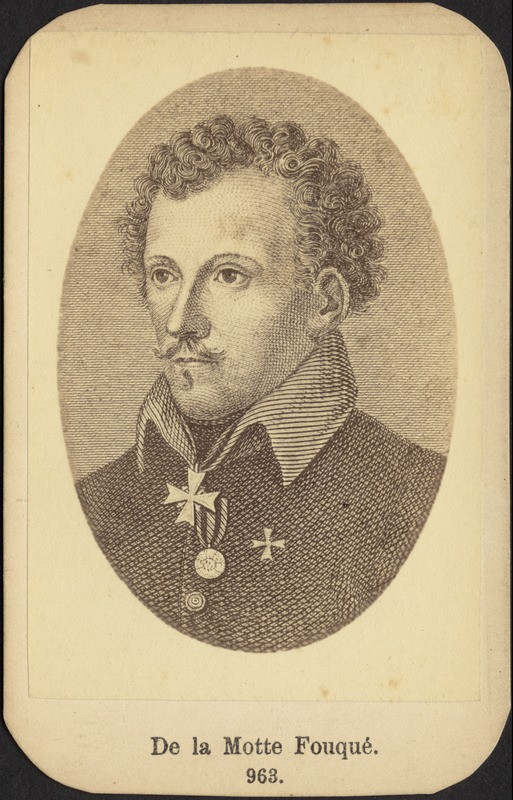
De la Motte Fouqué, [ca. 1859–1870]. Carte de Visite Collection, Boston Public Library.

After Dramatische Spiele von Pellegrin, his second work, Romanzen vom Tal Ronceval (1805), showed more plainly his allegiance to the romantic leaders, and in the Historie vom edlen Ritter Galmy (1806) he versified a 16th-century romance of medieval chivalry.

Sigurd der Schlangentödter, ein Heldenspiel in sechs Abentheuren (1808), was the first modern German dramatization of the Nibelung legend combining Icelandic sources such as the Volsunga Saga and the Middle High German Nibelungenlied. The play and its two sequels Sigurds Rache (1809) and Aslaugas Ritter (1810) were published together under the title Der Held des Nordens in 1810 ["The Hero of the North"]. The trilogy brought Fouqué to the attention of the public, and had a considerable influence on subsequent versions of the story, such as Friedrich Hebbel's Nibelungen and Richard Wagner's Der Ring des Nibelungen.

These early writings indicate the lines which Fouqué's subsequent literary activity followed; his interests were divided between medieval chivalry on the one hand and northern mythology on the other. In 1813, the year of the rising against Napoleon, he again fought with the Prussian army, and the new patriotism awakened in the German people left its mark upon his writings.

=== Popular works ===
Were I asked, what is a fairytale? I should reply, Read Undine: that is a fairytale ... of all fairytales I know, I think Undine the most beautiful. (George MacDonald, The Fantastic Imagination)

Between 1810 and 1815, Fouqué's popularity was at its height; the many romances and novels, plays and epics which he produced with extraordinary rapidity, appealed greatly to the mood of the hour. Undine appeared around 1811, the only work by which Fouqué's memory still lives today. A more comprehensive idea of his talent may, however, be obtained from the two romances Der Zauberring (1812) and Die Fahrten Thiodolfs des Isländers (1815).

=== Later years ===
From 1820 onwards the quality of Fouqué's work deteriorated, partly owing to the fatal formal ease with which he wrote, and he failed to keep pace with the changes in German taste by clinging to the paraphernalia of romanticism. His rivals applied a sobriquet of "Don Quixote of Romanticism" to him.

=== Translations ===
Most of Fouqué's works have been translated. Menella Bute Smedley, for instance, translated his ballad, "The Shepherd of the Giant Mountains". The English versions of Aslauga's Knight (by Thomas Carlyle), Sintram and his Companions and Undine have been frequently republished. A number of his short stories were translated in Popular Tales and Romances of the Northern Nations (1823).

=== Influence ===
Fouqué's play Der Sängerkrieg auf der Wartburg ("The Song Contest on the Wartburg") is likely one of the sources for Wagner's Tannhäuser. Goethe was not impressed by it, remarking to Eckermann: "We both agreed that all his life this poet had engaged in old Germanic studies, however without being able to develop this into a culture of his own making."

Robert Louis Stevenson admired Fouqué's story "Galgenmännlein" and wrote his own version ("The Bottle Imp") with a Hawaiian setting.

John Henry Newman and Charlotte Mary Yonge both praised Sintram and his Companions. William Morris also became an admirer of Sintram and his Companions, and it influenced Morris' own fiction.

Sintram and his Companions and Undine are referred to in Little Women by Louisa May Alcott; the character Jo mentions wanting them for Christmas in the first chapter of the book and finally receives them in chapter 22. Aslauga's Knight as well as Sintram and his Companions and Undine are referred to in Jo's Boys, the final book in Alcott's Little Women series, where the story of Aslauga's Knight mirrors the character Dan and his affection for gentle Bess. Undine is the basis, along with Hans Christian Andersen's Little Mermaid, for Dvořák's opera Rusalka.

== Bibliography ==
- Steele, Bruce, ed. (2015). Richard Wagner As Poet and Thinker: Ten Lectures by JG Robertson. Melbourne: Australian Scholarly Publishing, 2015. ISBN 9781925003567.
- Ausgewählte Werke, edited by himself, in 12 vols. (Berlin, 1841)
- A selection, edited by M. Koch, in Kürschner's Deutsche Nationalliteratur, vol. 146, part ii. (Stuttgart, 1893)
- Undine, Sintram, etc., in innumerable reprints. *Bibliography in Karl Goedeke's Grundriss zur Geschichte der deutschen Dichtung (2nd ed., vi. pp. 115 ff., Dresden, 1898).
- Undine, trans. Paul Turner. German Romantic Stories. Ed. Frank G. Ryder. New York: Continuum, 1998. (The German Library, vol. 35). 15–90.
- Fouqué und einige seiner Zeitgenossen, Arno Schmidt (Bläschke 1958; 2nd Revised Edition 1960), also in the Bargfelder Edition, Volume III/1 (1993)
- This article incorporates text from a publication now in the public domain: Robertson, John George (1911). "Fouqué, Friedrich Heinrich Karl de la Motte". In Chisholm, Hugh (ed.). Encyclopædia Britannica. Vol. 10 (11th ed.). Cambridge University Press. pp. 749–750.
