= Wunda =

Wunda is a dark spirit in Indigenous Australian aboriginal mythology.

Wunda may also refer to:

- Wunda (crater), an enigmatic bright feature on Uranus's moon Umbriel.
