= Skynd =

Skynd may refer to:

- Skynd (band), an industrial rock band focused on true crime music
- Skynd (crater), a crater on Umbriel, a moon of Uranus
- Skynd (troll), a troll in a Danish fairy tale
