= The Dream of Belinda =

1780s painting by Henry Fuseli

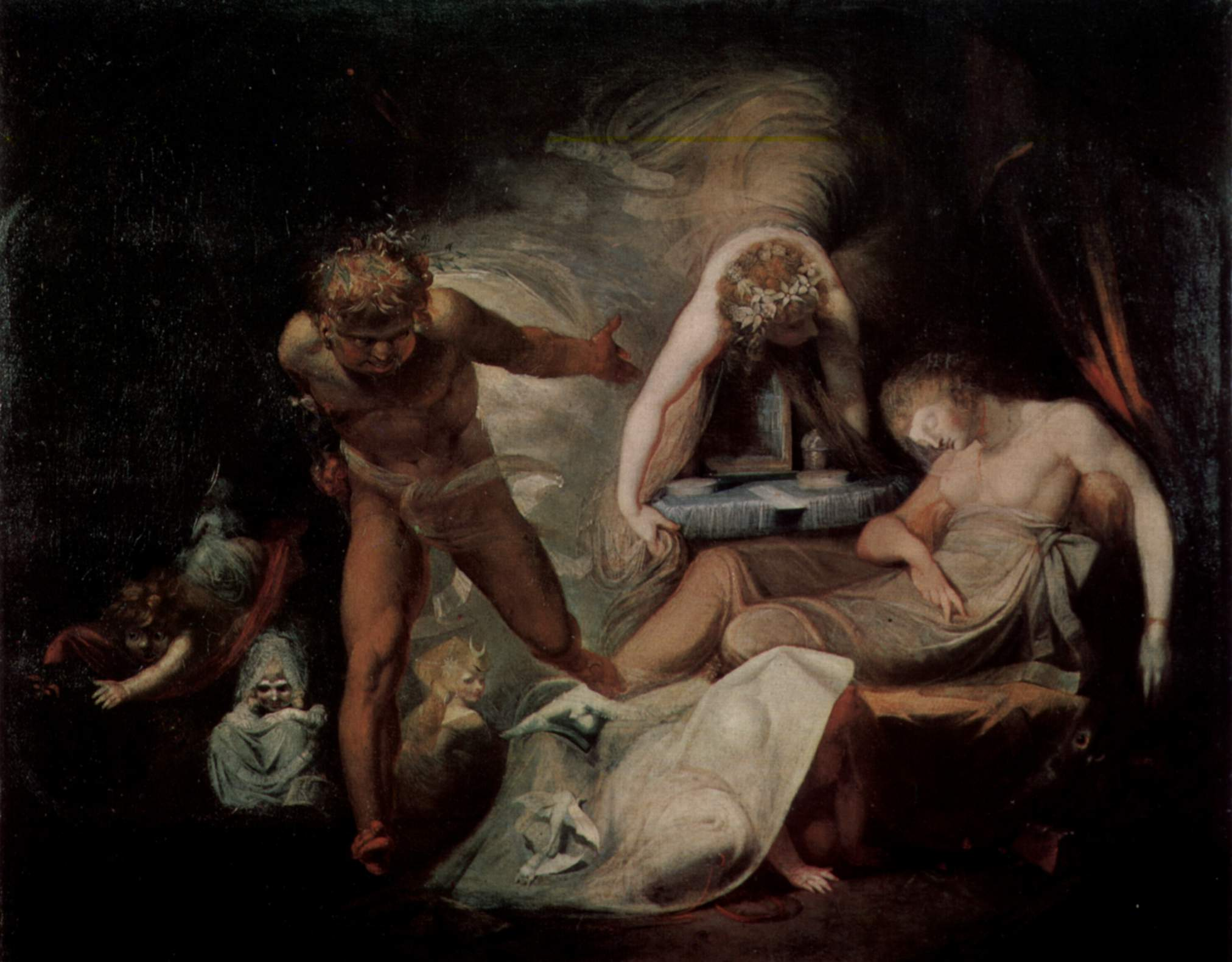
- Artist: Henry Fuseli
- Year: c. 1780–1790
- Medium: Oil on canvas
- Dimensions: 100 cm × 126 cm (39.5 in × 49.5 in)
- Location: Vancouver Art Gallery, Vancouver
- Accession: 34.12

The Dream of Belinda is an oil on canvas painting by Swiss artist Henry Fuseli, from c. 1780–1790. It was inspired in the poem The Rape of the Lock by Alexander Pope. According to scholar Robert Halsband, this "brilliant" work is no illustration, rather an imaginative fusion of elements and themes from the poem with "symbols from Fuseli's own world of dreams and fantasy".

== Background ==
In his artworks and his writings, and perhaps in part due to the influence of compatriot Johann Jakob Bodmer, Fuseli drew inspiration time and again from the classics of world literature, including Homer, Virgil, Ovid, Dante, Spenser, Shakespeare, Milton, and the Nibelungenlied. This outpouring included nine paintings for Boydell's Shakespeare Gallery and forty-seven for his own Milton Gallery. Private correspondence shows a less enthusiastic attitude towards 18th-century English poetry, with Pope's "metrical and rimed prose", "dull monotony of ear", and "drowsy psalmody" singled out by the artist for particular criticism. But there was an exception: "Pope never shewed poetic genius but once, and that, in 'The Rape of the Lock'".

During the course of his career and as an illustrator, Fuseli would contribute designs for editions of Smollett's Adventures of Peregrine Pickle (1769), Erasmus Darwin's Botanic Garden (1789–91), Gray's Poems (1800), Milton's Paradise Lost (1802), Thomson's Seasons (1802), and Cowper's Poems (1806). Amongst these, the Gray, Milton, and Thomson illustrations were for the publisher Francis Isaac Du Roveray who, in 1798, wrote to Fuseli for a drawing of "The Cave of Spleen" for his forthcoming edition of The Rape of the Lock. Shortly after publication the following January, engraved by Thomas Holloway, Fuseli's now lost oil sketch was exhibited at the Royal Academy; the exhibition catalogue includes ten lines from the poem. (Note: "The Goddess with a discontented Air..." (IV.79 ff.)) Printed to accompany Canto IV, the subject matter is perforce limited to that chapter; Fuseli's large-scale painting of the previous decade drew instead from the whole poem. Following the example set in this work in departing further from the text—indeed going "far beyond Pope's poem"—his students and disciples, among them Theodor von Holst and Lady Georgina North, went on to produce a succession of works based on The Rape of the Lock in which, "endowed with fecund imaginations and facile pencils they caught the spirit of the mock-epic far more sympathetically than the literal illustrators".

== History ==
In an article in the art journal Pantheon, pairing The Dream with The Nightmare, Harold D. Kalman dates the painting to the early 1780s, noting similarities between the two in subject matter, style, and size—The Dream of Belinda is half an inch smaller in both height and width, having been trimmed in an earlier restoration. Observing that around this time Fuseli was on friendly terms with one William Lock, Kalman tentatively suggests the commission as his. The very dark corner areas, painted black, may suggest the original frame had spandrels.

Exhibited at the Royal Academy in 1814, and rumoured to have once belonged to the Marquess of Cholmondeley, the work was acquired with the assistance of the Founders Fund by Vancouver Art Gallery in 1934 from Sir Charles Holmes, with nothing further being known about its provenance. At the time of its acquisition, the painting went by the name Queen Mab, based on a former understanding of its subject; more recently, in his 1973 catalogue raisonné Fuseli scholar Gert Schiff gave it the title Belindas Erwachen ("Belinda's Awakening"), while Peter Tomory treats it as a variant on The Cave of Spleen. The painting was exhibited at Portland Art Museum in 1967–8, the University of British Columbia Fine Arts Gallery in 1973, Hamburger Kunsthalle in 1974–5, the Tate Gallery and Musée du Petit Palais in 1975, Simon Fraser Art Gallery, Burnaby in 1981, and Art Gallery of Ontario in 1998.

== Description ==
"One of the most unexplored regions of art are dreams", Fuseli once posited, though perhaps neither here nor in his oeuvre more generally. As in another of his curtained scenes, a drawing of a subject from Milton's L'Allegro now in Auckland, there are four main figures—the slumbering Belinda, her guardian sylph Ariel, the gnome Umbriel, and, on the ground beneath a sheet, the covetous Baron. In his introduction to The Rape of the Lock, Alexander Pope gives an explanation of the Rosicrucians, whereby the four elements are inhabited by four spirits, namely Sylphs, Gnomes, Nymphs, and Salamanders—corresponding respectively to air, earth, water, and fire; completing the quartet is Belinda as nymph (Note: "rob'd in white, the Nymph intent adores / With Head uncover'd..." (I.123–4)) and the impassioned Baron as fire-Salamander. (Note: "With tender Billet-doux he lights the Pyre / Then prostrate falls" (II.42–3))

The pose of the main figure, the recumbent (Note: "Belinda still her downy Pillow prest" (I.19)) Belinda, is not unlike that of Michelangelo's Night, sketched by Fuseli in 1777, and perhaps even closer to the Sleeping Ariadne. Pink of cheek (Note: "That ev'n in slumber caus'd her Cheek to glow" (I.24)) with a crucifix round her neck, (Note: "On her white Breast a sparkling Cross she wore" (II.7)) the bright curtain (Note: "Sol through white Curtains" (I.13)) draws the eye to the area of her "vulnerable locks". Above her and descending to her well-populated boudoir, the position of her guardian sylph Ariel (Note: "the Sylphs contrive it all / Of these am I, who thy Protection claim / A watchful Sprite, and Ariel is my name" (I.104–6))—a named borrowed by Pope from The Tempest—is that of several of Fuseli's earlier representations of Shakespeare's Ariel, the earliest dating to 1774, and also close to his Shepherd's Dream, based on Paradise Lost. The "ambisexual" (Note: "Her guardian Sylph prolong'd the balmy rest / 'Twas he had summon'd to her silent Bed / The Morning Dream that hovere'd o'er her Head" (I.20–2)) Ariel presents her charge with a dressing table, the "compositional fulcrum" round which the four main figures rotate, on which lies, projecting forth over the edge, the letter inviting her to Hampton Court Belinda sees immediately upon awakening. (Note: "Thy Eyes first open'd on a Billet-doux" (I.118)) Also on the table for her toilette (Note: "the long Labours of the Toilet cease. / Belinda now..." (III.24–5)) are a crystal casket topped by a tiny owl, two earthenware containers for cosmetics, and a mirror, perhaps tokens of the vanity the ravishing of her lock affronts; the apparent crack in the mirror and the delicate vessels may refer to the fragility of her virtue, (Note: "Yet am not I the first mistasken Maid / by love of Courts to num'rous Ills betray'd...The tott'ring China shook without a Wind" (IV.151–2, 163)) victim of an incubus.

Foreshadowing the misfortune that is to befall her, crouched waiting at Belinda's feet, beneath a sheet upon which two moths or butterflies copulate, is the ignoble Baron, ready to spring forth and rape her lock. (Note: "In tasks so bold, can little Men engage" (I.11)) Further into the future, harbinger of the spleen that is to overtake her, the "sullen psychosomatic condition resulting from her tonsorial rape", is the careering gnome Umbriel, hurrying though the scene with a backwards gesture (Note: "Hear me, and touch Belinda with Chagrin" (IV.77)) on his descent to the Cave of Spleen, (Note: "For, that sad moment, when the Sylphs withdrew, / and Ariel weeping from Belinda flew, / Umbriel...Repair'd to search the gloomy Cave of Spleen" (IV.11–12,16)) known in the eighteenth century as the "English malady". A parody katabasis (descent into the underworld), Umbriel grasps in his hand a branch of spleenwort, (Note: "Safe past the Gnome through this fantastic Band, / a Branch of healing Spleenwort in his Hand" (IV.55–6)) counterpart to Aeneas' celebrated golden bough on his descent in the sixth book of the Aeneid. Umbriel's head is garlanded—or strewn—with arrow-shaped leaves, like those of the fern-like spleenwort. Paintings by Fuseli of Puck from A Midsummer Night's Dream are similar in body-type, facial expression, and attitude.

Completing the cast are a swooping figure with arms outstretched, almost identical to a figure in Fuseli's mid-1780s Cobweb (after the fairy in A Midsummer Night's Dream), perhaps another mischievous gnome or sprite; just above, and scarcely visible, a dancing woman in a broad hat; and, at Umbriel's feet, two diminutive female figures, one smiling, one scowling, representing in turn the benevolent and malevolent aspects of Queen Mab from Romeo and Juliet, with the former, the bringer of good dreams, better dressed, having a nobler countenance, and a half-moon upon her head, in a folk-fusion of Mab with Diana; it is "as though the freight of symbols in Pope's couplets was too slight". Found also in Fuseli's 1780s drawing Sleeping Woman with a Cupid, where the subject perhaps suggests the sleep of reason, a further large lepidopteran (Note: "Dried Butterflies..." (V.122)) beneath Umbriel's back foot may reinforce the connection with erotic dreams inhabited by the Toggeli or incubi of Swiss folklore.

== Gallery of related images ==
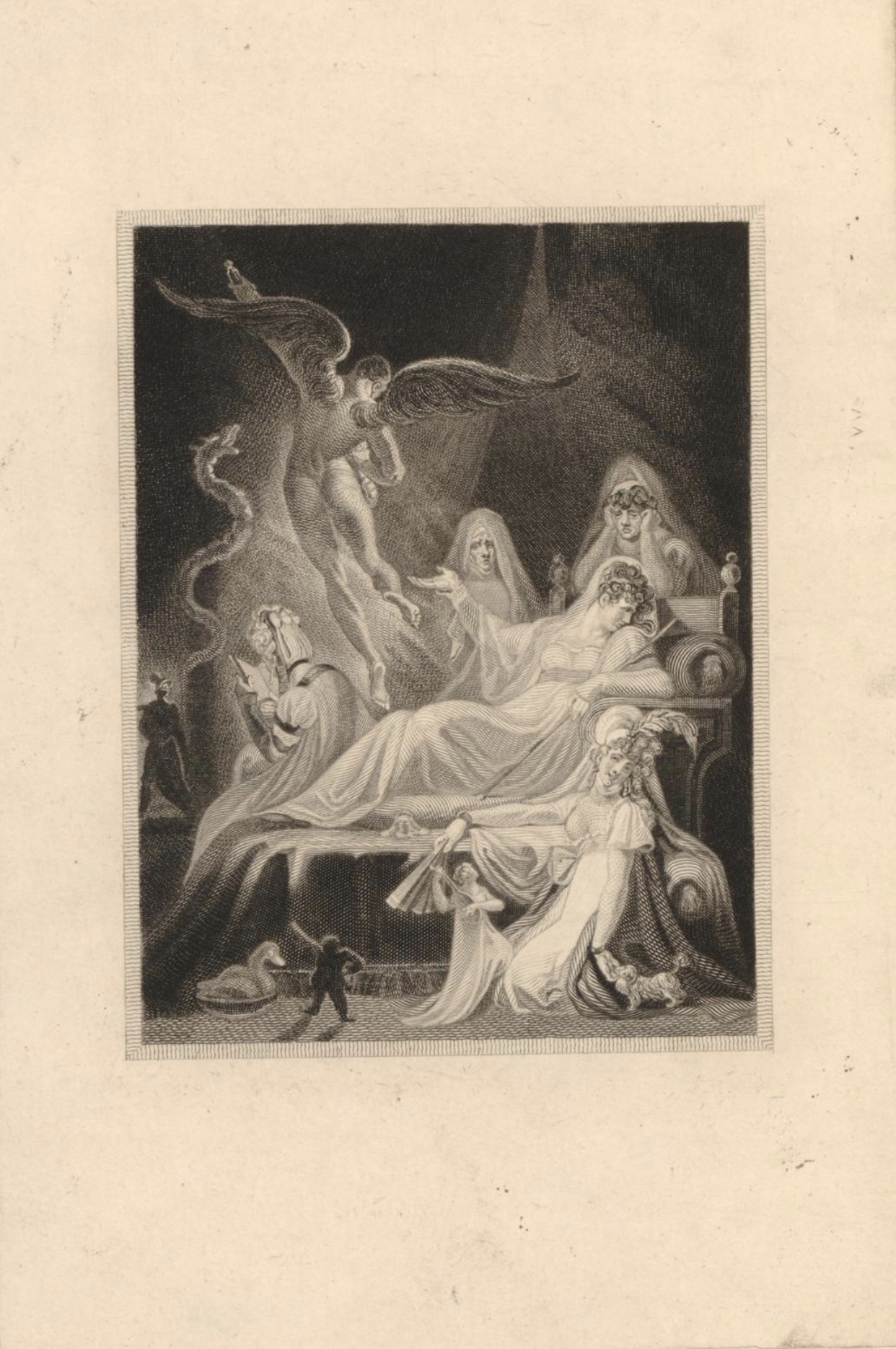
The Cave of Spleen, 1798 print after Fuseli by Thomas Holloway (British Museum)

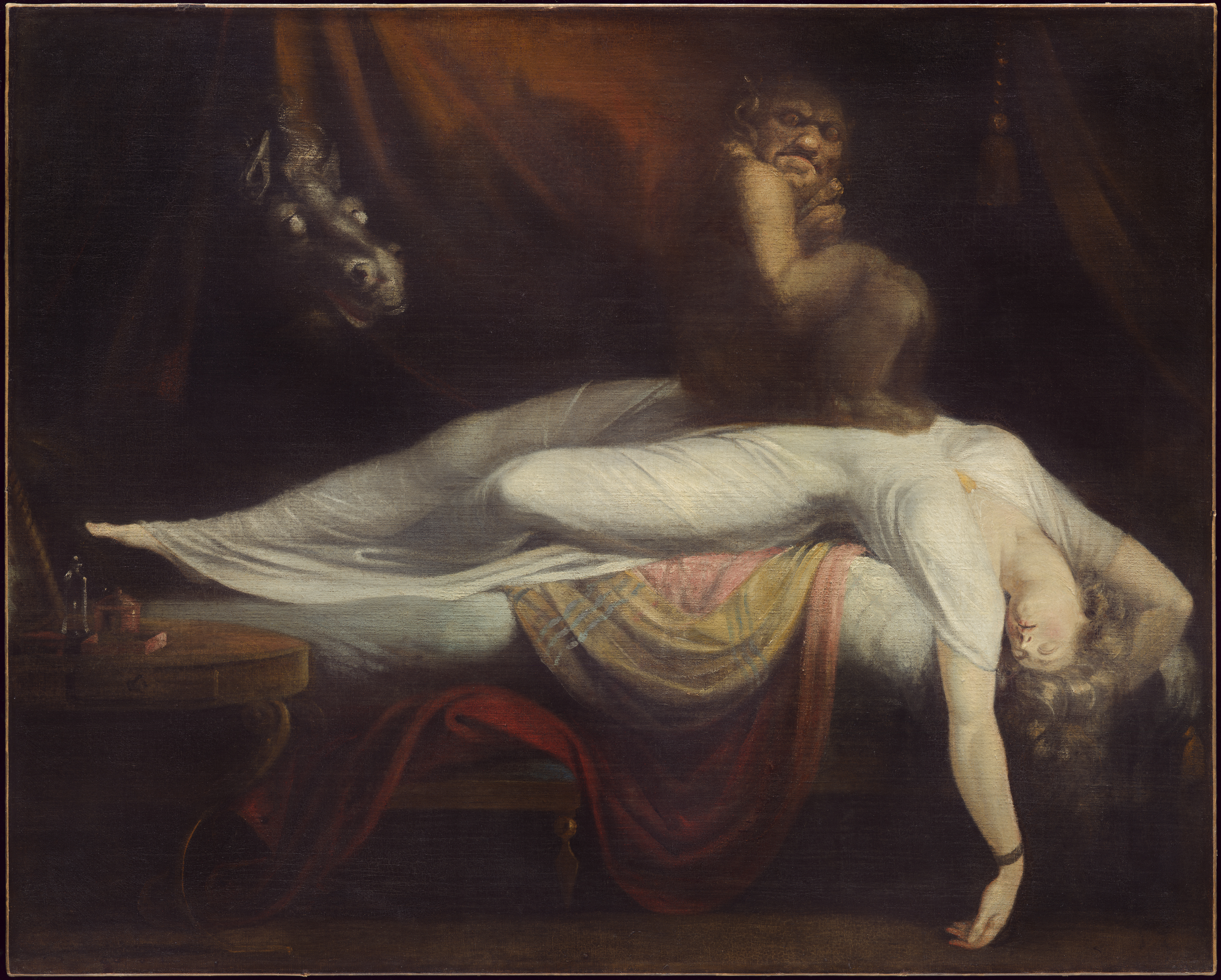
The Nightmare (1781), with curtain, the night-mare, and an incubus
(Detroit Institute of Arts)

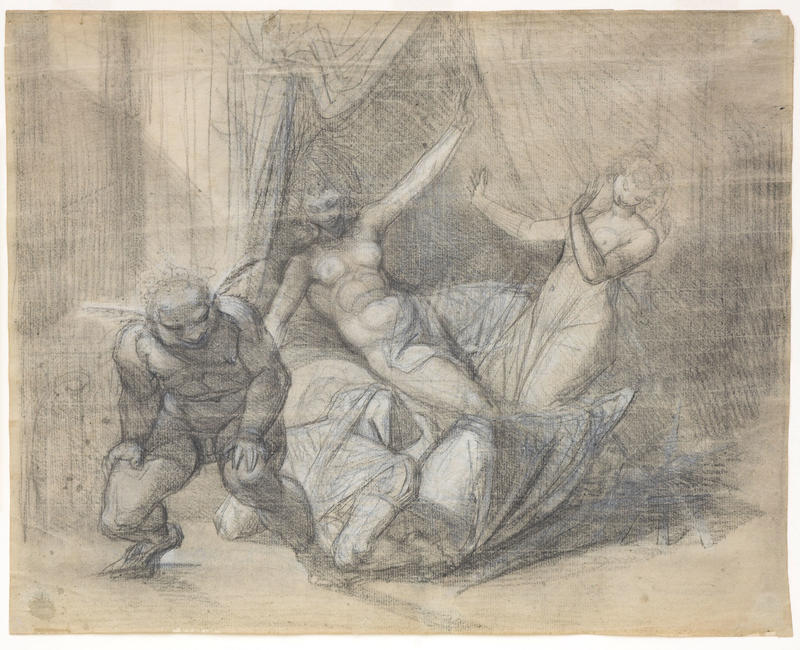
Subject from Milton's L'Allegro (c. 1780–1785), with curtain and 4 figures
(Auckland Art Gallery)

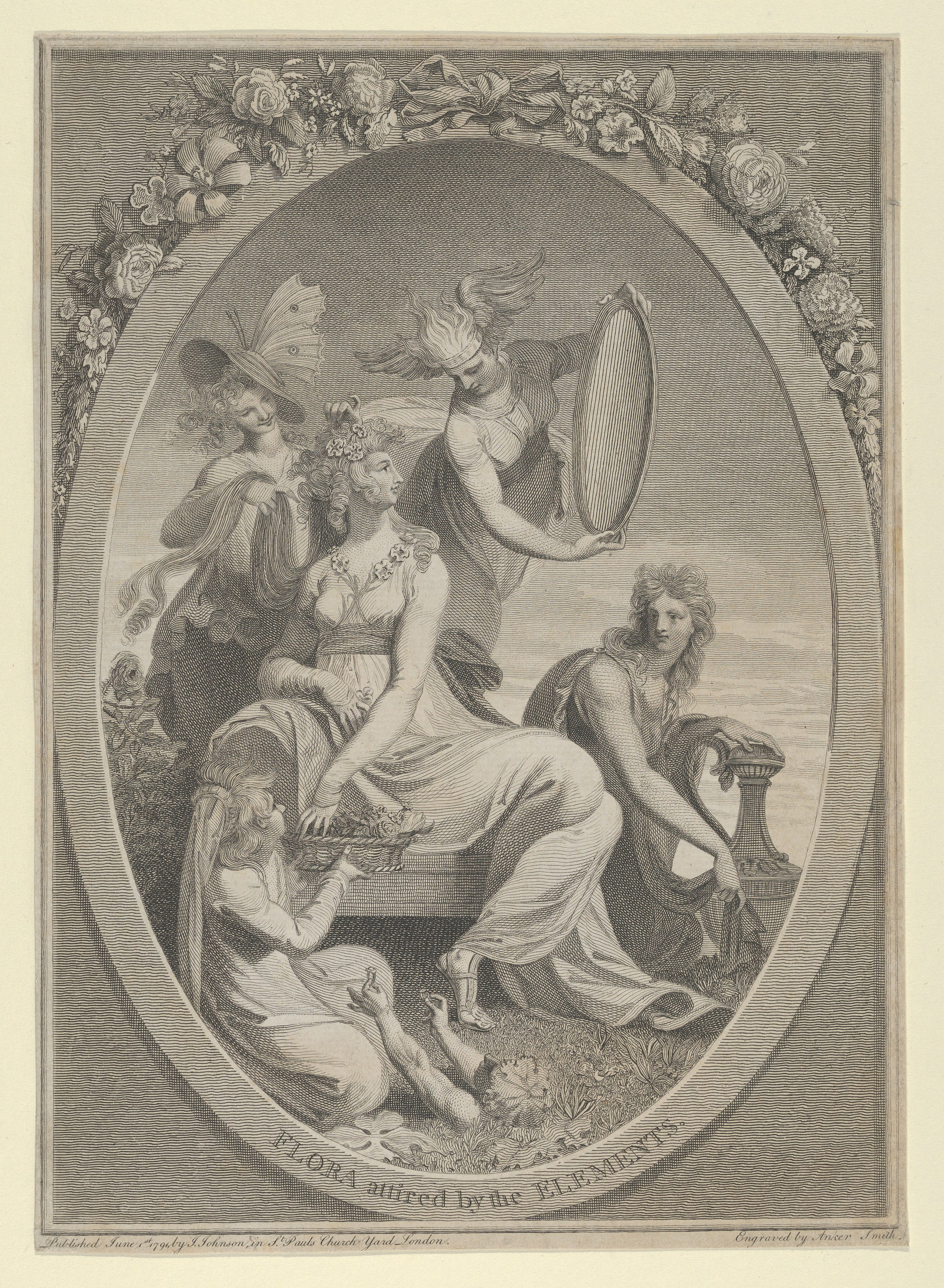
Frontispiece with the four elements for his friend Erasmus Darwin's 1791 Economy of Vegetation

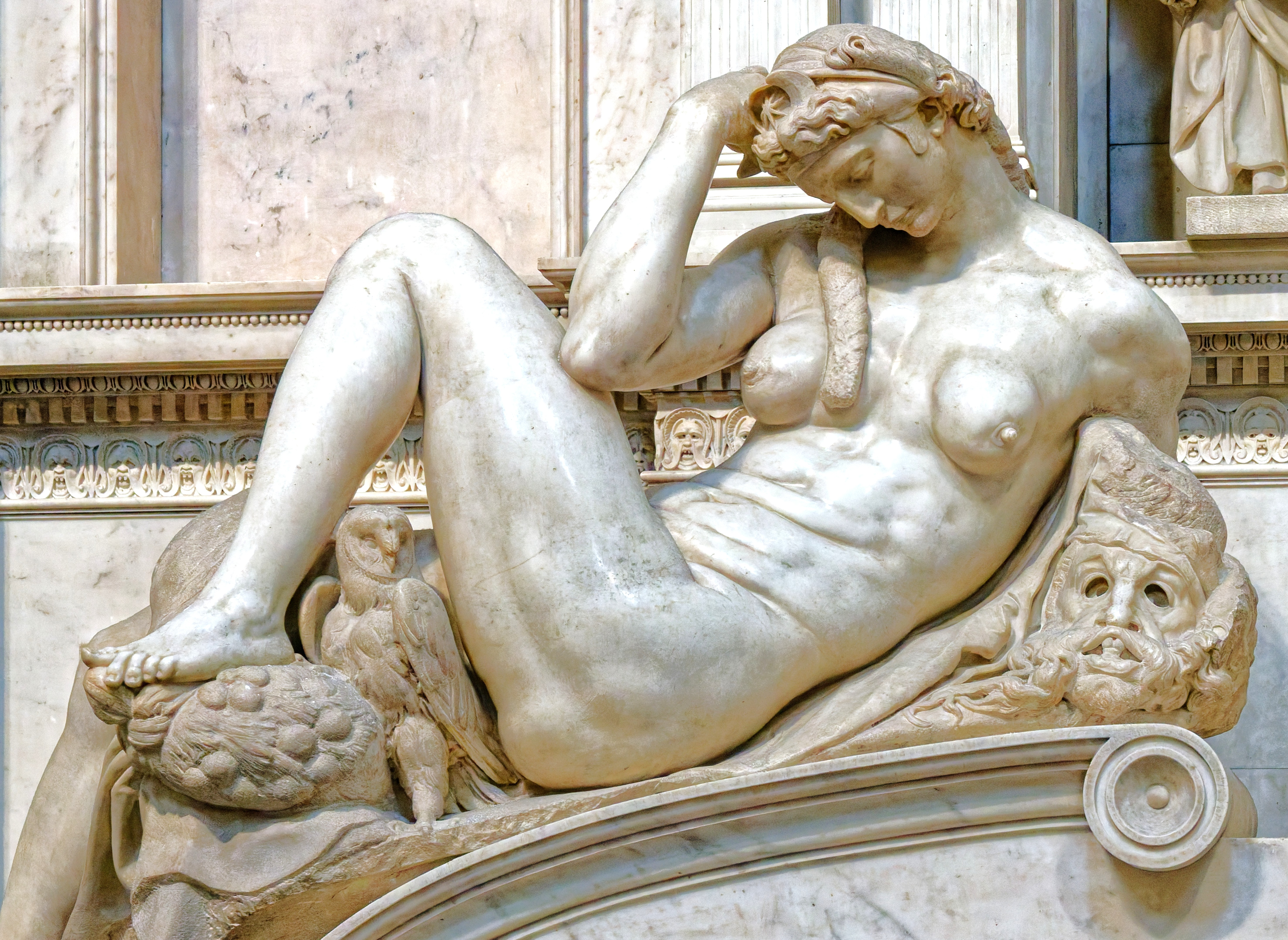
Michelangelo's Night (Sagrestia Nuova)

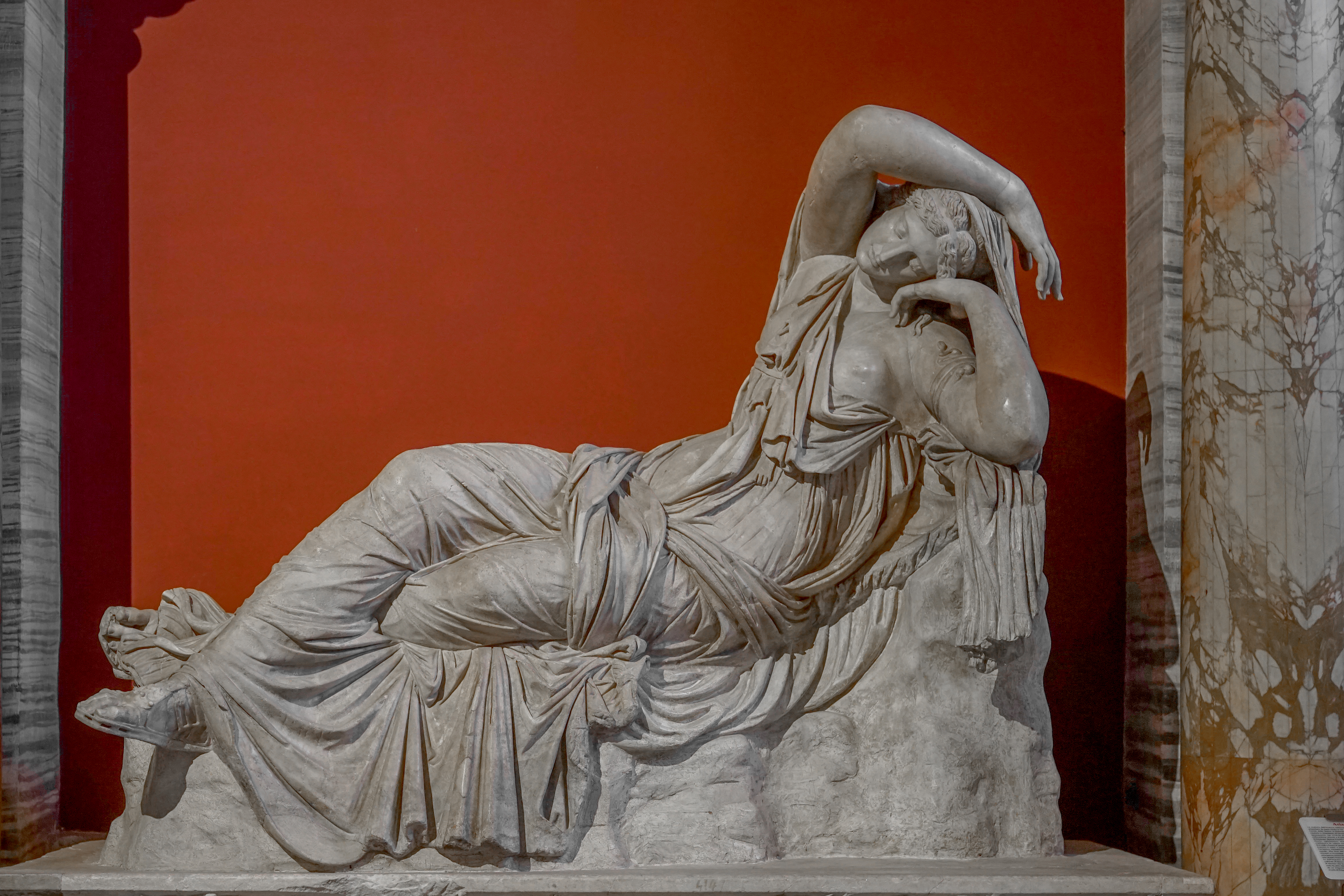
Sleeping Ariadne (Vatican Museums)

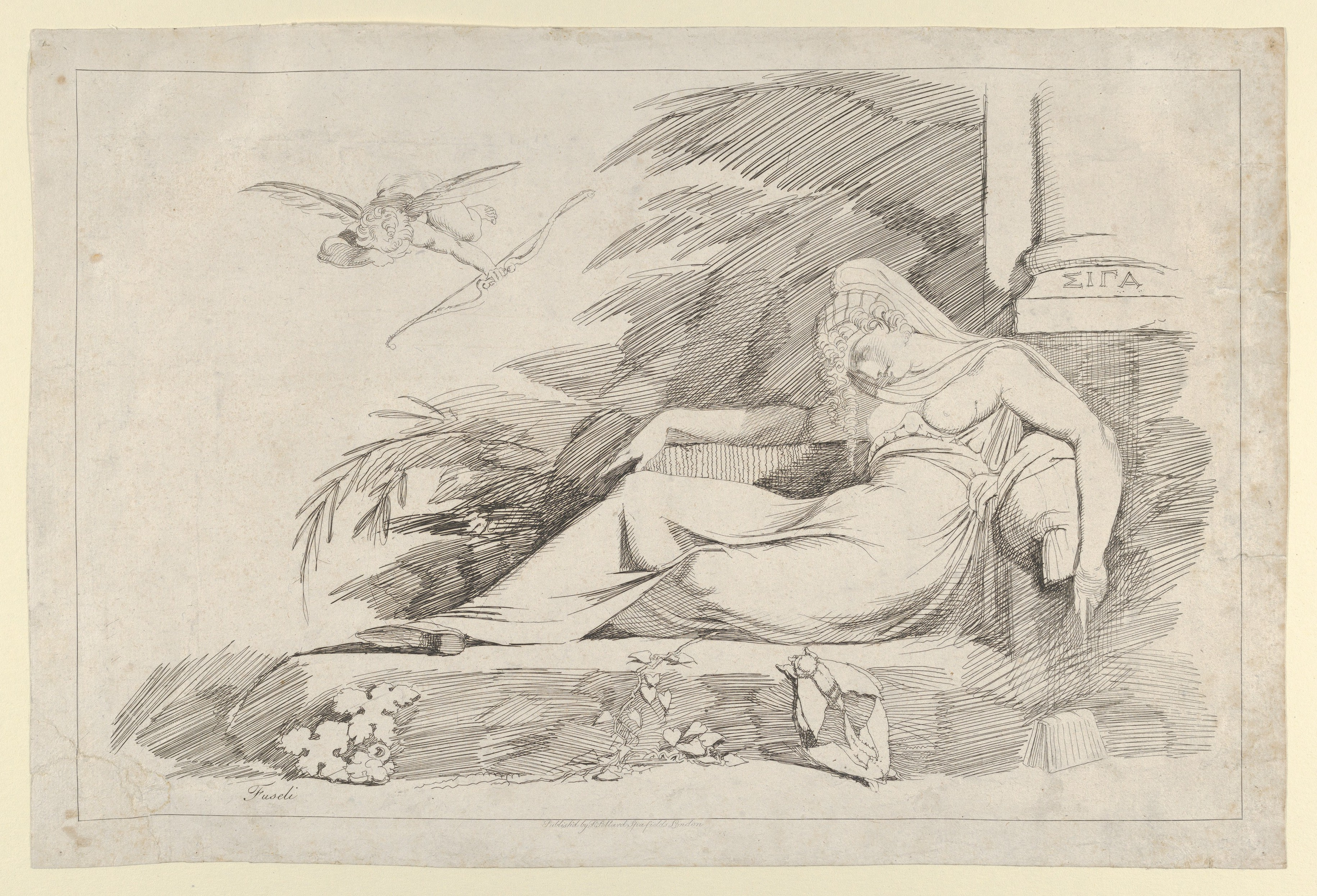
Sleeping Woman with a Cupid, 1780–90 print (Metropolitan Museum of Art; drawing in the Kunstmuseum Basel)

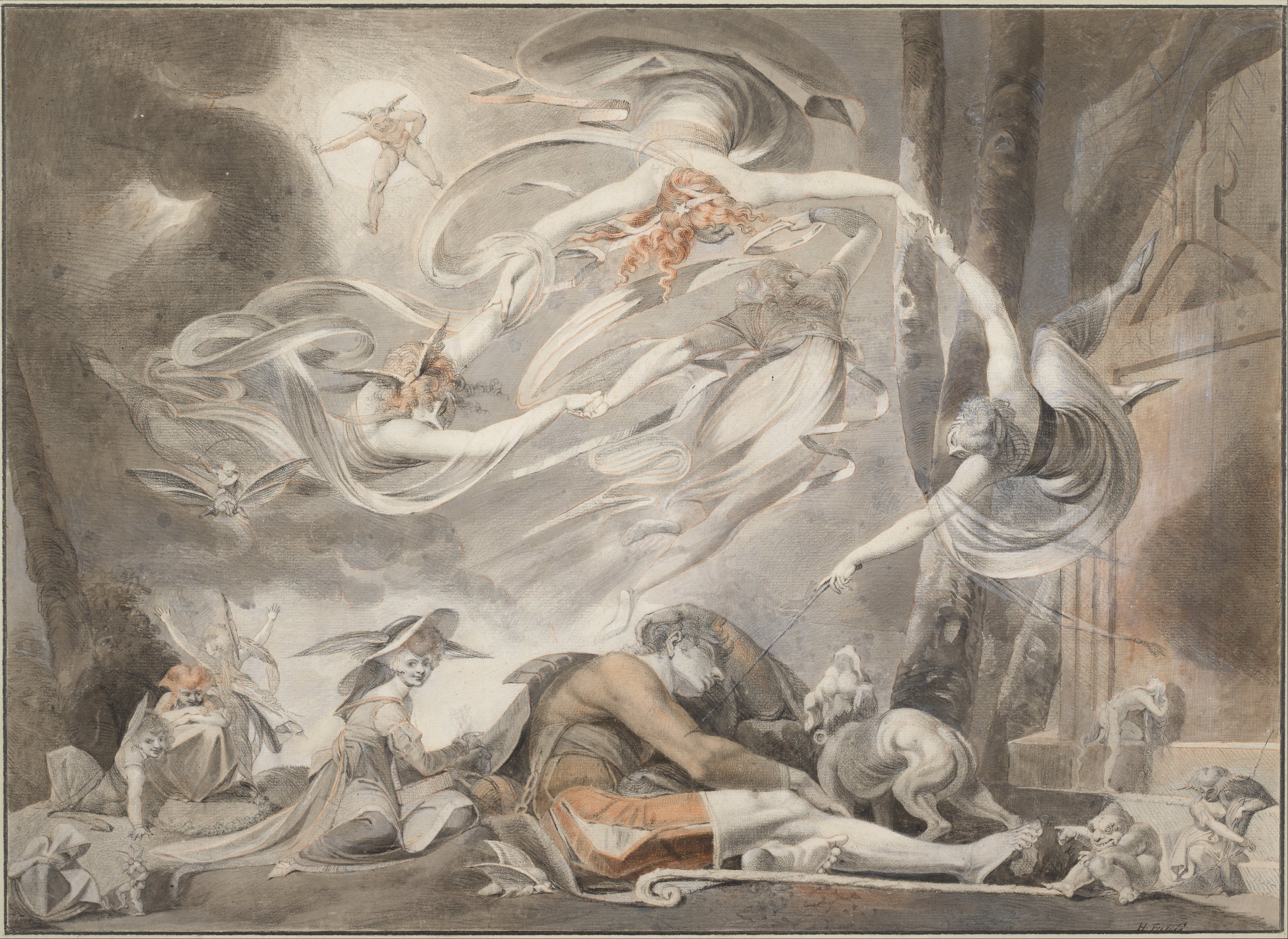
The Shepherd's Dream (1786), "fairy elves" swirling overhead
(Albertina)

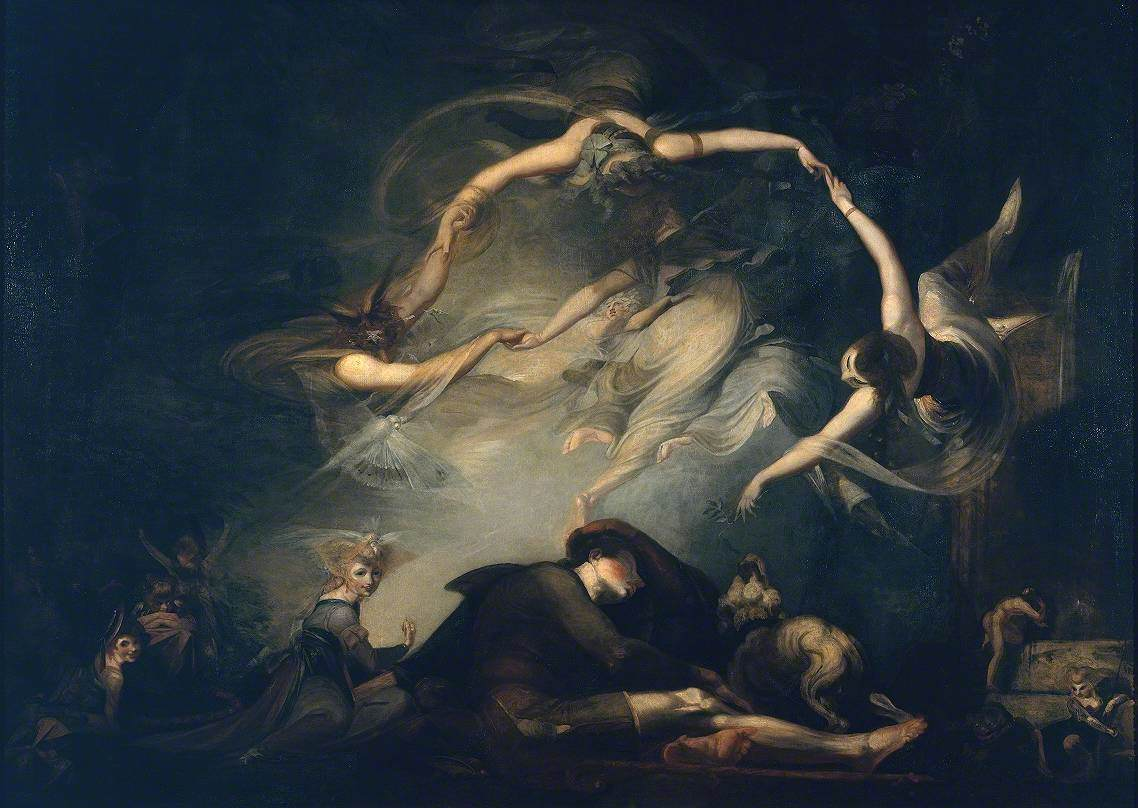
The Shepherd's Dream (1793)
(Tate)

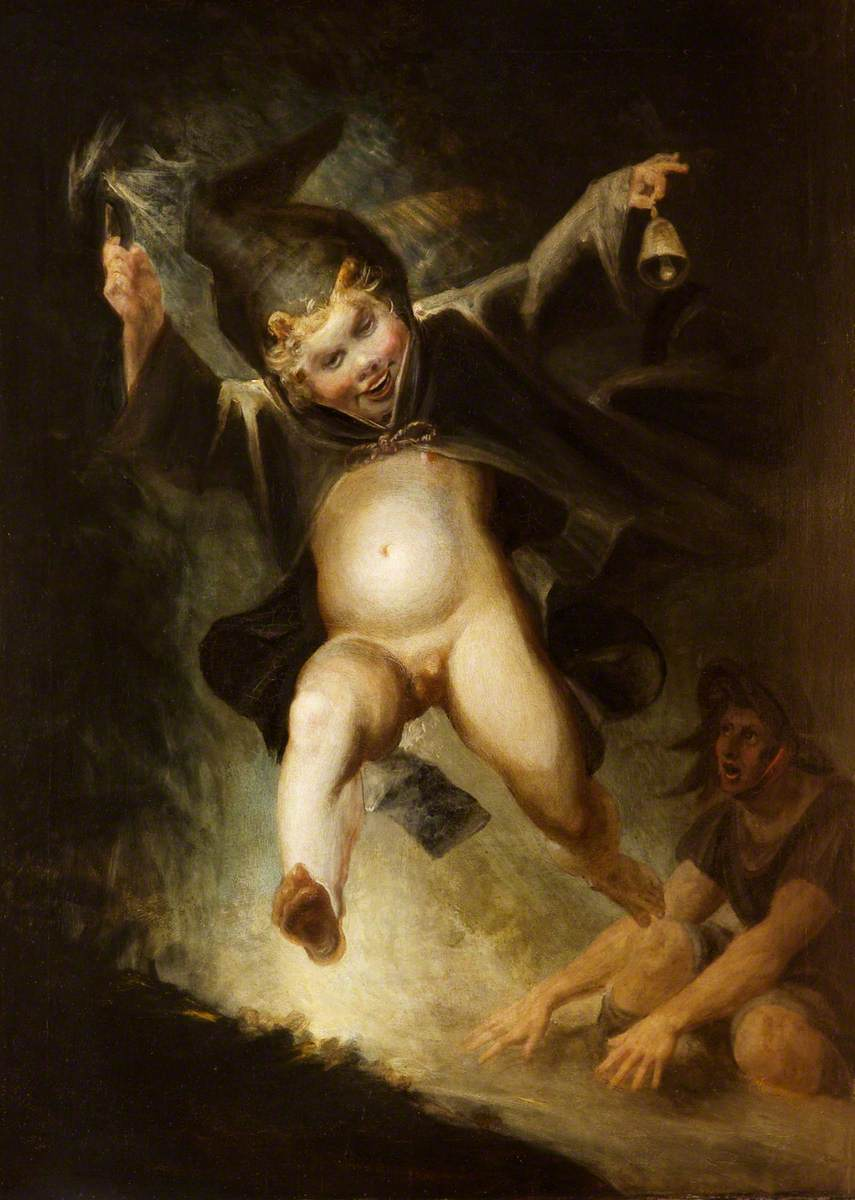
Friar Puck
(Tabley House)

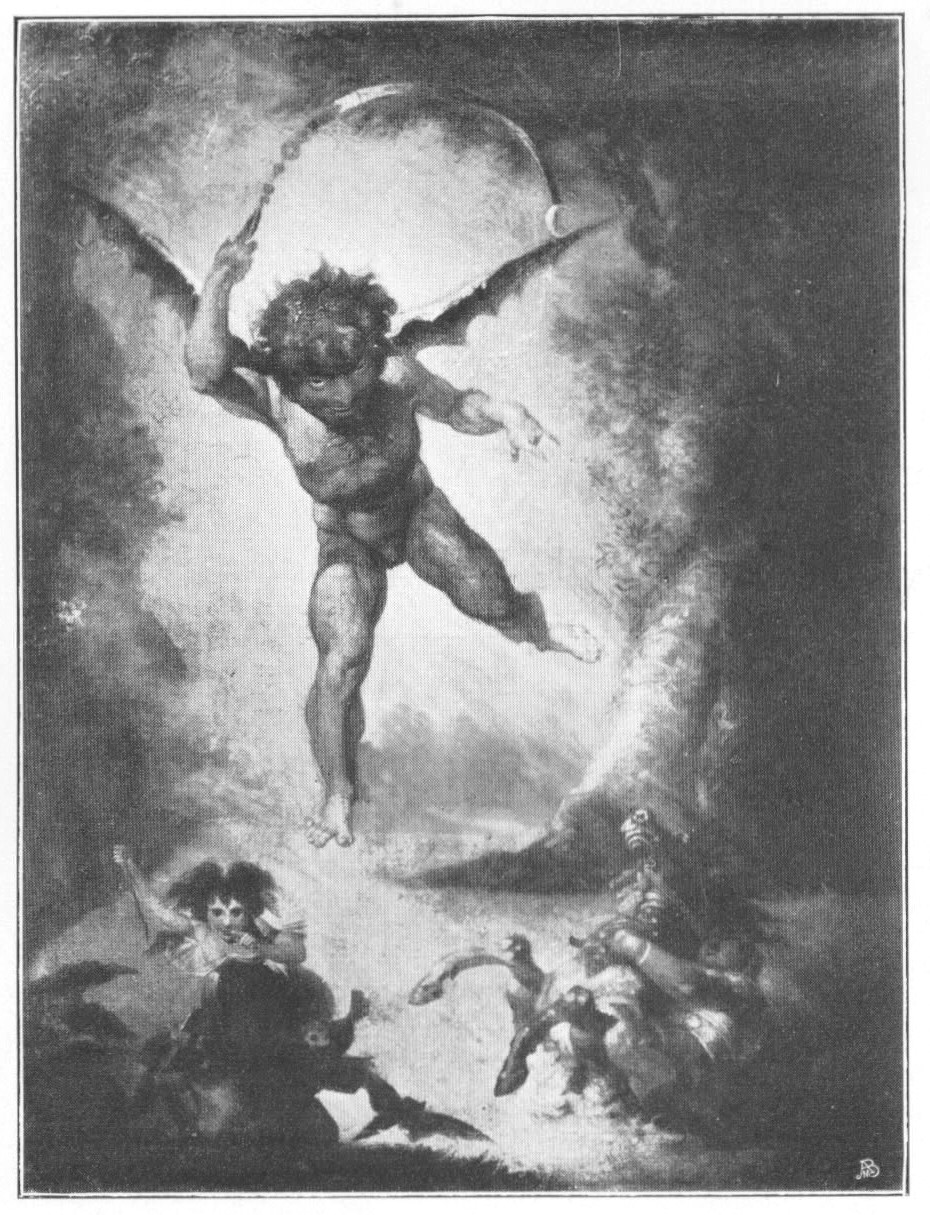
Puck
(whereabouts unknown)

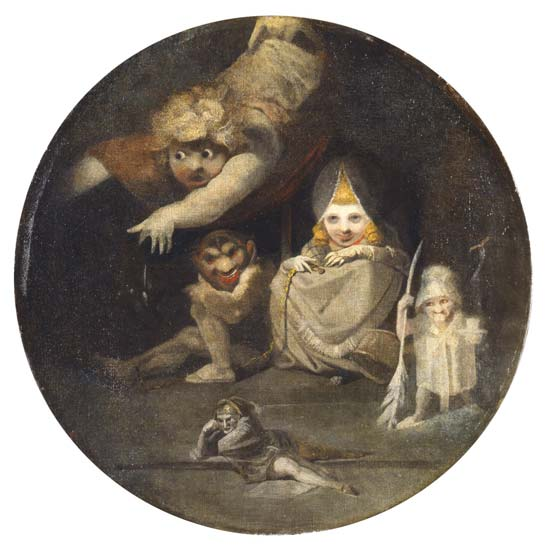
Cobweb (mid-1780s) (private collection)

== See also ==
- Ut pictura poesis
