= List of literary rewriters =

Some writers have produced more than one version of a story, novel, verse, or drama. This is a list of notable instances.

== List ==
- Alexander Pope (1688–1744) "revised and amplified his works, producing multiple versions of ... the same composition... Which text is the best to include... in [an] edition? The Rape of the Lock was first published anonymously in 1712 in a miscellaneous collection of works by various hands. Two years later it appeared as a separate publication under Pope's own name, having expanded from its original two cantos into five. For its inclusion in the 1717 Works Pope made further changes and the major addition of Clarissa's ... speech to Belinda... The Rape of the Lock [was, writes Henry Power,] 'substantially reshaped' after its initial publication, to the extent that it became a new text..."
- Mary Shelley (1797–1851) published her novel Frankenstein; or, The Modern Prometheus anonymously in 1818; and in 1831, under her name, a substantially new text, stripped of much of its context, removing a number of references to contemporary science and to her father's (William Godwin's) philosophy.
- Edward FitzGerald (1809–1883) in his lifetime published four distinct versions of his Rubaiyat of Omar Khayyam—in 1859 (75 quatrains), 1868 (110 quatrains), 1872 (101 quatrains), 1879 (101 quatrains).

== See also ==
- Editing
- Literature
- Writing

== Bibliography ==
- Freya Johnston, "Wants, Frailties, Passions" (review of Henry Power, ed., Alexander Pope: The Major Works, Oxford University Press, 2026, 840 pp., ISBN 978 0 19 886785 2), London Review of Books, vol. 48, no. 18 (8 October 2026), pp 15–18.
- D. L. Macdonald and Kathleen Scherf, "A Note on the Text", Frankenstein, 2nd ed., Peterborough, Broadview Press, 1999.
- Ambrose George Potter, A Bibliography of the Rubaiyat of Omar Khayyam, 1929.
