= Wokolo (crater) =

Wokolo is the largest crater on Umbriel, an Uranian Moon

Its coordinates are 30°S 1.8°E. it is 210 km in diameter

It was named after a demon from the Bambara people of southern Mali, Ivory Coast, Guinea, Burkina Faso and Senegal in 1988.
