= Vuver (crater) =

Crater on Umbriel

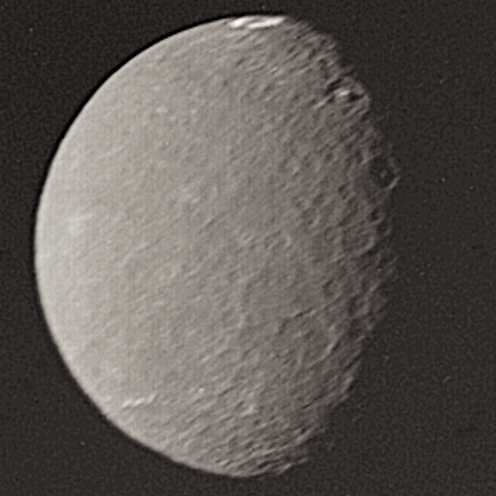
- Vuver with bright central peak as seen along the terminator (near 1 o'clock) on Umbriel
- Feature type: Impact crater
- Location: Ceres
- Coordinates: 4.70°S 311.60°E
- Diameter: 98 km
- Eponym: Orang Asli spirit

Vuver is a crater on the surface of Uranus' moon Umbriel. It is estimated to be 98 km in diameter. The longitude and latitude of its center are 311.6° and −4.7°, respectively.

Vuver has a distinct, bright central peak, which is one of the few bright albedo features on Umbriel that noticeably stands out against Umbriel's low albedo.

The crater is named after Vuver, a Mari evil spirit.
