= The Rape of the Lock =

1712 mock-heroic poem by Alexander Pope

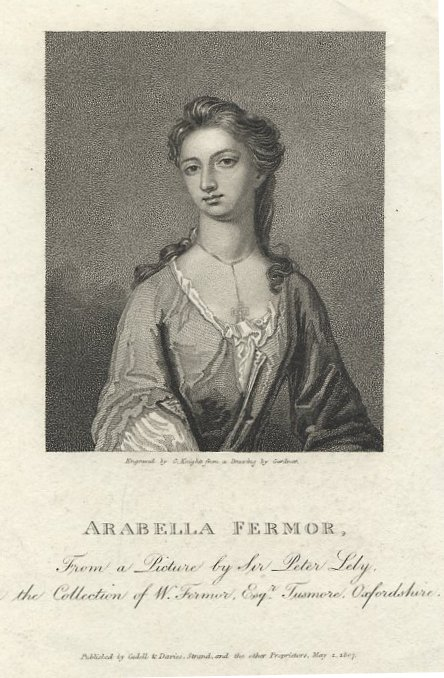
Arabella Fermor, a 19th-century print after Sir Peter Lely's portrait of her

The Rape of the Lock (Note: Here the word "rape" is used in the archaic meaning of "to snatch", "to plunder".) is a mock-heroic narrative poem written by Alexander Pope. One of the most commonly cited examples of high burlesque, it was first published anonymously in Lintot's Miscellaneous Poems and Translations (May 1712) in two cantos (334 lines); a revised edition "Written by Mr. Pope" followed in March 1714 as a five-canto version (794 lines) accompanied by six engravings. Pope boasted that this sold more than three thousand copies in its first four days. The final form of the poem appeared in 1717 with the addition of Clarissa's speech on good humour. The poem was much translated and contributed to the growing popularity of mock-heroic in Europe.

== Description ==
The poem of The Rape of the Lock satirises a minor incident of life, by comparing it to the epic world of the gods, and is based on an event recounted to Alexander Pope by his friend John Caryll. Arabella Fermor and her suitor, Lord Petre, were each a member of aristocratic recusant Catholic families, at a time in England when, under such laws as the Test Act, all denominations except Anglicanism suffered legal restrictions and penalties. (For example, Petre, being a Catholic, could not take the place in the House of Lords that would otherwise have been his.) Petre had cut off a lock of Arabella's hair without permission, and the consequent argument had created a breach between the two families. The poem's title does not refer to the extreme of sexual rape, but to an earlier definition of the word derived from the Latin rapere, "to snatch, to grab, to carry off"—in this case, the theft and carrying away of a lock of hair. In terms of the sensibilities of the age, however, even this non-consensual personal invasion might be interpreted as bringing loss of reputation and dishonour.

Pope, also a Catholic, wrote the poem at the request of friends in an attempt to "comically merge the two" worlds, the heroic with the social. He utilised the character Belinda to represent Arabella and introduced an entire system of "sylphs", or guardian spirits of virgins, a parodised version of the gods and goddesses of conventional epic. Pope derived his sylphs from the 17th-century French Rosicrucian novel Comte de Gabalis. Pope, writing pseudonymously as Esdras Barnivelt, also published A Key to the Lock in 1714 as a humorous warning against taking the poem too seriously.

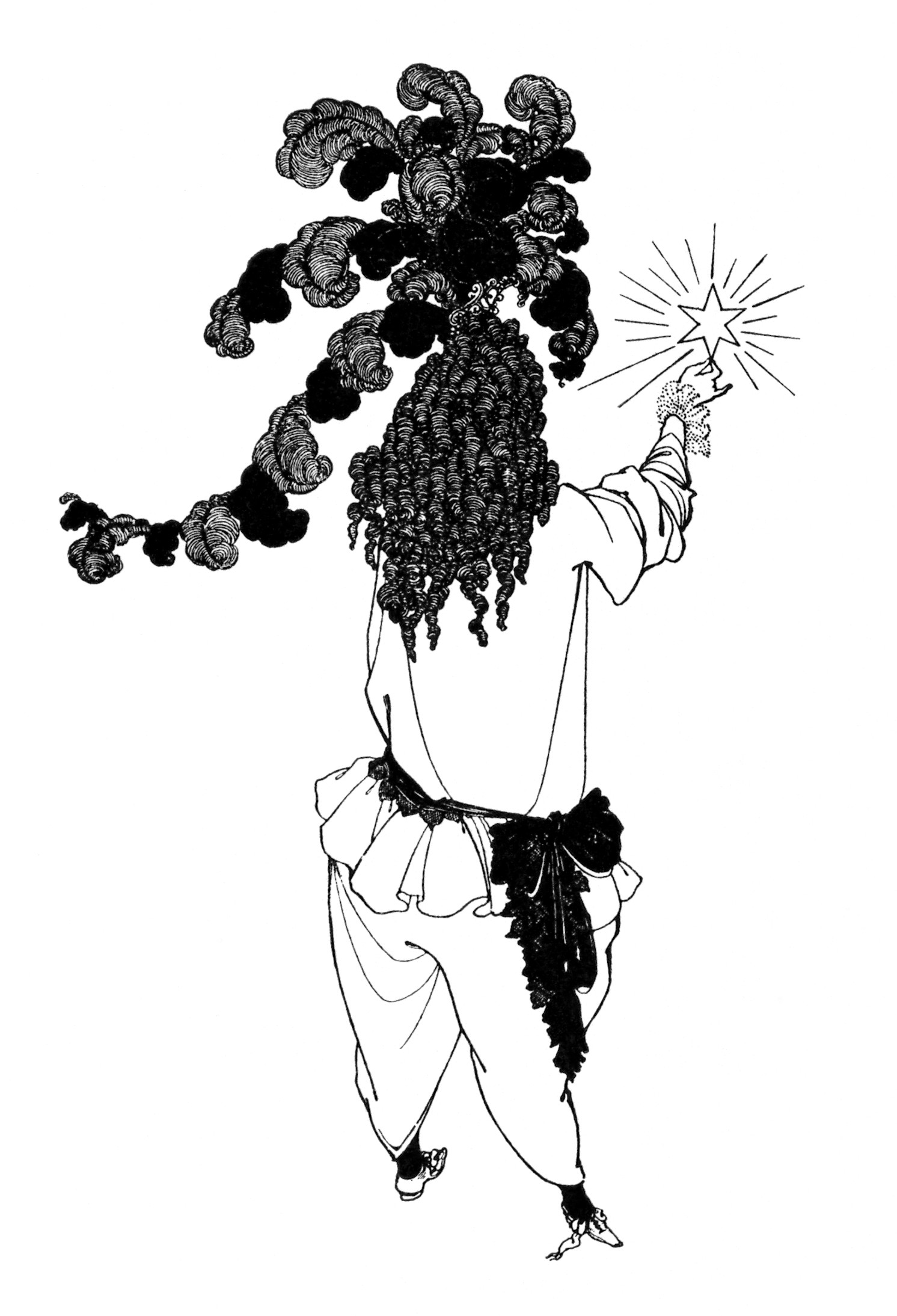
"The New Star", illustration by Aubrey Beardsley for The Rape of the Lock

Pope's poem uses the traditional high stature of classical epics to emphasise the triviality of the incident. The abduction of Helen of Troy becomes here the theft of a lock of hair; the gods become minute sylphs; the description of Achilles' shield becomes an excursus on one of Belinda's petticoats. He also uses the epic style of invocations, lamentations, exclamations and similes, and in some cases adds parody to imitation by following the framework of actual speeches in Homer's Iliad. Although the poem is humorous at times, Pope keeps a sense that beauty is fragile, and emphasises that the loss of a lock of hair touches Belinda deeply.

The humour of the poem comes from the storm in a teacup being couched within the elaborate, formal verbal structure of an epic poem. It is a satire on contemporary society which showcases the lifestyle led by some people of that age. Pope arguably satirises it from within rather than looking down judgementally on the characters. Belinda's legitimate rage is thus alleviated and tempered by her good humour, as directed by the character Clarissa.

== Dedicatory letter ==
In the second edition Pope added a dedicatory letter to Mrs. Arabella Fermor:

Madam,

It will be in vain to deny that I have some regard for this piece, since I dedicate it to You. Yet you may bear me witness, it was intended only to divert a few young Ladies, who have good sense and good humour enough to laugh not only at their sex's little unguarded follies, but at their own. But as it was communicated with the air of a secret, it soon found its way into the world. An imperfect copy having been offered to a Bookseller, you had the good nature for my sake to consent to the publication of one more correct: This I was forced to, before I had executed half my design, for the Machinery was entirely wanting to complete it.

The Machinery, Madam, is a term invented by the Critics, to signify that part which the Deities, Angels, or Dæmons are made to act in a poem: For the ancient poets are in one respect like many modern ladies: let an action be never so trivial in itself, they always make it appear of the utmost importance. These Machines I determined to raise on a very new and odd foundation, the Rosicrucian doctrine of Spirits.

I know how disagreeable it is to make use of hard words before a lady; but 'tis so much the concern of a poet to have his works understood and particularly by your sex, that you must give me leave to explain two or three difficult terms.

The Rosicrucians are the people I must bring you acquainted with. The best account I know of them is in a French book called Le Comte de Gabalis, which both in its title and size is so like a novel, that many of the fair sex have read it for one by mistake. According to these gentlemen, the four elements are inhabited by spirits, which they call Sylphs, Gnomes, Nymphs, and Salamanders. The Gnomes or Dæmons of Earth delight in mischief; but the Sylphs, whose habitation is in the air, are the best-conditioned creatures imaginable. For they say, any mortals may enjoy the most intimate familiarities with these gentle spirits, upon a condition very easy to all true adepts, an inviolate preservation of Chastity.

As to the following Cantos, all the passages of them are as fabulous as the Vision at the beginning or the Transformation at the end; (except the loss of your Hair, which I always mention with reverence). The human persons are as fictitious as the airy ones, and the character of Belinda, as it is now managed, resembles you in nothing but in Beauty.

== Summary ==
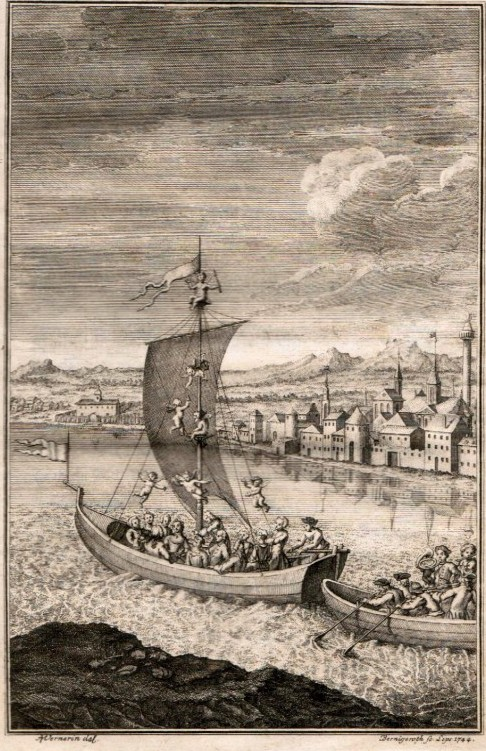
Belinda sails down the Thames to Hampton Court attended by sylphs; a copperplate engraving by Anna Maria Werner (1744).

In the beginning of this mock-epic, Pope declares that a "dire offence" (Canto 1 line 1) has been committed. A lord has assaulted a "gentle belle" (line 8), causing her to reject him. He then proceeds to tell the story of this offence.

While Belinda is still asleep, her guardian Sylph Ariel forewarns her that "some dread event impends". Belinda then awakes and gets ready for the day with the help of her maid, Betty. The Sylphs, though unseen, also contribute: "These set the head, and those divide the hair, some fold the sleeve, whilst others plait the gown" (146–147). Here Pope also describes Belinda's two locks of hair "which graceful hung behind". The Baron, one of Belinda's suitors, greatly admires these locks and conspires to steal one. Building an altar, he places on it "all the trophies of his former loves" (line 40), sets them on fire and fervently prays "soon to obtain, and long possess" (line 44) the lock.

Ariel, disturbed by the impending event although not knowing what it will be, summons many sylphs to her and instructs them to guard Belinda from anything that may befall her, whether she "forget her prayers, or miss a masquerade, or lost her heart, or necklace, at a ball" (line 108–109). So protected, Belinda arrives at Hampton Court and is invited to play a game of ombre.

The conspiring Baron acquires a pair of scissors and tries to snip off one of her locks, but he is prevented by the watchful Sylphs. This happens three times, but in the end the Baron succeeds (also cutting a Sylph in two, though Pope reassures the reader, parodying a passage in Paradise Lost, that "airy substance soon unites again" [line 152]). When Belinda discovers her lock is gone, she falls into a tantrum, while the Baron celebrates his victory.

A gnome named Umbriel now journeys to the Cave of Spleen and from the Queen receives a bag of "sighs, sobs, and passions, and the war of tongues" (canto 4 line 84) and a vial filled "with fainting fears, soft sorrows, melting griefs, and flowing tears" (line 85–86) and brings them to Belinda. Finding her dejected in the arms of the woman Thalestris, Umbriel pours the contents over them both.

Many people, moved by Belinda's grief, demand the lock back, but the Baron is unrepentant and refuses. Clarissa admonishes them to keep their good humour, but they will not listen and instead a battle ensues with glares, songs and wits as weapons. Belinda fights with the Baron and throws snuff up his nose to subdue him. When she demands that he restore the lock, however, it is nowhere to be found. It has been made a constellation and is destined to outlast the contestants.

== The Rape of the Bucket ==
Pope was familiar with John Ozell's English-language translation (made in 1710) of Alessandro Tassoni's early 17th-century Italian mock-heroic poem La secchia rapita (The Trophy Bucket). Although Ozell and Pope belonged to different political factions and later exchanged bitter insults, the publication of Ozell's translation of a pioneering Italian mock-heroic poem shortly before the appearance of The Rape of the Lock led to the supposition that it could have influenced Pope's poem. Pope's original two-canto version was published anonymously in 1712. Following the success of Pope's expanded five-canto version of The Rape of the Lock in 1714, Ozell's publisher Edmund Curll seized the opportunity to profit from its popularity by retitling his translation The Rape of the Bucket in a 1715 "second edition".

It is generally acknowledged that Tassoni's poema eroicomico was the model for Boileau's Le Lutrin (The Lectern, 1674–83). Both deflate an epic struggle to the size of a petty domestic squabble, but where Tassoni starts with an actual war and gives it an ignoble cause, Boileau begins with the trifling cause and compares it humorously with a Classical conflict. Narration of "What mighty contests rise from trivial things" is also Pope's method in The Rape of the Lock, and Boileau's work has been seen in its turn as Pope's model. The appearance of Ozell's translation of Tassoni's work in 1710, prior to The Rape of the Lock, has led to the perception of a more direct connection between these two mock-heroic poems (reinforced by Curll's opportunistic retitling of Ozell's translation).

Introducing his 1825 translation of the whole of Tassoni's The Rape of the Bucket, James Atkinson compared the three mock-heroic poems (in Italian, French and English). He believed that "there is little of similarity among them... The Secchia Rapita indeed differs essentially from the Rape of the Lock, both in spirit, and execution. There is nothing in the latter that can be compared with the humour of the former, or with the admirably grotesque pictures with which it abounds".

== Translations ==
Translations of Pope's poem into French, Italian and German were all made in the first half of the 18th century. Others in those languages followed later, as well as in Dutch, Czech, Estonian, Hungarian, Polish, Swedish and Danish. The work had originally come to European notice through an anonymous prose version, La Boucle de Cheveux Enlevée, published anonymously in 1728 and now ascribed either to Marthe-Marguerite, Marquise de Caylus, or to Pierre Desfontaines. Despite there being a playful French model for this kind of writing in Boileau's Lutrin, the translator claims of Pope's work in the preface that "I do not believe that there can be found in our language anything more ingenious, in this playful genre." A verse translation by Jean-François Marmontel followed in 1746.

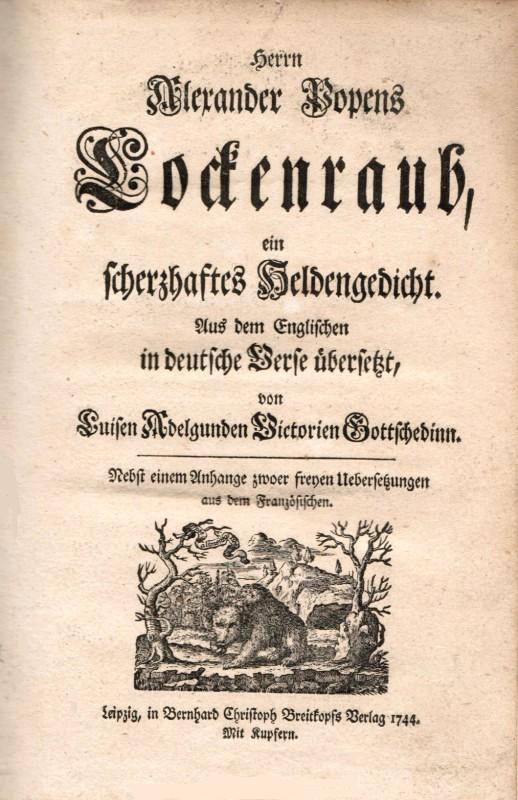
Der Lockenraub, the 1744 German translation of Pope's poem by Luise Gottsched

The first German translation, Der merckwürdige Haar-Locken-Raub (1739), was a rendering of the French prose version of 1728. Luise Gottsched's verse translation, Der Lockenraub, was begun in the 1730s, again using a French prose version. However, she revised it totally once she managed to obtain the original text in English and in this way pioneered an interest in English literature in the German-language area. From then on, "Pope became very popular as a model for German poets from the 1750s onwards and remained an important source of inspiration throughout the second half of the 18th century," and in particular as a model for mock heroic poetry.

Early Italian verse translations of the poem include Andrea Bonducci's Il Riccio Rapito (Florence 1739), followed by Antonio Schinella Conti's version, begun much earlier and finally published in Venice in 1751. The vogue for Pope's work went on to blossom at the start of the 19th century with separate translations by Federico Federici (Faziola 1819), Vincenzo Benini (Milan 1819), Sansone Uzielli (Livorno 1822), and Antonio Beduschi (Milan 1830).

Scandinavian versions appeared near the start of the 19th century, beginning with the Swedish Våldet på Belindas låck (Stockholm, 1797) by Johan Lorens Odhelius (1737–1816). It was followed in 1819 by Den bortröfvade hårlocken by Jonas Magnus Stjernstolpe (1777–1831), and by the Danish imitation Belinde, eller den røvede Haarlok by Anton Martini (1773–1847) in 1829.

== Parody and interpretation ==
In 1717 Giles Jacob published his bawdy parody, The Rape of the Smock, the plot of which turns on voyeurism and enforced seduction, building on erotic undertones present in Pope's poem which were to be taken up by its illustrators, and reached an apotheosis in Aubrey Beardsley's work.

The 1714 edition of The Rape of the Lock and those that followed from Lintot's press had come with six woodcuts designed by Louis Du Guernier. Although the work of this artist has been described as unimaginative, he goes beyond his literal brief in making Belinda sleep in unwarranted décolletage in the first canto, while in the second giving the "painted vessel" on its way down the Thames the tilted perspective of the Ship of Fools. Furthermore, Du Guernier's frontispiece owes its iconography to a print by Étienne Baudet after a painting by Francesco Albani of Venus at her Toilette, making for an identification of Belinda with the goddess.

The German translation of the poem published from Leipzig in 1744 had five copperplate engravings by Anna Maria Werner (1689–1753), the court painter of Saxony. It has been observed, however, that the places they depict are not specifically English and that the scene of the game of ombre in Canto 3 is "clearly based on a Leipzig coffee-house", complete with lapdogs tumbling on the floor.

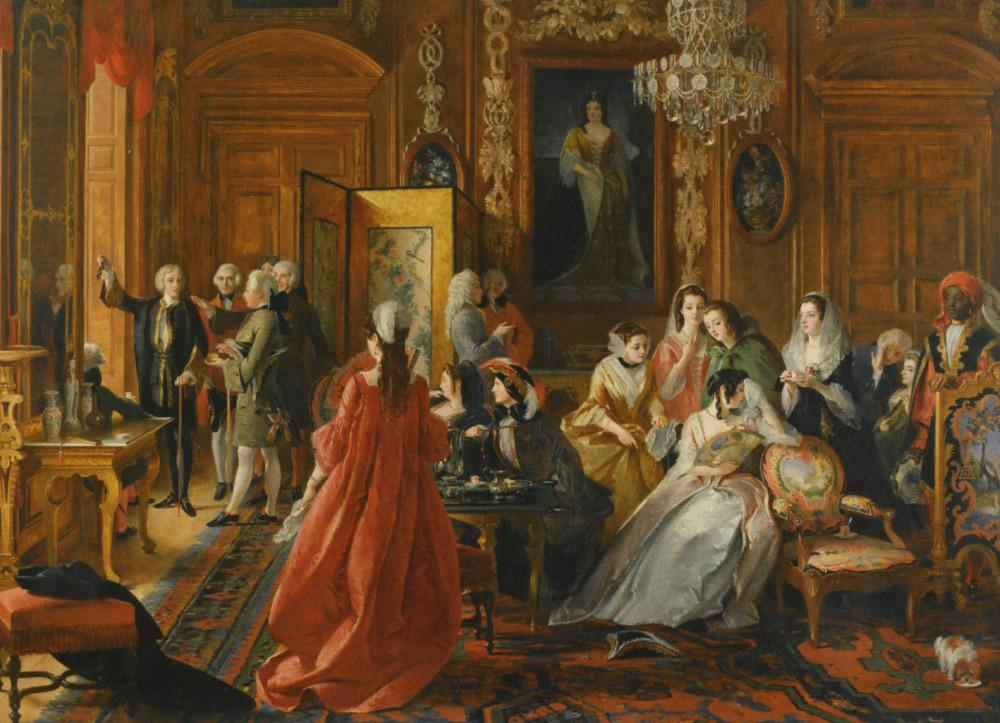
Sir Plume demands the restoration of the lock, an oil painting by Charles Robert Leslie, 1854

Meanwhile, in Britain most illustrations of the work were descending into "high kitsch and low camp". The 1798 edition, for example, illustrated by a variety of contemporary artists, is particularly noted now for Thomas Stothard's watercolour in which fairies are pictured with wings. Advised by William Blake to make the sylphs like butterflies, Stothard decided to "paint the wing from the butterfly itself" and immediately went out to catch one.

Oil paintings by two artists rise a little above this judgement. Henry Fuseli's erotic The Dream of Belinda goes beyond the actual episode to incorporate other imagery from the poem and some details peculiar only to Fuseli, such as the white moths in copulation in the lower foreground. He also illustrated the Cave of Spleen episode from Canto 4, but this met with contemporary scepticism and the original is now lost. Only Thomas Holloway's print remains to suggest that critics might have been right in seeing in it more "burlesque than sublimity". In the following century, Charles Robert Leslie's 1854 period piece, Sir Plume Demands the Restoration of the Lock, takes place in a cluttered drawing room in which the kind of lap dog present in many previous pictures feeds from a dish on the floor.

The nine photo-engravings with which Aubrey Beardsley "embroidered" the 1896 edition of the poem drew on the French rococo style, in which there was a contemporary revival of interest. Well received at the time, their enduring popularity can be attributed to their reinterpreting of the poem in ways only a very few had managed earlier.

== Influence ==
Pope's fanciful conclusion to his work, translating the stolen lock into the sky, where "'midst the stars [it] inscribes Belinda's name", alludes to the similar myth about the hair of the (real-world) Berenice II of Egypt, said to have been taken up to the heavens as the constellation Coma Berenices. This celestial conclusion contributed to the eventual naming of three of the moons of Uranus after characters from The Rape of the Lock: Umbriel, Ariel, and Belinda. The first two are major bodies, named in 1852 by John Herschel, a year after their discovery. The inner satellite Belinda was discovered in 1986, and is the only other of the planet's moons taken from Pope's poem rather than Shakespeare's works.

Modern adaptations of The Rape of the Lock include Deborah Mason's opera-ballet, on which the composer worked since 2002. Its premiere was as an opera-oratorio in June 2016, performed by the Spectrum Symphony of New York city and the New York Baroque Dance Company. There was a 2006 performance at Sheffield University's Drama Studio of a musical work based on Pope's poem composed by Jenny Jackson.
