= Wunda (crater) =

Crater on Uranus's moon Umbriel

Coordinates: 7.9°S 273.6°E

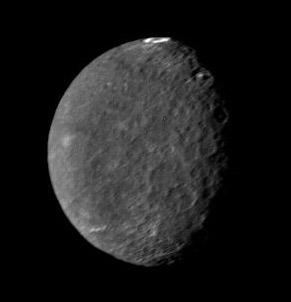
Wunda is a bright feature at the top of this image of Umbriel.

Wunda is a large crater on the surface of Uranus' moon Umbriel. It is 131 km in diameter and is located near the equator of Umbriel. The crater is named after Wunda, a dark spirit of Australian aboriginal mythology.

Wunda has a prominent albedo feature on its floor, which takes the shape of a ring of bright material at least 10 km in radial width. The reason for its brightness, which stands out from the very dark composition of the moon as a whole, is unknown. It may be either a fresh impact deposit or a deposit of carbon dioxide ice, which formed when the radiolytically formed carbon dioxide migrated from all over the surface of Umbriel and got trapped inside relatively cold Wunda.
