= Skynd (troll) =

Skynd is the name of a troll in a Danish fairy tale.

The tale was recorded by Just Mathias Thiele in Danmarks folkesagn, who localised it to Skjelverød, near Ringsted, where it was supposedly the origin of the place-name "Kirstens Bjerg" (Kirsten's hill), and in English by Thomas Keightley in his The Fairy Mythology. Edwin Sidney Hartland included it in his The Science of Fairy Tales, as a double example of the power of the knowledge of names. Keightley stated that the tale was "orally related to Mr. Thiele", but Thiele attributed it to Seyer Mahling Beyer's En geographisk-historisk og oeconomisk, physisk-antiqvarisk Beskrivelse over Bringstrup og Sigersted Sogne ved Ringsted (published in 1791) and noted a similar tale from Normandy.

The story is that a hill-troll living in the hill of that name had stolen three wives in succession from a man in the village of Englerup. Late one night, the man was riding home from Ringsted and saw a crowd of hill-dwellers dancing and making merry, among whom he recognised all three of his former wives. He called out to Kirsten, his second wife, whom he had loved best; the troll, whose name was Skynd (the imperative mood of the Danish verb skynde (to hurry), asked him why he presumed to call her name, and the man explained how much he had cherished her and begged to be allowed to take her home again. Finally Skynd granted his wish, on condition that he must never hurry (skynde) her. For a long time the man obeyed, but one day when she took a long time bringing something down from the loft, he called out "Skynd dig Kirsten!" (Hurry up, Kirsten!), (Note: Both Keightley and Hartland incorrectly printed Skynde; the imperative mood of the Danish verb skynde is skynd, as in Thiele's version.) and at once she vanished, forced to return to the troll in the hill, which since then has been called Kirsten's Bjerg.

According to Thiele, Beyer also wrote that the chalice in the church at Alsted had been taken from the underground dwellers (underjordiske) of Kirstens Bjerg.

The crater Skynd, on Uranus's moon Umbriel, is named after the troll.
