= Skynd (crater) =

Crater on Umbriel

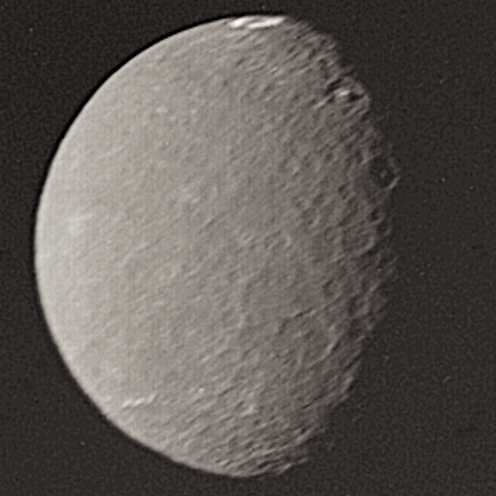
Skynd with bright central peak as seen along the terminator (near 2 o'clock) on Umbriel

Skynd is a crater on the surface of Uranus' moon Umbriel. It is estimated to be between 72 and 110 km in diameter. Its center is located at 1.8°S 331.7°E.

Skynd has a bright central or near central peak, which is one of the few bright albedo features on Umbriel that noticeably stands out against Umbriel's low albedo.

The crater is named after Skynd, a troll who stole three wives of a man living in Englerup.

== Sources ==
- Hunt, Garry E.; Moore, Patrick (1989). Atlas of Uranus. Cambridge University Press. p. 82. ISBN 978-0-521-34323-7. "Umbriel crater Skynd."
- USGS/IAU (October 1, 2006). "Skynd on Umbriel". Gazetteer of Planetary Nomenclature. USGS Astrogeology.
