= The Hollow (play) =

1951 play by Agatha Christie

- Original language: English
- Written by: Agatha Christie

Premiere
- Date: 10 February 1951
- Place: Cambridge Arts Theatre, United Kingdom

The Hollow is a 1951 play by crime writer Agatha Christie. It is based on the 1946 book of the same name.

== Background ==
In her Autobiography, Christie claimed that the success of And Then There Were None set her on the path of being a playwright as well as a writer of books and that only she would adapt her works for the stage from then on, and that The Hollow would be her next play. In writing this, Christie forgot her intervening plays of Appointment with Death (1945) and Murder on the Nile (1946), in addition to Moie Charles and Barbara Toy's 1949 adaptation of Murder at the Vicarage.

Christie had always felt that The Hollow would make a good play, but she came up against the opposition of her daughter, Rosalind Hicks, whom Christie affectionately described as having "had the valuable role in life of eternally trying to discourage me without success". Christie was determined to turn the book, which both she and Rosalind liked, into a play, but was equally adamant that in doing so it would lose the character of Hercule Poirot, whose appearance in the book she thought had "ruined it". The parts of the policemen were changed from the book as well from Inspector Grange and Sergeant Clark to Inspector Colquhoun and Detective Sergeant Penny.

Bertie Meyer, a backer of plays, whose association with Christie's stage works dated back to Alibi in 1928, signed a contract to produce The Hollow in 1950 and plans were made with Christie's agent, Edmund Cork, to open the play in London to coincide with the start of the Festival of Britain. These plans came to nothing and Christie was annoyed at the treatment she was starting to receive from Meyer on this and his slow response to staging another play she had written, Towards Zero. Meyer turned it down as he believed that it would be too difficult to cast, although it has been speculated that the anti-Semitism in the novel was the primary reason, him being Jewish. During the year, Peter Saunders, a young and new theatrical producer had sustained a significant loss when he staged an adaptation by Dan Sutherland of Sir Arthur Conan Doyle's 1913 book, The Poison Belt. Desperate to make up these losses, he cast around for a play that he could take on tour which would not involve too much expense and which would be sure to attract a paying audience. Charles and Toy's adaptation of Christie's Murder at the Vicarage was just about to finish a four-month run at the Playhouse Theatre and, desperate to minimise his costs, he hit upon the idea that the name of the actors who starred in the production wouldn't really matter as Christie herself was enough of a public name to attract the audience. He therefore deliberately advertised the play as Agatha Christie's "Murder at the Vicarage" rather than "Murder at the Vicarage" by Agatha Christie. This small piece of showmanship worked. He recouped his losses and, more importantly, brought himself to the attention of Christie who, annoyed with the slow progress of Bertie Meyer, gave The Hollow to Saunders instead.

Saunders faced great difficulties in staging the play, including refusals to assist in casting or finance from colleagues in the theatrical world, who felt that the piece was badly written. One problem was the casting of the star part of Lady Angkatell and it was Saunders who hit upon the idea of Jeanne De Casalis, a choice that Christie did not accept at first but which she later admitted was right.

The play opened at the Arts Theatre in Cambridge on 10 February 1951, although Christie was absent as she was in Iraq accompanying her husband Max Mallowan on one of his archaeological expeditions. She arranged for flowers to be sent to the female members of the cast. Hundreds of miles away, she was as nervous as ever at the public reaction, although she was reassured by telegrams which told her that the opening night was a success. Even so, Saunders and director Hubert Gregg had to make some amendments to take out some of the unintentional comic moments that had occurred on the first night.

After an eight-week tour, the play opened at the Fortune Theatre in London on 7 June 1951 to an enthusiastic press response. It transferred to the Ambassadors Theatre on 8 October 1951 and ran for a total of eleven months and 376 performances, enabling Christie to see it on her return.

One special thrill for Saunders was a request by Queen Mary, a noted Christie fan, to see the play. She came to the Fortune Theatre to do so and met various members of the cast in the interval. Christie herself was so pleased at the efforts that Saunders made that she took him to lunch just after Christmas 1951 and gave him a brown paper package. Inside it was the script for a new play she had just written, The Mousetrap.

== Synopsis ==
The action of the play passes in the garden room of Sir Henry Angkatell's house, The Hollow, about eighteen miles from London. Time: the present.

ACT I

- A Friday afternoon in early September

The play begins with Henrietta Angkatell (Henry's younger cousin, in her 30s) working on a sculpture and Sir Henry Angkatell reading a newspaper. Lucy Angkatell, Henry's wife, soon enters and makes some characteristically disjointed statements about moles in the garden. Discussion reveals that a number of guests will be arriving to spend the weekend at The Hollow. The first guest to arrive is Midge Hardcastle, another cousin to the Angkatells. The group reflects on a portrait of Ainswick, an estate once inhabited by Lucy Angkatell. Midge and Henrietta remember Ainswick fondly as well, having spent a part of their childhood or adolescence there. Gudgeon, the butler, soon shows in the next guest, Edward Angkatell, yet another cousin and the current owner and resident of Ainswick. It is made clear that Midge is in love with Edward, but Edward is in love with Henrietta. The Angkatell clan briefly leaves the stage, and Gudgeon returns with a maid in training, the working-class Doris. A car is heard, and Gudgeon greets the final guests, John and Gerda Cristow, a successful but condescending doctor and his slow-witted wife. After establishing that John doesn't think much of Gerda's intelligence, he departs, and Henrietta enters and warmly greets Gerda. Henrietta gives Gerda a statuette for which she had previously posed. John, Sir Henry, and Midge return from the garden, and John expresses disdain for the statuette. To break the tension, Henry mentions that film star Veronica Craye is currently residing nearby, in a cottage called Dovecotes. John and Henrietta find themselves alone on stage, and after John reveals that he and Veronica Craye were once lovers, it becomes apparent that he and Henrietta are currently having an affair. Edward walks in on an intimate moment between the two, and John leaves. Edward tries to convince Henrietta to return with him to Ainswick, but is rebuffed. Henrietta leaves to get dressed for a formal dinner, and Sir Henry and Midge come onstage. Midge discusses her employment at a dress shop, rejecting her cousins' pleas to accept their financial support and aristocratic lifestyle. As the Angkatells and Cristows all return to the stage, Veronica Craye makes a surprise appearance. She complains that her cottage has lost power, and her lighter is not working, and so is in need of matches. While waiting for Gudgeon to return with the matches, Veronica notices John, and reveals their past to the group. She asks John, dazed by her appearance, to come over after dinner. He assents, and the act ends as Veronica departs and the rest of the cast goes to dinner.

ACT II

- Scene 1 – Saturday morning

John Cristow enters, quickly followed by Gudgeon who bears a note that displeases John. Midge enters, and John goes off in search of Henrietta. Lucy enters, and reveals to Midge that she saw John return to the house at three in the morning. Sir Henry then passes through the room with a pair of revolvers on his way to the shooting range, revealing that Lucy is an accomplished markswoman while convincing Midge to join him at the targets. Henrietta enters as shots are heard from off-stage, quickly followed by Gerda who is alarmed by the gunfire. Henrietta convinces Gerda to try shooting, and the two leave for the target alley. John enters and begins to write letters as Lucy leaves with a basket of eggs. Veronica enters, interrupting John and revealing that she sent the note delivered by Gudgeon at the top of the act. Veronica's lighter is now working, and she reveals that her residence at Dovecotes was part of a plot to reunite with John. She expresses an interest in leaving her current husband and marrying John, but John rebuffs her, expressing a newfound satisfaction with his marriage and regret over the romantic activities of his overnight visit to Dovecotes. Veronica leaves in a rage, but not before threatening John with the telling line, "If I can't have you, no one shall." John finds himself alone, hears a noise from offstage, and goes to investigate. Gunshots are heard, and as John staggers and collapses, a revolver is thrown onstage. Gerda is the first to enter, and picks up the revolver. The entire cast quickly enters, and John musters the strength to call the name "Henrietta." Henrietta wrests the revolver from Gerda, and Gudgeon calls for a doctor as the curtain falls.

- Scene 2 – Later the same day

The curtain rises on Lucy, Edward, Henrietta, and Midge, sitting in an uncomfortable silence. Lucy expresses admiration for Inspector Colquhoun, the Scotland Yard detective investigating the murder. Gudgeon enters with lunch, and he and Lucy exchange clandestine comments about Lucy's basket of eggs. Lucy and Edward express the opinion that Gerda, having been discovered holding a gun near John after the shooting, is his murderer, while Henrietta insists that Gerda deserves a chance to defend herself. Gerda enters, soon followed by Sir Henry and Inspector Colquohoun. Colquohoun recommends that Gerda hire a solicitor before making a statement, but she declines, and describes her entrance as the audience observed immediately after the shooting. Gerda states that there was no disagreement between her and John in response to Colquohoun's queries. Colquohoun then asks to question Lucy who, delighted with the intrigue, readily complies. They leave with Sir Henry, leaving Edward and Henrietta alone. It becomes apparent that both knew about John and Veronica's rendezvous, Edward expresses sympathy for Henrietta's loss, and Henrietta has an emotional breakdown over John's death. Henrietta leaves as Midge enters. Edward pines for Henrietta while comforting Midge in fatherly way. She attempts to overcome his preconceptions, pointing out that she is "not a child" any more. Edward is called away to be questioned by the inspector, and Henrietta returns from a walk. She and Midge discuss Edward's misplaced affections, and Henrietta recommends that Midge be more bold with her advances. Lucy replaces Henrietta onstage, and expresses a desire for Henrietta and Edward to marry, ensuring that the Ainswick estate will remain in the family. The inspector enters with Police Sergeant Penny. They question Midge, who conceals her knowledge of John's affair with Henrietta, but acknowledges that John's final words were Henrietta's name. The police are left alone on stage. They note that Edward denies Cristow having any final words, while Sir Henry backs Midge's version of events. Henrietta returns, responds frankly to the inspector that she and John were romantically involved, and asserts that Gerda remains oblivious to the affair. Upon her departure, Colquohoun confides to Penny that the identity of the murderer is still unclear. Gudgeon enters, and hypothesizes that a mysterious handbag found on the sofa may belong to Veronica Craye. Fortuitously, Veronica appears, having heard about the murder. She claims John was obsessed with her, and that she had to rebuff his offer of reconciliation. She claims ownership of the handbag, but becomes irate when Colquohoun reveals a gun he found in the bag. Veronica storms out, refusing to comment further without a lawyer.

ACT III (The lights are lowered during the act to denote the passing of one hour.)

- The following Monday morning

The curtain rises on Inspector Colquohoun and Sergeant Penny looking at the portrait of Ainswick, and discussing the estate's inheritance. Doris enters, reveals that she saw Gudgeon carrying a revolver the day of the murder, and quickly leaves. Sir Henry enters, and upon being questioned about his firearm collection, says that the gun Gerda was holding at the time of the murder was among them, and that he had brought it to the target alley but had subsequently found it missing. Coulqouhoun states that ballistics evidence prove it was not the murder weapon after all. At Coulqouhoun's request, Henry checks his collection again, and discovers that a second gun of the same calibre is missing. Colquohoun shows him the gun found in Veronica's handbag, and Henry confirms that it is one and the same gun. Colquohoun then questions Gudgeon about Doris' earlier statement; Gudgeon confirms the event, saying he was simply up (having found the gun laying out), and had simply forgotten the incident. Lucy enters, dismisses Gudgeon, and reveals that the butler has been attempting to cover for her – the gun had been in her basket of eggs, though she claims not to remember why. When the detectives are gone, she confides to Henry that she had thought John might have an accident involving the basket, but that she would never actually go so far as to commit murder. Edward and Midge soon find themselves alone on stage. Edward's affections have changed, and he and Midge become engaged. Lucy enters, and is delighted by the news. Midge and Henrietta have a private conversation, and Midge begins to suspect that Edward has only proposed to create the illusion that he is not in love with Henrietta, which might be a motive for him to have murdered John. By the time Edward returns, Midge is convinced of this motivation, and calls off their engagement. Edward is distraught, and returns to the stage with a gun, clearly contemplating suicide. Midge finds him, confesses her fears, and the two reconcile. All depart for the formal inquest into the murder, and the lights fade.

An hour later Gerda and Henrietta enter. Henrietta asks Gerda what she has done with the holster of the murder weapon, stating that if they can get rid of that, there will be no evidence, and no one will be convicted of the murder. Gerda feigns ignorance, but Henrietta is persistent. Gerda tells Henrietta that the cut up scraps are in her leatherworking bag, and confides that she witnessed John's infidelity with Veronica, and therefore had to kill him. Henrietta goes offstage to get some tea to calm Gerda's frazzled nerves. Gerda, thinking she is unobserved, takes a vial of poison from her purse, and pours some into Henrietta's drink. Henrietta returned more quickly than Gerda expected, and witnesses this silently from just outside the room. She enters, more noisily this time. Vocalizing her decision to have tea with Gerda, rather than the sherry she had poured for herself, she leaves to get another teacup. Gerda picks up a revolver, but Inspector Coulquouhoun enters and takes it from her. Upon hearing that Veronica Craye will not be convicted of the murder (she somehow knows about the gun in Veronica's handbag), Gerda begins to go into a hysterical fit, calling for her deceased husband. Inspector Colquohoun unknowingly offers the poisoned drink to Gerda, who drinks it before she realises what she has done. Henrietta returns, and explains the poisoned drink to Colquohoun, who reveals that he had deduced Gerda's guilt from her character. Lucy enters, and the lights go down as the inspector calls the police station.

NOTE: Some modern productions restructure the play into two acts, with one intermission following Act 2, Scene 1.

== Reception ==
The Times reviewed the play in its issue of 8 June 1951. The reviewer felt that a chorus who stated the suspect's motives in any stage whodunit would "spare the author trouble and the audience tedium" but went on to say that, "once the fatal shot has been fired and the police arrive to ask questions there can be nothing but admiration for the impudent skill with which she directs suspense first this way, then that, and yet contrives to let certainty arrive in due course with an effect of genuine surprise." The reviewer described the play as an "ingenious entertainment" although admitting that there was "no very high polish on the performance" of the actors.

== Credits of London production ==
Director: Hubert Gregg

Cast:

- Beryl Baxter as Henrietta Angkatell
- George Thorpe as Sir Henry Angkatell, KCB
- Jeanne De Casalis as Lady Angkatell
- Jessica Spencer as Midge Harvey
- A. J. Brown as Gudgeon
- Colin Douglas as Edward Angkatell
- Patricia Jones as Doris
- Joan Newell as Gerda Cristow
- Ernest Clark as John Cristow, MD, FRCP
- Dianne Foster as Veronica Craye
- Martin Wyldeck as Inspector Coquelhoun, CID
- Shaw Taylor as Detective Sergeant Penny

== Publication ==
The play was published by Samuel French Ltd. The publication date, according to the English Catalogue of Books is 14 May 1953 but the file copy in the British Library is dated 1 July 1952. (The copyright date that appears in the play is 1952).

It was first published in hardback in The Mousetrap and Other Plays by G. P. Putnam's Sons in 1978 (ISBN 0-396-07631-9) and in the UK by HarperCollins in 1993 (ISBN 0-00-224344-X).
