= Hans Bachmann =

American actor (1954–2025)

- Born: Hans Rudolph Bachmann Jr. June 24, 1954; Cleveland, Ohio, U.S.
- Died: June 2, 2025 (aged 70); Washington, D.C., U.S.
- Occupations: Actor, director, singer, editor
- Years active: 1975–2024
- Spouse: Kevin m 2016. Debbie m 1981-divorced 1983

Hans Rudolph Bachmann Jr. (June 24, 1954 – June 2, 2025) was an American theatre and film actor, director, singer and editor of Swiss-German descent. He is best known for his lead roles as Harold Brickman in Beyond the Rising Moon and as Frank McCall in Invader.

== Early life ==
Hans Rudolph Bachmann Jr. was born in Cleveland, Ohio, on June 24, 1954, as the first of two children to Hans Rudolph Bachmann Sr. and Eulalia (Selig) Bachmann. His early years were spent growing up with his younger sister Eleanor Susan (Bachmann) Matthews in multiple locations in Ohio and elsewhere in the United States until his family settled down in Galion, Ohio, when he was 10 years old. His parents emigrated to the United States from Switzerland and Germany after the Second World War.

Bachmann graduated from Galion High School in 1972. He played the trumpet in High School and was a member of the marching band as well as first chair in the High School orchestra. He went to college at Ohio State University in Columbus, Ohio, where he received his Bachelor of Arts degree in English Theater in 1975. His studies included English as a major and Speech and Theater as minor subjects. Bachmann went on to study Law at Ohio Northern University in Ada, Ohio, between 1976 and 1981, receiving a Juris Doctor Degree upon completion.

== Career ==
Bachmann's acting career spanned over three decades. He spent the majority of his acting career on the theatre stage focussing predominantly on musicals.

One of his first roles was in the play 1776 which was performed at the Ohio State University, Mansfield Branch Campus in 1976. Bachmann played South Carolina's Edward Rutledge. Performances in subsequent years include Captain von Trapp in The Sound of Music, Adam Pontipee in Seven Brides for Seven Brothers and Emile De Becque in South Pacific.

Bachmann also directed various stage productions including Seven Brides for Seven Brothers, The Pajama Game, My Fair Lady, Hello Dolly!, A Christmas Carol, Witness for the Prosecution, Grease, Jesus Christ Superstar and Evita. The production of Meet Me in St. Louis with the Rockville Musical Theatre achieved the second runner-up award in the 1999 Ruby Griffith Awards for Outstanding Achievement in a Musical.

== Death ==
Bachmann died in Washington D.C. on June 2, 2025, at the age of 70.

== Filmography ==
- 1975 The Grotze - Farmer
- 1987 Broadcast News - Man at Speech
- 1987 Beyond the Rising Moon - Harold Brickman
- 1992 Invader - Frank McCall
- 2001 Great Books: Upton Sinclair's the Jungle (TV Movie)- Socialist Organizer
- 2002 Great Books: Exodus (TV Movie) - Father

=== Writer ===
Bachmann was a writer of the 1985 film Morgengrauen

=== Theater performances ===
American Century Theater, Arlington, Virginia

- Hollywood Pinafore - Mike Cochoran

Arena Stage, Washington, D.C.

- Screenplay - Comr Lister

Backstreet Theatre, Upper Sandusky, Ohio

- Barefoot in the Park - Paul Bratter
- Seesaw - Jerry Ryan
- The Music Man - Professor Harold Hill

C.A.S.T. in McLean, McLean, Virginia

- Bye Bye Birdie - Albert J Peterson
- Dial 'M' for Murder - Tony Wendice
- The Sound of Music - | Captain von Trapp

Encore Theater, Lima, Ohio

- The Pajama Game - Sid Sorokin

Fairstage Theatre

- 1776 - Thomas Jefferson
- Godspell - Jesus

Fay Jacobs Productions, Rehoboth Beach, DE

- USO Stage Door Canteen
- Man One

Folger Theatre, Washington, D.C.

- The Diary of a Scoundrel - Egor Kurchaev

Footlight Dinner Theater

- The Fantasticks - Matt
- Ford's Theatre
- Washington, D.C.
- A Christmas Carol
- Nephew Fred

Fredericksburg Summer Theatre, Fredericksburg, Virginia

- 1776 - Edward Rutledge
- Annie Get Your Gun - Frank Butler
- Bus Stop - Bo Decker
- Guys and Dolls - Sky Masterson
- Our Town - Simon Stimpson

Georgetown Summer Theater, Washington, D.C.

- Grease - Teen Angel/Johnny Casino

John F. Kennedy Center for the Performing Arts, Washington, D.C.

- Goldfish - Adolph Zucker

King's Jester Dinner Theater

- The Robber Bridegroom - * Preacher

Lazy Susan Dinner Theater, Woodbridge, Virginia

- 1776 - Edward Rutledge
- Camelot - King Arthur
- Clue the Musical - Professor Plum
- Do Black Patent Leather Shoes Really Reflect Up? - Father O’Reilley
- Guys and Dolls - Sky Masterson
- I Do! I Do! - Michael Snow
- Little Shop of Horrors - Skip Snip/M Luce
- Seven Brides for Seven Brothers - * Adam Ponitpee
- Show Boat - Gaylord Ravenal
- Something's Afoot - Nigel Rancoor
- Ten Little Indians - Judge Wargrave
- The Hollow - Sir Henry Angkatell
- The Murder at the Vicarage - Lawrence Redding
- The Pajama Game - Sid Sorokin
- The Sound of Music - Captain von Trapp

USO Stage Door Canteen - Man One

- Witness for the Prosecution - Sir Wilfred Robarts

Little Theatre of Alexandria, Alexandria, Virginia

- Baby - Nick Sakarian
- Mack and Mabel - Mack Sennett
- Something's Afoot - Nigel Rancoor
- Stardust - Andre

Mansfield Playhouse, Mansfield, Ohio

- A Comedy of Errors - Antipholus of Syracuse
- Romeo and Juliet - Romeo
- Zoo Story - Jerry

Mansfield Summer Theater, Mansfield, Ohio

- 1776 - Thomas Jefferson

Maryland Shakespeare Festival, Frederick, Maryland

- HMS Pinafore - Ralph Rackstraw
- Taming of the Shrew - Vincentio

Maryland Shakespeare Festival, St. Mary's, Maryland

- Living History - Dan Clocker

Community Players, McLean, Virginia

- Blame It On the Movies - Man One
- I Do! I Do!
- Michael Snow
- Seven Brides for Seven Brothers Adam Pontipee
- The Sound of Music - Captain von Trapp

National Theatre, Washington, D.C.

- Bobby Jean - Doug Simpson
- Cycles - Zachary Moon

Ohio Northern University, Ada, Ohio

- Hello World! - Max
- H.M.S. Pinafore - Captain Corcharan
- The Creation of the World and Other Business - Adam
- The Good Woman of Setzuan - Yang Sun

Ohio State University, Columbus, Ohio

- The Boys from Syracuse - Antipholus of Syracuse
- The Summer Tree - Matt
- Twice Told Tales - Young Goodman Brown

Puccunello's Dinner Theater, Mansfield, Ohio

- The Owl and the Pussycat - Felix Sherman

Rockville Little Theatre, Rockville, Maryland

- Light Up the Sky - Sven Svenson

Rockville Musical Theatre, Rockville, Maryland

- 20th Silver Anniversary Review - Himself
- Camelot - Lancelot du Lac
- Chess - Anatoly Sergievsky
- Guys and Dolls - Sky Masterson
- Hello, Dolly! - Mr Rose
- Mame - Beauregard Jackson Pickett Burnside
- Oklahoma!- Curly McClain
- On the 20th Century - Oscar Jaffe

Sandy Springs CommTheatre, Gaithersburg, Maryland

- Cabaret - Cliff Bradshaw

Second Star Productions, Bowie, Maryland

- I Do! I Do! - Michael Snow

Signature Theatre, Arlington, Virginia

- Strings of My Heart - Chuck

Silver Spring Stage, Silver Spring, Maryland

- Company - Bobby

Source Theatre, Washington, D.C.

- Bent - Wolf
- Echoes - Halderman
- Equus - Dalton\Horseman\Nugget
- Father's Day - Harold

St Marks Players, Washington, D.C.

- Oliver! - Bill Sykes

Tantallon Community Players, Fort Washington, Maryland

- Funny Girl - Nick Anrstein
- I Do! I Do! - Michael Snow
- Into the Woods - Cinderella's Prince/Wolf
- Oliver! - Bill Sykes
- The Scarlet Pimpernel - Sir Percy Blakeney
- The Sound of Music - Captain von Trapp

The Arlington Players, Arlington, Virginia

- Carnival! - Marco the Magnificent
- Love Letters - Andrew Makepeace Ladd III
- On the Town - Judge Pritkin
- Seven Brides for Seven Brothers - Adam Pontipee
- Sweeney Todd - Judge Turpin

The Tavern Stage

- The Way to the Top - Teddy Thoreau

Trinity Theatre, Washington, D.C.

- Guys and Dolls - Sky Masterson

West End Dinner Theatre, Alexandria, Virginia

- Grease - Vince Fontaine/Teen Angel
- Seven Brides for Seven Brothers - Adam Pontipee
- South Pacific - Emile De Becque
- The Sound of Music - Captain von Trapp

=== Director ===
American Music Stage, Burke, Virginia

- 42nd Street
- Aida

Atlas Theater, Washington, D.C.

- The Wiz

Backstreet Theater, Ada, Ohio

- Hello World!
- My Fair Lady
- The Robber Bridegroom

C.A.S.T. in McLean, McLean, Virginia

- Dial 'M' for Murder
- Gypsy
- Some Enchanted Evening
- South Pacific
- Dominion Stage, Arlington, Virginia
- They're Playing Our Song

Encore Theater, Lima, Ohio

- Mame
- The Music Man
- Foundry Players, Washington, D.C.
- Closer Than Ever

Lazy Susan Dinner Theater, Woodbridge, Virginia

- A Christmas Carol
- Appointment with Death
- Beehive
- Black Coffee
- Clue the Musical
- Death on the Nile
- Do Black Patent Leather Shoes Really Reflect Up?
- I Do! I Do!
- Me and My Girl
- Nunsense
- Seven Brides for Seven Brothers
- Something's Afoot
- Steel Magnolias
- Ten Little Indians
- The Hollow
- The Mousetrap
- The Murder at the Vicarage
- The Pajama Game
- The Spitfire Grill
- Witness for the Prosecution

Little Theater Of Alexandria, Alexandria, Virginia

- Something's Afoot

McLean Community Players, McLean, Virginia

- La Cage aux Folles
- Little Shop of Horrors

McLean Theater Alliance, McLean, Virginia

- Best Of Broadway I and II-Cabarets
- Seven Brides for Seven Brothers

Potomac Theater Company, Potomac, Maryland

- Something's Afoot

Rock Spring Congregational Church, McLean, Virginia

- Jesus Christ Superstar

Rockville Musical Theatre, Rockville, Maryland

- 42nd Street
- City of Angels
- Evita
- Meet Me In St. Louis
- Gypsy
- Hello, Dolly!
- My Fair Lady
- On the 20th Century
- RMT Silver Jubilee

Tantallon Community Players, Fort Washington, Maryland

- Guys and Dolls
- Our Town
- The Scarlet Pimpernel

The Writer's Center, Washington, D.C.

- The Most Romantic Hair In the World
