= Murder at the Vicarage (play) =

1949 play by Moie Charles and Barbara Toy

- Original programme
- Written by: Moie Charles and Barbara Toy
- Based on: The Murder at the Vicarage by Agatha Christie
- Original language: English

Premiere
- Date premiered: 17 October 1949
- Place premiered: New Theatre, Northampton

Murder at the Vicarage is a 1949 play by Moie Charles and Barbara Toy based on the 1930 novel of the same name by Agatha Christie. Christie's official biography suggests that the play was written by Christie with changes then made by Charles and Toy, presumably enough for them to claim the credit. Whatever the truth of the authorship, Christie was enthusiastic about the play and attended its rehearsals and first night.

This play, staged in 1949–1950, was the first time that the character Miss Marple was portrayed outside the novels and short stories.

== London production ==
It was first performed at the New Theatre, Northampton on 17 October 1949 prior to moving to the Playhouse Theatre in the West End where it opened on 16 December 1949. The play was the first time that the character of Miss Marple had been depicted outside the original books and she was portrayed by Barbara Mullen. The director was Reginald Tate who also played the part of Lawrence Redding. The play enjoyed a run of 126 performances, closing on 1 April 1950.

== Reception ==
In its issue of 15 December 1949, The Times gave an unenthusiastic review which began, "Everyone has a motive for killing. Nobody, unhappily, has any good stage reason for living. It is not until the final scene - the pressure of events then forcing two of the characters into melodramatic life - that we become aware that there was, after all, an effective one-act play in Miss Christie's novel". The unnamed reviewer complained of the "walking ciphers of the vicarage" and "the rather thin theatrical excitement of first one, then another confession, both of which possibly cancel each other". Despite these comments, the actors and the direction were both praised.

Ivor Brown, reviewing the play in the 18 December 1949 issue of The Observer said, "Barbara Mullen is excellent as that sharp-eyed Prodnose Miss Marple, along with that of Reginald Tate as the questionable painter and of Jack Lambert as the nice, dull, dutiful vicar, gives West End quality to a production otherwise on a less exalted level. The whole thing could have been made more effective by better casting of certain parts, however, the company, which started with a nervous over-emphasis and clouted us over their heads with their lines, steadied by half-time and the second act was very much more persuasive than the first."

== National tour by Saunders ==
After closing in the West End it was picked up later that year by Peter Saunders for a national tour as he was desperate to recoup his losses from a failed staging of Sir Arthur Conan Doyle's 1913 book, The Poison Belt. He hit upon the idea that the name of the actors who starred in the production would not really matter as Christie herself was enough of a public name to attract the audience. He therefore advertised the play as Agatha Christie's "Murder at the Vicarage" rather than "Murder at the Vicarage" by Agatha Christie. This small piece of showmanship worked. He recouped his losses.

More importantly, he brought himself to the attention of Christie who, annoyed with the slow progress of the usual producer of her plays, Bertie Meyer, offered her latest play, The Hollow to Saunders instead. This started an association between Saunders and Christie which was to last for many years and culminate in The Mousetrap, the play with the longest continuing original run in theatre history.

== Cast of 1949 London Production ==
List of actor and role
Barbara Mullen as Miss Marple
Jack Lambert as The Vicar (the Rev. Leonard Clement)
Genine Graham as Griselda (his wife)
Michael Newell as Dennis (his nephew)
Betty Sinclair as Mary (the maid)
Michael Darbyshire as Ronald Hawes (the curate)
Andrea Lee as Lettice Protheroe
Mildred Cottell as Mrs Price Ridley
Alvys Maben as Anne Protheroe
Reginald Tate as Lawrence Redding (an artist)
Francis Roberts as Dr John Haydock
Stanley Van Beers as Inspector Slack

== Publication history ==
The play was first published by Samuel French in January 1951 (copyright dated 1950).

== Synopsis of scenes ==
The action of the play passes in the study of a vicarage in the country, at the present time.

- ACT I
  - SCENE 1 - A Tuesday in summer. Afternoon.
  - SCENE 2 - The following day. 6.45pm.
  - SCENE 3 - Thursday morning.
- ACT II
  - SCENE 1 - The following Sunday. Late afternoon.
  - SCENE 2 - An hour and a half later.
