= Invader (1992 film) =

- Home video cover
- Directed by: Philip J. Cook
- Written by: Philip J. Cook
- Produced by: John R. Ellis
- Starring: Hans Bachmann
- Cinematography: Philip J. Cook
- Edited by: Philip J. Cook
- Music by: David Bartley
- Distributed by: 21st Century Film Corporation
- Release dates: April 4, 1992 (North Theater, Columbus, Ohio)
- Running time: 95 minutes
- Country: United States
- Language: English
- Budget: $234,000

Invader is a 1992 direct-to-video science fiction film by Philip J. Cook, starring Hans Bachmann, A. Thomas Smith and Rick Foucheux. It is the story of a journalist who uncovers an extraterrestrial entity taking over an air force base in Washington, D.C., and must foil its plans of world domination.

Most of Invader was produced independently in 1989 by Philip Cook and producer John Ellis, since Cook's previous film Beyond the Rising Moon had not been enough of a success to attract investors. Cook shot all the inexpensive dialogue sequences, and the result impressed Menahem Golan such that he agreed to finance the remainder of the film. Invader was originally released on VHS by Trimark and LaserDisc by Pioneer Corporation, and earned some positive reviews.

In 2006, Invader was recut by Cook's production company Eagle Films for its DVD release. The new release features CGI special effects to augment the in-camera effects from 1992.

== Plot ==
In the opening sequence, four airmen from Clark Air Base in Washington, D.C., frantically attempt to escape the base. A contingent of soldiers soon blocks their path. Most of the escapees are shot, but one sees a flying saucer which burns him to a crisp with its energy weapon.

Frank Mccall (Hans Bachmann) is an overqualified photojournalist writing about two-headed dogs and alien abductions for the sleazy National Scandal tabloid. When the airman's charred corpse is found, he is assigned to the story. When government agents try to keep him out, he resolves to sneak into the airbase, where a top-secret fighter plane is to be demoed that night. The plane is equipped with an experimental software system called A.S.M.O.D.S, which suddenly malfunctions mid-demo, crashing the plane. As the disappointed top brass go home, Mccall is intercepted by Captain Anders (A. Thomas Smith), who orders him taken into custody and his camera seized.

Sinister men in black wrench Mccall away, taking him to a storage compartment to be injected with a glowing green substance and brainwashed with an electronic apparatus. Anders and Colonel Faraday (Rick Foucheux) arrive in time to stop them, and the men shoot themselves. Anders takes Mccall into custody himself, while Faraday returns to the base. Suddenly, the flying saucer from the opening appears. Anders shoots it, to no effect, while Mccall photographs it with his backup disc camera. Powerless against the invader, they drive away, dodging more men in black on the way, and lock themselves in the base.

Mccall's camera is again confiscated, its photos to be developed as evidence. Mccall manages to secure the prints, and also spies on Anders conversing with the General. He thus finds out that the A.S.M.O.D.S. system uses alien technology recovered from a crashed spaceship in the New Mexico desert, and this technology seems to have a mind of its own. The men in black break their way in, so Mccall escapes with Anders in the F-117 stealth fighter. They have a brief dogfight with some F-16s out of Clark, which ends when they manage to secure air support from the Pentagon.

Mccall and Anders are questioned, and eventually manage to convince General Anheiser (John Cook) that A.S.M.O.D.S. has taken over the base computers using the intranet, and brainwashed all of the soldiers into its control. They agree to go investigate the next day. In between time, Mccall quits his job at the Scandal, realizing he is onto the story of the century.

At the airbase, the trio is greeted by a now-brainwashed Faraday. His troops destroy their helicopter escort, and he takes them down to the subbasement, which has been excavated into a gaping cavern. There Faraday reveals the alien's plan: it cannibalized the base hardware to build a giant robot, HARV, with which to conquer the world after nuking China and Russia. Mccall realizes that just as the alien programming seeped into A.S.M.O.D.S., so A.S.M.O.D.S. has seeped into the alien, arming it with a nationalistic impulse to destroy America's enemies.

The protagonists manage to shoot Faraday's guards. HARV tries to stop them, but only succeeds in killing Faraday. They search the basement for weapons with which to destroy HARV and avert World War III. They find a rocket launcher and two rockets; their first attempt misses, but the second is a direct hit, with one second to spare before HARV would launch the missiles. The ending sequence shows several newspapers honoring Mccall for his heroics, while the National Scandal claims the alien invasion was a hoax.

== Cast ==
- Hans Bachmann as Frank McCall
- A. Thomas Smith as Captain Harry Anders
- Robert Biedermann as Harvey Briggs
- Catherine Blais as Engineer Collins
- Ralph C. Bluemke as Rogers (credited as Ralph Bluemke)
- Phil Bonifant as Sheriff Sprig
- Jim Byrnes as Engineer Powell (scenes deleted)
- Brown Cardwell as Louise / Agent Kelly
- Ed Carne as Agent Drexel
- Pat Carroll as Horace
- Patrick Clark as Agent Raimi
- Philip J. Cook as Harvey "Big Harvey"
- John Cooke as General Anheiser
- Tim Davis as Agent Coy
- Rick Foucheux as Colonel Faraday
- James Henson as Jim
- James H. Housely as J.D.
- Meryl Kanegis as Judy
- Idy Marcus as Escort
- Dave Nuttycombe as Harry (credited as Dave Nutticomb)
- Frank Robinson Jr. as Airman Land
- Pat Ryan as Private Jackson
- Robert Sams as Engineer Darlow
- Alison Sheehy as Sandy (credited as Allison Sheehy)
- George Stover as Engineer Burke
- Rodney Williams Sr. as Sergeant Peters

== Production ==
After finishing the space adventure film Beyond the Rising Moon in 1987, director Philip Cook and producer John Ellis decided their next picture should be more grounded so they would not need to build sets from scratch. Cook wrote the screenplay for Invader, then known as The Killing edge, in two weeks. He was inspired by the political climate of the time to give the film an edge of satire, and determined to make it more fun and lightweight than Moon, which he found "a little pretentious".

Cook wrote the parts of Mccall and Faraday with Hans Bachmann and Rick Foucheux from Moon already in mind; the actor originally chosen for the role of Anders declined after having a falling out with the producer. Foucheux introduced Cook to John Cooke, who played General Anheiser; they knew each other through Washington's theater scene.

Cook and Ellis could not raise enough money for the entire film at the time, so in winter of 1989 they shot $50,000's worth of live-action footage—hoping to later convince investors to finance the more effects-intensive scenes. Due to the limited budget, the production ran on a skeleton crew: Cook, Ellis, a camera assistant and a sound recordist. Cook was the film's director, cinematographer, special effects supervisor and editor. Ellis did the miniature pyrotechnics, and took care of various odds and ends. Crewmembers collaborated in building the sets and miniatures.

They took the film to the American Film Market, and Menahem Golan agreed to front the $125,000 required to finish. The remaining scenes were shot between the fall of 1990 and 1991. As in Moon, most special effects were achieved using miniatures—Cook credits Gerry Anderson's shows as a creative influence. The helicopter ridden by the heroes never left the ground: the shots of flight were accomplished with remote control models. The battle with HARV in the cavern was filmed using stop-motion animation on a miniature set. Matte paintings were used to integrate the actors into the cavern.

== Release ==
Invader was remastered with CGI for its DVD release. In this computer-generated scene, an F-117 stealth fighter flies over Washington, D.C.

According to Ellis's website Invader premiered on April 4, 1992, in Columbus, Ohio. was distributed on VHS by Trimark and LaserDisc by Pioneer in 1992. Cook recalls that it sold well. It also ran on the television networks HBO and Cinemax.

For the 2006 DVD release, Cook's production company Eagle Films produced a new version of Invader with CGI enhancements to the original 1992 in-camera special effects. The most significant changes were made to the dogfight scene.

Trimark (a.k.a. Vidmark, now Lionsgate) chose the cover artwork for the film, which depicts a squad of futuristic-looking soldiers that never appear in the film. Cook relates that the crew was perplexed by this choice, but figured the image's visual appeal would sell a lot of videotapes. The art was used again for the Lionsgate DVD release.

=== Reception ===
Cavett Binion, writing for the New York Times, found the picture's "modestly entertaining if not particularly original", citing similarities to Colossus: The Forbin Project. She also remarked that it features the same kind of "goofy paranoia" that would later fuel The X-Files. Leonard Maltin enjoyed the "clever" script and "impressive" budget-conscious special effects. Similar praise was issued by Imagi-Movies and Cinefantastique.

Martial arts film producer Godfrey Ho was also impressed by the cinematography in Invader, so much so that he hired Cook as director of photography for Undefeatable.
