= Melinda O. Fee =

American actress (1942–2020)

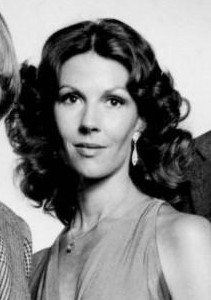
- Fee on set of The Invisible Man (1975)
- Born: October 7, 1942
- Died: March 24, 2020 (aged 77)
- Education: University of Southern California (BA); University of Uppsala
- Occupation: Actress
- Years active: 1965–1991
- Known for: The Invisible Man; Days of Our Lives; The Guiding Light; Santa Barbara; The Bionic Woman
- Mother: Astrid Allwyn

Melinda O. Fee (October 7, 1942 – March 24, 2020) was an American actress who starred in films and on television.

== Early life ==
Her mother was actress Astrid Allwyn, and her father was Charles Fee, an insurance executive. Fee graduated with honors with a BA in drama from the University of Southern California, after which she studied for a year at the University of Uppsala in Sweden.

== Career ==
Her first starring role was on the television series Love of Life. Most of her other television roles were on soap operas like Guiding Light as Charlotte Waring Fletcher Bauer from 1971 to 1973, Days of Our Lives as Mary Anderson from 1981 to 1982, and Santa Barbara as Olivia Welles from 1987 to 1988. She starred with David McCallum on the short-lived television series The Invisible Man (1975–76), playing the title character's wife, Dr. Kate Westin. Fee also starred in made-for-TV movies, and guest starred on many 1970s television series, including Quincy, M.E., The Bionic Woman, CHiPs, Eight is Enough, and Dallas. In 1984, Fee served as temporary replacement for Brenda Dickson as Jill Foster Abbott on The Young and the Restless. Ms. Fee also appeared in an episode of "Mannix" in 1968 entitled "License to Kill."

She appeared in the feature films The Unkissed Bride (1966), Fade to Black (1980), and A Nightmare on Elm Street 2: Freddy's Revenge (1985). Fee made guest appearances on television series including My Favorite Martian, Lost in Space, Knight Rider, Beverly Hills, 90210, and Match Game with Gene Rayburn.

== Personal life ==
Fee suffered a massive stroke and died in the hospital on March 24, 2020. She requested that no funeral or memorial service be held.

== Filmography ==
Film
Year	Title	Role	Notes
1966	The Unkissed Bride		
1980	The Aliens Are Coming	Gwendolyn O'Brien	TV movie
1980	Fade to Black	Talk Show Hostess	
1985	Doin' Time	Denise	
1985	A Nightmare on Elm Street 2: Freddy's Revenge	Mrs. Webber	
1991	Changes	Diana Maxwell	TV movie
1991	California Casanova	Madam Luchband	(final film role)

Television
Year	Title	Role	Notes
1965	My Favorite Martian	Sylvia (as Melinda Fee)	Episode: "Tim and Tim Again"
1966	The John Forsythe Show	Miss Johnson	Episode: "Is It a Bird? Is It a Plane? No, It's Miss Culver!"
1966	I Dream of Jeannie	Cashier (uncredited)	Episode: "How Lucky Can You Get?"
1966	Lost in Space	Fenestra (as Melinda Fee)	Episode: "Space Circus"
1968	Mannix	Honey Hilton	Episode: "Sayanora Dagwood"
1968	Blondie	Allison West (as Melinda Fee)	Episode: "License to Kill - Limit Three People"
1969	Love, American Style	Miss 45961 (segment "Love and the Dating Computer") (as Melinda Fee)	Episode: "Love and the Dating Computer/Love and the Busy Husband/Love and the Watchdog"
1970	Love of Life	Victoria Randolph	
1971-1973	The Guiding Light	Charlotte Waring Bauer	4 episodes
1974	'Sandburg's Lincoln"	Kate Chase, daughter of Treasury Secretary Salmon Chase (as Melinda Fee)	TV mini series
1975	Caribe	Thea Blake (as Melinda Fee)	Episode: "The Assassin"
1975	Match Game '75	Herself	Taped: October 18, 1975; Aired: November 11-14; 17, 1975
1975	Match Game PM	Herself	Taped: October 18, 1975
1975–1976	The Invisible Man	Dr. Kate Westin	13 episodes
1977	Quincy, M.E.	Addie	Episode: "An Unfriendly Radiance"
1977	The Bionic Woman	Tammy Cross	2 episodes
1978	CHiPs	Sarah (as Melinda Fee)	Episode: "Cry Wolf"
1979	Dallas	Cathy Baker (as Melinda Fee)	Episode: "Home Again"
1979	Eight is Enough	Gwendolyn Elkhart (as Melinda Fee)	Episode: "The Yearning Point"
1980	The Aliens Are Coming	Gwendolyn O'Brien (as Melinda Fee)	television film
1980	Vega$	Kay Drummond	Episode: "Christmas Story"
1981	Flamingo Road	Pat Simmons	Episode: "The Election"
1982	Match Game	Herself	Taped: January 15, 1982
1981-1982	Days of Our Lives	Mary Anderson Marshall	127 episodes
1983	Casablanca	Ynez	Episode: "The Cashier and the Belly Dancer"
1983	Knight Rider	Suzanne Weston	Episode: "Custom K.I.T.T."
1984	The Young and the Restless	Jill Foster Abbott #4	
1984	Three's a Crowd	Ms. Cartwright	Episode: "The Happy Couple"
1986	MacGyver	Carol Lafferty	Episode: "Ugly Ducking"
1987	Cagney & Lacey	Rhonda Benson	Episode: "Loves Me Not"
1987	She's the Sheriff		Episode: "Call Me Madam"
1987-1988	Santa Barbara	Olivia	7 episodes
1988	Matlock	Marsha Gold	Episode: "The Heiress"
1991	Matlock	Barbara Grayson (as Melinda Fee)	Episode: "The Parents"
1991	Beverly Hills, 90210	Mrs. Coolidge (as Melinda Fee)	Episode: "One Man and a Baby"
1991	Changes	Diane Maxwell (as Melinda Fee)	television film
