= Halliwell Hobbes =

English actor (1877–1962)

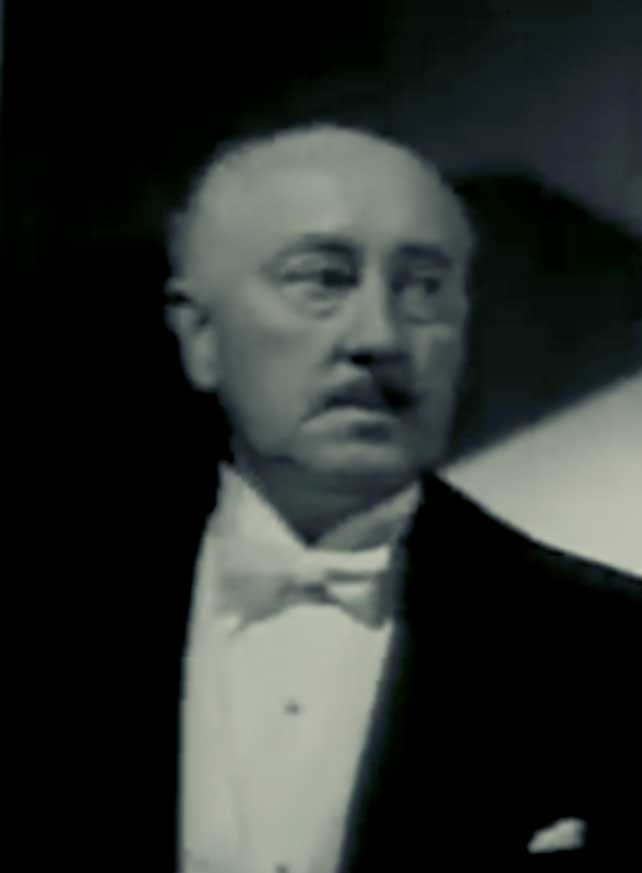
- Hobbes in Fit for a King (1937)
- Born: Herbert Halliwell Hobbes; 16 November 1877; Stratford-upon-Avon, Warwickshire, England, UK
- Died: 20 February 1962 (aged 84); Santa Monica, California, U.S.
- Occupation: Actor
- Years active: 1898–1956
- Spouse: Nancie B. Marsland (m. 1915)
- Children: Peter Halliwell Hobbes

Herbert Halliwell Hobbes (16 November 1877 – 20 February 1962) was an English actor.

== Early years ==
Hobbes's schooling came at Trinity College in Stratford-upon-Avon.

== Career ==
Hobbes's stage debut was as a member of Frank Benson's company, in the role of Tybalt in Romeo and Juliet in 1898. In 1908 and 1910 he played Prince Michael in The Prince and the Beggar Maid at the Lyceum Theatre in London.

Of his performance in a 1923 production of Ferenc Molnar's The Swan, Benjamin De Casseres wrote:

I would like to enlarge, if space permitted, on that delicious and wonderful Father Hyacinth (Halliwell Hobbes) in "The Swan." Here is a man of the cloth, sane, human, a portrait that is hard to forget. No neurosis there! No agenbite of inwit there! Because Father Hyacinth has the thing that saves—humour. He is tolerant of all things except sham, and is not even intolerant of that. In the drama, as in life, it is the smile that sets us free.

Hobbes moved back to Broadway by the mid-1940s, appearing in Romeo and Juliet as Lord Capulet and continuing there until late 1955. By 1950 he had moved to American television in the diverse playhouse format.

A heart ailment caused Hobbes to retire in 1956.

== Personal life ==
In 1915, Hobbes married Nancie Brenda Marsland, an actress. They had one son, actor Peter Hobbes.

== Death ==
After Hobbes died from a heart attack on February 20, 1962, he was buried at the Chapel of the Pines Crematory in Los Angeles.

== Filmography ==
- Lucky in Love (1929) as Earl of Balkerry (film debut)
- Jealousy (1929) as Rigaud
- Grumpy (1930) as Ruddick
- Charley's Aunt (1930) as Stephen Spettigue
- The Bachelor Father (1931) as Larkin, the Butler
- The Right of Way (1931) as The Siegneur
- The Lady Refuses (1931) as Sir James - Lawyer (uncredited)
- Five and Ten (1931) as Hopkins (uncredited)
- The Woman Between (1931) as Barton - the Butler
- The Sin of Madelon Claudet (1931) as Roget
- Platinum Blonde (1931) as Butler
- Dr. Jekyll and Mr. Hyde (1931) as Brig. Gen. Danvers Carew
- Forbidden (1932) as Florist (uncredited)
- Lovers Courageous (1932) as Mr. Smith
- The Menace (1932) as Phillips
- Love Affair (1932) as Kibbee
- Devil's Lottery (1932) as Lord Litchfield
- Man About Town (1932) as Hilton
- Week Ends Only (1932) as Martin
- Six Hours to Live (1932) as Baron Emil von Sturm
- Payment Deferred (1932) as A Prospective Tenant
- Cynara (1932) as Coroner at Inquest
- Looking Forward (1933) as Mr. James Felton
- A Study in Scarlet (1933) as Dearing
- Midnight Mary (1933) as Churchill
- Captured! (1933) as British Major General
- The Masquerader (1933) as Brock
- Lady for a Day (1933) as Butler
- If I Were Free (1933) as Burford - Gordon's Butler (uncredited)
- Should Ladies Behave (1933) as Louis
- I Am Suzanne (1933) as Dr. Lorenzo
- Mandalay (1934) as Col. Dawson Ames
- Riptide (1934) as Bollard
- All Men Are Enemies (1934) as Clarendon
- Double Door (1934) as Mr. Chase
- The Key (1934) as General C.O. Furlong
- Madame Du Barry (1934) as English Ambassador
- Bulldog Drummond Strikes Back (1934) as First Bobby
- She Was a Lady (1934) as George Dane
- British Agent (1934) as Sir Walter Carrister
- We Live Again (1934) as Official (uncredited)
- Menace (1934) as Skinner
- Father Brown, Detective (1934) as Sir Leopold Fischer
- The Right to Live (1935) as Sir Stephen Barr
- Folies Bergère de Paris (1935) as Monsieur Paulet
- Vanessa: Her Love Story (1935) as Father of Little Girl (uncredited)
- Cardinal Richelieu (1935) as Father Joseph
- Jalna (1935) as Uncle Ernest Whiteoak
- Charlie Chan in Shanghai (1935) as Chief of Police
- Millions in the Air (1935) as Theodore
- Captain Blood (1935) as Lord Sunderland (uncredited)
- Rose Marie (1936) as Mr. Gordon (uncredited)
- Here Comes Trouble (1936) as Prof. Howard
- The Story of Louis Pasteur (1936) as Dr. Lister
- Dracula's Daughter (1936) as Hawkins
- Changing of the Guard (1936, Short) as Grandfather, the Colonel
- Hearts Divided (1936) as Cambaceres
- The White Angel (1936) as Lord Raglan
- Spendthrift (1936) as Beuhl - the Butler
- Mary of Scotland (1936) as Minor Role (uncredited)
- Give Me Your Heart (1936) as Oliver
- Love Letters of a Star (1936) as Hotchkiss
- Maid of Salem (1937) as Jeremiah
- The Prince and the Pauper (1937) as Archbishop
- Parnell (1937) as W.H. Smith (uncredited)
- Fit for a King (1937) as Count Strunsky
- Varsity Show (1937) as Dean Meredith
- The Jury's Secret (1938) as John, The Butler
- Bulldog Drummond's Peril (1938) as Professor Bernard Goodman
- Kidnapped (1938) as Dominie Campbell
- You Can't Take It With You (1938) as DePinna
- Service de Luxe (1938) as Butler
- Storm Over Bengal (1938) as Sir John Galt
- A Christmas Carol (1938) as Clergyman Sliding on Sidewalk (uncredited)
- Pacific Liner (1939) as Captain Mathews
- The Hardys Ride High (1939) as Dobbs, the Butler
- Tell No Tales (1939) as Dr. Lovelake
- Naughty but Nice (1939) as Dean Burton, Winfield College
- Nurse Edith Cavell (1939) as English Chaplain
- Remember? (1939) as Butler Williams
- The Light That Failed (1939) as Doctor
- The Earl of Chicago (1940) as Lord Chancellor
- Waterloo Bridge (1940) as Vicar at St. Matthews (uncredited)
- The Sea Hawk (1940) as Astronomer
- Third Finger, Left Hand (1940) as Burton
- Lady with Red Hair (1940) as Divorce Judge (uncredited)
- That Hamilton Woman (1941) as Rev. Nelson
- Sunny (1941) as Johnson (uncredited)
- Here Comes Mr. Jordan (1941) as Sisk
- Dr. Kildare's Wedding Day (1941) as Minister (uncredited)
- Son of Fury: The Story of Benjamin Blake (1942) as Purdy
- To Be or Not to Be (1942) as General Armstrong
- The War Against Mrs. Hadley (1942) as Bennett
- The Undying Monster (1942) as Walton, the Butler
- Journey for Margaret (1942) as Mr. Barrie
- Forever and a Day (1943) as Doctor
- Sherlock Holmes Faces Death (1943) as Brunton
- Mr. Muggs Steps Out (1943) as Charney, the Butler
- His Butler's Sister (1943) as Willebrandt (uncredited)
- Gaslight (1944) as Mr. Muffin
- Mr. Skeffington (1944) as Soames (uncredited)
- The Invisible Man's Revenge (1944) as Cleghorn
- Casanova Brown (1944) as Charles
- Information Please (1944, Short) as Leutnant Eberhard (uncredited)
- Canyon Passage (1946) as Clenchfield
- If Winter Comes (1947) as The Coroner
- The Black Arrow (1948) as Bishop of Tisbury
- You Gotta Stay Happy (1948) as Martin
- That Forsyte Woman (1949) as Nicholas Forsyte
- Miracle in the Rain (1956) as Ely B. 'Windy' Windgate (final film)

== Partial Broadway credits ==
- And Then There Were None (1943)
- Murder on the Nile/Hidden Horizon (1944–45)
