= Verdict (play) =

1958 play by Agatha Christie

- Original language: English
- Written by: Agatha Christie

Premiere
- Date: 25 February 1958
- Place: United Kingdom

Verdict is a 1958 play by British mystery writer Agatha Christie. It is unusual for Agatha Christie plays in more than one way: for example, it is an original play, not based on a story or novel; and though there is a murder in the story, it is a melodrama more than a typical 'whodunnit' mystery as the murder takes place on stage.

It was first produced by Peter Saunders and directed by Charles Hickman, with decor by Joan Jefferson Farjeon. The play premiered at the Grand Theatre, Wolverhampton on 25 February 1958, before moving to the Strand Theatre, London on 22 May 1958. It ran for 250 performances. In 1987 the play ran in the Arena Players Main Stage Theater in East Farmingdale, New York, and in May 2009 it premiered with an international cast in Luxembourg's Abbaye de Neumunster.

== Plot summary ==
Karl Hendryk is a professor who was forced to flee his (unspecified) home country with his wife Anya after he gave refuge to the family of a colleague who had been arrested for his political views. He has found a position at a British university and earned the respect of its students and faculty, and he is in great demand for private lessons. Anya, an invalid suffering from a debilitating and incurable disease, bitterly regrets having to leave her friends and is deeply unhappy with all aspects of her life in England. Lisa Koletzky, Anya's cousin and close friend, has moved in with the couple to help care for Anya; they are assisted by a housekeeper, Mrs. Roper.

Karl has rejected a tutoring request from a young woman named Helen Rollander because he does not believe she is ready to put forth the effort needed to succeed in academics. However, he changes his mind after her wealthy father offers to use his influence to have Anya admitted to a clinic that is researching possible cures for her illness. Helen tells Karl she is in love with him, but he does not reciprocate; later, after learning that Anya has occasionally considered killing herself, Helen murders her by administering an overdose of her heart medication. She plants Anya's fingerprints on the medicine bottle and glass to make it appear that Anya has committed suicide.

A coroner's inquest is held, but no definite conclusions are reached as to whether the death was an accident, suicide, or murder. Lisa, who had normally given Anya her medicine, is sure that she did not leave it within reach on the day Anya died. Helen privately admits to Karl that she killed Anya in order to be with him; he is horrified at the revelation. However, he decides not to turn her in to the police since doing so will not bring Anya back, and also because he believes he may have led Helen on somehow. Lisa admits that she has long harbored a romantic attraction toward Karl, and the two embrace, unaware that they are being watched.

The police open an investigation and determine that Anya's fingerprints on the bottle and glass were indeed planted. Lisa is placed under arrest based on a statement from Mrs. Roper, who had seen her handle the items shortly after Anya's death and had also seen her and Karl embrace. Karl tells the police of Helen's confession, but they confront him with news that she has stepped in front of an oncoming lorry and been struck, sustaining fatal injuries. With no solid evidence to support it, Karl's claim is dismissed as an effort to shift suspicion away from Lisa.

Lisa is tried on a charge of murder and acquitted. She decides to move out of Karl's home despite her attraction to him, saying that his ideals of loyalty and benevolence inevitably cause suffering to those who love him. She packs her belongings and leaves, but returns a short time later because she cannot bear to be apart from him.

== Synopsis of scenes ==
The action of the play passes in the living-room of Professor Hendryk's flat in Bloomsbury. Time: not clear but probably in the 1950s.

ACT I

- Scene 1 – An afternoon in early spring
- Scene 2 – A fortnight later. Afternoon.

ACT II

- Scene 1 – Four days later. About midday.
- Scene 2 – Six hours later. Evening.
- Scene 3 – Two months later. Late afternoon.

== Cast of London production ==
- George Roubicek played Lester Cole
- Gretchen Franklin played Mrs. Roper
- Patricia Jessel played Lisa Koletzky
- Gerard Heinz played Professor Karl Hendryk
- Derek Oldham played Dr. Stoner
- Viola Keats played Anya Hendryk
- Moira Redmond played Helen Rollander
- Norman Claridge played Sir William Rollander
- Michael Golden played Detective Inspector Ogden
- Gerald Sim played Police Sergeant Pearce

== Publication history ==
The play was first published in 1958 in a paperback edition by Samuel French Ltd as Acting Edition No. 833 priced at six shillings. It was first published in hardback in The Mousetrap and Other Plays by G. P. Putnam's Sons in 1978 (ISBN 0-396-07631-9) and in the UK by HarperCollins in 1993 (ISBN 0-00-224344-X).
