= Astrid Allwyn =

American actress (1905–1978)

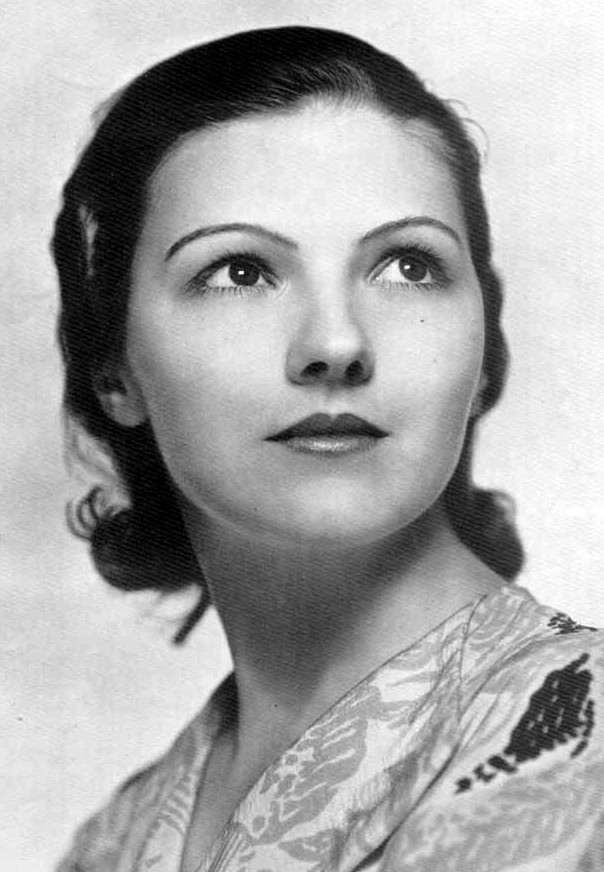
- Allwyn in 1931
- Born: Astrid Christofferson; November 27, 1905; Manchester, Connecticut, U.S.
- Died: March 31, 1978 (aged 72); Los Angeles, California, U.S.
- Resting place: Forest Lawn Memorial Park, Glendale, California
- Occupation: Actress
- Years active: 1929–1943
- Spouses: Robert Kent (m. 1937; div. 1941) Charles O. Fee (m. 1941)
- Children: 2, including Melinda O. Fee

Astrid Allwyn (born Astrid Christofferson; November 27, 1905 – March 31, 1978) was an American stage and film actress.

== Early years ==
Allwyn was born in South Manchester, Connecticut, part of a family that included four sisters and a brother. When she was three years old, her family moved to Springfield, Massachusetts.

At age 13, she sang well enough in a concert to be offered a scholarship to the Boston Conservatory of Music, but she declined rather than move away from her home. After finishing high school, she moved to New York, hoping for a career as a concert singer, but she ended up taking classes at a business college and becoming a typist for a business on Wall Street.

== Career ==
Allwyn studied dancing and dramatics in New York and later joined a stock company. Allwyn made her Broadway debut in 1929 in Elmer Rice's Street Scene. On the strength of her performance in Once in a Lifetime, she was given film work. She signed with Metro-Goldwyn-Mayer and began her screen career.

In films, she often played the woman from whom the male star escaped, for example Charles Boyer's character's fiancée in the 1939 version of Love Affair or James Stewart's mentor's daughter in Mr. Smith Goes to Washington.

== Personal life ==
Her first husband was actor Robert Kent; the two appeared together in the 1936 Shirley Temple film Dimples. They married on January 10, 1937, in Tijuana, Mexico, and were divorced in 1941. She remained married to second spouse, Charles O. Fee, until her death in 1978, at age 72. Two of their daughters, Melinda and Vicki, also became actresses.

== Death ==
On March 31, 1978, Allwyn died of cancer in Los Angeles.

== Complete filmography ==
- West of Broadway (1931) - Young woman (uncredited)
- Lady with a Past (1932) - Lola
- Love Affair (1932) - Linda Lee
- The Night Mayor (1932) - Patsy
- Hat Check Girl (1932) - A Party Guest (uncredited)
- The Girl From Calgary (1932) - Mazie Williams
- Bachelor Mother (1932) - Lola Butler
- The Iron Master (1933) - Flo Lancert
- Hello, Sister! (1933) - Webster's Secretary
- He Couldn't Take It (1933) - Blonde
- Only Yesterday (1933) - (uncredited)
- All of Me (1934) - Ray (uncredited)
- Beggars in Ermine (1934) - Mrs. Vivian Dawson
- Mystery Liner (1934) - Lila Kane
- Monte Carlo Nights (1934) - Blondie Roberts
- Servants' Entrance (1934) - Sigrid Hansen
- The White Parade (1934) - Gertrude Mack
- One More Spring (1935) - Girl at Auction
- The Great Hotel Murder (1935) - Nora, Bookstand Girl (uncredited)
- It's a Small World (1935) - Nancy Naylor
- Dante's Inferno (1935) - Girl in Stoke-Hold (uncredited)
- Accent on Youth (1935) - Genevieve Lang
- Ladies Love Danger (1935) - Chorus Girl (uncredited)
- Way Down East (1935) - Kate
- Hands Across the Table (1935) - Vivian Snowden
- Charlie Chan's Secret (1936) - Janice Gage
- It Had to Happen (1936) - Mabel Spears (scenes cut)
- Follow the Fleet (1936) - Mrs. Iris Manning
- Star for a Night (1936) - Josephine Hall
- Dimples (1936) - Cleo Marsh
- Flying Hostess (1936) - Phyllis Crawford
- Stowaway (1936) - Kay Swift
- Woman-Wise (1937) - "Bubbles" Carson
- Murder Goes to College (1937) - Greta Barry
- Venus Makes Trouble (1937) - Iris Randall
- It Could Happen to You (1937) - Angela
- Love Takes Flight (1937) - Diane Audre
- The Westland Case (1937) - Miss Brentino
- International Crime (1938) - Phoebe Lane
- Love Affair (1939) - Lois Clarke
- Miracles for Sale (1939) - Mrs. Zelma La Claire
- Honeymoon in Bali (1939) - Fortune Teller at Egret Room
- Mr. Smith Goes to Washington (1939) - Susan Paine
- Reno (1939) - Flora McKenzie
- The Lone Wolf Strikes (1940) - Binnie Weldon
- Gangs of Chicago (1940) - Virginia Brandt
- The Leather Pushers (1940) - Pat Danbury
- Meet the Missus (1940) - Violet Stevens
- City of Missing Girls (1941) - Nora Page
- Melody for Three (1941) - Gladys McClelland
- The Hard-Boiled Canary (1941) - Girl (uncredited)
- Puddin' Head (1941) - Yvonne Jones
- Cracked Nuts (1941) - Ethel Mitchell
- Unexpected Uncle (1941) - Sara Cochran
- No Hands on the Clock (1941) - Gypsy Toland
- Hit Parade of 1943 (1943) - Joyce Germaine
