= The Invisible Man (1975 TV series) =

American television series (1975–1976)

- Title card
- Genre: Science fiction
- Created by: Harve Bennett; Steven Bochco
- Starring: David McCallum; Melinda O. Fee; Craig Stevens
- Theme music composer: Henry Mancini
- Composer: Pete Rugolo
- Country of origin: United States
- Original language: English
- No. of seasons: 1
- No. of episodes: 13

Production
- Executive producer: Harve Bennett
- Producers: Steven Bochco; Leslie Stevens
- Running time: 60 minutes
- Production companies: Silverton Productions; Universal Television

Original release
- Network: NBC
- Release: September 8, 1975 – January 26, 1976

The Invisible Man, the second television series with this title, debuted in the United States in 1975 on NBC and starred David McCallum as the scientist Daniel Westin and Melinda Fee as his wife, Dr. Kate Westin. The series was created by Harve Bennett and Steven Bochco. A pilot TV movie initially aired in May 1975 and was followed by a 12-episode series later that year. A TV tie-in novel (also called The Invisible Man) based on the script of the pilot episode was written by Michael Jahn and published by Fawcett Gold Medal in 1975.

== Plot ==
=== The pilot ===
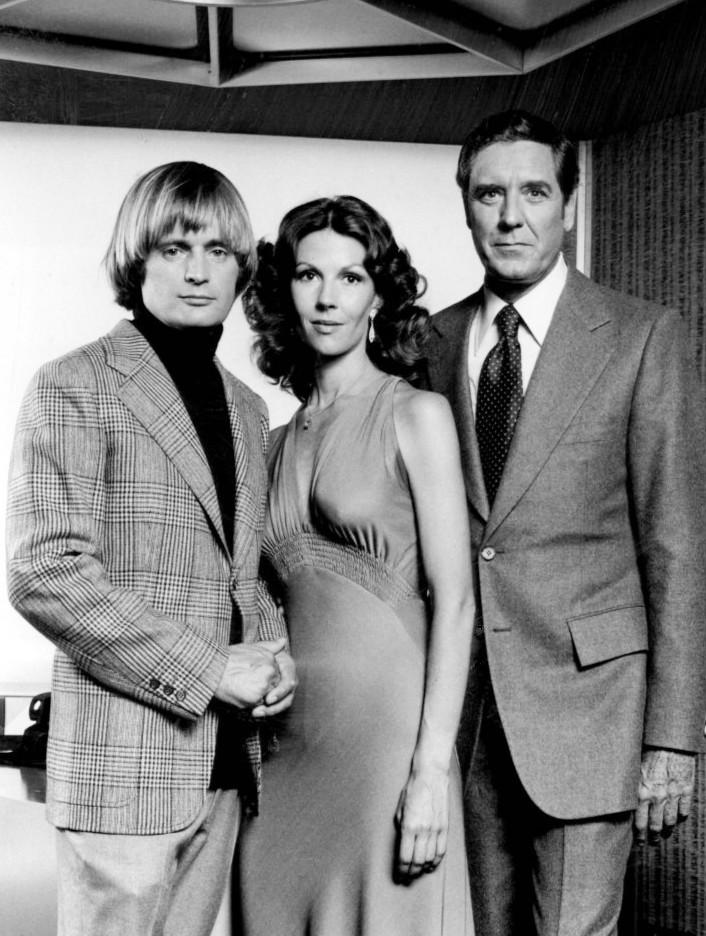
David McCallum, Melinda Fee and Craig Stevens

Inspired by the original 1897 novel by H. G. Wells, the pilot film depicts Daniel Westin (David McCallum) working for a company called the Klae Corporation, which is doing experiments in teleportation. He discovers the side effect of his work is the ability to turn objects invisible and tries to find medical applications for his invention. He discovers that objects that are made invisible reappear after a few hours, and on living test animals the collars they wear re-appear before the living cells themselves. Obsessed by his invention, Westin decides to become invisible himself, in part to prove that a human can survive the process, and also to test a serum he has developed to reverse the invisibility.

He reveals the process to his boss, Walter Carlson (Jackie Cooper), who is initially unimpressed by what he sees as millions spent on a nuclear disintegrator, but he becomes more interested when he realizes that the pen Westin disintegrated is actually still there ("Do you know what you've got here?" "An invisible pen..." "Cute. No, invisible armies..."). He wants to back the project for military purposes, and in the course of the argument it is revealed that the Pentagon has provided the funding for Westin's research; in effect the military already own the process. Westin tries to destroy his invention by sneaking into the lab after hours and deleting his research. In order to make his escape he becomes invisible for a second time, before triggering an overload and destroying the apparatus. But it appears that after all the process is unstable, and he becomes only briefly visible before turning permanently invisible; he cannot return to his visible state any longer, and the serum is ineffective. He goes to his friend, Dr. Nick Maggio (Henry Darrow), a skilled plastic surgeon who creates a disguise for him in the form of a face mask and a pair of gloves using a special material called Dermaplex that has the same properties as human skin, which enable Westin to appear in public. The Dermaplex side effect is that Westin has to remove the mask from time to time because, as Dr. Maggio states, "The beard will be your enemy, and the itch will drive you crazy."

By the conclusion of the pilot, the process's lack of stability renders it effectively useless for commercial or military applications, and the Klae Corporation is persuaded to re-employ him in his research capacity despite his condition, and thus the series begins from this point. Westin seeks to perfect his work and at the same time find a cure—a means of restoring his visibility.

=== The series ===
There were differences between the pilot and the series. The pilot depicts Westin as a tragic figure, the "victim" of the invisibility process; despite his continued efforts, he essentially remains invisible all the time and must use technology to "fake" being visible.

The series was lighter and more humorous, featuring invisibility-related gags and scenarios (in the case of the latter, many of these were depicted in the opening title sequence—such as a telephone receiver rising unsupported off its hook and a Jeep driving itself, to name but two), and ignoring the tragic side of Westin's predicament. The first post-pilot episode indicates that Westin and his wife Kate have been working as agents for some time. Indeed, the character's invisibility was utilized as the Klae Resource of the show's introduction; an invisible man can go places and do things that the visible cannot accomplish.

Another difference is in the area of casting; in the pilot, Jackie Cooper portrayed Westin's superior, Walter Carlson, but for the series, the role was recast with Craig Stevens playing the part. The character was also altered to be more sympathetic and closer to the Oscar Goldman archetype.

Like its late 1950s predecessor, H.G. Wells' Invisible Man, the episodes featured sequences of the camera taking on Westin's point of view, showing whoever and/or whatever the character himself was seeing at the time.

The Invisible Man featured episodes that were episodic in that, save the pilot, the series episodes could be viewed in any order. However, the show was canceled after one season due to low ratings before the underlying arc of Westin curing his invisibility and returning to normality could be resolved. For the following season, NBC did however commission a near-identical series in terms of premise, entitled Gemini Man.

== Cast ==
- David McCallum as Dr. Daniel Westin
- Melinda O. Fee as Kate Westin
- Jackie Cooper as Walter Carlson (pilot episode only)
- Craig Stevens as Walter Carlson
- Henry Darrow as Dr. Nick Maggio (pilot episode only)
- Charles Aidman as Dr. Nick Maggio ("An Attempt to Save Face" only)

== Production ==
The series was shot on film, but the blue screen special effects were shot on video using "Image 655", a special 24 frame/sec 655 line video system based on modified NTSC cameras and videotape recorders, as this was much cheaper and faster than using traditional film-based blue screen effects. The videotaped effects shots were transferred to film and edited into the finished episodes.

== Episodes ==
No.	Title	Directed by	Written by		Original release date
Pilot	"The Invisible Man"	Robert Michael Lewis	Harve Bennett; Steven Bochco	Jackie Cooper, Henry Darrow, Milt Kogan	May 6, 1975
1	"The Klae Resource"	Robert Michael Lewis	Steven Bochco	Conrad Janis, James Karen	September 8, 1975
2	"The Fine Art Of Diplomacy"	Sigmund Neufeld Jr.	James D. Parriott	Ross Martin, Paul Stewart	September 15, 1975
3	"Man of Influence"	Alan J. Levi	Rick Blaine; Seeleg Lester	Loni Anderson, John Vernon	September 22, 1975
4	"Eyes Only"	Alan J. Levi	Leslie Stevens	Thayer David	September 29, 1975
5	"Barnard Wants Out"	Alan J. Levi	James D. Parriott	Nehemiah Persoff	October 6, 1975
6	"Go Directly to Jail"	Sigmund Neufeld Jr.	Steven Bochco	James McEachin	November 3, 1975
7	"Stop When Red Lights Flash"	Gene Nelson	Seeleg Lester	Scott Brady	November 24, 1975
8	"Pin Money"	Alan J. Levi	James D. Parriott	Helen Kleeb	December 1, 1975
9	"The Klae Dynasty"	Alan J. Levi	Philip DeGuere	Peter Donat	December 8, 1975
10	"Sight Unseen"	Sigmund Neufeld Jr.	Kandy Rehak; Brian Rehak	Al Ruscio	December 15, 1975
11	"Power Play"	Alan J. Levi	Leslie Stevens	Monte Markham	January 19, 1976
12	"An Attempt to Save Face"	Don Henderson	James D. Parriott; Leslie Stevens	Charles Aidman	January 26, 1976

== International broadcasting ==
The series aired on BBC1 in the UK, starting later in September 1975. It was shown on French TV (TF1) in 1976. It was also dubbed in Persian and broadcast on NIRT 2 (Iran) in 1978. It was also dubbed in Italian and broadcast on various channels in Italy in the early 1980s. It was broadcast in Finland in 1976, with original soundtrack and Finnish subtitles. It was broadcast in Australia in 1976. The series was shown on Brazilian television thru TV Gazeta in 1978. The series reaired on TV Record in 1980.

== Home media ==
On February 21, 2012, Visual Entertainment released The Invisible Man: The Complete Series on DVD in Region 1 and on Blu-ray in Region A in Canada for the first time. In the US, the DVD release was on May 1, 2012, and the Blu-ray release on June 19, 2012, and distributed by Millennium Entertainment.

In Region 4, the series was released on DVD in Australia on August 15, 2012, and in New Zealand on September 13, 2012, and distributed by Madman Entertainment.

In Region 2, the series was released on DVD in the UK on 8 July 2013 and distributed by Acorn Media UK.
