= Rosemary Ames =

American actress (1906–1988)

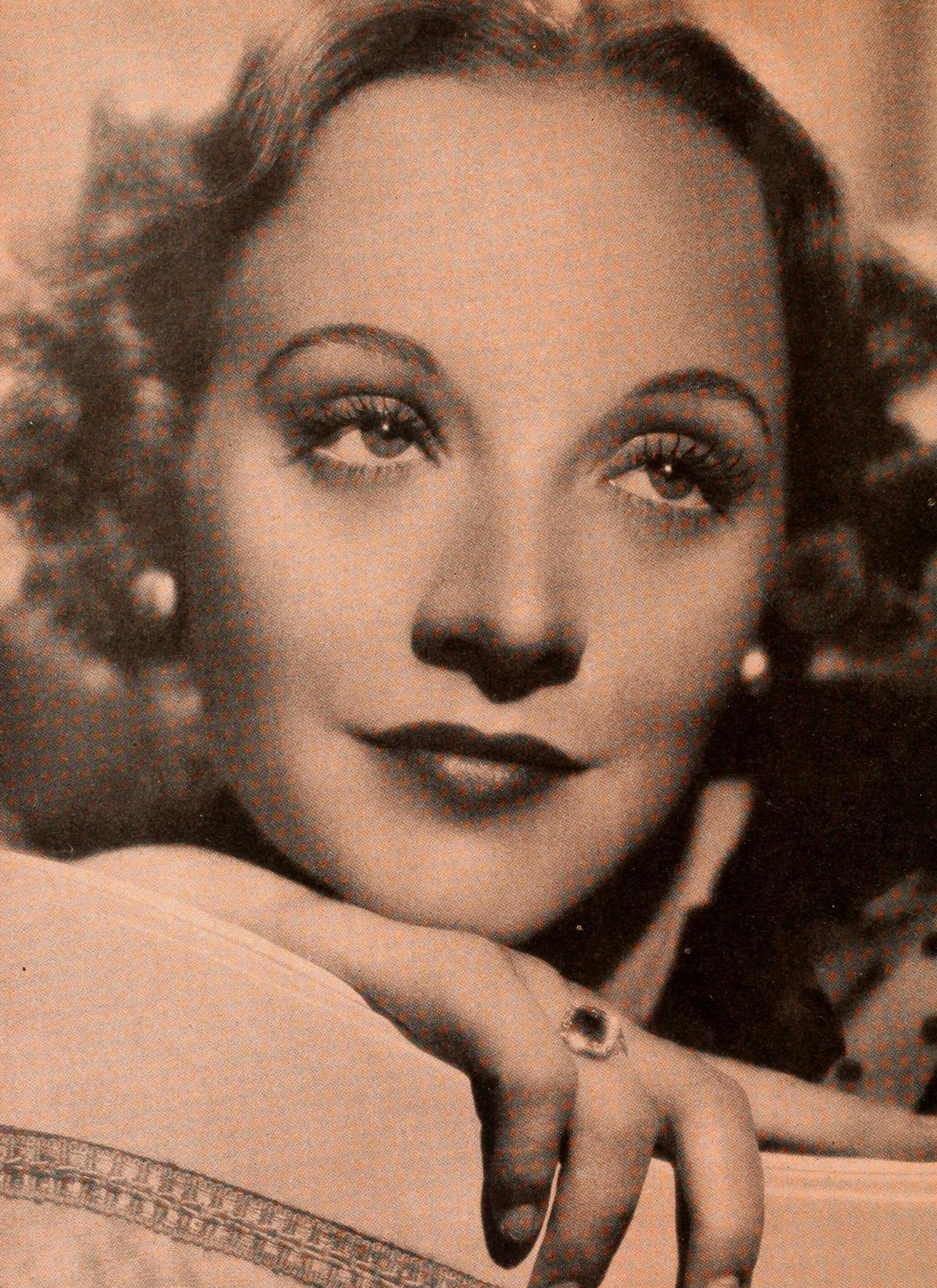
- Ames in 1935
- Born: December 11, 1906; Evanston, Illinois, U.S.
- Died: April 15, 1988 (aged 81); Truth or Consequences, New Mexico
- Occupation: Film actress
- Spouses: E. Ogden Ketting (died) Bertie Alexander Meyer (divorced) Abner Stillwell (divorced)

Rosemary Ames (December 11, 1906 – April 15, 1988) was an American film actress who had a brief career in the early 1930s.

Ames's father was Knowlton L. Ames, president of Booth Fisheries Company and owner of two newspapers.

== Career ==
Before Ames began working in films, she acted on stage for several years in London, including a production of Five Star Final.

She starred in Mr. Quincey of Monte Carlo in 1933, again playing the lead role opposite John Stuart. In 1934 she starred in I Believed in You, Such Women Are Dangerous, and Pursued.

Her first premier role was alongside Janet Gaynor and Warner Baxter in the 1935 film One More Spring. She followed that starring opposite Edmund Lowe and Victor McLaglen in The Great Hotel Murder, and opposite Shirley Temple and Joel McCrea in Our Little Girl that same year.

== Marriages ==
Ames married E. Ogden Ketting, and they had one child, a daughter Julie Brosseau. She married British theatre manager Bertie Alexander Meyer on January 6, 1932, in London. On March 28, 1935, Ames divorced Meyer. Two hours later she married bank executive Abner J. Stilwell. They were divorced on October 22, 1937.

== Filmography ==
- Love on the Spot (1932)
- Mr. Quincey of Monte Carlo (1933)
- Pursued (1934)
- I Believed in You (1934)
- Such Women Are Dangerous (1934)
- One More Spring (1935)
- The Great Hotel Murder (1935)
- Our Little Girl (1935)
