= I Believed in You =

1934 film by Irving Cummings

- Directed by: Irving Cummings
- Screenplay by: William M. Conselman
- Story by: William Anthony McGuire
- Starring: Rosemary Ames; John Boles; Victor Jory; Gertrude Michael; George Meeker; Leslie Fenton
- Cinematography: Barney McGill
- Edited by: Alfred DeGaetano
- Music by: Samuel Kaylin
- Production company: Fox Film Corporation
- Distributed by: Fox Film Corporation
- Release date: February 23, 1934
- Running time: 69 minutes
- Country: United States
- Language: English

I Believed in You is a 1934 American pre-Code drama film directed by Irving Cummings and written by William M. Conselman. The film stars Rosemary Ames, John Boles, Victor Jory, Gertrude Michael, George Meeker and Leslie Fenton. The film was released on February 23, 1934, by Fox Film Corporation.

== Cast ==
- Rosemary Ames as True Merrill
- John Boles as Michael Harrison
- Victor Jory as Jim Crowl
- Gertrude Michael as Pamela Banks
- George Meeker as Saracen Jones
- Leslie Fenton as Russell Storm
- Joyzelle Joyner as Vavara
- Jed Prouty as Joe Long
- Morgan Wallace as Oliver Lang
- Luis Alberni as Giacomo
- Frederik Vogeding as Reno
- Walter Walker as Lacy
- Arthur Housman as Jerry Hartman
- Louise Beavers as Prisoner
- Robert Walker as Detective
- Ferdinand Gottschalk as Musician
- Wini Shaw as Crowl's Girlfriend
- Kay Hammond as Poetess
- Gilbert Emery as Pamela's Friend
- Lenita Lane as Novelist
- Vadim Uraneff as Candy Vendor
- Niles Welch as Painter
- Reginald Simpson as Auto Salesman
- Charles C. Wilson as Magistrate
- Ralph Emerson as Sculptor
