= The Unwelcome Stranger =

1935 US film directed by Phil Rosen

- DVD cover of the film
- Directed by: Phil Rosen
- Screenplay by: Crane Wilbur; William Jacobs
- Story by: William Jacobs
- Produced by: Bryan Foy
- Starring: Jack Holt; Mona Barrie; Ralph Morgan
- Cinematography: John Stumar
- Edited by: Arthur Hilton
- Music by: Abe Meyer
- Production company: Columbia Pictures
- Release date: April 20, 1935 (US)
- Running time: 67 minutes
- Country: United States
- Language: English

The Unwelcome Stranger is a 1935 American drama film directed by Phil Rosen and starring Jack Holt, Mona Barrie, and Ralph Morgan. It was released on April 20, 1935.

== Cast ==
- Jack Holt as Howard Chamberlain
- Mona Barrie as Madeleine Chamberlain
- Ralph Morgan as Mike Monahan
- Jackie Searl as Andy "Gimpy" Campbell
- Bradley Page as Lucky Palmer
- Frankie Darro as Charlie Anderson
- Sam McDaniel as Pot Roast
- Frank Orth as Jackson
