= C. K. Alexander =

Egyptian actor (1923-1980)

- Born: May 4, 1923; Egypt
- Died: September 2, 1980 (aged 57); New York City
- Education: Cairo University, American University in Cairo
- Occupations: Actor, director, composer
- Years active: 1923 - 1980

C. K. Alexander (May 4, 1923 – September 2, 1980) was an Egyptian actor, director, composer, and playwright. Of Syro-Lebanese descent, he was born as Charles Khalil Alexander (the first name of his father) Saad in Cairo, Egypt, on May 4, 1923. C.K. attended Cairo University from 1938 to 1939 and the American University in Cairo from 1940 to 1941. He changed his name to Charles Khalil Alexander after moving to the United States in 1942.

== Acting career ==
C.K. made his professional acting debut in the role of Khadja in a production of The Merry Widow at the Cairo Royal Opera House in 1942. While in Egypt, he was a member of the New Vic Players and of the Cairo Dramatic and Musical Society. C.K. went on to make his Broadway debut in 1946 at the Plymouth Theatre in the role of Steward in Hidden Horizon, a production that would close after just twelve performances. After Hidden Horizon, C.K. directed a season of summer stock theatre in Duxbury, Massachusetts. He did not return to Broadway until 1950 when he appeared in the role of Uncle Louis in The Happy Time, again at the Plymouth Theatre.

He appeared on television in The Defenders, The Adams Chronicles, and The Scarlet Letter. Alexander founded two non-profit Off Broadway groups: the Company of Twelve and Theater Explorations Inc. C.K. died in New York City on September 2, 1980.

== Composing career ==
C.K. composed under his own name and under the pseudonyms Mario Quimber and Basheer Qadar. He composed music for Francesca da Rimini, The Campbells of Boston, As Happy As Kings, Harlequinades for the Mourners, and The Justice Box. He also wrote the entire score for The Applegates, a play he would appear in at The Public Theater in 1978.
