= The Great Hotel Murder =

1935 film

- Directed by: Eugene Forde
- Written by: Arthur Kober
- Based on: Recipe for Murder by Vincent Starrett
- Produced by: John Stone
- Starring: Edmund Lowe; Victor McLaglen; Rosemary Ames; Mary Carlisle
- Cinematography: Ernest Palmer
- Music by: Samuel Kaylin
- Production company: Fox Film Corporation
- Distributed by: Fox Film Corporation
- Release date: February 27, 1935
- Running time: 70 minutes
- Country: United States
- Language: English

The Great Hotel Murder is a 1935 American mystery film directed by Eugene Forde and starring Edmund Lowe, Victor McLaglen, Rosemary Ames and Mary Carlisle. It is based on Recipe for Murder a 1934 story by Vincent Starrett.

The film stars Lowe and McLaglen as rival sleuths, with supporting roles for Lynn Bari and Madge Bellamy. It was one of a series of films featuring Lowe and McLaglen as friendly rivals dating back to their first pairing in the hit 1926 silent film What Price Glory?.

It was produced by Fox Film, shortly before the merger with Twentieth Century Pictures. The film's sets were designed by the art director Duncan Cramer.

== Cast ==
- Edmund Lowe as Roger Blackwood
- Victor McLaglen as Andrew W. 'Andy' McCabe
- Rosemary Ames as Eleanor Blake
- Mary Carlisle as Olive Temple
- Henry O'Neill as Mr. Harvey
- C. Henry Gordon as Dr. John M. Temple
- William Janney as Harry Prentice
- Charles C. Wilson as Anthony Wilson
- John Wray as Feets Moore
- John Qualen as Ole
- Herman Bing as Hans
- Madge Bellamy as Tessie
- Robert Gleckler as Police Captain
- Clarence Wilson as Girando
- Betty Bryson as Irene Harvey
- Mary Alden as Mrs. Harvey
- Walter Walker as Dr. Chambers
- Sumner Getchell as Bunny
- Astrid Allwyn as Nora, Bookstand Girl
- Larry Steers as Henry, Hotel Clerk
- Gino Corrado as Head Waiter
- Alphonse Martell as Head Waiter
- Selmer Jackson as Railroad Ticket Agent
- Lynn Bari as Wilson's Receptionist
- Martin Faust as Waiter
- Otto Hoffman as Station Agent
- Landers Stevens as Hotel Doorman
- Ralph McCullough as Hotel Clerk
