= Mystery Woman (film) =

1935 film by Eugene Forde

- Directed by: Eugene Forde
- Screenplay by: Philip MacDonald
- Story by: Dudley Nichols; Edward E. Paramore Jr.
- Produced by: John Stone
- Starring: Mona Barrie; Gilbert Roland; John Halliday; Rod La Rocque; Mischa Auer; Billy Bevan
- Cinematography: Ernest Palmer
- Production company: Fox Film Corporation
- Distributed by: Fox Film Corporation
- Release date: January 8, 1935
- Running time: 69 minutes
- Country: United States
- Language: English

Mystery Woman is a 1935 American thriller film directed by Eugene Forde and written by Philip MacDonald. The film stars Mona Barrie, Gilbert Roland, John Halliday, Rod La Rocque, Mischa Auer and Billy Bevan. The film was released on January 8, 1935, Fox Film Corporation.

== Plot ==
Top-secret documents being transported by French captain Jacques Benoit are stolen in Constantinople, resulting in his arrest and sentencing to Devil's Island. Determined to vindicate him, wife Margaret learns that Jacques had met wealthy Dr. Van Wyke in transit. Suspecting him, she books passage on an ocean liner to New York City under an assumed name and schemes to meet Van Wyke during the voyage.

Attracting romantic interest from passenger Juan Santanda as well as from Van Wyke, she finds the stolen documents and tries to hide them. Santanda turns out to be a jewel thief. When she explains her true identity and purpose, he uses a blowtorch to open a safe and help her retrieve the documents, then sacrifices his own life when she is trapped, staying behind as he and Van Wyke kill one another. Jacques Benoit is released and presented the Legion of Honor medal.

== Cast ==
- Mona Barrie as Margaret Benoit
- Gilbert Roland as Juan Santanda
- John Halliday as Dr. Theodore Van Wyke
- Rod La Rocque as Jacques Benoit
- Mischa Auer as Dmitri
- Billy Bevan as Jepson
- William Faversham as Cambon
- Howard Lang as Bergstrom
- George Barraud as Stanton
- Arno Frey as Schultz
