= Here Comes Trouble (1936 film) =

1936 film by Lewis Seiler

- Directed by: Lewis Seiler
- Written by: John Bright; Robert Ellis; Helen Logan; Robert Tasker; Barry Trivers
- Produced by: John Stone
- Starring: Paul Kelly; Arline Judge; Mona Barrie
- Cinematography: Harry Jackson
- Edited by: Louis R. Loeffler
- Music by: Samuel Kaylin
- Production company: 20th Century Fox
- Release date: February 21, 1936
- Running time: 62 minutes
- Country: United States
- Language: English

Here Comes Trouble is a 1936 American comedy film directed by Lewis Seiler, starring Paul Kelly, Arline Judge and Mona Barrie. The film was released on February 21, 1936, by 20th Century Fox. Duke Donovan unknowingly becomes tangled up with jewel thieves when he is give a cigarette lighter containing some stolen ruby.

== Cast ==
- Paul Kelly as Duke Donovan
- Arline Judge as Margie Simpson
- Mona Barrie as Evelyn Howard
- Gregory Ratoff as Ivan Petroff
- Sammy Cohen as Grimy
- Edward Brophy as Crowley
- Halliwell Hobbes as Professor Howard
- Andrew Tombes as Adams
- Ernie Alexander as Harry Goodfellow
- George Chandler as Brooks - Purser
