= One More Spring =

1935 American comedy film

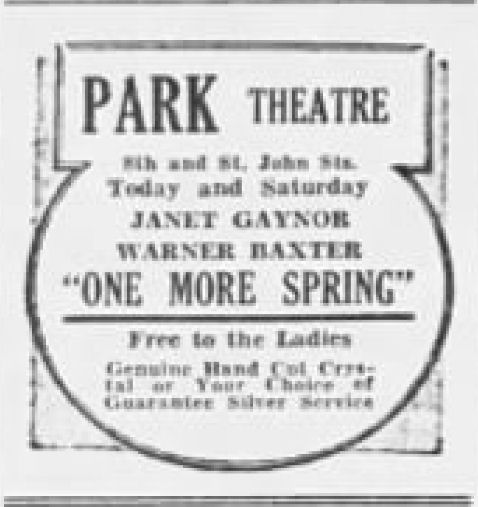
- Newspaper advertisement
- Directed by: Henry King
- Written by: Edwin J. Burke
- Based on: One More Spring by Robert Nathan
- Produced by: Winfield R. Sheehan
- Starring: Janet Gaynor; Warner Baxter; Walter Woolf King
- Cinematography: John F. Seitz
- Edited by: Harold D. Schuster
- Music by: Jimmy Grier; Coy Poe
- Distributed by: Fox Film Corporation
- Release date: February 15, 1935
- Running time: 87 minutes
- Country: United States
- Language: English

One More Spring is a 1935 American comedy drama film about three people, played by Janet Gaynor, Warner Baxter, and Walter Woolf King, living together in a tool room at Central Park as an alternative to being homeless. The film was written by Edwin J. Burke from the Robert Nathan novel of the same name and directed by Henry King.

== Plot ==
In New York City, Jaret Oktar's antiques shop fails. Actress Elizabeth Cheney attends the auction of his stock, just to pass the time and sit down, while concert violinist Morris Rosenberg shows up after it ends. All three are out of work and homeless. Otkar offers Rosenberg half of a bed Napoleon slept on (the only unsold item); they take it to the park on a pushcart and sleep on it outside under the stars. Meanwhile, Cheney sleeps on the subway.

While Otkar looks for a more permanent place for the bed, Rosenberg decides to practice. Cheney happens along and offers to pass the hat afterward. He is insulted at the thought of playing for pennies, but after she leaves, he swallows his pride. After a performance, street sweeper Mr. Sweeney expresses his desire to learn how to play a particular tune; seizing the opportunity, Otkar offers him lessons from Rosenberg for a place to put their bed. Sweeney has a tool room in a stable in the park.

After they settle in, Otkar goes looking for food. While trying to steal a cooked chicken from a fancy restaurant, he runs into Cheney, who has purloined some celery. Eventually, she persuades him to take her in. Rosenberg objects, but gives in.

The next day, Otkar has Rosenberg distract a zoo attendant with music so he can steal some of the meat intended for the lions. Afterward, Sweeney takes Rosenberg to the bank where his wife works and where they have their savings. Rosenberg envies Mr. Sheridan, the bank president, unaware that Sheridan has his own troubles: the bank is in danger of failing.

That night, Sheridan unsuccessfully begs an associate for help before the bank examiners check his books the next day. Sheridan's bank does indeed close, taking the Sweeneys' savings with it. The banker tries to drown himself, but the water is too shallow, and Otkar pulls him out of the mud. Otkar and Cheney persuade him to go back, face his depositors and try to salvage something.

The trio make it through the winter. When spring comes, Rosenberg has exciting news. He has gotten work with a symphony orchestra out of town. When he leaves, Otkar decides it would not be right for an unmarried man and woman to live together, so he decides to head south and leave the place and the bed to Cheney. Then Sheridan shows up. The government is going to bail out his bank, and the Sweeneys will not lose their savings. Furthermore, he wants to buy the bed. With the proceeds, Otkar finally has something to offer Cheney; he calls her "darling" for the first time and embraces her.

== Cast ==
- Janet Gaynor as Elizabeth Cheney
- Warner Baxter as Jaret Otkar
- Walter Woolf King as Morris Rosenberg (billed as Walter King)
- Jane Darwell as Mrs. [Mary] Sweeney
- Roger Imhof as Mr. [Michael] Sweeney
- Grant Mitchell as Mr. Sheridan
- Rosemary Ames as Miss Weber
- John Qualen as Auctioneer
- Dick Foran as Park Policeman
- Stepin Fetchit as Zoo Attendant
- Astrid Allwyn as Girl at Auction
- Lee Kohlmar as Flute Player
- Charles Lane as Representative (uncredited)
- William H. Strauss as Jewish Man (uncredited)

== Reception ==
Andre Sennwald gave the movie a highly favorable review in The New York Times, describing it as "a wryly amusing and warmly sentimental screen comedy, skillfully adapted by Edwin Burke and expertly directed by Henry King." While he praised the two stars, he wrote that "the most enkindling performances in "One More Spring," however, are provided by less eminent players", singling out King, Imhof, Darwell and Fetchit.

== Radio adaptation ==
One More Spring was presented on Lux Summer Theatre June 29, 1953. Jeanne Crain starred in the one-hour adaptation.
