= Our Little Girl =

1935 film by John S. Robertson

- Theatrical release poster
- Directed by: John S. Robertson
- Written by: Stephen Morehouse Avery (adaptation); Arthur J. Beckhard (screenplay); Florence Leighton Pflazgraf; Allen Rivkin
- Produced by: Edward Butcher
- Starring: Shirley Temple; Rosemary Ames; Joel McCrea
- Cinematography: John F. Seitz
- Music by: R.H. Bassett; Peter Brunelli
- Distributed by: Fox Film Corporation
- Release date: May 17, 1935
- Running time: 65 min
- Country: United States
- Language: English

Our Little Girl is a 1935 American drama film directed by John S. Robertson and starring Shirley Temple and Joel McCrea.

Unlike Temple's other films of this period, the film includes no dancing and only one song, and she does not play an orphan.

== Plot ==
Dr. Don Middleton is so immersed in his work that he neglects his wife Elsa, who begins spending more time with her husband's best friend. Don and Elsa divorce, ignorant of the effect on their daughter Molly. When Elsa remarries, Molly runs away from home.

== Cast ==
- Shirley Temple as Molly Middleton
- Rosemary Ames as Elsa Middleton
- Joel McCrea as Dr. Donald Middleton
- Lyle Talbot as Rolfe Brent
- Erin O'Brien-Moore as Sarah Boynton
- J. Farrell MacDonald as Hobo
- Poodles Hanneford as Circus Performer
- Margaret Armstrong as Amy
- Rita Owin as Alice
- Leonard Carey as Jackson
- Jack Baxley as Leyton (uncredited)
- Jack Donohue as Actor (uncredited)
- Gus Van as Magician (uncredited)

== Production ==
The film's original title was Heaven's Gate, but Fox changed it before release, fearing that people would confuse the title with the name of a cemetery. In her memoirs, Temple recalled that two of her false teeth fell from her mouth and could not be located, resulting in the cancellation of production for the day. On another occasion, a delay on set caused Temple to wet herself and she became embarrassed, refusing to leave her dressing room until her mother convinced her to emerge.
