= Love on the Spot =

1932 film

- Directed by: Graham Cutts
- Written by: Herman C. McNeile (novel); Reginald Purdell; John Paddy Carstairs
- Produced by: Basil Dean
- Starring: Rosemary Ames; Richard Dolman; Aubrey Mather; Helen Ferrers
- Cinematography: Hal Young
- Music by: Ernest Irving
- Production company: Associated Talking Pictures
- Distributed by: RKO Pictures
- Release date: July 1932
- Running time: 64 minutes
- Country: United Kingdom
- Language: English

Love on the Spot is a 1932 British musical film directed by Graham Cutts and starring Rosemary Ames, Richard Dolman and Aubrey Mather.

== Plot ==
Two criminals are reformed when they meet and fall in love.

== Cast ==
- Rosemary Ames as Joan Prior
- Richard Dolman as Bill Maitland
- Aubrey Mather as Mr. Prior
- Helen Ferrers as Lady Witchell
- W. Cronin Wilson as Inspector MacAndrews
- Patrick Ludlow as Mr. Terrington
- Hubert Leslie as Manager
- Margery Binner as Maid
- John Singer as Pageboy
- Patrick Susands as Cartwright

== Bibliography ==
- Low, Rachael. Filmmaking in 1930s Britain. George Allen & Unwin, 1985.
- Perry, George. Forever Ealing. Pavilion Books, 1994.
