= Murder on the Nile =

1944 play by Agatha Christie

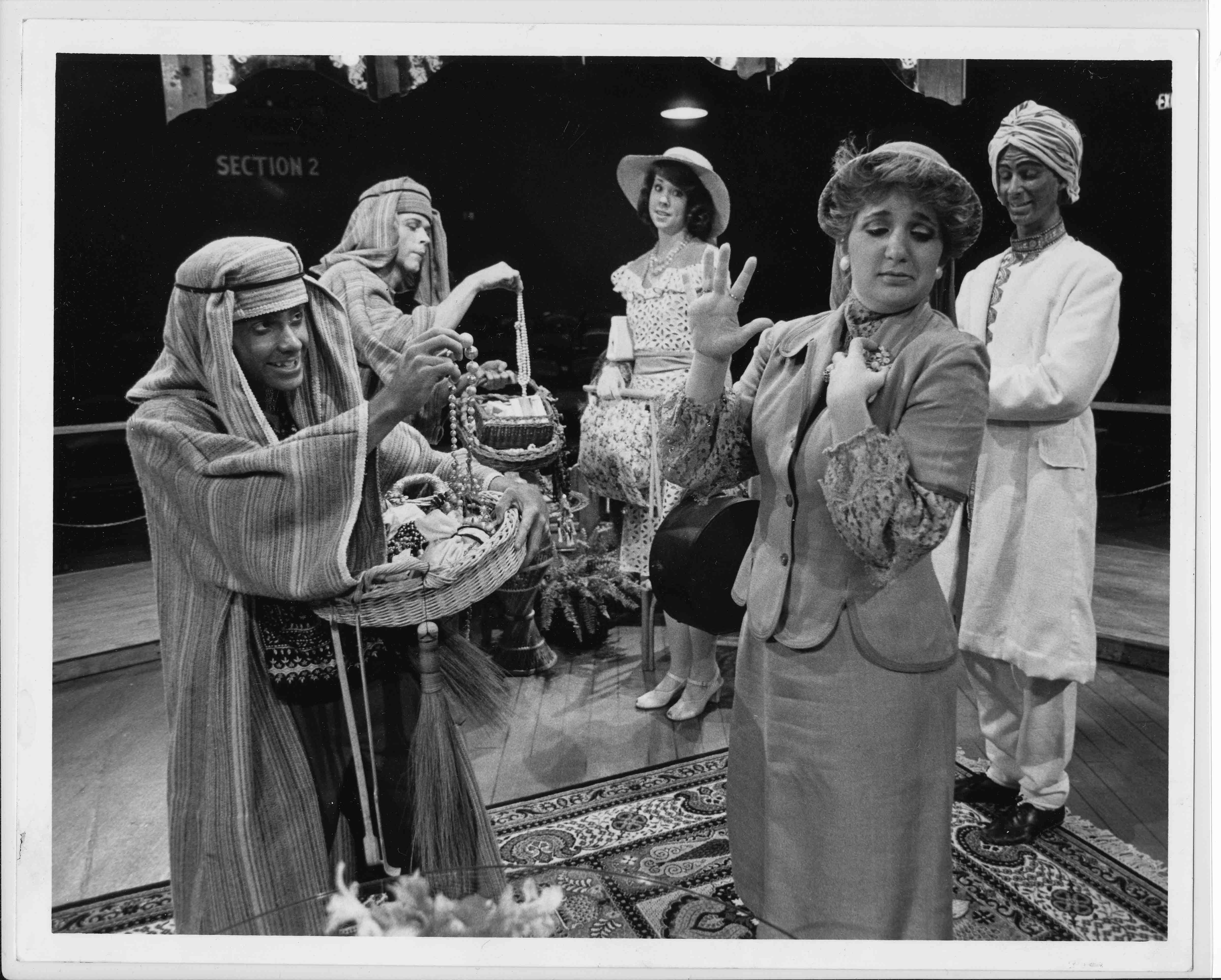
- A production of the play by the Department of Theater and Dance at Otterbein University, 1985
- Original language: English
- Written by: Agatha Christie
- Characters: Beadsellers; Steward; Helen Ffoliot-ffoulkes; Christina Grant; Smith; Louise; Dr. Bessner; Kay Mostyn; Simon Mostyn; Canon Pennefather; Jacqueline de Severac; McNaught

Premiere
- Date: 17 January 1944

Murder on the Nile (sometimes titled Hidden Horizon) is a 1944 murder mystery play by crime writer Agatha Christie, based on her 1937 novel Death on the Nile.

== Background ==
The play is based on her 1937 novel Death on the Nile which in itself started off as a play that Christie called Moon on the Nile. Once written, she decided it would be better as a book and she only resurrected the play version in 1942 when she was in the middle of writing the theatrical version of And Then There Were None and her actor friend Francis L. Sullivan was looking for a play in which Hercule Poirot might feature. Discussions took place until October as Christie was tired of the character of Poirot and wanted to exclude him from the drama altogether. She managed to persuade Sullivan of this plan when she promised to write into the play the part of a church canon.

Once backing had been located, rehearsals for the play started in January 1944 in Dundee where Christie enthusiastically joined, now that she was thoroughly enamoured of the theatre and its people. It premiered there on 17 January at the Dundee Repertory Theatre and the title of the play had also been changed to Hidden Horizon. For reasons not specified in her biography, these rehearsals and the plans to stage the play appear to have suffered delays to find a London theatre to take the show, once it had been tried out in the provinces. Matters were not helped by the mediocre critical reaction to Appointment with Death when that play opened in March 1945. A further issue was the objection of an official from the Ministry of Labour to the presence of a maid in the cast of characters.

The play, with the name Murder on the Nile, finally opened in the West End on 19 March 1946 at the Ambassadors Theatre, where six years later, The Mousetrap would open. By this time, Sullivan was no longer in the cast.

The play features fewer characters who were derived from some of the book's characters. Marie Van Schuyler and Mrs. Allerton are merged into the character of Helen ffoliot-ffoulkes while Cornelia Robson, Miss Bowers and Rosalie Otterbourne become Christina Grant. William Smith is a combination of Mr. Ferguson and Tim Allerton and the three characters of Hercule Poriot, Andrew Pennington and Jim Fanthorp become Canon Ambrose Pennefather. In addition, Simon Doyle's surname changes to Mostyn, Linnet Ridgeway is now Kay, and Jacqueline de Bellefort becomes Jacqueline de Severac. The characters of Salome Otterbourne, Signor Richetti and Colonel Race are dropped from the plot.

== Scenes ==
Act 1: On the paddle steamer Lotus in late afternoon.

Act 2
Scene 1: The same; three days later.
Scene 2: The same; five minutes later.

Act 3: The same; the following morning.

== Characters ==
The characters in Murder on the Nile are as follows:

- Beadsellers, pesky peddlers of cheap trinkets
- Steward, the head waiter
- Miss Helen ffoliot-ffoulkes, a wealthy snob
- Christina Grant, her niece
- William Smith, a wise-cracking socialist
- Louise, Kay Mostyn's maid
- Dr Bessner, a psychologist and physician
- Kay Mostyn, the "richest girl in England"
- Simon Mostyn, Kay's husband
- Canon Ambrose Pennefather, Kay's uncle and guardian
- Jacqueline de Severac, Kay's ex-best friend and Simon's ex-fiancée
- McNaught, the Lotus's captain

== Reception of London production ==
Ivor Brown reviewed the play positively in the 24 March 1946 issue of The Observer: "As far as plot (intricate, of course) is concerned, the new Agatha Christie play might as well have tipped its corpses into the Thames. But Egypt offers the scene-painter a better chance (nicely taken by Danae Gaylen) and the off-stage tattoo of African percussion-music. The piece has the proper excitements of its hard-worked kind; a weakness lies in its blending of the usual mystery-mechanism with unusual human emotion. We have come to take our murders lightly in this kind of theatre; consequently a serious ending, with the guilty party nobly declining an obvious suicide at sacerdotal urgence, the better to find salvation via the scaffold, is too momentous a finale for so light a morsel of play-making. The previous and familiar appurtenance of clue and counter-clue one contentedly accepts: all this is apt enough – but must there be heaven, too? We leave with a sense of conflict. Has not the Oo-dun-it or Egyptian Butcher-bird been devoured in the last minute, by an 'Allegory on the Banks of the Nile'?"

The play was reviewed in the Daily Mirror on 21 March 1946 by Bernard Buckham who said, "An Agatha Christie play, but a poor one. Various acts of violence on a pleasure steamer and it becomes a question of 'who murdered the bride?' At this time of day such a set-ups needs to have character interest, ingenuity of plot, and excitement. This piece falls down on them all. Most of the acting fireworks fall to the lot of Vivienne Bennett, and she touches them off very cleverly."

=== Credits of London production ===
Director: Claude Gurney

Cast

- Richard Spranger
- Christmas Grose
- James Roberts
- Helen Haye
- Joanna Derrill
- Ronald Miller
- Jacqueline Robert
- Hugo Schuster
- Ivan Brandt
- Rosemary Scott
- David Horne
- Vivienne Bennett
- Walter Lindsay

== Broadway production ==
Titled Hidden Horizon, the play opened at the Plymouth Theater in New York on 19 September 1946, but only ran for twelve performances before closing on 28 September.

=== Credits of Broadway production ===
Director: Albert de Courville

Cast

- C. K. Alexander as Steward
- David Andrews as Bead Seller
- Monty Banks Jr. as Bead Seller
- Diana Barrymore as Jacqueline De Severac
- Blair Davies as Simon Mostyn
- Leland Hamilton as Egyptian Policeman
- Halliwell Hobbes as Archdeacon Pennyfeather
- Barbara Joyce as Kay Mostyn
- Edith Kingdon Gould as Louise
- Eva Leonard-Boyne as Miss ffoliot-ffoulkes
- David Manners as Smith
- Damian Nimer as Egyptian Policeman
- Joy Ann Page as Christina Grant
- Winston Ross as McNaught
- Peter Von Zerneck as Dr. Bessner

== Publication ==
The play was published by Samuel French Ltd. in 1948 as Murder on the Nile as "French's Acting Edition No 174".
