= Such Women Are Dangerous =

1934 film directed by James Flood

- Warner Baxter and Rosemary Ames
- Directed by: James Flood
- Screenplay by: Oscar M. Sheridan; Jane Storm; Lenore Coffee
- Based on: Odd Thursday by Vera Caspary
- Produced by: Al Rockett
- Starring: Warner Baxter; Rosemary Ames; Rochelle Hudson; Mona Barrie
- Cinematography: L. William O'Connell
- Edited by: Dorothy Spencer
- Music by: Louis De Francesco
- Production company: Fox Film Corporation
- Distributed by: Fox Film Corporation
- Release date: June 8, 1934
- Running time: 81 minutes
- Country: United States
- Language: English

Such Women Are Dangerous is a 1934 American pre-Code romantic drama film directed by James Flood and starring Warner Baxter, Rosemary Ames, Rochelle Hudson and Mona Barrie. Based on the unpuiblished short story Odd Thursday by Vera Caspary, it was produced and distributed by the Fox Film Corporation.

== Plot ==
Michael Shawn, a bestselling writer of novels aimed at the female market, is contemptuous of the women who read his works. His secretary Helen believes he should be working on more serious themes. When during a dictation they are interrupted by the opera singer Wanda Paris practising in a nearby property, Michael goes over to complain but the two strike up a spark and are soon lovers. His life is further complicated by the arrival of Vernie, an aspiring writer from Indiana who is infatuated with him. Rejected by him and suicidal, her body turns up some weeks later and Michael is now in the frame for her murder. Cleared of this, and having discovered that the man Wanda claimed was her manager is in fact her husband, Michael marries Helen and begins writing more serious books.

== Cast ==
- Warner Baxter as Michael Shawn
- Rosemary Ames as Helen Hallock
- Rochelle Hudson as Vernie Little
- Mona Barrie as Wanda Paris
- Herbert Mundin as Horatio Hollingsworth Wilson
- Henrietta Crosman as Aunt Sophie Travers
- Lily D. Stuart as Ellison
- Irving Pichel as Stanley
- Jane Barnes as Nancy Ryan
- Matt Moore as George Ryan
- Richard Carle as Thomas H. Delahanty
- Murray Kinnell as Jan Paris
- Frank Conroy as Bronson
- Fred Santley as Hinton
- John Sheehan as Granigan
- Addison Richards as Delange
- Bodil Rosing as Helma
- Douglas Scott as Josef Paris
- James Burke as Detective
- Edward LeSaint as Judge

== Bibliography ==
- Solomon, Aubrey. The Fox Film Corporation, 1915-1935: A History and Filmography. McFarland, 2011.
