= The Invisible Man (TV series) =

The Invisible Man may refer to the following TV series:

- The Invisible Man (1958 TV series), a 1958 UK series
- The Invisible Man (1975 TV series), a 1975 NBC series starring David McCallum
- The Invisible Man (1984 TV series), a 1984 UK serial produced by the BBC
- The Invisible Man (2000 TV series), a 2000 series on the Sci Fi Channel
- The Invisible Man (2005 TV series), a 2005 animated TV series from Moonscoop

== See also ==
- Gemini Man (TV series), a 1976 NBC series starring Ben Murphy, a restructuring of its 1975 David McCallum series
- The Vanishing Man
