= Mona Barrie =

English-American actress (1905–1964)

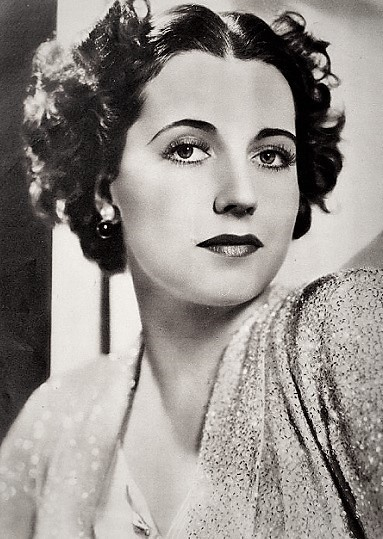
- Mona Barrie in 1936
- Born: Mona Barlee Smith; 18 December 1905; London, England
- Died: 27 June 1964 (aged 58); Los Angeles, California, U.S.
- Resting place: Knox United Church Cemetery, Agincourt, Toronto
- Occupation: Actress
- Years active: 1932–1953
- Known for: Charlie Chan in London
- Spouses: Charles Harold Rayson (m. 1928; div. 1931) Paul Macklin Bolton (m. 1938)

Mona Barrie (born Mona Barlee Smith; 18 December 1905 – 27 June 1964) was an English-born actress, active on stage in Australia before establishing a career in the US, and in Hollywood films.

== Career ==
Born Mona Barlee Smith in London to comedian Phil Smith and variety performer Jessie Barlee, she lived in Australia from 1914, and made her professional debut as Mona Barlee on stage in a 1922 J.C. Williamson production of The Merry Widow. For the next 10 years, she performed for J.C. Williamson's, mostly in musical comedies and earning a popular reputation, appearing with numerous Australian-based variety stars, including Roy Rene. She also appeared in His Royal Highness, her first film, with Australian comedian George Wallace. In 1933, she emigrated to New York City; she was given a test for films, which led to signing with Fox Film Corporation. She made her first U.S. film Sleepers East using the stage name Mona Barrie.

While her lack of a glamorous beauty resulted in her generally being cast in important but secondary roles, during a film career spanning almost 20 years, she appeared in more than 50 films. She co-starred in 1942's Dawn on the Great Divide, the last film Buck Jones made before he died in the Cocoanut Grove fire in Boston, Massachusetts. Barrie also performed at various playhouses across the U.S., debuting on Broadway in 1937 as Lady Agatha in Arthur Schwartz's Virginia.

For her contributions to the film industry, Barrie received a motion pictures star on the Hollywood Walk of Fame in 1960. Her star is located at 6140 Hollywood Boulevard.

== Personal life ==
She married Charles Harold Rayson in Melbourne, Australia in July 1928; however the marriage was not a success, and a divorce was granted in 1931. In 1938, she married Canadian Paul Macklin Bolton. Both unions were childless.

Barrie died in 1964 in Los Angeles, aged 58, from undisclosed causes. She and Bolton are interred together in the Knox United Church Cemetery in Agincourt, Toronto.

== Family ==
Barrie's sister, Rene Barlee, was a variety artist in Australia in the 1920s, and her brother, Roly Barlee, was chief announcer for Melbourne radio station 3UZ.

== Partial filmography ==
- His Royal Highness (1932)
- Carolina (1934) as Virginia Buchanan
- Sleepers East (1934) as Ada Robillard
- All Men Are Enemies (1934) as Margaret Scrope
- Such Women Are Dangerous (1934) as Wanda Paris
- One Night of Love (1934) as Rosa Lally
- Charlie Chan in London (1934) as Lady Mary Bristol
- I'll Fix It (1934) as Anne Barry
- Mystery Woman (1935) as Margaret Benoit
- Storm Over the Andes (1935) as Theresa
- The Unwelcome Stranger (1935) as Madeline Chamberlain
- Ladies Love Danger (1935) as Rita Witherspoon
- The Melody Lingers On (1935) as Sylvia Turina
- King of Burlesque (1936) as Rosalind Cleve
- Here Comes Trouble (1936) as Evelyn Howard
- A Message to Garcia (1936) as Spanish Spy
- Love on the Run (1936) as Baroness Hilda Spandermann
- Mountain Justice (1937) as Evelyn Wayne
- I Met Him in Paris (1937) as Helen Anders
- Something to Sing About (1937) as Stephanie 'Steffie' Hajos
- Love, Honor and Behave (1938) as Lisa Blake
- Men Are Such Fools (1938) as Beatrice Harris
- Say It in French (1938) as Lady Westover
- I Take This Woman (1940) as Sandra Mayberry
- Love, Honor, and Oh Baby! (1940) as Deedee Doree
- Who Killed Aunt Maggie? (1940) as Eve Benedict
- Lady with Red Hair (1940) as Mrs. Brooks
- Murder Among Friends (1941) as Clair Turk
- When Ladies Meet (1941) as Mabel Guinness
- Never Give a Sucker an Even Break (1941) as The Producer's Wife
- Ellery Queen and the Murder Ring (1941) as Nurse Marian Tracy
- Skylark (1941) as Charlette Gorell
- Road to Happiness (1941) as Millie Rankin
- Today I Hang (1942) as Martha Courtney
- A Tragedy at Midnight (1942) as Alta Wilton
- The Strange Case of Doctor Rx (1942) as Eileen Crispin
- Syncopation (1942) as Lillian
- Lady in a Jam (1942) as Woman (uncredited)
- Cairo (1942) as Mrs. Morrison
- Dawn on the Great Divide (1942) as Sadie Rand
- One Dangerous Night (1943) as Jane Merrick
- Storm Over Lisbon (1944) as Evelyn
- Just Before Dawn (1946) as Harriet Travers
- The Devil's Mask (1946) as Louise Mitchell
- The Secret of the Whistler (1946) as Linda Vail
- I Cover Big Town (1947) as Dora Hilton
- When a Girl's Beautiful (1947) as Cordova
- Cass Timberlane (1947) as Avis Elderman
- My Dog Rusty (1948) as Dr. Toni Cordell
- The First Time (1952) as Cassie Mayhew
- Strange Fascination (1952) as Diana Fowler
- Plunder of the Sun (1953) as Tourist (uncredited)
