= The Mousetrap and Other Plays =

Collection of plays by Agatha Christie

- US first edition hardcover
- Author: Agatha Christie
- Language: English
- Genre: Detective fiction Plays
- Publisher: G. P. Putnam's Sons
- Publication date: 25 November 1978
- Publication place: United Kingdom
- Media type: Print (hardback & paperback)
- Pages: 659 (first edition, hardback)
- ISBN: 0-396-07631-9

The Mousetrap and Other Plays is a collection of plays by English crime novelist Agatha Christie, published by G. P. Putnam's Sons on 25 November 1978. The eight plays had been previously published individually between 1944 and 1960, and all but Verdict are adaptations of previously published works by Christie.

== Contents ==
| Title | Original publication | Publisher (All London) | Source |
|---|---|---|---|
| And Then There Were None | 1944 | Samuel French Ltd. | Based on the 1939 novel Ten Little Niggers; also known as And Then There Were None and Ten Little Indians. |
| Appointment with Death | 1945 | Samuel French Ltd. | Based on the 1938 novel Appointment with Death |
| The Hollow | 1952 | Samuel French Ltd. | Based on the 1946 novel The Hollow |
| The Mousetrap | 1954 | Samuel French Ltd. | Expanded version of the radio play Three Blind Mice |
| Witness for the Prosecution | 1954 | Samuel French Ltd. | Based upon the 1925 short story "The Witness for the Prosecution" |
| Towards Zero | 1957 | Samuel French Ltd. | With Gerald Verner; based on the novel Towards Zero |
| Verdict | 1958 | Samuel French Ltd. | Original play |
| Go Back for Murder | 1960 | Samuel French Ltd. | Based on the novel Five Little Pigs |
