= Changes (1991 film) =

- DVD cover
- Genre: Drama; Romance
- Based on: Changes by Danielle Steel
- Written by: Susan Nanus
- Directed by: Charles Jarrott
- Starring: Cheryl Ladd; Michael Nouri
- Music by: Lee Holdridge
- Country of origin: United States
- Original language: English

Production
- Executive producer: Douglas S. Cramer
- Producer: Hugh Benson
- Production locations: Santa Clarita, California; Santa Monica, California
- Cinematography: Chuck Arnold
- Editor: Michael S. McLean
- Running time: 96 minutes
- Production companies: The Cramer Company; NBC Productions

Original release
- Network: NBC
- Release: April 1, 1991

Changes, also known as Danielle Steel's Changes, is a 1991 American made-for-television romantic drama film directed by Charles Jarrott. The film is based upon the 1983 novel of the same name written by Danielle Steel. The film was produced by The Cramer Company and NBC Productions and aired on NBC on April 1, 1991.

== Plot ==
Melanie Adams is a divorced mother who gave birth to twin girls Val and Jessica at age 19 before becoming a successful news correspondent working in New York City. For her latest story, she travels to Los Angeles to do a report on a sick, but an optimistic girl. She immediately feels attracted to the girl's doctor, Peter Hallam. Peter is a widowed father of three children; 18-year-old Mark, 15-year-old Pam, and 8-year-old Matt. Their mother died of pulmonary hypertension after refusing treatment. The family is still grieving - especially Pam - has difficulty dealing with the loss.

After a short-lived romance, Melanie and Peter part ways. They soon conclude that they can't live without each other and Melanie reluctantly gives up her job, thereby ruining her chances of becoming an anchor, to move with Val and Jessica, now 16, to Los Angeles. There, she takes a job as a co-host at a local news program and soon finds out the other co-host, Paul Stevenson, is not glad about her arrival, trying to sabotage her opportunities. Further on, she and Peter are married.

Trying to adjust to Californian life does not go without trouble. Val and Mark fall in love and she becomes pregnant. Fearing their parents' judgment, they decide to visit a downtown inexperienced doctor for an abortion. Val soon becomes very sick, which forces Mark to tell Melanie and Peter the truth about her abortion. While dealing with this information, Melanie is bothered by the great impact Peter's first wife still has. Pam and the maid, Mrs. Hahn treat Melanie horribly by not allowing Melanie to take in her own furniture and the twins still have to use a spare room.

When Melanie finds out she is pregnant, Peter is delighted, but the children are disgusted. Realizing she already does not have enough time to spend time with Val and Jessica, she considers having an abortion. When Peter thinks she only wants an abortion because of her career, Melanie decides that she has had enough. She packs her stuff and runs away to San Francisco. The family soon realizes all the problems they have caused Melanie. Peter fires Mrs. Hahn for not accepting Melanie as his new wife, and he takes down his late wife's portrait from the wall. Afterward, Peter convinces Melanie to return and everyone - including Pam - apologizes.

The family decides to move to a new house with more space, and Peter hires Raquel, her maid from New York. Melanie soon gives birth to twins: a girl named Karen and a boy named Richard.

== Cast ==
- Cheryl Ladd as Melanie Adams
- Michael Nouri as Peter Hallam
- Christopher Gartin as Mark Hallam
- Christie Clark as Valerie "Val" Adams
- Renee O'Connor as Jessica Adams
- Ami Foster as Pam Hallam
- Joseph Gordon-Levitt as Matthew "Matt" Hallam
- Liz Sheridan as Mrs. Hahn
- Betty Carvalho as Raquel
- Randee Heller as Carol Kellerman
- Cynthia Bain as Marie Dupres
- Charles Frank as Brad Buckley
- James Sloyan as Paul Stevenson
- Luis Avalos as Ray
- Flo Di Re as Helen
