= Beyond the Rising Moon =

- Directed by: Philip J. Cook
- Written by: Philip J. Cook
- Produced by: John R. Ellis
- Starring: Hans Bachmann
- Cinematography: Philip J. Cook
- Edited by: Philip J. Cook
- Music by: David Bartley
- Production company: Common Man Motion Pictures Corp.
- Distributed by: VidAmerica
- Release date: February 28, 1990
- Running time: 97 minutes
- Country: United States
- Language: English
- Budget: $175,000

Beyond the Rising Moon (also known as Star Quest and Starquest - Beyond the Rising Moon) is a 1988 direct-to-video science fiction film by Philip J. Cook.

== Cast ==
- Tracy Davis as Pentan
- Hans Bachmann as Harold Brickman
- Michael Mack as John Moesby
- Ron Ikejiri as Takashi Kuriyama

== Production ==
Philip J. Cook and John R. Ellis (formerly an inker and illustrator for Marvel Comics) had both worked at Broadcast Arts as a director of photography and animator respectively during Broadcast Arts' initial years in Washington, D.C., and had stayed in the area after the company relocated to New York City. Ellis was introduced to Cook during a company screening of one of Cook's 8 mm film projects that showed impressive effects work in spite of the limitations and lead to the two collaborating on a film. The majority ofBeyond the Rising Moon was filmed in a warehouse outside Alexandria, Virginia with sets torn down to make way for new ones as filming proceeded in an area of approximately 2,000 square feet.

== Release ==
The film was released on home video under the title Star Quest: Beyond the Rising Moon on February 28, 1990, by VidAmerica on VHS and LaserDisc. Three versions of the movie exist with the home video release running 84 minutes, a 90-minute version broadcast sporadically on the Sci-Fi Channel from March 1994 to November 1996, and a 97-minute director's cut that has not seen release.
