= Appointment with Death (play) =

1945 play by crime writer Agatha Christie

- Written by: Agatha Christie
- Original language: English

Premiere
- Date premiered: 29 January 1945
- Place premiered: United Kingdom

Appointment with Death is a 1945 play by crime writer Agatha Christie. It is based on her 1938 novel of the same name.

== Background ==
Christie is silent on the writing of both the book and the play in her autobiography. Her biography states that she started writing the play in a burst of enthusiasm after being involved in the preparations for Murder on the Nile which was being presented by her actor friend Francis L. Sullivan. The writing was completed by March 1944 and preparations were made towards the end of the year for an opening in Glasgow before transferring to the West End theatre. Christie wrote to her agent, Edmund Cork, the month before that "it really seems quite impossible that the play can be ready for Glasgow!" Nevertheless, the play did open there at the King's Theatre on 29 January 1945 and then opened in the West End on 31 March 1945 at the Piccadilly Theatre. The play was not well received by the critics although box office receipts at the start were better than those for And Then There Were None eighteen months earlier. The play was directed by Terence de Marney who had played Philip Lombard in And Then There Were None. The play closed on 5 May after just 42 performances.

The original West End production is most notable for the appearance of Joan Hickson in the role of Miss Pryce. Christie was so taken with her performance that she wrote to Hickson and stated that she hoped she would one day play the character of Miss Marple. Hickson was later cast in this role in 1984 in the BBC television series.

The adaptation of the book is notable for being one of the most radical reworkings of a novel Christie ever did, not only eliminating Hercule Poirot from the story, but changing the identity of the killer. In the play, the ill Mrs Boynton commits suicide and drops several red herrings that pointed to her family members as possible suspects, hoping that they would suspect each other and therefore continue to live in her shadow even after her death, whereas in the novel Lady Westholme is the murderer. In the play, Lady Westholme becomes a purely comic character.

== Synopsis of Scenes ==
The time – the present.

ACT I

- The lounge of the King Solomon Hotel, Jerusalem. Afternoon

ACT II

- Scene 1 – The Travellers' Camp at Petra. Early Afternoon. A week later.
- Scene 2 – The same day. Three hours later

ACT III

- Scene 1 – The same. The following morning
- Scene 2 – The same. The same afternoon

== Reception ==
The Observer was not overly impressed in its review of 8 April 1945 when it said, "Mrs. Agatha Christie sans library or lounge-hall. Unhappily, her people, with one exception, are less surprising than their surroundings. As a thriller – how did Mrs. Boynton die? – the play is tepid and far too talkative. But it does give Miss Mary Clare a strong scene or two as the woman of the gimlet gaze, and Miss Carla Lehmann and Mr. Owen Reynolds both help pleasantly."

The Guardian's issue of 2 April 1945 contained a review by "LH" in which he praised the character of Mrs Boynton but said that, "her death leaves the last act colourless. The business of spotting which of the many interested hands held the fatal hypodermic syringe is commonplace. It is not the flies caught in the web, but the spider in the middle, that is the evening's strength. Apart from thus pulling down the roof-tree in the second interval, Miss Christie has built up her house of mystery with her usual skill."

The Daily Mirror's short review of 3 April 1945, by Bernard Buckham said, "Has a strong dash of comedy, which it can do with!"

=== Credits of London production ===
Director: Terence de Marney

Cast of Piccadilly Theatre Production:

- Mary Clare as Mrs Boynton
- Deryn Kerby as Ginerva Boynton, her stepdaughter
- Ian Lubbock as Lennox Boynton, her elder stepson
- Beryl Machin as Nadine Boynton, Lennox's wife
- John Glennon as a Liftboy
- Percy Walsh as Alderman Higgs
- Anthony Dorset as a Clerk and a Bedouin
- Janet Burnell as Lady Westholme
- Joan Hickson as Miss Pryce
- Gerard Hinze as Dr Gerard
- Carla Lehmann as Sarah King
- Alan Sedgewick as Jefferson Cope
- John Wynn as Raymond Boynton, Lennox's younger brother
- Harold Berens as a Dragoman
- Owen Raynolds as Colonel Carbery
- Cherry Herbert as a Lady visitor
- Corinne Whitehouse and Joseph Blanchard as Hotel visitors

== Publication ==
The play was first published as a paperback by Samuel French Ltd on 29 June 1956, priced at four shillings. It was first published in hardback in The Mousetrap and Other Plays by G. P. Putnam's Sons in 1978 (ISBN 0-396-07631-9) and in the UK by HarperCollins in 1993 (ISBN 0-00-224344-X).
