= Barbara Toy =

Australian writer (1908–2001)

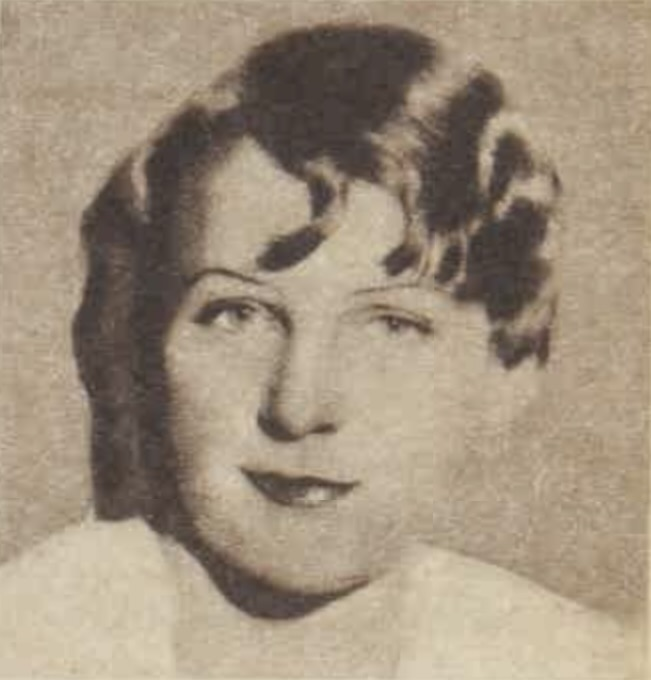
Barbara Toy in 1948

Barbara Alex Toy FRGS (11 August 1908 – 18 July 2001) was an Australian-British travel writer, theatrical director, playwright, and screenplay writer. She is most famous for the series of books she wrote about her pioneering and solitary travels around the world in a Land Rover, undertaken in the 1950s and 1960s. Toy was drawn to deserts, and so the majority of her journeys were in the arid lands of Northern Africa and the Middle East.

Toy's first solo journey took place almost five years before the perhaps more celebrated six-man team Oxford and Cambridge Far Eastern Expedition, a London to Singapore overland trip between September 1955 and March 1956 that was also undertaken in Land Rovers.

== Life before Land Rovers ==
Toy was born in Sydney, on 11 August 1908 to Bert Frank Claud Toy and Nellie Frederica (Lowing) Toy, one of two daughters born to the couple. Her father, Bert Toy (1878–1931), was a newspaper editor and war correspondent. He had reported from the Boer War in South Africa and had worked on and edited newspapers in New Zealand and in Australia, including the Wairarapa Age, the Sydney Morning Herald, The Sunday Times, The Sun, The Bulletin (where he was literary editor) and the Australian Woman's Mirror. The family were well-read and eschewed formal education; consequently Toy was largely self-taught, although she did attend Neutral Bay School in Sydney for a time. Her father encouraged Toy's interest in writing from an early age. In 1930 Toy married Ewing Rixson, a member of a well-known New York Quaker family. At the time of her marriage, Toy was a librarian at the Roycroft Library, a bookshop and library established by Frances Zabel in Rowe Street, Sydney, in the 1920s. Rixson had a passion for books and travel, (at the time of their marriage he was already a Fellow of the Royal Geographical Society), and introduced Toy to the world of travel. However, the couple gradually drifted apart, and separated from her husband, Toy moved to London in 1935.

In London Toy became involved in the theatrical world. After an unsuccessful stint as an actress, from 1939 she worked behind the scenes at the Richmond Theatre in the London Borough of Richmond upon Thames as assistant stage manager and then stage director. She worked as a volunteer ambulance driver and/or an air raid warden during The Blitz. After bomb damage closed the Richmond Theatre in 1941, Toy worked at the Welwyn Film Studios, where she met screenwriter and film director Norman Lee. In 1943 under the pseudonym 'Norman Armstrong', she co-authored Lifeline with Lee, described as 'a play about the merchant navy in three acts' and her first published work, published by Samuel French. Toy also co-authored a film screenplay with Lee, an adaptation of W. W. Jacobs' 1902 horror story The Monkey's Paw, the film of which was released in 1948.

In 1945, Toy travelled to Germany and the Netherlands for ENSA, the Entertainments National Service Association, to compile a report on the state of theatre in liberated Western Europe. After she returned to England, Toy became the director of a new theatre production company with her friend Moie Charles. Together, they also wrote dramatisations of three novels. In 1949 Toy and Charles approached Agatha Christie about adapting her 1930 novel Murder at the Vicarage into a play of the same name. Christie's official biography suggests that the play was written by Christie with changes then made by Charles and Toy, presumably enough for them to claim the credit. The play included a major change to the denouement. Whatever the truth of the authorship, Christie was enthusiastic about the play and attended its rehearsals and first night at The Playhouse in December 1949. The production ran for 126 performances. Toy and Charles also wrote The Man in Grey, a play adaptation of the novel of the same name by Lady Eleanor Smith, and Random Harvest, based on the book of the same name by James Hilton. Toy took over the management of Worthing Repertory Company at the Connaught Theatre in Worthing, a position she held until she resigned to go off on her first overland journey in late 1950.

== Travels in Land Rovers ==
Toy had travelled extensively with her husband. In her earlier years she had visited Thailand, Iceland, Europe including Yugoslavia and Greece, and Lebanon, and she had been made a Fellow of the Royal Geographical Society in recognition of these travels. However, her life changed to one of solo overland expeditions and adventure in 1950, as a result of a bet made in a pub. Toy has been recognised as a pioneer of long distance overland expeditions: not only was she one of the first people to undertake such expeditions (only a Colonel Leblanc had made such a journey before her, in 1949), she was the first woman to do so. Many of the expeditions that followed were team efforts, whereas Toy travelled alone and without support or backup.

=== First expedition 1950-1: Gibraltar to Baghdad and back to London ===
Toy had always wanted to visit Baghdad. She described the genesis of the first of many solo overland trips in a 1963 newspaper interview: "Her philosophy is that life is gloriously free and, if you really want to do anything, nothing and no one can stop you. 'I was arguing about this with a group of friends in a London pub ... and I suddenly found myself saying, 'As a matter of fact, I'm off to Bagdad [sic] in a week or two'." Once committed to the trip, she quickly got together the money to buy a demonstration (i.e. second hand) 1950 80" rag-top Series I Land Rover, which she named Pollyanna, and organised the visas, permits and carnets required. As she already knew Europe from her earlier travels she decided to take a route via North Africa. She set off alone on her journey, starting from Gibraltar (she flew out there from London and had Pollyanna freighted to await her there), some time after Christmas 1950. She crossed the Straits of Gibraltar and followed the Mediterranean coastline of North Africa, travelling through what was then French Morocco, Algeria, Tunisia, Libya and Egypt, to Cyprus, then down through Lebanon, Syria and then through Jordan to Iraq. While in Iraq she visited several archaeological sites, including in May 1951 Sir Max Mallowan's excavations at Nimrud where his wife Agatha Christie was helping with processing the finds. The work on the site had just finished, and the finds for that season included the stele of King Assur-nasir-pal II. Her journey home is not described in the book, although in her second book A Fool in the Desert she says that she drove back to England. Toy published an account of her travels in 1955 under the title A Fool on Wheels: Tangier to Baghdad by Land-Rover. The 'Fool on Wheels' title was taken from a dismissive remark by a brigadier she met in Gibraltar at the start of her travels who had told her that she was mad to even think about making the journey. The book was well-received: The Spectator commented "A highly readable book about her solitary journey in a Land Rover from Tangier to Baghdad. A woman of remarkable courage", while The Times said of her "She has a gift for people: she has an eye for places." It is worth noting that Toy's solo journey took place almost five years before the perhaps more celebrated six-man team Oxford and Cambridge Far Eastern Expedition, a London to Singapore overland trip between September 1955 and March 1956 that was also undertaken in Land Rovers.

=== Second expedition 1952: Libya ===
Toy's second journey was through Libya. This six or seven-month expedition was undertaken in 1952. She and Pollyanna arrived by ship at Tripoli. As well as travelling along the coastline, she made two journeys into the interior, to Traghen in Fezzan, and to Al Jawf (called El Giof by Toy) and El Tag in the Kufra oasis. Toy's guide to Kufra was the same man who had guided Rosita Forbes there in 1920-1. In Tripoli, Toy met Major Gordon Lett, who had ordered many vehicles to be pushed over cliffs into the sea rather than let them fall into German hands at the second fall of Tobruk. Toy spent some time in the desert looking for bodies with Herman Schultze-Dewitz, former ADC to Field Marshal Rommel and now in charge of the German War Graves Commission unit in Cyrenaica. Toy dived in Benghazi, and three weeks after her dive the sunken ammunition ship near which she had been diving exploded. She arrived back in the UK in October 1952. Prior to setting out on this journey, Toy had Pollyanna fitted with a new station wagon body to replace her soft top; the flat roof was painted white to reflect the sun's rays.

=== Third expedition 1953: Kuwait and Saudi Arabia ===
Another journey followed in 1953, beginning in Kuwait when she wrote to King Abdulaziz, the King of Saudi Arabia asking for permission to visit. Permission was granted, and Toy became one of the first women to explore Saudi Arabia and to meet the King and visit his harem.

"Since then [her post-1990 trip to the Alps] I've taken her [Pollyanna, her 1950 Series I Land Rover] on a few runs. I did Land's End to John O'Groats just to keep her going but it was terribly dull ... I am planning another trip next year. I want to get back to the Yemen but I'm having trouble getting insurance. When I ring up and say I'm 90 and my car's nearly 50, they seem to lose interest."

— Barbara Toy, speaking in 1998.

=== Fourth expedition 1956-7: Round the world ===
Her 'boldest feat' was her fourth journey, a round-the-world trip in Pollyanna, through Europe and Turkey to Pakistan, through Asia, from Perth to Sydney and finally from San Francisco to New York, a journey that she described in her 1958 book, Columbus was Right!: Rover around the world. She had reached Singapore by March 1957 and was in Australia by May that year.

=== Fifth expedition 1959: Libya, Central African Republic, Congo, Tanganyika, Sudan, Ethiopia and Kenya ===
Toy felt that her fifth journey, in 1959, was when she became a real 'explorer'. She travelled from Libya to the Central African Republic, further south to the Congo and then east to Lake Victoria, then north along the River Nile to Khartoum in Sudan, then east into Ethiopia, then took a wandering course south through Ethiopia and eventually entered Kenya at Moyale. She claimed to have been the first Westerner to set foot on the top of Mount Wahni in Ethiopia, known locally as Wehni Amba, which she accessed by helicopter. She wrote about her travels in her 1961 book In Search of Sheba: Across the Sahara to Ethiopia.

=== Sixth expedition 1961: Timbuktu to Tripoli ===
In another journey, undertaken in 1961 in a replacement and more modern Land Rover, her third, a 109" Series IIA Dormobile Land Rover, registration 5751 WD, Toy drove from Timbuktu to Tripoli, described in her 1964 book, The Way of the Chariots. One aim was to investigate the hundreds of rock drawings discovered in 1933 by a French officer in the Tassili n'Ajjer mountains in southern Algeria. She also hoped to see if there was any evidence for the apocryphal great highway stretching from the Mediterranean to the Niger that had been supposedly driven by chariots in prehistoric times.

=== Expeditions in later life ===
In 1990, at the age of 81 and as Vice-President of the Land Rover Register 1948–1953, Toy set off on her second world tour in the original Pollyanna. She successfully completed a second circumnavigation and was home just in time for Christmas. After that, she made a trip across the Alps, retracing the steps of the journey made by Hannibal and his elephants.

Toy was a Fellow of the Royal Geographical Society, and received the Rover Award for one of her journeys.

== Pollyanna ==
Pollyanna was Toy's first Land Rover, in which she undertook the journeys described in her first four books. It was a 1950 80" soft-top Series I Land Rover, a demonstration model (i.e. second hand) bought in late 1951 from Henly's in Osnaburgh Street in London for £640, with the registration KYH 628. Thanks to the publicity generated by her books about her travels, Toy entered into a sponsorship deal with Rover, the makers of Land Rovers. Before her second journey, to Libya some time between 1953 and 1955, Toy had Pollyanna fitted with a new station wagon body to replace her soft top, and the flat roof was painted white to reflect the sun's rays In around 1960 (dates vary: some sources say 1958), after nearly a decade of service and 210,000 miles of travel, Rover pressured Toy into exchanging Pollyanna for a newer long wheel base Series II model, as the company felt she could not be seen representing the marque in an old-fashioned and battered 1950 Land Rover. Rover then gave Pollyanna to a technical mechanics' college in Chesterfield. It was later recognised as the iconic Pollyanna and bought and restored by a Mr Shakespeare, a Land Rover enthusiast. He showed it at shows and rallies, and approached Toy for memorabilia from her travels to display at such events. She asked to buy Pollyanna back, but he refused. In 1989, after he had died, Toy was able to buy Pollyanna from his estate for £3,500, paying five times what she had originally paid for it. A passage in Toy's book In Search of Sheba: Across the Sahara to Ethiopia (1961) describes her feelings on being forced to trade in her beloved Pollyanna for a newer, unwanted model—and one which she considered to be less reliable.

By 2009, Pollyanna was in the ownership of Tom Pickford and his father Guy, who during Toy's lifetime had looked after it for her at their workshop. It can occasionally be seen at specialist car shows and rallies.

== Personal life ==
In a newspaper article of 13 February 1963, Toy was described as a widow. Her obituary in The Times stated that she was married briefly to Ewing Rixson and that they had no children. In 1998 Toy was living in Chipping Norton in Oxfordshire; she died in Banbury on 18 July 2001, just three and a half weeks before her 93rd birthday.

== Works ==
=== Plays and screenplays ===
- 1943 Lifeline. Play, co-authored with Norman Lee with Toy writing under the pseudonym 'Norman Armstrong'.
- 1948 The Monkey's Paw. Film screenplay, co-authored with Norman Lee.
- 1949 Murder at the Vicarage. Play, co-authored with Moie Charles.
- 1950 Random Harvest. Play, co-authored with Moie Charles.
- 1953 Man in Grey. Play, co-authored with Moie Charles.

=== Books ===
All but the last were published by John Murray in London.

- 1955 A Fool on Wheels: Tangier to Baghdad by Land-Rover (First journey, undertaken in 1950-1)
- 1956 A Fool in the Desert: Journey in Libya (Second journey, undertaken in 1952)
- 1957 A Fool Strikes Oil: Across Saudi Arabia (Third journey, undertaken in 1953)
- 1958 Columbus was Right!: Rover around the world (Fourth journey, undertaken in 1956-7)
- 1961 In Search of Sheba: Across the Sahara to Ethiopia (Fifth journey, undertaken in 1959)
- 1964 The Way of the Chariots: Niger River – Sahara – Libya (Sixth journey, undertaken in 1961)
- 1968 The Highway of the Three Kings: Arabia from south to north
- 1970 Rendezvous in Cyprus
- 2009 (posthumously) Travelling the Incense Route: From Arabia to the Levant in the Footsteps of the Magi

=== Articles ===
- 1961 "Wahni, The Princes’ Prison Mountain" in The Cornhill Magazine, Spring 1961, no. 1027, 16–31. London: John Murray.

== See also ==
- List of travellers
