= Bertie Alexander Meyer =

British theatre producer (1877–1967)

Meyer, c.1932

Bertie Alexander Meyer (17 June 1877 – mid November 1967) was a British theatre producer and entrepreneur.

== Biography ==
Meyer was born on 17 June 1877 to a Jewish family. In 1902, he worked under director Arthur Lewis at the Garrick Theatre who was putting on a series of plays with actress Gabrielle Réjane. He worked with Réjane the following year at Terry's. He was appointed manager of the German Theatre in London, becoming business manager for Charles Frohman and manager of the Queen's Theatre after his death. Meyer then went on two tours of Australia with Oscar Asche and Lily Brayton. He returned to London in 1913, and in October of that year, he was appointed business manager of the Globe Theatre. He served in the Royal Army Ordnance Corps from 1914 during World War I, reaching the position of lieutenant and acting as an interpreter.

Meyer oversaw the construction of the St Martin's Theatre in the West End. Following his discharge from military service in 1922, he was appointed general manager of the Ambassadors Theatre, and in 1923 worked with Owen Nares to produce The Enchanted Cottage and If Winter Comes on stage. He was the producer of the Grand Guignol Season in 1927–28 at the Little Theatre.

The Cambridge Theatre in the West End, which opened on 4 September 1930, was built for Meyer by the architects Wimperis, Simpson and Guthrie. In January 1932, he married the second time; the wedding to the American film actress Rosemary Ames, occurred at St Martin's register office in London. Two years later, Ames filed for divorce in Chicago on the grounds of desertion. (Note: Meyer was married four times. His first wife was Dorothy Grimston; that marriage ended in divorce; his third wife was Diana Hamilton, after whose death he married Beryl Menzies.) During the period 1936 to 1939, he lived abroad.

From Christmas 1954, he produced a stage adaption of Enid Blyton's Noddy, Noddy in Toyland, with stage director André van Gyseghem at the large Stoll Theatre in Kingsway, London. Meyer was 77 at the time. Due to the success of the pantomime, which sold out, Meyer and Blyton agreed to continue with it, and it ended up being shown for a further five or six years. In 1958, Meyer announced that in association with Geraldo, he would produce a musical version of Gerald du Maurier's Trilby.

Meyyer had been involved with the adaptation of Agatha Christie's books into plays as early as 1928 with Alibi. However, when Meyer was approached by Christie in 1950 to produce a stage adaption of her novel The Hollow, he turned it down as he believed it would be too difficult to cast, although it has been speculated that the anti-Semitism in the novel was the primary reason. Meyer also turned down her Towards Zero, causing annoyance to Christie for his sudden aversion to her. Meyer took over the St Martin's Theatre again in 1960, which he ran intermittently until his death in November 1967, when his son R.A. (Ricky) took over. Meyer was cremated at Golders Green Crematorium on 22 November 1967.

== Notes and references ==
Notes

== Sources ==
- Gaye, Freda, ed. (1967). Who's Who in the Theatre (fourteenth ed.). London: Sir Isaac Pitman and Sons. OCLC 5997224.
