= And Then There Were None (play) =

1943 play by Agatha Christie

- Samuel French 2011 edition
- Written by: Agatha Christie
- Genre: Mystery

Premiere
- Date: 20 September 1943
- Place: New Wimbledon Theatre, Wimbledon, London

And Then There Were None is a 1943 play by crime writer Agatha Christie. The play, like the 1939 book on which it is based, was originally titled and performed in the UK as Ten Little Niggers. It was also performed under the name Ten Little Indians.

== Background ==
Christie had been pleased with the book, stating in her autobiography "I wrote the book after a tremendous amount of planning, and I was pleased with what I made of it." The book was very well received upon publication and Christie received a request from Reginald Simpson to be allowed to dramatise it. Christie refused, because she relished the challenge herself, although it would take her two years to carry out the task. She knew the ending would have to be changed because all of the characters die in the book and therefore "I must make two of the characters innocent, to be reunited at the end and come safe out of the ordeal." The original nursery rhyme that inspired the title had an alternative ending:

"He got married and then there were none"

This allowed Christie to portray a different conclusion on stage.

After the play had been written, most people she discussed it with considered it impossible to produce. She received some encouragement from Charles Cochrane but he was unable to find financial backers. Finally, Bertie Mayer, who had produced the 1928 play Alibi, agreed to stage it.

After a try-out at the Wimbledon Theatre starting on 20 September 1943, the play opened in the West End at the St James's Theatre on 17 November. It gained good reviews and ran for 260 performances until 24 February 1944 when the theatre was bombed. It then transferred to the Cambridge Theatre opening on 29 February and running at that venue until 6 May. It then transferred back to the restored St James' on 9 May and finally closed on 1 July.

Although she did not feel it to be her best play, Christie did declare it was her best piece of "craftsmanship". She also considered it to be the play which formally started her career as a playwright, despite the success of Black Coffee in 1930.

== Plot ==
The stage adaptation's plot largely follows that of the novel. The story begins when eight disparate guests arrive at an isolated mansion located on an island off the coast of Devon, and are tended to by two married domestics who prepared the house for their arrival. During the first evening a gramophone recording accuses all ten people of past crimes that went unpunished by the law. Soon they start dying one at a time, and the remaining guests deduce that the murderer is one of their own.

== Scenes ==
The scene of the play is the living-room of the house on Indian Island (Nigger Island in the 1943 UK production), off the coast of Devon. The time – the present.

ACT I

- An evening in August

ACT II

- Scene 1 – The following morning
- Scene 2 – The same day. Afternoon

ACT III

- Scene 1 – The same day. Evening
- Scene 2 – The following morning

== Reception of London production ==
Ivor Brown reviewed the play in The Observer's issue of 21 November 1943 when he said, "Miss Agatha Christie does not stint things. Like Hotspur, who could kill six dozen Scots at breakfast, complain of his quiet life, and then ask for work, she is not one to be concerned about a mere singleton corpse. But she can add quality to quantity in her domestic morgue. In Ten Little Niggers she shows an intense ingenuity in adapting that very lethal rhyme (so oddly deemed a nursery matter) to modern conditions." Mr. Brown concluded that Henrietta Watson's portrayal of Emily Brent was, "the most authentic member of a house party with 'no future in it. played the airmen say. That gently lugubrious phrase certainly does not hold of the play."

=== Credits of London production ===
Director: Irene Hentschel
Decor by: Clifford Pember

==== Cast ====
William Murray – Rogers
Reginald Barlow – Narracott
Hilda Bruce-Potter – Mrs Rogers
Linden Travers – Vera Claythorne
Terence De Marney – Philip Lombard
Michael Blake – Anthony Marston
Percy Walsh – William Blore
Eric Cowley – General MacKenzie
Henrietta Watson – Emily Brent
Allan Jeayes – Sir Lawrence Wargrave
Gwyn Nicholls – Dr Armstrong

== Broadway production ==
A production in New York opened at the Broadhurst Theatre under the title Ten Little Indians on 27 June 1944. On 6 January 1945, it transferred to the Plymouth Theatre where it ran from 9 January until 30 June 1945. The total run on Broadway was 426 performances.

=== Credits of Broadway production ===
Director: Albert de Courville

==== Cast ====
Neil Fitzgerald – Rogers
Georgia Harvey – Mrs. Rogers
Halliwell Hobbes – Sir Lawrence Wargrave
Nicholas Joy – General MacKenzie
Anthony Kemble Cooper – Anthony Marston
Claudia Morgan – Vera Claythorne
Patrick O'Connor – Fred Narracott
J. Pat O'Malley – William Blore
Michael Whalen – Philip Lombard
Estelle Winwood – Emily Brent
Harry Worth – Dr. Armstrong

== Publication and further adaptations ==
The play was first published by Samuel French Ltd as a paperback in 1944. It was first published in hardback in The Mousetrap and Other Plays by G. P. Putnam's Sons in 1978 (ISBN 0-396-07631-9) and in the UK by HarperCollins in 1993 (ISBN 0-00-224344-X).

At some point after the end of the Second World War, a survivor of Buchenwald concentration camp contacted Christie and told her that the inmates had staged their own production there, undoubtedly writing their own script as they would not have had access to the author's version. Christie was told that they found that it had "sustained them".

=== 2005 production ===
On 14 October 2005 a new version of the play, written by Kevin Elyot and directed by Steven Pimlott opened at the Gielgud Theatre in London. For this script, Elyot restored the original book ending where both Vera and Lombard die and the murderer commits suicide. The versions of the rhyme and island name used were "Ten Little Soldiers" and "Soldier Island" as per current printings of the novel. Despite some positive reviews, the play closed on 14 January 2006.

== Controversy ==
In November 2007, Lakota East High School in West Chester, OH, was set to perform the play but plans were cancelled after the NAACP protested about the production because of the original title of the novel. Lakota East High School officials subsequently revised their plans and decided to perform the play on 29 November under the title "And Then There Were None".
