= List of theaters in Illinois =

Theatres in Illinois outside the Chicago area include:

- Alton Little Theater
- Bengt Sjostrom Theatre
- Cutting Hall
- Hoogland Center for the Arts
- Krannert Center for the Performing Arts
- The Little Theatre on the Square
- Muddy River Opera Company
- Orpheum Theater (Galesburg)
- Peoria Civic Center
- Rock Valley College Starlight Theatre
- Rock Valley College Studio Theatre
- Sesser Opera House
- Station Theatre (Urbana)
- Theatre & Interpretation Center
- Woodstock Opera House

== See also ==
In the Chicago area:
