= Rock Valley =

Rock Valley may refer to:

- Rock Valley College in Rockford, Illinois
  - Rock Valley College Starlight Theatre, a theatre run by the institution
  - Rock Valley College Studio Theatre, another theatre run by the institution
- Rock Valley, Iowa, United States
- Rock Valley, Holyoke, Massachusetts, a neighborhood in Holyoke, Massachusetts
- Rock Valley, New South Wales, a locality in the Northern Rivers
- Rock Valley School, in the town of Hancock, New York is on the National Register of Historic Places
