= Citi Field =

Baseball stadium in Queens, New York

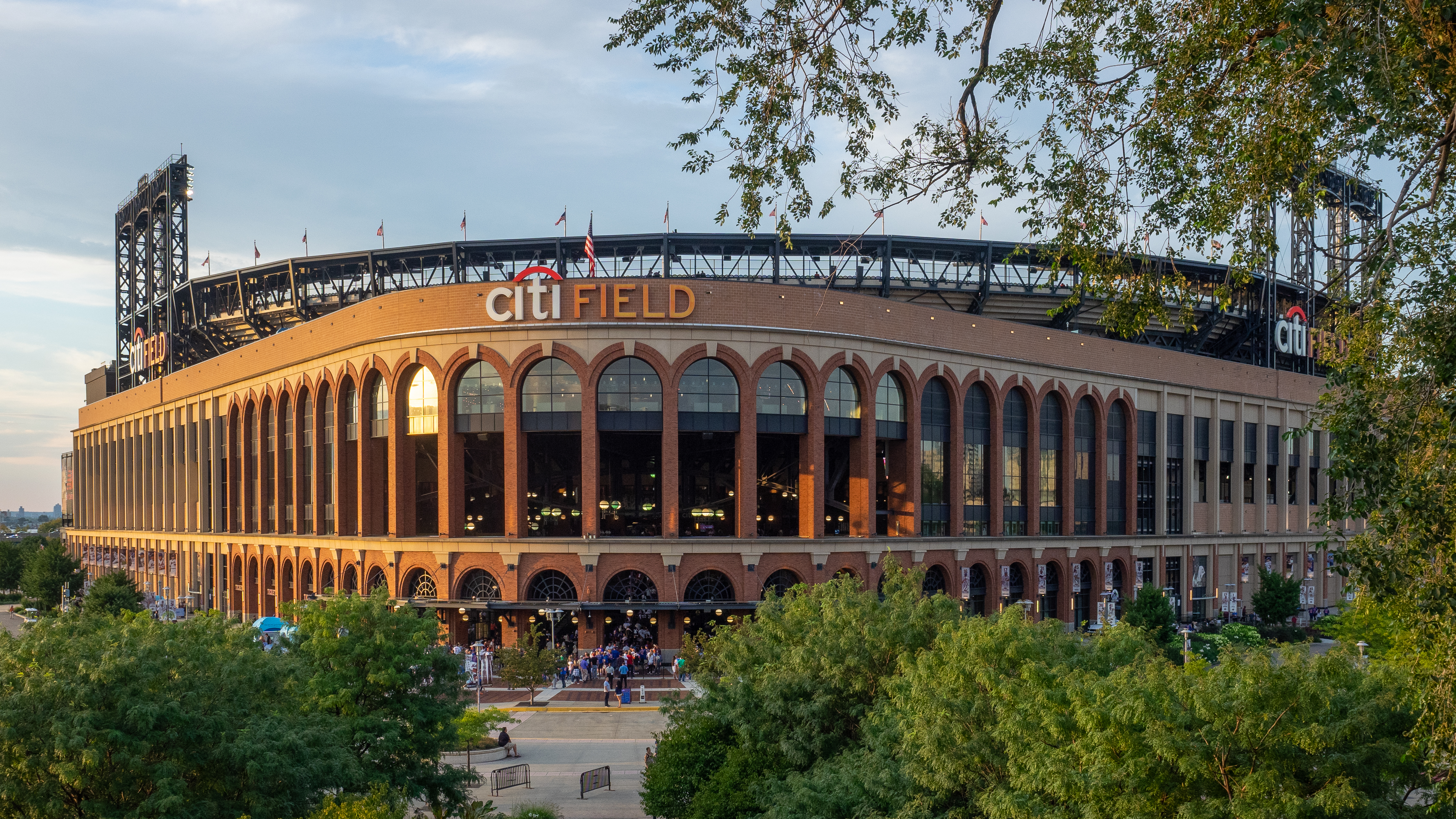
- Citi Field in 2019

- Location in New York City Location in New York State Location in the United States
- Interactive map of Citi Field
- Address: 41 Seaver Way
- Location: Flushing Meadows–Corona Park, Queens, New York City, U.S.
- Coordinates: 40°45′25″N 73°50′45″W
- Owner: New York Mets (stadium); City of New York (land)
- Operator: New York Mets
- Capacity: 41,922 (2012–present); 41,800 (2009–2011); 45,000+ (including standing room)
- Surface: Kentucky Bluegrass
- Record attendance: 45,186 (2013 All-Star Game); 44,859 (2015 World Series); 44,466 (Regular season, 2016); 43,700 (August 3, 2023; Pink's Summer Carnival)
- Field size: Left field line - 335 feet (102 m); Left center - 358 feet (109 m); Deep left center - 385 feet (117 m); Center field - 408 feet (124 m); Deep right center - 398 feet (121 m); Right center - 375 feet (114 m); Right field line - 330 feet (101 m)
- Public transit: Long Island Rail Road: Port Washington Branch at Mets–Willets Point; New York City Subway: at Mets–Willets Point; New York City Bus: Q19, Q66, Q90

Construction
- Groundbreaking: November 13, 2006
- Opened: March 29, 2009 (college game); April 3, 2009 (exhibition game); April 13, 2009 (regular season)
- Cost: US$900 million ($1.35 billion in 2025 dollars)
- Architect: HOK Sport (now Populous)
- Structural engineer: WSP Cantor Seinuk
- Services engineers: M-E Engineers, Inc.
- General contractor: Hunt/Bovis Lend Lease Alliance II (a joint venture)
- Main contractor: International Concrete Products

Tenants
- New York Mets (MLB) (2009–present); New York City FC (MLS) (2022–present, part-time); Gotham FC (NWSL) (selected matches)

Website
- mlb.com/mets/ballpark

Citi Field is a baseball stadium located in Flushing Meadows–Corona Park, in the borough of Queens, New York City, United States. Opened in 2009, Citi Field is the home of Major League Baseball's New York Mets. The ballpark was built as a replacement for the adjacent Shea Stadium, which had been demolished shortly before Citi Field's opening.

Citi Field was designed by the company Populous. The $850 million baseball park was funded with $615 million in public subsidies, including the sale of New York City municipal bonds that are to be repaid by the Mets with interest. The payments will offset property taxes for the lifetime of the park.

The first game at Citi Field was on March 29, 2009, with a college baseball game between the St. John's Red Storm and Georgetown Hoyas. The Mets played their first two games at the ballpark on April 3 and 4, 2009 against the Boston Red Sox as charity exhibition games. The first regular-season home game was played on April 13, 2009, against the San Diego Padres. Citi Field hosted the 2013 Major League Baseball All-Star Game, marking the second time the Mets have hosted the event (the first being in 1964, the inaugural season of Shea Stadium).

The naming rights were purchased by Citigroup, a New York financial services company, for $20 million annually.

== History ==
=== Planning ===
Since the 1990s, the Mets were looking to replace Shea Stadium. It had originally been built as a multi-purpose stadium in 1964. While it had been retrofitted as a baseball-only stadium after the NFL's New York Jets left for Giants Stadium after the 1983 season, it was still not optimal for baseball, with seating located farther away from the playing field compared to other major league ballparks. The team unveiled a preliminary model of the ballpark in 1998; it featured a retractable roof and a movable grass field, which would have allowed it to host events including conventions and college basketball. The Mets also considered moving to Mitchel Field or Belmont Park in Nassau County, Long Island; Sunnyside Yard in Queens, or the West Side Yard in Manhattan.

In December 2001, shortly before leaving office, New York City mayor Rudy Giuliani announced "tentative agreements" for both the Mets and the New York Yankees to build new stadiums. Of the $1.6 billion sought for the stadiums, city and state taxpayers would pick up half the tab for construction, $800 million, along with $390 million on extra transportation. The plan also said that the teams would be allowed to keep all parking revenues, which state officials had already said they wanted to keep to compensate the state for building new garages for the teams. The teams would keep 96% of ticket revenues and 100% of all other revenues, not pay sales tax or property tax on the stadium, and would get low-cost electricity from New York state. Business officials criticized the plan as giving too much money to successful teams with little reason to move to a different city.

Michael Bloomberg, who succeeded Giuliani as mayor, exercised the escape clause in the agreements to back out of both deals, saying that the city could not afford to build new stadiums for the Mets and Yankees. Bloomberg said that, unbeknownst to him, Giuliani had inserted a clause in this deal that loosened the teams' leases with the city and would allow the Mets and Yankees to leave the city on 60 days notice to find a new home elsewhere if the city backed out of the agreement. At the time, Bloomberg said that publicly funded stadiums were a poor investment. Under Bloomberg, the New York City government would only offer public financing for infrastructure improvements; the teams would have to pay for the stadiums themselves. Bloomberg called the former mayor's agreements "corporate welfare". Giuliani had already been instrumental in the construction of taxpayer-funded minor league baseball facilities MCU Park for the Mets' minor league Brooklyn Cyclones and Richmond County Bank Ballpark for the Staten Island Yankees.

The final plans for what is now Citi Field were created as part of the unsuccessful New York City 2012 Olympic bid. After plans for a West Side Stadium fell through, New York looked for an alternate stadium to host the opening and closing ceremonies and track and field. The Olympic Stadium project on the West Side was estimated to cost $2.2 billion, with $300 million provided by New York City and an additional $300 million from New York State. If New York had won the bid, Citi Field would have been expanded to Olympic events while the Mets would have played at Yankee Stadium in the Bronx for the 2012 season. By then, however, the failure of the West Side Stadium proposal had hurt New York's chances of winning the 2012 games. The 2012 Summer Olympics were ultimately awarded to London.

=== Construction ===
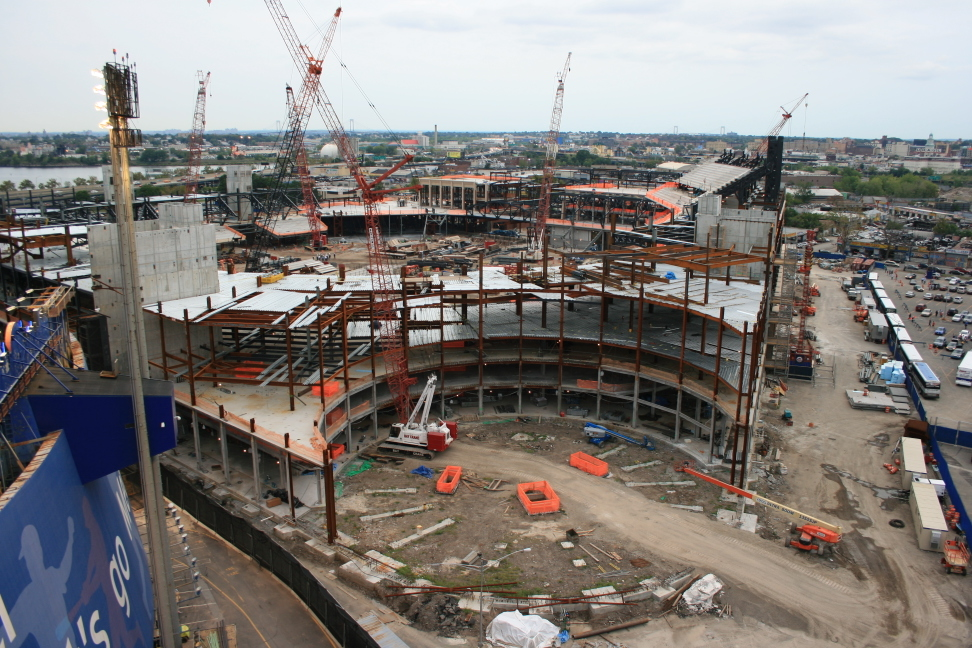
Citi Field under construction on September 14, 2007

The projected cost of the new ballpark and other infrastructure improvements was $610 million, with the Mets picking up $420 million of that amount. The agreement included a 40-year lease that would keep the Mets in New York until 2049. The Mets own the stadium through a wholly owned subsidiary, Queens Ballpark Company.

On March 18, 2006, the New York Mets unveiled the official model for the new ballpark. By July 2006, initial construction of the new park was underway in the parking lot beyond Shea Stadium's left-field, with a projected finish of late March ahead of Opening Day 2009.

By April 13, 2008, all of the structure for the Jackie Robinson Rotunda was in place with the arched windows receiving their paneling and glass. By September 2008, most of the Citi Field signage had been installed. By December 1, 2008, all of the seats and the playing field had been installed.

=== Modifications ===
During the 2010 off-season, the bullpen area in right-center field underwent a complete renovation. When the edifice opened in time for the start of the 2009 MLB season, the Mets' bullpen was in front of the visiting bullpen, leading to an obstructed view of the field from the visiting bullpen, which the San Diego Padres complained about during the Mets' first regular-season home series. The bullpens were turned 90°, with pitchers throwing toward the field instead of parallel to it. More Mets team colors, player banners and logos were also added throughout the ballpark, including revamping the "Let's Go Mets" slogan on the Citi Vision board so that the word "Mets" appears in its traditional script instead of the same font as the rest of the slogan. Additionally, the height of the home run boundary line directly in front of the Home Run Apple in center field was reduced from 16 feet (4.9 m) to 8 feet (2.4 m) in an attempt to produce more home runs.

During its first three seasons, the large field dimensions caused Citi Field to play as an extreme "pitcher's park", and home-runs at the stadium were among the fewest in the Major Leagues. Mets' general manager Sandy Alderson changed Citi Field's dimensions in time for the 2012 MLB season in order to make it more friendly to hitters. Changes included building an 8 feet (2.4 m) wall in front of the high 16 feet (4.9 m) wall in left field that many had dubbed the "Great Wall of Flushing", removing the nook in the "Mo's Zone" in right field, and reducing the distance in right center field from 415 feet (126 m) from home plate to 390 feet (120 m). The new walls are colored blue in order to address fan complaints that the old black walls with orange trims did not reflect the colors of the Mets. The Mets also created a new seating section located in between the old and new left field walls called the Party City Party Deck, renamed the M&M's Sweet Seats in 2016 after change of sponsorship, and can accommodate 102 additional fans.

The center and right-center outfield wall were brought in to 380 feet (120 m) for the 2015 season.

On March 21, 2019, the Mets announced on Twitter that Citi Field's permanent address would be changed to 41 Seaver Way, in honor of former Mets Hall of Fame pitcher Tom Seaver whose number was 41. The ceremony was held on June 27, 2019, and was part of the weekend set aside for celebrating the 50th anniversary of the 1969 World Series champion Mets.

In 2023, the right field fence was moved in 8 feet (2.4 m), removing the nook and creating a new fan experience, and the scoreboard in center field was replaced with a new one measuring 17,400 square feet (1,620 m^{2}), the largest in any MLB ballpark.

=== Metropolitan Park ===
Metropolitan Park is a planned $8 billion, 50-acre park, casino and entertainment complex which will be built in the parking lots adjacent to Citi Field. The final approval for the project was given by the New York State government on December 15, 2025 and is scheduled to open in 2030.

== Features ==
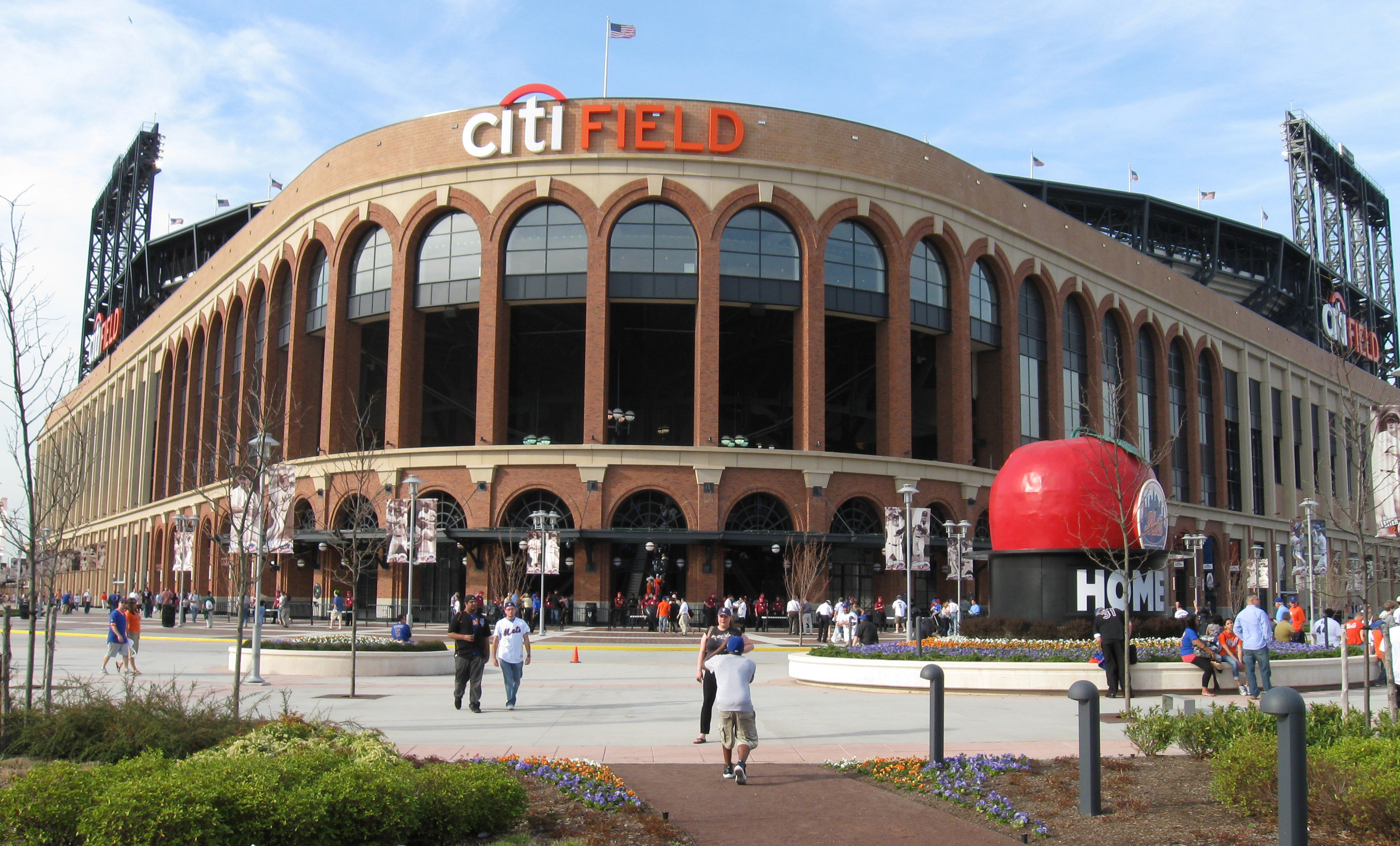
Entrance to Citi Field through the Jackie Robinson Rotunda, with Shea Stadium's Home Run Apple on the right

Citi Field has a capacity of 41,922. It has over 15,000 fewer seats than Shea Stadium. The majority of the seats are green – an homage to the Polo Grounds, longtime home of the baseball Giants and the original home of the Mets – as opposed to Shea's orange, blue, red and green assortment. The exterior facade is reminiscent of Ebbets Field (which was long sought by then-Mets owner Fred Wilpon, a Brooklyn native).

Citi Field's interior design is primarily influenced by the Pittsburgh Pirates' PNC Park, which was the favorite ballpark of Mets COO Jeff Wilpon. Other influences include Great American Ball Park, Coors Field, and Citizens Bank Park. Citi Field is the only ballpark in Major League Baseball to feature orange foul poles instead of the standard yellow, a unique characteristic that was carried over from Shea Stadium.

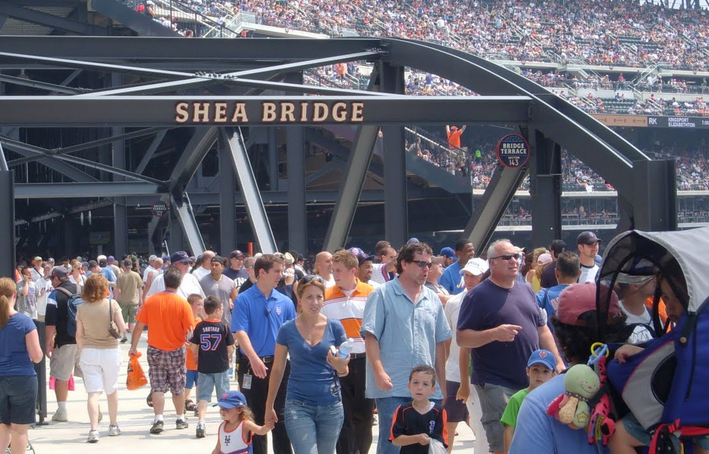
Shea Bridge

Citi Field features an overarching bridge motif in its architecture, as New York City is linked by 2,027 bridges and is reflected in the Mets logo, as the team is the symbolic bridge to the city's past National League teams, the New York Giants and the Brooklyn Dodgers. In the outfield section of the ballpark, there is a pedestrian bridge named Shea Bridge that resembles the Hell Gate Bridge.

Similar to Shea Stadium, Citi Field's field dimensions ensure it is a pitcher-friendly park. The Coca-Cola Corner, originally known as the Pepsi Porch, hangs over the field in right field, extending far beyond the indentation of the Clubhouse and is inspired by Tiger Stadium's right field porch. The Pepsi sign that sat atop the area (2009–2015) was modeled after the one alongside the East River in Gantry Plaza State Park; it was replaced by Coca-Cola's logo in 2016 upon assuming the role of a Mets sponsor.

In 2012, the Mets added the Party City Party Deck in left field because they moved the fences in. The Party Deck is very similar to The Royals' Pepsi Party Porch.

Delta Air Lines signed a multiyear deal on September 15, 2008, to sponsor an exclusive section in Citi Field. The Delta Sky360 Club is a 22,500-square-foot (2,090 m^{2}) restaurant-cafe-bar-lounge complex that also houses 1,600 premium seats behind home plate stretching from dugout to dugout.

=== Jackie Robinson Rotunda ===
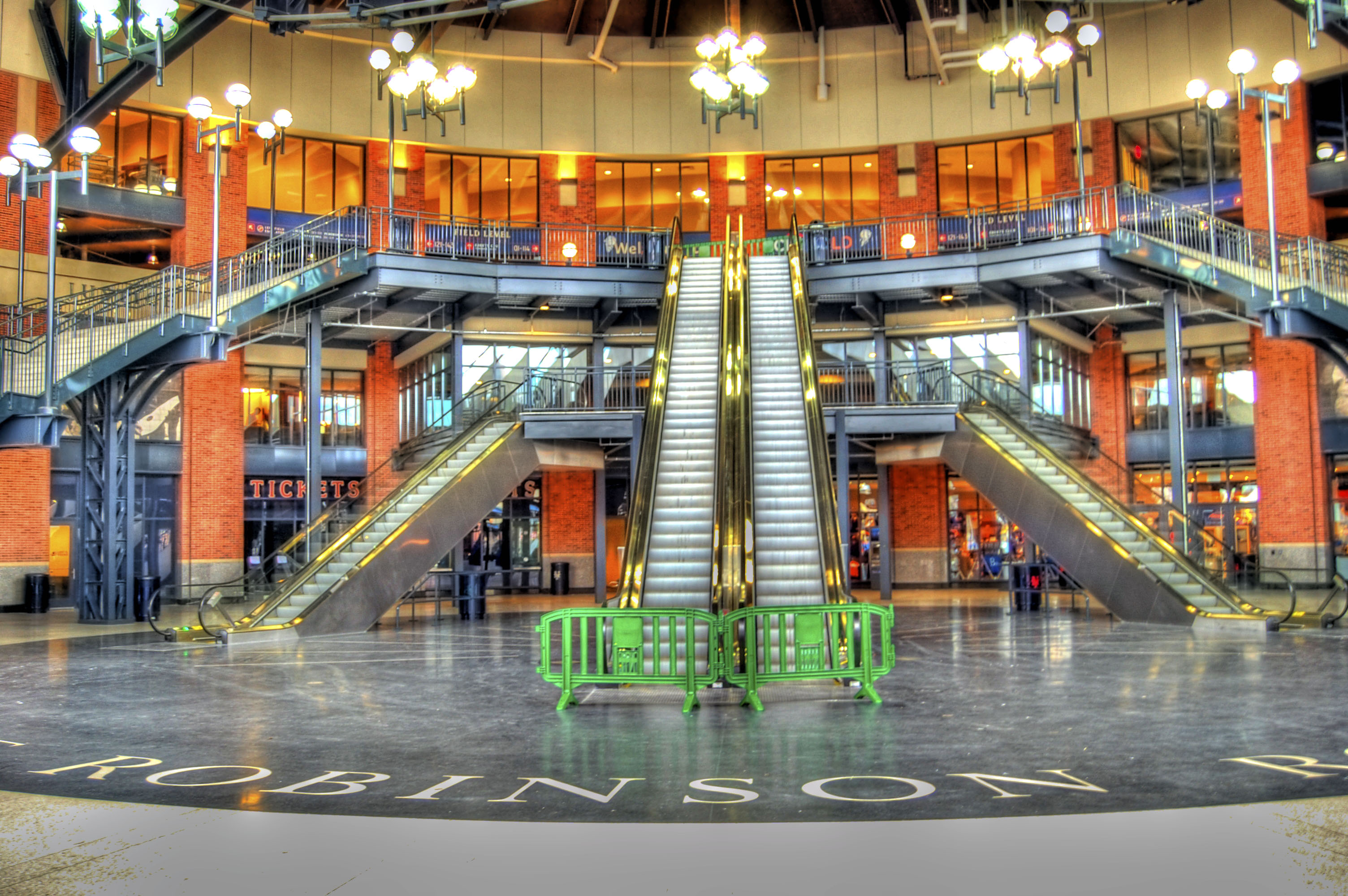
The interior of the Jackie Robinson Rotunda

The front entrance of Citi Field features a rotunda named after Brooklyn Dodgers legend Jackie Robinson and honors his life and accomplishments. Engraved into the rotunda's 160-foot-diameter (49 m) floor and etched into the archways are words and larger-than-life images that defined Robinson's nine values: Courage, Excellence, Persistence, Justice, Teamwork, Commitment, Citizenship, Determination and Integrity.

Robinson's famous quote: "A life is not important except in the impact it has on other lives" is engraved into the upper ring of the rotunda. There is also an 8-foot (2.4 m) sculpture of Robinson's number 42. The formal dedication of the Jackie Robinson Rotunda was held as part of Major League Baseball's official celebration of Jackie Robinson Day on April 15, 2009.

=== Home Run Apple ===
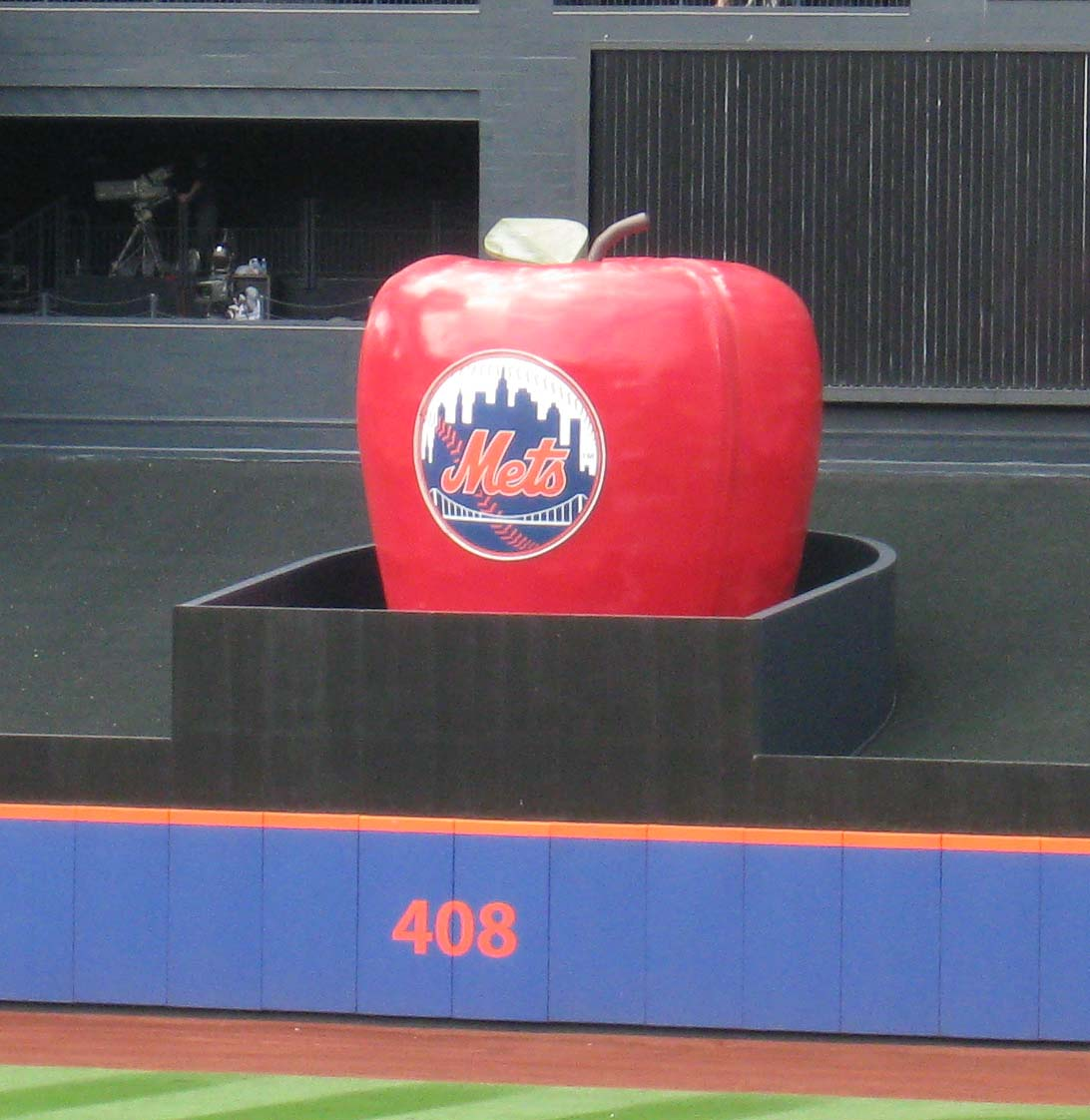
Citi Field's Home Run Apple located in center field

Another tradition from Shea Stadium carried over into Citi Field is the Home Run Apple. When a Mets player hits a home run, a giant apple, which has a Mets logo on the front that lights up, rises from its housing in the center field batter's eye. The new apple that was constructed for Citi Field is more than four times the size of the previous one and was designed by Minneapolis-based engineering firm Uni-Systems.

During the 2009 season, the original Shea apple was located in Bullpen Plaza, just inside the Bullpen Gate entrance. In 2010, it was relocated outside the ballpark in Mets Plaza to the area between the Jackie Robinson Rotunda and the entrance to the Mets–Willets Point subway station.

=== Tom Seaver statue ===
On April 15, 2022, at their season home opener, the Mets unveiled a statue of Tom Seaver, created by sculptor William Behrends. It is located in Mets Plaza, next to the Shea Stadium Home Run Apple.

=== Grimace seat ===
On September 16, 2024, the Mets installed a purple seat in Section 302, Row 6, Seat 12 to honor the McDonaldland character Grimace, who had been embraced by the fans when the team went on a seven-game winning streak after he threw the first pitch on the June 12, 2024 game against the Miami Marlins.

=== Amenities and facilities ===
Behind the center field scoreboard is the FanFest area, an expanded family entertainment area that includes a miniature wiffleball field replica of Citi Field called Mr. Met's Kiddie Field, a batting cage, a dunk tank, video game kiosks and other attractions.

Citi Field offers a wide choice of eateries. Taste of the City is a food court located in the center field section of the ballpark. It features food from restaurateur Danny Meyer's Union Square Hospitality Group and includes a variety of stands, including Shake Shack (burgers, fries, shakes), Blue Smoke (barbecue), El Verano Taqueria (Mexican cuisine), Catch of the Day (featuring seafood from chef Dave Pasternack of Esca), and Box Frites (Belgian French fries); the Shake Shack stand also has the New York skyline replica that topped the old scoreboard at Shea Stadium above it. The World's Fare Market is located on the field level in right field and features sushi from Daruma of Tokyo, sandwiches and pastries from Mama's of Corona, Chinese cuisine from Tai Pan Bakery and Korean food from Café Hanover. Citi Field also offers a choice of fresh fruit at several stands around the stadium.

In 2010 Citi Field upgraded the food choices on the Promenade Level behind home plate. Blue Smoke BBQ and Box Frites both open a second location.

Restaurants and clubs are also available in every level of the ballpark. The 350-seat Acela Club (now Porsche Grill) located in left field on the Excelsior Level, is the dining highlight of the new park and features a full view of the playing field as well as food from Drew Nieporent's Myriad Restaurant Group, renowned for Nobu and Tribeca Grill. Admission into the high-end luxury Porsche Grill and Delta Sky360 Club, and including the other semi-luxury clubs are exclusive to high-end ticket holders only, and some restaurants enforce that reservations be made. A McFadden's Restaurant and Saloon opened at Citi Field in 2010. It is located directly under the Good Humor FanFest and is open to the public year-round.

=== Mets Hall of Fame & Museum ===
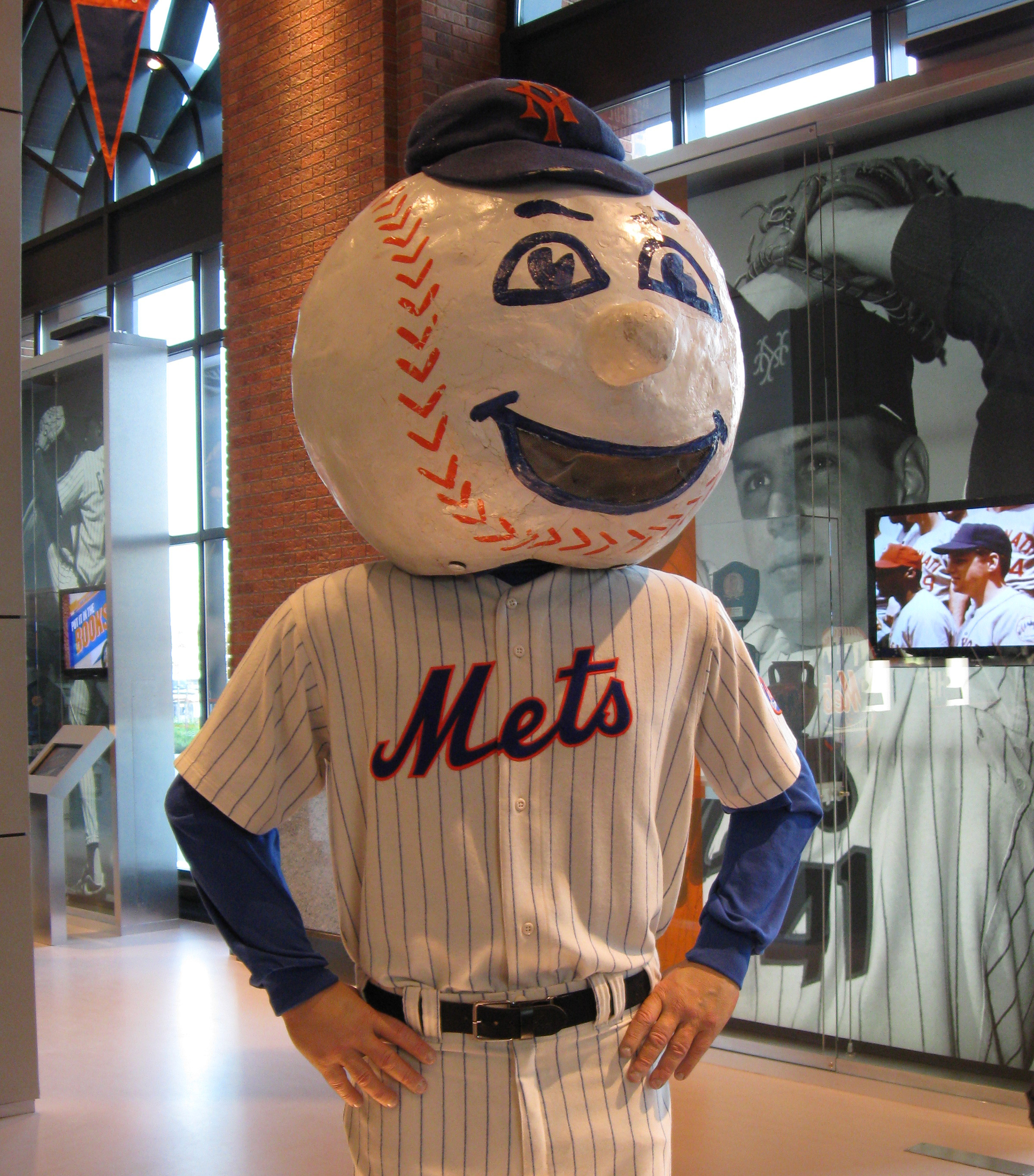
The original Mr. Met costume is one of the many exhibits on display at the Mets Hall of Fame and Museum

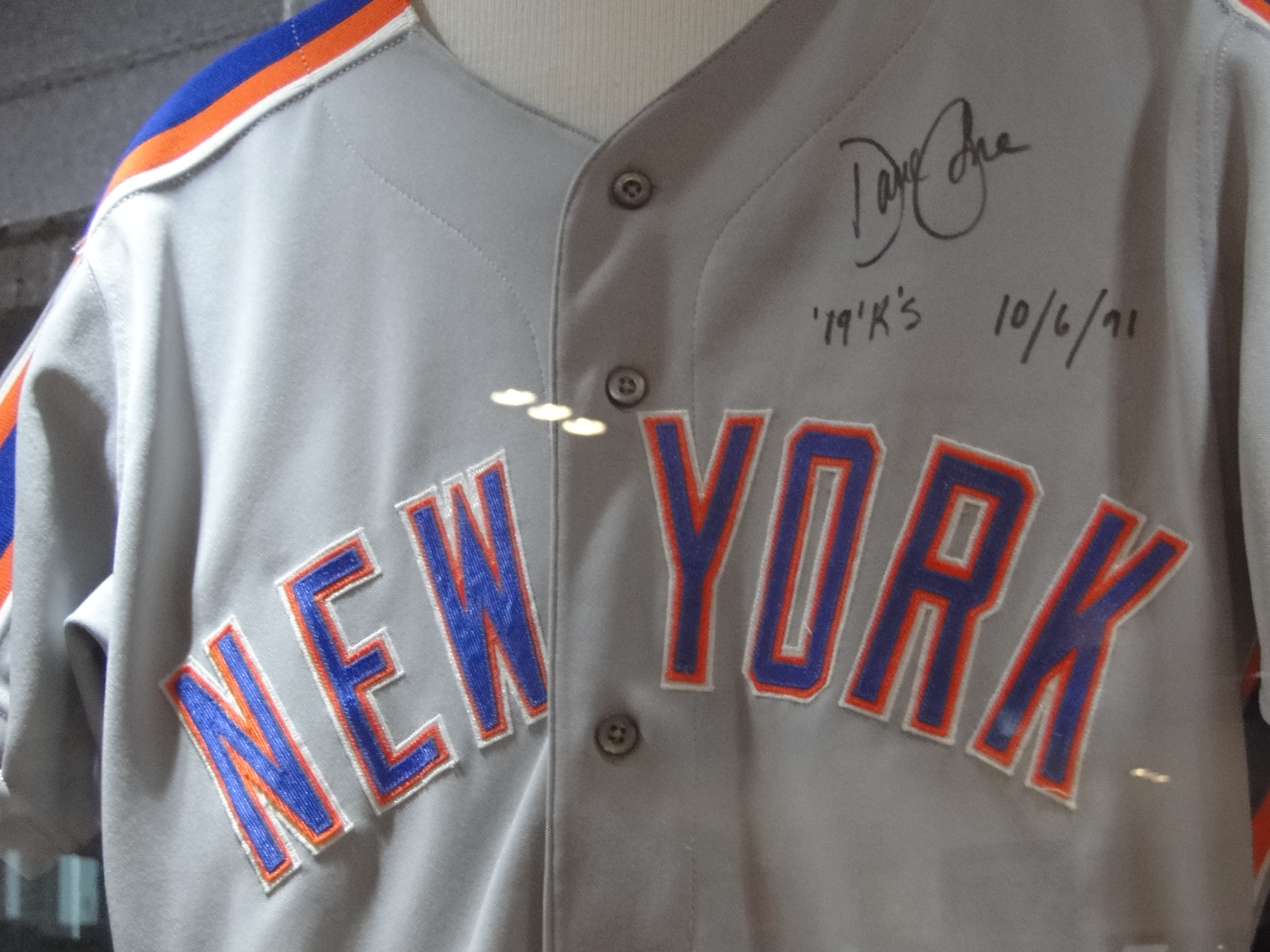
David Cone's jersey from his 19 strikeout game on October 6, 1991, housed in the Mets Hall of Fame and Museum

The Mets Hall of Fame & Museum is located adjacent to the Jackie Robinson Rotunda on the first base side and opened on April 5, 2010. The museum includes plaques honoring the inductees of the New York Mets Hall of Fame, the team's World Series trophies from 1969 and 1986, as well as artifacts on loan from noted collectors, former players and the National Baseball Hall of Fame and Museum. The museum boasts several displays including autographed memorabilia, original scouting reports on players such as Darryl Strawberry, and handwritten notes from the team's first manager Casey Stengel. In addition to this the team has installed interactive touchscreens, television screens, and timelines that guide visitors through various aspects of the franchise's history.

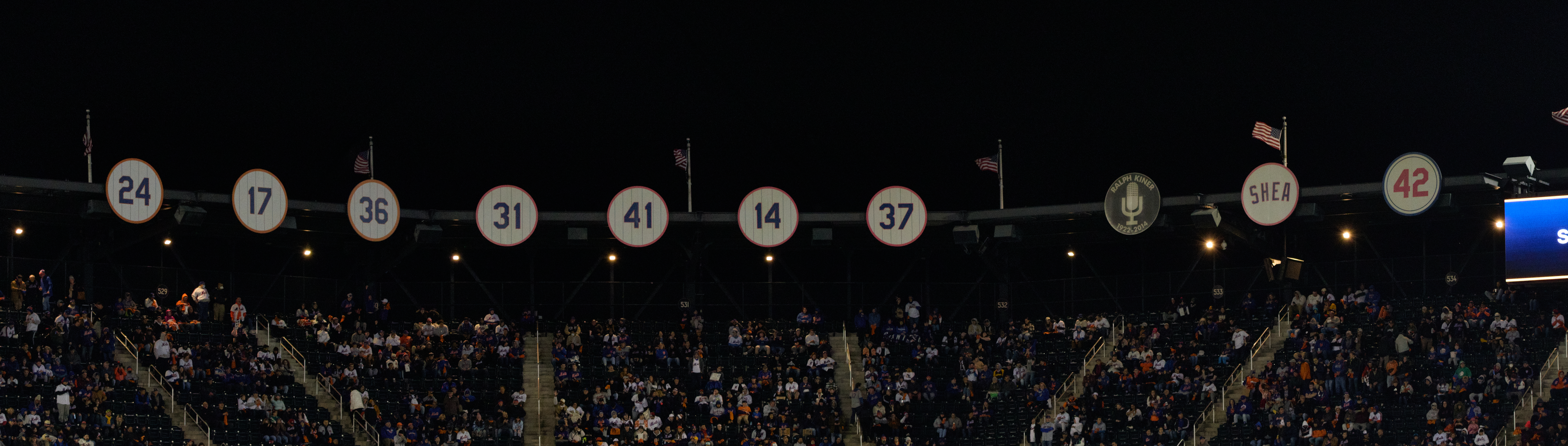
Mets retired numbers 2022

== Public opinion ==
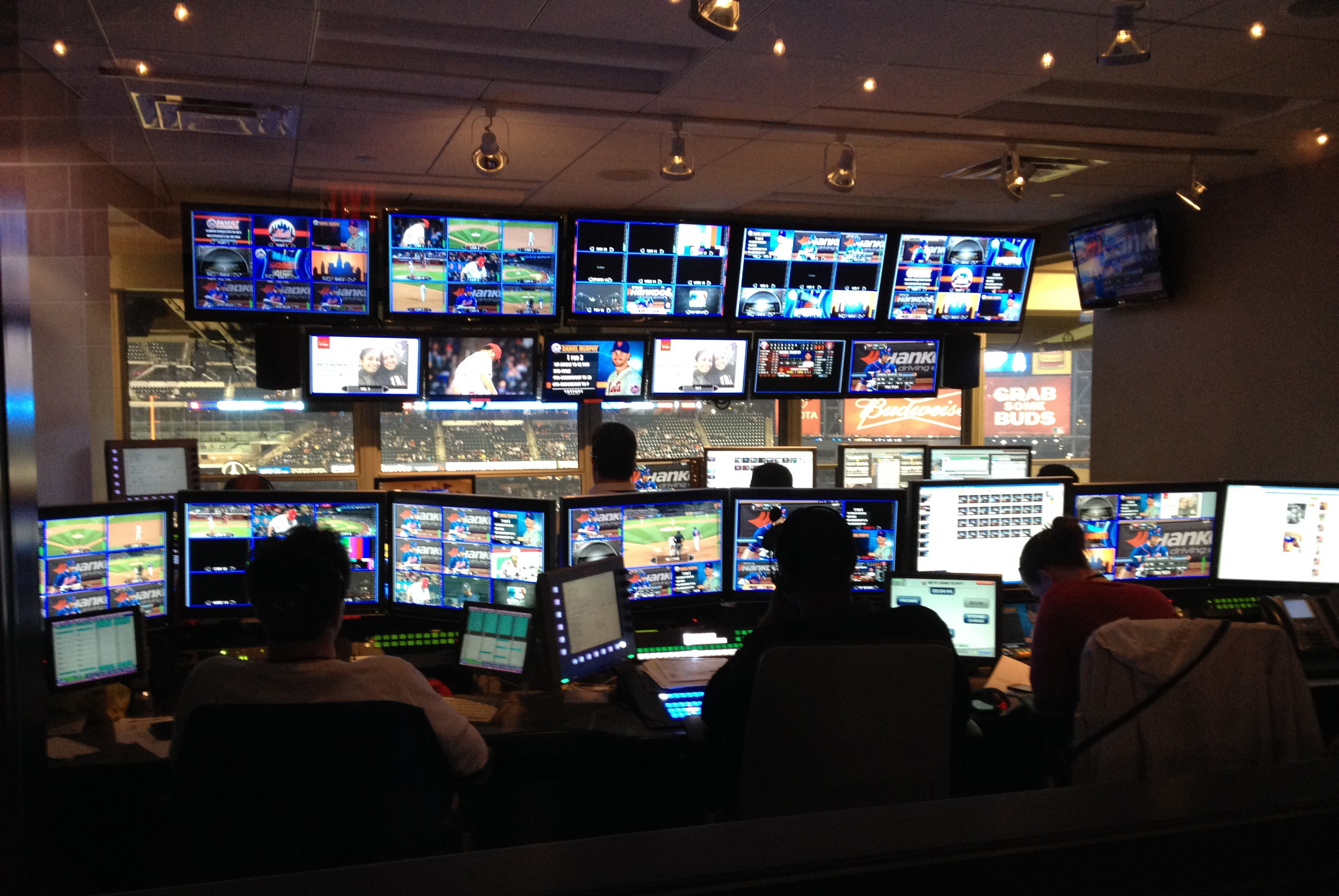
The Scoreboard Operations booth was visible to fans through a window on the concourse of the Excelsior level. The window was walled up prior to the 2022 season

Business Insider praised the stadium for its aesthetics and named it one of the top 100 venues in sports, while BaseballParks.com called it "perfect" and especially lauded the Jackie Robinson Rotunda. Reviewers also praised the many culinary offerings at Citi Field's concession stands.

Despite the modern amenities, the new Citi Field was not without criticism. Fans complained of obstructed views and an overemphasis on the celebration of the Brooklyn Dodgers' legacy over the history of the Mets. Mets owner Fred Wilpon, a Brooklyn native, had grown up a Brooklyn Dodgers fan and admitted to going overboard. Legal analyst Jeffrey Toobin wrote in The New Yorker,

When Citi Field opened, the Brooklyn focus drew some criticism. After all, the Dodgers left Brooklyn in 1957, and Ebbets Field was demolished shortly thereafter. Only the very oldest fans have any first-hand memory of the place. The Mets, who had been in existence for almost a half century, were virtually ignored in their own home. 'All the Dodger stuff—that was an error of judgment on my part,' Wilpon told me.

In response to these criticisms, the team installed photographic imagery of famous players and historic moments in Mets history on the Field and Promenade levels as well as the display of team championship banners on the left-field wall during the 2009 season. They also constructed a Mets Hall of Fame and Museum prior to the 2010 season, located adjacent to the Jackie Robinson Rotunda, and changed the color of the outfield wall from black to Mets blue prior to the 2012 season, which many Mets fans had campaigned for. The team also worked on fixing the obstructed views in the Promenade level.

During its first three seasons in existence, Citi Field played as an extreme "pitcher's park", and was cited as the cause of the decreased offensive production of David Wright and Jason Bay. Wright hit only 10 home runs in 2009 after hitting 30 or more in each of the previous two seasons, while Bay had the worst offensive production of his career in his first season with the Mets in 2010, hitting only 6 home runs, with an on-base percentage of just .347, and a career low .402 slugging percentage. Jeff Francoeur, who played with the Mets during their first two years at Citi Field, criticized the ballpark's dimensions, calling it "a damn joke". During the 2011 season, Citi Field allowed 1.33 home runs per game, the third lowest total out of the 16 National League ballparks. The team responded by altering the ballpark dimensions for the 2012 season, creating a much more neutral ballpark. Wright's 2012 offensive numbers improved due to the alterations. "It's a huge difference", Wright said. "It allows you to relax and know you don't have to try to hit the ball a mile to see results. And at the same time, if you do hit the ball well and you see results, instead of a 400-foot (120 m) flyout, you're 1-for-1 and feeling good about yourself."

== Access and transportation ==
Attractions and geographical features of Flushing Meadows–Corona Park
Attractions and geographical features of Flushing Meadows–Corona Park:
1 Citi Field
2 Etihad Park (under construction)
3 Flushing Meadows Carousel and Queens Zoo
4 Flushing Meadows Corona Park Aquatics Center
5 Flushing River and Creek
6 Meadow Lake and Hong Kong Dragon Boat Festival
7 Metropolitan Park (planned) and Shea Stadium (demolished)
8 Mets–Willets Point subway station
9 Mets–Willets Point LIRR station
10 National Tennis Center and United States Pavilion (demolished)
11 New York Hall of Science
12 New York State Pavilion and Queens Theatre
13 Queens Botanical Garden
14 Queens Museum
15 Queens Night Market
16 Terrace on the Park
17 Unisphere
18 Willow Lake
19 World's Fair subway station (demolished)

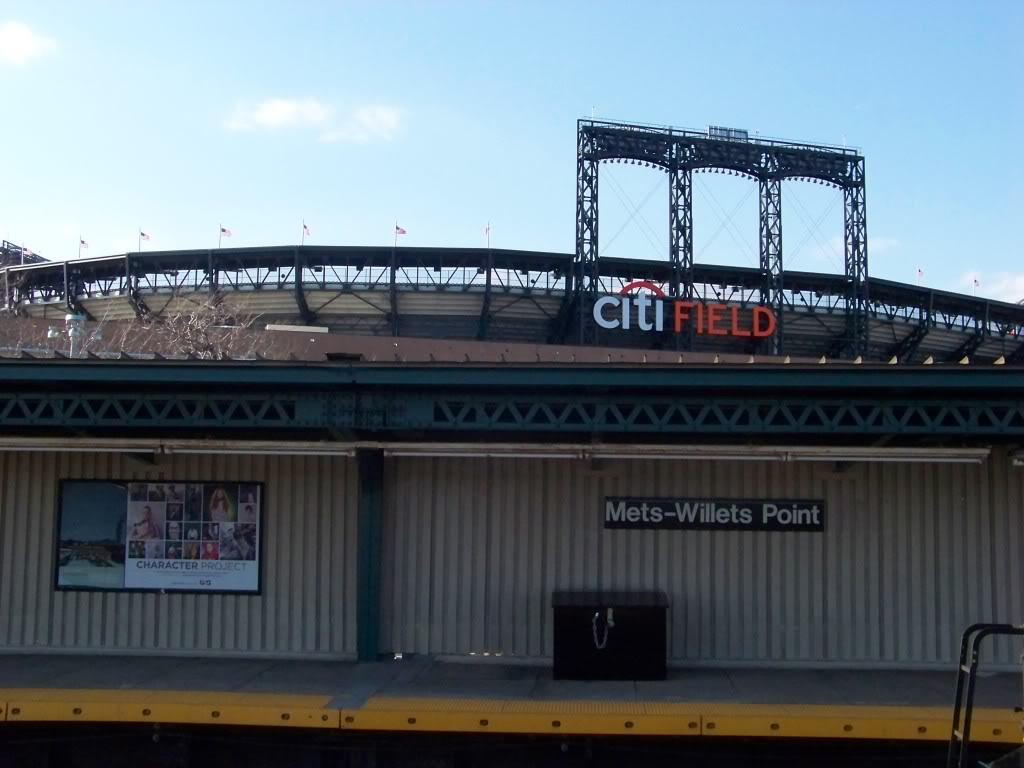
Citi Field is serviced by the IRT Flushing Line at the Mets – Willets Point station

Citi Field is located in the borough of Queens, adjacent to the neighborhoods of Corona, which lies to its west, and Willets Point and Flushing to the east. Flushing Bay is to the north, and the rest of Flushing Meadows–Corona Park is to the south. Because it lies within the Flushing postal zone, and because of its location in Flushing Meadows–Corona Park, Citi Field is frequently referred to as being in Flushing proper.

Citi Field is accessible via the New York City Subway via the IRT Flushing Line (7 and <7> trains) at the Mets–Willets Point station, the Q19, Q66 and Q90 buses, and the Long Island Rail Road station on the Port Washington Branch, also called Mets–Willets Point. The park is also close to several major thoroughfares, including the Grand Central Parkway, the Whitestone and Van Wyck Expressways, the Long Island Expressway, Roosevelt Avenue, Northern Boulevard and Astoria Boulevard.

=== Park and rides ===
Since the construction of Citi Field began, satellite parking lots in Flushing Meadow Park (access from College Point Boulevard) have been opened. Some of these have been designated as park and rides, used by commuters connecting to the subway and buses.

In 2020, Columbia Transportation started a commuter service, the Queens-Riverdale Commuter Route to the Southfield Parking Lot, mainly for commuters from Queens to go to before boarding the bus to Columbia University. This service was discontinued in December 2021.

== Attendance records ==
=== Overall ===
Bold indicates the winner of each game.

**Highest attendance at Citi Field**
Rank	Attendance	Date	About	Notes
1	45,186	July 16, 2013	National League 0, **American League 3**	2013 MLB All Star Game
2	44,859	November 1, 2015	Mets 2, **Royals 7** (12 innings)	2015 World Series (Game 5)
3	44,815	October 31, 2015	Mets 3, **Royals 5**	2015 World Series (Game 4)
4	44,781	October 30, 2015	**Mets 9**, Royals 3	2015 World Series (Game 3)
5	44,747	October 5, 2016	Mets 0, **Giants 3**	2016 National League Wild Card Game
6	44,502	October 18, 2015	**Mets 4**, Cubs 1	2015 NLCS (Game 2)
7	44,466	April 30, 2016	**Mets 6**, Giants 5	Regular season record
8	44,424	April 4, 2019	Mets 0, **Nationals 4**	2019 Opening Day
9	44,384	April 3, 2017	**Mets 6**, Braves 0	2017 Opening Day
10	44,287	October 17, 2015	**Mets 4**, Cubs 2	2015 NLCS (Game 1)

=== Regular season ===
Bold indicates the winner of each game.

**Highest regular season attendance at Citi Field**
Rank	Attendance	Date	Game result	Notes
1	44,466	April 30, 2016	**Mets 6**, Giants 5	
2	44,424	April 4, 2019	Mets 0, **Nationals 4**	2019 Home Opener
3	44,384	April 3, 2017	**Mets 6**, Braves 0	2017 Home Opener
4	44,189	March 29, 2018	**Mets 9**, Cardinals 4	2018 Home Opener
5	44,152	September 21, 2024	**Mets 6**, Phillies 3	
6	44,099	April 8, 2016	**Mets 7**, Phillies 2	2016 Home Opener
7	43,947	April 13, 2015	**Mets 2**, Phillies 0	2015 Home Opener
8	43,945	April 4, 2025	**Mets 5**, Blue Jays 0	2025 Home Opener
9	43,928	September 29, 2018	**Mets 1**, Marlins 0	David Wright's last game
10	43,875	August 10, 2019	**Mets 4**, Nationals 3	

=== Progression ===
Bold indicates the winner of each game.

**Progression of attendance records at Citi Field**
Regular Season	Mets	Overall
41,007 – April 13, 2009; Mets 5, **Padres 6**
41,103 – May 25, 2009; **Mets 5**, Nationals 2
41,221 – June 25, 2009; **Mets 3**, Cardinals 2
41,278 – June 26, 2009; Mets 1, **Yankees 9**
41,302 – June 27, 2009; Mets 0, **Yankees 5**
41,315 – June 28, 2009; Mets 2, **Yankees 5**
41,382 – May 21, 2010; Mets 1, **Yankees 2**
41,422 – May 23, 2010; **Mets 6**, Yankees 4
42,020 – July 1, 2011; Mets 1, **Yankees 5**
42,042 – July 2, 2011; Mets 2, **Yankees 5**
42,080 – April 5, 2012; **Mets 1**, Braves 0
42,122 – June 23, 2012; Mets 3, **Yankees 4**
42,364 – June 24, 2012; Mets 5, **Yankees 6**
42,516 – July 3, 2012; **Mets 11**, Phillies 1
42,516 – July 3, 2012; **Mets 11**, Phillies 1		45,186 – July 16, 2013; N.L. 0, **A.L. 3**; 2013 All Star Game
43,947 – April 13, 2015; **Mets 2**, Phillies 0		45,186 – July 16, 2013; N.L. 0, **A.L. 3**; 2013 All Star Game
43,947 – April 13, 2015; **Mets 2**, Phillies 0	44,276 – October 12, 2015; **Mets 13**, Dodgers 7; 2015 NLDS Game 3	45,186 – July 16, 2013; N.L. 0, **A.L. 3**; 2013 All Star Game
43,947 – April 13, 2015; **Mets 2**, Phillies 0	44,287 – October 17, 2015; **Mets 4**, Cubs 1; 2015 NLCS Game 1	45,186 – July 16, 2013; N.L. 0, **A.L. 3**; 2013 All Star Game
43,947 – April 13, 2015; **Mets 2**, Phillies 0	44,502 – October 18, 2015; **Mets 4**, Cubs 1; 2015 NLCS Game 2	45,186 – July 16, 2013; N.L. 0, **A.L. 3**; 2013 All Star Game
43,947 – April 13, 2015; **Mets 2**, Phillies 0	44,781 – October 30, 2015; **Mets 9**, Royals 3; 2015 World Series Game 3	45,186 – July 16, 2013; N.L. 0, **A.L. 3**; 2013 All Star Game
43,947 – April 13, 2015; **Mets 2**, Phillies 0	44,781 – October 31, 2015; Mets 3, **Royals 5**; 2015 World Series Game 4	45,186 – July 16, 2013; N.L. 0, **A.L. 3**; 2013 All Star Game
43,947 – April 13, 2015; **Mets 2**, Phillies 0	44,859 – November 1, 2015; Mets 2, **Royals 7** (12 innings); 2015 World Series Game 5	45,186 – July 16, 2013; N.L. 0, **A.L. 3**; 2013 All Star Game
44,099 – April 8, 2016; **Mets 7**, Phillies 2	44,859 – November 1, 2015; Mets 2, **Royals 7** (12 innings); 2015 World Series Game 5	45,186 – July 16, 2013; N.L. 0, **A.L. 3**; 2013 All Star Game
44,466 – April 30, 2016; **Mets 6**, Giants 5	44,859 – November 1, 2015; Mets 2, **Royals 7** (12 innings); 2015 World Series Game 5	45,186 – July 16, 2013; N.L. 0, **A.L. 3**; 2013 All Star Game

== Naming rights ==
On November 13, 2006, it was announced that the ballpark would be called Citi Field, named for Citigroup Inc. Citigroup will be paying $20 million a year for the naming rights to the park over the next 20 years. This made Citi Field the second major league sports venue in the New York metropolitan area and the first in the city itself to be named for a corporate sponsor. At the time, the Meadowlands Arena in New Jersey's Meadowlands Sports Complex had carried the Continental Airlines name. The deal includes an option on both sides to extend the contract to 40 years, and is the most expensive sports-stadium naming rights agreement ever, subsequently equaled by MetLife Stadium's $400 million deal.

At the groundbreaking for Citi Field, it was announced that the main entrance, modeled on the one in Brooklyn's old Ebbets Field, would be called the Jackie Robinson Rotunda, possibly due to campaigns to forgo naming rights revenue and name the ballpark after Robinson. The Mets spent more than $600 million for the new ballpark, which New York City and New York state are also supporting with a total of $165 million for such costs as infrastructure and site preparation. On February 24, 2008, the Mets and Citigroup unveiled the new Citi Field logo.

=== Controversy ===
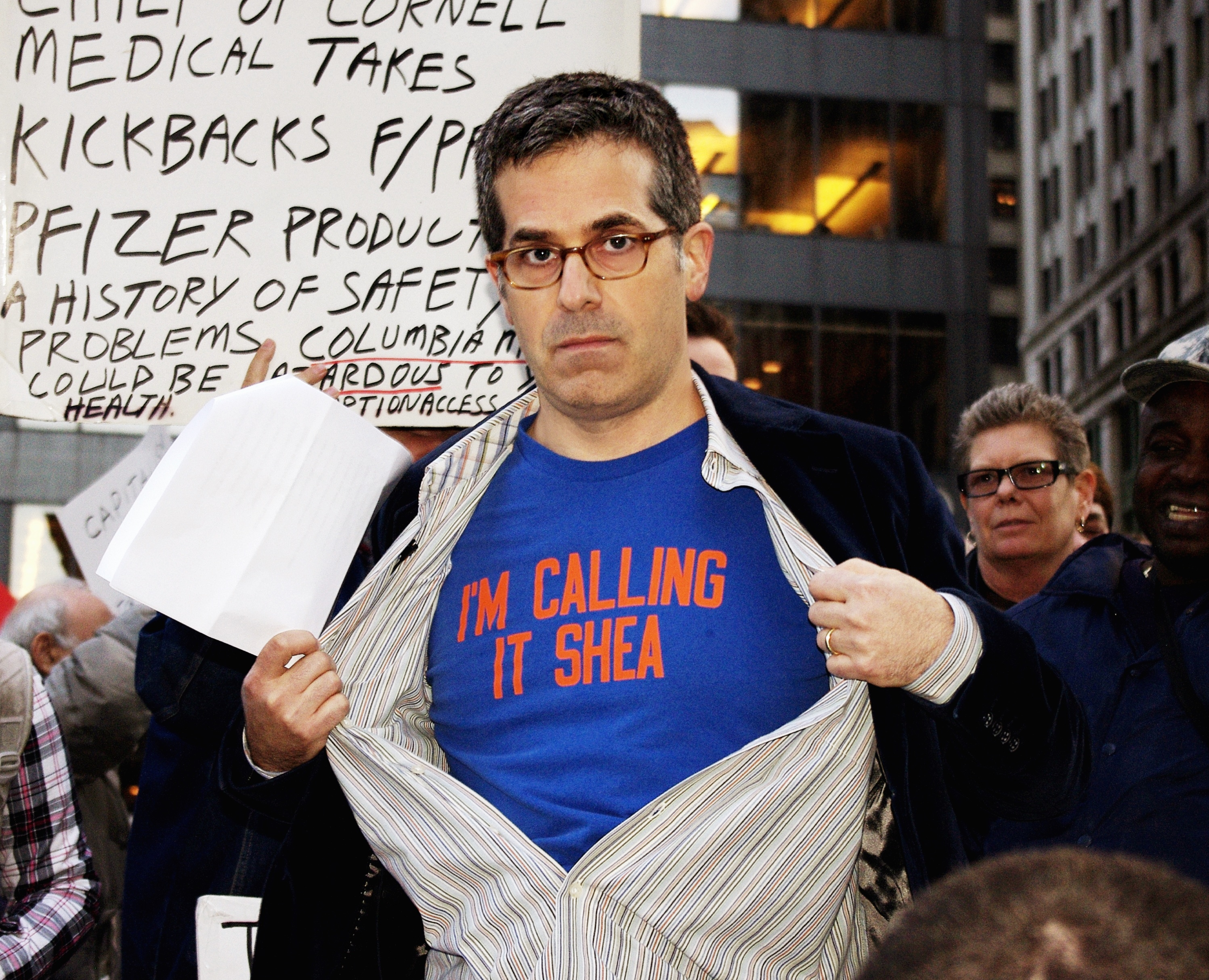
Jonathan Lethem at Occupy Wall Street protesting the naming rights given to Citigroup by referring to the demolished but non-sponsored Shea Stadium (which was named after William Shea), November 2011

The Citigroup naming rights deal, the most lucrative in history to that point, was criticized during the 2008 financial crisis, while $45 billion of taxpayer funds were loaned to Citigroup by the U.S. federal government in two rescue packages. Congressman Elijah Cummings of Maryland, who served on the United States House Committee on Oversight and Government Reform, stated in regards to the Citi Field naming rights deal, "This type of spending is indefensible and unacceptable to Citigroup's new partner and largest investor: the American taxpayer.... I strongly urge Citigroup to find a way out of this contract and instead spend that $400 million on retaining its employees and restoring confidence in its operations." The Wall Street Journal reported on February 3, 2009, that Citigroup considered breaking the naming rights deal. Instead, Citi stated that no government TARP funds would be used in the sponsorship deal. The naming rights controversy reemerged in a New York Times opinion piece when details about owner Fred Wilpon's involvement in Bernard Madoff's Ponzi scheme came to light and a lawsuit was filed on behalf of victims of Madoff's investment scandal in 2011. Citigroup paid back the loan in full, with interest, by 2014.

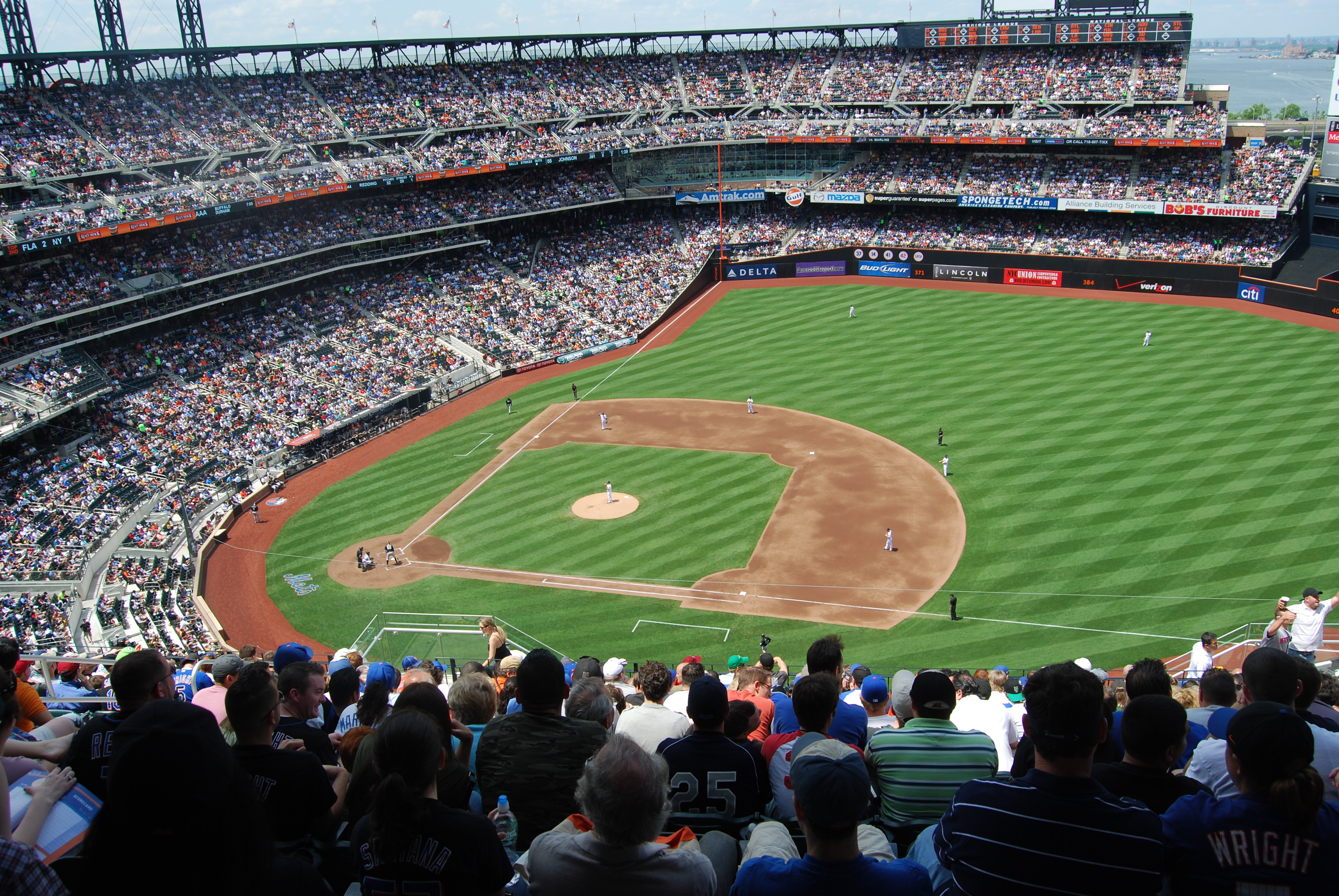
In its opening season, Citi Field drew over 3.1 million fans with a game average of 92.7% of seats filled, 4th best in baseball

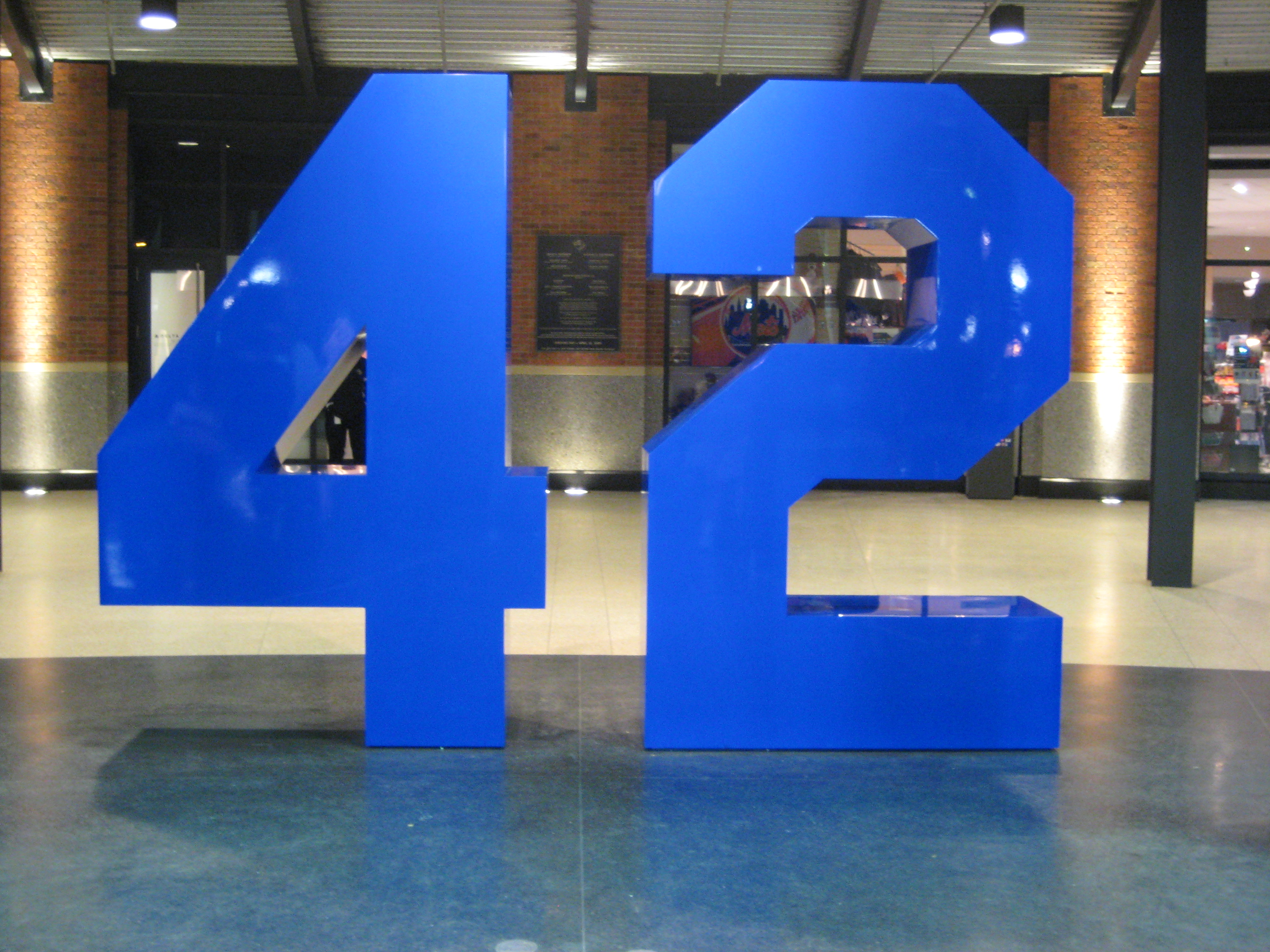
Memorial in the Jackie Robinson Rotunda inside Citi Field, dedicated April 15, 2009

== Notable events ==
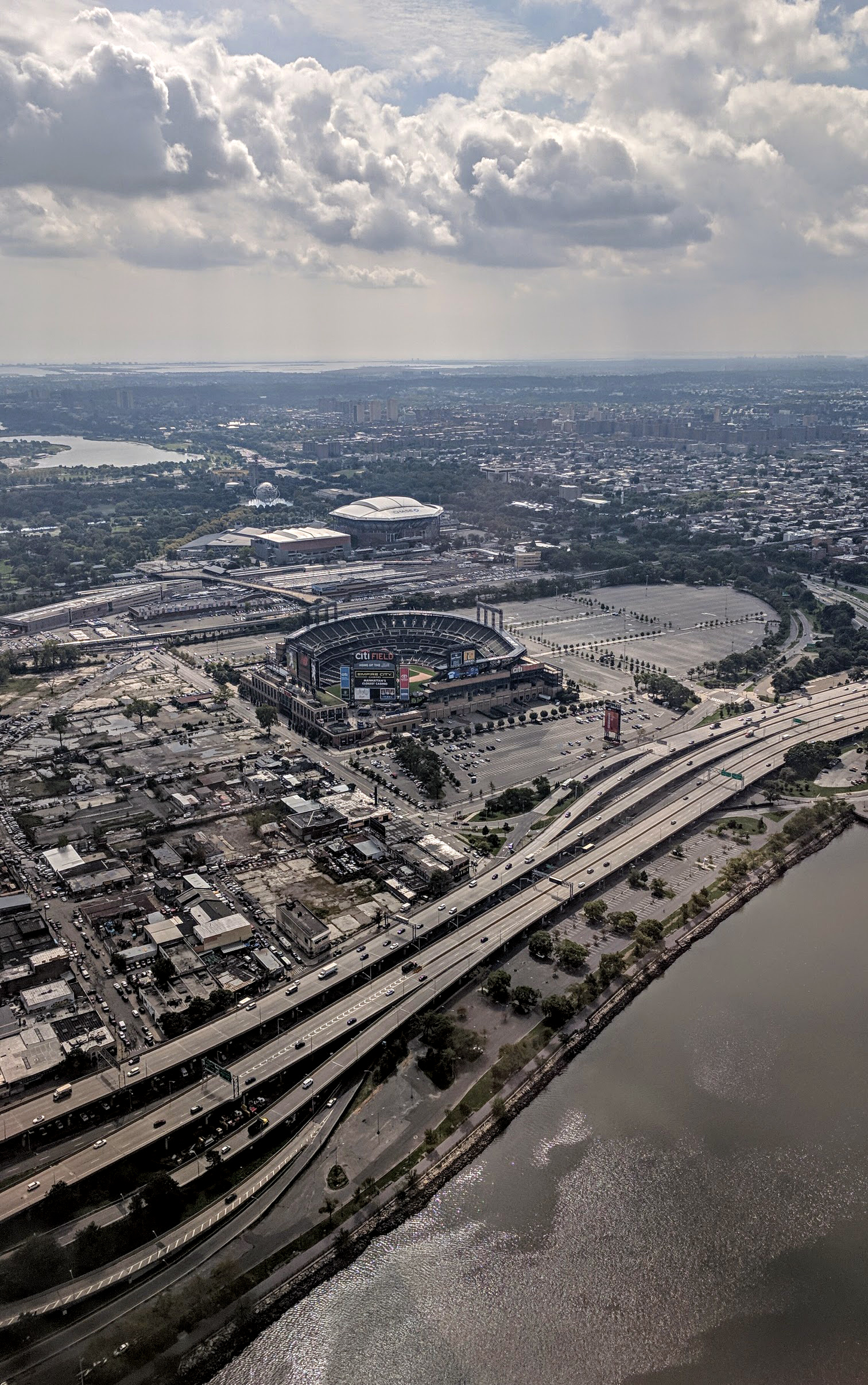
Aerial view from the north of Citi Field in 2018, with the covered Arthur Ashe Stadium behind it, on takeoff from LaGuardia Airport

=== Notable baseball games ===
- April 13, 2009 – In the first Mets game ever played at Citi Field, Jody Gerut of the San Diego Padres hit a home run off Mike Pelfrey as the first batter of the game, becoming the first player in Major League Baseball history to open a ballpark with a leadoff home run.
- April 17, 2009 – Gary Sheffield hit his 500th home run against the Milwaukee Brewers, becoming the first player to reach this milestone as a pinch hitter. It was Sheffield's first home run as a Met, which made Sheffield the first player to hit number 500 as his first home run with a new team.
- June 28, 2009 – Mariano Rivera of the New York Yankees recorded his 500th career save, becoming only the second relief pitcher to reach this milestone. The Mets gave Rivera the pitching rubber from Citi Field used in the game in honor of his achievement. (Rivera's only RBI, on a bases-loaded walk, also occurred in the game.)
- August 23, 2009 - Philadelphia Phillies second baseman Eric Bruntlett executed an unassisted triple play to finish off a 9–7 win over the Mets. This is just the second game-ending unassisted triple play in Major League Baseball history.
- September 11, 2011 – Citi Field hosted a nationally televised game against the Chicago Cubs to mark the tenth anniversary of the attacks of that day in 2001. The pregame ceremonies featured members of the 2001 team who played at Shea Stadium on September 21, 2001, the first major sporting event held in New York City since the attacks.
- June 1, 2012 – Johan Santana threw the first no-hitter in Mets franchise history in an 8–0 victory over the St. Louis Cardinals.
- July 16, 2013 – Citi Field hosted the 2013 Major League Baseball All-Star Game, with the American League defeating the National League 3–0. The attendance of 45,186 was the largest in Citi Field's history.
- June 9, 2015 – Chris Heston of the San Francisco Giants threw a no-hitter in a 5–0 victory over the Mets.
- October 3, 2015 – Max Scherzer of the Washington Nationals threw a no-hitter in a 2–0 victory over the Mets, becoming the fifth pitcher in major league history to throw two no hitters in a season.
- October 12, 2015 – Citi Field hosted its first playoff game, with the Mets defeating the Los Angeles Dodgers 13–7 in Game 3 of the 2015 NLDS.
- October 30, 2015 – Citi Field hosted its first World Series game, with the Mets defeating the Kansas City Royals 9–3 in Game 3 of the 2015 World Series.
- November 1, 2015 – The Kansas City Royals won the 2015 World Series, their first World Series championship since the 1985 World Series with a 7–2 Game 5 victory over the Mets in 12 innings.
- July 30, 2016 - In a pre-game ceremony before a 7–2 loss to the Colorado Rockies, Mike Piazza's #31 was retired, only the second time in club history that the Mets retired a player's number.
- October 5, 2016 - The San Francisco Giants defeated the Mets 3–0 in the 2016 National League Wild Card Game.
- September 11–13, 2017 - A three-game series between the New York Yankees and Tampa Bay Rays was moved from Tropicana Field to Citi Field due to Hurricane Irma. The Rays were the "home" team for this series because the games were supposed to be played in Tropicana Field. These were the first Major League Baseball games to be played at Citi Field that did not involve the New York Mets. Additionally, these were the first games played in Flushing under AL rules (excluding the 2013 All-Star Game) since April 1998, when the Yankees played a "home" game at Shea Stadium, after a beam caused structural damage at the original Yankee Stadium, and during the 1974 and 1975 seasons, while Yankee Stadium was being renovated. The Yankees took two out of three games from the Rays.
- September 28, 2019 - Mets rookie first baseman Pete Alonso broke the record for most home runs in a season by a rookie set by Aaron Judge in 2017.
- September 23, 2020 - The Tampa Bay Rays clinched the American League East with an 8–5 win over the Mets.
- June 25, 2021 - In a 2–1 loss to the Mets, Aaron Nola of the Philadelphia Phillies struck out 10 Mets batters in a row, tying Tom Seaver's record set in 1970.
- August 28, 2021 - In a pre-game ceremony before a 5–3 win over the Washington Nationals, Jerry Koosman's #36 was retired, only the third time in club history that the Mets retired a player's number.
- September 11, 2021 - In a pre-game ceremony before an 8–7 loss to the Yankees, the Mets and Yankees remembered the September 11 attacks on the 20th anniversary of the attacks. The Mets and rival Yankees lined up on the foul lines together for the national anthem and a moment of silence for the victims of the attacks. Both teams wore NYPD and FDNY hats, and the game was nationally televised on Fox.
- April 29, 2022 - Five Mets pitchers combined to throw the second no-hitter (and first combined no-hitter) in Mets franchise history in a 3–0 Mets victory over the Philadelphia Phillies.
- November 10–12, 2023 - Two teams from the Dominican Republic Professional Baseball League (LIDOM), the Águilas Cibaeñas from Santiago and the Tigres del Licey from Santo Domingo, played three exhibition games in Citi Field, making it the first time that a LIDOM game was played outside of the Dominican Republic. Billed as the "Titans of the Caribbean" series, the Águilas swept the inaugural season in three games. With a total audience of 90,900 from the three games, it also became one of the highest attended LIDOM matches ever recorded.
- October 9, 2024 - The Mets defeated the Philadelphia Phillies 4–1 in Game 4 of the 2024 National League Division Series, marking the first time the Mets clinched a playoff series at Citi Field.

=== Soccer matches ===
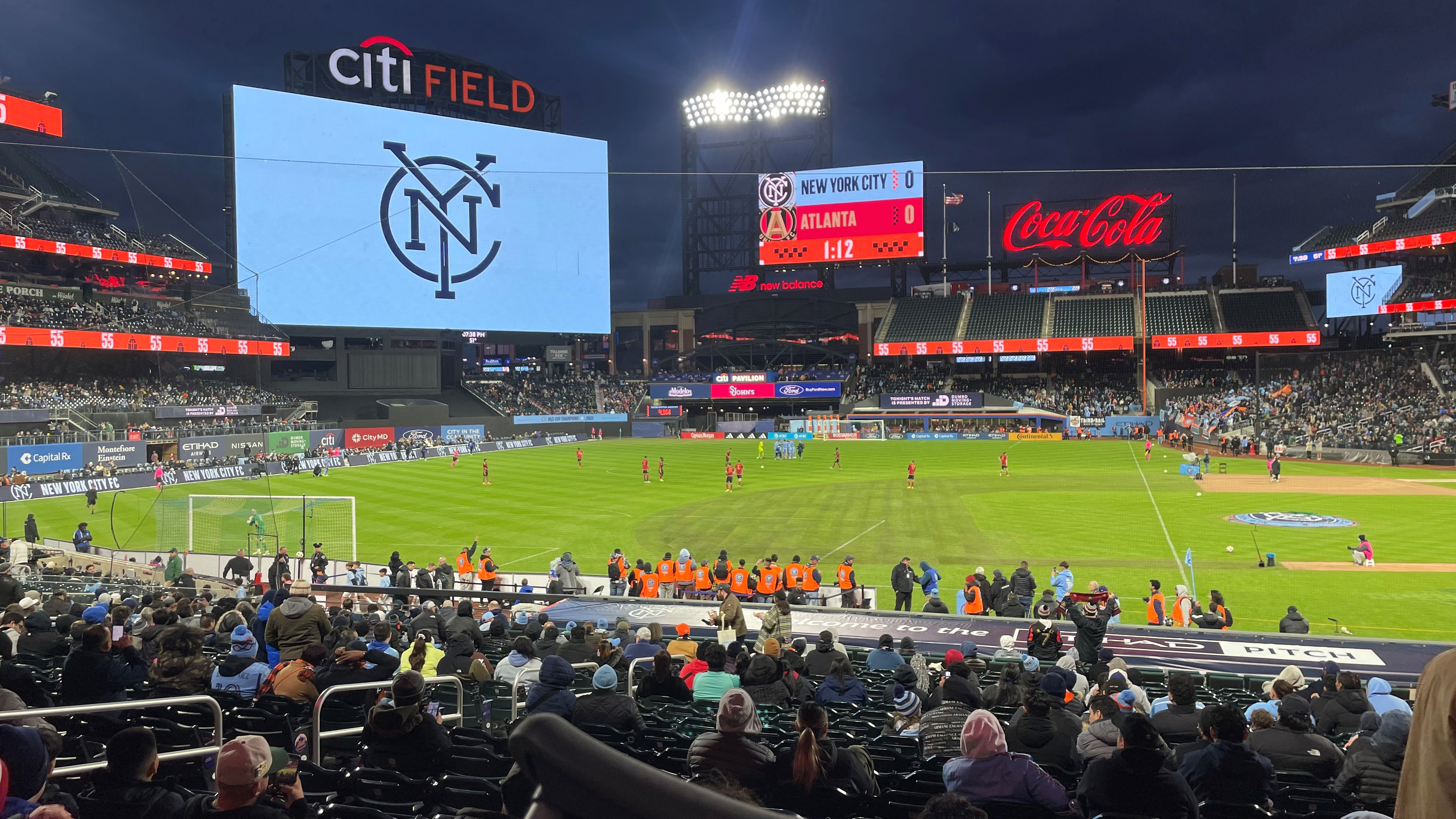
Citi Field before a New York City FC match

Citi Field has hosted international soccer friendlies since shortly after it opened. It was a host venue for the 2011 World Football Challenge.

New York City FC played Major League Soccer matches at Citi Field in 2017 and 2019, when conflicts with the Yankees' schedule caused their regular home Yankee Stadium to be unavailable. Beginning with the 2022 season, NYCFC has used Citi Field as a part-time home field, hosting nearly half their home matches. The club is constructing a soccer-specific stadium across the street named Etihad Park, which broke ground in 2024 and is slated to open in 2027. The final New York City FC game at Citi Field is expected to be in 2027.

Citi Field hosted the first women's soccer game in its history on July 15, 2026. Gotham FC against Washington Spirit during the National Women's Soccer League regular season. Gotham won 1–0 in front of 42,175 fans.

Date	Winning Team	Result	Losing Team	Tournament	Spectators	Ref.
June 7, 2011	Ecuador	1–1	Greece	Friendly	39,656	
July 26, 2011	(Italy) Juventus	1–0	(Mexico) Club América	World Football Challenge	20,859	
August 15, 2012	Ecuador	3–0	Chile	Friendly	31,901	
June 2, 2013	Israel	2–0	Honduras	Friendly	26,170	
October 22, 2017	(United States) New York City FC	2–2	(United States) Columbus Crew	Major League Soccer	20,113	
October 23, 2019	(Canada) Toronto FC	2–1	(United States) New York City FC	Major League Soccer playoffs	19,829	
April 24, 2022	(United States) New York City FC	5–4	(Canada) Toronto FC	Major League Soccer	17,626	
May 7, 2022	(United States) New York City FC	0–0	(United States) Sporting Kansas City	Major League Soccer	15,031	
May 22, 2022	(United States) New York City FC	1–0	(United States) Chicago Fire FC	Major League Soccer	18,823	
September 7, 2022	(United States) New York City FC	1–1	(United States) FC Cincinnati	Major League Soccer	14,248	
October 17, 2022	(United States) New York City FC	3–0	(United States) Inter Miami	Major League Soccer playoffs	18,066	
April 15, 2023	(United States) New York City FC	2–1	(United States) Nashville SC	Major League Soccer	18,687	
April 22, 2023	(United States) New York City FC	3–1	(United States) FC Dallas	Major League Soccer	20,922	
May 27, 2023	(United States) Philadelphia Union	3–1	(United States) New York City FC	Major League Soccer	22,830	
July 5, 2023	(United States) New York City FC	1–1	(United States) Charlotte FC	Major League Soccer	15,122	
July 23, 2023	(Mexico) Club Atlas	1–0	(United States) New York City FC	2023 Leagues Cup	22,267	
August 20, 2023	(United States) Minnesota United FC	2–0	(United States) New York City FC	Major League Soccer	18,606	
September 20, 2023	(United States) New York City FC	2–0	(United States) Orlando City SC	Major League Soccer	15,238	
October 21, 2023	(United States) New York City FC	1–0	(United States) Chicago Fire FC	Major League Soccer	23,260	
April 6, 2024	(United States) New York City FC	1–1	(United States) Atlanta United FC	Major League Soccer	21,497	
April 20, 2024	(United States) New York City FC	2–0	(United States) D.C. United	Major League Soccer	21,073	
May 5, 2024	(United States) Colorado Rapids	2–0	(United States) New York City FC	Major League Soccer	19,456	
May 18, 2024	(United States) New York City FC	2–1	(United States) New York Red Bulls	Major League Soccer	30,731	
July 3, 2024	(United States) New York City FC	2–0	(Canada) CF Montréal	Major League Soccer	18,209	
August 24, 2024	(United States) New York City FC	2–2	(United States) Chicago Fire FC	Major League Soccer	24,428	
November 2, 2024	(United States) New York City FC	3–1	(United States) FC Cincinnati	Major League Soccer playoffs	19,585	
November 23, 2024	(United States) New York Red Bulls	2–0	(United States) New York City FC	Major League Soccer playoffs	24,891	
April 12, 2025	(United States) New York City FC	1–0	(United States) Philadelphia Union	Major League Soccer	19,897	
May 4, 2025	(United States) New York City FC	1–0	(United States) FC Cincinnati	Major League Soccer	21,611	
May 17, 2025	(United States) New York City FC	2–0	(United States) New York Red Bulls	Major League Soccer	30,804	
September 24, 2025	(United States) Inter Miami	4–0	(United States) New York City FC	Major League Soccer	40,845	
October 18, 2025	(United States) Seattle Sounders FC	2–1	(United States) New York City FC	Major League Soccer	24,832	
November 18, 2025	Colombia	3–0	Australia	Friendly	42,000	
April 4, 2026	(United States) New York City FC	1–1	(United States) St. Louis City SC	Major League Soccer	20,867	
April 18, 2026	(United States) Charlotte FC	2–1	(United States) New York City FC	Major League Soccer	20,997	
May 3, 2026	(United States) D.C. United	2–0	(United States) New York City FC	Major League Soccer	14,040	
July 15, 2026	(United States) Gotham FC	1–0	(United States) Washington Spirit	National Women's Soccer League	42,175	
September 9, 2026	(United States) New York City FC	–	(United States) New England Revolution	Major League Soccer		
November 4, 2026	(United States) New York City FC	–	(United States) Los Angeles FC	Major League Soccer		

=== Other sports events ===
- The inaugural Metropolitan Lacrosse Classic was played at Citi Field on March 17, 2013, only the second time a Major League Baseball stadium has staged college lacrosse, according to the Mets. In 1971, Navy played Johns Hopkins at the Houston Astrodome. Holy Cross played Navy at noon, followed by Colgate and Michigan at 3 p.m. Holy Cross defeated Navy 7–5 and Colgate defeated Michigan 10–7, before a crowd of 15,656.
- On June 7, 2015, the first "Legends of Wrestling" event took place at Citi Field. It was a professional wrestling event, featuring veteran wrestlers such as Rob Van Dam, Lita, The Nasty Boys, Scott Steiner, and many more independent professional wrestlers, in up to six matches taking place; the event was headlined by Ric Flair, Bret "The Hitman" Hart, and Bill Goldberg.
- On November 7, 2015, Citi Field hosted the first game of the Cricket All-Stars Series 2015, featuring many retired cricket players from around the world and led by great cricket legends Sachin Tendulkar and Shane Warne. Warne's Warriors defeated Sachin's Blasters by 6 wickets.
- On January 1, 2018, Citi Field hosted the 10th edition of the NHL Winter Classic between the New York Rangers and the Buffalo Sabres. The Rangers won the game in overtime, 3–2. Paul Carey, Michael Grabner, and J.T. Miller scored for the Rangers, while Sam Reinhart, and Rasmus Ristolainen scored for the Sabres. The Sabres were the designated home team for the game, as the Rangers' home arena of Madison Square Garden would lose its property tax exemption from the City of New York if any Rangers home games are not played there.
- On November 16, 2019, Citi Field hosted the New York Hurling Classic—a one-day hurling tournament featuring Limerick, Kilkenny, Tipperary, and Wexford for the Players Champions Cup—which was won by Kilkenny.

=== Concerts ===
- July 17, 18 and 21, 2009 - Paul McCartney played the first concert ever held at Citi Field. McCartney was part of a historic concert at Shea in 1965 as one of The Beatles, and had also been a guest at Billy Joel's farewell event for the stadium. The performances, for which 180,000 tickets sold out within hours of the announcement (and also had Joel as a guest), were recorded on the live album Good Evening New York City.
- July 16 and 17, 2010 - Dave Matthews Band played two sold out nights at Citi Field with opening guests Zac Brown Band. The show on July 17 was released as live album Live in New York City.
- June 7–8, 2016 - American singer-songwriter and actress Beyoncé sold out two nights at Citi Field on The Formation World Tour. The two shows grossed $11,461,340 and had a combined attendance of 73,486.
- July 29–30, 2017 - the two-day Classic East event, put on by music mogul Irving Azoff. The first night featured The Doobie Brothers, Steely Dan and The Eagles. The second night featured Earth, Wind & Fire, Journey and Fleetwood Mac. This concert would mark Lindsey Buckingham’s last full concert as a member of Fleetwood Mac; he would be fired from the band six months later after a dispute.
- August 28–29, 2017 - American singer-songwriter and actress Lady Gaga sold out two nights at Citi Field on her Joanne World Tour. The two shows grossed $9,520,390 and had an attendance of 69,978 fans.
- October 6, 2018 - South Korean Boy Band BTS performed at Citi Field during their Love Yourself World Tour in 2018, being the first South Korean act to ever sell out a stadium in the United States.
- June 23, 2019 - Dead & Company performed at the stadium for their Summer Tour 2019.
- October 12–13, 2019, October 28–30, 2021 & September 23–25, 2022 - Large hip-hop music festival Rolling Loud was held at the stadium. 2019 headliners included Travis Scott, Meek Mill, Wu-Tang Clan, A$AP Rocky, and Lil Uzi Vert. 2021 headliners included 50 Cent, J. Cole, and Travis Scott. 2022 performers included A$AP Rocky, Future, Nicki Minaj and Ice Spice.
- August 4, 2021 - Green Day and Weezer continued their Hella Mega Tour to a sold-out crowd. Fall Out Boy was scheduled to co-headline, but cancelled their appearance day-of-show due to a positive COVID-19 test within their camp.
- June 24, 2022 - Def Leppard and Mötley Crüe performed to a sold-out crowd at Citi Field during The Stadium Tour, with Poison and Joan Jett and the Blackhearts as special guests.
- September 24–26, 2021 & June 10–12, 2022 - The Governors Ball Music Festival was held at the stadium. Some of the 2021 headliners included Billie Eilish, A$AP Rocky, J Balvin, and Post Malone. 2022 headliners included Kid Cudi, Halsey, and J. Cole.
- On June 9, 2023, American singer-songwriter Romeo Santos became the first Spanish-language, Latin music act to sell out Citi Field. Santos is also the first bachata artist to perform at Citi Field. The concert was part of his Formula, Vol. 3 Tour, which also saw Santos perform at several other large-capacity stadiums across the country.
- On August 3, 2023, American singer-songwriter Pink performed at the stadium as part of her Summer Carnival tour, breaking the attendance record with an estimated audience of 43,700.
- On July 17 and 19, 2024, the Foo Fighters performed at the stadium as part of their Everything or Nothing at All Tour. The band's July 17 performance ended prematurely halfway through due to a lightning storm in the area.
- On July 21, 2024. pop-punk band Blink-182 performed at the stadium, as part of their One More Time Tour, with support from Pierce the Veil and Ekkstacy as support acts.
- On August 3, 2024, K-pop boy group Ateez performed at the stadium as part of their North American Towards the Light : Will to Power 2024 Tour.
- On August 5, 2024, rock band Green Day performed at the stadium as part of their North American leg of The Saviors Tour. The band performed their classic albums Dookie and American Idiot.
- On August 7, 2024, Def Leppard and Journey performed at the stadium as part of the Summer Stadium Tour with the Steve Miller Band as the opener.
- On June 18 and 19, 2025, Stray Kids performed at the stadium as part of their North American leg of Dominate World Tour.
- On July 26 and 27, 2025, Blackpink performed at the stadium as part of their Deadline World Tour.
- Noah Kahan scheduled two dates at the stadium on July 18 and 19, 2026, at part of his The Great Divide Tour, but the first was cancelled due to heavy rain and severe thunderstorms.

=== Mets Concert Series post-game concerts (2012–2016) ===
Between 2012 and 2016, the Mets had a post-game concert series entitled "Mets Concert Series" after selected games. Unlike the concerts where the performance was the sole attraction of the evening, "Mets Concert Series" events were considered promotional dates, and admission to the concert was included in the price of the game ticket. The stage was set up in shallow center field.

=== COVID-19 pandemic ===
On January 12, 2021, the Mets and the Mayor Bill De Blasio announced that Citi Field would become a mass vaccination center during the COVID-19 pandemic beginning on January 25. Originally located in the Delta Club, the location was later moved to the former site of McFadden's. Run by the city's public hospital system, the site administered over 200,000 vaccinations.

== See also ==
- Shea Stadium, the home of the Mets from 1964 to 2008
- Yankee Stadium, a baseball stadium in The Bronx for the New York Yankees, which opened in April 2009
- Madison Square Garden IV, an arena in Manhattan for the New York Knicks and New York Rangers, which opened in February 1968
- Prudential Center, an arena in Newark, New Jersey for the New Jersey Devils, which opened in October 2007
- Barclays Center, an arena in Brooklyn for the Brooklyn Nets and New York Liberty, which opened in September 2012
- MetLife Stadium, a football stadium in East Rutherford, New Jersey for the New York Giants and New York Jets, which opened in April 2010
- Sports Illustrated Stadium, a soccer stadium in Harrison, New Jersey for the New York Red Bulls, which opened in March 2010
- UBS Arena, an arena in Elmont, New York for the New York Islanders, which opened in November 2021
- Etihad Park, a soccer stadium under construction across the street from Citi Field for New York City FC and Gotham FC, which plans to open in 2027
- Hard Rock Hotel & Casino Metropolitan Park, a proposed casino hotel which would be built adjacent to CitiField
- Metropolitan Park (Queens), a proposed park which would be built alongside CitiField

Preceded by Shea Stadium	Home of the New York Mets; 2009 – present	Succeeded by current
Preceded by Kaufmann Stadium	Host of the Major League Baseball All-Star Game; 2013	Succeeded by Target Field
Preceded by Busch Stadium	Host of the NHL Winter Classic; 2018	Succeeded by Notre Dame Stadium
