= Bengt Sjostrom Theatre =

Coordinates: 37.0625°N 95.677°W

Bengt Sjostrom Theatre (Starlight Theatre)
- Starlight Theatre
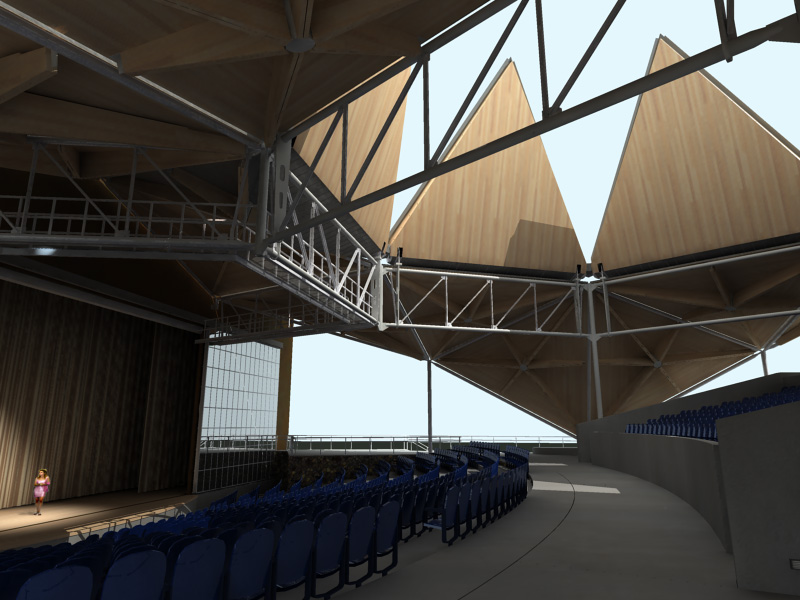
- Interactive map of Bengt Sjostrom Theatre (Starlight Theatre)
- Location: Rockford, Illinois
- Owner: Rock Valley College
- Capacity: 1,041
- Public transit: RMTD

Construction
- Opened: 1966
- Architect: Studio Gang Architects
- Builders: Sjostrom & Sons, Inc.

The Bengt Sjostrom Theatre (usually referred to as Starlight Theatre by local residents) is an outdoor community theater located on the Rock Valley College campus in Rockford, Illinois. It houses the Rock Valley College Starlight Theatre, one of two theatres operated by the college (the other being the indoor Rock Valley College Studio Theatre).

The Bengt Sjostrom Theatre was constructed in 1983 and is dedicated to the memory of Bengt Sjostrom, builder and civic leader, who was the general contractor when the college buildings were constructed, from 1967 to 1971. Mr. Sjostrom was president and chairman of the board of Sjostrom & Sons, Inc., the construction firm started by his father in 1914.

Construction began on the facility, previously named the Community Arts Center, in 1974, when a group of citizens met to discuss building a permanent structure to house Starlight Theatre, a summer theater program in Rockford. By 1976, a stage, orchestra pit and rough graded seating area were built, supported entirely with private monies.

It was not until former Rock Valley College Foundation Director Charles Blake committed himself to the completion of the current phase that construction began. Through his initiative, Sjostrom & Sons, Inc. built the facility entirely as a donation in memory of Bengt Sjostrom, for whom this theater is now named.

Rock Valley College began remodeling the Bengt Sjostrom Starlight Theatre in 2001 with Studio Gang O'Donnell, now known as Studio Gang Architects. The design of the 135,000 sf theatre renovation maintains the tradition of open–air performances at Rock Valley College while allowing the theatre company to extend its season in any weather.

Phase 1 renovations included a wide variety of amenities and improvements such as easier accessibility; increased seating capacity to 1,100 (previously 600); on-site rest room facilities; on-site box office for both ticket purchase and pickup; and on-site concession stands and state-of-the-art theatrical technology. Phase 2 renovations, completed in the 2002 season, featured the construction of a 150-foot (46 m) proscenium stage house which included improvements such as: a fully functional fly system, larger stage platform, a completely protected stage, and a stage house that provides an acoustical barrier from other area events. The crowning achievement of the Bengt Sjostrom Theatre renovation was completed in June 2003—a motorized retractable roof.

Technologies typically employed to move roofs over massive stadiums were adapted by Studio Gang Architects and Minneapolis-based engineering firm Uni-Systems. The roof comprises six 36-foot-wide (11 m), 42-foot-long (13 m) triangle-shaped panels weighing a total of 86 tons. The roof can open to give the audience a star-shaped view of the sky, or it can be closed to fully shelter the audience, a problem noted in the theater's past.
