= Rock Valley College =

Two-year college in Rockford, Illinois, US

- Type: Public community college
- Established: 1964
- Parent institution: Illinois Community College System
- President: Howard Spearman
- Undergraduates: 5,762 (spring 2022)
- Location: Rockford, Illinois, United States; 42.307°N 88.994°W
- Campus: Rural, 217 acres (0.88 km^{2})
- Colors: Navy Blue and Gold
- Nickname: Golden Eagles
- Sporting affiliations: NJCAA Division II – N4C
- Mascot: Arvee the Golden Eagle
- Website: www.rockvalleycollege.edu

Rock Valley College (RVC) is a public community college in Rockford, Illinois. It was founded in 1964 and is part of the Illinois Community College System. RVC's district comprises Winnebago County, Boone County, and parts of Stephenson County, Ogle County, McHenry County, and DeKalb County. Since opening for classes in 1965, RVC has grown to an institution of 140 faculty members, 500 part-time lecturers, and more than 7700 students.

== History ==
Rock Valley College was founded in 1964 to allow students from the region in and around Rockford Public School District No. 205 the opportunity to receive post-secondary education similar to university curriculum. RVC's district comprises all of Winnebago and Boone County and parts of Stephenson, Ogle, McHenry and DeKalb counties. Authorized by the Illinois General Assembly and signed by Illinois Governor Otto Kerner, Jr. in 1961, legislation was enacted that created the Illinois Board of Higher Education (IBHE). The IBHE was tasked by statute with formulating a Master Plan for Higher Education in the state of Illinois. In July 1964 the higher education master plan was published by the IBHE, which led to the Junior College Act of 1965. Soon thereafter, a district-wide referendum was approved that authorized the founding of RVC. It received accreditation via the Higher Learning Commission of the North Central Association of Colleges and Schools in 1971.

In April 1965, Clifford G. Erickson was chosen by the first Board of Trustees to be the first President of Rock Valley College, and classes began on September 29, 1965, for 1,054 students. However, the main campus was not ready for classes. Instead, during the first year, classes were held in various locations throughout Rockford, including Harlem High School, the Rockford YWCA, the National Guard Armory, and the Naval Reserve Armory. By Fall 1966, classes moved to three small wooden buildings at the current main campus location . The buildings, referred to as "temp building" on campus, remained active in a variety of capacities for 37 years. In October 1967, the groundbreaking for six permanent buildings occurred. It took five years to complete Classrooms I and II, a Boiler House, Educational Resource Center (ERC), Student Center (SC) and the Physical Education Center (PEC). In 1968 the college began an aviation maintenance program at the Rockford Airport (now the Chicago Rockford International Airport) and an automotive service tech program in the neighboring town of Belvidere. Both programs are still active.

In January 1969, Karl Jacobs became the second RVC President. During his 28-year tenure, the college expanded both programs and locations. In 1970, the American Dental Association's Council of Education approved the RVC Dental Assisting Program. The next year, the college took over the Adult and Continuing Education program from the Rockford School District, offering personal enrichment and professional development classes to the public. A Tool and Die Apprenticeship program was added in 1974. In 1978, the college began offering college credit to high school students taking classes through the High School Connections program. In 1981 the college purchased an unused school building, Bell School, which is used for many of the community education classes. Dr. Jacobs also spearheaded the building of the Technology Center (now Woodward Tech Center or WTC) and the implementation of numerous technology programs. The Tech Center opened in 1987, helping with a cooperative education agreement reached the previous year with Chrysler Motor Corporation that allowed workers to take technology courses that went toward job training for the Belvidere plant as well as college credit. It also became the first testing location for robotics classroom software developed by the University of Michigan.

Upon Jacobs' retirement, Roland Chapdelaine became the college's third president in 1997. He continued expansion of the college and its facilities. Under his leadership, the Student Center was remodeled, the Support Services Building (SSB) was built, and the state of the art Bengt Sjostrom Theatre with its retractable roof was unveiled.

Cheap Trick's Rick Nielsen, Illinois Senator Dave Syverson, Larry Young, author Kimberla Lawson Roby, illustrator Tom Lichtenheld, and chancellor Susan Sciame-Giesecke, are members of the college alumni.

== Campus ==
Rock Valley College is located on a 217-acre (0.88 km^{2}) tract of land at N. Mulford and Spring Brook roads in northeast Rockford. In addition to the main campus, RVC operates programs at owned facilities at the Stenstrom Center for Career Education on Samuelson Road, home to several health and technical programs, the Aviation Center at the Chicago Rockford International Airport in Rockford, and the Bell School Road Center, which houses the college's Center for Learning in Retirement.

Rock Valley College holds continuing education classes at more than 50 sites throughout its district, and operates employment and training programs at the Illinois Employment Training Center at 303 North Main Street in Rockford.

== Academics and demographics ==
Rock Valley College is accredited by the Higher Learning Commission (HLC) to offer certificates, diplomas and associate degrees. It received initial accreditation in 1971 after applying for accreditation candidacy in 1967.

Rock Valley College partners with area four-year colleges and universities, such as Northern Illinois University, University of Illinois Springfield, and Western Illinois University as a part of the Illinois Articulation Initiative (IAI), a statewide transfer agreement which ensures general education credits are transferable among more than 100 participating college or universities in Illinois. There are two primary educational tracks at RVC: Transfer Programs, and Career Educational Programs. The tracks offer a total of 33 associate degree programs, and 34 certificate programs to students of RVC.

=== Enrollment ===
As of April 13, 2009, for-credit Spring enrollment at RVC was 8,072, of which 3,569 were enrolled full-time, and 4,503 were enrolled part-time. In addition, 7,853 non-credit enrollees were reported by RVC for the same period. Dual credit students, who are obtaining college credit while attending high school accounted for 536 students of total enrollment. Overall student head count at the college rose 8 percent from 2008 school year. Most of the increase in enrollment was attributed to new freshmen beginning at community colleges, as well as the introduction of new programs at the college.

=== Libraries ===
Rock Valley College provides a library at its main Rockford, Illinois Campus. The library has over 100,000 volumes and equivalent online periodical and newspaper databases. It has facilities for study, research, leisure reading, class preparation, and wireless Internet access for students.

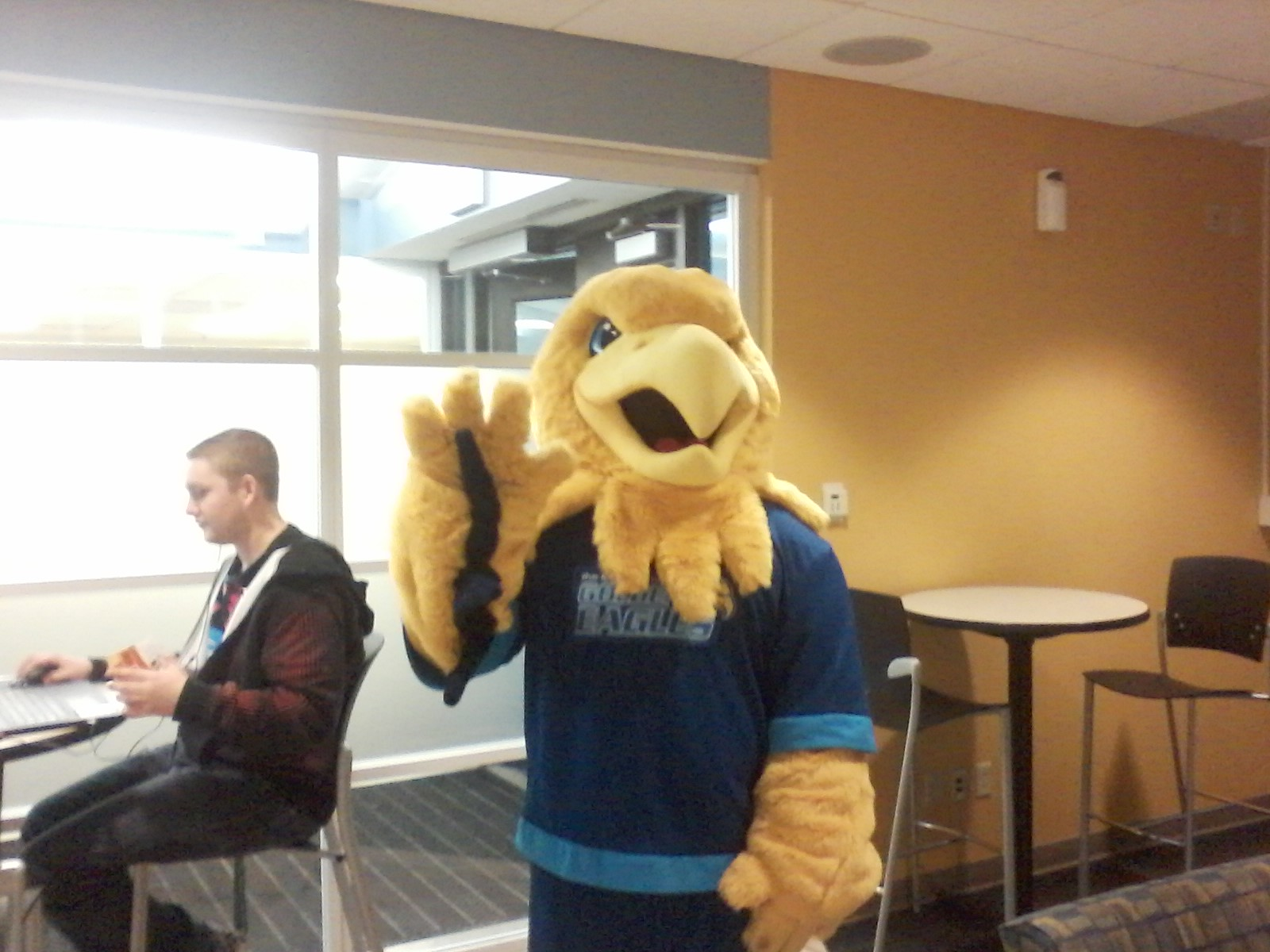
Arvee the Golden Eagle

== Athletics ==
Nine men's and women's intercollegiate sports are offered at RVC. The Golden Eagles compete in NJCAA Division II in volleyball, men's and women's basketball, baseball, softball, men's and women's soccer and men's and women's bowling. RVC has won six NJCAA National Championships in volleyball, golf, and tennis. The 2014 men's basketball team won the NJCAA DIII national tournament in Loch Sheldrake, New York at Sullivan County Community College, the first national championship in the program's 48-year history. RVC was one of only four community colleges to field a football program among the 48-member Illinois Community College System. Due to funding and attendance issues, the RVC Board of Trustees voted to discontinue the football program on April 28, 2009.

== Theatre and arts ==
The college Theatre Department offers year-round opportunities for students and community members through its two theatres: Rock Valley College Starlight Theatre and Rock Valley College Studio Theatre. The Starlight Theatre is housed in the award-winning outdoor Bengt Sjostrom Theatre, which features a movable roof. Studio Theatre was housed in a converted barn on the campus, along with Theatre Department offices and costume storage facilities. Plans to relocate them from "the barn" to a new Arts Instructional Center (AIC) with modern amenities have been tabled by the college's board of trustees.

== Transportation ==
The main campus of Rock Valley College in Rockford is served by the Rockford Mass Transit District. Routes 16, 17, and 36 provide bus service from campus to downtown Rockford and other destinations across the city.

== See also ==
- Illinois Community College System
