= Uni-Systems =

Design, construction, and manufacturing firm

Uni-Systems Manufacturing, LLC
- Company type: Limited liability company
- Founded: 1968
- Headquarters: Minneapolis, Minnesota, USA
- Key people: Derek Olson, Owner/CRO; Peter Fervoy, President
- Products: En-Fold retractable fabric canopy system for large commercial applications; Kinetic Architecture (operable/mechanized architecture)
- Number of employees: 10
- Website: http://www.uni-systems.com

Uni-Systems is a design, construction, and manufacturing firm located in Minneapolis, Minnesota specializing in kinetic architecture, or movable, mechanized structures. Uni-Systems has been involved in the construction of five of the seven sports stadiums incorporating retractable roofs in North America since 1999.

The company was founded in 1968 by Cyril Silberman, CEO, and began extensive work within the aerospace industry including the design and installation of hangar doors, landing gear elevator platforms, empennage stands, and the firm's patented Uni-Dock. Clients of Uni-Systems in the aerospace industry include American Airlines, SkyVenture, Boeing, Canadian Air, the United States Air Force, and El Al Israel Airlines.

In 2014 Cyril Silberman sold the engineering department to Bart Riberich, President of Uni-Systems, LLC, who then created the new company Uni-Systems Engineering. Uni-Systems, LLC continues to serve the kinetic architecture market with the patented En-Fold® retractable fabric canopy product and small custom kinetic building elements.

== Retractable roofs ==
The firm's work with stadiums began with Daikin Park (formerly Enron Field), when they were contracted to work on the stadium's retractable roof with the architectural company Populous (then called HOK Sport). Uni-Systems also designed and installed the Squeeze Play feature, as well as the custom ornamental train that runs along an outfield wall at the stadium.

Along with the design and installation of retractable roofs, Uni-Systems helps develop custom control systems for operating mechanized components. At Reliant Stadium, Uni-Systems worked with General Electric to control the bi-parting stadium roof. The retractable skylight over the 470-ft-long retail concourse of Salt Lake City's City Creek Mall consists of two independent sections, one 230 ft and the other 240 ft long and each 58 ft wide. The retractable motion was achieved through three opposing glass-covered arched panels that cantilever across the 55.5-ft-wide concourse. Each panel has three plate box "ribs" with a 12.5-ft upturned back-span. The 80-ton skylight opens or closes in five minutes. City Creek Mall expects to have the roof open 70% of the time.

== Projects ==
The company is now focused on the sale and manufacture of the En-Fold® retractable fabric canopy system. In the past it has also designed several other mechanized components in sports stadiums, such as the retractable end zone window-walls at Lucas Oil Stadium and Cowboys Stadium. It also designed the movable playing field at the University of Phoenix Stadium and the retractable pitcher's mound at RFK Stadium.

In addition to large scale projects, Uni-Systems has completed several smaller projects ranging from the Bengt Sjostrom Theatre (Starlight Theatre) to numerous En-Fold retractable fabric canopy applications.

Project list

- Soho Beach House - Miami beach, FL (En-Fold® retractable fabric canopy, 2018)
- Merriweather Post Pavilion - Columbia, MD (En-Fold® retractable fabric canopy, 2018) (Winner of the 2018 IFAI IAA Outstanding Achievement Award)
- Private Residence - Chicago, IL (En-Fold® retractable fabric canopy, 2017)
- Kimpton Tryon Park Hotel, Charlotte, NC (En-Fold® retractable fabric canopy, 2017) (Winner of the 2018 IFAI IAA Award of Excellence)
- Chotto Matte - Miami Beach, FL (En-Fold® retractable fabric canopy, 2017) (Winner of the 2018 IFAI IAA Award of Excellence)
- The Setai Miami Beach Pond Courtyard - Miami Beach, FL (En-Fold® retractable fabric canopy, 2016)
- Quinto, la Huella - Miami, FL (En-Fold® retractable fabric canopy, 2016)
- Four Seasons Lanai - Lanai, Hi (En-Fold® retractable fabric canopy, 2016)
- Beer Park - Las Vegas, NV (En-Fold® retractable fabric canopy, 2015)
- The Beach Club - Hallandale, FL (En-Fold® retractable fabric canopy, 2015)
- Radisson Blu Edwardian - Guildford, UK (En-Fold® retractable fabric canopy, 2015) (Winner of the 2015 IFAI IAA Award of Excellence))
- Louie Bossi's - Fort Lauderdale, FL (En-Fold® retractable fabric canopy, 2015)
- Hotel Charleston Santa Teresa - Cartegena, CO, (En-Fold® retractable fabric canopy, 2014)
- Bal Harbour Shops - Bal Harbour, FL (En-Fold® retractable fabric canopy, 2013)
- Andaz Hotel - San Diego, CA (En-Fold® retractable fabric canopy, 2013)
- 444 North Capitol Rooftop Terrace - Washington, DC (En-Fold® retractable fabric canopy, 2012)
- Juvia Restaurant Miami Beach, FL (En-Fold® retractable fabric canopy, 2012) (Winner of the 2012 IFAI IAA Award of Excellence)
- Salt Lake City's City Creek Mall (retractable skylight over the 470-ft-long retail concourse, 2012)
- American Airlines (Uni-Dock [2000 and 2003], landing gear elevator platform)
- Bengt Sjostrom Theatre (retractable roof, 2003)
- Boeing (landing gear elevator platforms [1993], material lift[2006], paint gantry[1997])
- Canadian Air (empennage stands, 1995)
- Cape Canaveral Air Force Station (vertical lift door, 1991)
- Citi Field (New Mets Home run apple, 2009)
- Cowboys Stadium (retractable roof, operable end zone window walls, to be completed summer 2009)
- El Al Airlines (Uni-Dock, 1999)
- Ellsworth Air Force Base (aperture door, 1985)
- Lucas Oil Stadium (retractable roof, operable end zone window walls, to be completed August 2008)
- Miller Park (operable outfield window walls, retrofit roof seals, 2001)
- Minute Maid Park (retractable roof, ornamental train, Squeeze Play, 2000)
- Minnesota Public Radio (retractable in-studio seating, 2006)
- Reliant Stadium (retractable roof, 2002)
- RFK Stadium (retractable pitcher's mound, retrofit adjustable seating, 2005)
- Skyventure Vertical wind tunnel (2005)
- University of Phoenix Stadium (retractable roof, moveable playing field, 2006)
- Wall Street Ferry Terminal (1999)

== Products ==
In addition to large projects, Uni-Systems has also launched an effort in the form of their Modular Mechanization Components (MMC) to bring pre-engineered components to any client – large corporations, small businesses, and even residences. These components were designed to fit the needs of a client with simple modifications to an already-existing design, allowing virtually any client to have kinetic architecture without a lengthy design process. The MMC line started with the 10-inch drive, 24-inch drive and Torque Tube and is currently focused on the En-Fold retractable fabric canopy system:

- En-Fold retractable fabric canopy (Winner of the Industrial Fabrics Foundation (IFF) 2012 Innovation Award)
