= Rock Valley College Studio Theatre =

Former indoor community theatre

Coordinates: 42.30617°N 88.99641°W

- Studio Theatre
- Interactive map of Rock Valley College Studio Theatre
- Location: Rockford, Illinois
- Owner: Rock Valley College
- Capacity: 172
- Public transit: RMTD

Construction
- Opened: 1985

The Rock Valley College Studio Theatre was an indoor community theater located on the Rock Valley College campus in Rockford, Illinois; its operational status has been put on hold indefinitely, a casualty of the Illinois Budget crisis (see: Bruce Rauner#Governor of Illinois). It is often conflated with the Rock Valley College Starlight Theatre, which operates in the nearby Bengt Sjostrom Theatre, an award-winning outdoor complex known as Starlight Theatre by local residents. Confusion exists as both theatres are operated by the RVC Theatre Department and stand in close proximity to one another.

== Theatre History ==
The 172-seat, three-quarter thrust theatre is housed in a converted barn, along with the RVC Theatre Department offices and costume storage facilities. The building and its accompanying 217 acres were purchased by the college in 1965 from Dr. J.J. Rogers. The structure has undergone several renovations and served multiple purposes since its initial purchase, at certain times housing the college cafeteria, library and admissions offices. As the campus grew, new buildings were assigned to serve these purposes. By 1985, an unnamed student theatre group had taken up residence in the building. This group would eventually be folded into the existing RVC Theatre Department. Plans to move from "the barn" to a new Arts Instructional Center with modern amenities has been tabled by the college's board of Trustees.

== Production history ==
According to local newspaper records, more than 130 productions have taken place in Studio Theatre.

1985: Ah! Wilderness, Christmas with the Conroys

1986: Ladyhouse Blues, Wings, End of the World, Christmas with the Conroys

1987: Same Time Next Year, Woulda Coulda Shoulda, Prometheus Bound, Hoosier Lore

1988: Two Gentlemen of Verona, Dr. Franken's Consuming Obsession, Death of a 2nd Husband, Christmas with the Conroys

1989: The Tempest, Smile of the Buddha, Your Plays or Mine, Christmas at Wits End

1990: Measure for Measure, Danger: Memory, King Lear, Godspell

1991: Midsummer Nights Dream, Verdict, Richard III, Fantasticks

1992: Wild Oats, Runner Stumbles, Macbeth, Cotton Patch Gospel

1993: Rosencrantz & Guildenstern are Dead, Ten Little Indians, Henry IV Part 1, She Loves Me

1994: Lend Me a Tenor, Witness for the Prosecution, Romeo & Juliet, American Rock

1995: Kites Book, The Hollow, Hamlet, 1940's Radio Hour

1996: Bad Manners, Black Coffee, Winter's Tale, They're Playing Our Song

1997: Star Rover, Towards Zero, Much Ado About Nothing, Nunsense

1998: Three Women Embracing, Spider's Web, Twelfth Night, Dames at Sea

1999: Royal Hunt of the Sun, The Mousetrap, Julius Caesar, Company

2000: Confused in Blimey, Unexpected Guest, As You Like It, King Henry V, Midsummer Nights Dream, Titus Andronicus, Nunsense

2001: The Lake, Murder at the Vicarage, Comedy of Errors, Macbeth, Richard II, The Christmas Schooner

2002: Crossing Bridges, Murder on the Nile, Henry IV, Part II, Taming of the Shrew, Troilus & Cressida, Cabaret

2003: Emily's Shadow, Cards on the Table, Othello, Loves Labours Lost, Into the Woods

2004: Pearl's Jam, Alibi, Merchant of Venice, Timon of Athens, Queen Margaret, Victor/Victoria

2005: Scapino!, Love From a Stranger, Romeo & Juliet (also performed at the Bengt Sjostrom Theatre), The Christmas Schooner

2006: The Mayor of West Belvidere, Appointment with Death, Antony & Cleopatra, All's Well that Ends Well, Lent

2007: You Can't Take it With You, A Murder is Announced, Merry Wives of Windsor, Pericles, Faculty Lounge

2008: Last Easter, A Daughter's A Daughter, King John, Cymbeline, Caroline or Change

2009: American Buffalo, Peril at End House, Hamlet, Coriolanus, Christmas with the Conroys

2010: Cotton Patch Gospel, And Then There Were None, The Tempest, King Henry VIII, Hoosier Lore

2011: Grey Gardens, Go Back for Murder, King Lear, A Christmas Carol

2012: Rocky Horror Show, Murder is Easy, A Midsummer Night's Dream, Rocky Horror Show (Reprise)

2013: Avenue Q, Fiddler's Three, Joseph and the Amazing Technicolor Dreamcoat, The Wizard of Oz

2014: Fiddler on the Roof, Ahknation, A Flea in Her Ear, A Christmas Carol

2015: A Little Night Music, Agatha Christie's Verdict, Witness for the Prosecution, Sunday in the Park with George

2016: Crowns, Much Ado About Nothing

== Original Works Program ==
Since before its official formation, Studio Theatre has performed original plays by local playwrights.

- The Northwest Suburban Penny Ante Poker Club & Suicide League by T. Zack, 1983
- Lazaretti or the Saber-Toothed Tiger by F. Hockwalder, 1984–85
- Christmas with the Conroys by T. Zack, 1985–86
- Woulda, Coulda, Shoulda by M. Swan, 1986–87
- Aeschylus' Prometheus Bound (translated by the cast), 1987–88
- Hoosier Lore by T. Zack, 1987–88
- Dr. Franken's Consuming Obsession by G. Freek, 1987–88
- Death of a Second Husband by R. Cline, 1988–89
- The Smile of the Buddha by G. Freek, 1988–89
- Your Plays or Mine by B. Wine, 1989–90
- Christmas at Wits End by T. Zack, 1989–90
- American Rock by J.E. Murray & R. Pauly, 1994–95
- Kite's Book by R. Caisley, 1994–95
- Bad Manners by R. Caisley, 1994–95
- The Star Rover by M.P. Webb, 1996–97
- Three Women Embracing by R. Caisley, 1997–98
- Confused in Blimey by T. Hunter, 1999–2000
- World Premiere of The Lake by R. Caisley, 2000–01
- Crossing Bridges by C. Blatcher-Martin, 2001–02
- Emily's Shadow by G. Quirk, 2002–03
- Pearl's Jam by Tom Hunter, 2003–04
- Shakespeare's Queen Margaret (adapted by R. Potter - Midwest Premiere), 2004–05
- The Mayor of West Belvidere by T. Hunter, 2005–06
