= Rock Valley College Starlight Theatre =

Coordinates: 37.0625°N 95.677°W

Starlight Theatre is an outdoor theatre operated by Rock Valley College in Rockford, Illinois. Performances are held in the outdoor Bengt Sjostrom Theatre. Operations of Rock Valley College Studio Theatre, an indoor black box theatre, were suspended in 2016. Starlight Theatre also has an award-winning structure designed by Jeanne Gang and Studio Gang Architects that features a unique, one-of-a-kind movable roof, which was added in 2003. Starlight Theatre has transformed itself into a popular destination for the Northern Illinois region. The theatre is situated on 217 acres that were purchased by the college in 1965 from Dr. J.J. Rogers.

== History ==
In the fall of 1966, a group of Rock Valley College students approached Rueben Johnson, the acting Dean of Community Services, with the idea of creating a theatre program. Their aim was to foster public appreciation for the college's scenic farm setting. The following year, they staged an outdoor musical near the farm pond, which had been purchased in 1965 from Dr. J.J. Rogers. They chose to perform "Finian’s Rainbow," a production that addresses overcoming racial barriers through hard work and a touch of magic. Community members enjoyed this inaugural performance from lawn chairs. Since its inception in 1967, Starlight Theatre has produced a total of 191 productions.

List of Main Stage Performances and Directors

1967: Finian's Rainbow (Dir. David Meisenholder)

1968: Patience & Waiting for Godot (Dir. Donald Colucci)

1969: Oklahoma! (Dir. John Pearce)

1970: Man of La Mancha (Dir. Ted Bacino)

1971: Oliver! & Fiddler on the Roof (Dir. Ted Bacino)

1972: 1776 & The King & I (Dir. Ted Bacino)

1973: My Fair Lady & Promises, Promises (Dir. Ted Bacino)

1974: How to Succeed in Business Without Really Trying & No, No, Nanette (Dir. Ted Bacino)

1975: Godspell & Jesus Christ Superstar (Dir. Ted Bacino)

1976: Of Thee I Sing, A Little Night Music (Dir. Kirk Denmark), & Once Upon a Mattress (Dir. Jim Smith)

1977: The Sound of Music & The Music Man (Dir. Jim Crow)

1978: Camelot & Show Boat (Dir. Jim Crow)

1979: West Side Story & Hello, Dolly! (Dir. Jim Crow)

1980: Carnival & Funny Girl (Dir. Jim Crow)

1981: The Wizard of Oz & H.M.S. Pinafore (Dir. A. Neil Thackaberry)

1982: Grease (Dir. Dominic Messimi), Jacques Brel, & South Pacific (Dir. A. Neil Thackaberry)

1983: Man of La Mancha (Dir Dominic Messimi), The Pirates of Penzance, & Guys & Dolls (Dir. A. Neil Thackaberry)

1984: Carousel, My Fair Lady (Dir. A. Neil Thackaberry), & George M! (Dir. Victoria Bussert)

1985: Cabaret (Dir. Rod & Ginny MacDonald), Oklahoma! (Dir. Thom Sobota), & Evita (Dir. Michael P. Webb)

1986: Barnum (Dir. Michael P. Webb), The Music Man (Dir. Leslie Robbins), & Fiddler on the Roof (Dir. Michael P. Webb)

1987: Peter Pan, 1776, & Candide (Dir. Michael P. Webb)

1988: Camelot, Annie Get Your Gun, & 42nd Street (Dir. Michael P. Webb)

1989: Oliver!, Jesus Christ Superstar, & Anything Goes (Dir. Michael P. Webb)

1990: The King & I, The Student Prince, & My One and Only (Dir. Michael P. Webb)

1991: West Side Story, Shenandoah, & A Chorus Line (Dir. Michael P. Webb)

1992: Hello Dolly, Big River, & Into the Woods (Dir. Michael P. Webb)

1993: Kiss Me Kate, Rags, & City of Angels (Dir. Michael P. Webb)

1994: Meet Me in St. Louis, My Fair Lady, & Evita (Dir. Michael P. Webb)

1995: Seven Brides for Seven Brothers, The New Pirates of Penzance, & Joseph and the Amazing Technicolor Dreamcoat (Dir. Michael P. Webb)

1996: Bye Bye Birdie, Pippin, Crazy For You, & Joseph and the Amazing Technicolor Dreamcoat (Dir. Michael P. Webb)

1997: Guys & Dolls, Children of Eden, & The Sound of Music (Dir. Michael P. Webb)

1998: The Secret Garden, Cinderella, & Western Star (Dir. Michael P. Webb)

1999: Annie, Once on this Island, & Fiddler on the Roof (Dir. Michael P. Webb)

2000: Godspell, A Funny Thing Happened on the Way to the Forum, & Hans Christian Andersen, The Storyteller's Story (Dir. Michael P. Webb)

2001: The Music Man, Grease, & Rebels (Dir. Michael P. Webb)

2002: South Pacific, Honk!, & 42nd Street (Dir. Michael P. Webb)

2003: Big River, Just So, & Children of Eden (Dir. Michael P. Webb)

2004: Show Boat, You're A Good Man, Charlie Brown, The Hot Mikado, & Seussical (Dir. Michael P. Webb)

2005: Oklahoma!, Jesus Christ Superstar, Disney's Beauty & the Beast, & Chess (Dir. Michael P. Webb)

2006: Cats, State Fair, Miss Saigon, & Joseph and the Amazing Technicolor Dreamcoat (Dir. Michael P. Webb)

2007: Peter Pan, Disney's Geppetto & Son, Jekyll & Hyde, & Ragtime (Dir. Michael P. Webb)

2008: Jonah- An Old Testament Yarn, The Wiz, Little Shop of Horrors, & Thoroughly Modern Millie (Dir. Michael P. Webb)

2009: David the King, Evita, The King and I, & The Producers (Dir. by Michael P. Webb)

2010: Chicago, Aida, Annie, & Rent (Dir. by Michael P. Webb)

2011: The Phantom of the Opera, After Dark, The Drowsy Chaperone, & Hairspray (Dir. Michael P. Webb)

2012: Sweeney Todd: The Demon Barber of Fleet Street, Little Women, Into the Woods, & 9 to 5: The Musical (Dir. Michael P. Webb)

2013: Starlight Express, Xanadu, The 25th Annual Putnam County Spelling Bee, & Les Misérables (Dir. Michael P. Webb)

2014: The Sound of Music, Tintypes, Honk!, Spamalot, & Angel (Dir. Michael P. Webb)

2015: Mary Poppins, The Last Five Years, Memphis, & Young Frankenstein (Dir. Michael P. Webb)

2016: Chitty Chitty Bang Bang, Jesus Christ Superstar, The Phantom of the Opera, & Children of Eden (Dir. Michael P. Webb)

2017: Disney's Beauty and the Beast, Peter and the Starcatcher, Sister Act, & Godspell (Dir. Christopher D. Brady)

2018: Shrek the Musical, Jane Eyre, Dirty Rotten Scoundrels, & Anything Goes (Dir. Christopher D. Brady)

2019: Mamma Mia!, West Side Story, Joseph and the Amazing Technicolor Dreamcoat (Dir. Christopher D. Brad), & The Addams Family (Dir. Hannah R. Sleger)

2020: No season due to the COVID-19 pandemic

2021: A Gentleman's Guide to Love and Murder (Dir. Richard Raether), You’re A Good Man Charlie Brown, Once Upon a Mattress, & Little Shop of Horrors (Dir. Christopher D. Brady)

2022: The Little Mermaid, Disaster! (Dir. Christopher D. Brady), Dreamgirls, (Dir. Mychall Miller-Cornejo) & Hello Dolly! (Dir. Wendy Taylor)

2023: Footloose: The Musical (Dir. Amanda Jensen), In The Heights (Dir. Mychall Miller-Cornejo), Oliver!, & Cinderella (Dir. Christopher D. Brady)

2024: Legally Blonde (Dir. Clarissa Dahlhauser), Guys & Dolls (Dir. Mychall Miller-Cornejo), The Color Purple (Dir. Marcus Tobias), & Newsies (Dir. Christopher D. Brady)

2025: SpongeBob: The Musical (Dir. Mychall-Miller Cornejo), Grease (Dir. Jennifer Thompson), Ragtime (Dir. Christopher D. Brady), The Wedding Singer (Dir. Clarissa Dahlhauser)

2026: The Wizard Of Oz (Dir. Rebecca Jensen), Once On This Island (Dir. Christopher D. Brady), Something Rotten (Dir. Mychall-Miller Cornejo), 9 To 5 (Dir. Tessa Castaneda)

== Starlittle Series ==
In 2018, Starlight Theatre introduced the Starlittle series. This series contained shows aimed towards young children and families. These shows occurred at the end of the main Starlight season.

List of Starlittle Performances and Directors

2018: Cinderella... After the Ball (Dir. Spencer Douglas)

2019: Madagascar (Dir. Mychall Miller-Cornejo)

2020: No season due to the COVID-19 pandemic

2021: Pinkalicious (Dir. Theresa Garner)

2022: How I Became A Pirate (Dir. Rebecca Jensen)

2023: The Stinky Cheese Man & Other Fairly Stupid Tales (Dir. Jennifer Thompson)

In November 2023, it was announced that the Starlittle series would be retired and replaced with the Starbright series which are shows that primarily cast from the ages of 8 to 18.

== Starbright ==
In November 2023, Starlight Theatre announced that the Starlittle series would be retired. It has been replaced by the Starbright series which casts from the ages of 8 to 18. Unlike the Starlittle series, the Starbright series is not primarily for young children and families but is a series where young talent can get involved at Starlight. The Starbright series premiered in 2024.

=== List of Starbright Performances and Directors ===
2024: Disney's Beauty and The Beast (Dir. Jennifer Thompson)

2025: Mary Poppins (Dir. Rebecca Jensen)

2026: The Addams Family (Dir. Theresa Garner-Wilson)

== Starlight Shakes ==
Starlight Theatre has done a number of Shakespeare performances. These performances are done on the Ray Castle Stage, which is rebuilt every year in the east lawn next to the Bengt Sjostrom Theatre.

List of Shakespeare Performances and Directors

2018: The Taming of the Shrew (Dir. Hannah R. Sleger)

2019: Twelfth Night (Dir. Kevin Poole)

2020: No Shakespeare due to the COVID-19 pandemic

2021: Macbeth (Dir. Claire Dahlhauser)

2022: A Comedy of Errors (Dir. Jo Laughran)

2023: Love's Labour's Lost (Dir. Kevin Poole)

2024: Julius Ceaser (Dir. Kevin Poole)

2025: A Midsummer Night's Dream (Dir. Ethan McBee)

2026: The Tempest (Dir. Deborah Mogford)

== Starlight Traditions ==
Starlight Theatre has put on several productions in a black box theatre created on the stage of the Bengt Sjostrom Theatre. This black box theatre has come to be known as “The Cabin” and is reserved for productions performed in the fall and winter. The productions put on in the cabin have been mostly Christmas shows, with the exception of 2022. These productions are referred to as “traditions.”

List of Tradition performances and directors

2018: A Charlie Brown Christmas (Dir. Christopher D. Brady)

2019: A Christmas Story: The Musical (Dir. Christopher D. Brady)

2020: No tradition due to the COVID-19 pandemic

2021: The Best Christmas Pageant Ever (Dir. Christopher D. Brady)

2022: The Rocky Horror Show (Dir. Andrew Harth)
