= Rockford Mass Transit District =

Bus company in Rockford, Illinois, US

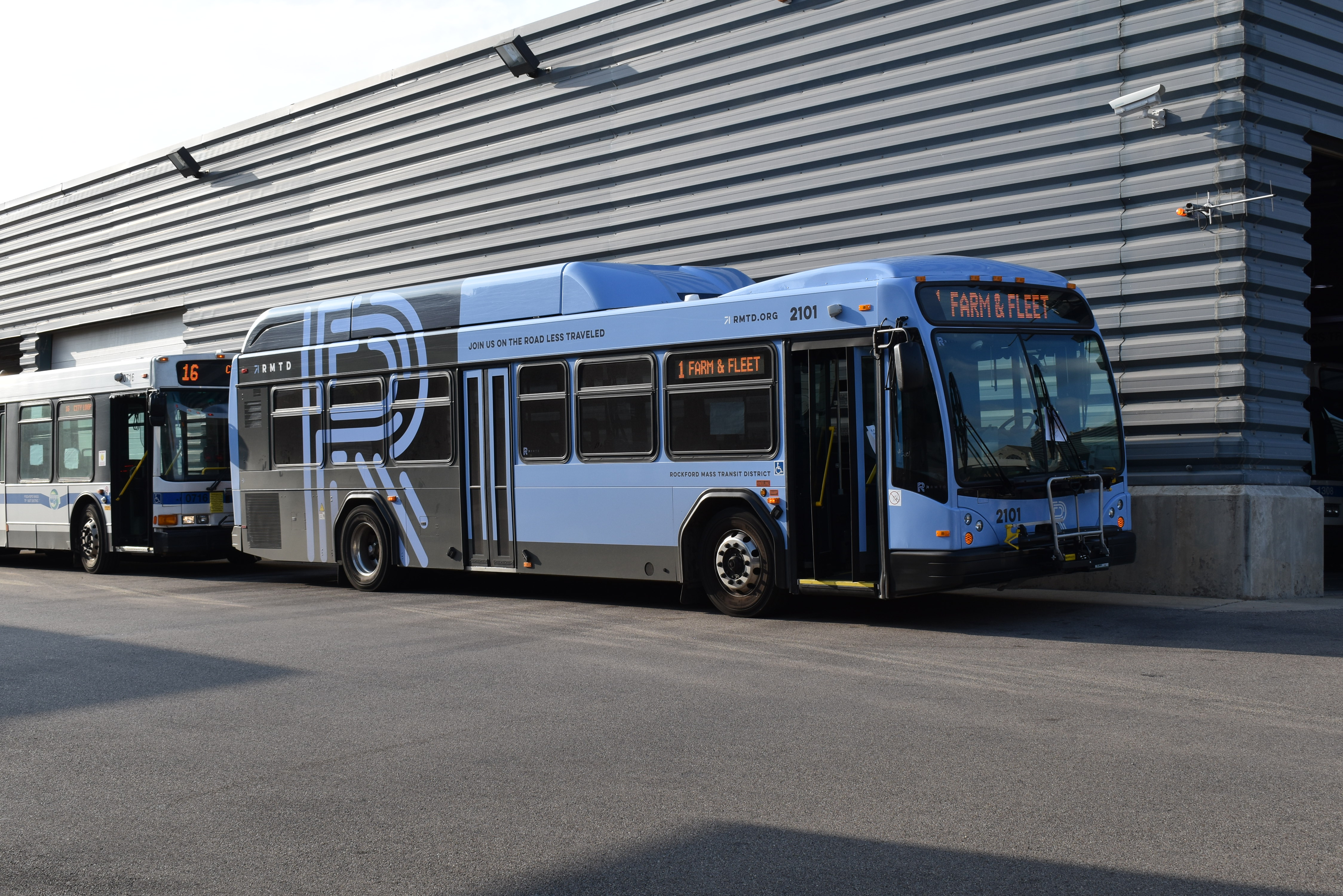
- A RMTD bus at the downtown transit center in 2022
- Founded: February 15, 1971
- Headquarters: 520 Mulberry Street; Rockford, Illinois
- Service area: Rockford, Illinois; Loves Park, Illinois; Machesney Park, Illinois; Belvidere, Illinois
- Service type: Bus, Paratransit
- Routes: 30
- Depots: 2
- Fleet: 40 buses
- Daily ridership: 5,200 (weekdays, Q2 2026)
- Annual ridership: 1,525,400 (2025)
- Fuel type: Gas, Diesel, Diesel-Hybrids, and Fully Electric
- Website: rmtd.org

The Rockford Mass Transit District is the public transportation operator for the Rockford metropolitan area, Illinois. Service is provided six days per week along 19 routes, with several of these routes being combined into five Sunday routes that service a large portion of the system. The core of the system is contained in The City Loop (Route 16 clockwise and 17 counterclockwise), which interconnects with every other service. In 2025, the system had a ridership of 1,525,400, or about 5,200 per weekday as of the second quarter of 2026.

== History ==
The previous RMTD logo

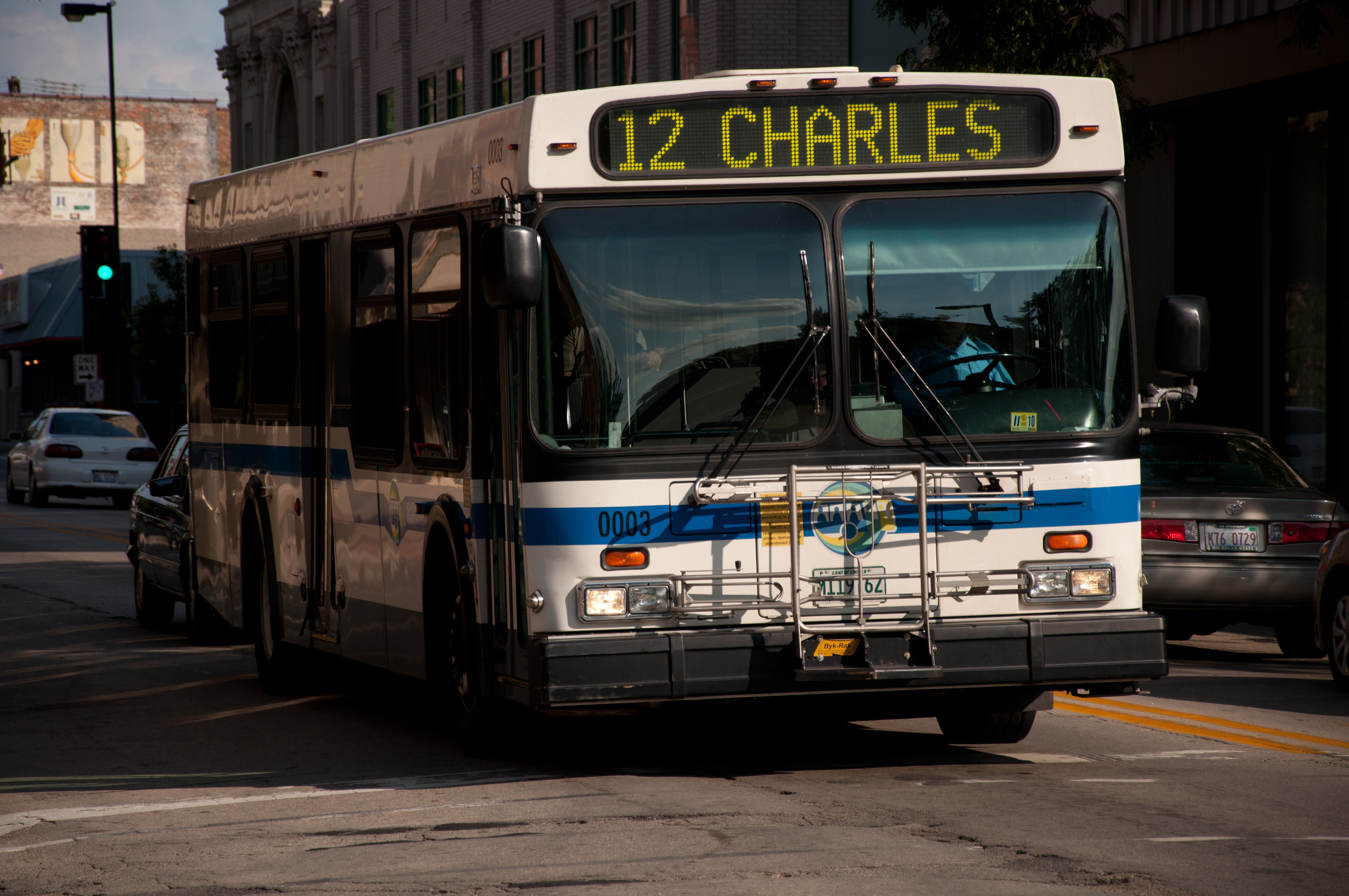
A RMTD bus in 2010

On April 20, 2020, RMTD reduced its daily routes after six employees, including five drivers, tested positive for COVID-19. The district later received a $9.3 million grant from the U.S. Department of Transportation as part of the CARES Act.

In August 2020, the pre-COVID-19 route system resumed and RMTD launched Token Transit, a mobile fare app that allows passengers to purchase bus passes on their cell phones. The app displays a digital bus pass or ticket on the phone's screen, eliminating the need for a paper pass or cash.

On June 15, 2023, RMTD unveiled six new battery-electric buses, the first electric buses in the fleet. The buses will replace diesel buses from 2007, reducing carbon emissions by 4,500 metric tons annually. RMTD plans to have a fully electric fleet by 2036.

== Facilities ==
The Downtown Transfer Center, located at 501 West State Street, is the primary hub for the RMTD, serving 14 routes. The center opened February 11, 2019, replacing an earlier transfer facility at the same location. The transfer center provides riders with restrooms, vending machines, an indoor waiting area and a location to purchase tickets and passes.

The East Side Transfer Center, located at 725 North Lyford Road, opened in 2012, serving buses and riders on the east side of Rockford with 4 routes. The transfer center provides riders with restrooms, vending machines, an indoor waiting area and a location to purchase tickets and passes. In addition to serving RMTD buses, Greyhound Lines intercity buses also stop here.

== Fixed route ridership ==
The ridership statistics shown here are of fixed route services only and do not include demand response.

== See also ==
- List of bus transit systems in the United States
