= The Witness for the Prosecution (TV series) =

2016 British drama television serial

- DVD cover
- Genre: Crime drama; Mystery; Thriller
- Based on: The Witness for the Prosecution by Agatha Christie
- Written by: Sarah Phelps
- Directed by: Julian Jarrold
- Starring: Toby Jones; Andrea Riseborough; David Haig; Monica Dolan; Billy Howle; Paul Ready; Tim McMullan; Hayley Carmichael; Dorian Lough; Kim Cattrall
- Country of origin: United Kingdom
- Original language: English
- No. of episodes: 2

Production
- Executive producers: Mathew Pritchard; Hilary Strong; Karen Thrussell; Damien Timmer; Matthew Read; Sarah Phelps
- Producer: Colin Wratten
- Cinematography: Felix Wiedemann
- Running time: 120 minutes
- Production companies: Mammoth Screen; Agatha Christie Productions; Acorn Productions; A&E Networks

Original release
- Network: BBC One; BBC One HD
- Release: 26 December – 27 December 2016

The Witness for the Prosecution is a British two-part crime drama mystery thriller broadcast on BBC One over Christmas 2016. The two-part programme was adapted by Sarah Phelps and directed by Julian Jarrold and is based on Agatha Christie's short story of the same name. The expanded plot is based on Christie's original short story with the original ending, which is different from that of previous stage, film and television versions, including Billy Wilder's 1957 film version.

== Cast and characters ==
- Billy Howle as Leonard Vole, the accused
- Andrea Riseborough as Romaine Heilger, Leonard's partner
- Monica Dolan as Janet McIntyre, Emily's maid
- Kim Cattrall as Emily French, the victim
- Toby Jones as John Mayhew, Leonard's solicitor
- David Haig as Sir Charles Carter, a barrister
- Tim McMullan as Sir Hugo Meredith, the prosecutor
- Robert East as Justice Greville Parris, the judge
- Dorian Lough as Detective Breem
- Hayley Carmichael as Alice Mayhew, Mayhew's wife
- Paul Ready as Tripp

== Episodes ==
No.	Title	Directed by	Written by	Original release date	UK viewers (millions)
1	Episode 1	Julian Jarrold	Sarah Phelps	26 December 2016	7.70
In 1923 London, Leonard Vole is sacked from his job as a waiter, after which socialite Emily French, a wealthy widow twice his age, invites him back to her Kensington mansion. Emily pays him to be her companion until three months later, when she is found bludgeoned to death. Her jealous maid, Janet, accuses Leonard, whom Emily had made the sole recipient of her will. His live-in partner, Viennese actress Romaine, is promoted from chorus girl to star by the theatre to capitalise on the sensational trial. Prosecutors allege Leonard killed Emily after she learned about Romaine. His middle-class solicitor, John Mayhew, believes in Leonard's innocence and is inspired by Romaine's sweet nature. Leonard's life depends on Romaine confirming his alibi. After seeming to forgive him for his transgression, she visits him in prison and tells him: "Hang". Mayhew confronts Romaine, who mocks him for believing in love.
2	Episode 2	Julian Jarrold	Sarah Phelps	27 December 2016	6.99
Romaine gives devastating testimony under oath that Leonard arrived home after the murder covered in blood, bragging that he was now a rich man. Mayhew encounters Christine Moffat, the former star of Romaine's show, whose face Romaine badly disfigured. Christine gives him a letter that is used in court to expose Romaine's cruel scheme to get Leonard hanged in order to marry her lover, Max, who was previously with Christine. It is revealed that Romaine is actually already married, which only Leonard knew. After Janet's testimony is discredited, Leonard is acquitted, and Romaine is arrested on perjury charges. Janet is convicted and hanged for the murder. Now famous and successful, Mayhew takes his wife to France, where he discovers the wealthy Leonard and his new bride: Romaine. Romaine believed no jury would believe her if she had defended her husband in court, but they would believe in his innocence if she were uncovered as trying to frame him so he would hang and she could be with her lover. Romaine, in disguise as Christine, gave the defence evidence that 'proved' Romaine to want her husband dead. They toast Mayhew who fell for their ruse. Mayhew, estranged from his wife since the death of their son in the war, and shattered by Leonard's guilt, decides to drown himself by walking far out into the sea during low tide.

== Critical reception ==
Reviewing Part 1 in The Daily Telegraph, Gerard O'Donovan decided, "Much of its sophistication is down to [scriptwriter Sarah Phelps'] multi-layered reworking of Christie's hit 1950s stage drama, that ekes every possible drop of emotion and mystery from what is a very simple premise. Add to that supremely atmospheric set design, Jullian Jarrold's richly inventive direction, plus a terrific cast, and a slice of Yuletide TV heaven was born." He found Riseborough to be the "star of the show", praising "the extraordinary blend of damage and menace she managed to convey", and judged that the "concluding part promises to be one to savour".

The following day, O'Donovan found that in Part 2, "The biggest coup of the BBC's festive adaptation was that not only did it revert to Christie's original twist, but added considerably to it, making for a[n] ... ending […which…] transformed a tale of moral turpitude and greed into something of much greater depth and contemporary resonance." Again praising the "captivating" Riseborough, he found that "Toby Jones was also superb, all too credible as small-time solicitor John Mayhew", and added, "At every step, the acting […] and skilfully-evoked atmosphere added layer upon layer of complexity, moral ambiguity and humour to what was at heart a simple premise".

Writing in the Radio Times, Ben Dowell acknowledged "an ingenious plot twist – known to many Christie aficionados – but here given a few smart thematic manipulations by scriptwriter Sarah Phelps", noting her "major achievement is to make the First World War the emotional lynchpin of the whole saga". Dowell concluded by saying, "In the end this was a story of many loves—of Emily French's love for Vole, of Mayhew's unrequited love for his wife, even Janet's love for Emily. Pole star of course was the passion between Vole and Romaine which burns far too brightly. This was really compelling stuff".

== See also ==
- Witness for the Prosecution (1957)
- Witness for the Prosecution (1982)
