= The Witness for the Prosecution =

1925 short story by Agatha Christie

"The Witness for the Prosecution" is a short story and play by British author Agatha Christie. The story was initially published as "Traitor's Hands" in Flynn's, a weekly pulp magazine, in the edition of 31 January 1925.

In 1933, the story was published for the first time as "The Witness for the Prosecution" in the collection The Hound of Death that appeared only in the United Kingdom. In 1948, it was published in the United States under that title in the collection The Witness for the Prosecution and Other Stories. In 1995, the story was included in Mystery Writers of America's The Top 100 Mystery Novels of All Time list. The story has been adapted for stage, film and television.

== Plot ==
Leonard Vole is arrested for the murder of Emily French, a wealthy old woman. Unaware that he was a married man, Miss French made him her principal heir, casting suspicion on Leonard. When his wife, Romaine, agrees to testify, she does so not in Leonard's defence but as a witness for the prosecution. Romaine's decision is part of a complicated plan to free her husband. Instead of testifying for his defence (where no one would believe her) she first gives the prosecution its strongest evidence, then fabricates new evidence that discredits her testimony, believing that her impeachment as an unfaithful wife would improve Leonard's chances of acquittal far more than her testimony for the defence. The plan works and he is acquitted. It is then revealed that Leonard Vole actually did kill Emily French.

=== Alterations ===
The original short story ended abruptly with the major twist—Romaine's revelation that Leonard Vole was in fact guilty. Over time, Christie grew dissatisfied with this abrupt and dystopian ending (one of the few Christie endings in which a murderer escapes punishment), which would have had to be sanitised in any event for stage and film versions where such a brutal crime going unpunished would have been unthinkable at the time.

In her subsequent rewriting of the story as a play she added a young mistress for Leonard, who does not appear until the end of the play. The mistress and Leonard are about to leave Romaine (called "Christine" in all film and television versions, and most stage productions after the original Broadway production, until the 2016 television version) to be arrested for perjury, when Romaine grabs a knife, and stabs and kills Leonard. She will be defended by the same attorney she tricked into getting Leonard acquitted in the first place. This remained the standard production format until Sarah Phelps' 2016 television version, which restored the original ending but changed the fates of other characters.

== Characters (play) ==
- Leonard Vole, the accused
- Emily French, the victim
- Janet Mackenzie, Emily French's maid
- Romaine (subsequently renamed as Christine) Heilger/Vole, "wife" of the accused
- Mr Mayhew / Mayherne, the solicitor of the accused
- Sir Wilfrid Robarts, QC, senior counsel of the accused
- Mr Myers, QC, the Crown prosecutor
- Mr Justice Wainwright, the judge
- Inspector Hearne, the arresting officer
- Greta, Sir Wilfrid's typist
- Carter, Sir Wilfrid's clerk

== Publishing history ==
- 1925: Flynn's Weekly, 31 January – as Traitor's Hands
- 1933: The Hound of Death
- 1948: The Witness for the Prosecution and Other Stories
- 1993: The Mousetrap & Other Plays

== In other media ==
=== Theatre ===
- Witness for the Prosecution was adapted as a play by Agatha Christie. The play opened in London on 28 October 1953 at the Winter Garden Theatre, produced by Peter Saunders, and directed by Wallace Douglas. The premiere cast included Derek Blomfield as Leonard Vole, Patricia Jessel as Romaine Vole, and David Horne as Sir Wilfrid Robarts.
- The play opened on Broadway on 16 December 1954.
- 2001 Свидетель обвинения (Russia)
- 2005 Khara Sangaycha Tar (Marathi)
- 2011 (検察側の証人 [Kensatsugawa no shonin] ) Witness for the Prosecution (Japan)
- 2017 A unique courtroom staging opened at London County Hall to critical acclaim, directed by Lucy Bailey and produced by Eleanor Lloyd Productions and Rebecca Stafford Productions
- 2018 "奪命証人" Witness for the Prosecution by Carina Lau, Paul Chun Pui and Tse Kwan Ho (Hong Kong)
- 2018 Tomar Kono Satyo Nei (Bengali)
- 2024 Pieter Toerien presents Agatha Christie’s Witness for the Prosecution starring Graham Hopkins, Sharon Spiegel Wagner, Mike Huff, Peter Terry, Craig Jackson, Brett Kruger, Dianne Simpson, Matthew Lotter, Micah Stojakovic and Jordan Soares (South Africa)

=== Film ===
- A film version of Witness for the Prosecution premiered in 1957 (and reached general release in early 1958), with Tyrone Power as Leonard Vole, Marlene Dietrich as Christine Vole and Charles Laughton as Sir Wilfrid Robarts Q.C. The film was adapted by Larry Marcus, Harry Kurnitz and the film's director, Billy Wilder. The film received six Academy Award nominations including Best Picture.
- In August 2016, Variety reported that Ben Affleck was in talks to direct and star in a remake of Witness for the Prosecution. Christopher Keyser was to write the script, and Affleck would produce, with Matt Damon, Jennifer Todd and the Agatha Christie estate. The project was never realized.
- The 2016 BBC TV mini series was also issued as a standalone film.
- In January 2026, it was announced by Deadline that a new adaptation of this story is being written by Bash Doran for 20th Century Studios.

=== Television ===
- BBC Television produced Witness for the Prosecution in 1949, with Dale Rogers as Leonard Vole, Mary Kerridge as Romaine Vole and Derek Elphinstone as Sir Wilfrid Robarts Q.C. This version was directed by John Glyn-Jones and adapted by Sidney Budd.
- Witness for the Prosecution was next adapted for NBC, also in 1949, with Nicholas Saunders as Leonard Vole. This version aired as part of The Chevrolet Tele-Theatre, and was directed by Gordon Duff.
- The 7 November 1950 episode of the CBS anthology series Danger was an adaptation of this story.
- CBS produced a second adaptation of Witness for the Prosecution in 1953, with Tom Drake as Leonard Vole, Andrea King as Romaine Vole and Edward G. Robinson as Sir Wilfrid Robarts Q.C. This version, which aired as part of the anthology series Lux Video Theatre, was directed by Richard Goode and adapted by Anne Howard Bailey.
- Hallmark television produced Witness for the Prosecution in 1982, with Beau Bridges as Leonard Vole, Diana Rigg as Christine Vole and Ralph Richardson as Sir Wilfrid Robarts Q.C. This version was based on the Billy Wilder movie with adaptions by John Gay, and was directed by Alan Gibson.
- The BBC produced another two-part version of The Witness for the Prosecution for Christmas 2016 and first broadcast on 26 and 27 December, with Kim Cattrall as Emily French, Billy Howle as Leonard Vole, Andrea Riseborough as Romaine Heilger, Toby Jones as John Mayhew, and David Haig as Sir Charles Carter.
