= The Hound of Death =

1933 short story collection by Agatha Christie

- Dust-jacket illustration of the first UK edition
- Author: Agatha Christie
- Cover artist: Dermonay
- Language: English
- Genre: Short stories
- Publisher: Odhams Press
- Publication date: October 1933
- Publication place: United Kingdom
- Media type: Print (hardback & paperback)
- Pages: 252 (first edition, hardcover)
- Preceded by: Lord Edgware Dies
- Followed by: Murder on the Orient Express

The Hound of Death and Other Stories is a collection of twelve short stories by British writer Agatha Christie, first published in the United Kingdom in October 1933. Unusually, the collection was not published by Christie's regular publishers, William Collins & Sons, but by Odhams Press, and was not available to purchase in shops (see Publication of book collection below).

This was the first time that a Christie book had been published in the UK but not in the US, although all of the stories contained within it appeared in later US collections (see US book appearances of stories below). Unusually, most of these are tales of fate and the supernatural, with comparatively little detective content. This collection is most notable for the first appearance in a book of Christie's short story "The Witness for the Prosecution". The author subsequently wrote an award-winning play based on this story which has been adapted for the 1957 film and twice for television.

== List of stories ==
- "The Hound of Death"
- "The Red Signal"
- "The Fourth Man"
- "The Gypsy"
- "The Lamp"
- "Wireless"
- "The Witness for the Prosecution"
- "The Mystery of the Blue Jar"
- "The Strange Case of Sir Arthur Carmichael"
- "The Call of Wings"
- "The Last Séance"
- "SOS"

== Plot summaries ==
=== The Hound of Death ===
William P. Ryan, an American journalist, is having lunch with a friend called Anstruther when he hears that the latter is about to visit his sister in Folbridge, Cornwall, at her house called "Treane". Ryan has heard of the place, and tells a story from the recent First World War when he heard of a German attempt to take over a convent during the Rape of Belgium. As soon as the soldiers entered the building it blew up, killing them all. It was proven that the soldiers had no high explosives on them, and speaking with the locals afterwards Ryan was told of one of the nuns having miraculous powers: she brought down a lightning bolt from heaven that destroyed the convent and killed the Germans. All that was left of the building were two walls, one of which had a powder mark in the shape of a giant hound. This scared the local peasants who avoided the area after dark. The nun in question survived and went with other refugees to "Treane" in Cornwall, and Anstruther confirms that his sister did take in some Belgians at the time.

In Cornwall, Anstruther finds out from his sister that the nun, Marie Angelique, is still in the area. She has constant hallucinations and is being studied by a local, new, young doctor by the name of Rose, who intends to write a monograph on her condition. Anstruther meets Rose and persuades him to let him meet the young nun.

She is boarding with the local district nurse. She talks of her dreams, but when Anstruther tells her of the story he heard from Ryan, she is shocked to realise that what she thought was a dream was true – that of unleashing the "Hound of Death" on the Germans as they approached the altar. She rambles on about the "City of Circles" and the "People of the Crystal", and when they have left her, Rose tells Anstruther that he has heard her mention crystals before, and on a previous occasion he produced a crystal and showed it to her to test her reaction. She gasped, "Then the faith still lives!"

The next day, the young nun tells Anstruther that she feels that the crystal is a symbol of faith, possibly a second Christ, and the faith has endured for many centuries. Rose tries a word association test in which Marie Angelique makes references to signs. There are seven signs, each with its color and symbol. The sixth sign is death and destruction, its symbol the hound. Anstruther starts to feel uneasy about Rose's interest in the case, suspecting something more than purely medical motives. Some time later, Anstruther receives a letter from the nun in which she voices her fears of Rose and says that the doctor is trying to obtain her powers by progressing to the sixth sign. The same day he hears from his sister that both Rose and the nun are dead. A landslide swept away the cliffside cottage they were in, and the debris on the beach is in the shape of a giant hound. He also hears that Rose's rich uncle died the same night, struck by lightning. The uncle's will had left everything to Rose. Anstruther later comes into possession of Rose's notes, which detail his attempts to become a superman with "the Power of Death" in his hands. Anstruther suspects that Rose obtained the Power of Death, killed his uncle for money, but unable to control the power properly, unleashed the Hound of Death.

=== The Red Signal ===
A dinner party is taking place in the London home of Jack and Claire Trent. Their three guests are a Mrs Violet Eversleigh, Sir Alington West (a noted psychiatrist), and West's nephew, Dermot West. The talk turns round to precognitive abilities and premonitions, of which Sir Alington is dismissive, believing them to be both coincidences and situations that are talked up after the event. Dermot is not so sure, describing such feelings as having a red signal – "danger ahead!" – and tells one story of near-death in Mesopotamia, when he avoided being murdered by an Arab servant. What he does not tell the group is that he is again experiencing the red signal tonight at the dinner party. He ponders who could be the source of danger, his thoughts moving to his love for Claire Trent, a feeling that he constantly suppresses as Jack Trent is his best friend. Coming out of his reverie, he finds the conversation has turned to madness and the dangers of suppressing delusions. Sir Alington looks pointedly at Claire Trent, who is visibly disturbed by this talk.

One of the purposes of the evening is to meet a medium who is there to conduct a sitting. She does so and warns one of the people in the room not to go home, as there is danger there. The party breaks up and Sir Alington asks Dermot to accompany him home to Harley Street before going on to join his friends at the Grafton Galleries. Once inside, he tells his nephew that he knows of his infatuation for Claire, and admonishes him not to give in to it. He disapproves of divorce, and speaks of a history of insanity in their family, and his suspicions of homicidal mania. The discussion becomes emotional and Dermot utters a threat against his uncle, one which is overheard by the manservant, Johnson, as he brings in drinks. Going to the Grafton Galleries, Claire tells Dermot that his feelings for her are reciprocated, and because of this she wants him to go away. He asks her to join him, but she refuses.

Going back to his flat, Dermot is once again assailed by the feeling of danger and, to his astonishment, finds a revolver hidden in a bedroom drawer. There is a knock on the door and Dermot opens it to the police. The feeling of danger makes him tell the police that he is Milson, his own manservant, and the police tell him that his "master" is wanted for the murder of Sir Alington who was shot dead earlier that night after being overheard arguing with his nephew. The police search the flat, find the revolver, and decide to leave an officer there in case West "comes back". Dermot escapes from the flat through the kitchen window while supposedly getting drinks, and quickly bumps into Jack Trent who gets him away to his own house. He locks himself in a room with Dermot, produces a gun, and then insanely confesses to the murder. Sir Alington recognised his condition and was at the dinner party to assess his true mental state. Dermot assumed that his uncle was speaking of Claire, who was actually assisting Sir Alington in his diagnosis. She now assists the police to gain entry to the house and the locked room. Jack shoots himself before they can take him.

=== The Fourth Man ===
Canon Parfitt just manages to catch his train on time for a night journey. In his first class carriage he is reacquainted with Sir George Durand, a famous lawyer. A third man in the carriage introduces himself as Dr Campbell Clark, an eminent physician who is an expert on conditions of the mind. There is a fourth man with them who appears to be asleep.

The three other men, confessing to various degrees of insomnia, talk throughout the journey. Their conversation covers the idea that a body can house more than one soul and Dr Clark cites the case of a French girl called Felicie Bault. She was a Brittany peasant who, at the age of five, lost her parents when her father in a drunken rage strangled her mother, and he was then transported for life. She was taken into the care of a Miss Slater, an English woman, who ran a charity orphanage in the area. Felicie was slightly backward and brutish-looking and Miss Slater had an uphill task to teach her the rudiments of reading and writing. In later years she had one maid's job after another due to her perceived stupidity and laziness. Suddenly, at the age of twenty-two, a change came over her. Following a mental illness she split into three or four distinct personalities. The first was the continuation of her known self but the second was cultured and educated, able to play the piano and speak two foreign languages. The third had the second's education but also knew of the coarser side of life and the less respectable side of Parisian society. The fourth seemed dreamy and pious but was suspected to be the third putting on an act. The change from one personality to another occurred after a severe headache and a deep sleep, and left her with no recollection of the other personalities. The end of the story came when she was discovered dead in bed one morning, somehow having strangled herself with her own hands.

At this point, the fourth man in the carriage laughs and joins in the conversation. He speaks with a foreign accent and tells them that Felicie's case is inextricably bound up with that of another girl called Annette Ravel. The two girls and the man himself – Raoul Letardeau – were together at Miss Slater's orphanage. He was a witness to the bullying hold that Annette had over Felicie, that included an incident when Annette seems to have successfully hypnotised Felicie into carrying out an act of which she had no memory. He also saw how much Felicie hated Annette. The latter was an ambitious girl who was determined to become a famous dancer in Paris. Raoul left the orphanage when work was found for him that took him abroad for five years. Returning to Paris he saw by chance a poster advertising Annette as singing on the stage and met her in her dressing room. She seemed to have achieved her ambitions but Raoul witnessed the unmistakable signs of consumption, and two years later he returned to Miss Slater's orphanage where Annette had retreated, plainly dying but refusing to believe so. Felicie was also there, serving as a maid, as hateful of Annette as ever but still bullied and humiliated by the ruthless woman who seemed to have a strange hold on her.

Annette died soon afterwards. When Raoul returned six months later he was told by an amazed Miss Slater of the first symptoms of Felicie's abnormal personality changes. He witnessed one of these and also heard Felicie speak of Annette, "taking ... the clothes from your back, the soul from your body" and she was plainly in some terror of the dead girl. Nevertheless, she knew that she had strong hands – should she wish to escape ... The other three are amazed to hear the story and Raoul emphasises how much Annette longed for her life. The doctor had previously said that the body was a residence for the soul. Raoul compares the situation to finding a burglar in one's home.

=== The Gypsy ===
Dickie Carpenter breaks off his recent engagement to Esther Lawes and confides the reason to Mcfarlane, a dour Scot who is the fiancée of Rachel Lawes, Esther's younger sister. Dickie, a former naval man, has had an aversion to gypsies since his childhood, when he started to have recurring dreams in which he would be in a given situation and suddenly feel a presence. When he looked up, a gypsy woman stood there looking at him. The sudden appearance of this woman always unnerved him, although it was not until some years after these dreams started that he encountered a real gypsy. This happened on a walk in the New Forest, and she warned him not to take a certain path. He ignored her and the wooden bridge he was crossing broke beneath his weight, casting him into the fast-running stream below and nearly drowning him.

These occurrences came back to him when he returned to England and started to see the Lawes family. At one dinner party he saw a woman called Alistair Haworth whom he seemed to see in his own eyes as wearing a red scarf on her head, just like the gypsy of his dreams. He walked on the terrace with her after dinner and she warned him not to go back into the house. He did so and found himself falling for Esther Lawes. They became engaged a week later and two weeks after that he again caught sight of Mrs Haworth who once more warned him. He again ignored her and that very night Esther stated that, after all, she did not love him. The reason he is now confiding in Macfarlane is that he is due for a routine operation, and he thought he saw in one of the nurses in the hospital the image of Mrs Haworth, who warned him not to go ahead with the surgery.

Dickie subsequently dies during the operation and some impulse makes Macfarlane go to see Mrs Haworth at her moorland home. There he is surprised to find that her husband is not really suited to such a striking woman as her. The two walk on the moors and Mrs Haworth tells Macfarlane that he too has second sight. For proof, she asks him to look at a rock and he fancies he sees a hollow filled with blood. She tells him it is a sacrificial stone from olden times and he has had his own vision. She confides that she married her husband because she saw some portent hanging over him and wanted to prevent it. She also tells Macfarlane that they won't meet again.

Determined to challenge the fates, Macfarlane drives back from his inn to the Haworth's cottage the next day and finds that the lady is dead. She drank something poisonous thinking it was her tonic and her husband is beside himself with grief. Back at his inn, the landlady tells him stories of long-gone ghosts seen on the moor, including a sailor and a gypsy. Macfarlane wonders if they will walk again.

=== The Lamp ===
Young widow Mrs Lancaster takes a lease on an empty house that sits in a square in an old cathedral town. Suspicious of the extremely low rent, she correctly guesses that the house is haunted and pushes the agent for details. He reluctantly tells her the version of the story that he has heard, about a man called Williams living there some thirty years ago with his young son. Williams went up to London for the day and, being a wanted man on the run, was arrested and jailed by the police. His young son was left to fend for himself in the house but died of starvation. The story goes that the boy's sobbing as he waits for his father to return can sometimes be heard.

Mrs Lancaster soon moves into the house with her elderly father, Mr Winburn, and her lively young son, Geoffrey. Mr Winburn knows that the house is haunted and hears another set of footsteps on the stairs following his grandson down. He also has a disturbing dream that he is in a town populated by no one but children who are begging him to know if he has "brought him". In addition, he overhears the servants gossiping about hearing a child cry. Somewhat oblivious to this, Geoffrey nevertheless asks his startled mother if he can play with the little boy that he sometimes sees watching him, but Mrs Lancaster brusquely stops all such talk. A month later, Geoffrey starts to fall ill and even his mother begins to hear the sobs of the other little boy with whom they seem to share the house. The doctor confesses to his grandfather that there is little they can do as Geoffrey's lungs were never strong. One night, Geoffrey dies and his mother and grandfather suddenly hear the sound of the other child's joyous laughter and the receding sound of two pairs of footsteps. The little boy has a playmate at last.

=== Wireless ===
Mary Harter, an old lady in her seventies, has a consultation with her doctor. He advises her that she has something of a weak heart and should avoid undue exertion to ensure many more years of life. Dr Meynall also tells Mrs Harter's beloved resident nephew, Charles Ridgeway, of the advice he has given, adding that Mrs Harter should be cheerfully distracted and avoid brooding. To this end, Charles persuades his aunt to have a radio installed. She resists at first, but quickly comes to enjoy the programmes that are broadcast. One evening, when Charles is out with friends, the radio suddenly emits the voice of her dead husband, Patrick, who tells her that he is coming for her soon. Although naturally shocked, Mrs Harter remains composed but thoughtful.

Some days later the radio set emits a similar message, and the old lady decides to ensure that her affairs are in order. She makes sure that Elizabeth, her maid, knows where her burial requests are kept, and decides to increase the amount she has left her in her will from fifty to one hundred pounds. To accomplish this, she writes to her lawyer and asks him to send her the will that he has in his possession. Mrs Harter is somewhat startled that day at lunch when Charles comments that, when he was coming up the drive of the house the previous evening, he thought he saw a face at an upstairs window, and realised afterwards that it resembled a portrait in a little-used room that he has since found out is that of Patrick Harter. The latter's widow looks on this as further proof that her time is near.

That evening, Mrs Harter again hears a message through the radio from Patrick, telling her that will be coming for her at half-past nine on Friday night. She writes a note detailing what she has heard as proof, should she die at that time, that it is possible to receive messages from the afterlife. She gives this to Elizabeth to pass on to the doctor in the event of her death. On the Friday night in question, she sits in her room with the radio switched on and the will in her hand as she peruses its contents, having had fifty pounds in cash withdrawn from the bank to supplement the amount bequeathed to Elizabeth. She hears the noise of a step outside her room and staggers to her feet, dropping something from her fingers as the door swings open and she sees her dead husband's bewhiskered figure standing before her. She collapses and is found an hour later by Elizabeth.

Two days later the maid passes the note to the doctor, who dismisses it all as hallucinations. Charles agrees, not wanting to spoil things now that his plan appears to be reaching fruition. Having safely disconnected the wire from the radio set to his bedroom, and burnt the false whiskers he wore on the night of his aunt's death, he looks forward to the reading of the will and inheriting his aunt's money – a sum desperately needed to stave off possible imprisonment as a result of his business misdeeds.

He receives a shock when his aunt's lawyer calls and tells him that he posted the will on to the dead lady at her request. It can no longer be found among her papers, and Charles realises that, as she fell dying, the will she was holding in her fingers dropped into the fire. No other copy exists, and therefore a former will comes into effect. This one left Harter's fortune to a niece (Charles's cousin) Miriam, who had proved unsatisfactory to her aunt for marrying a man of whom her aunt did not approve. Charles receives a second shock when the doctor telephones him to say that the results of the autopsy prove that his aunt's heart was in a worse condition than he thought, and there is no way she could have lived more than two months at the outside. Charles angrily realises he need never have set up his elaborate stunt.

=== The Witness for the Prosecution ===
A solicitor, Mr Mayherne, interviews his latest client in his office: Leonard Vole is a young man who has been arrested on the capital charge of the murder of an old lady, Miss Emily French. Vole tells how he met Miss French when he helped her to pick up some parcels she dropped in Oxford Street and, by coincidence, he met her again that night at a party in Cricklewood. She asked him to call at her house and he was ribbed by his friends, who joked that he had made a conquest of a rich, lonely old lady.

He did call and struck up a friendship with Miss French, and started to see her on many other occasions at a time when he himself was in low water financially. Vole's story is that Miss French asked him for financial advice, despite the testimony of both her maid, Janet Mackenzie, and Miss French's bankers that the old lady was astute enough herself on these matters. He protests that he never swindled her of a single penny and, if he had been doing so, surely her death would have frustrated his plans? Vole is then staggered when Mayherne tells him that he is the principal beneficiary of Miss French's will, and that Janet Mackenzie swears that her mistress told her that Vole was informed of this change in his fortunes.

The facts of the murder are that Janet Mackenzie, on her night off, returned to Miss French's house briefly at half-past-nine and heard voices in the sitting-room. One was Miss French and the other was a man's. The next morning, the body of Miss French was found, killed with a crowbar, and several items had been taken from the house. Burglary was at first suspected, but Miss Mackenzie's suspicions of Vole pointed the police in his direction and led eventually to his arrest. Vole, though, is delighted to hear of Miss Mackenzie's testimony about the visitor at nine-thirty, as he was with his wife, Romaine, at the time, and she can provide him with an alibi.

Mayherne has already wired Mrs Vole to return from a trip to Scotland to see him, and he goes to her house to interview her. He is surprised to find that she is foreign and is staggered when she cries out her hatred of Vole and that he is not her husband – she was an actress in Vienna, and her real husband is still living there, but in an asylum. She alleges that Vole returned from Miss French's an hour later than he claims and, as he is not her lawful husband, she can testify against him in court.

Romaine Heilger does indeed appear as a witness for the prosecution at the committal hearing, and Vole is sent for trial. In the intervening period, Mayherne tries to find evidence that will discredit Romaine, but he is unsuccessful until he receives a scrawled and badly spelt letter which directs him to call at an address in Stepney and ask for Miss Mogson if he wants evidence against the "painted foreign hussy". He does so, and in a reeking tenement slum meets a bent, middle-aged crone of a woman with terrible scars on her face caused by the throwing of sulphuric acid. This attack was carried out by a man by the name of Max with whom Romaine Heilger is now having an affair. Miss Mogson herself was involved with Max many years before, but Romaine took him away from her. Meyherne is passed a series of letters written by Romaine to Max, all dated, which prove that Vole is innocent and that Romaine is lying to be rid of him. Mayherne pays the crone twenty pounds for the letters, which are then read out at the trial. The case against Vole collapses and he is declared "Not Guilty". Mayherne is delighted at his success, but is suddenly stopped in his tracks when he remembers a curious habit of Romaine's in the witness box when she clenched and unclenched her right hand – a habit shared by Miss Mogson in Stepney.

Some time later he confronts Romaine with the accusation that she, a former actress, was Miss Mogson, and that the letters were fakes. Romaine confesses: she loves Vole passionately and knew that her evidence would not have been enough to save him – she had to provoke an emotional reaction in the court in favour of the accused man. Mayherne is unhappy, protesting that he could have saved the innocent man by more conventional means but Romaine tells him she couldn't have risked it. Mayherne presumes she means that was because she knew Vole was innocent; however, the story ends with Romaine telling the lawyer that she couldn't risk it because Vole was actually guilty all along. She is willing to go to gaol for perjury, but Vole is free.

=== The Mystery of the Blue Jar ===
Jack Hartington, a young man of twenty-four years of age, is something of a golf addict and consequently has taken a room at a hotel near to Stourton Heath links, so that he can practise for an hour each morning before having to take the train to his dull city job. One morning he is disturbed in mid-swing when he hears a female voice crying out "Murder! Help! Murder!". Running in the direction of the cry he comes across a quaint cottage, outside of which is a young girl quietly gardening. When questioned, she denies hearing the call for help and seems surprised at Jack's story, referring to him as "Monsieur".

Confused, he leaves her and hunts in the surrounding area for the source of the cry, but in the end gives up. That evening, he looks through the papers to see if any crime has been reported, and repeats this action the next morning – a day of heavy rain which cancels his practise routine – but still finds nothing. The next day, the strange occurrence of two days earlier is repeated at the same spot and the exact time. Also, once more the girl outside the cottage denies hearing any such sound, and sympathetically enquires if Jack has suffered from shellshock in the past.

The third day, he hears the cry again but this time doesn't let on to the girl that this is the case when he passes the cottage, and instead they discuss her gardening. Nevertheless, he is intensely troubled by these occurrences and notices that at the hotel breakfast table he is being watched by a bearded man whom he knows to be called Dr Lavington. Concerned that his sanity is under attack, Jack invites Lavington to join him for a few holes the next morning and the doctor agrees. When the cry is repeated Lavington denies hearing anything. The doctor discusses Jack's possible delusions and they talk of the possibility of some sort of psychic phenomena. He suggests that Jack go off to work as usual while he investigates the history of the cottage.

Back at the hotel that night, the doctor tells him what he has learnt. The present occupants, who have been in situ for just ten days, are an elderly French professor with consumption and his daughter. However, a year ago, and several tenants back, the occupants were a strange couple called Turner who seemed to be afraid of something. They suddenly vacated the premises early one morning. Mr Turner has been seen since then, but no one seems to have laid eyes on his wife. The doctor, although arguing against jumping to conclusions, theorises that Jack is receiving some sort of message from the woman.

A few days later, Jack receives a visit from the girl at the cottage who introduces herself as Felise Marchaud. She is in terror as, knowing of local gossip that the cottage is haunted, she has started to have a recurring dream of a distressed woman holding a blue jar. The last two night's dreams ended with a voice crying out in the same way as Jack heard on the links. Jack brings Lavington into the discussion and Felise shows them both a rough watercolour she found in the house of a woman holding a blue jar, as in her dream. Jack recognises it as similar to a Chinese one bought by his uncle two months ago, which coincides with the date on which one of the previous tenants left the cottage. Lavington suggests bringing the jar to the cottage, where the three of them will sit with it for the night and see what happens. As Jack's uncle is away he is able to obtain the jar and bring it as requested, and Felise recognises it as the one from the dream. Lavington switches off the lights in the sitting-room and the three of them sit in the darkness at a table on which the jar is placed. After waiting for some time, Jack suddenly starts to choke and falls unconscious.

He wakes up in a copse near the cottage, in daylight, to find out from his pocket watch that it is half-past-twelve in the afternoon. He gets no answer at the cottage and goes back to the hotel, where he finds his uncle, newly arrived back from a continental trip. Jack tells him of the events, prompting a cry of outrage from the old man: the blue Chinese jar was a priceless Ming piece and the only one of its kind in the world. Jack rushes to the hotel office and finds that Lavington has checked out, but has left a mocking note for Jack from himself, Felise, and her invalid father, saying that their twelve hours start ought to be ample.

=== The Strange Case of Sir Arthur Carmichael ===
Dr Edward Carstairs, a noted psychologist, is called in to investigate the case of Sir Arthur Carmichael, a young man of twenty-three who woke up the previous morning at his estate in Herefordshire with a totally changed personality. Carstairs travels down there with a colleague called Dr Settle, who tells him that he feels that the house could be haunted, and that this phenomenon has connections with the case. The household consists of Sir Arthur, his stepmother, Lady Carmichael, his half-brother of eight years of age, and a Miss Phyllis Patterson to whom Arthur is engaged to be married. As their horse carriage comes up the drive, they see Miss Patterson walking across the lawn. Carstairs remarks on the cat at her feet, which provokes a startled reaction from Settle.

Going into the house, they make the acquaintance of Lady Carmichael and Miss Patterson, and again Carstairs causes a reaction when he mentions seeing the cat. They then see their patient and observe his strange behaviour – sitting hunched, without speaking, then stretching and yawning and drinking a cup of milk without using his hands.

After dinner that night, Carstairs hears a cat meowing, and this sound is repeated during the night outside his bedroom door, but he is unable to find the animal in the house. The next morning he does spy the cat from the bedroom window as it walks across the lawn and straight through a flock of birds which seem oblivious to its presence. He is further puzzled when Lady Carmichael insists that there is no cat in their home. Talking to a footman, Carstairs is informed that there used to be a cat, but it was destroyed a week ago and buried in the grounds. There are further appearances of this apparition, and they realise that it is targeting Lady Carmichael. Carstairs even dreams of the cat the following night: in the dream, he follows it into the library and it shows him to a gap in the volumes on the bookshelf. The next morning, Carstairs and Settle find that there is a book missing from that very spot in the room, and Carstairs glimpses the truth later on in the day when Sir Arthur jumps off his chair when he spots a mouse, and crouches near the wainscoting, waiting for it to appear.

That night, Lady Carmichael is badly attacked in her bed by the ghostly creature, and this prompts Carstairs to insist that the body of the dead cat be dug up. It is, and he sees that it is the very creature that he has spotted several times, and a smell shows that it was killed by prussic acid.

Several days pass, as Lady Carmichael starts to recover, until one day Sir Arthur falls into the water of the lake. Pulled out onto the bank, he is at first thought to be dead, but he comes round and he has also recovered his personality, but he has no recollection of the intervening days. The sight of him gives Lady Carmichael such a shock that she dies on the spot, and the missing book from the library is found – a volume on the subject of the transformation of people into animals. The inference is that lady Carmichael used the book to put Sir Arthur's soul into the cat, then killed it to ensure that her own son would inherit the title and estate. As stated at the beginning of the story, Carstairs later died, and his notes containing the details of the case were subsequently found.

=== The Call of Wings ===
Millionaire Silas Hamer and East-End Parson Dick Borrow, after having dinner with their friend Bertrand Seldon, discuss how they are completely opposite in nature, yet both contentedly happy. Hamer is economically happy because he has risen from his poverty-ridden background and built up a fortune, whereas Borrow is spiritually happy because he aids the poor. The two go their separate ways home, and on his way Silas witnesses a homeless man being hit by a bus and killed. Thinking he could have saved the man, Silas goes home mentally troubled.

Before he goes through his front door, he hears a legless piper playing a tune that he feels lifts him off the ground in joy. Having heard this tune for several days before falling asleep, he thinks that he floats around his bedroom with joy, witnessing amazing scenes of red sand, and a completely new colour that he nicknames Wing Colour. However, every time something pulls him back to the ground, causing him physical pain. He talks to his friend Seldon about it, to which the nerve-specialist replies he should talk to the piper and ask about the music.

Silas confronts the piper, and demands to know who he is. In response, the piper draws a picture of the faun god Pan (who has goat's legs) playing his pipes on a rock, and saying "They were evil", implying that the piper is the god Pan, who had his legs cut off to appear human. Now addicted to the music, Silas feels that his wealth is the only thing stopping him from reaching true happiness. In response, he donates all of his money to Dick Borrow, so that he can help the whole of East London. Deciding to get the train home, Silas waits on the platform with a homeless man. The man, in a drunken stupor, walks to the edge and accidentally falls off as the train is about to arrive. Remembering the man hit by a bus, Silas pulls the man off the tracks and throws him onto the platform, himself falling onto the tracks in the process. Before he is killed, he briefly hears a piper playing.

=== The Last Seance ===
Raoul Daubreuil is a man in France, who is in love with Simone, a medium who has been wearied over the years by all the seances which she has performed. They live in a flat, together with their servant Elise. Of all the seances, the strangest were those performed for Madame Exe, a woman who lost her daughter Amelie. In these seances, Amelie's materialisations have been very clear and accurate. However, this day is the day on which she will perform her last seance, and it is for Madame Exe. Arriving in their flat, Raoul comforts Simone and, despite her initial refusal to perform the seance, he convinces her to do it. She is further convinced when Madame Exe arrives, and reminds her of her promise. Upon arriving in the room where the seance will take place, Madame Exe states that she wants to make sure that the last seance is not a scam, and asks to tie Raoul to a chair. He agrees, but tells Madame Exe that the materialisation must not be touched at all, in case Simone is harmed. Madame Exe reluctantly agrees.

Simone hides behind a curtain for the seance, and the materialisation of Amelie starts to form from a mist. This materialisation is the most vivid of them all, causing great surprise to Raoul and Madame Exe. However, Madame Exe rushes towards the materialisation and hugs it, causing Simone to scream in pain. Raoul shouts at Madame Exe to stop touching the materialisation, but instead she picks up the ghostly form of Amelie and runs off with it, wanting Amelie to be hers forever. As Raoul attempts to untie his bonds, Simone shrivels and dies. After Raoul unties himself, the tragedy ends with Elise and Raoul crying over the bloodstained corpse of Simone.

=== SOS ===
The Dinsmead family, mother Maggie, father, son Johnnie and daughters Charlotte and Magdalen, are about to eat supper with cups of tea, when they hear a rap the door.

Mortimer Cleveland, an authority in mental science, finds himself stranded in the bare Wiltshire downs in the driving rain after a second car tyre puncture within ten minutes of each other. He spots a light in the distance and makes his way to the house of the Dinsmead family. They invite him in, offering freshly made tea and viands. The family seem hospitable but Cleveland feels something is not right. Maggie seems afraid. The two daughters are both pretty, but look nothing alike. The daughters are sent upstairs to prepare the room for Cleveland; when he retires he notices the table by his bed is smothered in dust. Written in the dust are three clearly visible letters "SOS", confirming his suspicions.

The next day Cleveland asks Charlotte if she wrote the SOS in his room. She did not, though she feels frightened of the house. Her parents and Magdalen all seem different. Cleveland believes his arriving has upset the family and caused tension. He can understand Charlotte's unease due to her psychic connection, but not that of the others.

Johnnie comes into the house, fingers stained, and sits down to breakfast. Cleveland glances at the stained hands. Johnnie explains that he is always messing about with chemicals, much to his father's dismay. His father wants him to go in to building. Mr Dinsmead smiles, yet Cleveland's distrust of the father grows. Again Maggie appears afraid of her husband. Magdalen seems disappointed when Cleveland says that he slept well.

Cleveland does not want to leave but has no reason to prolong his stay. As he walks past the kitchen window, he hears Mr Dinsmead say "it's a fair lump of money, it is". He cannot hear Maggie's reply. Mr Dinsmead adds, "nigh on £60,000, the lawyer said". Not wanting to eavesdrop, Cleveland makes his way back into the house. That amount of money makes things clearer and uglier.

Mr Dinsmead chats with Cleveland about leaving. Cleveland mentions how the two daughters look nothing alike. In a flash of intuition, Cleveland remarks that they are not both Dinsmead's daughters by birth. Dinsmead admits that one is a foundling. She is unaware of this, but will soon have to know. Cleveland surmises that it must be due to an inheritance. Mr Dinsmead says that they took the child in to help the mother for a consideration. Recently he noticed an advertisement regarding a child whom he strongly believed was Magdalen. He will take Magdalen to London next week. Magdalen's father was a wealthy man who had learned of his daughter shortly prior to his death. His money was left to her. Cleveland believes Dinsmead, yet thinks that there is more to the tale.

Cleveland thanks Mrs Dinsmead for her hospitality. She drops a miniature of Charlotte made in the style of 25 years earlier. Cleveland notices her look of fear. He does not ask her about the girls. He leaves the house. At about 0.5 mi (0.80 km) down the road, Magdalen appears. She wants to speak with Cleveland. She wrote SOS in the dust, feeling uneasy about the house. Mr and Mrs Dinsmead and Charlotte are different. Johnny is untouched by it all. Magdalen knew everyone was afraid without knowing why. Being a practical person, she does not believe in spirits. Cleveland believes that he can figure out what is wrong, but needs time to think it through. He sends Magdalen home.

His thoughts come back to Johnny. Cleveland remembers Maggie dropping her cup at breakfast, when Johnnie mentioned his interest in chemistry. Mr Dinsmead did not sip his tea. Charlotte arrested her cup the previous evening. Though the tea was hot, Mr Dinsmead emptied the cups and claimed that it was cold. Cleveland recalls reading a paper about a whole family being poisoned by a lad's carelessness. A packet of arsenic left in the larder had dripped through on the bread below. It is possible that Mr Dinsmead read the same paper. Cleveland rises to his feet and heads for the cottage.

The Dinsmead family are again sitting down for supper of tinned of brawn and tea. Cleveland enters as Maggie pours the tea. Cleveland swiftly takes a test tube from his pocket and pours some tea from a cup into it. Mr Dinsmead demands to know what Cleveland is doing. Cleveland is certain that this is a case of poisoning meant to look accidental, with just one person not recovering. Johnnie would be blamed for carelessness. Cleveland puts tea from a second cup in a second test tube, labelling each: red for Charlotte's cup and blue from Magdalen's cup. Cleveland prophesies that Charlotte's cup will contain 4-5 times more poison than Magdalen's.

Cleveland realises that Magdalen is their daughter and that Charlotte is the adopted child. The father planned for Magdalen to inherit. Arsenic in Charlotte's tea was meant to kill her. Maggie cackles "tea, that's what he said not lemonade".

Magdalen implores Cleveland out of earshot of the others not to divulge this secret. Cleveland says he will keep the phials to safeguard Charlotte now and in the future.

== Literary significance and reception ==
As this book was not published through the usual channels or available to buy in shops until 1936, there were no reviews of the original publication.

Robert Barnard: "Mostly semi-supernatural stories. In this setting, 'Witness for the Prosecution' stands out as the jewel it is: surely this is the cleverest short story she wrote. Of the others, the best is perhaps The Call of Wings, but that, depressingly, was one of the very first things she wrote (pre-First World War). In this mode she got no better."

== Publication history ==
- 1933, Odhams Press, October 1933, Hardcover, 247 pp
- 1936, Collins Crime Club (London), February 1936, Hardcover, 247 pp
- 1960, Pan Books, Paperback (Great Pan G377), 218 pp
- 1964, Fontana Books (Imprint of HarperCollins), Paperback, 190 pp
- 1968, Ulverscroft Large Print Edition, Hardcover, 218pp, ISBN 0-7089-0187-5
- 2010, HarperCollins; Facsimile edition, Hardcover: 256 pages, ISBN 978-0-00-735465-8

=== First publication of stories ===
The first UK magazine publication of all the stories has not been fully documented. A partial listing is as follows:

- The Red Signal: First published in issue 232 of The Grand Magazine in June 1924.
- The Fourth Man: First published in issue 250 of The Grand Magazine in December 1925.
- Wireless: First published in the Sunday Chronicle Annual in December 1926.
- The Mystery of the Blue Jar: First published in issue 233 of The Grand Magazine in July 1924.
- The Last Seance: First published under the title of The Stolen Ghost in issue 87 of The Sovereign Magazine in March 1927. The illustrator of the story was not named.
- SOS: First published in issue 252 of The Grand Magazine in February 1926.

In addition to the above, in the US The Witness for the Prosecution was published in the 31 January 1925 issue of Flynn's Weekly (Volume IV, No 2), under the title of Traitor Hands, with an uncredited illustration; and the first true printing of The Last Seance also occurred in the US when it was published in the November 1926 issue of Ghost Stories under the title of The Woman Who Stole a Ghost.

No magazine printings of the remaining stories prior to 1933 have yet been traced.

=== Publication of book collection ===
The book was not available to buy in the shops but only through coupons collected from The Passing Show, a weekly magazine published by Odhams. The coupons appeared in issues 81 to 83, published from 7 to 21 October 1933, as part of a promotional relaunch of the magazine. In exchange for the coupons and seven shillings (7/-), customers could receive one of six books. The other five books to choose from were Jungle Girl by Edgar Rice Burroughs, The Sun Will Shine by May Edginton, The Veil'd Delight by Marjorie Bowen, The Venner Crime by John Rhode and Q33 by George Goodchild. The promotion appears to have been successful, insofar as The Hound of Death is by far the easiest pre-war UK Christie book to obtain as a first edition in its dustwrapper. An edition for sale in the shops appeared in February 1936, published by the Collins Crime Club.

=== US book appearances of stories ===
The stories contained in The Hound of Death appeared in the following US collections:

- The Witness for the Prosecution and Other Stories (1948) – The Fourth Man, The Mystery of the Blue Jar, The Red Signal, S O S, Wireless (under the revised title of Where There's a Will) and The Witness for the Prosecution.
- Double Sin and Other Stories (1961) – The Last Seance.
- The Golden Ball and Other Stories (1971) – The Hound of Death, The Gypsy, The Lamp, The Strange Case of Sir Arthur Carmichael (under the slightly revised title of The Strange Case of Sir Andrew Carmichael) and The Call of Wings

== Adaptations ==
=== The Witness for the Prosecution ===
The story "The Witness for the Prosecution" has been widely adapted, including a theatrical movie, six television movies, and a number of stage plays.

=== The Red Signal ===
- Episode of the CBS television series Suspense. It aired on 22 January 1952.
- Episode 8 of the Thames Television series The Agatha Christie Hour (1982), which featured ten one-off plays from short stories by the writer (see The Listerdale Mystery and Parker Pyne Investigates for other episodes in the series).

=== The Fourth Man ===
- Episode 4 of the Thames Television series The Agatha Christie Hour (1982).

=== The Mystery of the Blue Jar ===
- Episode 7 of the Thames Television series The Agatha Christie Hour (1982).
