= Witness for the Prosecution (play) =

1953 play by Agatha Christie

- Programme cover original production
- Original language: English
- Written by: Agatha Christie

Premiere
- Date: 28 September 1953
- Place: Winter Garden Theatre; London

Witness for the Prosecution is a play adapted by Agatha Christie from her 1925 short story "Traitor's Hands". The play opened in London on 28 October 1953 at the Winter Garden Theatre (although the first performance had been in Nottingham on 28 September). It was produced by Sir Peter Saunders.

== Reception of London production ==
The Times of 29 October 1953 was enthusiastic in its praise stating, "The author has two ends in view, and she attains them both. She takes us now into the Old Bailey during an exciting trial for murder, now into chambers where the human reactions of the lawyers engaged in the case may be studied; and when the trial is over and there seems no more to be said, she swiftly ravels again the skein which the law has confidently unravelled and leaves herself with a denouement which is at once surprising and credible." The reviewer outlined the basics of the plot, commenting that Patricia Jessel's performance in the witness box was "cold-blooded" and that she "makes a clear-cut image of hatred releasing itself suddenly from inhibitions which have become intolerable" and that Derek Blomfield was "equally good". The greatest praise was reserved for the climax: "Mrs Christie has by this time got the audience in her pocket. A timely intervention of a woman of the streets offering new evidence seems precisely what the trial needs and when it is resumed the evidence brings it triumphantly to a satisfying conclusion. It is only then that the accomplished thriller writer shows her real hand."

Ivor Brown of The Observer said in the issue of 1 November 1953 that the play had, "all the usual advantages of Counsel in conflict, agonised outbreak in the dock, and back-answers from the witness-box. To these are added a considerable and ingenious appendix; the jury's verdict is only the beginning of a story that has as many twists as a pigtail." He summed up with a comment on the performance of Patricia Jessel, who "takes the title-part with cool efficiency. Whether she is snake in the grass or butterfly on the wheel playgoers must find out for themselves. There will be plenty doing that."

Philip Hope-Wallace in The Guardian's issue of 30 October 1953 said of the ending, "Justice has been done and has been seen to be done. We nod approvingly, at which moment Mrs Christie says in effect "Oh, so you thought that did you?" and with an unforeseen twist of the cards lets us see how wrong we were. This is satisfying, but it makes criticism almost impossible; first, one must not give away the clue and second, one must reconsider whether those witnesses who seemed the most plausible were not, in fact, less good players than those who seemed somehow not quite 'in character'." Nevertheless, Hope-Wallace did admit that the opening night was "a great success" and stated that the play presented a "well-made, humorous, exciting case".

=== Credits of London production ===
- Director: Wallace Douglas
- Cast:
- Rosalie Westwater as Greta, typist to Sir Wilfrid
- Walter Horsbrugh as Carter, Sir Wilfrid's Chief Clerk/Alderman
- Milton Rosmer as Mr Mayhew, a solicitor
- Derek Blomfield as Leonard Vole
- David Horne as Sir Wilfrid Robarts, QC
- David Raven as Inspector Hearne
- Kenn Kennedy as Plain-Clothes Detective/Third Member of the Jury
- Patricia Jessel as Romaine
- Philip Holles as Clerk of the Court
- Percy Marmont as Mr Justice Wainright
- D. A. Clarke-Smith as Mr Myers, QC
- Nicolas Tannar as Court Usher
- John Bryning as Court Stenographer
- Denzil Ellis as Warder
- Muir Little as The Judge's Clerk
- George Dudley as First Barrister
- Jack Bulloch as Second Barrister
- Lionel Gadsen as Third Barrister
- John Farries Moss as Fourth Barrister
- Richard Coke as Fifth Barrister
- Agnes Fraser as Sixth Barrister
- Lauderdale Beckett as First Member of the Jury
- Iris Fraser Foss as Second Member of the Jury
- David Homewood as a Policeman
- Graham Stuart as Dr. Wyatt, a Police Surgeon
- Jean Stewart as Janet MacKenzie
- Peter Franklin as Mr. Clegg, a laboratory assistant
- Rosemary Wallace as The Other Woman

The cast list, to preserve the surprise ending in the final scene, lists one character simply as "The Other Woman". Until that final scene audiences are meant to believe that "The Other Woman" refers to an appearance by Romaine in disguise. This is to hide the appearance of the "other" Other Woman in the closing moments. In 1995 Mystery Writers of America included the play in their list of The Top 100 Mystery Novels of All Time.

== Broadway production ==
The play opened in the United States at Henry Miller's Theatre, New York City on 16 December 1954. It was produced by Gilbert Miller and Peter Saunders. Patricia Jessel was the only member of the cast to transfer from the London production.The Times reported on the success of the production in its issue of 23 December 1954 when they quoted a review in the New York Herald Tribune which said that the play should be, "A walloping success. The finish is done with such dedicated conviction, such patent plausibility, such respect for the medium as a thing of beauty that you are apt to find yourself gasping out loud."

Jessel and Francis L. Sullivan both won Tony Awards for their roles, and Christie won an Edgar Award from the Mystery Writers of America for Best Mystery Play. The play ran for 645 performances, closing on 30 June 1956.

=== Credits of Broadway production ===
- Director: Robert Lewis
- Cast:
- Gordon Nelson as Carter
- Mary Barclay as Greta
- Francis L. Sullivan as Sir Wilfred Robarts, Q.C.
- Robin Craven as Mr Mayhew, a solicitor
- Gene Lyons as Leonard Vole
- Claude Horton as Inspector Hearne
- Ralph Leonard as Plain-Clothes Detective
- Patricia Jessel as Romaine
- Dolores Rashid as Third Juror
- Andrew George as Second Juror
- Jack Bittner as Foreman of the Jury
- Arthur Oshlag as Court Usher
- Ronald Dawson as Clerk of the Court
- Ernest Clark as Mr Myers, QC
- Horace Braham as Mr Justice Wainwright
- R. Cobden-Smith as Alderman
- Harold Webster as Judge's Clerk
- W. H. Thomas as Court Stenographer
- Ralph Roberts as Warder
- Henry Craig Nelson as Barrister
- Brace Conning as Barrister
- Ruth Greene as Barrister
- Albert Richards as Barrister
- Franklyn Monroe as Barrister
- Sam Kramer as Barrister
- Bryan Herbert as Policeman
- Guy Spaull as Dr Wyatt
- Una O'Connor as Janet MacKenzie
- Michael McAloney as Mr Clegg
- Dawn Steinkamp (pseudonym) as The Other Woman

== Publication and further adaptations ==
The play was first published in the UK in Famous Plays of 1954 by Victor Gollancz Ltd in 1954. The first printing in the US was in the same year in a paperback edition by Samuel French Ltd. French also published the play in the UK in 1957 as French's Acting Edition No 648 priced at five shillings. It was reprinted in hardback for the US market in The Mousetrap and Other Plays by G. P. Putnam's Sons in 1978 (ISBN 0-396-07631-9) and in the UK by HarperCollins in 1993 (ISBN 0-00-224344-X).

The very first performance of the story, just pre-dating the debut of Christie's play, was in the form of a live telecast which aired on CBS Television's Lux Video Theatre on 17 September 1953 and which starred Edward G. Robinson (making his television debut), Andrea King, and Tom Drake.

The film version, based on Christie's play, was released on 6 February 1958 and directed by Billy Wilder. Charles Laughton played Sir Wilfred, Marlene Dietrich played Romaine (renamed Christine) and Tyrone Power played Leonard Vole in his second to last role. A character not in the play, Sir Wilfred's nurse, Miss Plimsoll, was created for the film and played by Laughton's wife, Elsa Lanchester. Una O'Connor who had played Janet MacKenzie, the housekeeper of the murder victim, on the New York stage, reprised her role in the film. Laughton and Lanchester were nominated for Academy Awards.

A 1982 adaptation was made for television with Sir Ralph Richardson, Deborah Kerr, Beau Bridges, Donald Pleasence, Dame Wendy Hiller and Diana Rigg. It was adapted by Lawrence B. Marcus and John Gay from the original screenplay and directed by Alan Gibson.

== Theatre Mill – 2014 production ==
In April 2014, the first ever site-specific production of the play opened at York Guildhall from York-based company, Theatre Mill, and was fully supported by Agatha Christie Ltd. To celebrate the world premiere, there was a Q&A with the director and cast following the opening night performance. According to reports, it was always Christie's wish to see the play in a site-specific location. The production was staged in the city's council chambers (using most of the building and played in-the-round) and was directed by Samuel Wood. The cast included: David Bowen, Rachel Logan, Andrew Dowbiggin, Adam Elms, and Clive Moore. It received very positive reviews.

== 2015 revival ==
Theatre Mill's production was revived at the York Guildhall from June 2015 before transferring to Leeds Civic Hall, again garnering extremely positive reviews. Logan, Elms, and Moore reprised their roles and were joined by Gordon Kane and Niall Costigan.

== London County Hall production – 2017 to present ==
In October 2017, a staging of the play opened at London County Hall to critical acclaim. Performances were suspended in March 2020 due to the COVID-19 pandemic in the United Kingdom, and resumed in September 2021. Initially booking to April 2027, the production was extended in September 2026 to 19 September 2027, taking it into a tenth year at County Hall. Its sixteenth company took over on 22 September 2026, with Matthew McGivern as Leonard Vole and Sophie Craig as Romaine, both in their West End debuts, and Jo Stone-Fewings returning as Sir Wilfrid Robarts. Produced by Eleanor Lloyd Productions and Rebecca Stafford Productions this site-specific production is set in the magnificent surroundings of the chamber inside the historic London County Hall.

=== Credits of County Hall, London production ===
- Director: Lucy Bailey
- Designer: William Dudley
- Lighting Designer: Chris Davey
- Sound Designer: Mic Pool
- Casting Director: Ellie Collyer-Bristow CDG

== Awards and nominations ==
=== Original Broadway production ===
| Year | Award | Category | Nominee | Result |
|---|---|---|---|---|
| 1955 | Tony Award | Best Featured Actor in a Play | Francis L. Sullivan | Won |
| 1955 | Tony Award | Best Featured Actress in a Play | Patricia Jessel | Won |
