= The Flesh Is Weak =

1957 British film by Don Chaffey

- Directed by: Don Chaffey
- Screenplay by: Leigh Vance; Roger Falconer
- Story by: Deborah Bedford
- Produced by: Raymond Stross
- Starring: John Derek; Milly Vitale; Freda Jackson
- Cinematography: Stephen Dade
- Music by: Tristram Cary
- Production company: Raymond Stross Productions
- Distributed by: Eros Films; Distributors Corporation of America (US)
- Release date: 6 August 1957
- Running time: 88 minutes
- Country: United Kingdom
- Language: English

The Flesh Is Weak is a 1957 British film directed by Don Chaffey and starring John Derek and Milly Vitale. It was written by Leigh Vance and Roger Falconer based on an original story by Deborah Bedford. Distributors Corporation of America released the film in the USA as a double feature with Blonde in Bondage (1957).

== Plot ==
Tony Giani is a Soho pimp who preys on young provincial women who come to London seeking work. Marissa Cooper, one such girl, has just arrived in London. Giani spots her and offers her a job in the Golden Bucket, a nightclub. In her innocence, she does not realise the club is a front for prostitution. When she tries to escape from the pimp's control, she is set up by Giani and his brother Angelo and arrested by the police. Investigative journalist Lloyd Buxton persuades her to give evidence against the brothers leading to their imprisonment and her freedom.

== Cast ==
- John Derek as Tony Giani
- Milly Vitale as Marissa Cooper
- William Franklyn as Lloyd Buxton
- Martin Benson as Angelo Giani
- Freda Jackson as Trixie
- Norman Wooland as Inspector Kingcombe
- Harold Lang as Henry
- Patricia Jessel as Millie
- John Paul as Sergeant Franks
- Denis Shaw as Saradine
- Joe Robinson as Lofty
- Roger Snowden as Benny
- Patricia Plunkett as Doris Newman
- Shirley Anne Field as Susan

== Production ==
The film was based on the Messina vice gang who operated in the West End of London. Its original title was Women of Night, then Not for Love, before becoming The Flesh is Weak. The success of the film enabled the producer Raymond Stross and director Don Chaffey to raise finance for A Question of Adultery (1958).

== Reception ==
=== Box office ===
The film was a box office success – according to Variety it was the fourth highest grossing film in England.

It is not listed in Kinematograph Weekly as one of the most popular British films of 1957 but the magazine said the movie was "enjoying a triumphant West End run" and "did extraodinarily well" in 1958.

=== Critical ===
The Monthly Film Bulletin wrote: "A crudely melodramatic film dealing with, but not one feels very gravely concerned about, the real life problem of organised prostitution. There is some rather loose and high flown talk regarding a change in the law and licences for the streetwalkers, but in the main the film has to do with the downfall of a Graham Greene-style boy gangster, played with appropriate menace by John Derek. The direction is brisk and there are some lively impersonations by Vera Day, Shirley Ann Field and Patricia Jessel among les girls. Also to be enjoyed is Harold Lang's droll performance as a jaundiced gang-member"

Variety wrote "It is difficult to know what producer Raymond Stross had in mind with "The Flesh is Weak ... As a social document, it makes only the mildest impact and fails lamentably to say anything new or penetrating about an urgent problem. As entertainment, it is rather mediocre stuff which likely will bore the discerning patron and sadly disappoint those in search of cheap thrills. ... Flesh is Weak could have been a searing and courageous exposure of a social sore, but it merely flirts with the subject. By compromise, it, ends up as a sordid, depressing little yarn which Don Chaffey directs competently, but without originality."

FilmInk argued Derek "actually seems to be trying here and it’s one of his best performances – the film turned out to be a sleeper hit at the British box office."
