= Witness for the Prosecution (Hallmark Hall of Fame) =

1982 television film by Alan Gibson

- Hallmark Hall of Fame episode
- Print advertisement for television production
- Episode no.: Season 32; Episode 1
- Directed by: Alan Gibson
- Written by: Agatha Christie (play); Billy Wilder; (1957 screenplay); Harry Kurnitz; (1957 screenplay); Larry Marcus (adaptation); John Gay; (written for television by)
- Based on: The Witness for the Prosecution by Agatha Christie
- Cinematography by: Arthur Ibbetson
- Editing by: Peter Boyle
- Production code: 142
- Original air date: December 4, 1982
- Running time: 101 minutes

Guest appearances
- Ralph Richardson; Diana Rigg; Deborah Kerr; Donald Pleasence; Beau Bridges; Wendy Hiller; Peter Sallis

Episode chronology
← Previous "The Hunchback of Notre Dame"	Next → "Thursday's Child"
- Hallmark Hall of Fame

Witness for the Prosecution is a 1982 American made-for-television drama film version of Agatha Christie's 1925 short story and 1953 play, and also a remake of the Billy Wilder film Witness for the Prosecution (1957).

== Plot summary ==
Sir Wilfred Robarts, a famed barrister, has just been released from the hospital in which he stayed for two months following a heart attack. Returning to his practise of law, he takes the case of Leonard Vole, an unemployed man who is accused of murdering the elderly Emily French, who had bequeathed her estate to him. Vole claims he's innocent, although all evidence points to him as the killer, but his alibi witness, his cold German wife Christine, instead of entering the court as a witness for the defense, becomes the witness for the prosecution and defiantly testifies that her husband is guilty of the murder. Sir Wilfred represents Vole but retains his suspicions regarding the accused man's icy wife.

== Cast ==
- Ralph Richardson as Sir Wilfred Robarts QC
- Deborah Kerr as Miss Plimsoll, Sir Wilfred's nurse
- Diana Rigg as Christine Heilger/Vole
- Beau Bridges as Leonard Vole
- Donald Pleasence as Myers QC, the prosecutor
- Wendy Hiller as Janet Mackenzie, Emily French's maid
- David Langton as Mayhew, Vole's solicitor
- Richard Vernon as Brogan-Moore, Sir Wilfred's colleague
- Peter Sallis as Sir Wilfred's clerk, Carter
- Michael Gough as the Judge
- Frank Mills as Chief Inspector Hearne
- Primi Townsend as Diana
- Patricia Leslie as Emily French (seen in flashbacks)

== Production ==
The film was directed by Alan Gibson, based on a teleplay by John Gay and the adaptation of Larry Marcus. The musical score was composed by John Cameron.

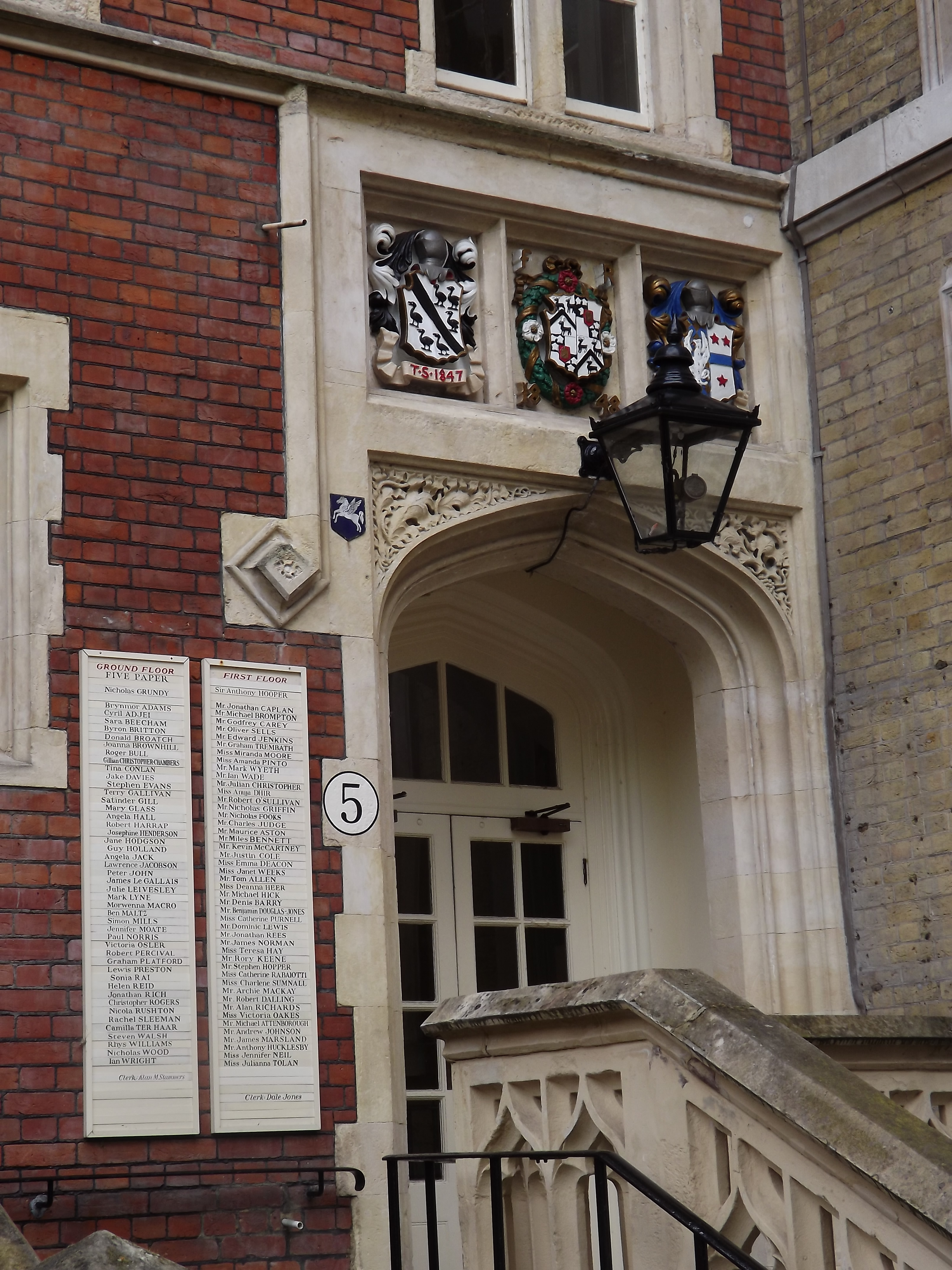
5 Paper Buildings, Inner Temple, London doubled as Sir Wilfred's chambers

The cast includes many veteran and well-known actors such as Ralph Richardson, Deborah Kerr, Diana Rigg, Donald Pleasence, Wendy Hiller, Peter Sallis and Beau Bridges. Unlike the original Billy Wilder film, the TV version stays more faithful to Christie's original short story, including the scene where Sir Wilfred meets the scarred Cockney woman in an apartment in a sleazy district of London (instead of at the railway station as in the Wilder version).

This version, also, instead of opening with Sir Wilfrid (renamed "Sir Wilfred") returning home, features an opening prologue where Janet Mackenzie returns to her employer's house, where she sees Mrs. French laughing and drinking with someone, goes upstairs and takes a pattern from her room, and hears noise from downstairs, and discovers in shock the body of Mrs. French.

This was Ralph Richardson's last appearance in films made for television, while it also was Kerr's U.S. television debut. Alan Gibson, the director of this film, also directed The Satanic Rites of Dracula, in which Richard Vernon, who plays the part of Brogan-Moore in Witness for the Prosecution, had a small role.

John Gay, the writer of the teleplay, also wrote teleplays for the Lux Video Theatre, a television anthology series. Lux Video Theatre also produced an adaptation of Witness for the Prosecution, in 1953 (four years before the Wilder version).

== Reception ==
=== Critical ===
The New York Times called it "a great deal of fun", praising the "remarkable durability" of Christie's original material, and the performances of Richardson and Rigg.

Derek Winnert gave the film three stars out of five, calling it "worthwhile for the entertaining cast and enjoyable story".

=== Awards ===
Arthur Ibbetson was nominated for an Emmy Award for outstanding cinematography for his work on the production.
