= The Mousetrap =

Murder mystery play by Agatha Christie

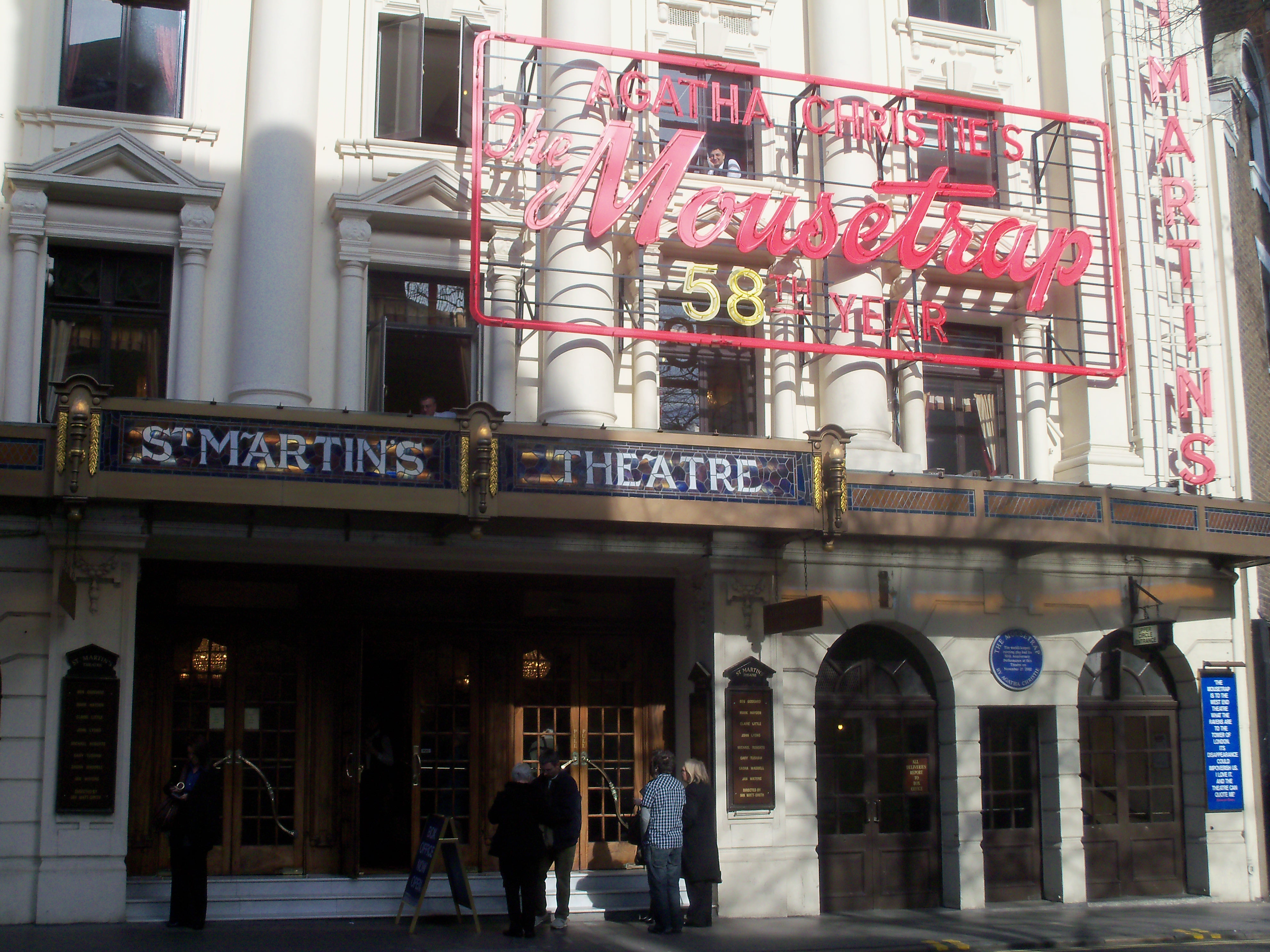
- St Martin's Theatre, London in March 2010
- Original language: English
- Written by: Agatha Christie
- Characters: Mollie Ralston; Giles Ralston; Christopher Wren; Mrs Boyle; Major Metcalf; Miss Casewell; Mr Paravicini; Detective Sergeant Trotter
- Genre: Crime fiction
- Setting: A guest house, Monkswell Manor, wintertime "in the present day"

Premiere
- Date: 6 October 1952
- Place: Theatre Royal, Nottingham
- Official website

The Mousetrap is a murder mystery play by Agatha Christie. The play opened in London's West End in 1952, and is the longest-running West End show, with over 30,000 performances, making it the longest run of any play in the world. While pandemic closures suspended performances between March 2020 and May 2021, the play has been seen by over 10 million people in London.

A whodunit, the play has a twist ending which the audience are traditionally asked not to reveal after leaving the theatre. There are eight members of the cast, and by 2012 more than 400 actors had played the roles. Richard Attenborough was the original Detective Sergeant Trotter, and his wife, Sheila Sim, the first Mollie Ralston – owner of Monkswell Manor guesthouse. Since then few of the cast have been headliners, with Stephen Moss in The Guardian writing that "the play and its author are the stars".

== History ==
The play began life as a short radio play written by Agatha Christie as a birthday present for Queen Mary, the consort of King George V. It was broadcast on 30 May 1947 under the name Three Blind Mice. The story drew from the real-life case of Dennis O'Neill, who died after he and his brother Terence suffered extreme abuse while in the foster care of a Shropshire farmer and his wife in 1945.

The play is based on a short story, itself based on the radio play, but Christie asked that the story not be published as long as it ran as a play in the West End of London. The short story has still not been published within the UK but it has appeared in the US in the 1950 collection Three Blind Mice and Other Stories.

When she wrote the play, Christie gave the rights to her grandson Mathew Prichard as a birthday present. In the United Kingdom, only one production of the play in addition to the West End production can be performed annually, and under the contract terms of the play, no film adaptation can be produced until the West End production has been closed for at least six months. Producer John Woolf bought the film rights to the play in 1956, but Woolf and his heirs have been unable to produce an adaptation because the play has never closed. Woolf's son Jonathan hired Stuart Urban to write a screenplay for an adaptation of the play in the late 1990s, but the play's producers blocked Woolf from making the film. After unsuccessfully attempting to acquire the film rights to the play, Damian Jones was inspired to produce a film more loosely based on the play. Jones' idea became the 2022 film See How They Run, a murder mystery which takes place at the West End production of The Mousetrap in 1953, in which the murder victim is a director who has been hired to direct a film adaptation of the play.

The play had to be renamed at the insistence of Emile Littler, who had produced a play called Three Blind Mice in the West End before the Second World War. The suggestion to call it The Mousetrap came from Christie's son-in-law, Anthony Hicks.

The play's longevity has ensured its popularity with tourists from around the world. In 1997, at the initiative of producer Stephen Waley-Cohen, the theatrical education charity Mousetrap Theatre Projects was launched, helping young people experience London's theatre.

Tom Stoppard's 1968 play The Real Inspector Hound parodies many elements of The Mousetrap, including the surprise ending.

== Theatrical performances ==
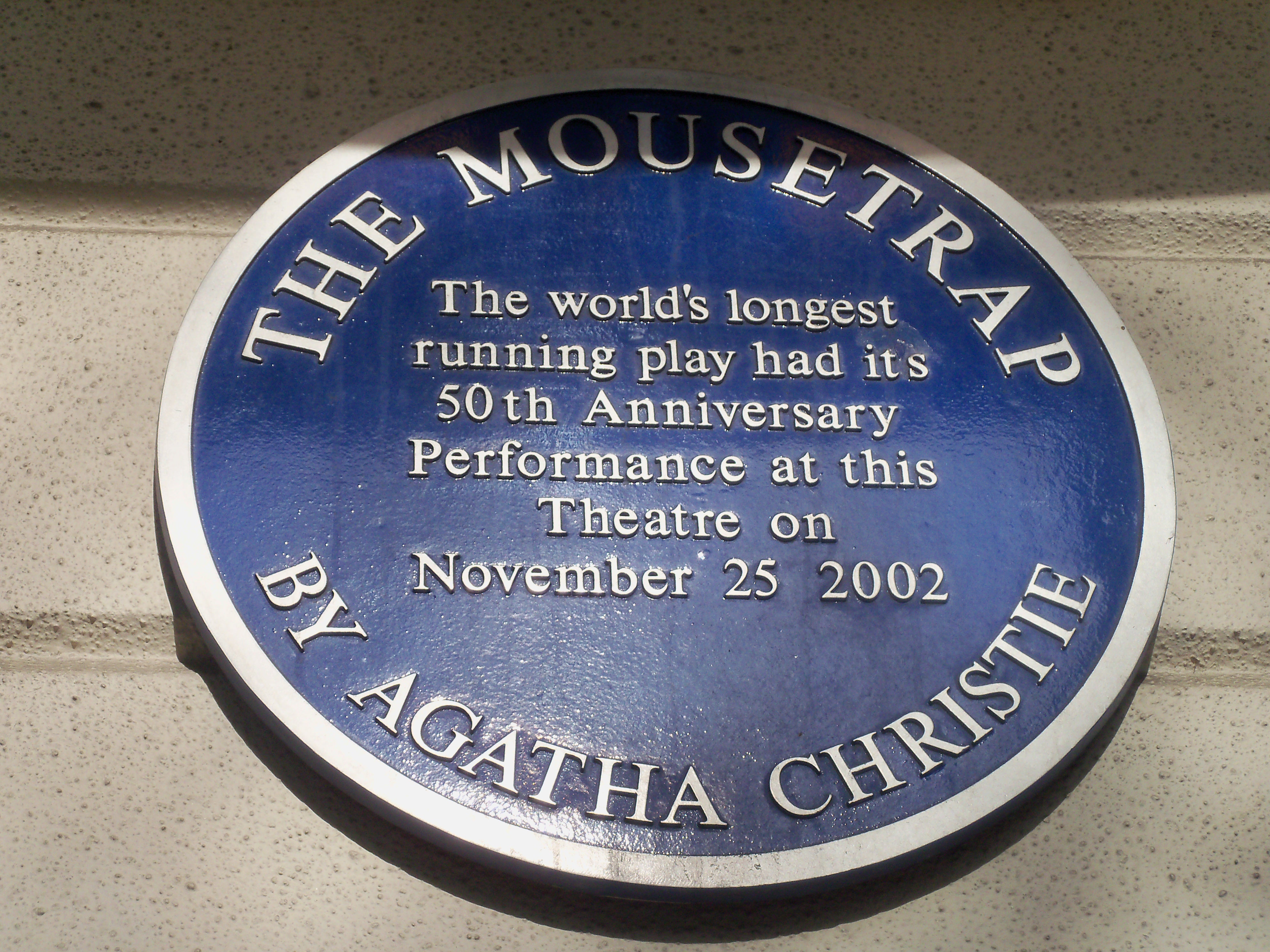
Blue plaque installed in 2002 marking the 50th anniversary of The Mousetrap on the front wall of St Martin's Theatre, London

As a stage play, The Mousetrap had its world premiere at the Theatre Royal, Nottingham, on 6 October 1952. It was originally directed by Peter Cotes, elder brother of John and Roy Boulting, the film directors. Its pre-West End tour then took it to the New Theatre Oxford, the Manchester Opera House, the Royal Court Theatre, Liverpool, the Theatre Royal, Newcastle, the Grand Theatre Leeds and the Alexandra Theatre in Birmingham, before it began its run in London on 25 November 1952 at the Ambassadors Theatre. It ran at this theatre until Saturday, 23 March 1974 when it immediately transferred to the larger St Martin's Theatre, next door, where it reopened on Monday, 25 March, thus keeping its "initial run" status. The London run has now exceeded 30,000 performances. David Turner was the director of the play from 1987 to 2004.

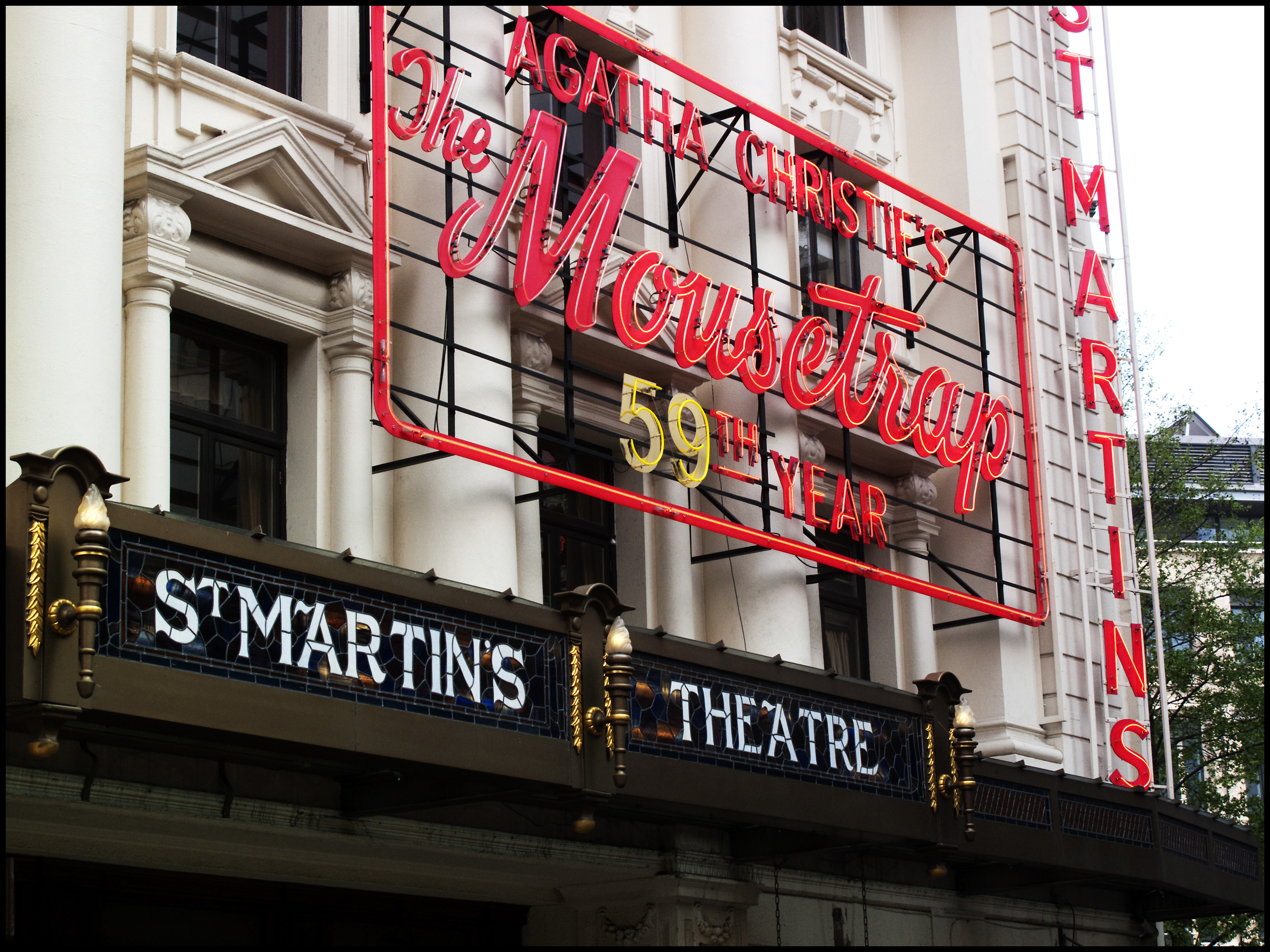
The Mousetrap sign outside the theatre, signifying its 59th year in 2011

Christie herself did not expect The Mousetrap to run for such a long time. In her autobiography, she reports a conversation that she had with Peter Saunders: "Fourteen months I am going to give it", says Saunders. To which Christie replies, "It won't run that long. Eight months perhaps. Yes, I think eight months." When it broke the record for the longest run of a play in the West End in September 1957, Christie received a mildly grudging telegram from fellow playwright Noël Coward: "Much as it pains me I really must congratulate you ..." In 2011 (by which time The Mousetrap had been running for almost 59 years), this long-lost document was found by a Cotswold furniture maker who was renovating a bureau purchased by a client from the Christie estate. By the time of Christie's death in 1976, the play had made more than £3 million. Prichard, who was only nine when he was given the copyright of the play, set up the Colwinston Charitable Trust in 1995 to use the money from productions of the play. The trust supports charities for the arts, mainly in Wales.

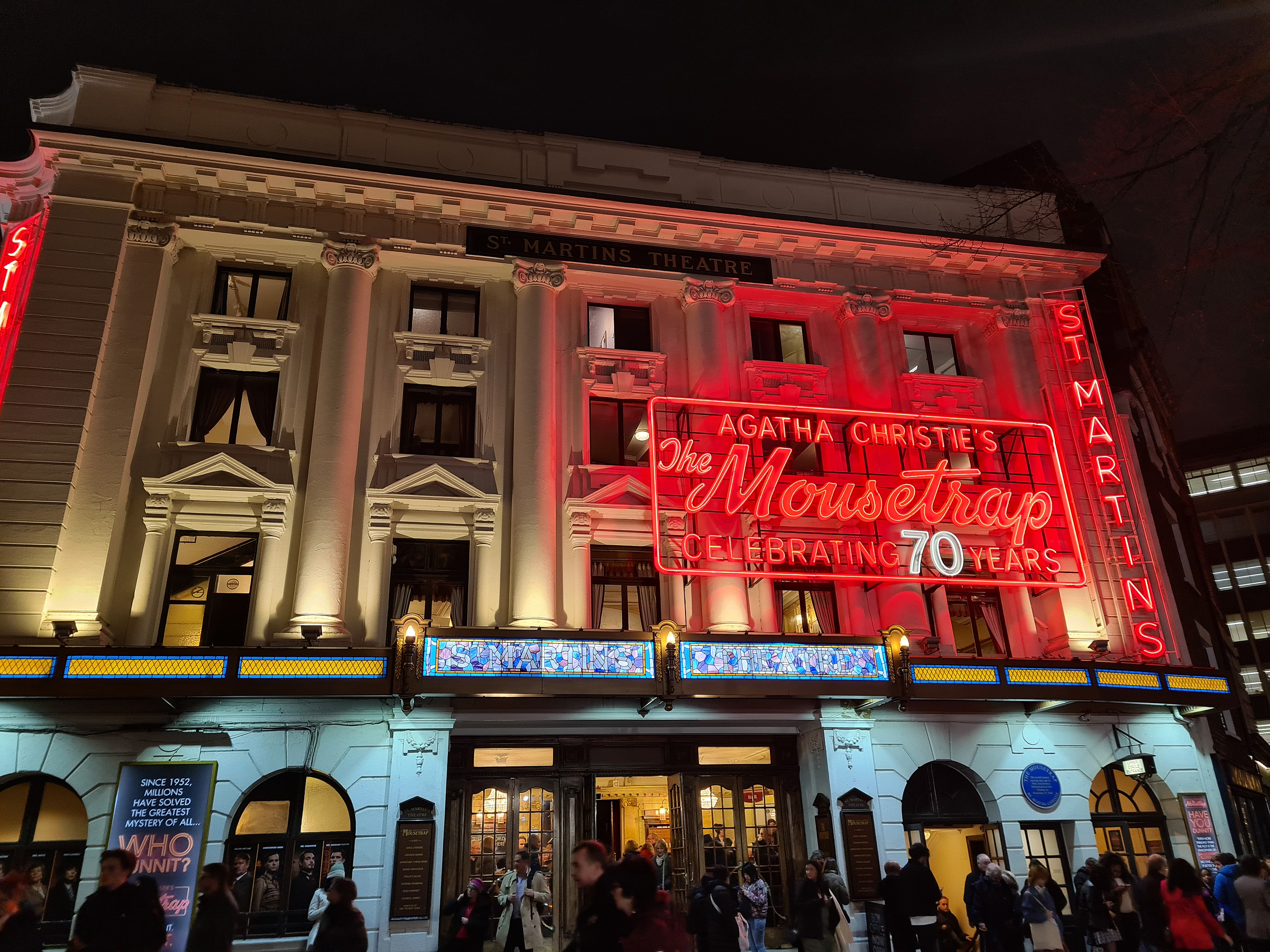
The Mousetrap marking its 70th year in 2023

The original West End cast included Richard Attenborough as Detective Sergeant Trotter and his wife Sheila Sim as Mollie Ralston. They took a 10% profit-participation in the production, which was paid for out of their combined weekly salary ("It proved to be the wisest business decision I've ever made ... but foolishly I sold some of my share to open a short-lived Mayfair restaurant called 'The Little Elephant' and later still, disposed of the remainder in order to keep Gandhi afloat.").

Since the retirement of Mysie Monte and David Raven, who each remained in the cast for more than 11 years as Mrs Boyle and Major Metcalf, the cast has been changed annually. The change usually occurs around late November around the anniversary of the play's opening, and was the initiative of Sir Peter Saunders, the original producer. There is a tradition of the retiring leading lady and the new leading lady cutting a "Mousetrap cake" together.

The late Deryck Guyler can still be heard, via a recording, reading the radio news bulletin in the play. The set was changed in 1965 and 1999, but one prop survives from the original opening – the clock which sits on the mantelpiece of the fireplace in the main hall.

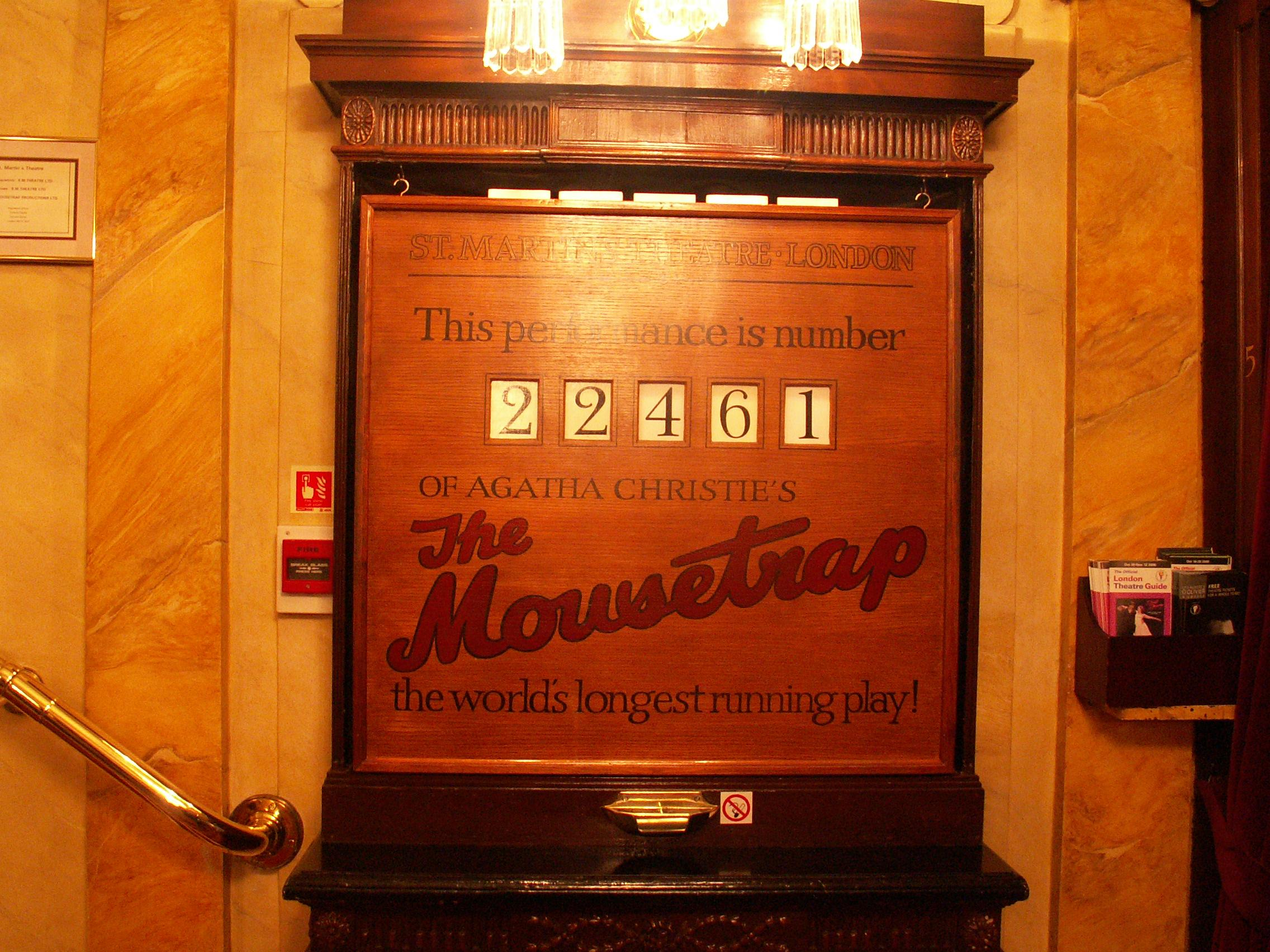
The wooden counter in the foyer of St Martin's Theatre showing 22,461 performances of The Mousetrap (pictured in November 2006). Audience members often get their photo taken next to it.

Notable milestones in the play's history include:

- 6 October 1952 – First performance at the Theatre Royal, Nottingham
- 25 November 1952 – First West End performance at the Ambassadors Theatre
- 22 April 1955 – 1,000th performance
- 13 September 1957 – Longest-ever run of a "straight" play in the West End
- 12 April 1958 – Longest-ever run of a show in the West End with 2,239 performances (the previous holder was Chu Chin Chow)
- 9 December 1964 – 5,000th performance
- 23 March 1974 – Final performance at the Ambassadors Theatre
- 25 March 1974 – The play transfers to the St Martin's Theatre
- 17 December 1976 – 10,000th performance
- 16 December 2000 – 20,000th performance
- 25 November 2002 – 50th anniversary; a special performance was attended by Queen Elizabeth II and Prince Philip, Duke of Edinburgh.
- 18 November 2012 – 25,000th performance; starred Patrick Stewart, Julie Walters, Hugh Bonneville and Iain Glen.
- 19 March 2025 – 30,000th performance

In May 2001, during the London production's 49th year, and to mark the 25th anniversary of Christie's death, the cast gave a semi-staged Sunday performance at the Palace Theatre, Westcliff-on-Sea as a guest contribution to the Agatha Christie Theatre Festival 2001, a 12-week cycle of all of Christie's plays presented by Roy Marsden's New Palace Theatre Company.

Performances at the St. Martin's Theatre were halted on 16 March 2020, along with all other West End shows, during the COVID-19 pandemic in the United Kingdom. The Mousetrap re-opened on 17 May 2021 after 14 months without performances.

In 2025 the production received a Guinness World Records certificate for the longest theatrical run, and in August 2026 its booking period at St Martin's was extended to 18 July 2027, carrying the London run into its 75th year. The producers said the theatre's public rooms would be redecorated to mark the anniversary, its bars replaced and a new foyer bar added.

=== Other stagings ===
A staging at the Toronto Truck Theatre in Toronto, Ontario, that opened on 19 August 1977 became Canada's longest running show, before finally closing on 18 January 2004 after a run of 26 years and over 9,000 performances.

On 18 November 2012, both the 25,000th performance and the 60th year of the production were marked by a special charity performance which featured Hugh Bonneville, Patrick Stewart, Julie Walters and Miranda Hart. The money raised by the performance went towards Mousetrap Theatre Projects.

During the sixtieth anniversary year of The Mousetrap, a touring production visited regional theatres for the first time, whilst the London run continued uninterrupted.

A "75th anniversary" tour of the UK and Ireland opens at The Alexandra in Birmingham on 3 September 2026, playing there until 12 September before visiting more than 25 cities into 2027. Directed by Hannah Chissick, with lighting design by Nic Farman, it stars Nicholas Bailey as Major Metcalf and Susan Penhaligon as Mrs Boyle, with Emily Laing as Mollie Ralston, Jack Hardwick as Giles Ralston, Thomas Barrett as Christopher Wren, Clare Duffy as Miss Casewell, James Peake as Mr Paravicini and Alfie Richards as Detective Sergeant Trotter.

The play has also been presented in 2013 in Singapore, Kuala Lumpur and Bangkok by the British Theatre Playhouse. The play has been staged in Queensland, Australia several times. In September 2011, it was staged at The Mousetrap Theatre in Redcliffe, the theatre group having been named after Christie's play. From July to August 2019, the Toowoomba Repertory Theatre Society performed the play in their home city. In November 2022, The Mousetrap was performed in Brisbane, the state's capital. In December 2022, after more than 70 years, the first Broadway production of The Mousetrap was announced to be staged in 2023 with an all-American cast.

== Characters ==
- Mollie Ralston – Proprietor of Monkswell Manor, and wife of Giles.
- Giles Ralston – Husband of Mollie who runs Monkswell Manor with his wife.
- Christopher Wren – The first guest to arrive at the hotel, Wren is a hyperactive young man who acts in a very peculiar manner. He admits he is running away from something, but refuses to say what. Wren claims to have been named after the architect of the same name by his parents.
- Mrs Boyle – A critical older woman who is pleased by nothing she observes.
- Major Metcalf – Retired from the army, little is known about Major Metcalf.
- Miss Casewell – A strange, aloof, masculine woman who speaks offhandedly about the horrific experiences of her childhood.
- Mr Paravicini – A man of unknown provenance, who turns up claiming his car has overturned in a snowdrift. He appears to be affecting a foreign accent and artificially aged with make-up.
- Detective Sergeant Trotter – The detective. He arrives in a snow storm and questions the proprietors and guests.
- Voice on the radio – source of news relevant to the story

== Twist ending and tradition of secrecy ==
As the curtain falls on every performance of The Mousetrap, the world’s longest-running play, applauding audience members are famously urged not to go on to reveal the secret solution to the murder mystery.

— Vanessa Thorpe in The Guardian, October 2024.

The murderer's identity is divulged near the end of the play, in a twist ending that is unusual for playing with the very basis of the traditional whodunnit formula, where the cliché is that the detective solves the crime and exposes the remaining plot secrets. By tradition, at the end of each performance, audiences are asked not to reveal the identity of the killer to anyone outside the theatre, to ensure that the end of the play is not spoiled for future audiences.

Christie was always upset by the plots of her works being revealed in reviews. In 2010, her grandson Mathew Prichard, who receives the royalties from the play, said he was "dismayed" to learn from The Independent that the ending to The Mousetrap had been described in the play's Wikipedia article.

Duncan Leatherdale of BBC News contrasted the play to other works like Psycho and The Sixth Sense, where the plot twist has been revealed and became itself an element of popular culture.

== Plot ==
The play is set in the Great Hall of Monkswell Manor, Berkshire, in what Christie described as "the present".

=== Act I ===
Monkswell Manor is a recently converted guesthouse run by a young couple, Mollie and Giles Ralston. Mollie listens to a radio report about the murder of a woman named Maureen Lyon in Paddington, London; police are looking for a man in a dark overcoat.

Their first four guests arrive: Christopher Wren, Mrs Boyle, Major Metcalf, and Miss Casewell. Christopher is an unkempt, flighty young man; Mrs Boyle is a constant complainer; Metcalf is an amiable ex-military man; and Miss Casewell is a mannish young woman. An unexpected fifth guest, Mr Paravicini, says his car has overturned in a snowdrift and the denizens of the house are snowed in. Uneasy, Mollie nevertheless places Paravicini in the last remaining room.

The next afternoon, Sergeant Trotter of the Berkshire Police arrives at the guesthouse on skis, while Metcalf discovers that the phone has stopped working. Trotter explains he has been sent regarding the murder of Maureen Lyon. The dead woman and her husband had mistreated their three foster children, the Corrigans, which resulted in the youngest's death. Police suspect the killer is the elder Corrigan boy, who would now be twenty-two.

A notebook at the murder scene contained the address of Monkswell Manor and the words "Three Blind Mice", while a note reading "This is the First" was pinned to the woman's body. Giles, Mollie, and all five guests deny a connection to the case. Afterward, Metcalf confronts Mrs Boyle, revealing that she was one of the magistrates who had assigned the children to the foster parents.

Later in the evening, Mrs Boyle wanders back into the now-empty room. The opening notes of "Three Blind Mice" are heard whistled by an unknown party and the lights go out. Moments later, Mollie finds Mrs Boyle dead on the floor.

=== Act II ===
Sergeant Trotter takes charge of the household, gathering the remaining residents together. Mollie cannot provide him with any useful clues. As each person recounts their whereabouts, Trotter observes various weaknesses in their stories, declaring that everyone had the opportunity to commit the murder. Giles counters that only one person fits the suspect's description: Christopher Wren, who insists that it is all a frame-up.

Trotter adds that the dead boy had other relatives and loved ones who might be interested in revenge, meaning that anyone in the guesthouse could be the killer. He also notes that both Giles and Mollie had secretly been in London on the day of the first murder. Trotter forces the aghast Mollie to admit that the couple knows little about each other's pasts. Christopher Wren later confesses to Mollie that he is actually an army deserter under a false name, and Mollie acknowledges that she, too, is running away from her past.

Again calling the household together, Trotter declares that he intends to check everyone's alibis. They will re-enact the murder; each person will act out another's alibi, with the hope that one alibi will be proved impossible. The household obediently disperses, leaving Trotter alone onstage.

==== Identity of the murderer ====
Trotter calls for Mollie and reveals he knows she was the schoolteacher of the Corrigan children. She failed to answer a letter the younger boy sent her, begging to be rescued from foster care. Due to illness, Mollie did not read the letter until after the boy's death; she is haunted by her failure to help.

Trotter points a gun at Mollie, telling her that he is not a real policeman, and that he cut the house's telephone wires. He is actually Georgie, the eldest of the three Corrigan siblings. He begins to strangle Mollie, but is stopped by the sudden appearance of Miss Casewell. She calls him by name and reveals that she is his long-lost sister Kathy, come to "take him somewhere safe".

Metcalf discloses that he himself is an undercover policeman; he arranged to replace the real Metcalf at the guesthouse to investigate and hid Trotter's skis after growing suspicious, preventing Trotter from escaping. Giles and Mollie admit that they were both secretly in London buying presents, as today is their first wedding anniversary.

== Critical reception ==
The play made little stir in the review pages of the British press when it opened. The Manchester Guardian commented that it was "a middling piece" with "less in it than meets the eye ... Coincidence is stretched unreasonably." The critic commented that the characters were "built entirely of clichés". The reviewer in The Times was more favourably disposed to the characters, calling them "nicely assorted, individually labelled and readily identified", and found the plot "elaborately skilful." In The Daily Express, John Barber praised "the atmosphere of shuddering suspense" but thought some of the characters "too obvious by half". In The Illustrated London News, J. C. Trewin commented that those who failed to spot the killer would probably call the plot "preposterous and over-burdened", but those who succeeded might be more kindly disposed.

== Publication history ==
The play was published as a paperback by Samuel French Ltd as French's Acting Edition No. 153 in 1954 and is still in print. It was first published in hardback in The Mousetrap and Other Plays by G. P. Putnam's Sons in 1978 (ISBN 0-396-07631-9).

== Film and television versions ==
In 1959, it was announced that Edward Small, who had produced Witness for the Prosecution for the screen, was to make a film version of the play in co-production with Victor Saville for United Artists. Tyrone Power and Maria Schell were named as leads. However, no film resulted.

In 1960, the Bengali author Premendra Mitra directed a film Chupi Chupi Aashey, based on the radio play and short story. In 1980, it was adapted into an Egyptian feature length television drama titled فندق الضحايا (Fondoa Al Dahaia, Hotel of Victims) that featured Egyptian actor Ahmed Zaki, in one of his earlier performances, in the role of the Detective. In 1990, Russian film director Samson Samsonov directed a film titled Мышеловка (Myshelovka, English: The Mousetrap) at Mosfilm. The script by Vladimir Basov is based on Christie's play.

In 2022, the story of a British-American film See How They Run was set in the Ambassadors Theatre and concerned in-story actors of The Mousetrap, following murders of personnel involved in the production of and linked to the play.

== See also ==
- Long-running plays
