= Lauderdale Beckett =

English film and stage actor

Lauderdale Carl Douglas Beckett (14 December 1896 – 5 August 1973) was an English stage and film actor.

== Early life ==
Lauderdale Beckett (also known as Guy Lauderdale Beckett) was born on 14 December 1896 in Hitchin, Hertfordshire, England, the son of Ada Beckett (Lauderdale) and Alfred George Stanley Pratt. He served in World War 1, as did his brothers Henry and Alfred.

=== Family history ===
Lauderdale Beckett came from a long-standing theatrical family. His grandmother, Lizzie Linington (known professionally as Mrs Fred Beckett) ran a theatre company, Miss Linington's Dramatic Company, with her husband Frederick Lorton Loncrain. Their children Paul, Ruby, Georgie and Ada acted in the company. Linington died in 1902.

Linington's daughter Ada Loncrain married Alfred George Stanley Pratt in 1889; Ada was known professionally as Ada Beckett or Ada Lauderdale and Pratt was known as George Sylvester or Harry Ansell. They had three sons: Henry, Alfred and Lauderdale. Henry Beckett and Alfred Beckett (d. 1961) also became actors.

Alfred Pratt (Harry Ansell) died in 1902. Ada Lauderdale, as she was then known, married another actor Charles Preece in 1903. Preece was also known as Carl Sisto and Carl Lauderdale. Ada died in 1935 in Brighton and Carl in 1848. Ada and Carl toured their own theatre company for over 30 years. Their son Earl Armstrong took over the company after Ada's death and continued to tour with his wife Catherine and their children. He died in 1987.

== Career ==
Beckett toured with many repertory theatre companies and fit-up companies, including with Tod Slaughter in a production of Jack the Ripper in 1944. In 1939 he toured with the Frank H. Fortescue Players in Geoffrey Langton's Wife and Ashes of Love.

He appeared in a number of films and TV series: Spy in Black, Land without Music, BBC Sunday Night Theatre, The Adventures of Annabel, A Woman of Property, The Avengers, and Emergency-Ward 10.

His appearances in the West End theatres include Warn that Man! with Gordon Harker, and as a member of the jury in Agatha Christie's Witness for the Prosecution from 1953 to 1955.

He died in London on 5 August 1973.
