= Mysie Monte =

English actress (1892–1983)

Mysie Monte (1892 – 9 January 1983) was an English stage and television actress best known for her long-running portrayal of Mrs Boyle in Agatha Christie's play The Mousetrap at the New Ambassadors Theatre. She played the part for twelve and a half years between 2 May 1955 and 26 November 1967, with a break between 20 November 1960 and 6 November 1961 when she was replaced by the actress Madoline Thomas. When asked in 1967 why she was leaving the cast Miss Monte replied "I think I have earned a rest."
