= David Raven (actor) =

David Raven (10 February 1909 – 9 October 1971) was an English actor who played Major Metcalf in 4,575 London performances of Agatha Christie's play The Mousetrap between 1957 and 1968; this number of performances earned him an entry in The Guinness Book of Records.
