= Patricia Jessel =

English actress (1920–1968)

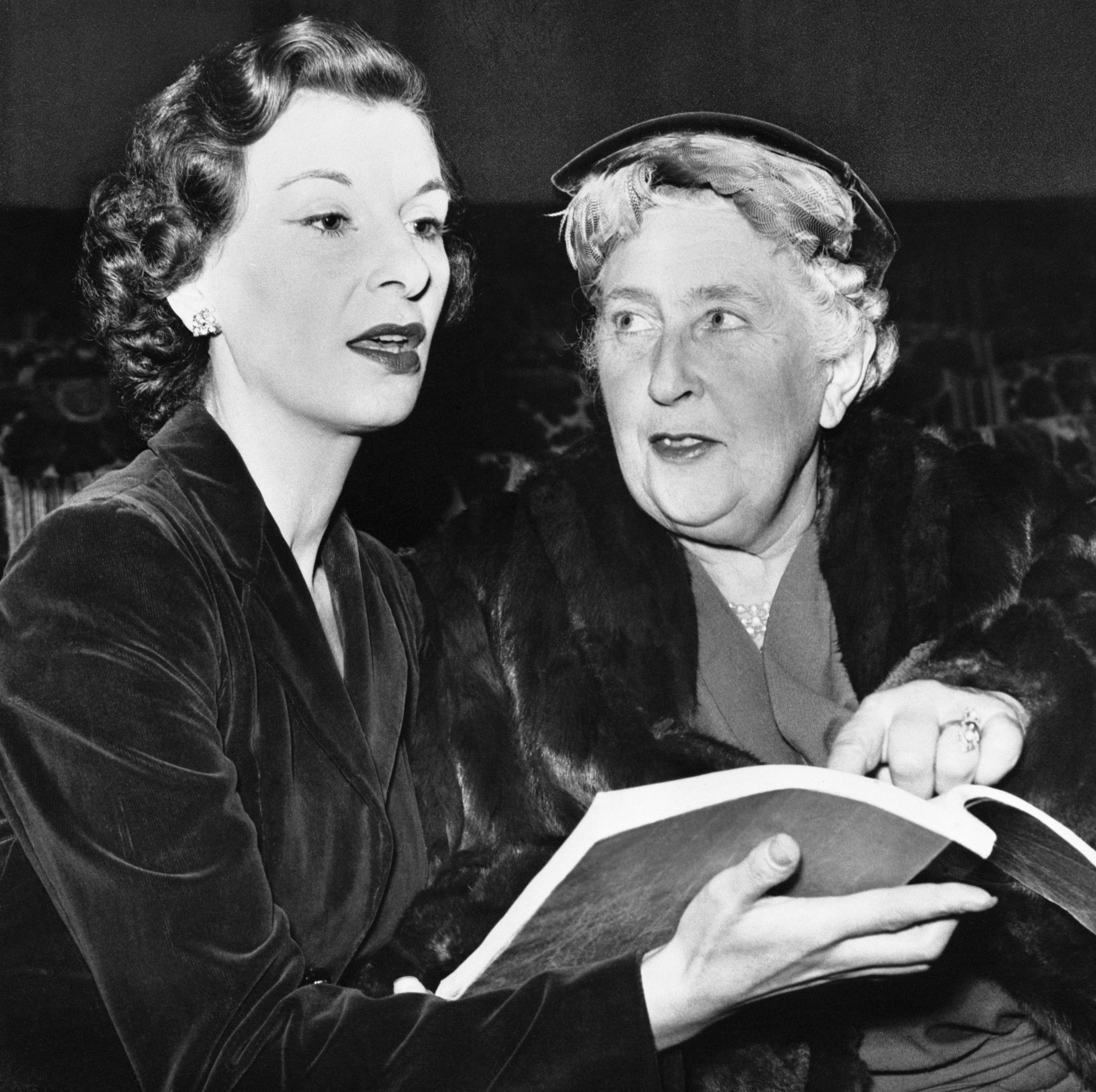
- Jessel (left) and Agatha Christie during rehearsals for Witness For The Prosecution (1953)
- Born: Patricia Helen Mary Jessel; 15 October 1920; Hong Kong
- Died: 8 June 1968 (aged 47); London, England
- Resting place: Mortlake Crematorium
- Education: Italia Conti Academy of Theatre Arts
- Occupation: Actress
- Spouse: Joseph George Feinberg
- Children: 1

Patricia Helen Mary Jessel (15 October 1920 – 8 June 1968) was an English actress of stage, film and television.

== Biography ==
Jessel was born in the then British Crown Colony of Hong Kong, only child of army captain Clement Edward Jessel and Ursula Theodora (née Buckley). Her father was the younger son of Frank Herbert Jessel and Florence Lucy (née McCarthy), the eldest sister of Lillah McCarthy, making Patricia the grandniece of the famous actress. At the time of the 1939 register, Patricia was staying with Lillah and her husband in Fowey.

Jessel was at the Italia Conti Drama School when she played her first professional role, Wendy in the pantomime Peter Pan. She left at 16 to begin her professional career. Her final performance was in an episode of Dr. Finlay's Casebook.

She was on the committees of the Actors' Charitable Trust and the Stars Organisation for Spastics (SOS), established by Vera Lynn in 1953.

== Personal life ==
Patricia Jessel married Dr Joseph George Feinberg, an American veterinary surgeon, in London in 1948. They had one child, Patricia Ann, born in Marylebone in 1947, who married Patrick John Stoner in London in 1983. Patricia Feinberg Stoner is a noted author.

Patricia Helen Mary Jessel died of a heart attack on 8 June 1968 (Note: Some references have date of death 10 June 1968) at her home of many years, Flat 2, 17 Old Church Street. Chelsea. Her funeral was held at Mortlake Crematorium on the 14th. Joseph died on 12 August 2000, aged 85, and was also cremated at Mortlake. He requested in his will that “my ashes shall be scattered in the gardens of the Crematorium where they can mingle with those of my Wife".

== Stage performances ==
- (1943) In Twelfth Night in the Stratford Theatre Festival at the Shakespeare Memorial Theatre with Abraham Sofaer and Anna Konstam in the cast. Milton Rosmer was director.
- (1943) In Othello in the Stratford Theatre Festival with Abraham Sofaer, Baliol Holloway, and Anna Konstam in the cast. Milton Rosmer directed.
- (1944) In The Taming of the Shrew in the Stratford Theatre Festival with Anthony Eustrel, Mary Honer, Graham Crowden (3rd Huntsman) and Lionel Blair (Gregory) in the cast. Robert Atkins was director.
- (1944) In A Midsummer's Night Dream in the Stratford Theatre Festival at the Shakespeare Memorial Festival in Stratford, England with John Byron, Cliff Weir, Antony Eustrel, and Toto Capper-Parlby in the cast. Robert Atkins directed.
- (21 February 1949 – 12 March 1949) She acted in the Shakespeare Season at the Bedford Theatre in Camden Town, London with Donald Wolfit, Rosalind Iden, and Joseph O'Conor in the cast.
- (1951 - 1952) In Peter Ustinov's play, The Love of Four Colonels at Wyndham's Theatre in London, with Peter Ustinov, Theodore Bikel, and Moira Lister in the cast. John Fernald was director.
- (1953) She acted in Agatha Christie's play, Witness for the Prosecution at the Winter Garden Theatre in London, England with David Horne and Derek Blomfield in the cast.
- (1957) Played the lead in Monique at the John Golden Theatre on Broadway
- (30 October 1963) Played Epifania Ognissanti Di Parerga in George Bernard Shaw's The Millionairess at the Goodman Theatre in Chicago. John Reich was director.

== Film and TV appearances ==
- (1948) Liberation. TV Movie
- (1948) Without Witness. TV Movie.
- (1949) Counsellor at Law. TV Movie
- (1949) A Man's House. TV Movie
- (1950–1958) BBC Sunday-Night Theatre. TV Series. 4 episodes
- (1957) ITV Television Playhouse. TV Series. 1 episode
- (1957) The Flesh Is Weak
- (1957) The Queen and the Rebels. TV Movie
- (1958–1959) Armchair Theatre. TV Series. 2 episodes
- (1958) The Man Upstairs
- (1959–1960) Fredric March Presents Tales from Dickens. TV Series. 3 episodes
- (1959) Model for Murder
- (1959) The Invisible Man. TV Series. 1 episode
- (1960-1964) Mam'selle. TV Series. 3 episodes
- (1960) Beware of Children
- (1960) No Kidding
- (1960) The City of the Dead
- (1961) Hamlet. TV Series
- (1961) No Hiding Place. TV Series. 1 episode
- (1961) Horror Hotel
- (1961) Play of the Week. TV Series. 2 episodes
- (1962-1963) The Old Curiosity Shop. TV Mini Series. 7 episodes
- (1963) Espionage. TV Series. 1 episode
- (1964) A Jolly Bad Fellow
- (1964) Compact. TV Series. 4 episodes
- (1966) A Funny Thing Happened on the Way to the Forum.
- (1967) The Prisoner. TV Series. 1 episode
- (1969) Dr. Finlay's Casebook. TV Series. 1 episode
