= Witness for the Prosecution (1957 film) =

Film by Billy Wilder

- Theatrical release poster
- Directed by: Billy Wilder
- Screenplay by: Billy Wilder; Harry Kurnitz
- Adaptation by: Larry Marcus
- Based on: The Witness for the Prosecution; 1925 story / 1953 play by Agatha Christie
- Produced by: Arthur Hornblow Jr.
- Starring: Tyrone Power; Marlene Dietrich; Charles Laughton; Elsa Lanchester; John Williams
- Cinematography: Russell Harlan
- Edited by: Daniel Mandell
- Music by: Matty Malneck
- Production company: Edward Small Productions
- Distributed by: United Artists
- Release date: December 17, 1957
- Running time: 116 minutes
- Country: United States
- Language: English
- Budget: $2 million or $1.7 million
- Box office: $9 million

Witness for the Prosecution is a 1957 American legal mystery melodrama film directed by Billy Wilder and starring Tyrone Power, Marlene Dietrich, and Charles Laughton, with Elsa Lanchester and John Williams. The film, which has elements of bleak black comedy and film noir, is a courtroom drama set in the Old Bailey in London and is based on the 1953 play of the same title by Agatha Christie. The first film adaptation of Christie's story, Witness for the Prosecution was written for the screen by Wilder and Harry Kurnitz and adapted by Larry Marcus.

The film was acclaimed by critics and received six Academy Award nominations, including Best Picture. It also received five Golden Globe Award nominations including a win for Elsa Lanchester as Best Actress in a Supporting Role. Additionally, the film was selected as the sixth-best courtroom drama ever by the American Film Institute for their AFI's 10 Top 10 list.

In the film, a man accused of killing a wealthy widow, who had named him as the main beneficiary in her will, undergoes a trial during which his wife testifies against him.

== Plot ==
Senior barrister Sir Wilfrid Robarts is nearing retirement after a heart attack. He agrees to defend Leonard Vole, despite Nurse Plimsoll's objections and Sir Wilfrid's doctor having warned against taking stressful criminal cases. Leonard is accused of murdering Emily French, a wealthy, childless widow who fell in love with him and named him as the main beneficiary in her will. Despite the evidence, Sir Wilfrid believes his client to be innocent.

Sir Wilfrid speaks with Leonard's German wife, Christine, whom he finds cold and self-possessed; she provides Leonard with an alibi, but Sir Wilfrid warns her that juries often do not accept alibis given by spouses. Sir Wilfred is later shocked when Christine is called to give evidence against Leonard as a prosecution witness.

While a wife cannot be compelled to testify against her husband, it is revealed that her marriage to Leonard is invalid, as she was already married to another man, Otto Helm, still alive and living in Germany. She states that she never loved Leonard, and her conscience compels her to tell the truth. She explains that she met Leonard, a Royal Air Force sergeant serving in Berlin's British occupation zone, and went through a marriage ceremony with him solely to escape from Soviet-controlled territory. According to her testimony, Leonard arrived home after the time of the murder, and openly confessed that he had killed Mrs. French.

Sir Wilfrid fears that his client will be convicted and sentenced to hang. He is then unexpectedly contacted by a Cockney woman, who offers to sell him compromising letters written by Christine to a man named Max. The handwriting is genuine, and the woman appears to have a legitimate reason for providing the correspondence: Max, who had once been her lover, had attacked her, leaving her with facial scars. During cross examination, Sir Wilfrid reads the letters, which disclose a conspiracy between Max and Christine to frame Leonard. The jury acquits Leonard.

Sir Wilfrid admits that his victory seemed suspiciously easy, and is proved right when Christine returns to the courtroom to avoid an angry crowd waiting outside. She explains that, after Sir Wilfred's earlier warnings about alibis, she had decided to pose as a hateful, double-crossing wife. She wrote letters to a non-existent lover (Max) and impersonated the disfigured woman who passed them to Sir Wilfrid. Christine loves Leonard, but knew he was guilty; she told the truth about Leonard's confession in the witness-box, then used the false letters to discredit her own testimony. Sir Wilfrid is outraged, but the law of double jeopardy prevents any renewed prosecution of Leonard.

Leonard reveals he is having an affair with a much younger woman, and intends to abandon Christine. He smugly states that, though Christine will be tried for perjury, he and she are now even, having saved each other's lives. A devastated Christine grabs a knife and fatally stabs Leonard. As she is taken into custody, Sir Wilfrid decides to further delay his retirement to defend Christine.

== Cast ==
- Tyrone Power as Leonard Vole, the accused
- Marlene Dietrich as Christine Vole/Helm, the accused's wife
- Charles Laughton as Sir Wilfrid Robarts Q.C., senior counsel for Leonard
- Elsa Lanchester as Miss Plimsoll, Sir Wilfrid's private nurse
- Una O'Connor as Janet McKenzie, Mrs. French's deaf housekeeper and a prosecution witness
- John Williams as Mr. Brogan-Moore, Sir Wilfrid's junior counsel in the trial
- Henry Daniell as Mr. Mayhew, Leonard's solicitor who instructs Sir Wilfrid on the case
- Torin Thatcher as Mr. Myers Q.C., the Crown prosecutor
- Philip Tonge as Chief Inspector Hearne, the arresting officer
- Ian Wolfe as H. A. Carter, Sir Wilfrid's chief clerk and office manager
- Francis Compton as Mr. Justice Wainwright, the judge
- Norma Varden as Mrs. Emily Jane French, the woman who was murdered
- Ruta Lee as Diana, a young woman watching the trial, waiting for Leonard to be freed

=== Uncredited ===
- Patrick Aherne as the court officer
- Eddie Baker as a courtroom spectator
- Marjorie Eaton as Miss O'Brien
- Franklyn Farnum as an old barrister
- Bess Flowers as a courtroom spectator
- Colin Kenny as a juror
- Ottola Nesmith as Miss Johnson
- J. Pat O'Malley as the shorts salesman
- Jack Raine as Sir Wilfrid's doctor
- Ben Wright as court clerk (the officer reading charges)

== Production ==
Producers Arthur Hornblow and Edward Small bought the rights to the play for $450,000. The play was adjusted to emphasize the character of the defence barrister. Billy Wilder was signed to direct in April 1956. According to Wilder, when the producers approached Marlene Dietrich about the part, she accepted on the condition that Wilder direct. Wilder said that Dietrich liked "to play a murderess" but was "a little bit embarrassed when playing the love scenes."

Vivien Leigh was considered for the role of Christine Vole. Laughton based his performance on Florance Guedella, his own lawyer, an Englishman who was known for twirling his monocle while cross-examining witnesses.

In a flashback showing how Leonard and Christine first meet in a German nightclub, she is wearing her trademark trousers, made famous by Dietrich in director Josef von Sternberg's film Morocco (1930). A rowdy customer rips them down one side, revealing one of Dietrich's renowned legs and starting a brawl. The scene required 145 extras and 38 stuntmen, and cost $90,000. The bar is called Die blaue Laterne (English: The Blue Lantern), which is a reference to Dietrich's 1930 film The Blue Angel.

== United Artists' "surprise ending" ==
At the end of the film, as the credits roll, a voiceover announces:

The management of this theater suggests that, for the greater entertainment of your friends who have not yet seen the picture, you will not divulge to anyone the secret of the ending of Witness for the Prosecution.

This was in keeping with the advertising campaign for the film. One of the posters said: "You'll talk about it! – but please don't tell the ending!"

The effort to keep the ending a secret extended to the cast. Billy Wilder did not allow the actors to view the final ten pages of the script until it was time to shoot those scenes. The secrecy reportedly cost Marlene Dietrich an Academy Award nomination, as United Artists did not want to call attention to the fact that Dietrich was practically unrecognizable as the Cockney woman who hands over the incriminating letters to the defense.

== Reception ==
=== Box office ===
Witness for the Prosecution reached number one at the American box office for two consecutive weeks in February and March 1958. In its first year, the film earned $3.75 million in distributor rentals in the United States and Canada.

=== Critical response ===
In a contemporary review for The New York Times, critic Bosley Crowther wrote: "[T]here's never a dull or worthless moment. It's all parry and punch from the word 'Go!', which is plainly announced when the accused man is brought to Mr. Laughton at the beginning of the film. And the air in the courtroom fairly crackles with emotional electricity, until that staggering surprise in the last reel. Then the whole drama explodes. It's the staging of the scenes that is important in this rapidly moving film ... It's the balancing of well-marked characters, the shifts of mood, the changes of pace and the interesting bursts of histrionics that the various actors display."

Agatha Christie "herself considered it the finest film derived from one of her stories." In TV Guide's review of the film, it received four and a half stars out of five, the writer saying that "Witness for the Prosecution is a witty, terse adaptation of the Agatha Christie hit play brought to the screen with ingenuity and vitality by Billy Wilder." The American Film Institute included the film on their AFI's 10 Top 10 list at number six in the courtroom-drama category.

Alfred Hitchcock spoke of how happy he was that Witness for the Prosecution was often mistaken for his similar but critical and commercial flop, The Paradine Case.

On the review aggregator website Rotten Tomatoes, the film holds an approval rating of 100% based on 38 reviews, with an average rating of 8.7/10.

=== Accolades ===
Award	Category	Recipient(s)	Result
Academy Awards	Best Picture	Arthur Hornblow Jr.	Nominated
Academy Awards	Best Director	Billy Wilder	Nominated
Academy Awards	Best Actor	Charles Laughton	Nominated
Academy Awards	Best Supporting Actress	Elsa Lanchester	Nominated
Academy Awards	Best Film Editing	Daniel Mandell	Nominated
Academy Awards	Best Sound Recording	Gordon E. Sawyer	Nominated
British Academy Film Awards	Best Actor in a Leading Role	Charles Laughton	Nominated
David di Donatello Awards	Best Foreign Actor	Charles Laughton	Won
Directors Guild of America Awards	Outstanding Directorial Achievement in Motion Pictures	Billy Wilder	Nominated
Edgar Allan Poe Awards	Best Motion Picture	Billy Wilder and Harry Kurnitz	Nominated
Golden Globe Awards	Best Motion Picture – Drama		Nominated
Golden Globe Awards	Best Actor in a Motion Picture – Drama	Charles Laughton	Nominated
Golden Globe Awards	Best Actress in a Motion Picture – Drama	Marlene Dietrich	Nominated
Golden Globe Awards	Best Supporting Actress – Motion Picture	Elsa Lanchester	Won
Golden Globe Awards	Best Director – Motion Picture	Billy Wilder	Nominated
Laurel Awards	Top Drama		4th Place
Laurel Awards	Top Female Dramatic Performance	Marlene Dietrich	2nd Place
Online Film & Television Association Awards	Hall of Fame – Motion Picture		Won

== Home media ==
Witness for the Prosecution was first released on a U.S. Region 1 widescreen DVD by MGM Home Entertainment on December 11, 2001 and with a new restoration by Kino Lorber (under license from MGM) on Blu-ray and DVD on July 22, 2014; both versions were followed by many other countries.

== See also ==
- List of American films of 1957
- Trial film
