= The Monkey's Paw (disambiguation) =

"The Monkey's Paw" is a short story by W. W. Jacobs.

The Monkey's Paw may also refer to:

== Films ==
- The Monkey's Paw (1923 film), a British silent film
- The Monkey's Paw (1933 film), a 1933 United States horror film
- The Monkey's Paw (1948 film), a 1948 British horror film
- The Monkey's Paw (2013 film), a 2013 horror film

== Other ==
- The Monkey's Paw (bookstore), a Toronto bookstore
- "The Monkey's Paw" (The Simpsons), a 1991 episode
- "Monkey's Paw", a song by Smalltown Poets from the 1997 eponymous album
- Monkey's Paw, cheating device used on older computerized slot machines
- Marcgravia umbellata, species of flowering vine referred to as "monkey paws"

== See also ==
- Monkey Fist (disambiguation)
- MonkeyPaw Games, an American video game publisher
- Monkeypaw Productions
- Monkey's paw knot or monkey's fist
