= Orson Welles Great Mysteries =

British TV series (1973–1974)

- Opening title card
- Theme music composer: John Barry
- Country of origin: United Kingdom
- No. of series: 1
- No. of episodes: 26

Production
- Running time: 25 minutes
- Production company: Anglia Television

Original release
- Network: ITV
- Release: 1 September 1973 – 24 February 1974

Orson Welles Great Mysteries is a British television series originally transmitted between 1973 and 1974, produced by Anglia Television for the ITV network.

The series is an anthology of mystery stories. Each episode is introduced by Orson Welles, the only regular actor in the series, whose appearances were confined to the introductory and closing sequences. In the opening titles, Welles appears shown in silhouette walking through a hallway towards the camera, smoking a cigar and outfitted in a broad-brimmed hat and a huge cloak. When he actually appears on-screen to introduce the episodes, his face is all that is shown, in extreme close-up and very low lighting.

== Episodes ==
The introductions and conclusions to all episodes were performed by Orson Welles who, uncredited, also wrote and directed them. The credits below are for the individual plays.

No.	Title	Directed by	Written by	Original release date
1	"Captain Rogers"	Alan Gibson	Harry Green, based on the story by W. W. Jacobs	1 September 1973
The respectable owner of a quiet inn in 18th century England is blackmailed by a grubby stranger, who knows the innkeeper is secretly the notorious pirate Captain Rogers. Cast includes: Donald Pleasence, Joseph O'Conor, Willoughby Goddard, Kevin Stoney, Donald Gee, Daphne Heard, Alan Bennion
2	"The Leather Funnel"	Alan Gibson	David Ambrose, based on the story by Arthur Conan Doyle	8 September 1973
A young man talks with the uncle of the girl he wants to marry, and is told a strange story about a curious funnel made of leather. While falling asleep next to the device, he has a presentiment that it was once used as an instrument of torture. Cast includes: Christopher Lee, Simon Ward, Jane Seymour, Ralph Arliss
3	"A Terribly Strange Bed"	Alan Cooke	Anthony Fowles, based on the story by Wilkie Collins	15 September 1973
Charles Faulkner, a young American gambler in Paris, should have left the casino after striking it lucky. Why the devil did he agree to sleep in the casino's guest bed? This was to be the most horrible night he had ever lived. Cast includes: Rupert Davies, Colin Baker, Edward Albert, Hugo De Vernier, John Slavid
4	"La Grande Breteche"	Peter Sasdy	Martin Worth, based on the story by Honoré de Balzac	22 September 1973
A Spanish officer, captured by the French during the Peninsular War, is imprisoned near the country house of an elderly aristocrat with a bored young wife - whose lover he becomes, with deadly consequences. Cast includes: Peter Cushing, Susannah York, Morag Hood, Marc Zuber, Pauline Delaney
5	"The Dinner Party"	John Robins	Julian Bond, based on a story by James Michael Ullman	29 September 1973
Blake is a brilliant accountant, but does he deserve a promotion to the board of directors? It all depends on the suitability of his wife. His bosses attend a small dinner party given by the Blakes to check her out, and Mrs Blake seems to be a lower class, loud, obnoxious woman. Or is everything as it seems? Cast includes: Joan Collins, Anton Rodgers, Peter Cellier
6	"Money to Burn"	Alan Gibson	Michael Gilbert, based on the story by Margery Allingham	6 October 1973
A French girl in London finds herself in the awkward position of owing money to an old friend of her father's, who would prefer a much ... closer ... relationship with her. As she pays back her due in installments, he contemptuously keeps setting fire to the money after accepting it. Why? Cast includes: Victor Buono, Isabel Dean, Olga Georges-Picot, Glyn Owen
7	"In the Confessional"	Peter Sasdy	David Ambrose, based on a story by Alice Scanlan Reach	13 October 1973
An old tramp, while stealing from the donation boxes, gets locked inside a church, and, concealed within the confessional, overhears the details of a grisly murder. But not everything is as straightforward as it seems. Cast includes: José Ferrer, Shane Rimmer, Milo O'Shea, Phil Davis, Julie Dawn Cole
8	"Unseen Alibi"	Mark Cullingham	Kenneth Jupp, based on the story by Bruce Graeme	20 October 1973
Jerry Norton arrives in London from America. Following instructions from the actress he wants to marry, he arrives at a hotel room, and finds a murdered man inside. The police arrives as he tries to leave, and soon he finds out he is the main suspect - in the murder of the husband of the woman he wanted to marry! Cast includes: Dean Stockwell, Joss Ackland
9	"Battle of Wits"	James Ferman	Roger Marshall, based on a story by Maisie Sharman, credited as Miriam Sharman	27 October 1973
At the end of the semester, college professor Richard Lumsden is getting ready for vacation - and retirement. However, he is interrupted by an angry parent of a student, who blames him for his son's suicide after he was expelled for stealing. The man makes it clear he wants to murder Lumsden and frame his death as a suicide, and the professor engages his would-be murderer in a battle of wits to convince him he cannot make it look believable for the police. Cast includes: Ian Bannen, Brewster Mason
10	"A Point of Law"	Peter Sykes	Donald Wilson, based on the story by W. Somerset Maugham	3 November 1973
A lawyer cannot stop a middle-aged spinster from making a fool of herself with a young fortune-hunter, but he can stop the fellow from getting his hands on her money. Cast includes: Alec McCowen, Anna Massey, Roland Culver, Michael Petrovich, Michael Gover
11	"The Monkey's Paw"	Alan Gibson	David Ambrose, based on the story by W. W. Jacobs	10 November 1973
An old army sergeant, back in England after long service in India, shows some old friends a strange possession he's acquired - a monkey's paw which can make three wishes come true, but with a horrible cost. Cast includes: Michael Kitchen; Megs Jenkins; Patrick Magee, Cyril Cusack, Robert James
12	"The Ingenious Reporter"	Carey Harrison	Carey Harrison, based on a story by Pontsevrez	17 November 1973
Ambitious reporter Harry Langley pretends to be the murderer of unidentified woman, to boost sales with a special report from prison. But once arrested, the authorities seem to be convinced that he is indeed the killer - because the victim has been identified as his fiancée! Cast includes: David Birney; Geoffrey Bayldon, James Maxwell, Anthony Ainley, John Cater, James Mellor, Neil Wilson, Peter Madden, Pam St. Clement, Eamonn Boyce
13	"Death of an Old-Fashioned Girl"	Alan Gibson	Anthony Fowles, based on the short story by Stanley Ellin	24 November 1973
After the wife of a famous artist is stabbed to death, the police investigate four people connected to the case, and present in the building when the murder happened: the artist himself, his gallery manager, his old friend and fellow artist, and the latter's wife. From their recollections emerge the image of a shrewd and manipulative woman, who ingrained herself into the artist's life, destroyed his previous marriage and drove that wife to suicide, and then completely took over his life and financial situation, alienating him from his friends. It seems everyone had a reason to kill her, but perhaps, it wasn't any of them who held the knife. Cast includes: Carol Lynley, Francesca Annis, John Le Mesurier, Anne Stallybrass, Jack Shepherd, Jon Laurimore
14	"For Sale - Silence"	Peter Sykes	David Ambrose, based on a story by Don Knowlton	1 December 1973
Successful businessman Pennington has an affair in a dingy motel, and is then contacted and blackmailed by a Mr. Briggs, who, in a very business-like fashion, outlines his demands. But it seems that Briggs has underestimated his opponent, and the tables might be turning. Cast includes: Ed Devereaux, Jack Cassidy
15	"The Inspiration of Mr. Budd"	Peter Sasdy	Kenneth Jupp, based on the story by Dorothy L. Sayers	8 December 1973
How did Mr. Budd become a top-class West End hairdresser after such humble origins in a suburban barbershop? Years ago, he was running a small barbershop, he got an eccentric customer who wanted a shave, and to dye his flaming red hair to a new colour. As Budd chatted with his client and read the news, he realized that the eccentric man is a fugitive murderer - and that his own life was in danger too. Cast includes: Donal Donnelly, Hugh Griffith, Glynn Edwards, André Maranne, Neville Barber, Robert La Bassiere;, Guy Deghy
16	"An Affair of Honour"	Alan Bromly	Carey Harrison, based on a story by F. Britten Austin	15 December 1973
In the years of British-ruled India, the secret plans for the defence of a harbour have been copied. With only three people having access to the safe's key, General Sanderson tasks officers Bryce and Rolfe with convincing the apparent traitor, Fanshaw, to "save his honour" by committing suicide, rather than going through an embarrassing court martial. Complicating matters is that Bryce used to be in love with Fanshaw's wife, but promised her that this would not come between their friendship. Cast includes: Harry Andrews, Jeremy Clyde, Michael Gambon, Jenny Hanley
17	"Farewell to the Faulkners"	Peter Sykes	Alun Richards, based on the story by Miriam Allen DeFord	22 December 1973
The Faulkners were an odd family - two spinsters living in a large mansion, served by one maid, with their only relative being their young brother, married but living elsewhere. When one night one of the sisters suddenly disappears without a trace - leaving her clothes behind - everyone is puzzled, but the remaining sister refuses to call the police, thinking on the family's good name - as there have been cases of insanity in the family before. A private detective finds nothing, and a few months later the other sister disappears in the same manner. The police are now alerted and begin to investigate - and soon it is revealed these two were not the first disappearances in the family. Cast includes: Keith Baxter, Jane Baxter, Kenneth Gilbert, John Ringham
18	"The Power of Fear"	Peter Sasdy	N.J. Crisp, based on "Suburban Tigress" by Lawrence Treat	29 December 1973
Mrs Brenner, wife of a successful lawyer, is home alone, awaiting the plumber. The man, however, acts more than intrusive, and uses false excuses to go to the bathroom and bedroom, inspecting things while she is waiting elsewhere. When it comes to matters of payment, Mrs Brenner is shocked when he insists to get £1000 in cash - or he will start rumours about an extramarital affair, since he spent so much time in her house and knows intimate details about her bedroom. He also reveals he has blackmailed other women in the suburbs and they have all paid him. Mrs Brenner is given one day to come up with the money, but she is torn about paying for his silence, or somehow punishing this disgusting, abrasive creep. Cast includes: Don Murray, Shirley Knight
19	"Where There's a Will"	Michael Gilbert	Michael Gilbert	5 January 1974
When local lawyer Bruce Sexton reads in the newspaper that a client of his has died, he has the will opened, and he and his partner Theresa Prentice find a letter to be opened only after his death, wherein he confesses to the murder of a local prostitute known to have been blackmailing rich clients. However, the client suddenly calls them, and it turns out that, instead, a similarly named relative of his has died. Sexton, torn by duty to the client and morals, informs the police without revealing who confessed to the murder, but things get complicated when the police - and his partner - start to suspect him of being the murderer. Cast includes: Richard Johnson, Hannah Gordon, Bill Maynard, Sheila Raynor, Robert Cartland
20	"A Time to Remember"	Peter Sykes	Kenneth Jupp, based on a story by James Reach	12 January 1974
Businessman Charles Foster is visited by MI6 agents in his office. They take him to an army base, where he is led in to meet a man he eventually recognizes as Mikhail Zigorin, a Soviet general, whom he befriended at the siege of Berlin 30 years ago. Apparently, he has defected to the West. However, MI6 is unsure whether this man is the real Zigorin, or a double sent to be a mole in their organization. Foster lists various characteristics and mannerisms he recalls of Zigorin, but at the end, he settles for one true test of the validity of his claims. Cast includes: Patrick Macnee, Charles Gray, Patrick Barr, Alan Browning, Nell Curran
21	"Ice Storm"	Alan Gibson	N.J. Crisp, based on the short story by Jerome Barry	19 January 1974
When Sheila Parnell is phoned by her employer and warned that one of the three experts who are arriving to view his collection of valuable old manuscripts has been replaced by a thief, she is worried... and when the call is interrupted and she receives news that her employer has been found dead, she is terrified. But the road is snowed in by a blizzard, and the murderer has cut the phone line, so apart from the curmudgeonly driver who does not believe her story, she has no-one to rely on but herself, as she tries to listen to the three experts talk and find out which one of them could be the murderer. Cast includes: Claire Bloom, Thorley Walters, Robert Beatty, Brian Wilde, Donald Eccles, Barry Jackson, George Malpas
22	"Come Into My Parlour"	Peter Sasdy	Elaine Morgan, based on the story by Gloria Amoury	26 January 1974
Famous pianist Vivian Carson is in Naples, and she has spent considerable time and effort to find and invite older actress Marcia Loredo - and also to find and procure some yellow powder on the black market that causes a deadly disease, fatal in six weeks. As an unsuspecting Marcia arrives and wonders why she was invited, a tale of old love is brought to the fore, as Vivian still harbours resentment towards Marcia for seducing the man she once loved. But was that now-dead man truly as important to her as she remembers him, and is the memory worth murdering someone over it? Cast includes: Anne Jackson, Dana Wynter
23	"Compliments of the Season"	Philip Saville	Donald Wilson, based upon the story by O. Henry	3 February 1974
A British millionaire's spoiled little girl loses her ragdoll, and buying her new dolls does not make her happy, so the parents put out an noticeoffering a £25 reward money for the doll. Having been buried by the family dog, the doll is found by a drunken tramp, who takes it with him to a pub, pretending it is a high class lady, to the amusement of the audience. Two low-lifes frequenting the pub realize the doll is worth money, and force the tramp at knifepoint to return it, planning to take the money from him later. But his uncanny knowledge of the paintings in the house impresses the lady of the house enough that she has him driven home by car, so he avoids the robbers. Cast includes: Eli Wallach, Hildegard Neil, Ed Bishop, Preston Lockwood, Michael Brennan, Andy Bradford
24	"Under Suspicion"	Peter Sasdy	Anthony Fowles, based on a story by Norman Edwards	10 February 1974
Madam Freya, a famous pianist who long ago left her country and is thus legally not a citizen of any country, is currently on tour in a South American country troubled by a rebellion, living in a hotel and often visited by friend and lover Jorge Vega. On the day of her last concert before her departure, a member of the country's secret police visits her, and recruits her against her will to spy on the hotel room next door, which serves as a drop-off point for rebel messages. Freya does not want to help, but is forced to do so when her passport is confiscated. She is instructed to signal the secret servicemen by playing a different type of music on her piano in case the courier is innocent, or guilty. To her shock, she sees Jorge Vega arriving that day, who says goodbye and instructs her to deliver a manuscript to a friend in another country. As he leaves, Freya plays the music for guilty, and Vega is arrested and shot when he tries to escape. The agent scolds Freya, as they found nothing on Vega, meaning he was innocent. However, Freya reveals she gave him up not because he was a traitor - but because she saw him coming out the room of Senora Zerlina, a young lady of ill repute, and realized he has been cheating on her all this time. The agent, angry at the failure, finds the manuscript and opens it, revealing that Jorge was not just a cheating lover, but ALSO the rebel contact, and was about to have Freya smuggle the message out of the country for him. Cast includes: Janice Rule, Kenneth Haigh, Dinsdale Landen, Julie Crosthwaite
25	"Trial for Murder"	Peter Sykes	David Lawrie, based on the short story by C.A Collins and Charles Dickens	17 February 1974
In the 19th century, Charles Stubbs is a perfectly ordinary citizen, until one day he sees the terrifying spirit of a murdered old man appear to him. Shortly thereafter, he is summoned to be head of the jury on a murder trial, where a man called Higgins is accused of murdering an old man after he was caught cheating with his wife. Stubbs does not want to attend, but when the ghost appears to him again, he decides to accept the task. At the trial, Higgins complains about Stubbs being on the jury, despite the two never having met - since it is revealed that the apparition of Stubbs holding a noose appeared to him in jail every night. During the trial, both Stubbs and the defense lawyer, as well as a prostitute trying to provide an alibi for Higgins, keep seeing glimpses of the ghost, and eventually even the last opposing jury member is convinced of Higgins' guilt, and he is found guilty. Later, when Stubbs reads in the papers about Higgins' execution, the ghost appears to him a final time, nodding thanks, then fading away, having been put to rest. Cast includes: Ian Holm, Jennie Linden, Lindsay Ingram, John Savident, Barry Stanton, Edwin Finn
26	"The Furnished Room"	Alan Gibson	David Ambrose, based on the short story by O. Henry	24 February 1974
A young man's months-long search for a missing girl ends in a haunted room in a boarding house. Cast includes: Irene Worth, Clarence Williams III

== Parody ==
Welles' introductory sequence was parodied by Benny Hill (as "Orson Buggy") in an episode of his television programme.

== Availability ==
The home media rights are held by ITV Studios. In 2019 Network released half of the series on Region 2 DVD as Volume 1 in the UK.

Volume 2 released Oct 26th 2020.
