= A Cigarette-Maker's Romance =

1913 British film by Frank Wilson

- Directed by: Frank Wilson
- Written by: Francis Marion Crawford (novella); John Martin Harvey
- Starring: John Martin Harvey; Nell de Silva; Margaret Yarde
- Production company: Hepworth Pictures
- Distributed by: Hepworth Pictures
- Release date: September 1913
- Country: United Kingdom
- Languages: Silent; English intertitles

A Cigarette-Maker's Romance is a 1913 British silent drama film directed by Frank Wilson and starring John Martin Harvey, Nell de Silva and Margaret Yarde. It was based on a novella by Francis Marion Crawford which had been turned into a popular stage play by Martin Harvey. A Russian Count has to live in poverty in Munich where he falls in love with a co-worker at the cigarette factory where he is employed.

== Cast ==
- John Martin Harvey as Count Skariartine
- Nell de Silva as Viera
- Margaret Yarde as Woman

== Bibliography ==
- Palmer, Scott. British Film Actors' Credits, 1895-1987. McFarland, 1988.
