= Margaret More (composer) =

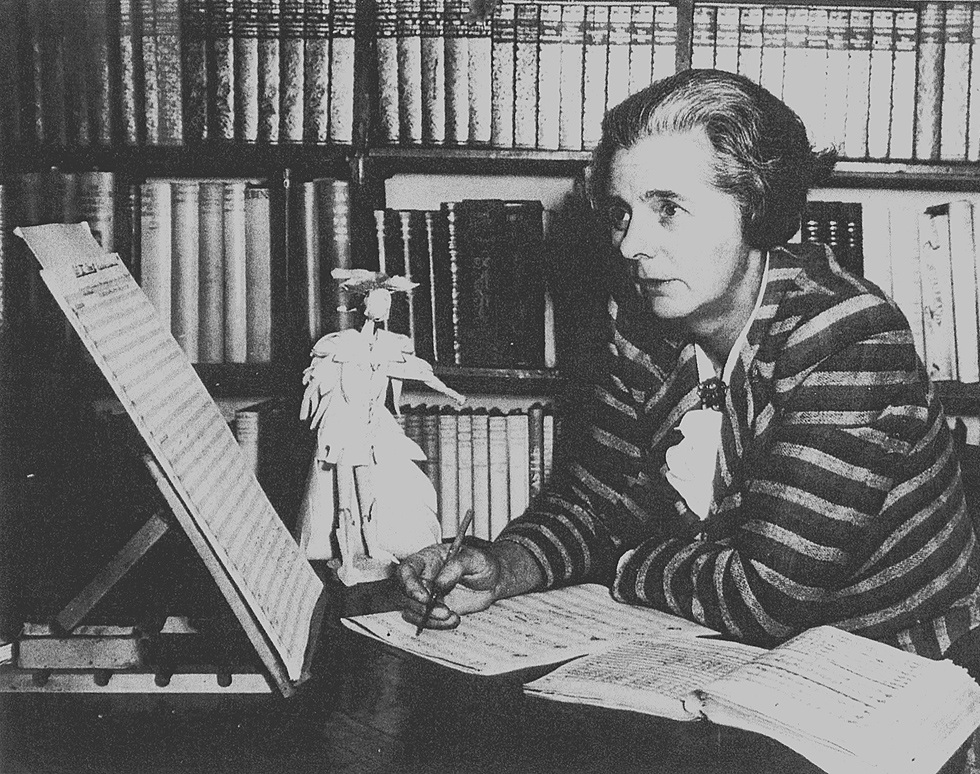
Margaret More

Margaret More (26 June 1903 – 1966) was a British composer.

== Early years ==
Margaret More, often called "Peggy", was born in 1903 to English parents William and Alice More in Crown Lodge in Harlech, North Wales. Her interest in music showed early, but she was not an infant prodigy. It became clear that her main concern was composition; she had no interest whatever in a career as a performer. She was educated at home by a governess, who gave her a grounding in musical theory and encouraged her ambition.

In her early teen-years More became friends with the composer Joseph Holbrooke who at that time was living in Harlech. He introduced her to the work of Debussy and gave her the recently published Préludes and Children's Corner. These had a lasting effect on More's own work. It was also through Holbrooke that she met her future husband Raymond Bantock, who was a writer.

== Career ==
In the mid-1920s Margaret More left Harlech to spend a year in London, where she attended Trinity College of Music and studied composition with Edward d'Evry. It was while living in London that she met poet Claudine Currey, who later became the mother-in-law of More's brother, Jack. Currey had recently written a libretto, The Little Mermaid (pub. Elkin Mathews 1925), based on the 1837 Hans Christian Andersen story, The Sea Maid, and this became the starting point for More's first major work, a grand opera: The Mermaid. She collaborated with the librettist for several years and the opera was finished, unorchestrated and unperformed, in 1929. More would frequently play parts of the work to invited audiences of friends, however. The opera was finally orchestrated in 1950 and performed in its entirety in 1951 by the Barfield Grand Opera Society in Birmingham, as part of the city's contribution to the Festival of Britain.

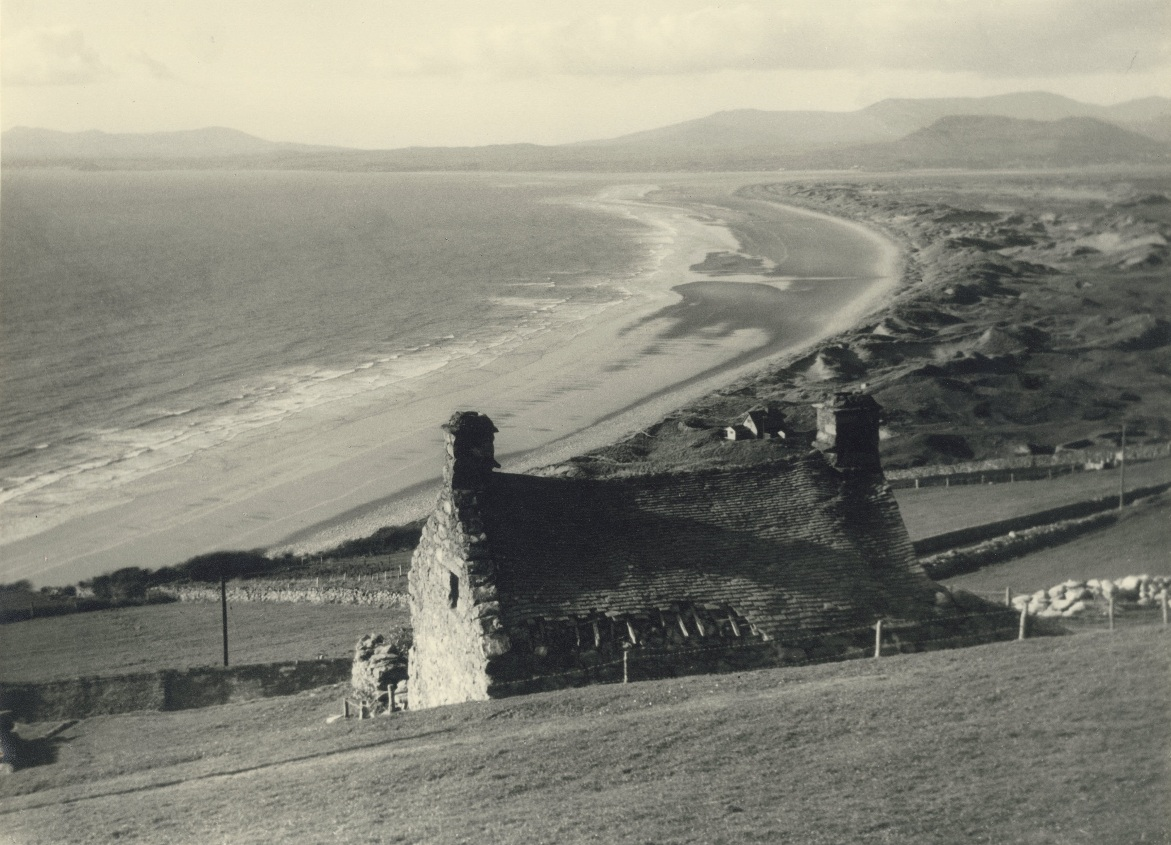
Hen Gaerffynnon - in foreground with a view of Traethdy in distance.

More was called back to Harlech in 1926 to care for her mother, who died the following year. She continued to live at Crown Lodge until she married Raymond Bantock, second son of the composer Granville Bantock, in 1930. Thereafter she spent most of her life in the Midlands at Barnt Green, near Birmingham, where she raised her family. Contact with Harlech was maintained through summer holidays spent at Traethdy in the dunes. Later she restored a stone cottage, Hen Gaerffynnon, to the south of Harlech where she was able to compose in solitude.

During the 1930s and early 1940s the Bantocks raised a family of six children, including Gavin Bantock, a poet. Music took second place but she composed Matris Carmina, a suite of six works for piano and recorder, each piece dedicated to a particular child. During the war the family returned to Harlech for three years, living at Traethdy. The composer ran a school in the village and wrote music for school concerts and a Christmas performance n the Memorial Hall.

In the mid-1940s More returned full strength to music. Her sister-in-law, Myrrha Hawkes, at that time living in South Africa, invited her to compose music for a children's Christmas entertainment based on Hans Andersen's story: The Snow Queen. The story was dramatized and the lyrics written by Michael Martin-Harvey, the son of the actor Sir John Martin-Harvey. Michael Martin-Harvey had been an old friend of Raymond Bantock's, dating from Oxford in the 1920s. This new work was performed during several Christmas seasons in Johannesburg in the late 1940s.

In 1955 the "Sarabande" from this work was awarded first and second prize in the Cheltenham Festival.

== Hans Andersen Players ==
In 1955, More and Martin-Harvey founded the Hans Andersen Players. The idea behind this new departure was based on an early engraving of Andersen reading one of his stories at a table, with listeners sitting round in semi-circle. The image was re-interpreted with Martin-Harvey dressed as Andersen as narrator, with singers, in costume, seated on either side. Martin-Harvey wrote the lyrics and freely adapted the stories for this new art form. Margaret More composed the music for piano, which she played on stage.

The first work to be performed by the Players was a re-casting of The Snow Queen, with its debut in Birmingham, in 1955. Other stories that were adapted over the next few years were The Nightingale, The Swineherd, Old Lukoie, It's Quite True, Punchinello, and Five out of One Pod. The Players performed widely at a range of venues in the Midlands and in Berkshire where Martin-Harvey lived: the Birmingham Repertory Theatre, the Birmingham and Midland Institute and The Birmingham Theatre School, as well as various school halls, village halls and theatres. In 1957 the Players were invited to tour Denmark through the aegis of the Danish Consulate in Birmingham. The tour involved several weeks and most of the larger towns in the country, which much of the time spent in Aarhus.

More's main forte as a composer was work for voice. She composed away from the piano, and as with many songwriters, wrote with a particular singer's voice in mind. A late work, Anthem, is for unaccompanied voice and is a memorial to her fourth son who died in 1957.

Her last major work, The Mouse, was a setting from one of the stories from the Welsh folk lore The Mabinogion. The libretto was by Amabel Williams-Ellis of Portmeirion and the work was first performed by the Players in Coleg Harlech and Portmeirion in 1958. The composer later re-cast the music as a dramatic lay, as 70 minutes of continuous song, without narration.

== Death ==
Margaret More died in 1966. The Players continued their work for a few years, performing in Nottingham and Bristol. The Mouse was performed posthumously several times at the family home in Barnt Green, produced by her fifth son Gavin and costumed by her third son Cuillin.

== List of Principal Works ==
Operas
Title	Libretto	Instrumentation	Year Composed
The Mermaid	Claudine Currey	(i) Orchestra and Voice	1928-29, 1950
The Mermaid		(ii) Piano and Voice	1950
The Mermaid		(iii) Prelude arrangement for four hands	Not Known
The Mermaid		(iv) Mermaids' Chorus arrangement for piano solo	1952

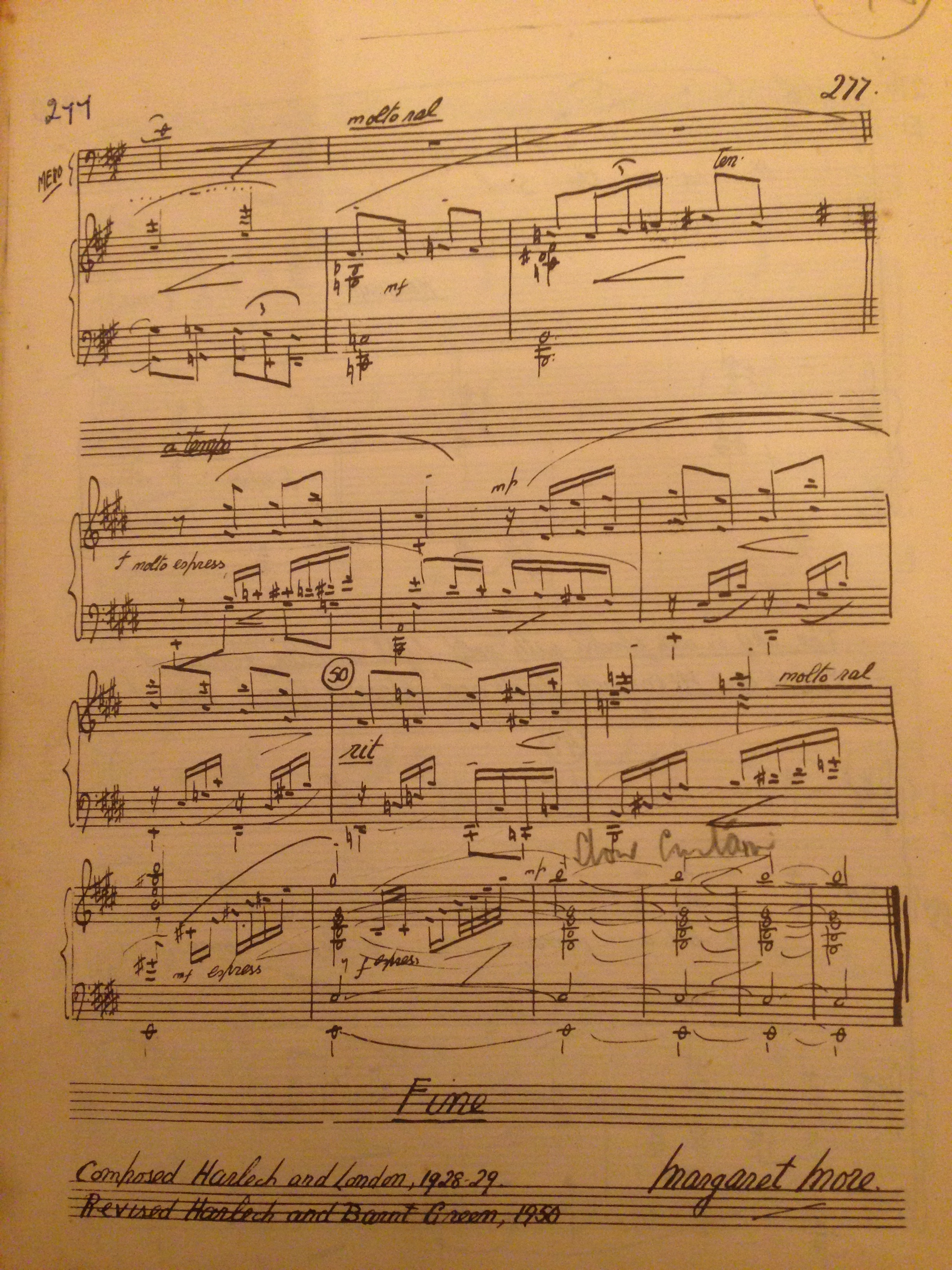
The final page of "The Mermaid"

Ballets
Title	Libretto	Instrumentation	Year Composed
The Shepherd of Myddfai	Christopher Casson	(i) Small Orchestra	c.1945
The Shepherd of Myddfai		(ii) Piano solo	Not known
Medium in White	Myrrha Bantock	Piano	1947

Musical Plays
Title	Libretto	Instrumentation	Year Composed
The Snow Queen	Michael Martin-Harvey	(i) Small Orchestra	1948
The Snow Queen		(ii) Piano Solo	1948
The Snow Queen		(iii) Excerpts for solo piano, two pianos & piano	c.1950

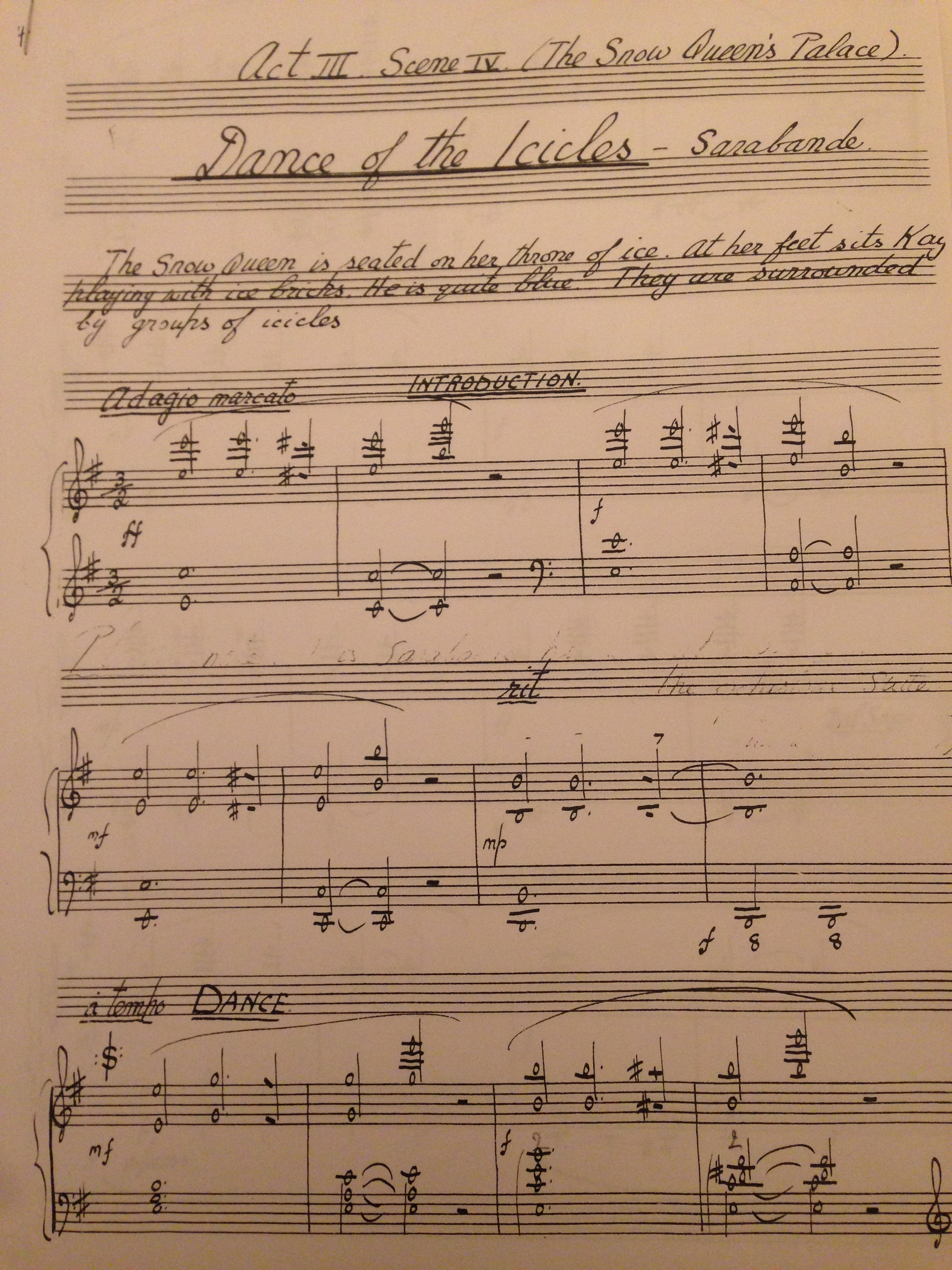
The opening page of the Sarabande from The Snow Queen

Dramatic Lays
Title	Libretto	Instrumentation	Year Composed
The Mouse	Annabel Williams - Ellis	Voice, Piano, Narrator	1956-57
The Mouse		Recast without Narrator	c.1960

Songs
Title	Words	Instrumentation	Year Composed
Anthem	Rufus Ellis	(i) Choir & Organ	1959
Anthem		(ii) Arrangement for unaccompanied voice	c. 1961
Forward	Margaret More (under pseudonym of William Novis)	(i) Mixed voices and orchestra	1951
Forward		(ii) arrangement for voice & piano	1951

=== Other works ===
The Players

Eight arrangements of Hans Andersen stories for Voice, Piano and Narrator between 1955 and 1960

Five out of One Pod,

It’s Quite True!,

Old Luk Oje,

Punchinello,

The Nightingale,

The Princess of the Pea,

The Snow Queen,

The Swineherd

Pianoforte Solo

Nine works composed between 1918 and 1927

Berceuse,

By Moonlight,

Four Myths,

Four Poems,

Harlequin and Columbine (published),

Heather,

Nocturne (published),

Piano Piece No 1,

Sunrise.

Chamber Music

Piano Quartet - Piano, Violin, Viola, Cello - 1932

Piano Trio - Piano, Violin, Cello - 1936

All of Margaret Mores music currently resides in the archive of the Library of Birmingham.
