= Michael Martin Harvey =

British actor (1897–1975)

- in The Third Visitor (1951)
- Born: John Selwyn Elton Martin Harvey; 18 April 1897; London, England
- Died: 30 June 1975 (aged 78); Great Bircham, Norfolk, England
- Other name: Jack Seaforth Elton Martin-Harvey
- Occupation: Film actor
- Years active: 1925–1954

Michael Martin Harvey (birth registered as Jack Seaforth Harvey, baptised as Jack Seaforth Elton Harvey, 18 April 1897 – 30 June 1975) was an English actor. He was the son of the stage actor/manager Sir John Martin-Harvey and brother of actress Muriel Martin-Harvey.

As well as his theatre work, he had a number of small roles in films throughout the 1930s and 1940s such as Dark Journey (1937), The Drum (1938) and Caesar and Cleopatra (1945). Larger parts came his way towards the late forties and early fifties including The Monkey's Paw (1948), The Third Visitor (1951) and The Long Memory (1952). In 1949, he took on his only lead role, that of real life criminal Charles Peace in The Case of Charles Peace.

He married children's book illustrator Hester Margetson in 1927 under the name Jack Seaforth Elton Martin-Harvey. Together, they formed a small ballet touring company, the Martin-Harvey Miniature Ballet. In the 1950s, he teamed with the composer Margaret More to form the Hans Andersen Players, performing selected works by Hans Christian Andersen. Besides dance, his other artistic interests included poetry, painting and pottery.

== Selected filmography ==
- The Robber Symphony (1936)
- The Mutiny of the Elsinore (1937)
- The Drum (1938)
- Let the People Sing (1942)
- Bedelia (1946)
- The Monkey's Paw (1948)
- The Case of Charles Peace (1949)
- Torment (1950)
- The Third Visitor (1951)
- Judgment Deferred (1952)
- The Long Memory (1952)

== Theatre ==
Year	Title	Role	Company	Director	Notes
1943	Holy Isle	Wahwah	The Glasgow Citizens Theatre	Jennifer Sounes	play by James Bridie
