= The Third Visitor =

1951 film

- British trade ad
- Directed by: Maurice Elvey
- Written by: Gerald Anstruther; David Evans
- Based on: play by Gerald Anstruther
- Produced by: Ernest Gartside
- Starring: Sonia Dresdel; Guy Middleton; Karel Stepanek
- Cinematography: Stephen Dade
- Edited by: Helen Wiggins
- Music by: Leighton Lucas
- Production company: Elvey-Gartside Productions
- Distributed by: Eros Films (UK)
- Release date: January 1951
- Running time: 85 minutes
- Country: United Kingdom
- Language: English

The Third Visitor is a 1951 British crime film directed by Maurice Elvey and starring Sonia Dresdel, Guy Middleton and Karel Stepanek. It was written by Gerald Anstruther and David Evans based on the 1950 play of the same name by Gerald Anstruther, and filmed at Merton Park Studios.

== Plot ==
Crook Richard Carling is found murdered. Inspector Mallory investigates and discovers that Carling's business partner's wife's alibi is false. However, Carling is not really dead, having murdered a man who held a grudge against him, and arranged the latter's body to be identified as his own. But soon Carling is really murdered by one of his many enemies.

== Cast ==
- Sonia Dresdel as Steffy Millington
- Guy Middleton as Inspector Mallory
- Hubert Gregg as Jack Kurton
- Colin Gordon as Bill Millington
- Karel Stepanek as Richard Carling
- Eleanor Summerfield as Vera Kurton
- John Slater as James Oliver
- Cyril Smith as Detective Horton
- Michael Martin Harvey as Hewson

== Reception ==
The Monthly Film Bulletin wrote: "Stagey and foolish – particularly in one short scene purporting to depict New York – but with a vigorous performance from Sonia Dresdel."

Picturegoer wrote: "Here we have a British whodunit that slips up on its own red herrings and plunges into the unintentionally comic. The jolt, however, is partly cushioned by a resourceful cast, headed by Sonia Dresdel. Provided you're not too exacting, you may find this story about the phoney murder of an international crook and its widely varied surface action mildly entertaining."

Picture Show wrote: "Murder mystery melodrama that provides quite good entertainment, despite an overload of dialogue ... It is attractively set and well acted, with Sonia Dresdel composed and effective in a dramatic performance with a touch of comedy."

In British Sound Films: The Studio Years 1928–1959 David Quinlan rated the film as "mediocre", writing: "Actors try hard with unconvincing material."
