= Muriel Martin-Harvey =

English actress (1891–1988)

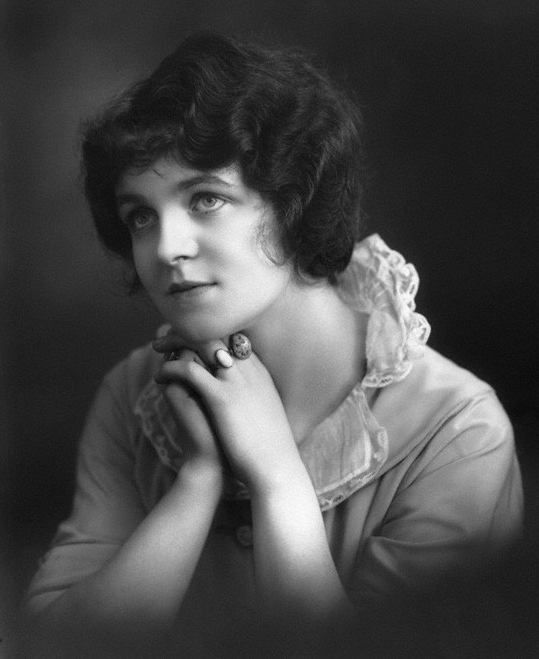
- Muriel Martin-Harvey in 1913
- Born: Margaret Muriel de Melfort Martin-Harvey; 4 October 1891; London, England
- Died: 15 December 1988 (aged 97); Northwood, London, England
- Years active: 1911–1939
- Spouse(s): Ronald Squire (m. 1914; div. 1924) Garry Marsh (m. 1926; div. 1935) Anthony Huntly-Gordon
- Parent(s): John Martin-Harvey; Angelita Helena Margarita (née de Silva)
- Relatives: Michael Martin-Harvey (brother)

Margaret Muriel de Melfort Martin-Harvey (4 October 1891 – 15 December 1988) was an English stage actress.

Martin-Harvey was born in London to actors, London-born Angelita Helena Margarita (née de Silva) and Essex-born Sir John Martin-Harvey. Her brother was the actor Michael Martin-Harvey.

She made her acting debut in 1911 in her father's production of Pelléas and Mélisande at the Lyceum Theatre, London and appeared the following year in The Bear-Leaders. She toured the United States in 1916 as Cyril Maude's leading lady. As well as acting on stage, she played the leading role in two silent films in 1916. She retired in 1939 on the outbreak of World War II.

Martin-Harvey married three times. She first married Ronald Squire on 5 August 1914 and had a daughter with him. They divorced in 1924. On 15 July 1926, she married actor Garry Marsh, an actor 11 years her junior, with whom she toured Australia. She later married Anthony Huntly-Gordon, who was the company and stage manager to the Agatha Christie thriller The Mousetrap at the Ambassadors Theatre for 21 years.

She died in Northwood, London.

== Filmography ==
- The Answer (1916)
- The Hard Way (1916)
