= The Case of Charles Peace =

1949 British film by Norman Lee

- Theatrical release poster
- Directed by: Norman Lee
- Screenplay by: Norman Lee; Doris Davison
- Produced by: John Argyle
- Starring: Michael Martin-Harvey; Chili Bouchier; Valentine Dyall; Bruce Belfrage; Ronald Adam
- Cinematography: Exterior photography: Ted Wooldridge; Moray Grant; Jim Goding
- Edited by: Charles Beaumont
- Music by: Composed & arranged by: Guy Jones
- Production company: Argyle British Productions
- Distributed by: Monarch Film Corporation
- Release date: 30 June 1949 (UK)
- Running time: 88 minutes
- Country: United Kingdom
- Language: English

The Case of Charles Peace (also known as The Trials of Charley Peace and Trials of Charles Peace) is a 1949 British crime film directed by Norman Lee and starring Michael Martin Harvey, Chili Bouchier and Valentine Dyall. The screenplay was by Lee and Doris Davison, based on the real-life Victorian murderer Charles Peace.

== Plot ==
The story of the nineteenth century burglar and murderer Charles Peace is told in flashback in a lecture by Sir Clement Barnes KC at Hendon Police College: Peace's murder of Arthur Dyson, his subsequent false identities, his career as a burglar, and his shooting of a policeman. For these crimes, he is eventually arrested, tried, and sentenced to death by hanging.

== Cast ==
- Michael Martin Harvey as Charles Peace
- Chili Bouchier as Katherine Dyson
- Valentine Dyall as Storyteller Sir Clement Barnes KC
- Bruce Belfrage as prosecution counsel Foster
- Ronald Adam as defence counsel Lockwood
- Roberta Huby as Sue Thompson
- Peter Forbes-Robertson as William Habron
- Kathleen Rooney as Mary
- Richard Shayne as Arthur Dyson
- Jean Shepeard as Hannah Peace
- John Kelly as Father O'Brien
- Peter Gawthorne as Mr. Justice Lopes
- Hamilton Deane as Mr. Justice Hawkins
- Robert McLachlan as Mr. Justice Lindley
- Gordon Court as Inspector Phillips
- Bartlett Mullins as Mr. Brion
- Rose Howlett as Mrs. Brion
- Liam Gaffney as Leresche
- Howard Douglas as Littlewood
- Edward Evans as Police Sergeant (uncredited)

== Reception ==
The Monthly Film Bulletin wrote: "Apart from too many flashbacks within flashbacks, which are apt to confuse, this is a well-made, interesting and wholly absorbing film of an authentic story based on records of British justice. Much of the films success is due to Michael Martin-Harvey's brilliant characterisation of the eccentric, Jekyll and Hyde-like Peace. Chili Bouchier makes a successful come-back as Katherine, and heads an adequate supporting cast."

Kine Weekly wrote: "Michael Martin-Harvey, mincing and menacing in turn, does a sound acting job as Charlie Peace. Chili Bouchier, Jean Shepeard and Roberta Huby are slightly less effective as Mrs. Dyson, Mrs. Peace and Sue Thompson, respectively."

Picture Show wrote: "Thoroughly entertaining within its modest limits is this reconstruction of the amazing career of Charles Peace ... Michael Martin-Harvey gives a compelling performance as the sinister little man."

In British Sound Films: The Studio Years 1928–1959 David Quinlan rated the film as "average", writing: "Good central performance holds the attention."
