= Cuillin Bantock =

British painter and zoologist

Cuillin Bantock (born 29 July 1935) is a British abstract painter and zoologist. He lives and works in London, UK. Bantock worked as a professional environmentalist in London and elsewhere. His main interest was evolutionary ecology and his children's book The Story of Life published in 1983, is in the collections of more than 100 libraries in 2016.

== Early life ==
Bantock was born in Barnt Green, Worcestershire, son of Raymond Bantock and Margaret More. His grandfather was classical composer Sir Granville Bantock. Bantock read zoology at Oxford University from 1955 to 1958 and was then awarded a three-year Christopher Welch Scholarship of the University for research in developmental cytogenetics. MA and D.Phil. degrees were awarded to him in 1965.

In 1961, he studied painting for three years at Camberwell College of Art in London.

== Career ==
Bantock worked as a research supervisor and senior lecturer in genetics at the Polytechnic of North London from 1966 to 1989. He was a member of The Field Studies Council Executive Committee and consultant advisor to the Science Research Council (UK), the National Environmental Research Council (UK) and the National Science Foundation (USA) c. 1975–1985. He was a member of the London Wildlife Executive Council 1985–1989.

His main research area was in the ecological genetics of gastropod molluscs, on which he published over 20 papers in the international scientific literature. He contributed to several scientific books. His The Story of Life published by Walker Books Ltd in 1983 is included in The Museum of Science and Industry Basic List of Children's Science Books.

After his retirement in 1989, Bantock became a full-time painter. A lifelong familiarity with a particular North Welsh dune system is a constant preoccupation in all his work, both abstract and figurative. His work has been exhibited in the UK, Canada and USA. He was the co-founder of Harlech Biennale 1994 and between 1994 and 2006 he has curated and co-curated more than 40 exhibitions in a number of venues in the UK, and organized art sales. He is the author of several exhibition catalogues and essays.

He was artist adviser to Space from 1996 to 2004 and was co-founder member, company secretary and trustee of The Art in Perpetuity Trust from 1995 to 2015. He engaged in successful fund-raising from the Arts Council and other bodies.

Since 2014 he has been represented by Richeldis Fine Art.

== Publications ==
- The Story of Life was published by Walker Books (1983)
- In Defence of Reality 1994, Catalogue Essay for Made in Greenwich 1974–1994 for Greenwich Artists’ *Studios Association; final exhibition (30pp).
- Two Painters 1998, Exhibition Essay
- 30+ 1999, Catalogue Essay for four painters (4pp).
- The Poetics of Colour and Space 1999, Catalogue Essay for one painter (3pp).
- Disruptive Tendencies 2001, Catalogue Essay for one painter (13pp)
- Letter to Artichoke 2004
- Bounty – A Case of Preposterous Optimism 2007. Two catalogue essays: Voyage (1p) and A Nice Point in Time (2pp)
- Essay for Painters on McLean, in John McLean. Ian Collins, pub Lund Humphries 2009
- Yes, but I don't know why, Catalogue essay for Geoffrey Rigden retrospective at Poussin Gallery 2012
- Never Lukewarm. EM Publishing (2012)
- A Musical Wanderer EM Publishing (2018)
- Landscapes in the Grain - Recollections of a Zoologist-Painter, First Servant Books (2021)

== Solo exhibitions ==
- Paintings, Galerie Marie, London 1991
- Recent Work, Oriel Senig Contemporary Arts, Harlech 1994
- New Paintings, The Cut Gallery, London 1994
- Beyond the View, Homerton Hospital (Exhibition organised by The Whitechapel Art Gallery), London 1994
- Outcome of a Journey, Grand Forks Art Gallery, Grand Forks, B.C., Canada 1998
- Looking Out, deliART, London 1999
- Emma Lake, deliART, London 2000
- New Paintings, The Gestalt Centre, London 2001-’02
- Ten Years – Work on Paper, Ardudwy Gallery, Harlech 2002
- 70 – 10, APT Gallery, London 2005
- Cool Departure and other paintings, 2007–2008. SE 1 Gallery, London 2008
- Reprise, Original Gallery, London 2010
- Approach to a View, Highgate Gallery, London 2011
- The Horsebox Gallery 2014
- Beachcomber. APT Gallery 2015
- Wayfarer. Linden Hall, Deal 2019
