= Nell de Silva =

English actress (1865?–1949)

Angelita Helena Maria de Silva Ferro
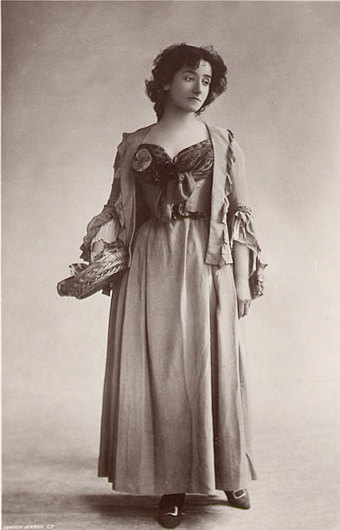
- Born: 1865/1867 (most likely, disputed and unconfirmable); Chile
- Died: 1949; Surrey, England, UK
- Other name: Miss N. de Silva or Nell de Silva
- Occupation: Actor
- Spouse: John Martin-Harvey (m. 1889)
- Children: Muriel Martin-Harvey; Michael Martin-Harvey

Angelita Helena Margarita, Lady Martin-Harvey (née Ferro; 28 August 1865/1867 – 29 March 1949) was an English actress, known by such stage names as Miss N. de Silva or Nell de Silva.

== Biography ==
Although her parents, Don Ramon de Silva Ferro, a Chilean consul, and his wife, Caroline Milliken, had married in England in 1883, she was born, most likely in Chile, sometime during the 1860s. She was reluctant to reveal her true age. At her marriage at the beginning of 1889 to actor John Martin-Harvey, she claimed to be 21. She became a leading lady of her husband's theatre troupe. They met at a performance of Goethe's Faust at Cambridge. The couple had two children: Muriel and Michael, both actors, like their parents.

During World War I, she and her husband toured the UK, giving military recruitment lectures and raising money for the Red Cross and other charities, most notably the Nation's Fund for Nurses. They raised enough money to buy a building for the College of Nursing in 1920, which became a rest home for nurses.

Lady Martin-Harvey died from undisclosed causes on 29 March 1949, in Surrey, England.
