= The Monkey's Paw (1933 film) =

1933 American horror film

- Theatrical release poster
- Directed by: Wesley Ruggles; Ernest B. Schoedsack (uncredited)
- Screenplay by: Graham John; W. W. Jacobs; Louis N. Parker
- Based on: "The Monkey's Paw" by W. W. Jacobs
- Produced by: Pandro S. Berman; Merian C. Cooper
- Starring: Ivan F. Simpson; Louise Carter; C. Aubrey Smith
- Cinematography: Edward Cronjager; Jack MacKenzie; J.O. Taylor; Leo Tover
- Edited by: Charles L. Kimball
- Music by: Max Steiner (uncredited)
- Production company: RKO Radio Pictures
- Distributed by: RKO Radio Pictures
- Release date: January 13, 1933
- Running time: 58 minutes
- Country: United States
- Language: English
- Budget: $100,000

The Monkey's Paw is a 1933 American pre-Code horror film co-directed by Ernest B. Schoedsack (prologue) and Wesley Ruggles, based on the short story "The Monkey's Paw" (1902) by W. W. Jacobs. It tells of a family who obtains a cursed monkey paw that grants three wishes. Because the film was shorter than anticipated after the initial shooting, the producers added a prologue. Though the film was not widely viewed upon its release in the United States, it was well-liked in England. Critical reviews were mixed, ranging from an appreciation of its suspense to a dislike of its plot, particularly its deus ex machina ending. It has been considered a lost film, but parts of it were rediscovered in 2016.

== Plot ==
During a blizzard, veteran Sergeant major Tom Morris tells stories of his travels to India to his friends John and Jenny White. He tells them of a monkey paw he obtained from a Hindu fakir. The paw grants three wishes, but the fakir has warned Tom that the wishes will ultimately lead to regret. Nura, an Indian native, used the paw to find love, but people died instead. Tom tells the Whites about the dangerous properties of the paw. Tom then shows them the paw. As Tom prepares to leave, John slips the paw from his coat. John tells Jenny that he stole the paw as a joke and declares that he does not believe any harm will come of it. When their son, Herbert, finds out about the paw, John tells him the same thing. They joke about the paw before Herbert leaves for his night shift at the electrical plant. After Jenny goes to bed, John takes out the paw and wishes for £200 to purchase a house for Herbert and Herbert's fiancée, Rose. He thinks that he will be safe making a wish that will benefit someone else.

The next morning, Mr. Samson, a lawyer, visits the Whites and tells them that, while laughing and telling his coworkers about the monkey's paw, Herbert lost his balance, fell into machinery, and died. Mr. Samson then gives them the insurance compensation, which amounts to £200. Jenny and Rose rebuke John for his wish. After the funeral, Jenny uses the paw to wish for Herbert to come back to life. The Whites hear a knock at their door, and believe it is Herbert. John realizes that Herbert will still be mutilated from the accident. Before Jenny can open the door, John wishes for Herbert to be dead again. No one is at the door when Jenny finally opens it.

John wakes up and realizes that everything was a dream. He learns that Herbert has been promoted to become a supervisor in the electrical plant and is going to marry Rose.

== Cast ==
- Ivan F. Simpson as John White
- Louise Carter as Jenny White
- C. Aubrey Smith as Sergeant Major Tom Morris
- Bramwell Fletcher as Herbert White
- Betty Lawford as Rose Hartigan
- Winter Hall as Mr. Hartigan
- Herbert Bunston as Samson
- Nina Quartero as Nura
- Nigel De Brulier as Hindu Fakir
- Lal Chand Mehra as Indian lover
- J.M. Kerrigan as Corporal O'Leary

== Production ==
Based on the short story of the same name by W. W. Jacobs and the 1922 play by Louis N. Parker, The Monkey's Paw was a film produced by RKO. The studio secured rights to the story on August 13, 1932, and shooting likely began in the late summer. Alan Mowbray was originally cast as Sgt. Maj. Tom Morris. His involvement was announced in August, but for unknown reasons other than the studio's statement that Mowbray was ill, he was replaced by C. Aubrey Smith. The film's executive producer, Merian C. Cooper, selected an all-British main cast except for Carter, who was already an established mother figure in films. Filmmaker David Selznick also participated in the casting process. The film's dream ending was similar to the ending in the 1923 film of the same name.

In September 1932 The Film Daily announced that British freelancer Graham John had completed the script, a month after he was contracted to write it. Originally, the script was written so that Morris would undergo a series of flashbacks as he told his story to the Whites. However, the film, which ran at thirty minutes, was shorter than the producers anticipated. To make it longer, they wrote a prologue set in India with additional characters. Cooper recruited Shoedsack to direct this addition to the film. After adding the prologue, the film team removed the parts containing Morris's flashbacks in order to avoid redundancy. Casting for the prologue began in November. By the time it was finished the film cost about $150,000. It was Ruggles' last film with RKO.

The music, written by Max Steiner, includes an early version of Ann Darrow's theme in King Kong (1933).

== Release and critical reception ==
Because the film was horror, RKO decided to release it on Friday the 13th. It was released on January 13, 1933, in the United States of America and on January 1, 1936, in France. In April 1965 CBS-TV showed a modified version on The Alfred Hitchcock Hour. In this version, the Whites' names are changed to Paul, Anne, and Howard. They obtain the monkey paw from a gypsy while on a trip. The rest of the plot remains the same as that in the RKO production. Before the film was released, Motion Picture Herald suggested strategies by which the studio could secure a steady attendance. Suggestions included advertising in British communities and building up the singularity of the monkey's paw by comparing it to other magical charms, such as four-leaf clovers.

Upon its release, viewers enjoyed The Monkey's Paw because they considered it distinctive. However, it was not long enough to be shown on its own or be popular, though it enjoyed some success in England. One reviewer wrote that it was "not a picture for the general audience and too labored for the art theatres." Picturegoer stated that the film was a "somewhat embellished" version of the short story and was "tense and effective". Rushton Daily Leader wrote that the film was "a thrilling action drama", calling it "one of the most absorbing pictures of the year". Cinema Booking Guide Supplement wrote that it was "Excellent general entertainment with possible exception of squeamish patrons." Ralph Wilk of The Film Daily predicted that, while the film would be "fair drama" for Americans, it would hold more appeal with British audiences because of the predominantly British cast. Wilk also praised the "staging, direction and photography" and called the cast "very efficient". The cast was criticized by Harry Burns of Hollywood Filmograph for poor annunciation and "over acting". Burns additionally noted that the dialogue was "uninteresting" and the editing was low-quality, making the plot "jumpy". Mentioning the music score, he wrote that "Max Steiner...labored hard and uselessly to help lift this opus out of the dumps". In its review Variety called it a "noble experiment which didn't jell". While calling the staging "ambitious", Variety criticized the dream ending and wrote that the prologue was unrelated to the rest of the film. The International Photographer criticized the "sombre mood" and "lack of a dominant screen personality" in the cast. It also praised the methods of light and dark lighting used in the production.

== Rediscovery ==
The Monkey's Paw was regarded as a lost film until indications of its continuance, such as stills, appeared on the internet in 2016. A shortened version of the film dubbed in French survives.
