= Monkey Fist =

Monkey Fist may refer to:

- Monkey's fist knot
- Monkey Kung Fu
- Lord Monty Fisk, a villain known as "Monkey Fist" on the Disney animated series Kim Possible; see List of Kim Possible characters

== See also ==
- The Monkey's Paw (disambiguation)
