= The Lady of the Barge =

1902 short story collection by W. W. Jacobs

- Cover U.S. 1st edition, Dodd Mead, N.Y., 1902
- Author: W. W. Jacobs
- Illustrator: Maurice Greiffenhagen; James Frank Sullivan
- Cover artist: Amy Richards
- Language: English
- Genre: Crime, horror, humour, romance
- Publisher: Dodd, Mead and Company
- Publication date: October 1902
- Publication place: United Kingdom
- Media type: Print
- Pages: 300

The Lady of the Barge, also published as The Lady of the Barge and Other Stories, is an anthology of short stories by W. W. Jacobs, first published in 1902 by Dodd, Mead and Company. The first edition includes illustrations by Maurice Greiffenhagen and James Frank Sullivan, with a cover created by Amy Richards.

== Stories ==
#	Title	Originally published in
1	"The Lady of the Barge"	August 1900 issue of Harper's Magazine
2	"The Monkey's Paw"	September 1902 issue of Harper's Magazine
3	"Bill's Paper Chase"	May 1901 issue of The Strand Magazine
4	"The Well"	Previously unpublished
5	"Cupboard Love"	May 1901 issue of Harper's Magazine
6	"In the Library"	June 1901 issue of Harper's Magazine
7	"Captain Rogers"	February 1901 issue of Harper's Magazine
8	"A Tiger's Skin"	Previously unpublished
9	"A Mixed Proposal"	January 1901 issue of Harper's Magazine
10	"An Adulteration Act"	September 1900 issue of Harper's Magazine
11	"A Golden Venture"	October 1900 issue of Harper's Magazine
12	"Three at Table"	Previously unpublished

== Synopses ==
=== "The Lady of the Barge" ===
John Gibbs, the captain of the Arabella, is winding down from an argument relating to religion when Ted, his mate and brother-in-law, hops aboard. Ted wants to take Lucy Harris on a ride aboard the barge. Although John is skeptical about the passenger, since he doesn't normally carry them, he reluctantly lets her on. As the trip unfolds, Lucy takes a liking to John, to Ted's dismay.

When John goes to finally dock in Coalsham, seeing his wife Louisa before him, he attempts to hide Lucy in the forecastle. This fails, and Louisa gets in an argument with Lucy, mistaking her presence as that her husband cheated on her. This leads to Lucy throwing her purse into the water. Ted jumps into retrieve it. John, thinking he's drowning, jumps in to save him. When they are pulled ashore by the two ladies, their foolishness is recognized by the two women as they walk away and get breakfast.

=== "Bill's Paper Chase" ===
The story takes place in a nested narrative from the perspective of an unnamed night watchman as he monologues the story.

Thomas Geary, the skipper of the Grenada, passes away due to old age at sea on a voyage from Sydney to London. The unnamed night watchman and Bill are eager to inherent Thomas' wealth of £160,000 (equivalent to $17,003,187 in 2025), when they find out that Thomas gave it away to his assistant steward, a sixteen-year-old boy named Jimmy. Thomas says on his deathbed that he gave the money to Jimmy to throw it overboard. Panicking, Bill asks Jimmy if he did it. Jimmy says he did, but Bill has suspicions.

After an interrogation down in the forecastle, Bill and the night watchman learn that Jimmy did not throw it overboard. Whether, whilst he was cleaning the second mate's mattress, he discovered a hole and stuffed the money into the mattress. Eager to get the cash, Bill goes to the second mate and offers him a pound for the mattress, to supposedly keep as a souvenir of the trip. The mate declines, but accepts after Bill offers him more than a pound.

When they land ashore in London, the second mate gives Bill the mattress. Bill cuts it open, and after searching through the stuffing, he finds the money to not be there. Confused, he goes back on the boat to search for the boy. Nevertheless, the boy is missing.

=== "The Well" ===
Jem Benson and Wilfred Carr are smoking cigarettes on a long day when Wilfred asks Jem for money, a sum of £1,500 (equivalent to $159,405 in 2025). He needs it in two weeks or else he will get deported, which Jem refuses. Wilfred reveals that he found Olive's, Jem's wife, letters that Jem sent, complete with his signature. He remarks that "they are not at all in the best possible taste." Wilfrid is willing to sell them to Jem for £1,500. Jem grabs him by the collar and tells him to get rid of the letters, but Wilfred retaliates and threatens to double the price. Jem reluctantly lets go, and Wilfred leaves to let Jem think about it.

The next day, when Jem and Olive are walking around in Mrs. Benson's backyard, Olive gets startled because she thought she heard a call for help down an old, deep well behind some tall grass nestled in the forest-line. She loses her bracelet as it tumbles down into the well as she swears to Jem that she heard the call again. As the evening turns to night, she jokingly suggests Jem to get a fishing line down the well, and that's what he does when she goes inside. With the lack of light, he leaves the line and sleeps till morning.

The next morning, Jem goes outside to find Ben and his assistant, George, looking down the well. Ben is preparing to dip out into the well, and after Jem reluctantly helps them, by hooking up a candle and pulling it down, Jem hooks Ben and he dips into the well. For a minute, all is silent until Jem feels a tugging on the line. Ben yells for Jem to pull the line up, and when they do Ben's remains are pulled back up, he having died from mysterious forces.

=== "Cupboard Love" ===
Martin Bodfish, a retired cop turned farmer, is spending an evening at the Neggets' farm to discuss a golden brooch that disappeared earlier that morning. Eventually, after some talk he narrows it down to one suspect: Mrs. Driver, who had stopped by the house earlier that morning. Mr. Negget defends Mrs. Driver, stating that he's known her for thirty years. Bodfish tries to convince Mr. Negget to invite her back for tea and interrogation, but he declines. Mr. Negget gets made fun of by the detective, resulting in a scornful relationship. Bodfish concludes that, despite the fact it is unlawful, he should search her cabin while she is away.

The next day, when Bodfish sees Mrs. Driver and Mrs. Clowes leave, he goes into the house to look for the brooch. Unknowingly, however, Mr. Negget brews up some alcohol and convinces the ladies to come back to the cottage to share a drink with them. The unexpected return of the women forces Bodfish into a larder. Mrs. Driver opens the pantry and becomes startled by Bodfish, and nearly faints.

At the end of the story, it's revealed that the brooch was lodged in behind a drawer against the wall.

=== "In the Library" ===
Trayton Burleigh and James Fletcher own an apartment on the third floor which in the back is part library, study, and smoke-room. They inherited it from a long-line of men about ten years ago. James is kicking out Trayton because he believes that Trayton is well enough on his own, and no longer wants to share it with him anymore. James offers Trayton £200 to leave the next day, to which Trayton reacts negatively. As Trayton walks away he picks up a katana off a nearby ivory and murders James with it.

Storming away from the scene hastily, Trayton begins to think how worse it could get for him. He doesn't want to make any "elementary" mistakes on the scene of the crime, since he dictates that's how most criminals are caught. Reluctantly, he goes back to his home and picks up a revolver. However, he scarily notices how the library door, which he remembers distinctly closing, is slightly open by five or four inches. He closes the hallway door to the library, only to hear the cries of a man inside demanding to be let out. Trayton rushes outside and a sergeant happens to be walking by, and he calls him inside.

The sergeant charges into the door, breaking it off the latches and accessing the prisoner. The sergeant and Trayton seat next to each other as the sergeant interrogates the prisoner. The prisoner urges he hasn't been there for even ten minutes. The sergeant puts the prisoner in cuffs and turns to Trayton, pointing at his revolver and telling him he doesn't need it. Trayton gives his revolver to the man without a second thought. The sergeant then points out how one of Trayton's wrists look broken. Confused, Trayton shows both of his wrists side by side. The sergeant swiftly places handcuffs over Trayton's wrists as he goes over to James' body and pulls the katana out of his breast. He sits next to him, questioning and getting information as Trayton watches.

=== "Captain Rogers" ===
Nick Gunn walks into the "Golden Key" inn. He walks into the coffee room and demands the landlord. The waiter initially declines, but due to the stranger's commanding demeanour he gets the landlord, a fellow by the name of Mullet Rogers. Nick Gunn was previously the mate of Mullet Rogers, and Nick has been searching everywhere for Rogers since. Nick demands housing, new clothes, food, and money. Roger declines and tells him to leave, but Nick responds by pulling out his pistol and demanding him to sit and talk it out. As they talk, Rogers' step-daughter walks in, but promptly leaves after she spots Nick. Nick is able to get a room with Rogers and his step-daughter and also supper. He eats the supper in the coffee-room, gets shown to his room, and falls asleep.

Nick awakes the next morning, eating breakfast with the family. Nick learns that Joan, the stepdaughter, has no mother and is in need of a husband.

Nick is able to gain part-time ownership to the inn through threats, and over the course of a little under a month is making money as Mullet's authority begins to slip away. Nick hires his own crude women and men. Joan watches with horror as the place begins to decline in popularity. It frightens Mullet so much one night that he is placed into cardiac arrest. Nick, meaning to inherent the dying man's wealth, begs to him on his deathbed to know where his money is. Mullet demands that a nurse be watching, to which Nick gets one and drugs her and places her by the fireplace. Mullet asks to see his stepdaughter, to which Nick says that he'll marry her if Mullet tells him where the money is.

Suddenly, Mullet begins to contort in his bed. He tells Nick that he had decided to kill him at the moment Nick's first threat, then chokes him to death; he had been feigning illness. Then he places the dead Nick in his room and makes it look as though he has been murdered and robbed. Returning to his bed, he awaits the morning.

=== "A Tiger's Skin" ===
A painter is making a new sign for a bar called Cauliflower in a town called Claybury. An old man watches the painter as he tells a story. On a trip to a nearby town called Wickham, a roadside circus driving by on a train brakes down. They set up in Claybury, hoping to make business. It succeeds, and they pack up after a week. For a week there was silence, before one night at the Cauliflower before Bill Chambers reads that the tiger has gone loose. They close the pub's doors, just as a tramp comes begging to be let in. Herbert Smith, the owner of the Cauliflower, locks the door and declines the tramp's insistence to be let in. John Briggs, the blacksmith, comes from the back kitchen, wondering what the matter is. Enraged by Herbert's ruckus, John grabs Herbert's gun from off the wall and demands to be let outside to hunt the tiger. Herbert refuses, so John slaps him on the side of the head with the stock of the gun. Herbert falls to the ground, fainting as the tramp rushes through the door. The tramp explains that the tiger chased him for over a mile, and that he saw it while washing his shirt in a creek over a hedge.

For the next week or so, Claybury is under constant threat of the tiger. Kids don't go to the school and men and women are afraid to go to work. Sooner or later, livestock starts getting killed off. Frederick Scott, a hen keeper, finds most of his hen slaughtered in the night by the tiger. He reports it to William White, the local policeman. The next day, Peter Gubbins' pigs are found dead. All panic is let loose for about a week. No one can really decipher what to do until George Kettle organizes a militia in the Cauliflower after his ducks are found dead. The men––Herbert Smith, John Briggs, Bill Chambers, Peter Gubbins, the narrator, and George Kettle––bring two guns, pitchforks, and scythes to the forest as they walk along the path. Eventually, George and his men encounter an old man walking alongside the road. The old man tells that the tiger went into the house of Bob Pretty, the so-called black sheep of Claybury who declined legitimacy of a tiger around.

The men go up and break into Bob Pretty's house. Bob Pretty, confused, is wondering what is going on when the men smell something pungent. They open the kitchen door and find out that Bob's kitchen is essentially a butcher shop; pork and duck bodies are hung on meathooks. The men insist that they will get Bob for his crimes, and demand someone to go get Mr. White. Bob tells them that they won't press charges, because the militia broke into his house. Ultimately no charges are pressed, and its revealed at the end that Bob Pretty and the tramp were friends.

== Adaptations ==
"The Monkey's Paw" has been adapted for film, television and theatre, and has inspired musical works and literary retellings.

== Reception ==
The Nassau Literary Magazine praised the collection's ability to be comedic "but also exceptionally clever," and its ability to "produce tales which are in themselves miniature tragedies." They highlight the collection's heart lighted humorous stories, whilst also giving praise to the serious and more tragic tales, specifically calling out "The Monkey's Paw," "An Adulteration Act," and "Captain Rogers". They went more in-depth into "The Monkey's Paw," comparing it to the likes of Edgar Allan Poe.

The Spectator praised the comedic stories, but criticizing its inconsistent tone throughout with the unlikely mix of comedy and tragedy, ultimately saying comedy takes more a balance in the collection.

Punch praised the humorous stories in the collection, though not without saying that Jacobs proved himself "a 'master of craft' in the direction of creepiness." They recommended the collection for Jacobs' genuine sense of humor rather than for his horror and crime.
