= The Monkey's Paw =

1902 horror short story by W. W. Jacobs

- Short story by W. W. Jacobs

Text available at Wikisource
- Country: United Kingdom
- Language: English
- Genres: Horror, short story

Publication
- Published in: Harper's Monthly
- Publisher: Harper and Brothers, New York and London
- Media type: Magazine
- Publication date: September 1902

"The Monkey's Paw" is a horror short story by English author W. W. Jacobs. It first appeared in Harper's Monthly in September 1902, and was reprinted in his third collection of short stories, The Lady of the Barge, later that year. In the story, three wishes are granted to the owner of an enchanted monkey's paw, but the wishes come with an enormous price for interfering with fate.

It has been adapted many times in other media, including plays, films, TV series, operas, stories and comics, as early as 1903. It was first adapted to film in 1915 as a British silent film directed by Sidney Northcote. The film (now lost) starred John Lawson, who also played the main character in Louis N. Parker's 1907 stage play.

== Plot ==
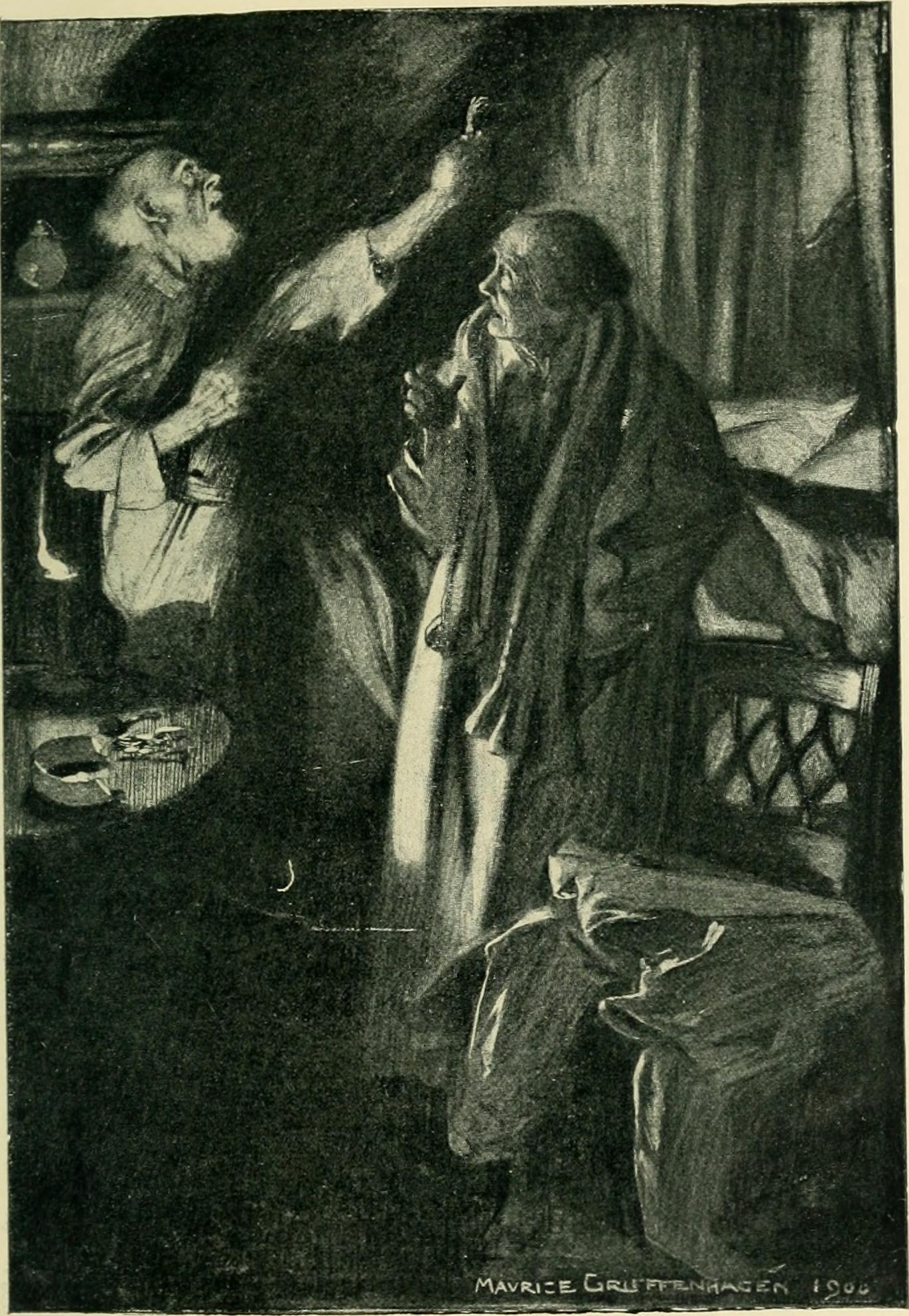
Illustration for "The Monkey's Paw" by Maurice Greiffenhagen, from Jacobs' short story collection The Lady of the Barge (1902)

Mr. and Mrs. White and their grown son, Herbert, are visited by Sergeant-Major Morris, a friend who served with the British Army in India. During dinner, he introduces them to a mummified monkey's paw. He explains how an old fakir has placed a spell on the paw so it will grant three wishes, but only with hellish consequences as punishment for tampering with fate. Morris, having had a horrible experience using the paw, throws it into the fire, but the sceptical Mr White retrieves it. Before leaving, Morris warns Mr White of what might happen should he use the paw.

Mr White hesitates at first, believing that he already has everything he wants. At Herbert's suggestion, Mr White flippantly wishes for £200, which will enable him to make the final mortgage payment for his house; he then drops the paw, saying it moved and twisted like a snake. The following day, Herbert leaves for work. That night, a representative of Herbert's employer arrives at the Whites' home, telling them that Herbert has been killed in a terrible accident that mutilated his body. The company denies any responsibility, but tenders a bereavement payment to the family of £200.

A week after the funeral, Mrs White, mad with grief, insists that her husband use the paw to wish Herbert back to life. Reluctantly, he does so, despite great unease at the thought of summoning his son's mutilated and decomposing body. Later that night, there is a knock at the door. As Mrs White fumbles at the locks in a desperate attempt to open the door, Mr White becomes terrified and fears that the thing outside is not the son he loved. He makes his third and final wish. The knocking stops, and Mrs White opens the door to find that no one is there.

== Adaptations ==
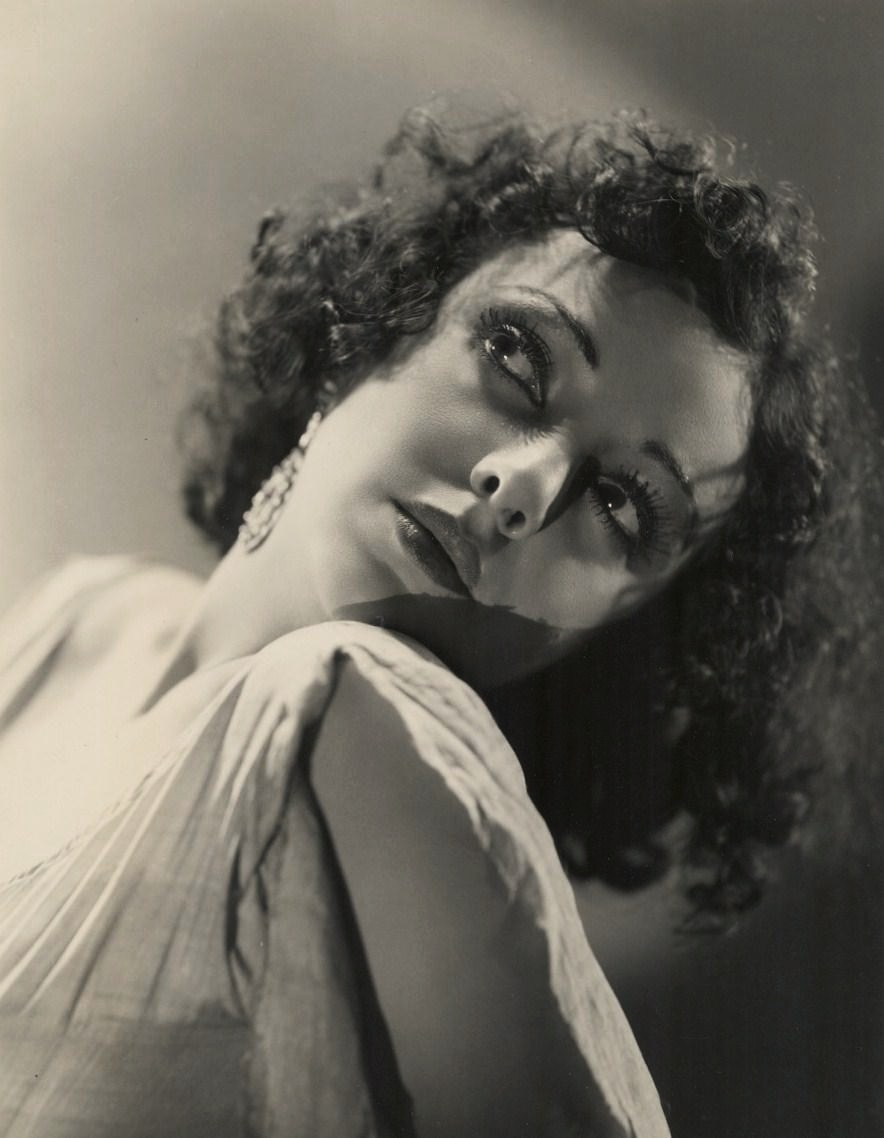
Nina Quartero in a publicity still from the 1933 American film version

The story has been adapted into other media many times, including:

- On 6 October 1903, a one-act play opened at London's Haymarket Theatre, starring Cyril Maude as Mr White and Lena Ashwell as Mrs White.
- A 1907 British stage adaptation by Louis N. Parker starred John Lawson.
- A 1915 British silent film version was directed by Sidney Northcote and starred John Lawson (who was in the 1907 stage play).
- A 1919 British silent film (director unknown) is known to have been made but is now considered lost.
- The Monkey's Paw is a 1923 British film directed by Manning Haynes and starred Moore Marriott, Marie Ault, and Charles Ashton.
- A 17 July 1928 British radio adaptation was based on the 1907 play.
- The Monkey's Paw, a 1933 American film with screenplay by Graham John and directed by Wesley Ruggles (his last film with RKO), starred C. Aubrey Smith, Ivan Simpson, and Louise Carter. The film was considered lost until pictures from it were posted online in 2016; the existing copy is dubbed in French.
- A 28 May 1946 episode of the BBC Radio series Appointment with Fear.
- The Monkey's Paw, a 1948 British film with screenplay by Norman Lee and Barbara Toy.
- A 16 December 1958 episode of the British radio series Thirty-Minute Theatre, starring Carleton Hobbs and Gladys Young.
- A 1961 Mexican film version called Espiritismo (released as Spiritism in the US), directed by Benito Alazraki and starring Nora Veyran, Jose Luis Jiminez, and Jorge Mondragón.
- "The Monkey's Paw – A Retelling" aired on American television on 19 April 1965 in season 3, episode 26, of The Alfred Hitchcock Hour, starring Leif Erickson, Jane Wyatt, and Lee Majors.
- An episode of the 1970s British television series Orson Welles Great Mysteries.
- The 1972 horror film Deathdream directed by Bob Clark was adapted from the story as an allegory to the Vietnam war by screenwriter Alan Ormsby.
- An 11 July 1980 episode of the Canadian CBC Radio series Nightfall.
- A 17 January 1988 BBC Radio adaptation by Patrick Galvin, presented as part of Fear on Four; rebroadcast individually as a Halloween special on 31 October 1993.
- A half-hour televised special broadcast on the UK's Channel 4 in 1988, directed by Andrew Barker and starring Alex McAvoy and Patricia Leslie.
- The 1991 pilot episode of the TV series Are You Afraid of the Dark? ("The Tale of the Twisted Claw") parodies the story.
- A 1991 episode of the TV series The Simpsons, "Treehouse of Horror II", has members of the Simpsons family making wishes using a cursed monkey's paw. After watching a rerun of the episode, Curry Barker was inspired by Lisa's monkey paw nightmare to incorporate a wish element into his 2025 film Obsession.
- A 1993 episode named Taveez of the Indian television series The Zee Horror Show.
- A 2004 episode of Brandy & Mr. Whiskers (season 1, episode 11b - "The Monkey's Paw").
- A 2004 adaptation as a radio play narrated by Christopher Lee in 2004 as part of the BBC radio drama series Christopher Lee's Fireside Tales.
- A 2008 Nepali film, Kagbeni, is a loose adaptation of the story.
- A 2013 American film version with screenplay by Macon Blair, and directed by Brett Simmons.
- A 2017 American opera, The Monkey's Paw, by composer Brooke deRosa, and produced by Pacific Opera Project.

== Reception ==
The Nassau Literary Magazine praised "The Monkey's Paw" whilst reviewing The Lady of the Barge, comparing it to the works of Edgar Allan Poe and saying it was "calculated to give thrills and tremors to the most indifferent reader."

Stephen King quotes from the story in his 1983 horror novel Pet Sematary about the reanimation of corpses in a pet cemetery.

== See also ==
- Hand of Glory
- "The Monkey"
- Rabbit's foot
- The Lathe of Heaven
- Three wishes
- Unintended consequences
- Pet Sematary
