= The Monkey's Paw (1948 film) =

- Film titles
- Directed by: Norman Lee
- Screenplay by: Norman Lee
- Based on: The Monkey's Paw by W.W. Jacobs
- Produced by: Ernest G. Roy
- Starring: Milton Rosmer; Michael Martin Harvey; Joan Seton; Megs Jenkins
- Cinematography: Bryan Langley
- Edited by: Inman Hunter
- Music by: Stanley Black
- Production company: Butcher's Empire Films
- Distributed by: Butcher's Film Service
- Release date: 1 November 1948
- Running time: 64 minutes
- Country: United Kingdom
- Language: English

The Monkey's Paw is a 1948 British second feature ('B') horror film directed by Norman Lee and starring Milton Rosmer, Michael Martin Harvey, Joan Seton and Megs Jenkins. The screenplay was by Lee and Barbara Toy based on the 1902 story "The Monkey's Paw" by W. W. Jacobs. It was produced by Ernest G. Roy.

== Plot summary ==
A magic Monkey's Paw grants its owner three wishes before a disaster befalls them as punishment for tampering with fate.

== Cast ==
- Milton Rosmer as Mr. Trelawne
- Megs Jenkins as Mrs. Trelawne
- Michael Martin Harvey as Kelly
- Eric Micklewood as Tom Trelawne
- Brenda Hogan as Beryl
- Mackenzie Ward as Noel Lang
- Joan Seton as Dorothy Lang
- Norman Shelley as Monoghan
- Alfie Bass as Roberts, the speedway track manager
- Rose Howlett as Mrs. Gurney
- Hay Petrie as Grimshaw
- Sydney Tafler as the dealer
- Patrick Ward as Sergeant Lawson
- Vincent Lawson as Morgan

== Critical reception ==
The Monthly Film Bulletin wrote: "The "story within a story", which deals with the marital tragedy related by Kelly, is well done, but it seems to result in detracting somewhat from the climactic intensity of the later tragedy, that of the Trelawnes, which is painstakingly built up with every possible effect of horror and suspense as Mrs. Trelawne imagines the imminent entrance of her dead son. Milton Rosmer as Trelawne and Megs Jenkins as the bereaved mother are the mainstay of the film. The remainder of the cast, though adequate, fail to approach the same standard of excellence."

Kine Weekly wrote: "Macabre melodrama, primarily addressed to the superstitious. Based on W. W. Jacobs's classic, it comes to the screen with the strongest credentials, but, unhappily, those responsible for its production have not left well alone. Clumsily embellished to make full-feature footage it repeatedly drifts from its point and baffles much more frequently than it thrills."

In British Sound Films: The Studio Years 1928–1959 David Quinlan rated the film as "mediocre", writing: "Old chiller loses most of its sting in this version."

The Spinning Image called it "a creaky diversion with stagey acting and an obvious lack of funds to open it out, yet the strength of Jacobs' yarn was such that it showed through even the most impoverished of tellings."

On his website Fantastic Movie Musings and Ramblings, Dave Sindelar commended the film for its character development and climax which he called "suitably tense and eerie".
