= John Martin-Harvey =

English stage actor (1863–1944)

Sir John Martin-Harvey
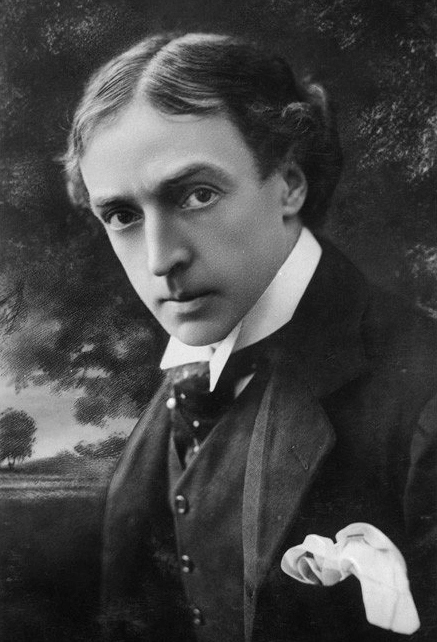
- Born: 22 June 1863; Wivenhoe, Essex, United Kingdom
- Died: 14 May 1944 (aged 80); East Sheen, Richmond, Surrey, United Kingdom
- Occupation: actor-manager

Sir John Martin-Harvey (22 June 1863 – 14 May 1944), known before his knighthood in 1921 as John Martin Harvey, was an English stage actor-manager.

== Biography ==
=== Early life ===
Born in Bath Street, Wivenhoe, Essex, he was the son of John Harvey, a yacht-designer and shipbuilder, and Margaret Diana Mary (née Goyder). His father expected him to follow his own profession, but Martin Harvey had his sights set on the stage. One of his father's clients was the dramatist W.S. Gilbert, and it was through Gilbert that young Martin Harvey met his first teacher, John Ryder.

== Early career ==
Martin Harvey joined Henry Irving's Lyceum Theatre company in 1882. For many years he played only minor parts in Irving's productions. His most famous play was first produced at the Lyceum on 16 February 1899. This was The Only Way, an adaptation of Charles Dickens' A Tale of Two Cities in which Martin Harvey played the lead role of Sydney Carton. Many other plays followed and many tours in both Great Britain and North America. His success was always greater in Canada than the United States.

After Irving's death in 1905, Martin Harvey continued to revive his old manager's plays, often using Irving's own props which he had bought. These plays included The Bells and The Lyons Mail. His early successes included Pelleas in Maeterlinck's Pelleas and Melisande, with Mrs. Patrick Campbell as Melisande and incidental music written for the production by Gabriel Fauré. His later successes included A Cigarette-maker's Romance, Oedipus (in Max Reinhardt's Covent Garden production), Shaw's The Devil's Disciple and Maeterlinck's The Burgomaster of Stilemonde. By the time he retired, Martin Harvey claimed to have performed The Only Way more than 3,000 times, though this would not have been possible in reality.

Early on in Irving's company, when cast as the attendant to the messenger in the scene with Beatrice in Much Ado About Nothing, Martin Harvey decided that here was his opportunity to be more than a mere extra with a non-speaking part. "I bought a remarkable feather", he explained, "and wore it in my hat, and on the day of the dress rehearsal I painted on my face a very elaborate moustache. Alas! my efforts were unavailing. I expect in Irving critical eyes I was a figure of fun. Irving pointed his lean forefinger at me, and with that dreadful preliminary, 'Ha, hm,' of his, he growled. Take out that boy.' I had to come on with the crowd as usual."

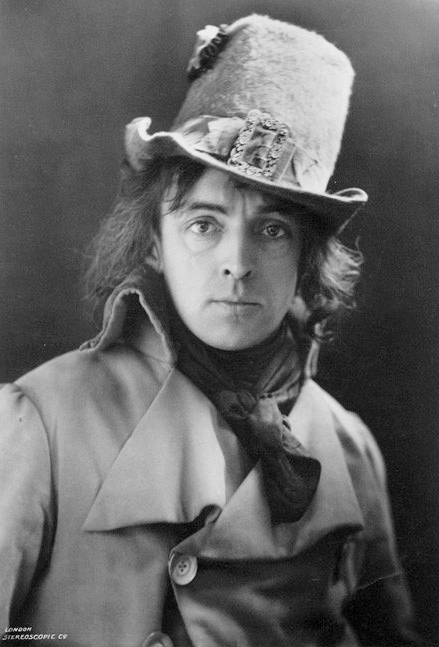
John Martin-Harvey in 1899

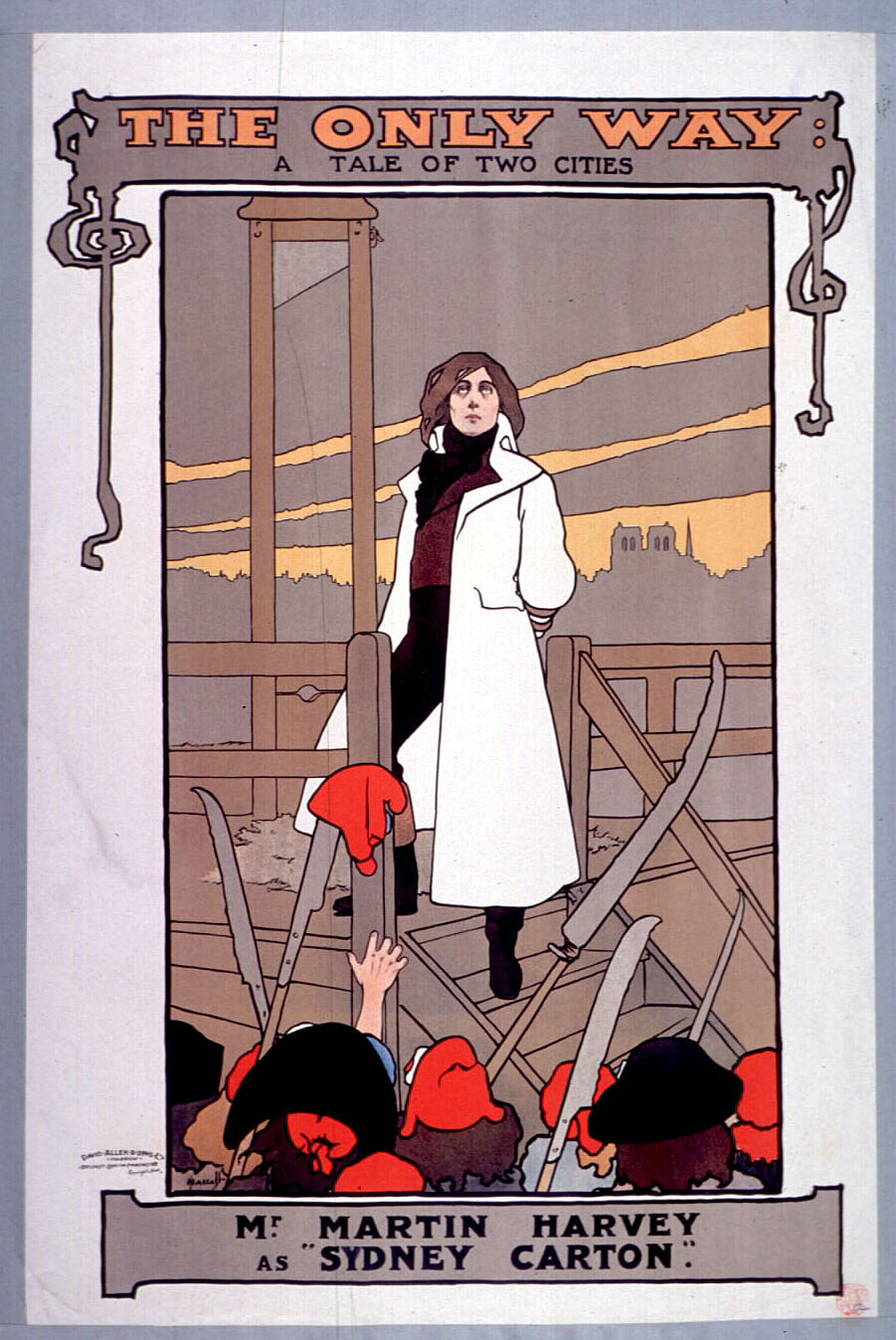
John Martin-Harvey as Sidney Carton (1899)

== "The Only Way" ==
Martin Harvey and his wife Angelita worked on an adaptation of A Tale of Two Cities, later involving playwright Freeman Wills and Irish clergyman Canon Frederick Langbridge. There was already a play called Sidney Carton, or a Tale of Two Cities and it was Angelita who came up with the title The Only Way. The Only Way was made into a film in 1927 shot at Twickenham Studios and was a commercial success, and starred Martin Harvey in the lead role.

== Business interests ==
One of Martin Harvey's personal friends was theatre manager, William Morton. In 1902 Morton's Ltd was formed to build the Alexandra Theatre in Hull. Martin Harvey was made one of five directors, investing £1,000, and remained so until the theatre was sold in 1935. Martin Harvey and his touring company paid an annual visit to Hull and to Morton's theatres, which also included the Theatre Royal and The Grand Opera House.

== First World War ==
During the First World War, Martin Harvey and his wife toured the country giving military recruitment lectures and raising money for the Red Cross and other charities, most notably the Nation's Fund for Nurses. The couple raised enough money to buy a building for the College of Nursing in 1920, which became a rest home for nurses.

== Personal life ==
In 1889 he married Angelita Helena Maria de Silva Ferro, daughter of a Chilean consul and a fellow actor in Irving's company who used the stage name Miss N. de Silva. They had two children, Muriel Martin-Harvey and Michael Martin-Harvey, both successful actors. John Martin Harvey died at his home in East Sheen, Richmond, Surrey, aged 80.

== Selected filmography ==
- A Cigarette-Maker's Romance (1913)
- The Broken Melody (1916)
- The Breed of the Treshams (1920)
- The Only Way (1927)
- The Burgomaster of Stilemonde (1929)
- The Lyons Mail (1931)

== Bibliography ==
- Busby, Brian: Character parts: who's really who in Canlit. Toronto: Knopf Canada, 2003
- Butler, Nicholas: John Martin-Harvey: the biography of an actor-manager. Wivenhoe: Nicholas Butler, 1997.
- Disher, Maurice Willson: The last romantic: the authorised biography of Sir John Martin-Harvey. London: Hutchinson, 1948
- Edgar, George: Martin Harvey: some pages of his life. London: Grant Richards, 1912.
- Martin-Harvey, John, Sir: The book of Martin Harvey. London: Henry Walker, 1930.
- Martin-Harvey, John, Sir: The autobiography of Sir John Martin-Harvey. London: Sampson Low, 1933.
