= Charles Peace =

English burglar and murderer (1832–1879)

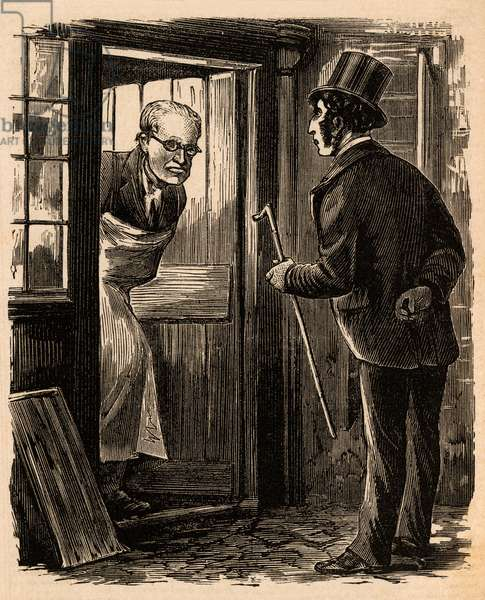
- Illustration of Charles Peace (left), from The Adventures of a Notorious Burglar (1879)
- Born: 14 May 1832; Darnall, Sheffield, England
- Died: 25 February 1879 (aged 46); Armley Prison, England
- Cause of death: Execution by hanging
- Burial place: Armley Gaol
- Occupation: Criminal
- Father: John Peace

Charles Peace (14 May 1832 – 25 February 1879) was an English burglar and murderer, who embarked on a life of crime after being injured in an industrial accident in a steelworks when he was 14 years old, when a hot steel rod entered his leg. He had a lifelong limp after the accident.

After killing a policeman in Manchester, he fled to his native Sheffield, where he became obsessed with his neighbour's wife, eventually fatally shooting her husband. Settling in London, he carried out multiple burglaries before being caught in the prosperous suburb of Blackheath, wounding the policeman who arrested him. He was linked to the Sheffield murder, and tried at Leeds Assizes. Found guilty, he was hanged at Armley Gaol. His story has inspired many authors and film makers.

== Early life and crimes ==
Charles Peace was born on 14 May 1832, in Darnall, Sheffield. He was the youngest son of shoemaker John Peace and his wife Jane, a naval surgeon's daughter. Peace attended schools in Pitsmoor, Dinnington and Paradise Square, before becoming an apprentice at Millsands in Sheffield. At age fourteen, Charles was permanently crippled in an accident at a steel-rolling mill.

In 1854, he was found guilty of multiple burglaries and sentenced to four years' penal servitude. In 1859 he married a widow named Hannah Ward. Soon afterwards he committed a major burglary in Manchester, nearly killing a police officer who came to arrest him, and was sentenced to six years' penal servitude.

For a while after this, Peace seems to have concentrated on his picture-framing business. He then began working on the North Eastern Railway, from which he was sacked for absenteeism. After moving back to the Sheffield suburb of Darnall, Peace made the acquaintance of a civil engineer named Arthur Dyson.

== First murder ==
At Whalley Range, Manchester, Peace was seen by two policemen entering the grounds of a house on 1 August 1876, about midnight. One, PC Nicholas Cock, intercepted him as he was trying to escape. Peace took out his revolver and warned Cock to stand back. The policeman came on. Peace fired, but deliberately wide of him. Cock drew his truncheon, and Peace fired again, this time seriously wounding Cock, who died on 2 August.

In the dark, Peace escaped; two brothers living nearby, John and William Habron, were arrested and charged with the killing of Constable Cock. At Manchester Assizes, John Habron was acquitted for lack of evidence, but William Habron was sentenced to death, later commuted to penal servitude for life. Peace made a point of attending the trial to confirm that he was not a suspect before returning to Darnall.

== Dyson's murder ==
In the meantime, Peace had developed an obsessive interest in Dyson's wife Katherine, though it was never established how far she may have returned his feelings. In June 1876, Dyson threw a card into the garden of Peace's house, reading: "Charles Peace is requested not to interfere with my family."

On 1 July, Peace approached Katherine and allegedly threatened to 'blow out her brains and those of her husband'. Dyson took out a summons against Peace, and moved to a different suburb, Banner Cross. On their first day in the new house, 29 November, Katherine was accosted by Peace, who said "You see, I am here to annoy you, and I'll annoy you wherever you go."

That evening, a little after eight o'clock, Peace observed Katherine coming out from her back door and entering the outside toilet. When she duly emerged, he confronted her with a revolver, shouting "Speak or I'll fire." In terror, she retreated to the outhouse, and her husband came out to investigate. Peace fled down the passage, where Dyson followed him. Peace fired twice at Dyson, the second shot passing fatally through his temple. As Katherine cried "Murder!", Peace escaped and made his way by train to Hull, where his wife kept an eating-house.

== On the run ==
There was an immediate hue and cry, with a price of £100 on his head. The police issued an inaccurate description that had to be altered. Peace was changing his appearance, concealing his missing finger with a prosthetic arm, and moving around the country to try to avoid detection. In Nottingham, he met Mrs Sue Thompson, who became his mistress. (Sue Thompson ultimately betrayed Peace's whereabouts to the police, who however denied her the £100 reward on the grounds that her evidence did not lead directly to Peace's conviction). In early 1877, they moved to London, where Peace felt safer from arrest. He sent for his wife and son, Willie, to join him in Peckham.

Among his favourite hunting-grounds was the affluent suburb of Blackheath, where a rash of burglaries was noted with alarm. It was here that Peace was finally caught. On 10 October 1878, at about 2 am, Constable Edward Robinson saw a light appear suddenly in a window at the back of a house in St John's Park. He and his colleague Constable William Girling waited at the back window while their colleague Sergeant Charles Brown rang the bell and knocked on the front door. Peace tried to escape through the garden, and fired four shots at Robinson, who closed on him and managed to hold him, even though a fifth shot had passed through his arm.

== Prosecution ==
Peace was remanded for a week, in which he refused to give his name. However, while in captivity he wrote a letter to a business colleague who decided to co-operate with police. The colleague revealed its author as Peace, writing under his pseudonym John Ward. Under that name, he was tried at the Old Bailey for burglary and the attempted murder of PC Robinson. The evidence against the prisoner was clear, and he was sentenced by Justice Henry Hawkins to penal servitude for life.

From Pentonville prison, where he was serving his sentence, Peace was taken to Sheffield, where he appeared before the stipendiary magistrate at the Town Hall and was charged with the murder of Dyson. As Mrs Dyson's cross-examination was adjourned to the next hearing, Peace was taken back to London to await the second hearing. However, the hearing had to be adjourned for a further eight days: on the journey back to Sheffield, Peace jumped from the train near Kiveton Park and was found unconscious beside the track. According to another account, Peace only attempted to jump and was restrained by a warden.

Declared fit to stand trial, Peace appeared for his second examination before the magistrate. His solicitor, William Clegg, tried to prove that Mrs Dyson had been on more intimate terms with Peace than she was ready to admit, and that Dyson had been the aggressor in a struggle in which Peace had reacted in self-defence. A number of pencilled notes had been found near the scene, which appeared to have been written by Mrs Dyson, indicating a close relationship with Peace, though she denied having written them. (At the Coroner's inquest after the murder, she said her husband had seen them and declared them to be forgeries, possibly by Peace himself.) After the hearing, Peace was committed for trial at the Leeds Assizes, to begin on 4 February 1879.

== Trial ==
Mr Thomas Campbell Foster Q.C. led for the prosecution; future Solicitor-General Frank Lockwood led for the defence. Both men protested to the jury at the sensational rumours being peddled by the press, which appeared to prejudice a fair trial—a sentiment heartily endorsed by Peace, who called out "Hear, Hear!"

Again, Mrs Dyson denied her husband had attacked Peace, and as she was the only witness to the shooting, there was no one to contradict her statement. However, she admitted that she and Peace had been seen together on various occasions and that her husband had objected to the friendship.

Several other witnesses claimed to have seen Peace in the neighbourhood on the night of the murder, and a labourer named Brassington testified that Peace had accosted him in the street, vowing to shoot "those strange folks before morning" and walking off towards Dyson's house. Brassington was a stranger to Peace, but he had seen him at close quarters under a gas-lamp and a full moon; thus, he was able to swear to his identity. The revolver taken from Peace at his arrest was produced, and it was shown that the rifling of the bullet extracted from Dyson's head was the same as that of the bullet fired from the revolver.

Mr Justice Lopes, summing up, said it had been clearly proved that no struggle had taken place before the murder and emphasised that the jury must do their duty to the community by the oath they had sworn. Ten minutes after they retired, the jury returned with a verdict of guilty. Asked if he had anything to say, Peace reportedly replied, "It is no use my saying anything." The judge passed sentence of death, to be carried out in Armley Gaol (later HMP Leeds) on 25 February.

== Execution ==
Execution of Peace by William Marwood – 1879 waxwork in the Chamber of Horrors at Madame Tussauds London

Having nothing more to lose, Peace made a full confession to the murder of Constable Cock in order to exonerate William Habron, who was later given a free pardon and £800 compensation.

Peace re-asserted that Mrs Dyson had been his mistress, but she strenuously denied this, calling him a demon "beyond the power of even a Shakespeare to paint" who persecuted her with his attentions and, when he found them rejected, devoted all his malignant energies to making the lives of her husband and herself unbearable. According to Peace's story, he was a slighted lover who had been treated by Mrs Dyson with ingratitude.

On the day before his execution Peace was visited for the last time by his family; out of deference to their feelings, he did not ask to see Mrs Thompson, though he had very much wished to. He seemed in good spirits, and knelt with them and prayed for half an hour. He then blessed each one singly, and gave way to tears as they left his presence.

On the morning of his execution, Peace ate a hearty breakfast of eggs and salty bacon and calmly awaited the coming of the public executioner, William Marwood, inventor of the "long drop". He was escorted on the death-walk by the prison chaplain, who was reading aloud from The Consolations of Religion about the fires of hell. Peace burst out "Sir, if I believed what you and the church of God say that you believe, even if England were covered with broken glass from coast to coast, I would walk over it, if need be, on hands and knees and think it worthwhile living, just to save one soul from an eternal hell like that!" Peace was buried in Armley Gaol. He was 46 years old.

== In popular culture ==
=== Theatre ===
- The Life and Adventures of Charles Peace (1927) A play in which John Ellis appeared in the role of hangman after his own retirement from that profession.

=== Films and TV ===
- The Life of Charles Peace, "IMDB". IMDb. (Sep' 1905, UK, b & w, silent, 14 '), by William Haggar, starred many members of Haggar's family.
- The Life of Charles Peace "IMDB". IMDb. (Nov 1905, UK, b & w, silent) by Frank Mottershaw
- The Case of Charles Peace "IMDB". IMDb. (1949, UK, b & w) by Norman Lee
- In the Beatles film, A Hard Day's Night, Paul's grandfather (Wilfrid Brambell) reports the arrest of Ringo to the studio by saying "The police have the poor lad in the Bridewell – he'll be pulp by now!" shortly after the police have referred to the cheeky Ringo as "Charlie Peace" suggesting that this usage refers to the Leeds Bridewell, allegedly haunted by the ghost of Charlie Peace.
- Peace is mentioned and features at Madame Tussauds museum in the 1969 Special Branch episode, 'You Don't Exist'.

=== Literature ===
- Anonymous, Charles Peace or, The Adventures of a Notorious Burglar, circa 1879–1880. London: G. Purkess. 100 parts.
- Mark Twain alludes to Peace's arrival in paradise in his story Extract from Captain Stormfield's Visit to Heaven.
- Ward, David (1963) King of the Lags: the Story of Charles Peace. London: Elek Books
- Wallace, Edgar (1931) The Devil Man (a fictionalised account of Peace's later career with some accurate details of his trials and execution—available from Project Gutenberg Australia)
- "The Astounding Adventures of Charlie Peace" was serialised in UK comic Buster in the 1960s and 1970s. Although initially set in the Victorian era, in one episode Charlie is sent through time to modern day London by an inventor who had disguised his time machine as a safe.
- Peace is mentioned by name in the Sherlock Holmes short story "The Adventure of the Illustrious Client".
- Charles Peace is mentioned in relation to the public's appetite for crime as entertainment in the P. G. Wodehouse novel A Gentleman of Leisure, also known as The Intrusion of Jimmy – "One of these days, we shall have Arthur playing Charles Peace to a cheering house." Also in Wodehouse's "The Pothunters": "Think how Charles Peace would have behaved under the circumstances." And in Wodehouse's Sam the Sudden in reference to the house that the protagonist Sam Shotter rents: "It may interest you to know that a very well-known criminal, a man who might be described as a second Charles Peace, once resided in the very house which you are renting."
- Peace is referenced in 'The Birds Fall Down', and 'The Fountain Overflows', by Rebecca West.
- Peace is referenced in 'The Lodger' by Marie Belloc Lowndes.

=== Music ===
- In 2018 Leeds pop group Steve Woods and the Hoods released the 'Sh*t Pub Sessions' EP featuring the song 'Charles Peace'.

== Sources ==
- Original text from A Book of Remarkable Criminals by H.B. Irving, published in 1918 (public domain), which in turn cites:
  - Charles Peace, or the Adventures of a Notorious Burglar – A large volume published at the time of his death; gives a full and accurate account of the career of Peace side by side with a story of the Family Herald type, of which he is made the hero.
  - The Life and Trial of Charles Peace (Sheffield, 1879)
  - The Romantic Career of a Great Criminal (by N. Kynaston Gaskell, London 1906)
  - The Master Criminal (London, 1917/18? ["recently" as of 1918])
  - A Book of Scoundrels (by Charles Whibley)
- Charles Peace, or The Adventures of a Notorious Burglar (an ebook)
