= W. W. Jacobs =

English fiction writer (1863–1943)

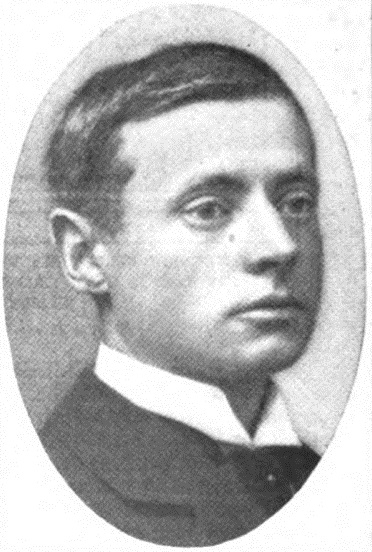
- Portrait of Jacobs by Elliott & Fry
- Born: William Wymark Jacobs; 8 September 1863; London, England
- Died: 1 September 1943 (aged 79); Islington, London, England
- Occupations: Short story writer, novelist
- Writing career
- Period: 1885–1943

William Wymark Jacobs (8 September 1863 – 1 September 1943) was an English author of short fiction and drama. He is best known for his story "The Monkey's Paw".

== Early life ==
He was born in 1863 at 5, Crombie's Row, Mile End Old Town (not Wapping, as is often stated), London, to William Gage Jacobs, wharf manager, and his wife Sophia. His father managed the South Devon wharf in Lower East Smithfield, by the St Katherine Docks and, according to the Oxford Dictionary of National Biography, "the young Jacobs spent much time on Thames-side, growing familiar with the life of the neighbourhood" and "ran wild in Wapping". Jacobs and his siblings were still young when their mother died. Their father then married his housekeeper and had seven more children, including illustrator Helen Jacobs. Jacobs attended a private London school before Birkbeck College (Birkbeck Literary and Scientific Institution, now part of the University of London), where he befriended William Pett Ridgcap.

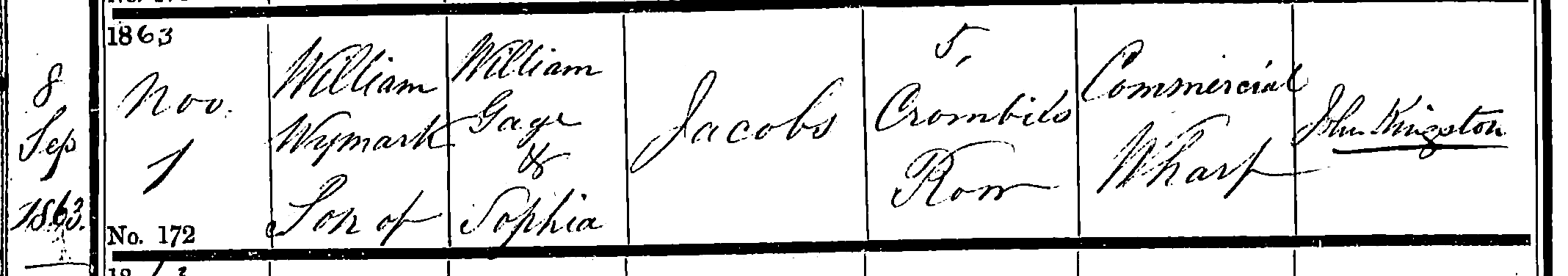
Jacobs' baptism record

== Early work ==
In 1879, Jacobs began work as a clerk in the Post Office Savings Bank. By 1885 he had his first short story published, but success came slowly. Yet Arnold Bennett in 1898 was astonished to hear that Jacobs had turned down £50 for six short stories. He was financially secure enough to be able to leave the Post Office in 1899.

== Literature ==
Jacobs is remembered for a macabre tale, "The Monkey's Paw", (published 1902 in a short-story collection, The Lady of the Barge) and several other ghost stories, including "The Toll House" (from the 1909 collection Sailors' Knots) and "Jerry Bundler" (from the 1901 Light Freights). Most of his work was humorous. His favourite subject was marine life – "men who go down to the sea in ships of moderate tonnage", said Punch, reviewing his first collection, Many Cargoes, which gained popular success on publication in 1896.

Michael Sadleir has said of Jacobs's fiction, "He wrote stories of three kinds: describing the misadventures of sailor-men ashore; celebrating the artful dodger of a slow-witted village; and tales of the macabre."

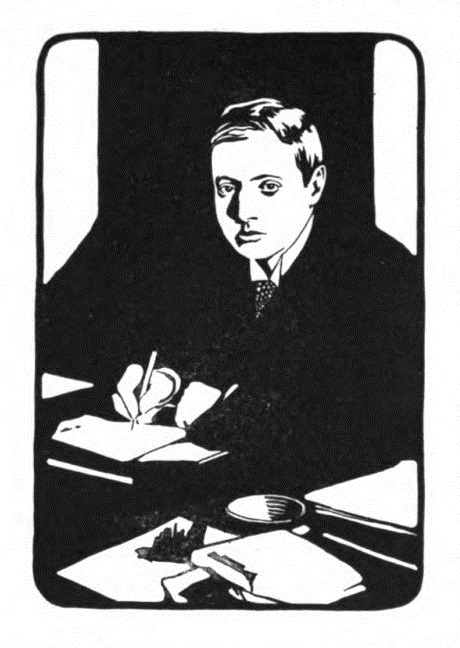
W. W. Jacobs

Many Cargoes was followed by the novel The Skipper's Wooing in 1897, and another collection of short stories, Sea Urchins (1898), confirmed his popularity. Other titles included Captains All, Sailors' Knots, and Night Watches. The title of the last reflects the popularity of an enduring character: the night-watchman on the wharf in Wapping, recounting the preposterous adventures of his acquaintances Ginger Dick, Sam Small, and Peter Russet. These three characters, pockets full after a long voyage, took lodgings together, set on enjoying a long spell ashore, but the crafty inhabitants of dockland London soon relieved them of their funds, assisted by their own fecklessness and credulity. Jacobs showed a delicacy of touch in his use of the coarse vernacular of the East End of London, which attracted the respect of P. G. Wodehouse, who mentions Jacobs in his autobiographical work Bring on the Girls!, written with Guy Bolton and published in 1954.

The stories in Many Cargoes had varied previous serial publication, while those in Sea Urchins were for the most part published in Jerome K. Jerome's Idler. From October 1898, Jacobs's stories appeared in The Strand, which provided him with financial security almost up to his death.

John Drinkwater described Jacobs's fiction as "in the Dickens tradition".

== Dramatic work ==
Jacobs's short-story output declined somewhat around the time of the First World War. His literary efforts thereafter were mainly adaptations of his own short stories for the stage. His first stage work, The Ghost of Jerry Bundler, opened in London in 1899, was revived in 1902, and was eventually published in 1908. He wrote 18 plays altogether, some in collaboration with other writers.

== Adult life ==
Jacobs married Agnes Eleanor Williams in 1900 at West Ham, Essex. Agnes was later a noted suffragette. The 1901 Census records their living with a first child, a three-month-old daughter, at Kings Place Road, Buckhurst Hill, Essex. Also recorded in the household were his journalist sister Amy, his sister-in-law, Nancy Williams, a cook, and an additional domestic servant. Altogether the Jacobses had two sons and three daughters.

Jacobs went on to set up home in Loughton, Essex, first at the Outlook in Park Hill, and then at Feltham House in Goldings Hill, which bears a blue plaque to him. Loughton is the "Claybury" of some of the stories; Jacobs's love for the local forest scenery features in "Land Of Cockaigne". Another blue plaque appears on Jacobs's central London residence at 15 Gloucester Gate, Regents Park (later held by the Prince of Wales's Institute of Architecture).

Jacobs stated that after his youthful left-wing opinions, his political position in later years was "Conservative and Individualistic".

On 7 January 1914, in King's Hall, Covent Garden, Jacobs was a member of the jury in the mock trial of John Jasper for the murder of Edwin Drood. At this all-star event G. K. Chesterton was Judge and George Bernard Shaw appeared as foreman of the jury.

In 1928 he was involved in the creation of films of his works. The first film made was titled The Bravo. Fifty actresses were auditioned and Jacob was said to be impressed by Paddy Naismith who was chosen to play the lead role.

Jacobs died on 1 September 1943 at Hornsey Lane, Islington, London, at the age of 79. An obituary in The Times (2 September 1943) described him as "quiet, gentle and modest ... not fond of large functions and crowds." Ian Hay remarked, "He invented an entirely new form of humorous narrative. Its outstanding characteristics were compression and understatement."

== Bibliography ==
=== Novels ===
- The Skipper's Wooing (novel) and The Brown Man's Servant (novella), 1897
- A Master of Craft, 1900
- At Sunwich Port, 1902
- Dialstone Lane, 1904
- Salthaven, 1908
- The Castaways, 1916

=== Short story collections ===
- Many Cargoes, 1894
- More Cargoes, 1897 (released as Sea Urchins in US, 1899)
- Light Freights, 1901
- The Lady of the Barge, 1902 contains The Monkey's Paw
- Odd Craft, 1903 contains The Money Box
- Captains All, 1905
- Short Cruises, 1906
- Sailors' Knots, 1909 contains The Toll House
- Deep Waters, 1911
- Night Watches, 1911
- Ship's Company, 1911
- Sea Whispers, 1926

=== Drama ===
The Ghost of Jerry Bundler (1899)

=== Short stories ===
- "Mrs Bunker's Chaperon", Henry's Christmas Annual, 1895
- "Contraband of War", The Idler, February 1896
- "In Borrowed Plumes", The Minster Magazine, February 1896
- "A Benefit Performance", To-Day, August 1896
- "A Love Passage", The Idler, February 1896
- "The Brown Man's Servant", Pearson's Magazine, December 1896
- "Wapping-on-Thames", Windsor Magazine, June 1897
- "Rule of Three", The Graphic, 1 July 1897
- "The Skipper's Wooing", Windsor Magazine, July 1897
- Jerry Bundler, Windsor Magazine, December 1897
- "The Lady of the Barge", Harper's Magazine, August 1900
- "The Monkey's Paw", Harper's Magazine, September 1902

== Film adaptations ==
- The Monkey's Paw adaptations in 1915, 1923, 1933, 1948, 2008 and 2013
- 1922 A Master of Craft
- 1936 Our Relations, a Laurel and Hardy feature film with a "suggested by" credit to Jacobs's "The Money Box"
- 1937 Beauty and the Barge
- 1955 Footsteps in the Fog, from the short story "The Interruption"

== See also ==
- List of adaptations of The Monkey's Paw
- Olwen Wymark (granddaughter)
- Jane Wymark (great-granddaughter)
