= The Monkey's Paw (1923 film) =

1923 film

- Directed by: Manning Haynes
- Written by: Lydia Hayward; Louis N. Parker (play)
- Based on: "The Monkey's Paw" by W. W. Jacobs
- Produced by: George Redman
- Starring: Moore Marriott; Marie Ault; Charles Ashton
- Production company: Artistic Pictures
- Distributed by: Artistic Pictures; Selznick Pictures
- Release date: February 1923
- Running time: 64 minutes
- Country: United Kingdom
- Language: Silent (English intertitles)

The Monkey's Paw is a 1923 British silent horror film directed by Manning Haynes and starring Moore Marriott, Marie Ault, and Charles Ashton. It is an adaptation of W. W. Jacobs's 1902 short story "The Monkey's Paw". The short story was made into a 1907 one-act play by Louis N. Parker, elements of which were also incorporated into this 1923 British film by screenwriter Lydia Hayward.

== Plot ==
As described in a film magazine review for an American audience, a traveller tells a family, John White, his wife, and son, weird tales of a magical talisman, a monkey's paw, which has the power of granting its possessor three wishes, but only with hellish consequences as punishment for tampering with fate. The father falls asleep. In his dreams he acquires the paw and requests two thousand dollars. He gets the money but this results in the death of his son Herbert. His wife compels him to wish that her boy was alive again. This is accomplished, but when he appears as a soulless zombie, in his fright Mr. White makes his third and final wish that his son be dead once more, where he may hopefully rest in peace. Awakening, the father wants nothing to do with the magic charm.

== Cast ==
- Moore Marriott as John White
- Marie Ault as Mrs. White
- Charles Ashton as Herbert White
- Johnny Butt as Sergeant Tom Morris
- A. B. Imeson
- George Wynn
- Tom Coventry as Engine Driver

== Production ==
The film was shot in England, partially at Bushey Studios. The original film print was five reels long.

The May 5, 1923 issue of Motion Picture News reported that the Selznik Distributing Corporation had purchased the United States and Australian rights to the film.

== Reception ==
Frank Elliot of Motion Picture News called the film "An unusual little tale" and "fairly satisfying." He praised the unusual plot development, directing, and acting.

The Princess Theatre in Waterbury, Connecticut wrote a less positive report to the Exhibitors Herald about the audience reactions, saying: "Some said 'Terrible'... The 'Yessers' tried to be nice, but wouldn't commit themselves."

== Bibliography ==
- Goble, Alan. The Complete Index to Literary Sources in Film. Walter de Gruyter, 1999.
