= Agatha Christie bibliography =

- Novels↙: 74
- Collections↙: 28
- Poems↙: 3
- Plays↙: 16
- Broadcast works↙: 7
- As editor↙: 1
- Autobiography↙: 2

Agatha Christie (1890–1976) was an English crime novelist, short-story writer and playwright. Her reputation rests on 66 detective novels and 15 short-story collections that have sold over two billion copies, an amount surpassed only by the Bible and the works of William Shakespeare. She is also the most translated individual author in the world with her books having been translated into more than 100 languages. Her works contain several regular characters with whom the public became familiar, including Hercule Poirot, Miss Marple, Tommy and Tuppence Beresford, Parker Pyne and Harley Quin. Christie wrote more Poirot stories than any of the others, even though she thought the character to be "rather insufferable". Following the publication of the 1975 novel Curtain, Poirot's obituary appeared on the front page of The New York Times.

She married Archibald Christie in December 1914, but the couple divorced in 1928. After he was sent to the Western Front in the First World War, she worked with the Voluntary Aid Detachment and in the chemist dispensary, giving her a working background knowledge of medicines and poisons. Christie's writing career began during the war, after she was challenged by her sister to write a detective story; she produced The Mysterious Affair at Styles, which was turned down by two publishers before being published in 1920. Following the limited success of the novel, she continued to write and steadily built up a fan base. She went on to write over a hundred works, including further novels, short stories, plays, poetry, and two autobiographies. She also wrote six romantic novels under the pseudonym Mary Westmacott.

One of Christie's plays, The Mousetrap, opened in West End theatre in 1952, and ran continuously until 16 March 2020, when the stage performances had to be temporarily discontinued during the COVID-19 pandemic. It then re-opened on 17 May 2021. In 2025, the London run exceeded 30,000 performances.

In September 2015, a public vote identified And Then There Were None as the public's favourite Christie novel; the book was the writer's favourite, and the one she found most difficult to write.

In September 1930, Christie married the archaeologist Max Mallowan. The pair travelled frequently on archaeological expeditions, and she used the experiences she had while on her many adventures as a basis for some plots, including Murder on the Orient Express (1934), Murder in Mesopotamia (1936), Death on the Nile (1937) and Appointment with Death (1938). She also wrote the autobiographical travel book Come, Tell Me How You Live (1946), which described their life in Syria. Her biographer, Janet Morgan, reports that "archaeologists have celebrated ... [Christie's] contribution to Near Eastern exploration". Christie died in 1976, her reputation as a crime novelist high.

== Novels ==
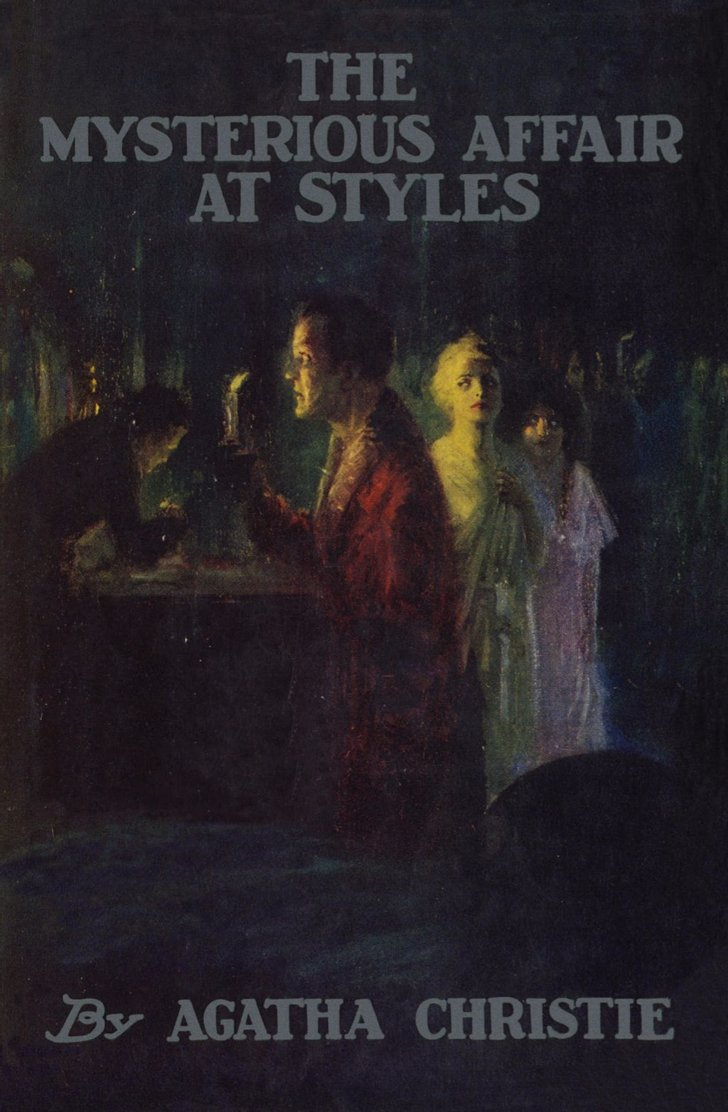
First edition cover of The Mysterious Affair at Styles, published in 1920

Initially in chronological order by UK publication date, even when the book was published first in the US or serialised in a magazine in advance of publication in book form.

Christie's novels
UK title	Year of UK publication	UK publisher (All London)	Year of US publication	US title	US publisher (All New York)	Series	Notes
The Mysterious Affair at Styles	1921	The Bodley Head	1920	The Mysterious Affair at Styles	John Lane	Hercule Poirot	–
The Secret Adversary	1922	The Bodley Head	1922	The Secret Adversary	Dodd, Mead & Co	Tommy and Tuppence	–
The Murder on the Links	1923	The Bodley Head	1923	The Murder on the Links	Dodd, Mead & Co	Hercule Poirot	–
The Man in the Brown Suit	1924	The Bodley Head	1924	The Man in the Brown Suit	Dodd, Mead & Co	Colonel Race	–
The Secret of Chimneys	1925	The Bodley Head	1925	The Secret of Chimneys	Dodd, Mead & Co	Superintendent Battle	–
The Murder of Roger Ackroyd	1926	William Collins & Sons	1926	The Murder of Roger Ackroyd	Dodd, Mead & Co	Hercule Poirot	–
The Big Four	1927	William Collins & Sons	1927	The Big Four	Dodd, Mead & Co	Hercule Poirot	–
The Mystery of the Blue Train	1928	William Collins & Sons	1928	The Mystery of the Blue Train	Dodd, Mead & Co	Hercule Poirot	–
The Seven Dials Mystery	1929	William Collins & Sons	1929	The Seven Dials Mystery	Dodd, Mead & Co	Superintendent Battle	–
The Murder at the Vicarage	1930	William Collins & Sons	1930	The Murder at the Vicarage	Dodd, Mead & Co	Miss Marple	–
Giant's Bread	1930	William Collins & Sons	1930	Giant's Bread	Doubleday	Other	As Mary Westmacott
The Floating Admiral	1931	Hodder & Stoughton	1932	The Floating Admiral	Doubleday	Mystery novel	With members of The Detection Club. (Note: A chapter each was completed by: Canon Victor Whitechurch, George and Margaret Cole, Henry Wade, Agatha Christie, John Rhode, Milward Kennedy, Sayers, Ronald Knox, Freeman Wills Crofts, Edgar Jepson, Clemence Dane and Anthony Berkeley. G. K. Chesterton contributed the prologue.)
The Sittaford Mystery	1931	William Collins & Sons	1931	The Murder at Hazelmoor	Dodd, Mead & Co	Mystery novel	–
Peril at End House	1932	William Collins & Sons	1932	Peril at End House	Dodd, Mead & Co	Hercule Poirot	–
Lord Edgware Dies	1933	William Collins & Sons	1933	Thirteen at Dinner	Dodd, Mead & Co	Hercule Poirot	–
Murder on the Orient Express	1934	William Collins & Sons	1934	Murder in the Calais Coach	Dodd, Mead & Co	Hercule Poirot	–
Unfinished Portrait	1934	William Collins & Sons	1934	Unfinished Portrait	Doubleday	Other	As Mary Westmacott
Why Didn't They Ask Evans?	1934	William Collins & Sons	1935	The Boomerang Clue	Dodd, Mead & Co	Mystery novel	–
Three Act Tragedy	1935	William Collins & Sons	1934	Murder in Three Acts	Dodd, Mead & Co	Hercule Poirot	–
Death in the Clouds	1935	William Collins & Sons	1935	Death in the Air	Dodd, Mead & Co	Hercule Poirot	–
The A.B.C. Murders	1936	William Collins & Sons	1936	The A.B.C. Murders	Dodd, Mead & Co	Hercule Poirot	–
Murder in Mesopotamia	1936	William Collins & Sons	1936	Murder in Mesopotamia	Dodd, Mead & Co	Hercule Poirot	–
Cards on the Table	1936	William Collins & Sons	1937	Cards on the Table	Dodd, Mead & Co	Hercule Poirot	–
Dumb Witness	1937	William Collins & Sons	1937	Poirot Loses a Client	Dodd, Mead & Co	Hercule Poirot	–
Death on the Nile	1937	William Collins & Sons	1938	Death on the Nile	Dodd, Mead & Co	Hercule Poirot	–
Appointment with Death	1938	William Collins & Sons	1938	Appointment with Death	Dodd, Mead & Co	Hercule Poirot	–
Hercule Poirot's Christmas	1938	William Collins & Sons	1939	Murder for Christmas	Dodd, Mead & Co	Hercule Poirot	Later US editions also published under the title A Holiday for Murder
Murder Is Easy	1939	William Collins & Sons	1939	Easy to Kill	Dodd, Mead & Co	Superintendent Battle	–
And Then There Were None	1939	William Collins & Sons	1941	And Then There Were None	Dodd, Mead & Co	Mystery novel	Also published in the U.S. as Ten Little Indians
Sad Cypress	1940	William Collins & Sons	1940	Sad Cypress	Dodd, Mead & Co	Hercule Poirot	–
One, Two, Buckle My Shoe	1940	William Collins & Sons	1941	The Patriotic Murders	Dodd, Mead & Co	Hercule Poirot	Published in paperback in the US under the title An Overdose of Death
Evil Under the Sun	1941	William Collins & Sons	1941	Evil Under the Sun	Dodd, Mead & Co	Hercule Poirot	–
N or M?	1941	William Collins & Sons	1941	N or M?	Dodd, Mead & Co	Tommy and Tuppence	–
The Body in the Library	1942	William Collins & Sons	1942	The Body in the Library	Dodd, Mead & Co	Miss Marple	–
Five Little Pigs	1942	William Collins & Sons	1942	Murder in Retrospect	Dodd, Mead & Co	Hercule Poirot	–
The Moving Finger	1943	William Collins & Sons	1942	The Moving Finger	Dodd, Mead & Co	Miss Marple	–
Towards Zero	1944	William Collins & Sons	1944	Towards Zero	Dodd, Mead & Co	Superintendent Battle	–
Absent in the Spring	1944	William Collins & Sons	1944	Absent in the Spring	Farrar & Rinehart	Other	As Mary Westmacott
Death Comes as the End	1945	William Collins & Sons	1944	Death Comes as the End	Dodd, Mead & Co	Mystery novel	–
Sparkling Cyanide	1945	William Collins & Sons	1945	Remembered Death	Dodd, Mead & Co	Colonel Race	–
The Hollow	1946	William Collins & Sons	1946	The Hollow	Dodd, Mead & Co	Hercule Poirot	–
Taken at the Flood	1948	William Collins & Sons	1948	There is a Tide . . .	Dodd, Mead & Co	Hercule Poirot	–
The Rose and the Yew Tree	1948	Heinemann	1948	The Rose and the Yew Tree	Rinehart & Company	Other	As Mary Westmacott
Crooked House	1949	William Collins & Sons	1949	Crooked House	Dodd, Mead & Co	Mystery novel	–
A Murder Is Announced	1950	William Collins & Sons	1950	A Murder Is Announced	Dodd, Mead & Co	Miss Marple	–
They Came to Baghdad	1951	William Collins & Sons	1951	They Came to Baghdad	Dodd, Mead & Co	Mystery novel	–
Mrs McGinty's Dead	1952	William Collins & Sons	1952	Mrs McGinty's Dead	Dodd, Mead & Co	Hercule Poirot	–
They Do It with Mirrors	1952	William Collins & Sons	1952	Murder with Mirrors	Dodd, Mead & Co	Miss Marple	–
A Daughter's a Daughter	1952	William Collins & Sons	1963	A Daughter's a Daughter	Dell Publishing	Other	As Mary Westmacott
After the Funeral	1953	William Collins & Sons	1953	Funerals are Fatal	Dodd, Mead & Co	Hercule Poirot	–
A Pocket Full of Rye	1953	William Collins & Sons	1954	A Pocket Full of Rye	Dodd, Mead & Co	Miss Marple	–
Destination Unknown	1954	William Collins & Sons	1955	So Many Steps to Death	Dodd, Mead & Co. Syndicated in US Newspapers as Destination X.	Mystery novel	–
Hickory Dickory Dock	1955	William Collins & Sons	1955	Hickory Dickory Death	Dodd, Mead & Co	Hercule Poirot	–
Dead Man's Folly	1956	William Collins & Sons	1956	Dead Man's Folly	Dodd, Mead & Co	Hercule Poirot	–
The Burden	1956	Heinemann	1963	The Burden	Dell Publishing	Other	As Mary Westmacott
4:50 from Paddington	1957	William Collins & Sons	1957	What Mrs. McGillicuddy Saw!	Dodd, Mead & Co	Miss Marple	–
Ordeal by Innocence	1958	William Collins & Sons	1959	Ordeal by Innocence	Dodd, Mead & Co	Mystery novel	–
Cat Among the Pigeons	1959	William Collins & Sons	1960	Cat Among the Pigeons	Dodd, Mead & Co	Hercule Poirot	–
The Pale Horse	1961	William Collins & Sons	1962	The Pale Horse	Dodd, Mead & Co	Mystery novel	–
The Mirror Crack'd from Side to Side	1962	William Collins & Sons	1963	The Mirror Crack'd	Dodd, Mead & Co	Miss Marple	–
The Clocks	1963	William Collins & Sons	1964	The Clocks	Dodd, Mead & Co	Hercule Poirot	–
A Caribbean Mystery	1964	William Collins & Sons	1965	A Caribbean Mystery	Dodd, Mead & Co	Miss Marple	–
At Bertram's Hotel	1965	William Collins & Sons	1965	At Bertram's Hotel	Dodd, Mead & Co	Miss Marple	–
Third Girl	1966	William Collins & Sons	1967	Third Girl	Dodd, Mead & Co	Hercule Poirot	–
Endless Night	1967	William Collins & Sons	1968	Endless Night	Dodd, Mead & Co	Mystery novel	–
By the Pricking of My Thumbs	1968	William Collins & Sons	1968	By the Pricking of My Thumbs	Dodd, Mead & Co	Tommy and Tuppence	–
Hallowe'en Party	1969	William Collins & Sons	1969	Hallowe'en Party	Dodd, Mead & Co	Hercule Poirot	Also published as A Haunting in Venice, as a tie-in with the movie of the same name
Passenger to Frankfurt	1970	William Collins & Sons	1970	Passenger to Frankfurt	Dodd, Mead & Co	Mystery novel	–
Nemesis	1971	William Collins & Sons	1971	Nemesis	Dodd, Mead & Co	Miss Marple	–
Elephants Can Remember	1972	William Collins & Sons	1972	Elephants Can Remember	Dodd, Mead & Co	Hercule Poirot	–
Postern of Fate	1973	William Collins & Sons	1973	Postern of Fate	Dodd, Mead & Co	Tommy and Tuppence	–
Curtain	1975	William Collins & Sons	1975	Curtain	Dodd, Mead & Co	Hercule Poirot	Poirot's last case, written in the 1940s.
Sleeping Murder	1976	William Collins & Sons	1976	Sleeping Murder	Dodd, Mead & Co	Miss Marple	Miss Marple's last case, written in the 1940s.
Hercule Poirot and the Greenshore Folly	2014	HarperCollins				Hercule Poirot	Written in 1954 to raise money for a church. Later reworked into Dead Man's Folly (see above).

== Short fiction collections ==
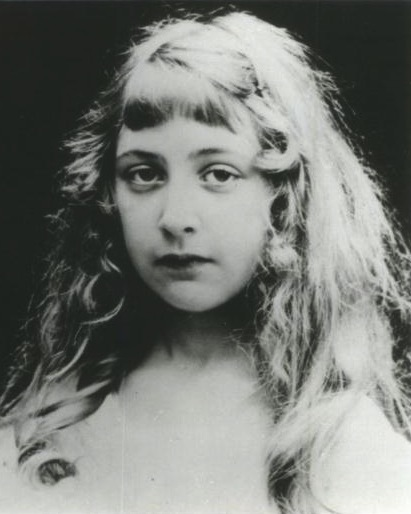
Agatha Christie as a girl, date unknown

Many of Christie's stories first appeared in journals, newspapers and magazines. This list consists of the published collections of stories, in chronological order by UK publication date, even when the book was published first in the US or serialised in a magazine in advance of publication in book form.

Christie's short-story collections
UK title	Year of UK publication	UK publisher (All London)	US title	Year of US publication	US publisher (All New York)	Series
Poirot Investigates	1924	John Lane	Poirot Investigates	1925	Dodd, Mead & Co	Hercule Poirot
Partners in Crime	1929	William Collins & Sons	Partners in Crime	1929	Dodd, Mead & Co	Tommy and Tuppence
The Mysterious Mr Quin	1930	William Collins & Sons	The Mysterious Mr Quin	1930	Dodd, Mead & Co	Harley Quin
The Thirteen Problems (Note: An abridged edition was published as The Mystery of the Blue Geraniums, and Other Tuesday Club Murders by Bantam Books in 1940.)	1932	William Collins & Sons	The Tuesday Club Murders	1933	Dodd, Mead & Co	Miss Marple
The Hound of Death	1933	Odhams Press	–	–	–	–
The Listerdale Mystery	1934	William Collins & Sons	–	–	–	–
Parker Pyne Investigates	1934	William Collins & Sons	Mr. Parker Pyne, Detective	1934	Dodd, Mead & Co	Parker Pyne
Murder in the Mews	1937	William Collins & Sons	Dead Man's Mirror	1937	Dodd, Mead & Co	Hercule Poirot
–	–	–	The Regatta Mystery and Other Stories	1939	Dodd, Mead & Co	Hercule Poirot, Parker Pyne & Miss Marple
The Crime in Cabin 66	1943	Vallencey	The Mystery of the Crime in Cabin 66	1943	Bantam Books	Also called Problem at Sea
The Mystery of the Baghdad Chest	1943	Bantam Books	The Mystery of the Baghdad Chest	1943	Bantam Books	Hercule Poirot
Poirot and the Regatta Mystery	1943	Bantam Books	Poirot and the Regatta Mystery	1943	Bantam Books	Hercule Poirot
Poirot on Holiday	1943	Todd	–	–	–	Hercule Poirot
Problem at Pollensa Bay and The Christmas Adventure	1943	Todd	–	–	–	Hercule Poirot
The Veiled Lady and The Mystery of the Baghdad Chest	1944	Todd	–	–	–	Hercule Poirot
Poirot Knows the Murderer	1946	Todd	–	–	–	Hercule Poirot
The Labours of Hercules	1947	William Collins & Sons	The Labors of Hercules: New Adventures in Crime by Hercule Poirot	1947	Dodd, Mead & Co	Hercule Poirot
–	–	–	The Witness for the Prosecution and Other Stories	1948	Dodd, Mead & Co	Hercule Poirot and others
–	–	–	The Under Dog and Other Stories	1951	Dodd, Mead & Co	Hercule Poirot
–	–	–	Three Blind Mice and Other Stories (Note: Republished in 1960 as The Mousetrap and Other Stories.)	1950	Dodd, Mead & Co	–
The Adventure of the Christmas Pudding	1960	William Collins & Sons	–	–	–	Hercule Poirot, Miss Marple and others
–	–	–	Double Sin and Other Stories	1961	Dodd, Mead & Co	–
13 for Luck! A Selection of Mystery Stories for Young Readers	1966	William Collins & Sons	13 for Luck! A Selection of Mystery Stories for Young Readers	1961	Dodd, Mead & Co	–
–	–	–	Surprise! Surprise!	1965	Dodd, Mead & Co	–
–	–	–	13 Clues for Miss Marple	1966	Dodd, Mead & Co	Miss Marple
–	–	–	The Golden Ball and Other Stories	1971	Dodd, Mead & Co	–
Poirot's Early Cases	1974	William Collins & Sons	Hercule Poirot's Early Cases	1974	Dodd, Mead & Co	Hercule Poirot
Miss Marple's Final Cases and Two Other Stories	1979	William Collins & Sons	–	–	–	Miss Marple and others
Problem at Pollensa Bay and Other Stories	1991	HarperCollins	–	–	–	Hercule Poirot, Parker Pyne & Harley Quin and others
While the Light Lasts and Other Stories	1997	HarperCollins	–	–	–	–
Miss Marple Complete Short Stories	1997	HarperCollins	-	1997	-	–
The Big Four (short-story version)	2017	HarperCollins	–	–	–	Hercule Poirot

=== List of short stories ===
A total of 166 stories have been written and published in 15 collections in the US and the UK. 165 stories were published in the UK, with the omission of "Three Blind Mice." The 12 original short stories that were used for The Big Four were published in the UK in 2017. 154 other stories were published in the US. Some stories were published under different names in the US collections.

Four short stories, including "The Submarine Plans," "Christmas Adventure," "The Mystery of the Baghdad Chest," and "The Second Gong," were expanded into longer stories by Christie (respectively "The Incredible Theft," "The Adventure of the Christmas Pudding," "The Mystery of the Spanish Chest," and "Dead Man's Mirror").

==== UK collections ====
This is a list of 166 stories sorted by the 15 UK collections in chronological order.

UK collections
UK collection	UK title	US collection
Poirot Investigates (11)	"The Adventure of 'The Western Star'"	Poirot Investigates (14)—also includes "The Veiled Lady", "The Lost Mine", and "The Chocolate Box"
Poirot Investigates (11)	"The Tragedy at Marsdon Manor"	Poirot Investigates (14)—also includes "The Veiled Lady", "The Lost Mine", and "The Chocolate Box"
Poirot Investigates (11)	"The Adventure of the Cheap Flat"	Poirot Investigates (14)—also includes "The Veiled Lady", "The Lost Mine", and "The Chocolate Box"
Poirot Investigates (11)	"The Mystery of Hunter's Lodge"	Poirot Investigates (14)—also includes "The Veiled Lady", "The Lost Mine", and "The Chocolate Box"
Poirot Investigates (11)	"The Million Dollar Bond Robbery"	Poirot Investigates (14)—also includes "The Veiled Lady", "The Lost Mine", and "The Chocolate Box"
Poirot Investigates (11)	"The Adventure of the Egyptian Tomb"	Poirot Investigates (14)—also includes "The Veiled Lady", "The Lost Mine", and "The Chocolate Box"
Poirot Investigates (11)	"The Jewel Robbery at the Grand Metropolitan"	Poirot Investigates (14)—also includes "The Veiled Lady", "The Lost Mine", and "The Chocolate Box"
Poirot Investigates (11)	"The Kidnapped Prime Minister"	Poirot Investigates (14)—also includes "The Veiled Lady", "The Lost Mine", and "The Chocolate Box"
Poirot Investigates (11)	"The Disappearance of Mr. Davenheim"	Poirot Investigates (14)—also includes "The Veiled Lady", "The Lost Mine", and "The Chocolate Box"
Poirot Investigates (11)	"The Adventure of the Italian Nobleman"	Poirot Investigates (14)—also includes "The Veiled Lady", "The Lost Mine", and "The Chocolate Box"
Poirot Investigates (11)	"The Case of the Missing Will"	Poirot Investigates (14)—also includes "The Veiled Lady", "The Lost Mine", and "The Chocolate Box"
Partners in Crime (15)	"A Fairy in the Flat"	Partners in Crime
Partners in Crime (15)	"A Pot of Tea"	Partners in Crime
Partners in Crime (15)	"The Affair of the Pink Pearl"	Partners in Crime
Partners in Crime (15)	"The Adventure of the Sinister Stranger"	Partners in Crime
Partners in Crime (15)	"Finessing the King/The Gentleman Dressed in Newspaper"	Partners in Crime
Partners in Crime (15)	"The Case of the Missing Lady"	Partners in Crime
Partners in Crime (15)	"Blindman's Buff"	Partners in Crime
Partners in Crime (15)	"The Man in the Mist"	Partners in Crime
Partners in Crime (15)	"The Crackler"	Partners in Crime
Partners in Crime (15)	"The Sunningdale Mystery"	Partners in Crime
Partners in Crime (15)	"The House of Lurking Death"	Partners in Crime
Partners in Crime (15)	"The Unbreakable Alibi"	Partners in Crime
Partners in Crime (15)	"The Clergyman's Daughter/The Red House"	Partners in Crime
Partners in Crime (15)	"The Ambassador's Boots"	Partners in Crime
Partners in Crime (15)	"The Man Who Was No. 16"	Partners in Crime
The Mysterious Mr Quin (12)	"The Coming of Mr. Quin"	The Mysterious Mr Quin
The Mysterious Mr Quin (12)	"The Shadow on the Glass"	The Mysterious Mr Quin
The Mysterious Mr Quin (12)	"At the 'Bells and Motley'"	The Mysterious Mr Quin
The Mysterious Mr Quin (12)	"The Sign in the Sky"	The Mysterious Mr Quin
The Mysterious Mr Quin (12)	"The Soul of the Croupier"	The Mysterious Mr Quin
The Mysterious Mr Quin (12)	"The Man from the Sea"	The Mysterious Mr Quin
The Mysterious Mr Quin (12)	"The Voice in the Dark"	The Mysterious Mr Quin
The Mysterious Mr Quin (12)	"The Face of Helen"	The Mysterious Mr Quin
The Mysterious Mr Quin (12)	"The Dead Harlequin"	The Mysterious Mr Quin
The Mysterious Mr Quin (12)	"The Bird with the Broken Wing"	The Mysterious Mr Quin
The Mysterious Mr Quin (12)	"The World's End"	The Mysterious Mr Quin
The Mysterious Mr Quin (12)	"Harlequin's Lane"	The Mysterious Mr Quin
The Thirteen Problems (13)	"The Tuesday Night Club"	The Tuesday Club Murders
The Thirteen Problems (13)	"The Idol House of Astarte"	The Tuesday Club Murders
The Thirteen Problems (13)	"Ingots of Gold"	The Tuesday Club Murders
The Thirteen Problems (13)	"The Blood-Stained Pavement"	The Tuesday Club Murders
The Thirteen Problems (13)	"Motive v. Opportunity"	The Tuesday Club Murders
The Thirteen Problems (13)	"The Thumb Mark of St. Peter"	The Tuesday Club Murders
The Thirteen Problems (13)	"The Blue Geranium"	The Tuesday Club Murders
The Thirteen Problems (13)	"The Companion"	The Tuesday Club Murders
The Thirteen Problems (13)	"The Four Suspects"	The Tuesday Club Murders
The Thirteen Problems (13)	"A Christmas Tragedy"	The Tuesday Club Murders
The Thirteen Problems (13)	"The Herb of Death"	The Tuesday Club Murders
The Thirteen Problems (13)	"The Affair at the Bungalow"	The Tuesday Club Murders
The Thirteen Problems (13)	"Death by Drowning"	The Tuesday Club Murders
The Hound of Death (12)	"The Hound of Death"	The Golden Ball and Other Stories
The Hound of Death (12)	"The Red Signal"	The Witness for the Prosecution and Other Stories
The Hound of Death (12)	"The Fourth Man"	The Witness for the Prosecution and Other Stories
The Hound of Death (12)	"The Gypsy"	The Golden Ball and Other Stories
The Hound of Death (12)	"The Lamp"	The Golden Ball and Other Stories
The Hound of Death (12)	"Wireless"	The Witness for the Prosecution and Other Stories under the name "Where There's a Will"
The Hound of Death (12)	"The Witness for the Prosecution"	The Witness for the Prosecution and Other Stories
The Hound of Death (12)	"The Mystery of the Blue Jar"	The Witness for the Prosecution and Other Stories
The Hound of Death (12)	"The Strange Case of Sir Arthur Carmichael"	The Golden Ball and Other Stories under the name "The Strange Case of Sir Andrew Carmichael"
The Hound of Death (12)	"The Call of Wings"	The Golden Ball and Other Stories
The Hound of Death (12)	"The Last Seance"	Double Sin and Other Stories
The Hound of Death (12)	"S.O.S."	The Witness for the Prosecution and Other Stories
The Listerdale Mystery (12)	"The Listerdale Mystery"	The Golden Ball and Other Stories
The Listerdale Mystery (12)	"Philomel Cottage"	The Witness for the Prosecution and Other Stories
The Listerdale Mystery (12)	"The Girl in the Train"	The Golden Ball and Other Stories
The Listerdale Mystery (12)	"Sing a Song of Sixpence"	The Witness for the Prosecution and Other Stories
The Listerdale Mystery (12)	"The Manhood of Edward Robinson"	The Golden Ball and Other Stories
The Listerdale Mystery (12)	"Accident"	The Witness for the Prosecution and Other Stories
The Listerdale Mystery (12)	"Jane in Search of a Job"	The Golden Ball and Other Stories
The Listerdale Mystery (12)	"A Fruitful Sunday"	The Golden Ball and Other Stories
The Listerdale Mystery (12)	"Mr. Eastwood's Adventure"	The Witness for the Prosecution and Other Stories
The Listerdale Mystery (12)	"The Golden Ball"	The Golden Ball and Other Stories
The Listerdale Mystery (12)	"The Rajah's Emerald"	The Golden Ball and Other Stories
The Listerdale Mystery (12)	"Swan Song"	The Golden Ball and Other Stories
Parker Pyne Investigates (12)	"The Case of the Middle-aged Wife"	Mr. Parker Pyne, Detective
Parker Pyne Investigates (12)	"The Case of the Discontented Soldier"	Mr. Parker Pyne, Detective
Parker Pyne Investigates (12)	"The Case of the Distressed Lady"	Mr. Parker Pyne, Detective
Parker Pyne Investigates (12)	"The Case of the Discontented Husband"	Mr. Parker Pyne, Detective
Parker Pyne Investigates (12)	"The Case of the City Clerk"	Mr. Parker Pyne, Detective
Parker Pyne Investigates (12)	"The Case of the Rich Woman"	Mr. Parker Pyne, Detective
Parker Pyne Investigates (12)	"Have You Got Everything You Want?"	Mr. Parker Pyne, Detective
Parker Pyne Investigates (12)	"The Gate of Baghdad"	Mr. Parker Pyne, Detective
Parker Pyne Investigates (12)	"The House at Shiraz"	Mr. Parker Pyne, Detective
Parker Pyne Investigates (12)	"The Pearl of Price"	Mr. Parker Pyne, Detective
Parker Pyne Investigates (12)	"Death on the Nile"	Mr. Parker Pyne, Detective
Parker Pyne Investigates (12)	"The Oracle at Delphi"	Mr. Parker Pyne, Detective
Murder in the Mews (4)	"Murder in the Mews"	Dead Man's Mirror
Murder in the Mews (4)	"The Incredible Theft"	Dead Man's Mirror
Murder in the Mews (4)	"Dead Man's Mirror"	Dead Man's Mirror
Murder in the Mews (4)	"Triangle at Rhodes"	Dead Man's Mirror
The Labours of Hercules (12)	"The Nemean Lion"	The Labors of Hercules
The Labours of Hercules (12)	"The Lernaean Hydra"	The Labors of Hercules
The Labours of Hercules (12)	"The Arcadian Deer"	The Labors of Hercules
The Labours of Hercules (12)	"The Erymanthian Boar"	The Labors of Hercules
The Labours of Hercules (12)	"The Augean Stables"	The Labors of Hercules
The Labours of Hercules (12)	"The Stymphalean Birds"	The Labors of Hercules
The Labours of Hercules (12)	"The Cretan Bull"	The Labors of Hercules
The Labours of Hercules (12)	"The Horse of Diomedes"	The Labors of Hercules
The Labours of Hercules (12)	"The Girdle of Hippolyta"	The Labors of Hercules
The Labours of Hercules (12)	"The Flock of Geryon"	The Labors of Hercules
The Labours of Hercules (12)	"The Apples of the Hesperides"	The Labors of Hercules
The Labours of Hercules (12)	"The Capture of Cerberus"	The Labors of Hercules
The Adventure of the Christmas Pudding (6)	"The Adventure of the Christmas Pudding"	Double Sin and Other Stories under the name "The Theft of the Royal Ruby"
The Adventure of the Christmas Pudding (6)	"The Mystery of the Spanish Chest"	The Harlequin Tea Set
The Adventure of the Christmas Pudding (6)	"The Under Dog"	The Under Dog and Other Stories
The Adventure of the Christmas Pudding (6)	"Four and Twenty Blackbirds"	Three Blind Mice and Other Stories
The Adventure of the Christmas Pudding (6)	"The Dream"	The Regatta Mystery
The Adventure of the Christmas Pudding (6)	"Greenshaw's Folly"	Double Sin and Other Stories
Poirot's Early Cases (18)	"The Affair at the Victory Ball"	The Under Dog and Other Stories
Poirot's Early Cases (18)	"The Adventure of the Clapham Cook"	The Under Dog and Other Stories
Poirot's Early Cases (18)	"The Cornish Mystery"	The Under Dog and Other Stories
Poirot's Early Cases (18)	"The Adventure of Johnnie Waverly"	Three Blind Mice and Other Stories
Poirot's Early Cases (18)	"The Double Clue"	Double Sin and Other Stories
Poirot's Early Cases (18)	"The King of Clubs"	The Under Dog and Other Stories
Poirot's Early Cases (18)	"The Lemesurier Inheritance"	The Under Dog and Other Stories
Poirot's Early Cases (18)	"The Lost Mine"	Poirot Investigates (US edition only)
Poirot's Early Cases (18)	"The Plymouth Express"	The Under Dog and Other Stories
Poirot's Early Cases (18)	"The Chocolate Box"	Poirot Investigates (US edition only)
Poirot's Early Cases (18)	"The Submarine Plans"	The Under Dog and Other Stories
Poirot's Early Cases (18)	"The Third-Floor Flat"	Three Blind Mice and Other Stories
Poirot's Early Cases (18)	"Double Sin"	Double Sin and Other Stories
Poirot's Early Cases (18)	"The Market Basing Mystery"	The Under Dog and Other Stories
Poirot's Early Cases (18)	"Wasps’ Nest"	Double Sin and Other Stories
Poirot's Early Cases (18)	"The Veiled Lady"	Poirot Investigates (US edition only)
Poirot's Early Cases (18)	"Problem at Sea"	The Regatta Mystery
Poirot's Early Cases (18)	"How Does Your Garden Grow?"	The Regatta Mystery
Miss Marple's Final Cases and Two Other Stories (8)	"Sanctuary"	Double Sin and Other Stories
Miss Marple's Final Cases and Two Other Stories (8)	"Strange Jest"	Three Blind Mice and Other Stories
Miss Marple's Final Cases and Two Other Stories (8)	"Tape-Measure Murder"	Three Blind Mice and Other Stories
Miss Marple's Final Cases and Two Other Stories (8)	"The Case of the Caretaker"	Three Blind Mice and Other Stories
Miss Marple's Final Cases and Two Other Stories (8)	"The Case of the Perfect Maid"	Three Blind Mice and Other Stories
Miss Marple's Final Cases and Two Other Stories (8)	"Miss Marple Tells a Story"	The Regatta Mystery
Miss Marple's Final Cases and Two Other Stories (8)	"The Dressmaker's Doll"	Double Sin and Other Stories
Miss Marple's Final Cases and Two Other Stories (8)	"In a Glass Darkly"	The Regatta Mystery
Problem at Pollensa Bay and Other Stories (8)	"Problem at Pollensa Bay"	The Regatta Mystery
Problem at Pollensa Bay and Other Stories (8)	"The Second Gong"	The Witness for the Prosecution and Other Stories
Problem at Pollensa Bay and Other Stories (8)	"Yellow Iris"	The Regatta Mystery
Problem at Pollensa Bay and Other Stories (8)	"The Harlequin Tea Set"	The Harlequin Tea Set
Problem at Pollensa Bay and Other Stories (8)	"The Regatta Mystery"	The Regatta Mystery
Problem at Pollensa Bay and Other Stories (8)	"The Love Detectives"	Three Blind Mice and Other Stories
Problem at Pollensa Bay and Other Stories (8)	"Next to a Dog"	The Golden Ball and Other Stories
Problem at Pollensa Bay and Other Stories (8)	"Magnolia Blossom"	The Golden Ball and Other Stories
While the Light Lasts and Other Stories (9)	"The House of Dreams"	The Harlequin Tea Set
While the Light Lasts and Other Stories (9)	"The Actress"	The Harlequin Tea Set
While the Light Lasts and Other Stories (9)	"The Edge"	The Harlequin Tea Set
While the Light Lasts and Other Stories (9)	"Christmas Adventure"	Midwinter Murder
While the Light Lasts and Other Stories (9)	"The Lonely God"	The Harlequin Tea Set
While the Light Lasts and Other Stories (9)	"Manx Gold"	The Harlequin Tea Set
While the Light Lasts and Other Stories (9)	"Within A Wall"	The Harlequin Tea Set
While the Light Lasts and Other Stories (9)	"The Mystery of the Baghdad Chest"	The Regatta Mystery
While the Light Lasts and Other Stories (9)	"While the Light Lasts"	The Harlequin Tea Set
The Big Four – The Detective Club (short story version) (12)	"The Unexpected Guest"	As yet unpublished in the US
The Big Four – The Detective Club (short story version) (12)	"The Adventure of the Dartmoor Bungalow"	As yet unpublished in the US
The Big Four – The Detective Club (short story version) (12)	"The Lady on the Stairs"	As yet unpublished in the US
The Big Four – The Detective Club (short story version) (12)	"The Radium Thieves"	As yet unpublished in the US
The Big Four – The Detective Club (short story version) (12)	"In the House of the Enemy"	As yet unpublished in the US
The Big Four – The Detective Club (short story version) (12)	"The Yellow Jasmine Mystery"	As yet unpublished in the US
The Big Four – The Detective Club (short story version) (12)	"The Chess Problem"	As yet unpublished in the US
The Big Four – The Detective Club (short story version) (12)	"The Baited Trap"	As yet unpublished in the US
The Big Four – The Detective Club (short story version) (12)	"The Adventure of the Peroxide Blonde"	As yet unpublished in the US
The Big Four – The Detective Club (short story version) (12)	"The Terrible Catastrophe"	As yet unpublished in the US
The Big Four – The Detective Club (short story version) (12)	"The Dying Chinaman"	As yet unpublished in the US
The Big Four – The Detective Club (short story version) (12)	"The Crag in the Dolomites"	As yet unpublished in the US
Never published in a UK collection	"Three Blind Mice"	Three Blind Mice and Other Stories
The Last Séance: Tales of the Supernatural	"The Wife of the Kenite"	The Last Séance: Tales of the Supernatural

==== US collections ====
There are 14 US collections, excluding Poirot's Early Cases, since all of its eighteen stories appeared in earlier collections, and The Last Séance: Tales of the Supernatural and Midwinter Murder, which each include only one previously unavailable Christie story.

US collections
Year	US collection	Number of stories
1925	Poirot Investigates	14
1929	Partners in Crime	15
1930	The Mysterious Mr Quin	12
1932	The Tuesday Club Murders	13
1934	Mr. Parker Pyne, Detective	12
1937	Dead Man's Mirror	4
1939	The Regatta Mystery	9
1947	The Labors of Hercules	12
1948	The Witness for the Prosecution and Other Stories	11
1950	Three Blind Mice and Other Stories	9
1951	The Under Dog and Other Stories	9
1961	Double Sin and Other Stories	8
1971	The Golden Ball and Other Stories	15
1997	The Harlequin Tea Set	9

=== Collaborative prose fiction ===
Collaborative prose fiction by Christie
Title	Year of first publication	First edition publisher (All London)	Category	Notes
Ask a Policeman	1933	Arthur Barker	Novel	Part 1 of The Detection Club trilogy
The Scoop and Behind the Screen	1983	Victor Gollancz	Mystery novellas	With members of The Detection Club
The Times of London Anthology of Detective Stories	1973	John Day	Mystery stories	Editor, with others

== Miscellany ==
Miscellaneous works by Christie
Title	Year of first publication	First edition publisher (All London)	Category	Notes
The Road of Dreams	1924	Geoffrey Bles	Poetry	
Come, Tell Me How You Live	1946	William Collins & Sons	Autobiographical travel book	Under the name Agatha Christie Mallowan
Star Over Bethlehem	1965	William Collins & Sons	Poetry and short stories	Under the name Agatha Christie Mallowan
Poems	1973	William Collins & Sons	Poetry	
Agatha Christie: An Autobiography	1977	William Collins & Sons	Autobiography	
The Grand Tour: Around the World with the Queen of Mystery	2012		Letters	

== Broadcast works ==
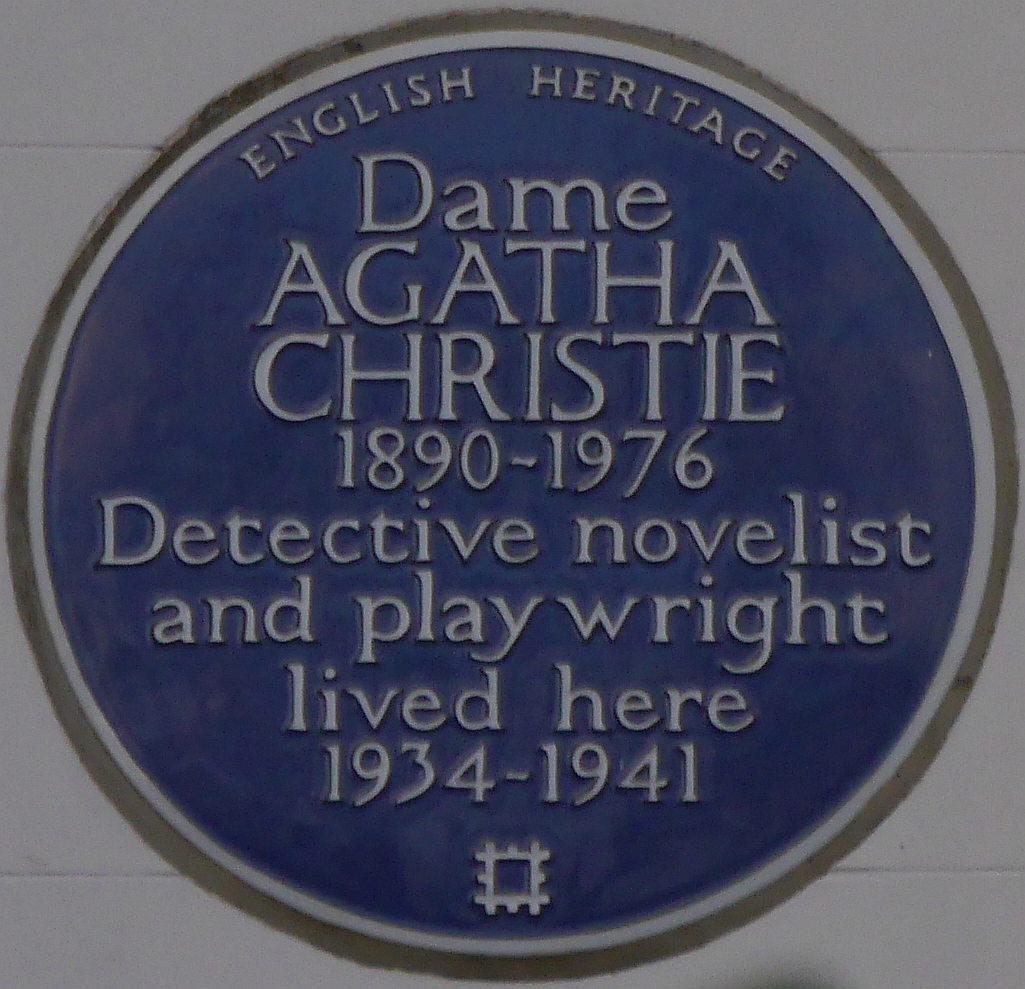
Blue plaque, at her former residence, 58 Sheffield Terrace, Kensington, London

Several of Christie's works have been adapted for stage and screen; the following is a list of only those works written by her on her own or as a member of a group.

Broadcast works of Christie
Title	First performance	Date of first performance	Type of work	Notes	Ref.
Behind The Screen	BBC Radio	14 June 1930	Radio play	Written together with Hugh Walpole, Dorothy L. Sayers, Anthony Berkeley, E. C. Bentley and Ronald Knox of The Detection Club.	
The Scoop	BBC Radio	10 January 1931	Radio play	Written together with Dorothy L. Sayers, E. C. Bentley, Anthony Berkeley, Freeman Wills Crofts and Clemence Dane of The Detection Club.	
Wasp's Nest	BBC Television	18 June 1937	Television play		
The Yellow Iris	BBC Radio	2 November 1937	Radio play		
Three Blind Mice	BBC Radio	30 May 1947	Radio play		
Butter in a Lordly Dish	BBC Radio	13 January 1948	Radio play		
Personal Call	BBC Radio	31 May 1954	Radio play		

== Stage works ==
The definitive study of Agatha Christie's stage plays is Curtain Up: Agatha Christie, a Life in Theatre by Julius Green.

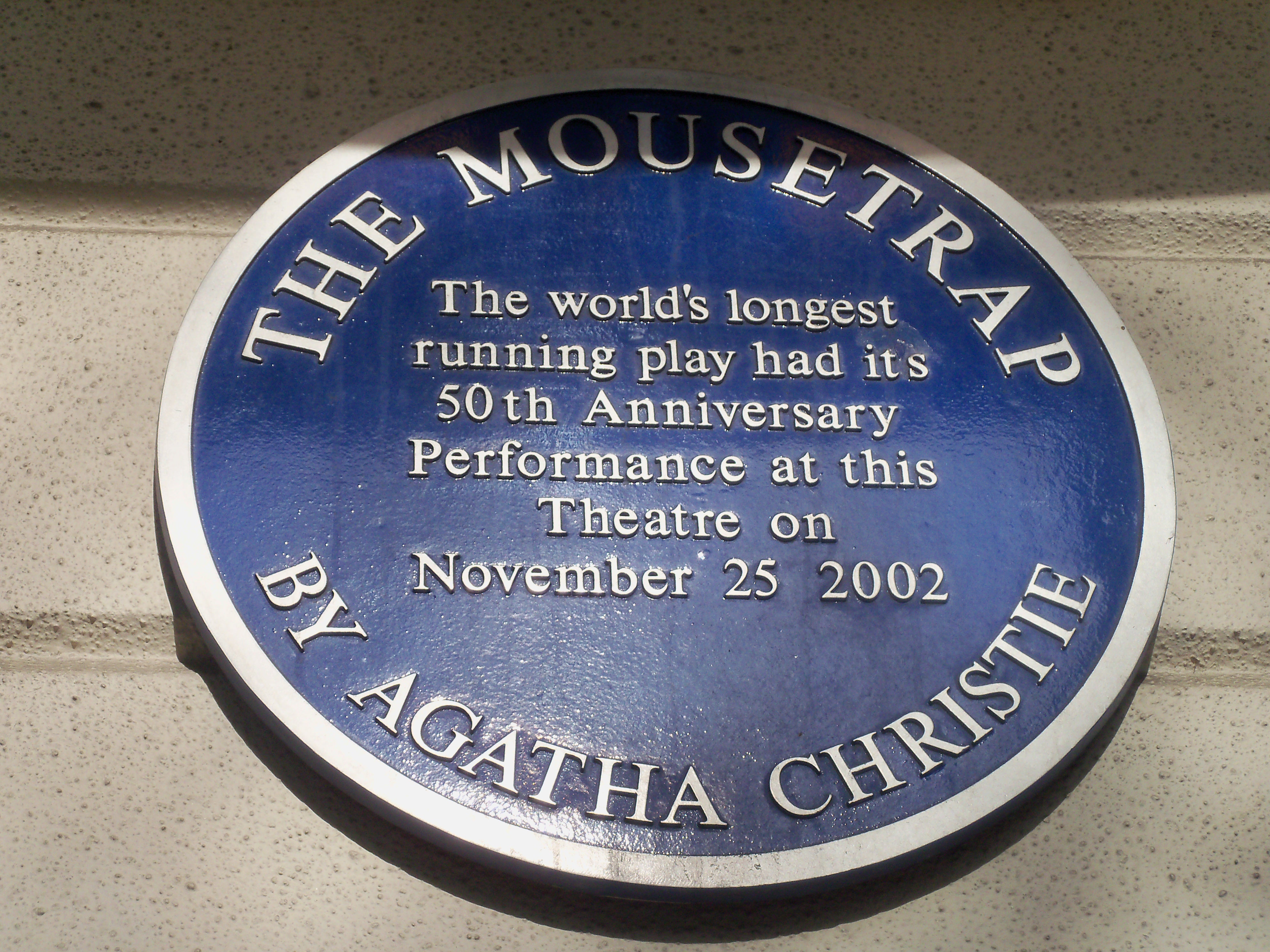
Blue plaque for The Mousetrap at St Martin's Theatre, London

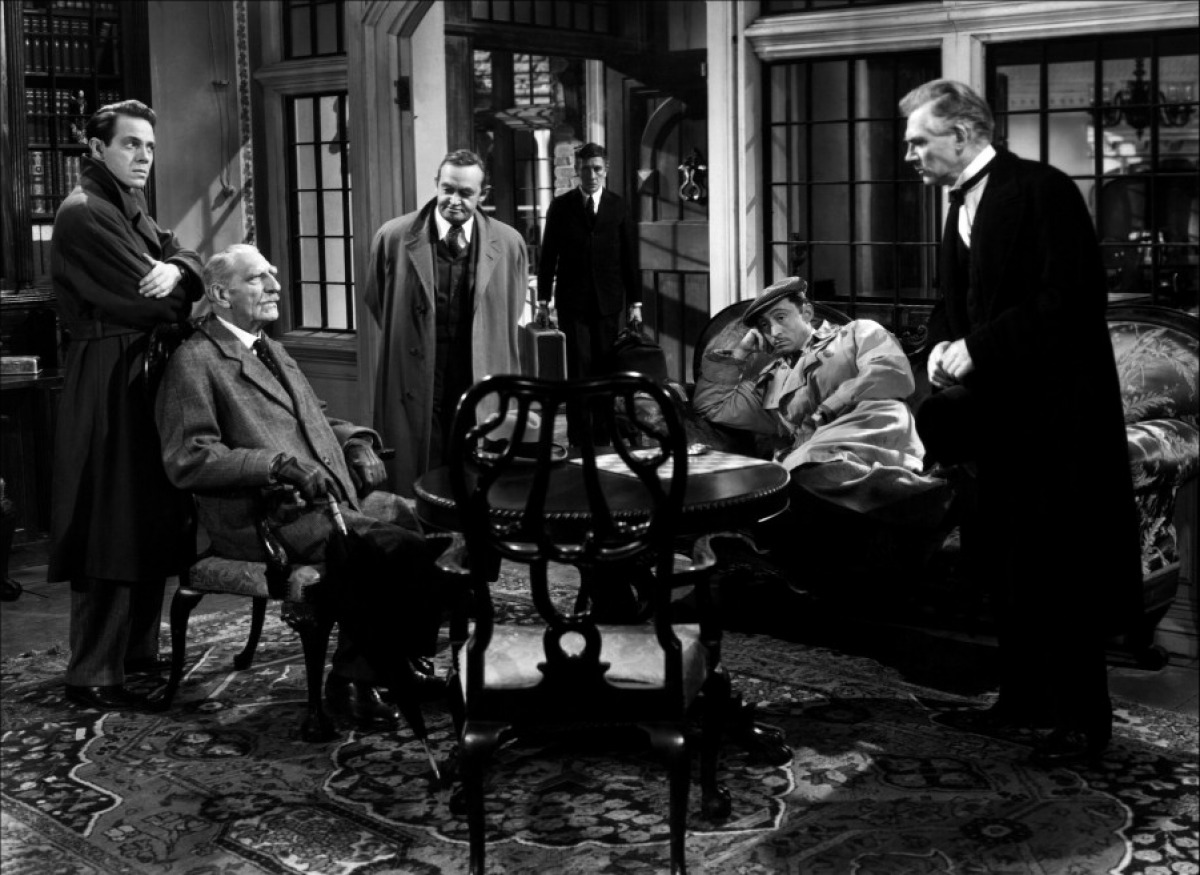
From left: Louis Hayward, C. Aubrey Smith, Barry Fitzgerald, Richard Haydn, Mischa Auer and Walter Huston in the 1945 film And Then There Were None, which was based on the 1943 play Ten Little Niggers.

Stage works of Christie
Title	Location of first performance (London, unless otherwise stated)	Date of first performance	Year of publication	Publisher (All London)	Notes
Black Coffee	Embassy Theatre	8 December 1930	1934	Ashley	Novelised by Charles Osborne in 1998 as Black Coffee
And Then There Were None	Wimbledon Theatre	20 September 1943	1944	Samuel French Ltd.	Based on the 1939 novel Ten Little Niggers; also known as Ten Little Indians and And Then There Were None.
Appointment with Death	King's Theatre, Glasgow	29 January 1945	1945	Samuel French Ltd.	Based on the 1938 novel Appointment with Death
Murder on the Nile	Dundee Repertory Theatre as Hidden Horizon	17 January 1944	1948	Samuel French Ltd.	Based on the 1937 novel Death on the Nile; a revised version—published as Murder on the Nile—was produced at Ambassadors Theatre on 19 March 1946
The Hollow	Cambridge Arts Theatre	10 February 1951	1952	Samuel French Ltd.	Based on the 1946 novel The Hollow.
The Mousetrap	Theatre Royal, Nottingham	6 October 1952	1954	Samuel French Ltd.	As of 2026 the play was still running. In March 2025 the London run exceeded 30,000 performances.
Witness for the Prosecution	Theatre Royal, Nottingham	28 September 1953	1954	Samuel French Ltd.	Based upon the 1925 short story "The Witness for the Prosecution"
Spider's Web	Theatre Royal, Nottingham	27 September 1954	1957	Samuel French Ltd.	Novelised by Charles Osborne in 2000 as Spider's Web
Towards Zero	Theatre Royal, Nottingham	6 August 1956	1957	Samuel French Ltd.	With Gerald Verner; based on the novel Towards Zero
Verdict	Grand Theatre, Wolverhampton	22 February 1958	1958	Samuel French Ltd.	
The Unexpected Guest	Duchess Theatre	12 August 1958	1958	Samuel French Ltd.	Novelised by Charles Osborne in 1999 as The Unexpected Guest
Go Back for Murder	Duchess Theatre	23 March 1960	1960	Samuel French Ltd.	Based on the novel Five Little Pigs
Rule of Three	Duchess Theatre	20 December 1962	1963	Samuel French Ltd.	Contains three works: Afternoon at the Sea-side, The Patient and The Rats
Fiddlers Three	Kings Theatre, Southsea	7 June 1971			
Akhnaton	New York	1979	1973	William Collins & Sons	First produced under the title Akhnaton and Nefertiti.
Chimneys	Pitlochry Festival Theatre Company	1 June 2006			Unpublished. Written in 1931 and forgotten until the early 1980s when the script was discovered in the British Library Archive. Its existence was suppressed for 20 years at the request of Christie's daughter, but eventually came to light when it was discovered by another researcher who was unaware of the request. The play was unperformed until 2006. Based on the 1925 novel The Secret of Chimneys.
The Lie	Paignton, Devon	15 September 2018			Unpublished. Written in the 1920s and discovered by Julius Green in the Christie archive while doing research for Curtain Up.

Other unpublished scripts
The Conqueror	One act play
Teddy Bear	One act play
Eugenia and Eugenics	One act play
The Clutching Hand	Full-length play. Adapted from: The Exploits of Elaine, a novel by Arthur B. Reeve (1915)
The Last Seance	One act play
Ten Years	One act play
Marmalade Moon	One act play
Someone at the Window	Full-length play. Adapted from Agatha Christie's short story "The Dead Harlequin"
Miss. Perry	Full-length play
Bleak House	Full-length movie script. Adapted from the Charles Dickens novel

== Notes and references ==
=== Sources ===
- Dalby, Richard (June 2004). "Agatha Christie's Hercule Poirot". The Book and Magazine Collector (243). Diamond Publishing Group.
- Engelhardt, Sandra (2011). The Investigators of Crime in Literature. Marburg, Germany: Tectum Verlag. ISBN 978-3-8288-8560-8.
- Fitzgibbon, Russell H. (1980). The Agatha Christie Companion. Bowling Green, OH: Bowling Green State University Popular Press. ISBN 978-0-87972-138-1.
- Hall, Anthony (May 1984). "Agatha Christie, the Queen of Crime". The Book and Magazine Collector (3). Diamond Publishing Group.
- Haycraft, Howard (1941). Murder For Pleasure: The Life and Times of the Detective Story. New York, NY: D. Appleton-Century Company. OCLC 609578112.
- Keating, H.R.F. (1988). "Agatha Christie". In Benstock, Bernard; Staley, Thomas (eds.). Dictionary of Literary Biography: British Mystery Writers, 1920–1939. Detroit: Gale Research. ISBN 978-0-7876-3072-0.
- Morgan, Janet (2015). "Christie, Dame Agatha Mary Clarissa (1890–1976)". Oxford Dictionary of National Biography (online ed.). Oxford University Press. doi:10.1093/ref:odnb/30926. (Subscription, Wikipedia Library access or UK public library membership required.)
- Zemboy, James (2008). The Detective Novels of Agatha Christie: A Reader's Guide. Jefferson, NC: McFarland & Company. ISBN 978-0-7864-5168-5.
