= Surprise! Surprise! (short story collection) =

1965 collection of twelve short stories written by Agatha Christie

First edition

Surprise! Surprise! A Collection of Mystery Stories with Unexpected Endings is a collection of twelve short stories written by Agatha Christie published by Dodd, Mead and Company in 1965. All of the stories in the collection had appeared in other short story collections. Dell published a paperback edition in May,1966, with thirteen short stories including the addition of "The Plymouth Express", from The Under Dog and Other Stories.

== Story list ==
- "Double Sin" – From Double Sin and Other Stories
- "The Arcadian Deer" – From The Labours of Hercules
- "The Adventure of Johnnie Waverly" - From Three Blind Mice and Other Stories
- "Where There’s A Will" – From The Witness for the Prosecution and Other Stories
- "Greenshaw’s Folly" – From Double Sin and Other Stories
- "The Case of the Perfect Maid" – From Three Blind Mice and Other Stories
- "At the Bells and Motley" – From The Mysterious Mr Quin
- "The Case of the Distressed Lady" – From Mr. Parker Pyne, Detective
- "The Third Floor Flat" – From Three Blind Mice and Other Stories
- "The Mystery of the Spanish Shawl" – From The Witness for the Prosecution and Other Stories
- "The Cornish Mystery" – From The Under Dog and Other Stories
- "The Witness for the Prosecution" – From The Witness for the Prosecution and Other Stories
