= Unfinished Portrait (novel) =

1934 novel by Agatha Christie

- Dust-jacket illustration of the first UK and US editions
- Author: Mary Westmacott (pseudonym of Agatha Christie)
- Cover artist: Hookway Cowles
- Language: English
- Genre: Tragedy
- Publisher: Collins
- Publication date: March 1934
- Publication place: United Kingdom
- Media type: Print (hardback & paperback)
- Pages: 320 pp
- Preceded by: Murder on the Orient Express
- Followed by: The Listerdale Mystery

Unfinished Portrait is a semi-autobiographical novel written by Agatha Christie and first published in the UK by Collins in March 1934 and in the US by Doubleday later in the same year. The British edition retailed for seven shillings and sixpence (7/6) and the US edition at $2.00. It is the second of six novels Christie wrote under the pen name Mary Westmacott.

== Plot summary ==
In the midst of divorce, bereft of the only people in her life she cares for, Celia considers taking her life. But, while on an exotic island, Celia meets Larraby, a successful portrait painter, who spends a night talking with her, and learning her deepest fears. Larraby leaves Celia with the hope that he may be the one to help her come to terms with her past.

== Literary significance and reception ==
The Times Literary Supplement review of 12 April 1934 outlined the plot and stated that, "The artist who re-tells Celia's story ends several sentences in every paragraph with dots, a mannerism that irritates; but we must forgive him, since, in the final chapter, he heals Celia's soul in one unpredictable instant."

The New York Times Book Review of 9 December 1934 said of the plot construction of Celia telling Larraby her life history that, "This literary device seems artificial and unnecessary at first, but is effectively used in the ending." They concluded, "As a study of a shy, emotional nature, verging on the pathological, Unfinished Portrait is moderately well done. It is worth reading for its sympathetic – and sometimes very amusing – account of Celia's childhood. And in Celia's Grannie it introduces a grand old lady – an indomitable Victorian with a keen love of life, a fine hand for managing 'the men', and a gruesome interest in the final takings-off of the many friends and relatives whom she survived."

== Publication history ==
- 1934, William Collins & Sons (London), March 1934, Hardcover, 320 pp
- 1934, Doubleday (New York), 1934, Hardcover, 323 pp
- 1964, Dell Books (New York), Paperback, 284 pp
- 1972, Arbor House (New York), Hardcover, 284 pp
- 1986, Fontana Books (Imprint of HarperCollins), Paperback, ISBN 0-00-617373-X

The first editions in both the UK and US used the same dustjacket illustration by Hookway Cowles. The only other occurrences of this happening for Christie's publications were for The Mysterious Affair at Styles (1920) and Star Over Bethlehem and other stories (1965).

=== Book dedication ===
As with all the Westmacott books, except Giant's Bread, this book carried no dedication.

=== Dustjacket blurb ===
The blurb on the inside flap of the dustjacket of the first edition reads:

In a Spanish garden overlooking the sea an artist comes upon a solitary woman. He goes away, not wishing to disturb her solitude, but is suddenly impelled to rush back, realising that she means to commit suicide. To save her he takes her back to her hotel and spends the night in her room while she tells him the story of her life. It begins with her childhood, Celia – the name by which the artist calls her, not knowing her real one – was a reserved, highly imaginative, shy and inarticulate child. Occasionally she has a strange dream in which she sees a malevolent-eyed man, a figure which haunts her throughout her life. He is psychologically her symbol for fear. At fifteen she goes to Paris to study music. She becomes a very fine pianist and a good singer, but her temperament handicaps her and prevents her doing herself justice in public. Her mother takes her to Egypt for a winter season, where her beauty and good dancing make her a success with men in spite of her shyness. Celia attracts many admirers, including Major De Burgh, a sensualist who writes her wonderful love letters but is less pleasing in the flesh; Jim Grant, an intensely practical youth, to whom Celia becomes engaged, but who frankly bores her; and Peter Maitland, easy-going, lovable and tenderly devoted. She promises to marry Peter, but while he is in India with his regiment she meets Dermot, who sweeps her off her feet with his egotistical devotion and insists on their being married almost at once. For several years they are happy, but finally she divorces him. For years she travels, a woman whom many men have loved, but never yet has found love. A prey to her own fears, to her refusal to face up to realities, she comes at last to the place where the artist had found her. In a very moving scene she recognises in the artist the incarnation of her ideals and desires.
