= Albert Flynn =

British civil servant and author (1863-1933)

Sir Albert Flynn KCB
- Born: Joshua Albert Flynn; 15 September 1863; Sheerness, Kent
- Died: 8 October 1933 (aged 70)
- Education: University of London
- Occupations: Civil servant and author
- Writing career
- Pen name: Owen Oliver
- Genre: Science fiction

Sir Joshua Albert Flynn KCB (15 September 1863 – 8 October 1933) was a British civil servant who served in South Africa with Lord Kitchener. He was made a Companion of the Order of the Bath in 1910 and knighted in 1919. He was later director of army accounts and subsequently director-general of finance at the Ministry of Pensions. He wrote three novels, one non-fiction work, and over 250 science fiction, romance and adventure stories under the pen name of "Owen Oliver" that were published in the popular magazines of the early 20th century.

== Early life and family ==
Joshua Albert Flynn was born in Sheerness, Kent, on 15 September 1863, the eldest son of Albert Spencer Flynn. He was educated at private schools and King's College, London, and graduated in mental and moral science from the University of London in 1891. He married Ada, the youngest daughter of James Parkinson, in 1886 and had two sons and three daughters.

== Career ==
Flynn worked as a senior civil servant in the Admiralty in 1884 and the War Office from 1885. He was financial adviser to Lord Kitchener in South Africa and director of army accounts from 1904. He was appointed director-general of finance at the Ministry of Pensions in 1916. He was made a companion of the Order of the Bath in 1910 and knighted in 1919. He retired in 1920. In 1928 he published The Problems of the Civil Service in which he gave much attention to recruitment and promotion, observing that membership of the senior administrative class was in practice restricted to those that had attended Britain's elite universities.

== Writing ==
He wrote science fiction, romance, and adventure stories under the pen name of Owen Oliver that were published in the popular magazines of the early 20th century, producing over 250 between 1901 and 1934, including 27 for the science fiction orientated The Yellow Magazine, a sister to Harmsworth's Red Magazine and The Green Magazine, all published by Amalgamated Press. Flynn's science fiction often dealt with the threat to the Earth from an external peril, such as in "The Black Shadow" (1903) in which the remnants of a lunar civilisation are able to control human beings on Earth. In "The Plague of Lights" (1904), aliens invade the Earth, while in "The Long Night" (1906) the nights gradually lengthen due to the effect on the Earth of a comet. In "Days of Darkness" (1927), London is plunged into inexplicable darkness, throwing the city into chaos. "A Martyr to Wireless" (1924) takes a different approach with the invading force being the new technology of radio broadcasting which threatens marital harmony when it enters the home. Flynn's romantic fiction featured in The Windsor Magazine and included titles such as "Little Love" (1906/07), "They Called it Love" (1909/10), and "A House of Love" (1910).

== Death ==
Flynn died on 8 October 1933. His address at the time of his death was 6 Thornton Avenue, Streatham. Probate was granted to Albert James Flynn, engineer, and Walter Alan Flynn, medical practitioner, on an estate of £6,121. He received an obituary in The Times.

== Selected publications ==
All as "Owen Oliver".

=== Short stories ===
- "The Black Shadow", Cassell's Magazine, February 1903
- "Out of the Deep", The London Magazine, July 1904.
- "The Plague of Lights: A Tale of the Year 1906", The London Magazine, October 1904.
- "The Long Night: A Story of the Next Decade", Pearson's Magazine, January 1906.
- "Little Love", The Windsor Magazine, Vol. 25 (1906/07), pp. 796–803.
- "The Gardener", The Windsor Magazine, Vol. 28 (1908), pp. 583–590.
- "The Box of Tricks", The Windsor Magazine, Vol. 30 (1909), pp. 65–70.
- "They Called it Love", The Windsor Magazine, Vol. 31 (1909/10), pp. 305–314.
- "The Annihilator", Munsey's Magazine, August 1910.
- "A House of Love", The Windsor Magazine, Vol. 32 (1910), pp. 643–648.
- "The Cloud-Men", Munsey's Magazine, August 1911, pp. 630–637.
- "The Soul Machine", The Pall Mall Magazine, November 1911.
- "Platinum", All-Story Weekly, 5 August 5, 1916.
- "The Pretty Woman", All-Story Weekly, 24 March 1917.
- "A Martyr to Wireless", The Yellow Magazine, 1924.
- "Days of Darkness", The London Magazine, April 1927.

=== Novels ===
- An Author's Daughter. C. A. Pearson, London, 1918.
- A Knight at Heart. Hodder & Stoughton, London, 1925.
- Red Blood: A Serial Story of the South Sea. Harmsworth's Red Magazine, London, 1921. (4 instalments)

=== Non-fiction ===
- The Problems of the Civil Service. Cassell & Co., London, 1928. (As Sir Albert Flynn)

== See also ==
- Oliver Onions
