= Revolution and Other Essays =

Collection of essays and stories by Jack London

Revolution and Other Essays is a collection of 13 essays and stories by Jack London published in 1910 by The Macmillan Company. The collection includes fictional stories and essays. Most, but not all, of its contents concern socialism and injustice.

== Contents ==
"Revolution", the first essay in the book, extols Jack London's renunciation of Capitalism in favor of Socialism. Contents include: "Revolution", "The Somnambulists", "The Dignity of Dollars", "Goliah", "The Golden Poppy", "The Shrinkage of the Planet", "The House Beautiful", "The Gold Hunters of the North", "Fomá Gordyéeff", "These Bones Shall Rise Again", "The Other Animals", "The Yellow Peril", and "What Life Means to Me". It was reprinted in 1912 as part of the Macmillan Standard Library series.

"Goliah" was originally published in 1908 in Red Magazine and was also published by Thorp Springs Press in 1974. It depicts a society transformed.

== Reviews ==
The book was reviewed overall favorably by the Tampa Times in 1910, though the reviewer was less pleased with the namesake essay.
