= The Golden Ball and Other Stories =

1971 short story collection written by Agatha Christie

- Dust-jacket illustration of the first US edition
- Author: Agatha Christie
- Language: English
- Genre: Detective fiction short stories
- Publisher: Dodd, Mead and Company
- Publication date: 1971
- Publication place: United Kingdom; United States
- Media type: Print (hardback & paperback)
- Pages: 280 first edition, hardcover)
- ISBN: 055335065X
- Preceded by: Nemesis
- Followed by: Elephants Can Remember

The Golden Ball and Other Stories is a short story collection written by Agatha Christie and first published in the US by Dodd, Mead and Company in 1971 in an edition priced at $5.95. It contains fifteen short stories, all of which were originally published from 1925 through 1934.

Various of the stories appear in other short story collections published in the UK before or after this collection, The Listerdale Mystery (1934 UK), The Hound of Death and Other Stories (1933, UK) and Problem at Pollensa Bay and Other Stories (1991, UK).

== Plot summaries ==
=== The Listerdale Mystery ===
Mrs St Vincent is a genteel lady living in reduced circumstances with her son and daughter, Rupert and Barbara. After her husband's financial speculations went wrong, he died, and they were forced to vacate the house, which had been in their family for generations. They now live in rooms in a boarding house (which has seen better times) and, due to these surroundings, are unable to entertain people of similar class and upbringing. Rupert has just started a job in the city, with excellent prospects but, at this point in time, only a small income. Barbara enjoyed a trip to Egypt the previous winter with – and paid for by – her richer cousin. On this trip she met a young man called Jim Masterson, who is interested in courting her, but who would be put off if he saw their reduced circumstances. Looking through the Morning Post, Mrs St. Vincent sees an advertisement for a house to let in Westminster, furnished, and with a nominal rent. Although she thinks she has little chance of being able to afford the house, she goes to see the house agents and then the house itself, and is instantly taken with it and pleasantly surprised at its very low rent. The agents offer her the house for a six-month rental. Barbara is delighted, but Rupert is suspicious – the house belonged to Lord Listerdale, who disappeared eighteen months previously and supposedly turned up in East Africa, supplying his cousin, Colonel Carfax, with power of attorney. They take the house and are looked after in style by Quentin, the butler, whose wages are paid for by Lord Listerdale's estate, as are the wages of the two other servants. Delicious food regularly turns up on the table. It is sent up regularly from his Lordship's country seat of King's Cheviot – an old custom.

After three months, Mrs St. Vincent is very happy in the house and Jim has proposed to Barbara. Rupert still entertains his suspicions, and is somewhat convinced that Listerdale is not in Africa, but has perhaps been murdered, and his body hidden in the house. Rupert also suspects Quentin of being part of whatever plot has occurred. Rupert goes on a motorcycling holiday, which takes him near to King's Cheviot. Spotting someone who resembles Quentin, he questions the man, who tells him he is really called Quentin; was butler to Lord Listerdale; but retired on a pension to an estate cottage some time before. Rupert brings the real butler to London and to confronts the fake one. The real butler tells an astonished St. Vincent family that the fake is in fact Lord Listerdale himself. His Lordship explains that, ashamed of his selfish life to date, he faked his relocation to Africa, and has since spent his time helping people like the St. Vincents, whose lives have been reduced to something akin to begging. Over the past few months, he has fallen in love with Mrs St. Vincent, and now proposes marriage to the delighted lady.

=== The Girl in The Train ===
George Rowland is a mildly dissolute young man who is dependent on his rich uncle for both his keep and his job at the family's city firm. Annoyed with his nephew's late night carousing, his uncle sacks him. Annoyed in turn with his uncle, George makes plans to leave home. Abandoning ambitious plans to go to the colonies, George decides instead to travel by train from Waterloo to a place he spots in an ABC guide called Rowland's Castle where he is sure he will be welcomed with open arms by the feudal inhabitants. He is happily alone in the first class carriage when a girl jumps onto the train begging to be hidden. George chivalrously hides her under the train seat before a moustached foreign man appears at the window and "demands" his niece back. George calls a platform guard who detains the foreign man, and the train departs.

The girl introduces herself as Elizabeth but tells George that she can't give him an explanation of her actions. At the next station, she gets off the train. While speaking to George through the window, she spots a man with a small dark beard further down the platform getting into the train and tells George to keep an eye on him and to guard safely a package that she hands to him.

George follows the bearded man down to Portsmouth, books into the same commercial hotel, and watches him carefully. He is aware that there is another, ginger-haired man carefully watching both of them. He follows the bearded man as he goes on a quick walk through the streets, which ends up taking them both back to their hotel with no sign of any assignation. George wonders if the bearded man has spotted that he is being watched. His suspicions grow further when the ginger-haired man returns to the hotel, also seemingly after a night's walk. His puzzlement increases when two foreign men call at the hotel and ask George (although calling him "Lord Rowland") where the Grand Duchess Anastasia of Catonia, a small Balkan state, has gone to. The younger of the two men grows violent but George is able to subdue him with Jiu-Jitsu. The two men leave, uttering threats.

That night, George watches the black-bearded man as he secretes a small packet behind the skirting board in the bathroom. Returning to his own room, George finds the package Elizabeth gave him has gone from its hiding place under the pillow. After breakfast, the package has returned to his room but, investigating its contents at last, George finds only a box with a wedding ring inside it. He hears from the chambermaid that she is unable to gain access to the black-bearded man's room and decides to gain access himself via a parapet outside the window. He deduces that the man escaped via the fire escape just before he hears a noise from inside the wardrobe and, investigating, is attacked from within by the ginger-haired man. The latter identifies himself as DI Jarrold of Scotland Yard. The black-bearded man was called Mardenberg and was a foreign spy who secreted the plans of the Portsmouth harbour defences behind the skirting board. His accomplice is a young girl, and George wonders if this could have been Elizabeth? He is on the train back to London when he reads of a secret wedding between the Grand Duchess Anastasia of Catonia and Lord Roland Gaigh. At the next station Elizabeth gets onto the train and explains events to George. She was acting as a decoy for Anastasia to throw her uncle, who opposed the romance, off the scent, and the black-bearded man and the packet were simply a ruse to distract George – another wedding ring could easily have been procured, and George's adventures with the spy were a remarkable coincidence. George realises that Elizabeth is actually Lord Gaigh's sister. He proposes to her. His uncle will be delighted he is marrying into the aristocracy, and Elizabeth's parents, with five daughters, will be delighted that she is marrying into money. She accepts.

=== The Manhood of Edward Robinson ===
Edward Robinson is a young man firmly under the thumb of his fiancée, Maud, who does not wish to rush into marriage until his prospects and income improve. He is a romantic at heart who wishes he was masterful and rugged like the men he reads of in novels. Somewhat impetuous in nature, he enters a competition and wins the first prize of £500. He doesn't tell Maud of this, knowing she will insist the money is wisely invested for the future, and instead uses it to buy a small two-seater car. On Christmas Eve, on holiday from his work as a clerk, he goes for a drive into the country. Stopping off in the dark evening at the Devil's Punch Bowl, he gets out of his car to admire the view and takes a short walk. He returns to his vehicle and drives back to London but on the way, reaching into the door pocket for his muffler, he instead finds a diamond necklace. In shock, he realises that although it is the same model car as his, it is not the same car. By coincidence, he got into the wrong car after his walk and drove off. He returns to the Punch Bowl but his car has gone. Searching further, he finds a note in the car he is driving which gives instructions to meet someone at a local village at ten o'clock. He keeps the assignation and meets a beautiful woman in evening dress and cloak who thinks he is someone called Gerald. Telling her his name is Edward, she is not thrown by the mistake and in conversation reveals that 'Gerald's' brother is called Edward but she hasn't seen him since she was six years old. She gets in the car but realises quickly that Edward has only recently learnt to drive and takes the wheel herself. She tells Edward a story about her and 'Jimmy' having successfully stolen the necklace from a rich lady called Agnes Larella. She drives him to a London townhouse where the butler arranges evening dress for him and the lady drives them onto Ritson's – the nightclub of the rich and famous. He drinks cocktails and dances with the lady who he discovers is Lady Noreen Elliot, a famous society debutante and the theft of the necklace was in fact an elaboration of a treasure hunt, the rule being that the 'stolen' item must be worn in public for one hour to claim the prize. As Edward and Lady Noreen leave the nightclub, the real Gerald turns up in Edward's car and also reveals Edward not to be the one Noreen thought he was. Edward hurriedly retrieves his car and is about to drive off when Noreen begs him to 'be a sport' and give her the necklace so she can return it. He does so and receives a passionate kiss in return.

Edward arrives at Maud's home in Clapham the next day. He happily admits to the competition win and buying the car and tells her that he means to marry her next month, despite her objections. Maud is much taken with her newly masterful fiancé and agrees.

=== Jane in Search of a Job ===
Jane Cleveland, a young woman of twenty-six, is in need of a job. Her financial position is precarious and she lives in a shabby boarding house. Browsing the Daily Leader jobs column, she finds nothing of note, but in the personal column she sees an advert for a young woman of her age, build and height who is a good mimic and can speak French. She goes to the address given and is one of many girls queuing up in answer to the advert. Getting through to the final six, she is interviewed by a foreign gentleman and told to go to Harridge's hotel and ask for Count Streptitch. Presenting herself there as instructed, Jane is again interviewed by the Count and then introduced to an ugly middle-aged lady by the title of Princess Poporensky who both declare her to be suitable. They ask Jane if she doesn't mind the prospect of danger, to which she answers that she doesn't. Finally, Jane is introduced to the Grand Duchess Pauline of Ostrava, exiled from her country after a Communist revolution. Jane is similar in looks and colouring to the Grand Duchess although she is slightly smaller in height. It is explained to Jane that the Grand Duchess is the target of assassination attempts by the people who overthrew and slaughtered her family and that they want Jane to act as a decoy for her during the next two weeks when she is in Britain and has to attend several charitable events. Jane agrees and is given money to stay at the nearby Blitz hotel (under the assumed name of Miss Montresor of New York) and to buy a dress to wear when she is following the Grand Duchess to the events, during which they will swap dresses when they suspect that a kidnap or murder attempt is imminent. Jane suggests a bright red dress in contrast to the Grand Duchess' dress of choice for a charity bazaar at Orion House ten miles outside London and that she will wear high-heeled boots to cover up the difference in height.

Three days later, the bazaar is taking place. The main feature of it is that one-hundred society women will each donate one pearl, which will be auctioned the next day. The real Grand Duchess declares the bazaar open and meets the people there. When it is time to depart, she and Jane swap dresses in a side room, and Jane leaves in the Duchess' place – news having reached them that the assassins will make an attempt on the journey back to Harridge's. Jane is travelling back with the Princess Poporensky when the chauffeur takes them down a side road and down an unknown and secluded route, stops the car and holds up the two women with a pistol. They are at an empty house, which they are locked in. A short time later, bowls of soup are given to the two women, which Jane eats but the Princess refuses. Jane falls asleep suddenly...

The next day Jane wakes up. She is alone in the house and inexplicably back in her red dress. She finds a newspaper in the house, which states that the charity bazaar was held up by a girl in a red dress and three other men. They stole the pearls and got away. The girl in the red dress has been traced as staying at the Blitz hotel under the name of Miss Montresor of New York – Jane realises that she has been set up by a gang of jewel thieves. She hears someone in garden and finds a young man coming round from having been knocked out. He and Jane swap stories and the young man reveals that he was at the bazaar and was puzzled when he saw the Grand Duchess enter a room in low-heeled shoes and exit in high-heeled ones. He followed her to the empty house and saw a second car arrive with three men and a woman in a red dress. Presently, this woman came out in the Duchess' dress and all except Jane seemed to have departed but when the young man went to investigate he was knocked out. They suddenly become aware that another man is nearby and listening to them. He introduces himself as Detective-Inspector Farrell and, having overheard the stories that the two told, all has become clear to him; and he realises what really happened at the bazaar hold-up and that Jane is innocent. The young man reveals that having seen Jane at the bazaar, he has fallen in love with her...

=== A Fruitful Sunday ===
Dorothy Pratt, a housemaid, is enjoying a Sunday drive in a cheap old car with her young man, Edward Palgrove. They stop at a roadside fruit stall and buy a basket of fruit from the seller who tells them with a leer on his face that they are getting more than their money's worth. Stopping off near a stream, they sit by the road to eat the fruit and read in a discarded Sunday paper of the theft of a ruby necklace worth fifty thousand pounds. A moment later, they find such a necklace in the bottom of the basket! Edward is shocked and scared of the sight, seeing the possibility of arrest and imprisonment but Dorothy sees the possibility of a new and better life from selling the jewels to a 'fence'. Edward is shocked by the suggestion and demands that she hand them over which she reluctantly does.

The next day, Dorothy contacts Edward. She has come to her senses after a sleepless night and realises that they must hand the necklace back. On the way back from his office-clerk job that night, Edward reads the latest developments on the jewel robbery in the newspaper but it is another adjacent story, which catches his attention. He meets Dorothy that night and shows her the second story – it is about a successful advertising stunt in which one out of fifty baskets of fruit sold will contain an imitation necklace. To their mutual relief, they realise that they are not the possessors of the stolen necklace.

=== The Golden Ball ===
George Dundas is sacked by his uncle from his job for taking too much time off work. He is accused of not grasping the "golden ball of opportunity". Walking through the city, he is stopped by a society girl, Mary Montresor, in her expensive touring car who driving past Hyde Park Corner questions George as to whether or not he would like to marry her. Somewhat distracted by Mary's reckless driving, he has answered yes when he sees newspaper bills, which tell that Mary is to marry the Duke of Edgehill. Mary doesn't seem interested in her commitment and suggests they drive into the country and find a place to live. Going along with her, George agrees. Heading southwest they spot a house on the brow of a hill that Mary likes and go to investigate. Mary states that they will suggest to anyone that is there that they thought it belonged to a "Mrs Pardonstenger" to cover up their investigations. Peeping through the windows they are approached by a butler who does not seem surprised by the pseudonym Mary uses and asks them into the house. Once inside they are quickly accosted by a man and a woman. The man produces a revolver and tells George and Mary to go upstairs at gunpoint. At the top of the stairs, George suddenly fights back and knocks the man out badly. George is all for tying the man up but Mary begs him to leave the house, which they do, George taking the revolver with him. Once in the car, he checks the gun and is astonished to find that it isn't loaded. Mary confesses that the house is hers and the situation they found themselves in was staged by her as a test of any prospective husband and how he would react instinctively to protect her from danger. All so far have failed the test. The couple in the house were engaged by her for the purpose, the man being Rube Wallace, a film actor. As George has been proposed to and passed the test, he suggests getting a special licence for the wedding. Mary however wants him to go down on bended knee, which George refuses to do, telling her that it is degrading. When they arrive in London and he contrives to slip on a banana skin when he gets out of the car, thereby getting down on one knee. George enjoys going back to his uncle and telling him that he is going to marry a rich young society girl – he has grasped the golden ball!

=== The Rajah's Emerald ===
James Bond, a young man, is on holiday at a fashionable coastal resort with his young lady, Grace. They observe the proprieties of the age by staying in separate accommodation. He is in a cheap boarding house while she has put herself up in the high-class Esplanade Hotel on the front where she has discovered friends are staying – Claud Sopworth and his three sisters. At almost every opportunity James is being treated in a fairly cavalier manner by Grace and one more arises when Claud suggests they all go bathing in the sea. The Esplanade has its own changing huts on the beach, which James, as a non-resident, is not allowed to use. He therefore has to leave his "friends" and use the public huts, all of which have long queues. He takes a chance and uses an unlocked private hut belonging to one of the large private villas in the resort. After their sea-bathe, James changes back into his clothes which he left in the hut but doesn't join Grace or the others for lunch as he has taken offence at her jibes at the cheap trousers he is wearing. Eating in a dingy café, James is astounded to find a large emerald in his pocket. From reading stories in the resort's weekly paper, he has no doubt it belongs to the Rajah of Maraputna who is staying at Lord Edward Campion's private villa and that when he changed out of his bathing clothes, he put on the wrong trousers (the beach hut belonging to Lord Campion). Leaving the café he sees newspaper bills stating that the Rajah's emerald has been stolen. Wondering why a priceless emerald was left in a beach hut in the first place, he goes back to the hut to change back into his own trousers when he is suddenly stopped by a man who shows him his badge and identifies himself as Detective-Inspector Merrilees of Scotland Yard who is on the track of the emerald. James is arrested and claims that the emerald is at his lodging. The policeman is taking him back there but on the way they pass a police station and James suddenly grabs the man and shouts for the police himself, claiming that Merrilees has picked his pocket. The police search Merrilees and find the emerald, which James secreted there. James is in turned accused but Lord Campion arrives and identifies Merrilees as Jones, his suspected valet. What James doesn't tell Lord Campion is that the badge that "Merrilees" showed him was a badge for a cycling club that, by coincidence, James also belongs to. Lord Campion invites James to his villa for lunch, an invitation he is delighted to accept, also enjoying the opportunity to turn down a half-hearted invitation from Grace and the Sopwith siblings in the process.

=== Swan Song ===
Madame Paula Nazorkoff, the famous but temperamental operatic soprano, is in London for a short series of appearances. Her manager, Mr Cowan, has arranged five appearances at Covent Garden as well as a single appearance at the Albert Hall and also a performance of Madame Butterfly at the private theatre in the castle home of Lord and Lady Rustonbury where royalty will be present. The name seems familiar to Madame Nazorkoff and she realises that she read of it in an illustrated magazine, which is still with her in her Ritz Hotel room. Scanning through it, she immediately becomes less scornful of the idea but insists that the performance be changed to Tosca. Mr Cowan hears her mutter, "At last, at last – after all these years".

Preparations on the day at the home of Lord Rustonbury are going well until Signor Roscari, due to sing the part of Scarpia, suddenly falls strangely ill. Lady Rustonbury remembers that a nearby neighbour is Edouard Bréon, the retired French baritone and she drives off to ask him to step in at the last moment. He agrees and returns. In the hall of the castle he reminisces over past performances of Tosca that he has heard, stating that the best one was over twenty years before by a young girl called Bianca Capelli. She was foolish though as she was in love with a man involved with the Camorra and begged Breon to use his influence to save his life when he was condemned to death. Bréon states he did nothing for the man as he was not worth it and, after his execution, Capelli entered a convent. Blanche, the Rustonbury's daughter, watches Mr Cowan as Nazorkoff claims that as a Russian she is not so fickle.

The performance goes well and the invited audience are appreciative. The second act reaches its climax as the character of Tosca stabs Scarpia. After the curtain has fallen, one of stagehands rushes out and a doctor is called for. Nazorkoff was apparently so involved with her performance that she really did stab Bréon. Blanche knows differently though and she tells how she has realised that Nazorkoff was in fact Capelli, who has waited years for her revenge on the man who let her lover die – the story of Tosca has come to life. As the police take Nazorkoff away, she quotes another line from opera – "La commedia e finite!" ("The show is over").

=== The Hound of Death ===
William P Ryan, an American journalist, is having lunch with a friend called Anstruther when he hears that the latter is about to visit his sister in Folbridge, Cornwall, at her house called "Treane". Ryan has heard of the place, and tells a story from the recent First World War when he heard of a German attempt to take over a convent during the Rape of Belgium. As soon as the soldiers entered the building it blew up, killing them all. It was proven that the soldiers had no high explosives on them, and speaking with the locals afterwards Ryan was told of one of the nuns having miraculous powers: she brought down a lightning bolt from heaven that destroyed the convent and killed the Germans. All that was left of the building were two walls, one of which had a powder mark in the shape of a giant hound. This scared the local peasants who avoided the area after dark. The nun in question survived and went with other refugees to "Treane" in Cornwall, and Anstruther confirms that his sister did take in some Belgians at the time. In Cornwall, Anstruther finds out from his sister that the nun, Marie Angelique, is still in the area. She has constant hallucinations and is being studied by a new local young doctor by the name of Rose, who intends to write a monograph on her condition. Anstruther meets Rose and persuades him to let him meet the young nun.

She is boarding with the local district nurse. She talks of her dreams, but when Anstruther tells her of the story he heard from Ryan, she is shocked to realise that what she thought was a dream was true – that of unleashing the "Hound of Death" on the Germans as they approached the altar. She rambles on about the "City of Circles" and the "People of the Crystal", and when they have left her, Rose tells Anstruther that he has heard her mention crystals before, and on a previous occasion he produced a crystal and showed it to her to test her reaction. She gasped, "Then the faith still lives!"

The next day, the young nun tells Anstruther that she feels that the crystal is a symbol of faith, possibly a second Christ, and the faith has endured for many centuries. Rose tries a word association test in which Marie Angelique makes references to signs – and the sixth sign is destruction. Anstruther starts to feel uneasy about Rose's interest in the case, suspecting something more than purely medical motives. Some time later, Anstruther receives a letter from the nun in which she voices her fears of Rose and says that the doctor is trying to obtain her powers by progressing to the sixth sign. The same day he hears from his sister that both Rose and the nun are dead. A landslide swept away the cliffside cottage they were in, and the debris on the beach is in the shape of a giant hound. He also hears that Rose's rich uncle died the same night, struck by lightning, although there were no storms in the area, and the burn-mark on him is in an unusual shape. Remembering comments from Marie Angelique, Anstruther wonders if Rose acquired the ancient (or possibly future?) powers of the crystal but failed to control them properly, resulting in his own death. His fears are confirmed when he comes into possession of Rose's notes which detail his attempts to become a superman with "the Power of Death" in his hands.

=== The Gypsy ===
Dickie Carpenter breaks off his recent engagement to Esther Lawes and confides the reason to Mcfarlane, a dour Scot who is the fiancée of Rachel Lawes, Esther's younger sister. Dickie, a former naval man, has had an aversion to gypsies since his childhood, when he started to have recurring dreams in which a he would be in a given situation and suddenly feel a presence. When he looked up, a gypsy woman would be standing there looking at him. The sudden appearance of this woman always unnerved him, although it wasn't until some years after these dreams started that he encountered a real gypsy. This happened on a walk in the New Forest, and she warned him not to take a certain path. He ignored her and the wooden bridge he was crossing broke beneath his weight, casting him into the fast-running stream below and nearly drowning him.

These occurrences came back to him when he returned to England and started to see the Lawes family. At one dinner party he saw a woman called Alistair Haworth whom he seemed to see in his own eyes as wearing a red scarf on her head, just like the gypsy of his dreams. He walked on the terrace with her after dinner and she warned him not to go back into the house. He did so and found himself falling for Esther Lawes. They became engaged a week later and two weeks after that he again caught sight of Mrs Haworth who once more warned him. He again ignored her and that very night Esther stated that, after all, she didn't love him. The reason he is now confiding in Macfarlane is that he is due for a routine operation, and he thought he saw in one of the nurses in the hospital the image of Mrs Haworth, who warned him not to go ahead with the surgery.

Dickie subsequently dies during the operation and some impulse makes Macfarlane go to see Mrs Haworth at her moorland home. There he is surprised to find that her husband is not really suited to such a striking woman as her. The two walk on the moors and Mrs Haworth tells Macfarlane that he too has second sight. For proof, she asks him to look at a rock and he fancies he sees a hollow filled with blood. She tells him it is a sacrificial stone from olden times and he has had his own vision. She confides that she married her husband because she saw some portent hanging over him and wanted to prevent it. She also tells Macfarlane that they won't meet again.

Determined to challenge the fates, Macfarlane drives back from his inn to the Haworth's cottage the next day and finds that the lady is dead. She drank something poisonous thinking it was her tonic and her husband is beside himself with grief. Back at his inn, the landlady tells him stories of long-gone ghosts seen on the moor, including a sailor and a gypsy. Macfarlane wonders if they will walk again.

=== The Lamp ===
A Mrs Lancaster takes a lease on an empty house that sits in a square in an old cathedral town. Suspicious of the extremely low rent, she correctly guesses that the house is haunted and pushes the agent for details. He reluctantly tells her the version of the story that he has heard, about a man called Williams living there some thirty years ago with his young son. Williams went up to London for the day and, being a wanted man on the run, was arrested and jailed by the police. His young son was left to fend for himself in the house but died of starvation. The story goes that the boy's sobbing as he waits for his father to return can sometimes be heard.

Mrs Lancaster soon moves into the house with her elderly father, Mr Winburn, and her lively young son, Geoffrey. Mr Winburn knows that the house is haunted and hears another set of footsteps on the stairs following his grandson down. He also has a disturbing dream that he is in a town populated by no one but children who are begging him to know if he has "brought him". In addition, he overhears the servants gossiping about hearing a child cry. Somewhat oblivious to this, Geoffrey nevertheless asks his startled mother if he can play with the little boy that he sometimes sees watching him, but Mrs Lancaster brusquely stops all such talk. A month later, Geoffrey starts to fall ill and even his mother begins to hear the sobs of the other little boy with whom they seem to share the house. The doctor confesses to his grandfather that there is little they can do as Geoffrey's lungs were never strong. One night, Geoffrey dies and his mother and grandfather suddenly hear the sound of the other child's joyous laughter and the receding sound of two pairs of footsteps. The little boy has a playmate at last.

=== The Strange Case of Sir Arthur Carmichael ===
Dr Edward Carstairs, a noted psychologist, is called in to investigate the case of Sir Arthur Carmichael, a young man of twenty-three who woke up the previous morning at his estate in Herefordshire with a totally changed personality. Carstairs travels down there with a colleague called Dr Settle, who tells him that he feels that the house could be haunted, and that this phenomenon has connections with the case. The household consists of Sir Arthur, his stepmother, Lady Carmichael, his half-brother of eight years of age, and a Miss Phyllis Patterson to whom Arthur is engaged to be married. As their horse carriage comes up the drive, they see Miss Patterson walking across the lawn, and Carstairs remarks on the cat at her feet which provokes a startled reaction from Settle.

Going into the house, they make the acquaintance of Lady Carmichael and Miss Patterson, and again Carstairs causes a reaction when he mentions seeing the cat. They then see their patient and observe his strange behaviour – sitting hunched, without speaking, then stretching and yawning and drinking a cup of milk without using his hands.

After dinner that night, Carstairs hears a cat meowing, and this sound is repeated during the night outside his bedroom door, but he is unable to find the animal in the house. The next morning he does spy the cat from the bedroom window as it walks across the lawn and straight through a flock of birds which seem oblivious to its presence. He is further puzzled when Lady Carmichael insists that there is no cat in their home. Talking to a footman, Carstairs is informed that there used to be a cat, but it was destroyed a week ago and buried in the grounds. There are further appearances of this apparition, and they realise that it is targeting Lady Carmichael. Carstairs even dreams of the cat the following night: in the dream, he follows it into the library and it shows him to a gap in the volumes on the bookshelf. The next morning, Carstairs and Settle find that there is a book missing from that very spot in the room, and Carstairs glimpses the truth later on in the day when Sir Arthur jumps off his chair when he spots a mouse, and crouches near the wainscoting, waiting for it to appear.

That night, Lady Carmichael is badly attacked in her bed by the ghostly creature, and this prompts Carstairs to insist that the body of the dead cat be dug up. It is, and he sees that it is the very creature that he has spotted several times, and a smell shows that it was killed by prussic acid.

Several days pass, as Lady Carmichael starts to recover, until one day Sir Arthur falls into the water of the lake. Pulled out onto the bank, he is first thought that to be dead, but he comes round and he has also recovered his personality, but he has no recollection of the intervening days. The sight of him gives Lady Carmichael such a shock that she dies on the spot, and the missing book from the library is found – a volume on the subject of the transformation of people into animals. The inference is that lady Carmichael used the book to put Sir Arthur's soul into the cat, then killed it to ensure that her own son would inherit the title and estate. As stated at the beginning of the story, Carstairs later died, and his notes containing the details of the case were subsequently found.

=== The Call of Wings ===
Millionaire Silas Hamer and East-End Parson Dick Borrow, after having dinner with their friend Bertrand Seldon, discuss how they are completely opposite in nature, yet both contentedly happy. Hamer is economically happy because he has risen from his poverty-ridden background and built up a fortune, whereas Borrow is spiritually happy because he aids the poor. The two go their separate ways home, and on his way Silas witnesses a homeless man being hit by a bus and killed. Thinking he could have saved the man, Silas goes home mentally troubled.

Before he goes through his front door, he hears a legless piper playing a tune that he feels lifts him off the ground in joy. Having heard this tune for several days before falling asleep, he thinks that he floats around his bedroom with joy, witnessing amazing scenes of red sand, and a completely new colour that he nicknames Wing Colour. However, every time something pulls him back to the ground, causing him physical pain. He talks to his friend Seldon about it, to which the nerve-specialist replies he should talk to the piper and ask about the music.

Silas confronts the piper, and demands to know who he is. In response, the piper draws a picture of the faun god Pan (who has goat's legs) playing his pipes on a rock, and saying "They were evil", implying that the piper is the god Pan, who had his legs cut off to appear human. Now addicted to the music, Silas feels that his wealth is the only thing stopping him from reaching true happiness. In response, he donates all of his money to Dick Borrow, so that he can help the whole of East London. Deciding to get the train home, Silas waits and the platform with a homeless man. The man, in a drunken stupor, walks to the edge and accidentally falls off as the train is about to arrive. Remembering the man hit by a bus, Silas pulls the man off the tracks and throws him onto the platform, himself falling onto the tracks in the process. Before he is killed, he briefly hears a piper playing.

=== Magnolia Blossom ===
Vincent Easton awaits Theodora Darrell at the train station. They plan to travel, first stopping at Dover. He has known her only two weeks, and is totally in love with her. They met at her own home in Chelsea, in London, introduced by husband Richard Darrell. Their first kiss was under the magnolia tree in bloom at that house.

Arriving at the hotel in Dover, Theodora picks up a newspaper. The headline article is about the smash of her husband's financial firm and other firms that will also fail. She thinks it too much for him to lose that and her on the same day, and she leaves Vincent to return home. Vincent is angry and disappointed to lose her before they could be alone together.

Richard tells her all is lost at the firm but her marriage settlement, her house, are safe. After three days at home, she persuades Richard to tell her all. He admits that he has criminal liability leading to the smash, tied to his actions regarding land in South Africa. He had asked his wife to wear a particularly attractive dress for dinner that evening, which she did. After dinner he tells her the evidence of his criminality is documented in papers now held by Vincent Easton. Will she go there, ask him for those papers? She refuses. Richard begs and pleads based on their marriage, and then threatens suicide. She relents, thinking how she does not love Richard, but his crime was against society not against her, though she always knew he was not "straight", not honest.

Vincent is surprised to see her, and comments on how lovely she looks. Theo explains why she is there. Vincent knew there was fraud at that company, but thought it was committed by an underling, not by Richard, the top man. Vincent gives her the papers, which she burns on the spot without reading.

She is strained, too tense to return home directly. She takes time in a park to reflect, then proceeds home. Richard remarks on how long she was out, and implies that Vincent must have extracted a price from her, compromised her, for those papers. When this incorrect assumption is clear to Theo, she realises why Richard asked her to wear that particular dress, expecting to ask her to get those papers back. Richard had not known of her plan to leave him, but he had noticed how Vincent liked her.

Now Richard has used her, not been honest with her, and she cannot tolerate that. To "pay for her sins", she leaves him, for a life of loneliness.

Richard sees the last petal fall from the magnolia tree as she drives away.

=== Next to a Dog ===
Joyce Lambert wants a job that lets her come home at the end of each day, a day job. The agency, registry office, has only jobs requiring her to travel. She has Terry her old dog at home. She has loved the dog since her husband Michael gave him to her, 12 years earlier. Michael died in the Great War, and Joyce misses him so much. Terry gets all her affection, old and half-blind as he is. She is 29 years old, feeling much older.

Mrs Barnes, her landlady, is kind, and will not put her out.

Joyce has no money and she does not eat enough. She is too proud to "cadge" a meal with a friend.

Feeling she is at the end of her rope, she calls Arthur Halliday, a friend of her late husband. Halliday is wealthy and rather coarse. He has asked her to marry him. This day she says yes, adding to remember, I do not love you. He accepts that, as he always gets his way in the end.

The next day, Terry is at the window, sunning. He hears dogs and leans out to see better. He falls down to the ground. Joyce runs down to find the dog badly injured. A man hears this and helps her get the dog to Jobling the vet. She must leave Terry there. Not long after she gets home, Jobling telephones to tell her the dog died. He sends the dog to her home, to be buried.

Halliday returns, to be turned down. Terry is dead, Joyce no longer needs to marry Halliday. She tells him he is brutal, go away. He goes.

Joyce is very sad, but she knows her next step. At the registry office, she says she can now take a job requiring travel. A man is there interviewing candidates to travel with his family to the continent. His family includes an old aunt and his three-year-old son. The man is a widower for a year. He finds her suitable, and she accepts the position. He then asks how her dog is. His reply is comforting. She did not recognize him as the man who helped her. Mr Allaby gives her an advance to get ready for the travel next week.

== Publication history ==
- 1971, Dodd Mead and Company (New York), Hardcover, 280 pp
- 1972, Dell Books, Paperback, 235 pp
- 2012, Audio book, HarperAudio, ISBN 9780062243836 – narrators Hugh Fraser and Christopher Lee

=== First publication ===
- The Listerdale Mystery was first published in issue 250 of The Grand Magazine in December 1925.
- The Girl in the Train was first published in issue 228 of The Grand Magazine in February 1924.
- The Manhood of Edward Robinson was first published in issue 238 of The Grand Magazine in December 1924.
- Jane in Search of a Job was first published in issue 234 of The Grand Magazine in August 1924.
- A Fruitful Sunday was first published in the Daily Mail on 11 August 1928 with an uncredited illustration.
- The Golden Ball was first published as Playing the Innocent in the Daily Mail on 5 August 1929 with an illustration by Lowtham.
- The Rajah's Emerald was first published in issue 420 of the fortnightly The Harmsworth Red Magazine on 30 July 1926, with an illustration by Jack M Faulks.
- Swan Song was first published in issue 259 of The Grand Magazine in September 1926.
- Magnolia Blossom was first published in issue 329 of The Royal Magazine in March 1926.
- Next to a Dog was first published in The Grand Magazine, Issue 295, September 1929.
- The Hound of Death, The Gypsy, The Lamp, The Strange Case of Sir Arthur Carmichael, and The Call of Wings all appeared first in the 1933 UK publication of the collection titled The Hound of Death and Other Stories.

== Adaptations ==
Several of these short stories have been adapted for radio, television or the stage.

Magnolia Blossom was adapted in 1982 as part of the Thames Television series based on short stories by Agatha Christie, The Agatha Christie Hour, featuring Ciaran Madden as Theo, Ralph Bates as Vincent and Jeremy Clyde as Richard. The BBC did an adaptation for radio in February 2002, with Emilia Fox as Theodora Darrell, Julian Rhind-Tutt as Vincent, and Alex Jennings as Richard. The television adaptation is available in the 2020 decade on Streaming television platforms such as Acorn or Apple TV+, while the radio adaptation is occasionally aired on BBC Radio 4, and available on Audible (service), a subscription service for audio presentations.
