= Three Blind Mice and Other Stories =

Collection of short stories written by Agatha Christie

- Dust-jacket illustration of the first US edition
- Author: Agatha Christie
- Language: English
- Genre: Detective fiction short stories
- Publisher: Dodd, Mead and Company
- Publication date: 1950
- Publication place: United Kingdom; United States
- Media type: Print (hardback & paperback)
- Pages: 250
- Preceded by: A Murder Is Announced
- Followed by: They Came to Baghdad

Three Blind Mice and Other Stories is a collection of short stories by the English writer Agatha Christie, first published in the US by Dodd, Mead and Company in 1950. The first edition retailed at $2.50.

Stories from the collection later appeared in the British collections The Adventure of the Christmas Pudding (1960), Poirot's Early Cases (1974), Miss Marple's Final Cases and Two Other Stories (1979), and Problem at Pollensa Bay (1992). The title story, an alternative version of the play The Mousetrap, has not been published in book form in the UK, as the play is still running.

== Plot summaries ==
=== Three Blind Mice ===
During a blinding snowstorm, a homicidal maniac traps a small group of people in an isolated boarding house. Giles and Molly Davis have just inherited Monkswell Manor from Molly's Aunt Katherine, and they have decided to open it as a guest house. During a heavy blizzard, an intriguing cast of characters are trapped together, yet not everything is what it appears. After one of the guests is found dead, the question is, who is the killer? Well, it can only be someone on the inside. It is a tale of intrigue and murder coming from the past. Is everyone who they say they are? Who will live through the night? Will the murderer who kills to the tune of Three Blind Mice kill them all?

Characters:

- Mrs. Lyon
- Molly
- Giles
- Mrs. Boyle
- Christopher Wren
- Major Metcalf
- Mr. Paravicini
- Detective Sergeant Trotter

=== Strange Jest ===
During a party hosted by Miss Marple's friend Jane Helier, Miss Marple is approached by a young couple who need her help. The couple was promised by their uncle that when he died they would inherit a great fortune. Yet, when the uncle died, he left them a letter telling them that their inheritance was hidden. The couple invites Miss Marple to their family home. She sets out to clear up the mystery and help this couple find their happiness.

Characters:

- Uncle Mathew
- Charmian Rossiter
- Edward Rossiter
- Miss Marple

=== The Case of the Perfect Maid ===
Miss Marple comes to the aid of Inspector Slack once again. The Skinner sisters are a mystery to the village. While one sister lies around suffering from mysterious ailments, the other manages everything she needs. Then the sisters fire their maid, Gladys, claiming she is a thief, only to have things continue to disappear. Now the perfect maid has come to replace her, but when the perfect maid goes missing, who do you get to help solve the crime?

Characters:

- Edna
- Miss Marple
- Gladys Holmes
- Emily Skinner
- Lavinia Skinner
- Mary Higgins
- Mrs. Devereux
- Mrs. Carmichael

=== Tape-Measure Murder ===
Miss Marple is called as a character witness for Mr. Spenlow, who is accused of murdering his wife. This is because Mr. Spenlow seems to be unaffected by the loss of his wife. With the help of her friend Colonel Melchett and the incredulous Inspector Slack, Miss Marple searches for the truth about who really killed Mrs. Spenlow. Will a man that Miss Marple feels is innocent hang for the crime?

Characters:

- Mrs. Spenlow
- Mr. Spenlow
- Miss Plotitt
- Mis Hartnell
- Miss Marple
- Police Constable Palk
- Inspector Slack
- Colonel Melchett

° .

=== The Case of the Caretaker ===
Doctor Haydock, the resident GP in the small village of St. Mary Mead, hopes to cheer up Miss Marple as she recovers from the flu. He feels the best solution is to give her a problem that will challenge her mind rather than her body. He decides to ask for her assistance in solving a murder because what better way was there to keep her spirits up than to find a killer. Harry Lexton, the devilishly handsome black sheep son, has made good and returned to his childhood home with his new wife to start a life. However, the villagers cannot stop talking about Harry's past and at least one person cannot forgive him for tearing down the old house. When Harry's new wife dies unexpectedly, was it a witch's curse that did it or someone with darker plans?

Characters:

- Harry Lexton
- Louise Lexton
- Dr. Haydock
- Miss Marple
- Clarice Vane
- Mrs. Murgatroyd
- Bella Edge

=== The Third Floor Flat ===
A woman's body is found in a flat. She was discovered by a group of four resourceful young people who had been locked out of their flat. Luckily for them, Hercule Poirot is nearby to lend his assistance. Who murdered this poor woman? Is there more to this story then meets the eye? Can Poirot discover the truth before it is too late for someone else?

Characters:

- Patricia Garnett
- Jimmy Faulkener
- Donovan Bailey
- Mildred Hope
- Hercule Poirot
- Mrs. Ernestine Grant
- Inspector Rice

=== The Adventure of Johnnie Waverly ===
When a three-year-old child is kidnapped and held for ransom, Hercule Poirot must use his little gray cells to find the truth. Yet, when suspicion falls on the household, Poirot must face the difficult challenge of uncovering the location of the little boy.

Characters:

- Hercule Poirot
- Hastings
- Mrs. Waverly
- Mr. Waverly
- Miss Collins
- Inspector McNeil
- Johnnie Waverly
- Tredwell

=== Four-and-Twenty Blackbirds ===
Hercule Poirot is pulled into another mystery. While sitting down to dinner with an old friend, he notices the eating habits of one of the other patrons who the staff call "Old Father Time" as no one knows his name. He comes in every Tuesday and Thursday like clockwork, but one day he suddenly stops coming. Poirot believes he knows the truth behind the mystery, but could the truth be fatal?

Characters:

- Hercule Poirot
- Henry Bonnington
- Molly
- Old Father Time
- Dr. MacAndrew
- Henry Gascoigne
- George Lorrimer
- Mr. Hill

=== The Love Detectives ===
A messy love triangle ends in murder. Is the widowed wife and her lover really to blame? Mr. Satterthwaite teams up once again with the mysterious Mr. Harley Quin to discover why Sir James Dwight was murdered. Characters:

- Mr. Satterthwaite
- Harley Quin
- Colonel Melrose
- Sir James Dwighton
- Laura Dwighton
- Paul Delangua

== Publication history ==
- 1950, Dodd, Mead and Company, hardback, 250 pp.
- 1952, Dell Books, paperback, 224 pp. (Dell number 633 [mapback])
- 1960, Dell Books, paperback, as The Mousetrap and Other Stories (Dell number D354)
- 1984, Berkley Books, paperback, 212 pp. (Berkley number 06806-4)

=== First publication of stories in the US ===
- The Adventure of Johnny Waverly: June 1925 (Volume XLI, Number 2) issue of the Blue Book Magazine with an uncredited illustration.
- The Love Detectives: 30 October 1926 (Volume XIX, Number 3) issue of Flynn's Weekly under the title "At the Crossroads" with uncredited illustrations.
- The Third Floor Flat: 5 January 1929 (Volume CVI, Number 6) issue of Detective Story Magazine under the title "In the Third Floor Flat" with an uncredited illustration.
- Four and Twenty Blackbirds: 9 November 1940 (Volume 106, Number 19) issue of Collier's magazine with illustrations by Mario Cooper.
- Strange Jest: 2 November 1941 issue of This Week under the title "A Case of Buried Treasure."
- The Tape-Measure Murder: 16 November 1941 issue of This Week with an illustration by Arthur Sarnoff.
- The Case of the Caretaker: 5 July 1942 edition of the Chicago Sunday Tribune.
- The Case of the Perfect Maid: 13 September 1942 edition of the Chicago Sunday Tribune.
- Three Blind Mice: May 1948 (Volume 124, Number 5) issue of Cosmopolitan magazine with uncredited illustrations.

=== Appearances in UK collections ===
The four Miss Marple stories appeared in the 1979 collection Miss Marple's Final Cases and Two Other Stories. "The Third Floor Flat" and "The Adventure of Johnnie Waverly" appeared in the 1974 collection Poirot's Early Cases, while "Four and Twenty Blackbirds" appeared in the 1960 collection The Adventure of the Christmas Pudding. "The Love Detectives" appeared in the 1991 collection Problem at Pollensa Bay and Other Stories.
