= Andrew Peters (disambiguation) =

Andrew Peters (born 1980) is a Canadian ice hockey player.

Andrew Peters may also refer to:

- Andrew J. Peters (1872–1938), U.S. Representative from Massachusetts and Mayor of Boston
- Andi Peters (born 1970), British television presenter
- Andrew Peters, character in Destination Unknown (novel)
