= They Came to Baghdad =

1951 spy novel by Agatha Christie

- Dust-jacket illustration of the first UK edition
- Author: Agatha Christie
- Cover artist: No artwork
- Language: English
- Genre: Adventure novel / Political thriller, Spy fiction
- Publisher: Collins Crime Club
- Publication date: 5 March 1951
- Publication place: United Kingdom
- Media type: Print (hardback & paperback)
- Pages: 256 pp (first edition, hardback)
- Preceded by: Three Blind Mice and Other Stories
- Followed by: The Under Dog and Other Stories

They Came to Baghdad is a spy fiction and adventure novel by Agatha Christie, first published in the United Kingdom by the Collins Crime Club on 5 March 1951 and in the United States by Dodd, Mead and Company later in the same year. The UK edition retailed at eight shillings and sixpence (8/6) and the US edition at $2.50.

The book was inspired by Christie's own trips to Baghdad with her second husband, archaeologist Sir Max Mallowan, and is also one of few Christie novels belonging to the action and spy fiction genres, rather than to mysteries and whodunnits.

== Plot summary ==
A secret summit of superpowers is to be held in Baghdad, but it is no longer secret. A shadowy group (which is both anti-Communist and anti-Capitalist) is plotting to sabotage the event. Things get complicated when enthusiastic young "adventurer" Victoria Jones discovers a dying secret British agent – Henry "Fakir" Carmichael – in her hotel room. His last words – "Lucifer...Basrah...Lefarge" – propel her into investigation. "Lucifer" refers to the mastermind, Victoria's crush, Edward, who is behind the plot. "Basrah" is the city where Carmichael saw Edward and recognised him as an enemy. "Lefarge" turns out to actually be "Defarge" and is a reference to a Charles Dickens character; it is an allusion to the fact that the name of a vital witness has been stitched into a scarf. While Victoria is the central character, the real heroine is Anna Scheele, secretary/executive assistant to an American banker, who has discovered a great deal about finances of the shadowy group. She appears rather sparingly, with a few brief appearances in the early part of the story, then seems to vanish, to the chagrin of the evil organization who fear her financial knowledge and who want to liquidate her, and of her allies who wish to protect her. She reappears unexpectedly at the last moment.

== Reception ==
Julian MacLaren-Ross enthusiastically reviewed the novel in the 20 April 1951 issue of The Times Literary Supplement and said it was "more of a thriller than a detective story, though there are plenty of mysteries and two surprises reserved for the closing chapters; one of these is perhaps her best since the unmasking of the criminal in The Seven Dials Mystery." He went on to comment on that, "the easy expertise of the writing is once more a matter for admiration" and concluded that Christie's powers of invention "never fail her".

Maurice Richardson of The Observer (4 March 1951) wrote: "A bit light and frilly, in parts almost giggly, as Agatha Christie's thrillers are apt to be, but it has the usual creamy readability and a deeply planted fiend."

Robert Barnard: "Fairly preposterous example of thriller-type Christie, but livelier than some. Engaging heroine and unusually good minor characters – archeologists, hotelkeeper, etc. The plot concerns attempts to prevent The Big Three (Britain was one of them then) from coming together and making peace. Though the villains are not left-wing, they sound like her left-wing idealists of the 'thirties (wanting, as usual, to create a 'New Heaven and Earth' – highly dangerous!)"

== Adaptations ==
It was adapted as an episode of Westinghouse Studio One in 1952.

== Publication history ==
- 1951, Collins Crime Club (London), 5 March 1951, hardback, 256 pp
- 1951, Dodd Mead and Company (New York), 1951, hardback, 218 pp
- 1952, Pocket Books (New York), paperback (Pocket number 897), 215 pp
- 1957, Fontana Books (Imprint of HarperCollins), paperback, 192 pp
- 1965, Dell Books, paperback, 221 pp
- 1965, Ulverscroft Large-print Edition, hardcover, 256 pp
- 1969, Greenway edition of collected works (William Collins), hardcover, 287 pp ISBN 0-00-231814-8
- 1970, Greenway edition of collected works (Dodd Mead), hardcover, 287 pp
- 1974, Pan Books, paperback, 221 pp
- 1978, Ulverscroft Large-print Edition, hardcover, 410 pp ISBN 0-7089-0189-1

In the UK the novel was first serialised in the weekly magazine John Bull in eight abridged instalments from 13 January (Volume 89, Number 2324) to 3 March 1951 (Volume 89, Number 2331) with illustrations by "Showell". An abridged version of the novel was published in the 1 September 1951 issue of the Star Weekly Complete Novel, a Toronto newspaper supplement, with an uncredited cover illustration.
