= The Harmsworth Red Magazine =

UK fiction magazine

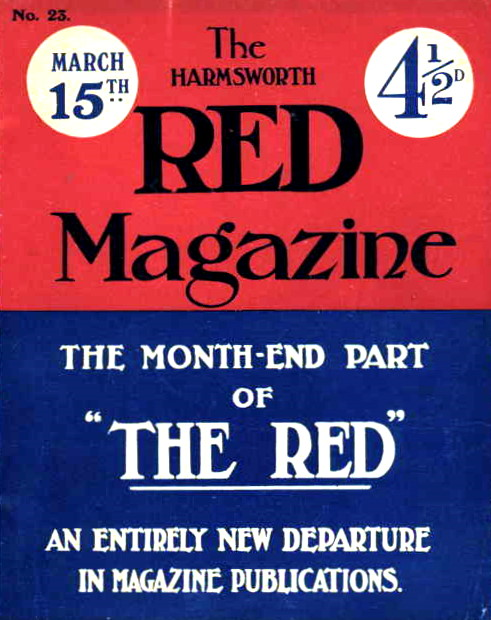
The Harmsworth Red Magazine, 15 March 1910.

The Harmsworth Red Magazine, also known as Harmsworth's Red Magazine or just The Red Magazine, was a UK fiction magazine published by Alfred Harmsworth's Amalgamated Press in 620 issues from June 1908 to September 1939. It was edited by John Stock. It had counterparts, The Yellow Magazine and The Green Magazine.

== Articles published ==
American writer Jack London's story "Goliah" was published in the magazine in 1908 before being published in the collection of his writings Revolution, and Other Essays in 1910.

One short story by Agatha Christie was in The Red Magazine; The Rajah's Emerald was first published in issue 420, 30 July 1926. The story was later published in two short story collections, one book in the US in 1971 and another book in the UK in 1934, The Listerdale Mystery.
