= The Rose and the Yew Tree =

1948 novel by Agatha Christie

- Dust-jacket illustration of the first UK edition
- Author: Mary Westmacott (pseudonym of Agatha Christie)
- Language: English
- Genre: Tragedy
- Publisher: William Heinemann Ltd
- Publication date: November 1948
- Publication place: United Kingdom
- Media type: Print (hardback & paperback)
- Pages: 224 pp (first edition, hardback)
- Preceded by: The Witness for the Prosecution and Other Stories
- Followed by: Crooked House

The Rose and the Yew Tree is a tragedy novel written by Agatha Christie and first published in the UK by William Heinemann Ltd in November 1948 and in the US by Farrar & Rinehart later in the same year. It is the fourth of six novels Christie published under the pen name Mary Westmacott, and the last of the Westmacott novels to be published before the true identity of their author was publicly revealed in 1949.

== The novel's title ==
The title of the novel is taken from Section V of Little Gidding from T. S. Eliot's Four Quartets. The full line, as quoted in the epigraph to the novel, is:

"The moment of the rose and the moment of the yew-tree
Are of equal duration".

== Plot summary ==
Hugh Norreys, crippled in a road accident, watches from his couch as John Gabriel runs for parliament in the small Cornish town of St. Loo. Hugh's invalid status seems to encourage his visitors to reveal their secrets and emotions. Hugh is mystified by Gabriel, an ugly little man who, nevertheless, is attractive to women. He is also intrigued by Isabella, a beautiful young woman from the castle down the road. So, Hugh and most of St. Loo are shocked when, shortly after Gabriel wins the election, he and Isabella run away together and Gabriel resigns as a member of parliament.

The novel explores love, caring for others, redemption, and a gothic tragedy of one woman and the men who love her.

== Literary significance and reception ==
The Times Literary Supplement's review of 6 November 1948, by Sir Julian Henry Hall concluded, "Miss Westmacott writes crisply and is always lucid. The pattern of the book is too vague at one point – the later stages of the hero's career – but much material has been skilfully compressed within little more than 200 pages."

== Publication history ==
- 1948 William Heinemann Ltd (London), November 1948, Hardback, 224 pp
- 1948 Farrar & Rinehart (New York), 1948, Hardback, 249 pp
- 1964 Dell Books, Paperback, 189 pp
- 1971 Arbor House, Hardback, 249 pp
- 1974 Fontana Books (Imprint of HarperCollins), Paperback, 192 pp
- 1978 Ulverscroft Large-print Edition, Hardcover, 358 pp ISBN 0-7089-0180-8

The novel was first serialised in the US in Good Housekeeping in two abridged instalments, carried in the December 1947 and January 1948 issues.
