= The Harlequin Tea Set =

1997 story collection by Agatha Christie

- Dust-jacket illustration of the first US edition
- Author: Agatha Christie
- Language: English
- Genre: Detective fiction short stories
- Publisher: G. P. Putnam's Sons
- Publication date: 14 April 1997
- Publication place: United Kingdom; United States
- Media type: Print (hardback & paperback)
- Pages: 281 pp
- ISBN: 0-399-14287-8
- OCLC: 35990407
- Dewey Decimal: 823/.912 21
- LC Class: PR6005.H66 H34 1997
- Preceded by: Problem at Pollensa Bay and Other Stories
- Followed by: While the Light Lasts and Other Stories

The Harlequin Tea Set is a short story collection written by Agatha Christie and first published in the US by G. P. Putnam's Sons on 14 April 1997. It contains nine short stories each of which involves a separate mystery. With the exception of "The Harlequin Tea Set", which was published in the collection Problem at Pollensa Bay, all stories were published in the UK in 1997 in the anthology While the Light Lasts and Other Stories.

The collection of nine stories include:

- "The Edge"
- "The Actress"
- "While the Light Lasts"
- "The House of Dreams"
- "The Lonely God"
- "Manx Gold"
- "Within a Wall"
- "The Mystery of the Spanish Chest" (a Hercule Poirot story)
- "The Harlequin Tea Set" (a Harley Quin story)

== Publication history ==
- 1997, Putnam, 14 April 1997, Hardcover, 281 pp; ISBN 0-399-14287-8
- 1998, Berkley Books, 1 December 1998, Paperback; ISBN 0-425-16515-9
