= Three Blind Mice (radio play and short story) =

1947 play by Agatha Christie

The billing from the Radio Times issue of 25–31 May 1947, illustrating the night's programmes on radio for Queen Mary including the performance of Three Blind Mice

Three Blind Mice is a half-hour radio play written by Agatha Christie, which was later adapted into a television film, a short story, and a stage production, The Mousetrap, which is the world's longest-running play.

== 1947 radio production ==
The original radio play was broadcast on the BBC Light Programme at 8.00pm on Friday 30 May 1947.

It was part of an evening of programmes in honour of the eightieth birthday of Queen Mary. The BBC had approached the Queen some months before and asked what programmes she would like to hear. Amongst a selection of music and variety, she requested something by Christie, a writer she admired. Christie agreed, asking that her fee of one hundred guineas be donated to the Southport Infirmary Children's Toy Fund.

The idea for the play came from a real-life tragedy, the Dennis O'Neill case of 1945, the death of a boy in foster care. Christie's official biography states that the name of the boy was Daniel O'Neill but contemporary newspaper reports state the name of the boy as Dennis O'Neill.

No recording of the original radio play exists and the script is not commercially available.

Director/Producer: Martyn C. Webster

Cast:
Barry Morse played Giles Davis
Belle Chrystall played Molly Davis
Gladys Young played Mrs Boyle
Richard Williams played Major Metcalf
Raf De La Torre played Mr Paravicini
Allan McClelland played Christopher Wren
Lewis Stringer played Detective-Sergeant Trotter
Lydia Sherwood played Mrs Lyon

Other parts were played by Marjorie Westbury, David Kossoff and Duncan McIntyre.

== 1947 television short ==
Later the radio play was developed for television and broadcast as a 30-minute BBC short on 21 October 1947. The television version was directed by Barrie Edgar and starred John Witty as Giles Davis.

== 1948 short story ==
At some point soon after transmission of the radio play, the suggestion was made to Christie that she turn it into a short story. This was published in the US in Cosmopolitan magazine in May 1948 and then in the 1950 US collection Three Blind Mice and Other Stories. The story was published in a magazine in the UK in 1948 but has not been republished since.

== 1950 television film ==
The story was adapted as the ninth episode of the CBS anthology series Sure as Fate, broadcast on 31 October 1950.

== 1952 stage play ==
Christie saw the potential of expanding the half-hour radio play into a full theatre play and in 1952 The Mousetrap, the play that has had the longest initial run of any play in the world, first came to the stage. As another play had run on the stage just prior to the Second World War also with the title Three Blind Mice, Christie had to change the name. It was her son-in-law, Anthony Hicks, who suggested The Mousetrap, which is taken from Act III, Scene II of Shakespeare's Hamlet. Allan McClelland, in the role of Christopher Wren, was the only actor to make the transition from the radio production to the stage play.

The text of the play was published in 1954 by Samuel French as 'French's Acting Edition No 153' and also in the HarperCollins 1993 collection The Mousetrap and Other Plays (ISBN 0-00-224344-X).

== 1956 Brazilian television adaptation ==
The story, under its Portuguese language title of Três Ratinhos Cegos, was adapted for Brazilian television and broadcast on 21 January 1956.
