= Miss Marple's Final Cases and Two Other Stories =

1979 Agatha Christie short story collection

- Dust-jacket illustration of the first UK edition
- Author: Agatha Christie
- Original title: Miss Marple's 6 Final Cases and 2 Other Stories
- Language: English
- Genre: Detective fiction Short stories
- Publisher: Collins Crime Club
- Publication date: 17 October 1979
- Publication place: United Kingdom
- Media type: Print (hardback & paperback)
- Pages: 140 (first edition, hardback)
- ISBN: 0-00-231596-3
- OCLC: 52457481
- Preceded by: An Autobiography
- Followed by: Problem at Pollensa Bay

Miss Marple's Final Cases and Two Other Stories is a short story collection written by Agatha Christie and first published posthumously in the UK by Collins Crime Club on 17 October 1979 retailing at £4.50. It was the last Christie book to be published under the Collins Crime Club imprint although HarperCollins continue to be the writer's UK publishers.

The book contains eight short stories, six featuring Miss Marple and two other stories, and did not originally appear in the United States because most of the stories had been published earlier in the US in magazines.

In 2010, an audio book and the Kindle edition were released, which included six stories from the book, plus "Greenshaw's Folly".

== List of stories ==
- "Sanctuary"
- "Strange Jest"
- "Tape-Measure Murder"
- "The Case of the Caretaker"
- "The Case of the Perfect Maid"
- "Miss Marple Tells a Story"
- "The Dressmaker's Doll"
- "In a Glass Darkly"

== Literary significance and reception ==
Robert Barnard: "Posthumous collection, containing several good Marple cases previously only available in the States. Also two supernatural stories, which Christie did not have the stylistic resources to bring off successfully."

== Publication history ==
- 1978, Ulverscroft Large-print Edition, Hardcover, ISBN 0-7089-2346-1
- 1979, Collins Crime Club (London), October 1979, Hardcover, 140 pp ISBN 0-00-231596-3
- 1980, Fontana Books (Imprint of HarperCollins), Paperback
- 2005, HarperCollins audio edition (CD) ISBN 0007199252 / 9780007199259, UK edition, most recent of three audio editions
- 2006, HarperCollins Hardcover ISBN 0007208618 / 9780007208616 UK edition

Five paperback editions were issued from November 1980 to the most recent in April 2010 by Ulverscroft Large Print Books Ltd, ISBN 1444802348 / 9781444802344.

This collection was issued for Kindle by HarperCollins in October 2010, ISBN B0046RE5FY and in July 2012, ISBN B008I5CNPE. The latest audio edition includes an additional short story, originally published in The Adventure of the Christmas Pudding collection, "Greenshaw's Folly".

=== First publication of stories ===
The first magazine publication of each of the stories is as follows:

- "Strange Jest": First published in This Week magazine in the US on 2 November 1941 and then in issue 643 of the Strand Magazine in July 1944 under the title of "The Case of the Buried Treasure". (This was the final short story Christie wrote for the Strand.)
- "Tape-Measure Murder": First published in This Week magazine in the US on 16 November 1941 and then in issue 614 of the Strand Magazine in February 1942 under the title of "The Case of the Retired Jeweller".
- "The Case of the Caretaker": First published in issue 613 of the Strand Magazine in January 1942.
- "The Case of the Perfect Maid": First published in issue 616 of the Strand Magazine in April 1942 under the shortened title of "The Perfect Maid".
- "Sanctuary": First published in the October 1954 issue of Woman's Journal. This story was specially written by Christie for the Westminster Abbey restoration appeal fund of that year. The story was sold to the highest bidder with the funds going to the appeal. The Magazine did not state the sum that they paid but noted that it was "considerable".
- "The Dressmaker's Doll": First published in the December 1958 issue of Woman's Journal.
- "Miss Marple Tells a Story" was not written for magazine publication initially but was a special commission from the BBC for a series called Short Story as announced in The Times on 27 March 1934. It is further unusual in that the story was read out by Christie herself, in the manner of her previous broadcasts of Behind the Screen (1930) and The Scoop (1931). The twenty-minute broadcast took place on Friday, 11 May 1934 at 9.20pm on the National Programme. The text was first published in Volume 3, Issue 64 of the weekly UK magazine Home Journal on 25 May 1935 under the title "Behind Closed Doors" and with an illustration by Michael Bernard.
- The Daily Mirror of 6 April 1934 stated that "In a Glass Darkly" was being read out by Christie on BBC Radio that night as part of the Short Story series. However, the programme billings on the same page stated the broadcast was by Dorothy L. Sayers with a story titled "Dilemma" and the Radio Times also states that this was the broadcast made. The text of Christie's story was first published in the December 1934 issue of the monthly Woman's Journal.

== Adaptations ==
The stories "The Tape-Measure Murder", "The Case of the Perfect Maid" and "Sanctuary" were adapted as episodes for the BBC Radio 4 radio drama series Miss Marple's Final Cases, starring June Whitfield as Miss Marple and dramatised by Joy Wilkinson. Additionally, the plot of "The Case of the Caretaker" is referenced to by the character Raymond West, Miss Marple's nephew, in the episode "The Case of the Perfect Maid".

The stories "Strange Jest", "The Case of the Perfect Maid" and "The Tape-Measure Murder" were adapted as episodes of the Japanese anime television series Agatha Christie's Great Detectives Poirot and Marple in 2004.
