= While the Light Lasts and Other Stories =

Short story collection by Agatha Christie (1997)

- Dust-jacket illustration of the first UK edition
- Author: Agatha Christie
- Cover artist: Geoffrey Appleton
- Language: English
- Genre: Crime novel
- Publisher: HarperCollins
- Publication date: 4 August 1997
- Publication place: United Kingdom
- Media type: Print (hardback & paperback)
- Pages: 182 pp (first edition, hardcover)
- ISBN: 0-00-232643-4
- OCLC: 37694626
- Dewey Decimal: 823/.912 21
- LC Class: PR6005.H66 W47 1997
- Preceded by: The Harlequin Tea Set

While the Light Lasts and Other Stories is a short story collection by Agatha Christie first published in the UK on 4 August 1997 by HarperCollins. It contains nine short stories.

== Contents ==
The collection comprises the following stories:

- "The House of Dreams"
- "The Actress"
- "The Edge"
- "Christmas Adventure" (featuring Hercule Poirot)
- "The Lonely God"
- "Manx Gold"
- "Within a Wall"
- "The Mystery of the Baghdad Chest" (featuring Hercule Poirot)
- "While the Light Lasts"

In addition, it contains a preface and afterwords to every story by Christie scholar Tony Medawar.

== Publication history ==
- 1997, HarperCollins, 4 August 1997, Hardcover, 182pp; ISBN 0-00-232643-4
- 1998, HarperCollins, 20 July 1998, Paperback, 224pp; ISBN 0-00-651018-3

=== First publication of stories ===
Details of the first UK publication of the stories published in While the Light Lasts are as follows:

- The House of Dreams: First published in issue 74 of the Sovereign Magazine in January 1926, illustrated by Stanley Lloyd.
- The Actress: First published in issue 218 of The Novel Magazine in May 1923 under the title of A Trap for the Unwary, with an illustration by Emile Verpilleux. Prior to the publication of this volume, the story (with its 1923 illustration) was reprinted in the 1990 paperback Agatha Christie – Official Centenary Celebration by Belgrave Publishing (ISBN 0-00-637675-4). The Actress is Christie's original title for this story.
- The Edge: First published, unillustrated, in issue 374 of Pearson's Magazine in February 1927.
- Christmas Adventure: First published, unillustrated, in issue 1611 of The Sketch Magazine on 11 December 1923. The story was later expanded into novella form and was printed as the title story in the 1960 UK collection The Adventure of the Christmas Pudding.
- The Lonely God: First published in issue 333 of the Royal Magazine in July 1926, with illustrations by Henry Coller. Christie's original title for this story was The Little Lonely God.
- Manx Gold was one of the most unusual commissions undertaken by Christie in her career. As described in detail in an editorial note, the idea of a treasure hunting story was prompted by a wish on the part of Manx politicians to promote tourism to the Isle of Man. Christie wrote a short story which was serialised in the Daily Dispatch in five instalments on 23, 24, 26, 27 and 28 May 1930. The story gave the clues to the location of four snuffboxes hidden on the island, each of which contained a voucher for £100 – a considerable sum in 1930. Island residents were barred from taking part. To further promote the hunt, the story was then published in a promotional booklet entitled June in Douglas which was distributed at guesthouses and other tourist spots. Although a quarter of a million copies of this booklet were printed, only one is known to have survived.
- Within a Wall: First published in issue 324 of the Royal Magazine in October 1925 with illustrations by Albert Bailey.
- The Mystery of the Baghdad Chest: First published in issue 493 of the Strand Magazine in January 1932. The story was later expanded into novella form and was printed as The Mystery of the Spanish Chest in the 1960 UK collection The Adventure of the Christmas Pudding.
- "While the Light Lasts": First published in issue 229 of The Novel Magazine in April 1924, with two illustrations by Howard K. Elcock. The plot of this short story is similar to that of her novel Giant's Bread.
