= The Scoop and Behind the Screen =

Collaborative detective serials

- Dust-jacket illustration of the first UK edition
- Author: Hugh Walpole; Agatha Christie; Dorothy L. Sayers; Anthony Berkeley; E.C. Bentley; Ronald Knox; Freeman Wills Crofts; Clemence Dane
- Language: English
- Genre: Crime novel
- Publisher: Victor Gollancz Ltd
- Publication date: 1983
- Publication place: United Kingdom
- Media type: Print (Hardback)
- Pages: 184 pp (first edition, hardback)
- ISBN: 0-575-03225-1
- OCLC: 9462119

The Scoop and Behind the Screen are both collaborative detective serials written by members of the Detection Club which were broadcast weekly by their authors on the BBC National Programme in 1930 and 1931 with the scripts then being published in The Listener within a week after broadcast. The two serials were first published in book form in the UK by Victor Gollancz Ltd in 1983 and in the US by Harper & Row in 1984. The UK edition retailed at £6.95.

Julian Symons, then President of the club (1983), explains in his introduction: "...The present volume... was written to provide funds so that club premises might be acquired. Other books with the same purpose, also the product of several hands, were The Floating Admiral (1931), ... Ask a Policeman (1933), ... and ... Verdict of Thirteen. ..."

== Behind the Screen ==
The episodes, contributors, transmission and magazine publication details of this serial are as follows (all episodes were transmitted from 9:25 pm to 9:40 pm):

The billing from the Radio Times issue of June 15–21, 1930, illustrating Agatha Christie's broadcast of her chapter of Behind The Screen.

- (1): (Episode unnamed), written and broadcast by Hugh Walpole. Transmitted on Saturday 14 June 1930. First published in issue 75 of The Listener on 18 June 1930.
- (2): Something is Missing, written and broadcast by Agatha Christie. Transmitted on Saturday 21 June 1930. First published in issue 76 of The Listener on 25 June 1930.
- (3): Man at the Gate, written and broadcast by Dorothy L. Sayers. Transmitted on Saturday 28 June 1930. First published in issue 77 of The Listener on 2 July 1930.
- (4): I Killed Mr Dudden, written and broadcast by Anthony Berkeley. Transmitted on Saturday 5 July 1930. First published in issue 78 of The Listener on 9 July 1930.
- (5): Amy Intervenes, written and broadcast by E.C. Bentley. Transmitted on Saturday 12 July 1930. First published in issue 79 of The Listener on 16 July 1930.
- (6): How Dudden Died, written and broadcast by Ronald Knox. Transmitted on Saturday 19 July 1930. First published in issue 80 of The Listener on 23 July 1930.

In The Listener (and subsequently in the book version), four of the episodes were untitled, the exceptions being the fourth and sixth, which were given the titles In the Aspidistra and Mr Parsons on the Case respectively.

== The Scoop ==
As announced in The Guardian on 2 December 1930, Behind the Screen proved popular enough for the BBC to commission a second serial, this time in twelve instalments.

The episodes, contributors, transmission and magazine publication details of this serial are as follows (all episodes were transmitted from 9:25 pm to 9:40 pm except for episode 7):

- (1): (Episode unnamed), written and broadcast by Dorothy L. Sayers. Transmitted on Saturday 10 January 1931. First published in issue 105 of The Listener on 14 January 1931.

The billing from the Radio Times issue of 11–17 January 1931, illustrating Agatha Christie's broadcast of her second chapter of The Scoop.

- (2): (Episode unnamed), written and broadcast by Agatha Christie. Transmitted on Saturday 17 January 1931. First published in issue 106 of The Listener on 21 January 1931.
- (3): Fisher's Alibi, written and broadcast by E.C. Bentley. Transmitted on Saturday 24 January 1931. First published in issue 107 of The Listener on 28 January 1931.
- (4): The Strange Behaviour of Mr. Potts, written and broadcast by Agatha Christie. Transmitted on Saturday 31 January 1931. First published in issue 108 of The Listener on 4 February 1931 under the alternative title of The Weapon.
- (5): Tracing Tracey, written and broadcast by Anthony Berkeley. Transmitted on Saturday 14 February 1931. First published in issue 110 of The Listener on 18 February 1931.
- (6): Scotland Yard on the Job, written and broadcast by Freeman Wills Crofts. Transmitted on Saturday 21 February 1931. First published in issue 111 of The Listener on 25 February 1931.
- (7): Beryl in Broad Street, written and broadcast by Clemence Dane. Transmitted on Saturday 28 February 1931 from 8:30 pm to 8:55 pm. First published in issue 112 of The Listener on 4 March 1931.
- (8): The Sad Truth About Potts, written and broadcast by E.C. Bentley. Transmitted on Saturday 7 March 1931. First published in issue 113 of The Listener on 11 March 1931.
- (9): Bond Street and Broad Street, written and broadcast by Anthony Berkeley. Transmitted on Saturday 14 March 1931. First published in issue 114 of The Listener on 18 March 1931 under the slightly different title of Bond Street or Broad Street?.
- (10): Beryl Takes the Consequences, written and broadcast by Clemence Dane. Transmitted on Saturday 21 March 1931. First published in issue 115 of The Listener on 25 March 1931.
- (11): Inspector Smart gets a Nasty Jar, written and broadcast by Freeman Wills Crofts. Transmitted on Saturday 28 March 1931. First published in issue 116 of The Listener on 1 April 1931 under the slightly different title of Inspector Smart's Nasty Jar.
- (12): The Final Scoop, written and broadcast by Dorothy L. Sayers. Transmitted on Saturday 4 April 1931. First published in issue 117 of The Listener on 8 April 1931.

In The Listener the first two instalments were entitled Over the Wire and At the Inquest. The book version of the serial (1983) replicates these chapter titles.

== Publication history ==
- 1983, Victor Gollancz (London), 1983, Hardback, 184 pp
- 1984, Methuen (London), 1984, Hardback, 182 pp
- 1984, Harper and Row (New York), 1984, 208 pp
