= Star Over Bethlehem =

1965 book of poetry and short stories by Agatha Christie

- Dust-jacket illustration of the first UK edition
- Author: Agatha Christie
- Illustrator: Elsie Wrigley
- Cover artist: Elsie Wrigley
- Language: English
- Genre: Poetry and short story collection
- Publisher: Collins
- Publication date: 1 November 1965
- Publication place: United Kingdom
- Media type: Print (hardback)
- Pages: 80 (first edition, hardback)
- Preceded by: A Caribbean Mystery
- Followed by: At Bertram's Hotel

Star Over Bethlehem is an illustrated book of poetry and short stories on a religious theme by crime writer Agatha Christie. It was published under the name "Agatha Christie Mallowan" (whose only other book to be published under this by-line was the 1946 short autobiography Come, Tell Me How You Live). It was published in the UK by Collins on 1 November 1965 in an edition priced at thirteen shillings and sixpence (13/6) and in the US by Dodd, Mead and Company in an edition retailing at $4.95.

The volume contains five poems and six short stories, all on the theme of Christianity. Some of the poems can be taken as comments or epilogues on the short stories (e.g. Gold, Frankincense and Myrrh refers to the gifts in the stable which The Naughty Donkey in the preceding story attempts to eat). Although relatively unknown, this work, when referred to at all, is often stated as being for children; however the stories it contains are firmly aimed at an adult audience and with adult themes, especially for 1965. For instance, in the story The Water Bus, Mrs Hargreaves's cleaner tries to offload her woes to her employer, the main one of which is that her daughter is dying in hospital after an illegal abortion went wrong.

Little is known of the reasons for the writing of the contents of this book, however Christie is known to have retained strong religious beliefs throughout her life. She is also said to have been pleased with Collins' plans for the publication and its illustrations by Elsie Wrigley and pleased at the reception of the book and, for once, requests for it to be autographed.

== Poems ==
- A Greeting
- A Wreath for Christmas
- Gold, Frankincense and Myrrh
- Jenny by the Sky
- The Saints of God

== Short stories ==
The binding of the UK edition of Star over Bethlehem with an illustration by Elsie Wrigley

=== Star Over Bethlehem ===
Mary is alone in the stable in Bethlehem with the baby Jesus when she receives a visitation from an angel. He tells the virgin that she has been permitted a glimpse of the future and shows Jesus alone and afraid in the Garden of Gethsemane as He prays before his arrest, then a vision of Jesus carrying His cross on the way to His crucifixion, and then finally on the cross as He is declared by the High Priest as a blasphemer. The angel offers Mary the choice of giving the baby back to God to avoid these agonies of the future and tells her that she should regard the choice as hers alone with no compunction from God himself. Mary suddenly remembers the smile on her son's face as He looked on His sleeping disciples in Gethsemane and a similar look on the face of one of the criminals also on a cross at Golgotha. She refuses the offer that the angel makes to her. He vanishes as Joseph comes into the stable. The angel is then revealed to be Satan in disguised form who vows to come back one day and tempt Jesus himself. As he flashes through the sky towards hell, his passage is mistaken for a star by the Three Wise Men.

=== The Naughty Donkey ===
A boastful donkey refuses to behave or obey the orders of its masters. Having a mind of its own, it leaves whatever master it has and manages to wander through Judea. Sheltering in the stable in Bethlehem, it witnesses the birth of Jesus, the shepherds, the three wise men and the visitation of an angel. Inspecting the presents left by the three wise men for something to eat, the baby Jesus touches the donkey's ear and its character is transformed. It becomes the donkey that takes Joseph, Mary and Jesus into Egypt, once knowing by instinct when Herod's soldiers are near and hiding them.

=== The Water Bus ===
Mrs Hargreaves, a middle-aged widow, lives alone in London. Her two grown-up children are married and live far away. She is comfortable on her own but dislikes people, their cares and complaints. She is a generous giver to charity but does not want to be involved herself and feels isolated from everyone around her to the point where even a shopping expedition becomes an ordeal. Craving isolation she takes a water bus to Greenwich and on the journey touches the woven cloak-like coat of an Arabic-looking man sat in the bow of the boat. She undergoes something of a religious conversion, suddenly seeing other people's problems that irritated her in a new light. She feels she knows who the man was. On the water bus, the man has disappeared. The Captain tells the mate who collected the tickets that he must have just missed him disembarking as he couldn't walk on water...

=== In the Cool of the Evening ===
Major Rodney Grierson and his wife, Janet, are at Evensong. She is praying desperately for a miracle cure for their son, Alan, who is thirteen and mildly retarded. Arriving home after the service, Alan greets them with a strange creature he has found in the garden. Part frog, it has wings and feathers and is a mutation caused by a leak some time ago from a local research station on the downs. Alan tells them he has named the creature a "Raphion" and he has named it and other strange creatures with the help of his "friend" who is down the bottom of the garden. Alan wants to know where they have been and what a "church" is. His parents tell him it is God's house. After supper, Alan asks permission to go back down to the bottom of the garden and help his "friend" continue to name the new species. His parents say yes and Alan meets up with his "friend" again. As they continue to name the new animals, Alan asks Him if He is God. He says yes and when asked if he lives in a church, he replies, "I live in many places… But sometimes, in the cool of the evening, I walk in a garden – with a friend and talk about the New World…”

=== Promotion in the Highest ===
It is New Year's Eve in the year 2000. In the dead of night, a drunken man, Jacob Narracott, sees a strange procession making its way down the hill from the church. There are fourteen people, among them a woman carrying a wheel (Saint Catherine) and a man carrying a gridiron (St Lawrence). Narracott tells the local police constable of his sighting, feeling that he has seen them somewhere before...

The fourteen are saints who walk the earth again on their way back to heaven. They stand before the recording angel and tell him of their guilt that they attained eternal life when they feel they did not do enough to deserve such a reward. The recording angel is dismissive but the archangel Gabriel intercedes as, every millennium, judgements given can be appealed. The saints are given promotion in the highest and return to earth where they start to do good deeds among needy people. Back in the church, the vicar is told that his 15th century altar screen is beyond repair and that the images of the saints on it have gone for good and cannot be restored...

=== The Island ===
On an isolated island, Mary lives with a man who is known to the other islanders as a holy man. This man works at his scriptures desperate for a vision to enable him to complete them. Two men arrive on the island as they have heard that the Queen of Heaven lives there. Sent by the islanders to the croft where Mary and the man live, they are told no such person lives on the island and they should stop their search for false gods. The two men leave. Soon after, another boat arrives on the island with Jesus in the company of Simon and Andrew. Jesus takes Mary away with him, walking on water to reach the boat. John remains on the island and is reinspired to complete his work..."It was the Lord's Day, and at once he knew that this was to be the great day of his life!"

(Although not stated implicitly in the story, the island is undoubtedly Patmos where John the Evangelist or John of Patmos wrote the Book of Revelation. John the Evangelist supposedly took care of Mary in her old age but in this story, the positions are reversed, leaving John to complete the final book of the Bible.)

== Publication history ==
- 1965, Collins Crime Club (London), 1 November 1965, Hardback, 80 pp
- 1965, Dodd Mead and Company (New York), 1965, Hardback, 80 pp
- 1991, Berkley Books, 1991, Paperback ISBN 0-425-13229-3
- 1992, Fount Books, October 1992, Paperback ISBN 0-00-627664-4
- 1996, Bantam Books, 1996, Paperback, ISBN 0-553-35104-4

The title story was first published in the monthly Woman's Journal issue for December 1946
