= Problem at Pollensa Bay and Other Stories =

Agatha Christie collection

- Dust-jacket illustration of the first UK edition
- Author: Agatha Christie
- Cover artist: Andy Miles
- Language: English
- Genre: Crime novel
- Publisher: HarperCollins
- Publication date: November 1991
- Publication place: United Kingdom
- Media type: Print (hardback & paperback)
- Pages: 232 pp (first edition, hardcover)
- ISBN: 0-00-223922-1
- OCLC: 26260305
- Preceded by: Miss Marple's Final Cases
- Followed by: The Harlequin Tea Set

Problem at Pollensa Bay and Other Stories is a short story collection by the English writer Agatha Christie, published in the United Kingdom only in November 1991 by HarperCollins. It was not published in the Umited States, but all the stories contained within it had previously been published in American volumes. The collection retailed at £13.99. It contains two stories with Hercule Poirot, two with Parker Pyne, two with Harley Quin and two stories which do not belong to the detective fiction genre.

== Stories ==
- Problem at Pollensa Bay - Whilst on holiday in Mallorca, Mr Parker Pyne is enlisted by a mother who is unhappy at her son's choice of fiancée.
- The Second Gong - Hercule Poirot is on the scene when a man apparently commits suicide in a locked room.
- Yellow Iris - Poirot receives a telephone call begging him to come to a nightclub, where he finds a table of guests who are all connected to an unsolved murder.
- The Harlequin Tea Set
- The Regatta Mystery - During a yacht party, a child suggests she knows how to steal an immensely valuable diamond. Parker Pyne is consulted.
- Next to a Dog - A story about an impoverished war-widow and her beloved dog.
- The Love Detectives - Mr Satterthwaite and Mr Quin assist the Chief Constable when a man is found murdered in his study.
- Magnolia Blossom - On the evening a married woman absconds with her lover, she discovers her husband is facing sudden financial ruin.

== Publication history ==
- 1991, HarperCollins, November 1991, Hardcover, 232 pp ISBN 0-00-223922-1
- 1992, Fontana Books (Imprint of HarperCollins), Paperback ISBN 0-00-647242-7

=== First publication of stories ===
The first UK magazine publication of all the stories has not been fully documented. The known listing is as follows:

- Magnolia Blossom: First published in issue 329 of the Royal Magazine in March 1926. The story first appeared in book form in the UK in the 1982 collection The Agatha Christie Hour (ISBN 0-00-231-3316) to tie in with a dramatisation of the story in the television series of the same name.
- The Love Detectives: First published in issue 236 of The Story-Teller magazine in December 1926 under the title of At the Crossroads. This was the first of a series of six stories in consecutive issues of the magazine titled The Magic of Mr. Quin. The remaining five were later published in book form in The Mysterious Mr. Quin in 1930. The plot has similarities to 1930 Miss Marple novel The Murder at the Vicarage
- Next to a Dog: First published in issue 295 of the Grand Magazine in September 1929.
- The Second Gong: First published in issue 499 of the Strand Magazine in July 1932. This story with Hercule Poirot was the basis of the novella Dead Man's Mirror in 1935.
- Problem at Pollensa Bay: First published in issue 539 of the Strand Magazine in November 1935. The story was illustrated by Jack M. Faulks. The detective is Parker Pyne.
- The Regatta Mystery: First published in issue 546 of the Strand Magazine in June 1936 under the title Poirot and the Regatta Mystery. The story was illustrated by Jack M. Faulks. The story was later rewritten by Christie to change the detective from Hercule Poirot to Parker Pyne before its first book publication in the US in The Regatta Mystery and Other Stories in 1939. The publication in the Strand Magazine remained the only publication of the original version of the story in the UK until 2008, when it was included in the omnibus volume "Hercule Poirot: the Complete Short Stories" (ISBN 978-0006513773).
- Yellow Iris: First published in issue 559 of the Strand Magazine in July 1937. This story with Hercule Poirot was the basis of the novel Sparkling Cyanide, in which Poirot was replaced by Colonel Race and the plot was heavily altered.

No magazine publication of The Harlequin Tea Set has yet been traced; the story was first published in book form in the UK in Winter's Crimes #3 in 1971 by MacMillan (ISBN 0-333-12871-0).
