= Edgar Allan Poe Award for Best Critical/Biographical Work =

American literary award

The Edgar Allan Poe Award for Best Critical/Biographical Work, established in 1977, is a literary award presented as part of the Edgar Awards for a nonfiction critical or biographical hardcover, paperback, or electronic book.

To be eligible, biographical books should be "biographies of mystery writers or other notable practitioners of the genre, not to criminals." Criminal biographies are eligible for the Edgar Allan Poe Award for Best Fact Crime.

The Edgar Allan Poe Award for Best Critical/Biographical Work winners are listed below.

== Recipients ==
=== 2000s ===
2000s Best Critical/Biographical Work winners
Year	Author	Title	Result	Ref.
2008	Jon Lellenberg, Daniel Stashower, and Charles Foley	Arthur Conan Doyle: A Life in Letters	Winner	
2009	Dr. Harry Lee Poe	Edgar Allan Poe: An Illustrated Companion to his Tell-Tale Stories	Winner	

=== 2010s ===
2010s Best Critical/Biographical Work winners
Year	Author	Title	Result	Ref.
2010	Otto Penzler	The Lineup: The World's Greatest Crime Writers Tell the Inside Story of Their Greatest Detectives	Winner	
2011	Yunte Huang	Charlie Chan: The Untold Story of the Honorable Detective and His Rendezvous with American History	Winner	
2011	Rafael Alvarez	The Wire: Truth Be Told	Shortlist	
2011	John Curran	Agatha Christie’s Secret Notebooks: 50 Years of Mysteries in the Making	Shortlist	
2011	Stephen Doyle and David A. Crowder	Sherlock Holmes for Dummies	Shortlist	
2011	David Morrell and Hank Wagner (editors)	Thrillers: 100 Must Reads	Shortlist	
2012	Michael Dirda	On Conan Doyle; or, The Whole Art of Storytelling	Winner	
2012	Dan Burstein, Arne de Keijzer, and John-Henri Holmberg	The Tattooed Girl: The Enigma of Stieg Larsson and the Secrets Behind the Most Compelling Thrillers of our Time	Shortlist	
2012	John Curran	Agatha Christie: Murder in the Making	Shortlist	
2012	Philippa Gates	Detecting Women: Gender and the Hollywood Detective Film	Shortlist	
2012	Walter Raubicheck and Walter Srebnick	Scripting Hitchcock: Psycho, The Birds and Marnie	Shortlist	
2013	James O'Brien	The Scientific Sherlock Holmes: Cracking the Case with Science and Forensics	Winner	
2013	John Paul Athanasourelis	Raymond Chandler’s Philip Marlowe: The Hard-Boiled Detective Transformed	Shortlist	
2013	John Connolly (editor)	Books To Die For: The World’s Greatest Mystery Writers on the World’s Greatest Mystery Novels	Shortlist	
2013	Otto Penzler (editor)	In Pursuit of Spenser: Mystery Writers on Robert B. Parker and the Creation of an American Hero	Shortlist	
2014	Erik Dussere	America Is Elsewhere: The Noir Tradition in the Age of Consumer Culture	Winner	
2014	Bill Alder	Maigret, Simenon and France: Social Dimensions of the Novels and Stories	Shortlist	
2014	Justin Gifford	Pimping Fictions: African American Crime Literature and the Untold Story of Black Pulp Publishing	Shortlist	
2014	Andrew Lycett	Ian Fleming	Shortlist	
2014	Melissa Schaub	Middlebrow Feminism in Classic British Detective Fiction	Shortlist	
2015	J. W. Ocker	Poe-Land: The Hallowed Haunts of Edgar Allan Poe	Winner	
2015	Charles Brownson	The Figure of the Detective: A Literary History and Analysis	Shortlist	
2015	Jim Mancall	James Ellroy: A Companion to the Mystery Fiction	Shortlist	
2015	Robert Miklitsch	Kiss the Blood Off My Hands: Classic Film Noir	Shortlist	
2015	Francis M. Nevins	Judges & Justice & Lawyers & Law: Exploring the Legal Dimensions of Fiction and Film	Shortlist	
2016	Martin Edwards	The Golden Age of Murder	Winner	
2016	Frederick Forsyth	The Outsider: My Life in Intrigue	Shortlist	
2016	Suzanne Marrs and Tom Nolan	Meanwhile There Are Letters: The Correspondence of Eudora Welty and Ross Macdonald	Shortlist	
2016	Matthew Parker	Goldeneye: Where Bond Was Born: Ian Fleming’s Jamaica	Shortlist	
2016	Nathan Ward	The Lost Detective: Becoming Dashiell Hammett	Shortlist	
2017	Ruth Franklin	Shirley Jackson: A Rather Haunted Life	Winner	
2017	Peter Ackroyd	Alfred Hitchcock: A Brief Life	Shortlist	
2017	Mitzi M. Brunsdale	Encyclopedia of Nordic Crime: Works and Authors of Denmark, Finland, Iceland, Norway and Sweden Since 1967	Shortlist	
2017	David J. Skal	Something in the Blood: The Untold Story of Bram Stoker, the Man Who Wrote Dracula	Shortlist	
2018	Lawrence P. Jackson	Chester B. Himes: A Biography	Winner	
2018	Mattias Bostrom	From Holmes to Sherlock: The Story of the Men and Women who Created an Icon	Shortlist	
2018	Tatiana de Rosnay	Manderley Forever: A Biography of Daphne du Maurier	Shortlist	
2018	Curtis Evans	Murder in the Closet: Essays on Queer Clues in Crime Fiction Before Stonewall	Shortlist	
2018	Michael Sims	Arthur and Sherlock: Conan Doyle and the Creation of Holmes	Shortlist	
2019	Leslie S. Klinger	Classic American Crime Fiction of the 1920s	Winner	
2019	Laird R. Blackwell	The Metaphysical Mysteries of G.K. Chesterton: A Critical Study of the Father Brown Stories and Other Detective Fiction	Shortlist	
2019	Alice Bolin	Dead Girls: Essays on Surviving an American Obsession	Shortlist	
2019	Yasuhiro Takeuchi	Mark X: Who Killed Huck Finn’s Father?	Shortlist	
2019	Laura Thompson	Agatha Christie: A Mysterious Life	Shortlist	

=== 2020s ===
2020s Best Critical/Biographical Work winners and shortlists
Year	Author	Title	Result	Ref.
2020	John Billheimer	Hitchcock and the Censors	Winner	
2020	Ursula Buchan	Beyond the Thirty-Nine Steps: A Life of John Buchan	Shortlist	
2020	John Curran	The Hooded Gunman: An Illustrated History of Collins Crime Club	Shortlist	
2020	Anne McKendry	Medieval Crime Fiction: A Critical Overview	Shortlist	
2020	Mo Moulton	The Mutual Admiration Society: How Dorothy L. Sayers and her Oxford Circle Remade the World for Women	Shortlist	
2021	Christina Lane	Phantom Lady: Hollywood Producer Joan Harrison, the Forgotten Woman Behind Hitchcock	Winner	
2021	Martin Edwards	Howdunit: A Masterclass in Crime Writing by Members of the Detection Club	Shortlist	
2021	Erin E. MacDonald	Ian Rankin: A Companion to the Mystery & Fiction	Shortlist	
2021	Elizabeth Mannion and Brian Cliff	Guilt Rules All: Irish Mystery, Detective, and Crime Fiction	Shortlist	
2021	Jacqueline Winspear	This Time Next Year We’ll be Laughing	Shortlist	
2022	Edward White	The Twelve Lives of Alfred Hitchcock: An Anatomy of the Master of Suspense	Winner	
2022	Mark Aldridge	Agatha Christie’s Poirot: The Greatest Detective in the World	Shortlist	
2022	Richard Greene	The Unquiet Englishman: A Life of Graham Greene	Shortlist	
2022	James McGrath Morris	Tony Hillerman: A Life	Shortlist	
2022	John Tresch	The Reason for the Darkness of the Night: Edgar Allan Poe and the Forging of American Science	Shortlist	
2023	Martin Edwards	The Life of Crime: Detecting the History of Mysteries and Their Creators	Winner	
2023	Mary Anna Evans and J. C. Bernthal (editors)	The Bloomsbury Handbook to Agatha Christie	Shortlist	
2023	David Geherin	The Crime World of Michael Connelly: A Study of His Works and Their Adaptations	Shortlist	
2023	Andrew Neiderman	The Woman Beyond the Attic: The V.C. Andrews Story	Shortlist	
2023	Lucy Worsley	Agatha Christie: An Elusive Woman	Shortlist	
2024	Steven Powell	Love Me Fierce in Danger: The Life of James Ellroy	Winner	
2024	David Bordwell	Perplexing Plots: Popular Storytelling and the Poetics of Murder	Shortlist	
2024	Max Allan Collins and James L. Traylor	Spillane: King of Pulp Fiction	Shortlist	
2024	Mark Dawidziak	A Mystery of Mysteries: The Death and Life of Edgar Allan Poe	Shortlist	
2024	Robert Morgan	Fallen Angel: The Life of Edgar Allan Poe	Shortlist	
2025	Nathan Ashman	James Sallis: A Companion to the Mystery Fiction	Winner	
2025	M. Keith Booker	American Noir Film: From The Maltese Falcon to Gone Girl	Shortlist	
2025	David Geherin	Organized Crime on Page and Screen: Portrayals in Hit Novels, Films, and Television Shows	Shortlist	
2025	Ashley Lawson	On Edge: Gender and Genre in the Work of Shirley Jackson, Patricia Highsmith, and Leigh Brackett	Shortlist	
2025	Nicholas Shakespeare	Ian Fleming: The Complete Man	Shortlist	
2026	Richard Kopley	Edgar Allan Poe: A Life	Winner	
2026	Kathryn Harkup	V is for Venom: Agatha Christie’s Chemicals of Death	Shortlist	
2026	Andrew Klavan	The Kingdom of Cain: Finding God in the Literature of Darkness	Shortlist	
2026	C. M. Kushins	Cooler Than Cool: The Life and Work of Elmore Leonard	Shortlist	
2026	Stephen Rebello	Criss-Cross: The Making of Hitchcock’s Dazzling, Subversive Masterpiece Strangers on a Train	Shortlist	
