= John Curran (literary scholar) =

Irish literary scholar and archivist

John Curran is an Irish literary scholar and archivist, best known as an expert on the work of Dame Agatha Christie, English author of detective fiction and the world's bestselling novelist. He was born in Dublin and for years edited the Agatha Christie newsletter, subscriptions to which are handled through the author's official website. He wrote his doctoral thesis on Christie at Trinity College. He served as a National Trust consultant during the restoration of Christie's Devon residence, the Greenway Estate.

With the assistance of Christie's grandson, Mathew Prichard, he has researched the author's personal archives and notebooks. He has written two books on the subject, the first containing two previously unpublished Poirot short stories: the short story on which Christie's novel Dumb Witness was based; and the original version of Christie's short story "The Capture of Cerberus". The second features the previously unpublished original version of the Miss Marple short story "The Case of the Caretaker". He has also collaborated with the most famous illustrator of Christie's paperback editions, Tom Adams, on Tom Adams Uncovered, collecting the covers he produced for the author. Curran's fourth book, The Hooded Gunman, collects covers of detective novels by more than 250 writers, published under the Collins Crime Club label (containing an image of a hooded gunman) during its lifespan from 1930 to 1994.

To promote his first scholarly work on the subject of Christie's archive, in 2009 he wrote an article for The Guardian listing what he considers her ten best novels. For the Agatha Awards, Cullan won the Best Non-Fiction category with his 2010 publication Agatha Christie’s Secret Notebooks: 50 Years of Mysteries in the Making. The following year, Agatha Christie: Murder in the Making: More Stories and Secrets from Her Notebooks was nominated for Best Non-Fiction at the 2011 Agatha Awards.

== Bibliography ==
- Agatha Christie's Secret Notebooks: Fifty Years of Mysteries in the Making (2009, updated and re-released with an introduction by David Suchet in 2016)
- Agatha Christie's Murder in the Making: Stories and Secrets from Her Archive (2011)
- Tom Adams Uncovered: The Art of Agatha Christie and Beyond (2015)
- The Hooded Gunman: An Illustrated History of Collins Crime Club (2019)
- The Murder Game: Play, Puzzles and The Golden Age (2025)

=== Other material ===
- afterword for Hercule Poirot and the Greenshore Folly, a previously unpublished novella by Christie written to raise money for a church, but left unpublished until 2013.
