= The Hollow =

1946 Poirot novel by Agatha Christie

- Dust-jacket illustration of the first American edition. See Publication history (below) for UK first edition jacket image.
- Author: Agatha Christie
- Cover artist: Unknown
- Language: English
- Series: Hercule Poirot
- Genre: Crime novel
- Publisher: Dodd, Mead and Company
- Publication date: 1946
- Publication place: United Kingdom
- Media type: Print (hard~ & paperback)
- Pages: 279 (1st edition, hardcover)
- Preceded by: Five Little Pigs
- Followed by: The Labours of Hercules (short stories)

The Hollow is a work of detective fiction by British writer Agatha Christie, first published in the United States by Dodd, Mead & Co. in 1946 and in the United Kingdom by the Collins Crime Club in November of the same year. The American edition retailed at $2.50 and the UK edition at eight shillings and sixpence (8/6). A paperback edition in the United States by Dell Books in 1954 changed the title to Murder after Hours.

The novel is an example of a "country house mystery" and was the first of her novels in four years to feature the Belgian detective Hercule Poirot—one of the longest gaps in the entire series. Agatha Christie, who often admitted that she did not like Poirot (a fact parodied by her recurring novelist character Ariadne Oliver), particularly disliked his appearance in this novel. His late arrival, jarring, given the established atmosphere, led her to claim in her Autobiography that she ruined the novel by the introduction of Poirot. Agatha Christie's successful career foresaw the use of her eight owned houses as settings for her novels, which were Taken at the Flood, Dead Man's Folly, Five Little Pigs, A Pocket Full of Rye, and Crooked House. However, the setting for The Hollow was inspired by Francis L. Sullivan's house. Francis Loftus Sullivan was an English film and stage actor who portrayed Hercule Poirot in the plays Black Coffee (1930) and Peril at End House (1932) and also played the lead in The Witness for the Prosecution (1953), for which he won a Tony Award in 1955.

== Plot summary ==
=== Introduction ===
Dr John Christow is a successful physician and leading researcher, although very tired and irritated by his current life. On the morning that he and his downtrodden wife, Gerda, are due to travel down to the country to weekend with friends, Christow allows his little daughter to tell his fortune with cards. When the death card is drawn, he pays no attention, but the appearance of an old flame at The Hollow seems to be the final link in a chain of fatal circumstances.

=== Summary ===
The eccentric Lucy Angkatell has invited the Christows, along with other members of her extended family, to her estate for the weekend. John Christow is carrying on an affair with Henrietta Savernake, a talented sculptor. The beautiful Veronica Cray, an old flame of Christow's, suddenly appears in the house on Saturday night to borrow a box of matches. She lives at a nearby cottage. Another cottage is occupied by Hercule Poirot, who has been invited for Sunday lunch. John walks Veronica back to her cottage, and returns home at 3 am. The next day, Poirot is witness to a scene that seems strangely staged. Gerda Christow stands with a gun in her hand next to John's body, as it bleeds into the swimming pool. Lucy, Henrietta, and Edward (a cousin of Lucy's and a second cousin of Henrietta) are also present at the scene. John utters a final urgent appeal, "Henrietta", and dies.

It seems obvious that Gerda is the murderer. Henrietta steps forward to take the revolver from her hand, but apparently fumbles and drops it into the swimming pool, destroying the evidence. However, the pistol that Gerda was holding was not the gun used to kill John. None of the witnesses has seen Gerda shoot John. It seems difficult to build a case against any of the other potential suspects. Lucy was the next suspect, as she was seen with a gun in her basket of eggs. However, the gun was the wrong calibre. Henrietta is the next suspect, having left an unusual doodle in the pavilion around the time John was killed. When the murder weapon turns up in Poirot's hedge, it has fingerprints that match none of the suspects.

The family had deliberately misdirected Poirot, as they each knew Gerda was the murderer, and were attempting to save her from imprisonment. Gerda had taken two pistols – shooting John with one, and then planning to be discovered with the other pistol in her hand, later proven not to be the murder weapon. Immediately, Henrietta understood that John's final appeal was for her to help Gerda. Instinctively, Henrietta assumed the responsibility by dropping the gun into the pool, and later goes back to retrieve the second weapon. She hides it in a clay sculpture of a horse in her workshop to avoid the police searches. Later, she gets it handled by a blind match-seller and then places it in Poirot's hedge.

Midge Hardcastle, a less affluent relative of the Angkatells, is also staying at the house. She is in love with Edward, but Edward has always been in love with Henrietta, who had refused several of his marriage proposals. Edward comes to the realisation that Henrietta is no longer the Henrietta he once loved. He looks at Midge and realises that she is no longer "little Midge". Edward asks her to marry him. He goes for a walk with Midge, but coming to a spot where Edward has previously walked with Henrietta, Midge believes that he is still too deeply in love with Henrietta. So, she calls off the wedding.

Edward does not understand that Midge loves him too much to hold him back from Henrietta. Misunderstanding her decision, he attempts suicide by putting his head in a gas oven but he is saved by Midge. With this dramatic proof of his despair at losing her, she relents and the wedding is on again.

With the evidence apparently destroyed or suitably confused, the family believe they have saved Gerda. There is a final clue: the holster in which the murder weapon was kept. Gerda had cut this up and placed it in her workbag. Henrietta rushes to Gerda in an attempt to retrieve it and destroy the final proof of Gerda's guilt.

Poirot arrives, and rearranges the tea cups before Gerda returns from the kitchen. He suspects the cornered and suspicious Gerda would murder Henrietta. Gerda returns and drinks from the cup intended for Henrietta, and dies. Henrietta seeks closure and visits one of John's patients. John's death ended the hope of a cure but she is still showing a resilient spirit. Leaving the hospital, she reflects that there is no happy ending for her. She resolves to embark on a sculpture of herself as "Grief".

== Characters ==
- Hercule Poirot, renowned Belgian detective
- Inspector Grange, the investigating officer
- Sergeant Clark, a policeman in the case
- Dr John Christow, a Harley Street doctor. He is passionate about his work and dedicates himself to finding a cure for "Ridgeway's disease" – the aetiology of which bears a marked resemblance to multiple sclerosis. He is very self-confident, attractive, and has great charisma.
- Gerda Christow, John's wife. She is rather plain and gives the impression of being clumsy; she worries about everything. She idealises John, and blames herself for her problems, even when it is he who is wrong. She inspired a sculpture by Henrietta called "The Worshipper", which is described as being frightening as it has no face.
- Sir Henry Angkatell, the owner of The Hollow. He married his distant cousin, Lucy Angkatell.
- Edward Angkatell, a distant cousin of Henry and entailee of the family's beloved house, Ainswick. He has charm but is overshadowed by Christow's dominant personality. He lives in the past and has been devoted to Henrietta for many years. He despises himself, thinking he is good for nothing.
- Lucy, Lady Angkatell, Henry's wife, whose sociable, charismatic veneer hides a dark side to her personality, occasionally glimpsed by her family.
- Midge Hardcastle, Lucy's young cousin. Related to the Angkatell family through her mother, she refuses financial aid from them and works in a dressmaker's shop.
- David Angkatell, a student. Bookish, anti-social, and possessor of "modern" ideas regarding the working class. He tries to express an air of superiority.
- Henrietta Savernake, a sculptor, and cousin of Sir Henry, Lucy, Midge, Edward and David. She always knows the right words to say to make someone feel comfortable, albeit sometimes at the expense of the truth. Her art is the core of her being, which, at times, conflicts with her second important characteristic.
- Veronica Cray, an actress. She is very beautiful and abnormally egotistical. She wanted Christow to abandon everything to follow her to Hollywood, but he rejected her; she found this unbearable. However, Christow is still attracted to her and, it is implied, had a one-night stand with her, which triggered Gerda's jealousy.
- Gudgeon, the butler; he is very protective of Lady Angkatell.
- Doris, the house maid
- Beryl Collins, John's secretary.
- Mrs Crabtree, a patient of John's, a victim of Ridgeway's Disease.
- Terence, John and Gerda's twelve-year-old son; perceptive, observant, analytical, curious and lonely.
- Zena, John and Gerda's nine-year-old daughter.

== Literary significance and reception ==
Maurice Richardson, in the 1 December 1946 issue of The Observer, wrote: "Agatha Christie has staged, against her smartest, most hyperemotional background so far, the shooting of a philandering doctor. Solution by a rather subdued Poirot. Good double-bluff surprise."

Robert Barnard: "Notable specimen, with more complex characterization than usual, and occasionally rising to wit (especially on the subject of cooking). Illustrates vividly one dilemma of the detective writer: if you establish characters of some psychological complexity, how do you prevent the routine detection stuff coming as an anticlimax? Christie records that her daughter protested against her decision to dramatize the book, and the instinct was probably right: most of the interest here, unusually, is internal, and difficult to present via Christie's rather old-fashioned stage techniques. Definitely among the top ten, in spite of the falling-off in the second half."

Modern French novelist Michel Houellebecq, an admirer of the book, described it in his 2001 novel Platform as "a strange, poignant book; these are deep waters [she writes about], with powerful undercurrents."

== Film, TV or theatrical adaptations ==
=== Stage play ===
Christie adapted the book into a highly successful stage play in 1951 but omitted Poirot from the narrative.

=== British television movie ===
In 2004, the novel was broadcast as a television movie featuring David Suchet as Poirot, Sarah Miles as Lady Angkatell, Edward Hardwicke as Sir Henry Angkatell, Jonathan Cake as John Christow, Claire Price as Gerda Christow, Megan Dodds as Henrietta Savernake, Lysette Anthony as Veronica Cray and Edward Fox as Gudgeon, as part of the series Agatha Christie's Poirot.

The character of David Angkatell and some details are omitted (for example, the drawing of the card representing death). The ending is significantly altered (Gerda doesn't attempt to poison Henrietta and instead commits suicide).

=== French television episode ===
A French adaptation as part of the television series Les Petits Meurtres d'Agatha Christie was broadcast in 2021 Les Petits Meurtres d'Agatha Christie#Series Three: 1970s France.

=== French movie ===
The Great Alibi (French: Le Grand Alibi) is a 2008 French mystery film directed by Pascal Bonitzer. The screenplay is based on The Hollow, although Poirot doesn't appear in this film version.

== Publication history ==
Dustjacket illustration of the first UK edition (Book was first published in the United States)

- 1946, Dodd Mead and Co. (New York), 1946, Hardback, 279 pp.
- 1946, Collins Crime Club (London), November 1946, Hardback, 256 pp.
- 1948, Pocket Books (New York), Paperback (Pocket number 485)
- 1950, Pan Books, Paperback, 239 pp. (Pan number 119)
- 1957, Fontana Books (Imprint of HarperCollins), Paperback, 189 pp.
- 1974, Ulverscroft Large-print Edition, Hardcover, 431 pp. ISBN 0-85456-301-6

The American serialisation of this story was a four-part shortened version in Collier's Weekly between 4 May (Volume 117, Number 18) and 25 May 1946 (Volume 117, Number 21) under the title of The Outraged Heart with illustrations by Mario Cooper.
