= Agatha Christie's Poirot =

British television detective series (1989–2013)

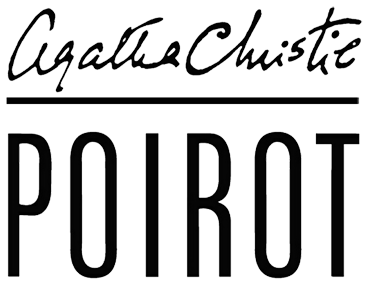
- Genre: Crime drama
- Based on: Hercule Poirot stories by Agatha Christie
- Screenplay by: Clive Exton and others
- Starring: David Suchet
- Composers: Christopher Gunning (series 1–9); Stephen McKeon (series 10–11); Christian Henson (series 12–13)
- Country of origin: United Kingdom
- Original language: English
- No. of series: 13
- No. of episodes: 70 (list of episodes)

Production
- Producers: Brian Eastman and others
- Running time: 36 x ~50 minutes; 34 x ~89–102 minutes
- Production companies: LWT (1989–2002); LWT Productions (1989–1996); Granada Productions (2002–2008); Agatha Christie Ltd. (1989–2013); ITV Productions (2008–2009); ITV Studios (2009–2013); WGBH Boston (2008–2013); Carnival Films (1993–1994); Mittal Productions (1990–2009); Picture Partnership Productions (1994–1996)

Original release
- Network: ITV
- Release: 8 January 1989 – 13 November 2013

Agatha Christie's Poirot, or simply Poirot (UK: /pwɑːroʊ/), is a British mystery drama television programme that aired on ITV from 8 January 1989 to 13 November 2013. The ITV show is based on one of Agatha Christie's famous crime fiction series, which revolves around the fictional private investigator Hercule Poirot. David Suchet stars as the title character. Initially produced by LWT, the series was later produced by ITV Studios. The series also aired on VisionTV in Canada, and on PBS and A&E in the US.

The programme ran for 13 series and 70 episodes in total. Each episode was adapted from a novel or short story by Christie that featured Poirot. At the programme's conclusion, which finished with "Curtain: Poirot's Last Case", based on the 1975 novel of the same name, every major literary work by Christie that featured the title character had been adapted.

== Cast ==
David Suchet was cast as the eponymous Hercule Poirot. He was portrayed, especially in the earlier series, alongside Hugh Fraser as the closest friend of Poirot, Captain Arthur Hastings, as well as Pauline Moran playing Poirot's clever secretary, Felicity Lemon, and Philip Jackson depicting Poirot's long-standing associate, Inspector James Japp.

Towards the later series, other characters such as Poirot's English butler, George, played by David Yelland, and crime novelist Ariadne Oliver, played by Zoë Wanamaker, feature and become prominent. Several actors played multiple parts specific to certain episodes, including Nicholas Farrell and Beatie Edney.

List of main and recurring Poirot characters, with actors, by series (season)
Character	Series												
Character	1	2	3	4	5	6	7	8	9	10	11	12	13
Hercule Poirot	David Suchet	David Suchet	David Suchet	David Suchet	David Suchet	David Suchet	David Suchet	David Suchet	David Suchet	David Suchet	David Suchet	David Suchet	David Suchet
Captain Arthur Hastings	Hugh Fraser	Hugh Fraser	Hugh Fraser	Hugh Fraser	Hugh Fraser	Hugh Fraser	Hugh Fraser	Hugh Fraser					Hugh Fraser
Chief Inspector James Japp	Philip Jackson	Philip Jackson	Philip Jackson	Philip Jackson	Philip Jackson	Philip Jackson	Philip Jackson	Philip Jackson					Philip Jackson
Miss Felicity Lemon	Pauline Moran	Pauline Moran	Pauline Moran		Pauline Moran	Pauline Moran	Pauline Moran	Pauline Moran					Pauline Moran
Detective Inspector Jameson	John Cording	John Cording											
Countess Vera Rossakoff			Kika Markham										Orla Brady
Ariadne Oliver										Zoë Wanamaker	Zoë Wanamaker	Zoë Wanamaker	Zoë Wanamaker
George										David Yelland	David Yelland	David Yelland	David Yelland
Superintendent Harold Spence										Richard Hope	Richard Hope		

== Episodes ==
Series	Episodes	Originally released		Avg. UK viewers (millions)
Series	Episodes	First released	Last released	Avg. UK viewers (millions)
1	10	8 January 1989	19 March 1989	TBA
2	9	7 January 1990	4 March 1990	TBA
3	11	16 September 1990	10 March 1991	TBA
4	3	5 January 1992	19 January 1992	TBA
5	8	17 January 1993	7 March 1993	TBA
6	4	1 January 1995	16 March 1996	TBA
7	2	2 January 2000	19 February 2000	9.12
8	2	20 April 2001	8 July 2001	7.21
9	4	14 December 2003	26 April 2004	7.27
10	4	11 December 2005	2 April 2006	6.98
11	4	1 September 2008	22 September 2008	5.18
12	4	30 December 2009	11 July 2010	5.12
13	5	9 June 2013	13 November 2013	5.53

== Production ==
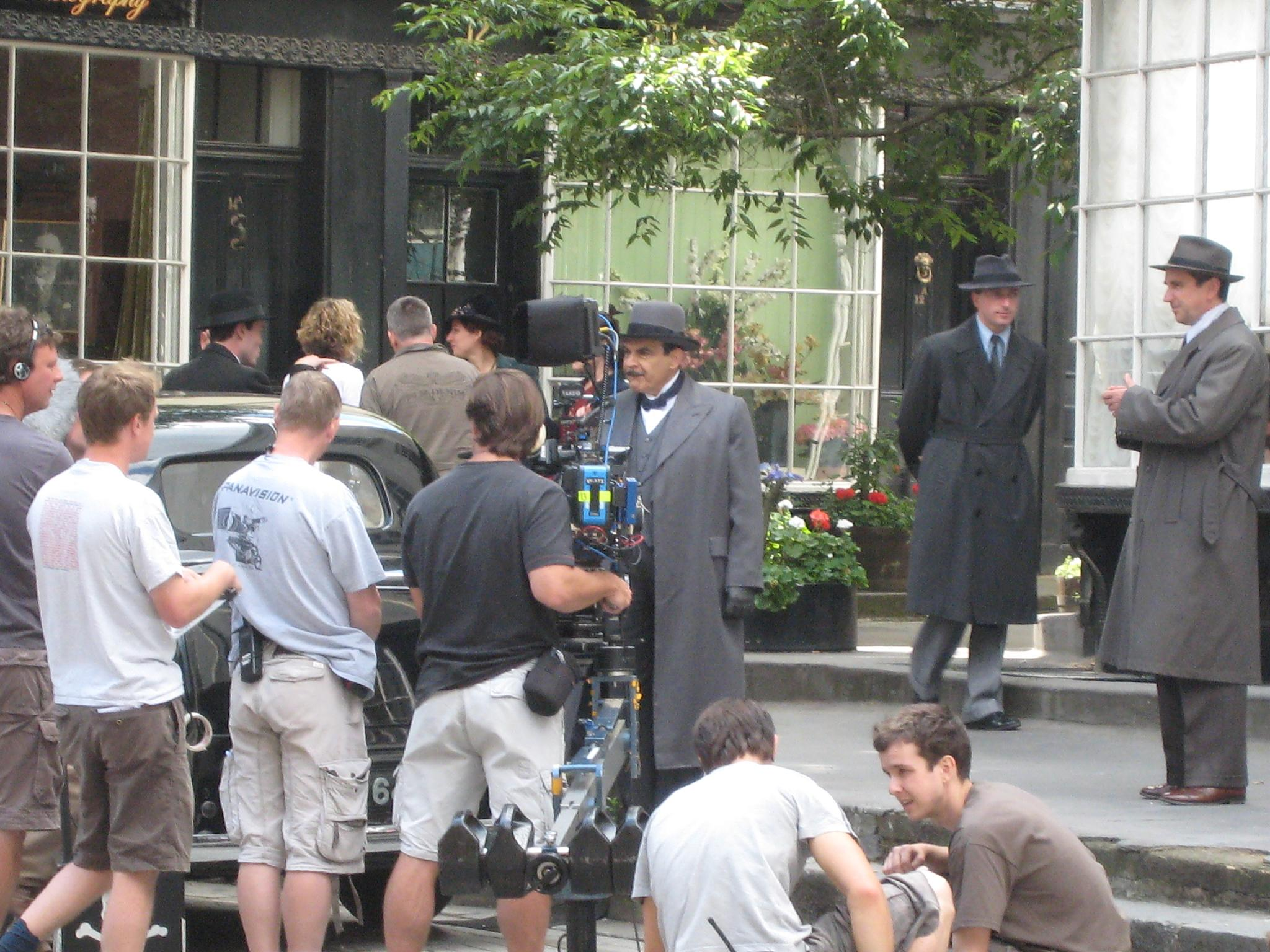
Filming Poirot in London, from the episode "The Clocks" (Series 12, Episode 4)

Clive Exton in partnership with producer Brian Eastman adapted the pilot. Together, they wrote and produced the first eight series. Exton and Eastman left Poirot after 2001, when they began work on Rosemary & Thyme. Michele Buck and Damien Timmer, who both went on to form Mammoth Screen, were behind the revamping of the series.

While Christie's novels are set contemporaneously with the time of writing (between the 1920s and 1970s), 1936 was chosen as the year in which to place the majority of early Poirot episodes; references to events such as the Jarrow March were included to strengthen this chronology. With some exceptions, the series as a whole is set roughly in chronological order between 1935 and 1939, just prior to the Second World War. Numerous references in early episodes place the series primarily in 1935, progressing to 1936 by series four. Most references remain in 1936, moving slowly forward to 1937 by series eleven and 1938 by Murder on the Orient Express. The Big Four is set explicitly in early 1939. The most notable exceptions to this chronology are The Mysterious Affair at Styles, which narrates Poirot's first case in 1917, and Curtain: Poirot's Last Case, which is set primarily in 1949. The Chocolate Box shows Poirot in the early 1900s, though the framing narrative remains consistent with the series' usual timeframe.

The opening titles were designed by Pat Gavin, and feature Art Deco–Cubist–style iconography, partly inspired by Cassandre, including images of Battersea Power Station, biplanes, boats, and a train with Poirot's name formed by the wheels.

The episodes aired from series 9 in 2003 featured a radical shift in tone from the previous series. The humour of the earlier series was downplayed, with each episode being presented as serious drama and saw the introduction of gritty elements not present in the Christie stories being adapted. Recurrent motifs in the additions included drug use, sex, abortion, homosexuality, and a tendency toward more visceral imagery. The visual style of later episodes was correspondingly different: particularly, an overall darker tone; austere modernist or Art Deco locations and decor that were widely used earlier in the series were largely dropped in favour of more elaborate settings (epitomised by the re-imagining of Poirot's home as a larger, more lavish apartment).

The series logo was redesigned (the full opening title sequence had not been used since series 6 in 1996), and the main theme motif, though used often, was usually featured subtly and in sombre arrangements; this has been described as a consequence of the novels adapted being darker and more psychologically driven. However, a more upbeat string arrangement of the theme music is used for the end credits of "Hallowe'en Party", "The Clocks" and "Dead Man's Folly". In flashback scenes, later episodes also made extensive use of fisheye lens, distorted colours, and other visual effects.

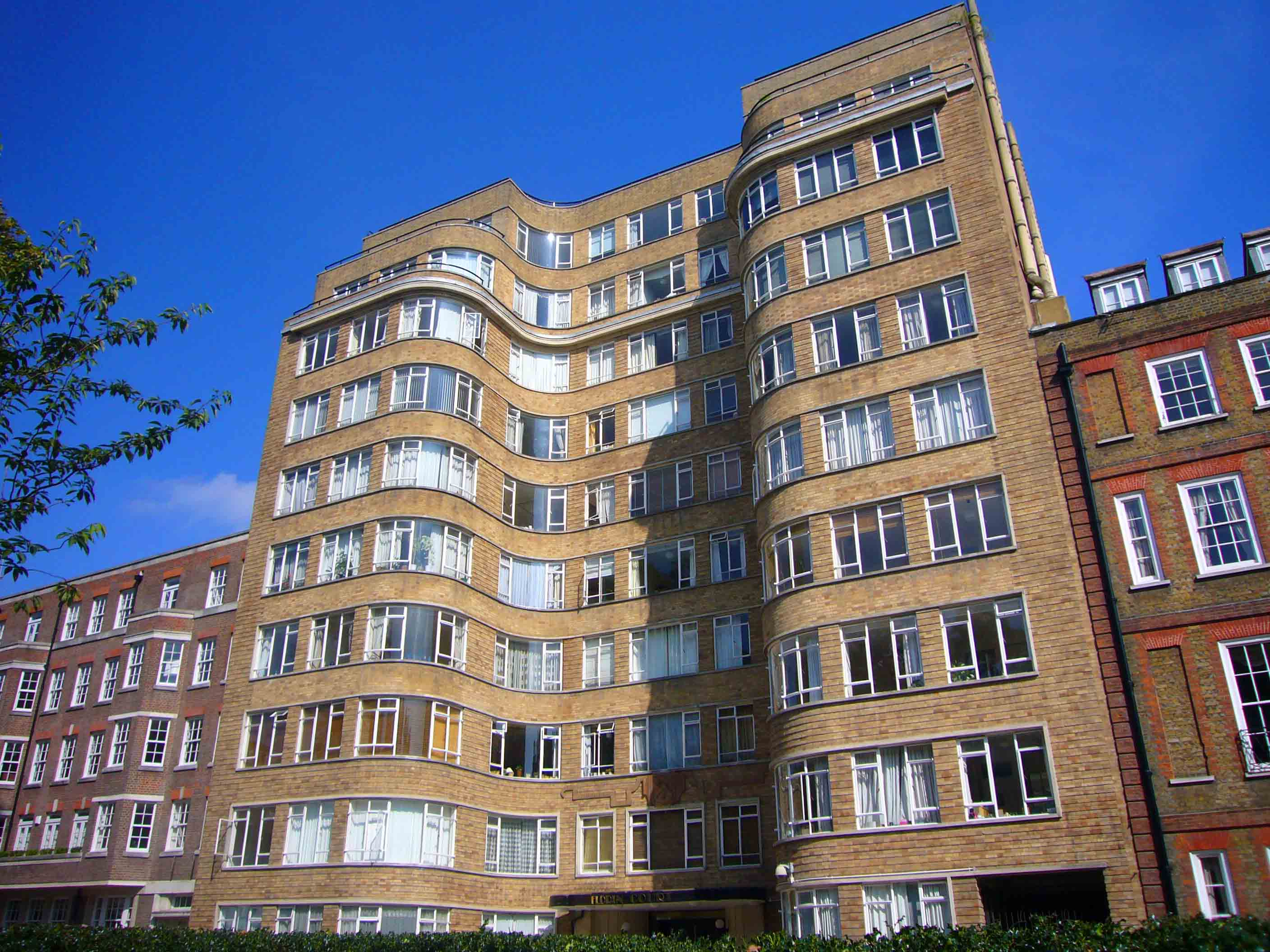
Florin Court was used to represent Whitehaven Mansions.

Series 9–12 lack Hugh Fraser, Philip Jackson and Pauline Moran, who had appeared in the previous series (excepting series 4, where Moran is absent). Series 10 (2006) introduced Zoë Wanamaker as the eccentric crime novelist Ariadne Oliver and David Yelland as Poirot's dependable valet, George – a character that had been introduced in the early Poirot novels but was left out of the early adaptations to develop the character of Miss Lemon. The introduction of Wanamaker and Yelland's characters and the absence of the other characters is generally consistent with the stories on which the scripts were based. Hugh Fraser and David Yelland returned for two episodes of the final series (The Big Four and Curtain), with Philip Jackson and Pauline Moran returning for the adaptation of The Big Four. Zoë Wanamaker also returned for the adaptations of Elephants Can Remember and Dead Man's Folly.

Clive Exton adapted seven novels and fourteen short stories for the series, including "The ABC Murders" and "The Murder of Roger Ackroyd", which received mixed reviews from critics. Anthony Horowitz was another prolific writer for the series, adapting three novels and nine short stories, while Nick Dear adapted six novels. Comedian and novelist Mark Gatiss wrote three episodes and also guest-starred in the series, as have Peter Flannery and Kevin Elyot. Ian Hallard, who co-wrote the screenplay for "The Big Four" with Mark Gatiss, appears in the episode and also in "Hallowe'en Party", which was scripted by Gatiss alone.

Florin Court in Charterhouse Square, London, was used as Poirot's London residence, Whitehaven Mansions. The final episode to be filmed was "Dead Man's Folly" in June 2013 on the Greenway Estate (which was Agatha Christie's home) broadcast on 30 October 2013. Most of the locations and buildings where the episodes were shot were given fictional names.

=== Casting ===
Suchet was recommended for the part by Christie's family, who had seen him appear as Blott in the TV adaptation of Tom Sharpe's Blott on the Landscape. Suchet, a method actor, said that he prepared for the part by reading all the Poirot novels and every short story, and copying out every piece of description about the character. Suchet told The Strand Magazine: "What I did was, I had my file on one side of me and a pile of stories on the other side and day after day, week after week, I ploughed through most of Agatha Christie's novels about Hercule Poirot and wrote down characteristics until I had a file full of documentation of the character. And then it was my business not only to know what he was like, but to gradually become him. I had to become him before we started shooting".

During the filming of the first series, Suchet almost left the production during an argument with a director, insisting that Poirot's odd mannerisms (in this case, putting a handkerchief down before sitting on a park bench) be featured; he later said "there's no question [Poirot's] obsessive-compulsive". According to many critics and enthusiasts, Suchet's characterisation is considered to be the most accurate interpretation of all the actors who have played Poirot, and the closest to the character in the books. In 2013, Suchet revealed that Christie's daughter Rosalind Hicks had told him she was sure Christie would have approved of his performance.

In 2007, Suchet spoke of his desire to film the remaining stories in the canon and hoped to achieve this before his 65th birthday in May 2011. Despite speculation of cancellation early in 2011, the remaining books were ultimately adapted into a thirteenth series, adapted in 2013 into 5 episodes, from which "Curtain" aired last on 13 November. A 2013 television special, Being Poirot, centred on Suchet's characterisation and his emotional final episode.

=== Actors ===
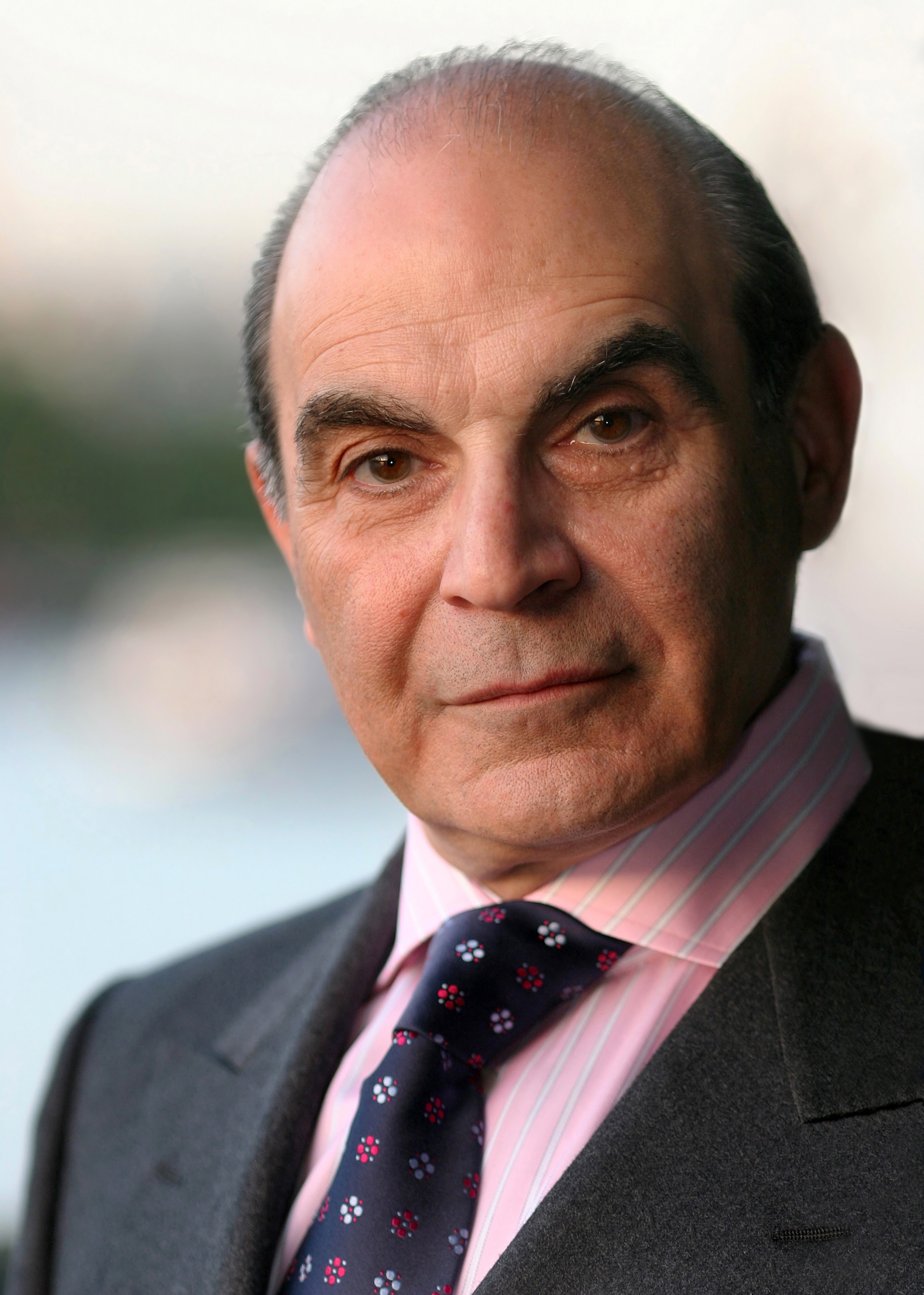
David Suchet

Alongside recurring characters, the early series featured actors who later achieved greater fame, including Sean Pertwee ("The King of Clubs", 1989; "Dead Man's Folly", 2013), Joely Richardson ("The Dream", 1989), Polly Walker ("Peril at End House", 1990), Samantha Bond ("The Adventure of the Cheap Flat", 1990), Christopher Eccleston ("One, Two, Buckle My Shoe", 1992), Hermione Norris ("Jewel Robbery at The Grand Metropolitan", 1993), Damian Lewis ("Hickory Dickory Dock", 1995), Jamie Bamber ("The Murder of Roger Ackroyd", 2000), Russell Tovey ("Evil Under the Sun", 2001), Kelly Reilly ("Sad Cypress", 2003), Aidan Gillen ("Five Little Pigs", 2003), Emily Blunt ("Death on the Nile", 2004), Alice Eve ("The Mystery of the Blue Train", 2005), Michael Fassbender ("After the Funeral", 2006), Ruth Gemmell ("Mrs McGinty's Dead", 2008), Toby Jones and Jessica Chastain ("Murder on the Orient Express", 2010), and Tom Ellis ("Dead Man's Folly", 2013).

Four Academy Award nominees have appeared in the series: Sarah Miles, Barbara Hershey, Elizabeth McGovern and Elliott Gould. Peter Capaldi, Jessica Chastain, Michael Fassbender, Lesley Manville, Vanessa Kirby and Emily Blunt went on to receive Academy Award nominations after appearing on the show (with Chastain winning the Best Actress award in 2022 for The Eyes of Tammy Faye). Several members of British thespian families appeared in episodes throughout the course of the series. James Fox appeared as Colonel Race in "Death on the Nile", and his older brother Edward Fox appeared as Gudgeon in "The Hollow".

Three of the Cusack sisters each appeared in an episode: Niamh Cusack in "The King of Clubs", Sorcha Cusack in "Jewel Robbery at The Grand Metropolitan", and Sinéad Cusack in "Dead Man's Folly". Phyllida Law and her daughter Sophie Thompson appeared in "Hallowe'en Party". David Yelland appeared as Charles Laverton West in "Murder in the Mews" and as George for the remainder of the series from Series 10 onward, and his daughter Hannah Yelland appeared as Geraldine Marsh in "Lord Edgware Dies".

==== Multiple roles ====
Actors performing in multiple roles in Poirot episodes
Actor	Character	Episode
Nicholas Farrell	Donald Fraser	"The ABC Murders" (1992)
Nicholas Farrell	Major Richard Knighton	"The Mystery of the Blue Train" (2006)
Pip Torrens	Major Rich	"The Mystery of the Spanish Chest" (1991)
Pip Torrens	Jeremy Cloade	"Taken at the Flood" (2006)
Haydn Gwynne	Coco Courtney	"The Affair at the Victory Ball" (1991)
Haydn Gwynne	Miss Battersby	"Third Girl" (2008)
Geoffrey Beevers	Mr Tolliver	"Problem at Sea" (1989)
Geoffrey Beevers	Seddon	"Sad Cypress" (2003)
Simon Shepherd	David Hall	"Jewel Robbery at the Grand Metropolitan" (1993)
Simon Shepherd	Dr. Rendell	"Mrs McGinty's Dead" (2008)
Richard Lintern	John Lake	"Dead Man's Mirror" (1993)
Richard Lintern	Guy Carpenter	"Mrs McGinty's Dead" (2008)
Richard Durden	Dr Pritchard	"The Case of the Missing Will" (1993)
Richard Durden	Pebmarsh	"Taken at the Flood" (2006)
John Carson	Sir George Carrington	"The Incredible Theft" (1989)
John Carson	Richard Abernethie	"After the Funeral" (2006)
Carol MacReady	Mildred Croft	"Peril at End House" (1990)
Carol MacReady	Miss Johnson	"Cat Among the Pigeons" (2008)
Miranda Forbes	Landlady	"Double Sin" (1990)
Miranda Forbes	Mrs Turton	"The ABC Murders" (1992)
Pat Gorman	Desk Sergeant	"The ABC Murders" (1992)
Pat Gorman	London Man	"The Case of the Missing Will" (1993)
Beth Goddard	Violet Wilson	"The Case of the Missing Will" (1993)
Beth Goddard	Sister Agnieszka	"Appointment with Death" (2008 [DVD release], 2009 [aired])
Lucy Liemann	Miss Burgess	"Cards on the Table" (2005)
Lucy Liemann	Sonia	"Third Girl" (2008)
David Yelland	Charles Laverton West	"Murder in the Mews" (1989)
David Yelland	George	"Taken at the Flood" (2006) "Mrs McGinty's Dead" (2008) "Third Girl" (2008) "Three Act Tragedy" (2010) "Hallowe'en Party" (2010) "The Big Four" (2013) "Curtain: Poirot's Last Case" (2013)
Fenella Woolgar	Ellis	"Lord Edgware Dies" (2000)
Fenella Woolgar	Elizabeth Whittaker	"Hallowe'en Party" (2010)
Beatie Edney	Mary Cavendish	"The Mysterious Affair at Styles" (1990)
Beatie Edney	Beryl Hemmings	"The Clocks" (2011)
Frances Barber	Lady Millicent Castle-Vaughan	"The Veiled Lady" (1990)
Frances Barber	Merlina Rival	"The Clocks" (2011)
Sean Pertwee	Ronnie Oglander	"The King of Clubs" (1989)
Sean Pertwee	Sir George Stubbs	"Dead Man's Folly" (2013)
Danny Webb	Porter	"The Adventure of the Clapham Cook" (1989)
Danny Webb	Superintendent Bill Garroway	"Elephants Can Remember" (2013)
Ian Hallard	Edmund Drake	"Hallowe'en Party" (2010)
Ian Hallard	Mercutio	"The Big Four" (2013)
Phyllida Law	Lady Isabel Carrington	"The Incredible Theft" (1989)
Phyllida Law	Mrs Louise Llewellyn-Smythe	"Hallowe'en Party" (2010)
Jane How	Lady at Ball	"The Mystery of the Blue Train" (2005)
Jane How	Lady Veronica	"Cat Among the Pigeons" (2008)
Patrick Ryecart	Charles Arundel	"Dumb Witness" (1996)
Patrick Ryecart	Sir Anthony Morgan	"The Labours of Hercules" (2013)
Barbara Barnes	Mrs Lester	"The Lost Mine" (1990)
Barbara Barnes	Louise Leidner	"Murder in Mesopotamia" (2002)
Tim Stern	Bellboy	"Jewel Robbery at the Grand Metropolitan" (1993)
Tim Stern	Alf Renny	"Third Girl" (2008)
Catherine Russell	Katrina Reiger	"How Does Your Garden Grow?" (1991)
Catherine Russell	Pamela Horsfall	"Mrs McGinty's Dead" (2008)
George Little	Dicker	"The Third Floor Flat" (1989) Triangle at Rhodes (1989) The Dream (1989) "Double Sin" (1990)
Richard Bebb	Mr Cameron	"The Adventure of the Clapham Cook" (1989)
Richard Bebb	Newsreel Voice	The Dream (1989) The Million Dollar Bond Robbery (1991) The Tragedy at Marsdon Manor (1991) The Murder on the Links (1996)

== Reception ==
=== Critical response ===
Agatha Christie's grandson Mathew Prichard commented: "Personally, I regret very much that she [Agatha Christie] never saw David Suchet. I think that visually he is much the most convincing and perhaps he manages to convey to the viewer just enough of the irritation that we always associate with the perfectionist, to be convincing!"

In 2008, the series was described by some critics as going "off piste", though not negatively, from its old format. It was praised for its new writers, more lavish productions, and a greater emphasis on the darker psychology of the novels. Significantly, it was noted for "Five Little Pigs" (adapted by Kevin Elyot) bringing out a homosexual subtext of the novel. Nominations for twenty BAFTAs were received between 1989 and 1991 for series 1–3.

=== Accolades ===
List of awards and nominations for Agatha Christie's Poirot
Award	Date of ceremony	Category	Nominee(s)	Result
British Academy Television Awards (1990)	1990	Best Original Television Music	Christopher Gunning	Won
British Academy Television Craft Awards (1990)	1990	Best Costume Design	Linda Mattock (series 1, episodes 2, 4, 7–8, 10)	Won
British Academy Television Craft Awards (1990)	1990	Best Costume Design	Sue Thomson (series 1, episodes 1, 3, 5–6, 9)	Nominated
British Academy Television Craft Awards (1990)	1990	Best Make-up	Hilary Martin, Christine Cant and Roseann Samuel	Won
British Academy Television Craft Awards (1990)	1990	Best Design	Rob Harris (series 1, episodes 1–2, 5, 8, 10)	Nominated
British Academy Television Craft Awards (1990)	1990	Best Graphics	Pat Gavin	Won
British Academy Television Awards (1991)	1991	Best Actor	David Suchet	Nominated
British Academy Television Awards (1991)	1991	Best Drama Series or Serial	Brian Eastman	Nominated
British Academy Television Craft Awards (1991)	1991	Best Costume Design	Linda Mattock and Sharon Lewis	Nominated
British Academy Television Craft Awards (1991)	1991	Best Film Sound	Ken Weston, Rupert Scrivener and Sound Team	Nominated
RTS Television Awards (1991)	1991	Best Tape or Film Editing – Drama	Derek Bain	Nominated
British Academy Television Awards (1992)	1992	Best Original Television Music	Christopher Gunning	Nominated
British Academy Television Awards (1992)	1992	Best Drama Series or Serial	Brian Eastman	Nominated
British Academy Television Craft Awards (1992)	1992	Best Costume Design	Robin Fraser-Paye (series 3, episodes 1, 4–5, 9–10)	Nominated
British Academy Television Craft Awards (1992)	1992	Best Costume Design	Elizabeth Waller (series 3, episodes 2–3, 6–8)	Nominated
British Academy Television Craft Awards (1992)	1992	Best Make-up	Janis Gould (series 3, episodes 2–3, 6–8)	Nominated
Edgar Awards (1992)	1992	Best Episode in a TV Series	"The Lost Mine"	Won
Satellite Award (2010)	2010	Best Actor – Miniseries or Television Film	David Suchet	Nominated
PGA Awards (2010)	2011	Outstanding Producer of Long-Form Television	"Murder on the Orient Express"	Nominated
Primetime Emmy Awards (2015)	2015	Outstanding Television Movie	"Curtain: Poirot's Last Case"	Nominated

== Home media ==
In the UK, ITV Studios Home Entertainment owns the home media rights.

In Region 1, Acorn Media has the rights to series 1–6 and 11–12. Series 7–10 are distributed by A&E, a co-producer on several of them. In North America, series 1–11 are available on Netflix and Amazon Prime instant streaming service. In Region 4, Acorn Media, distributed by Reel DVD, has begun releasing the series on DVD in Australia in complete season sets. As of 2024 they carry the entire series in various editions. Series 1–9 and 12 are available in Spain (Region 2) on Blu-ray with Spanish and English audio tracks. Dutch FilmWorks were reported to be the first company to release series 12, in 2010.

Beginning in 2011, Acorn began issuing the series on Blu-ray discs. As of November 2014, series 1 through 13 have all been issued on DVD and Blu-ray by Acorn. The A&E DVD releases of series 7 through 10 correspond to the A&E versions broadcast in America which were missing sections of the original video as originally broadcast in the United Kingdom. The Acorn releases of series 7 through 10 restore the missing video.

Home media releases of Poirot, showing series and episode numbers, with release dates
Release title	Series	No. of DVDs	No. of Blu-ray discs	Release date	Episode no.	Region no.	Released by
The Complete Collection	1–11	28	N/A	30 March 2009	1–61	2	ITV Studios
The Complete Collection	1–12	32	N/A	15 August 2011	1–65	2	ITV Studios
The Definitive Collection	1–13	35	N/A	18 November 2013	1–70	2	ITV Studios
The Early Cases Collection	1–6	18	13	23 October 2012	1–45	1	Acorn Media
The Definitive Collection	7–10	12	N/A	25 January 2011	46–57	1	A&E Home Video
The Movie Collection – Set 4	11	3	N/A	7 July 2009	58–59	1	Acorn Media
The Movie Collection – Set 5	11–12	3	N/A	27 July 2010	60–61, 64	1	Acorn Media
Murder on the Orient Express	12	N/A	1	26 October 2010	64	1	Acorn Media
The Movie Collection – Set 6	12	3	3	12 July 2011	62–63, 65	1	Acorn Media
The Final Cases Collection	7–13	13	13	4 November 2014	46–70	A	ITV Studios & Acorn Media
Complete Cases Collection	1–13	33	28	4 November 2014	1–70	1	ITV Studios & Acorn Media

== Being Poirot ==
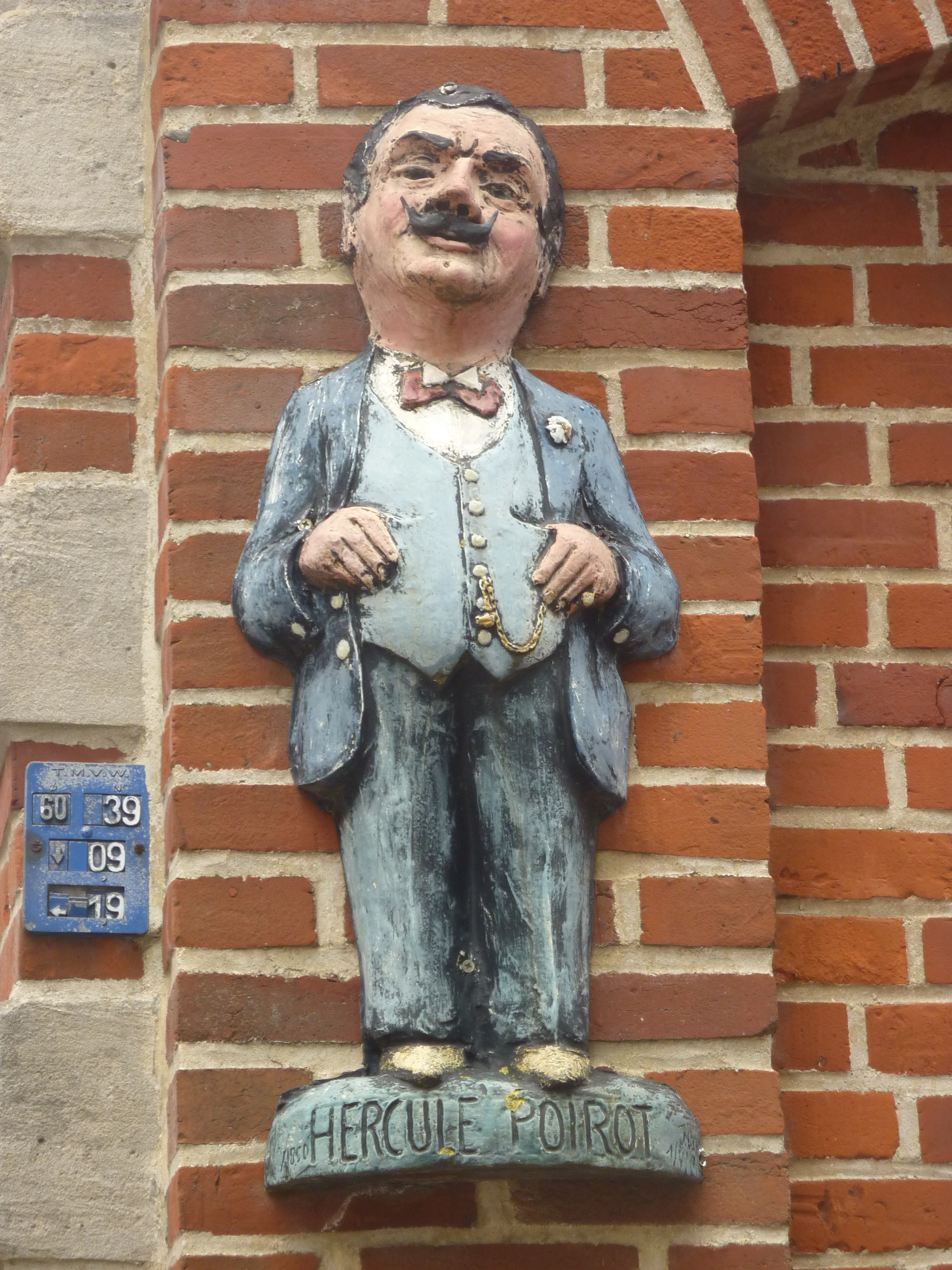
A statuette of Hercule Poirot in Ellezelles, Belgium

Being Poirot is a 50-minute 2013 ITV television documentary in which David Suchet attempts to unravel the mysterious appeal of Hercule Poirot and how he portrayed him. It was broadcast in the United Kingdom on the same evening as the final episode, "Curtain".

Suchet visits the Greenway Estate, Agatha Christie's summer home, recollecting how he met her daughter Rosalind Hicks and her husband Anthony Hicks for their approval before he began filming. He meets Christie's grandson Mathew Prichard who recounts how his grandmother found the character amongst Belgian refugees in Torquay. There's a visit to the permanent Poirot exhibition at Torquay Museum, to which he presented the cane he used in the television series.

Suchet acknowledges the first stage and film adaptations of the books with actors such as Charles Laughton on the London stage in Alibi, an adaptation of The Murder of Roger Ackroyd, in 1928. Alibi was filmed in 1931 with Austin Trevor but is now lost. The oldest surviving film portrayal from 1934 was Lord Edgware Dies again with Austin Trevor portraying Poirot. Suchet notes a conscious decision was made by the film company to portray Poirot without a moustache.

Films featuring Albert Finney and Peter Ustinov are also featured. Suchet reveals that he read the books and wrote down 93 notes about the character that he went on to use in his portrayal. The descriptions in the books helped him discover the voice he would use, and the rapid mincing gait.

Suchet also goes to Florin Court, a place that the production company chose to represent his home Whitehaven Mansions. There he meets first producer Brian Eastman, with whom he discusses the set that was built based on the flats, and Eastman's decision to fix the stories in 1936. Suchet also visits composer Christopher Gunning who had composed four themes for Eastman, the first being Gunning's favourite. Eastman chose the fourth after having Gunning darken the tone.

Suchet travels to Brussels, where he is feted by the police chief and mayor. He then goes to Ellezelles, which claims to be the birthplace of Poirot, and he is shown a birth certificate as proof. It says the date was 1 April, "April Fools' Day", with no year mentioned. Finally, Suchet travels on the Orient Express and recounts filming the episode "Dead Man's Folly" last at Greenway to finish on a high note.

== Novels or stories not included in the series ==
Suchet was proud to have completed the entire Poirot canon by the time of the broadcast of the final episode, only slightly short of the target he had set for himself in a 2007 interview of completing the entire canon before his 65th birthday.

A number of Poirot short stories were not directly adapted for the series. In most cases, these stories were subsequently reworked by Christie, and adapted for the television series in their final forms. "The Plymouth Express" was adapted in both its original short story form and as The Mystery of the Blue Train.

Original Story Title	Adaptation Title	Notes
The Lemesurier Inheritance (1923)	None	The episode "The Labours of Hercules" uses the surname "Lemesurier" from the original story, but otherwise has nothing in common with the story.
The Market Basing Mystery (1923)	"Murder in the Mews"	Re-worked by Christie
The Submarine Plans (1923)	"The Incredible Theft"	Re-worked by Christie
Christmas Adventure (1923)	"The Theft of the Royal Ruby"	Re-worked by Christie (also known as "The Adventure of the Christmas Pudding")
The Mystery of the Baghdad Chest (1932)	"The Mystery of the Spanish Chest"	Re-worked by Christie
The Second Gong (1932)	"Dead Man's Mirror"	Re-worked by Christie
The Incident of the Dog's Ball (written c.1933, posthumously published)	"Dumb Witness"	Re-worked by Christie
Poirot and the Regatta Mystery (1936)	None	Re-worked by Christie as a Parker Pyne story (published as part of The Regatta Mystery and Other Stories, 1939). Posthumously re-published in Hercule Poirot: the Complete Short Stories (2008).
The Capture of Cerberus (written c.1939, posthumously published)	None	Unrelated to the better known final case of the same title in The Labours of Hercules. Intended as the last of The Labours of Hercules, Christie re-wrote the entire story due to its political content, retaining only the title.
The Nemean Lion (1947)	"The Labours of Hercules"	Not directly adapted as part of the episode's combined narrative.
The Augean Stables (1947)	"The Labours of Hercules"	Not directly adapted as part of the episode's combined narrative.
Hercule Poirot and the Greenshore Folly (written 1954, posthumously published)	"Dead Man's Folly"	Re-worked by Christie
Black Coffee (play)	None	In 2012, Suchet performed a rehearsed reading of Black Coffee, produced and presented by The Agatha Christie Theatre Company, in aid of Chichester Festival Theatre's restoration fund.
