= The Great Alibi =

- Film poster
- Directed by: Pascal Bonitzer
- Written by: Jérôme Beaujour; Pascal Bonitzer
- Based on: The Hollow by Agatha Christie
- Produced by: Saïd Ben Saïd
- Starring: Caterina Murino; Valeria Bruni Tedeschi; Lambert Wilson; Miou-Miou; Nicole Garcia
- Cinematography: Marie Spencer
- Edited by: Monica Coleman
- Music by: Alexeï Aïgui
- Distributed by: UGC Distribution
- Release date: 30 April 2008
- Running time: 93 minutes
- Country: France
- Language: French
- Budget: €4.2 million
- Box office: $2.7 million

The Great Alibi (French: Le Grand Alibi) is a 2008 French mystery film directed by Pascal Bonitzer. The screenplay is based on the 1946 Hercule Poirot crime novel The Hollow, written by Agatha Christie, although, as with Christie's own 1951 stage adaptation, Poirot doesn't appear in this film version.

== Cast ==
- Pierre Arditi as Henri Pages
- Miou-Miou as Éliane Pages
- Lambert Wilson as Pierre Collier
- Anne Consigny as Claire Collier
- Valeria Bruni Tedeschi as Esther Bachmann
- Mathieu Demy as Philippe Léger
- Maurice Bénichou as Le commandant Grange
- Caterina Murino as Léa Mantovani
- Céline Sallette as Marthe
- Agathe Bonitzer as Chloë
- Emmanuelle Riva as Geneviève Herbin
- Dany Brillant as Michel
