= Poe-Land =

2014 book by J.W. Ocker

Poe-Land: The Hallowed Haunts of Edgar Allan Poe
- Author: J.W. Ocker
- Genre: Biography, Memoir, Non-fiction, Travel, History
- Published: 2014
- Publisher: Countryman Press
- Pages: 384
- Awards: Edgar Award for Best Critical/Biographical Works (2015)
- ISBN: 978-1-581-57221-6
- Website: Poe-Land

Poe-Land: The Hallowed Haunts of Edgar Allan Poe (ISBN 978-1-581-57221-6) is a book written by J.W. Ocker and published by Countryman Press on 6 October 2014 which later went on to win the Edgar Allan Poe Award for Best Critical/Biographical Work in 2015. It received a review in the Edgar Allan Poe Review.

The book is both a biography of American writer Edgar Allan Poe and a travel diary of the author studying Poe's legacy. It analyzes physical artefacts and landmarks of Poe's life, such as locks of his hair, pieces of his coffin, Poe's original manuscripts, the deathbed of Virginia Eliza Clemm Poe, and various memorials dedicated to the writer.
