= Agatha Christie's Secret Notebooks =

- First edition
- Author: John Curran
- Genre: Non-fiction, Crime
- Published: 2009
- Publisher: HarperCollins
- Pages: 492
- Awards: Anthony Award for Best Critical Nonfiction (2011)
- ISBN: 978-0-007-31056-2
- Followed by: Agatha Christie's Murder in the Making

Agatha Christie's Secret Notebooks: Fifty Years of Mysteries in the Making is a book written by John Curran and published by HarperCollins on 6 September 2009, which later went on to win the Anthony Award for Best Critical Nonfiction in 2011.

A sequel, titled Agatha Christie's Murder in the Making: More Stories and Secrets from Her Notebooks, was published by HarperCollins in 2012. This book included an unpublished version of The Case of the Caretaker, called The Case of the Caretaker's Wife.

The book includes two unpublished Hercule Poirot stories – a previous version of The Capture of Cerberus, and The Incident of the Dog's Ball. The Capture of Cerberus was originally intended to be included in The Labours of Hercules as the final story, but was rejected due to the political content – set just before World War II, it involves Poirot solving the shooting of the German dictator, 'August Hertzlein'. The Incident of the Dog's Ball was expanded into Dumb Witness. The stories was found in her notebooks by Curran, a Christie enthusiast.

== Unpublished stories ==
=== The Capture of Cerberus ===
Hercule Poirot, by the Lake of Geneva, meets Countess Vera Rossakoff. She introduces him to Herr Keiserbach, and mentions that he can 'bring the dead back to life'. Keiserbach later visits Poirot and asks him to clear his son's name. He reveals that he changed his name from Lutzmann. His son, Hans Lutzmann, shot August Hertzlein during a speech, and was immediately torn apart by the crowd. Keiserbach tells Poirot that his son was an avid supporter of Hertzlein, "a Nazi through and through".

Returning to Britain, Poirot hires Mr Higgs, a dog thief, and, with a cat burglar, they travel to a place in Alsace. Mr Higgs uses his skills to get the massive guard dog out of the way, while the cat burglar breaks into a certain room in the house, files the bars away, and with the aid of a silk ladder, lowers Hertzlein – a "short man with a bullet head and a little dark moustache" – to the ground. In a Paris-bound train, Poirot reveals how he guessed that the man that was shot was not Hertzlein – it was someone impersonating him. Hertzlein had been converted by a priest, and was about to start preaching peace. "Executive authorities in the Central Empires" kidnapped him and substituted a look-alike, who was then assassinated by two storm troopers who then accused Hans Lutzmann, forcing the gun into his hands. The real Hertzlein was put into an asylum, where no-one would believe him if he said who he was. Poirot sent out several young medical men to various asylums, one of whom found Hertzlein.

Hertzlein, freed, preaches peace to the nation. In Geneva, Poirot reads the news of Hertzlein. Rossakoff tells Poirot that this time, those who kidnapped him will really kill him. Poirot tells her that his legacy will live on, and presents her with the dog that Mr Higgs stole, calling it 'Cerberus'.

=== The Incident of the Dog's Ball ===
A Miss Matilda Wheeler writes to Poirot, expressing herself worried over little incidents. The letter is dated three months ago. Poirot, accompanied by Arthur Hastings, goes to investigate. At an inn, Poirot discovers that the writer of the letter died a month or two ago. The house was left to the lady’s companion, a Miss Lawson. Poirot visits Dr Lawrence, who attended her, and finds out that she died of yellow atrophy of the liver. Miss Lawson inherited everything, possibly due to influence through spiritualism. Poirot and Hastings tour the house, meeting Bob, a fox terrier. Poirot learns that she made her will leaving everything to Miss Lawson after falling down the stairs, having supposedly slipped on Bob's ball.

Poirot interviews Miss Wheeler's two surviving relatives, James Graham and Mollie Davidson. Graham reveals that Miss Wheeler had told him of the new will, but had not told Mollie. Poirot requests that they should get an order of exhumation, which they refuse. After they leave, Poirot makes a visit to Miss Lawson. She tells him that on the day of Miss Wheeler being taken ill, they held a seance. Miss Lawson saw a luminous halo around Miss Wheeler's head. Poirot sees a piece of needlework depicting a bulldog on the steps of a house, with the caption 'Out all night and no key!' He deduces that Bob was out that night. He further deduces, after questioning Miss Lawson more, that Miss Wheeler was poisoned with phosphorus. As Miss Wheeler suffered from jaundice, the symptoms would not be noticed. The luminous haze that Miss Lawson saw was Miss Wheeler's luminous breath, caused by the phosphorus. The phosphorus was administered in the form of a pill, hidden among her digestive pills.

Poirot further deduces that Mollie Davidson was the murderer, seeking to get her share of the inheritance, not knowing that the will had been changed. Poirot writes to Mollie, telling what he has deduced. Mollie commits suicide two days later.
