= Dumb Witness =

1937 mystery novel by Agatha Christie

- Dust-jacket illustration of the first UK edition
- Author: Agatha Christie
- Cover artist: Not known
- Language: English
- Series: Hercule Poirot
- Genre: Crime novel
- Publisher: Collins Crime Club
- Publication date: 5 July 1937
- Publication place: United Kingdom
- Media type: Print (hardback & paperback)
- Pages: 320 (first edition, hardcover)
- Preceded by: Murder in the Mews
- Followed by: Death on the Nile

Dumb Witness is a mystery novel by British writer Agatha Christie, first published in the UK by the Collins Crime Club on 5 July 1937 and in the US by Dodd, Mead and Company later in the same year under the title of Poirot Loses a Client. The UK edition retailed at seven shillings and sixpence (7/6) and the US edition at $2.00.

The book features the Belgian detective Hercule Poirot and is narrated by his friend Arthur Hastings. It is the last book to feature the character of Hastings until the final Poirot novel, 1975's Curtain: Poirot's Last Case, which he also narrates.

Reviews of this novel at publication in 1937 were generally positive, though several pointed out what they considered to be plot weaknesses. The author does "this sort of thing so superlatively well", while The Times in London questioned one of the actions by the murderer: "who would use hammer and nails and varnish in the middle of the night near an open bedroom door?" In the New York Times, this novel was not considered "Mrs Christie's best, but she has produced a much-better-than-average thriller nevertheless", which is a view shared by "Torquemada" (Edward Powys Mathers), who called this "the least of all the Poirot books" and then concluded "Still, better a bad Christie than a good average." By contrast, Mary Dell considered this novel to be "Mrs Christie at her best". The Scotsman felt the author deserved "full marks" for this novel. A review in 1990 found this novel to be not very interesting, with obvious clues.

== Plot summary ==
Wealthy spinster Emily Arundell writes to Hercule Poirot in the belief she has been the victim of an attempted murder after a fall in her Berkshire home. Her family and household believe she tripped over a ball left by her Wire Fox Terrier, Bob. After Poirot receives the letter, he travels to Miss Arundell's home, only to learn she is dead; her physician, Dr Grainger, states her death was from chronic liver problems. While recovering from her earlier fall, she made a new will, which bequeathed her vast fortune and home to her paid companion, Minnie Lawson.

Seeking to investigate Miss Arundell's belief that someone wanted to murder her, Poirot, accompanied by Captain Hastings, notes that under her previous will, her nephew Charles and nieces Theresa and Bella would have inherited. All three consider contesting the will.

Visiting the house on the pretence of buying it, Poirot discovers a nail covered with varnish at the top of the stairs and deduces a string had been tied to it. Through Miss Arundell's last words, he concludes that not only was Bob out all night, but also that Miss Arundell fell down the stairs as a result of a tripwire, and there is a chance Miss Arundell was indeed murdered. Her family, therefore, become suspects in the matter.

During his investigation, Poirot learns that a luminous aura was noticed coming from the dead woman's mouth when she spoke during a seance. Visiting Miss Lawson at her home, he learns that she saw someone moving about on the night of Miss Arundell's fall, who wore a brooch with the initials "TA." At the same time, Miss Lawson's gardener recalls Charles inquiring about his arsenic-based weed killer and is surprised to find the bottle containing it nearly empty.

Bella later leaves her Greek husband Jacob, on the implication he bullies her, taking the children with her. After Miss Lawson helps hide them in a hotel, Poirot moves her to another for fear of a second murder; before he does, he gives her a summary of Miss Arundell's death. The next day, Bella is found dead from an overdose of sleeping medication.

Bringing the surviving family members together, Poirot reveals Bella was the murderer. She hated her husband and sought to separate from him and keep her children in England. As she had no means to do so, she resolved to kill Miss Arundell to hasten her inheritance. When the attempt with the tripwire failed, she filled one of Miss Arundell's patent capsules with elemental phosphorus, knowing the poison would mimic the symptoms of liver failure. The aura witnessed by those attending the seance was due to the poison Miss Arundell had unknowingly consumed.

When she found out her aunt changed her will and that Poirot had discovered the cause of her death, Bella found herself in a far worse quandary. She relinquished her children to their father before committing suicide; the medication was originally intended to be used to murder Jacob, who was to be her second victim.

Poirot reveals that Miss Lawson saw Bella on the night of Emily's fall, though in a mirror; the brooch's initials were reversed from that of "AT" – Arabella Tanios. The arsenic was stolen by Theresa, who intended to use it, but could not bear to do so in the end. A small sum of cash that went missing was later discovered to have been stolen by Charles; he knew his aunt had changed her will before her death. Knowing Emily wished for no scandal, Poirot honours this, while Miss Lawson decides to share her inheritance with Theresa, Charles, and Bella's children. Meanwhile, Poirot and Hastings find themselves returning home with Bob joining them.

== Characters ==
- Hercule Poirot: the renowned Belgian detective who solves the case.
- Captain Arthur Hastings: narrator, a friend of Poirot.
- Emily Arundell: wealthy older woman who never married, owner of Littlegreen House; last survivor of five siblings, Matilda, Emily, Arabella, Thomas, and Agnes. She was murdered by poison.
- Theresa Arundell: fashionable, attractive niece of Emily Arundell, not yet 30 years old; spent the capital she inherited at age 21 from her father; engaged to ambitious young doctor.
- Dr Rex Donaldson: Theresa's fiancé, and younger partner to Dr. Grainger.
- Charles Arundell: nephew of Emily Arundell and brother to Theresa, in his early thirties; son of Thomas Arundell and widowed Mrs Varley. He also spent the capital of his inheritance from his father, and settled in British Columbia, Canada.
- Bella Tanios: niece of Emily Arundell, cousin to Charles and Theresa; plain looking daughter of Arabella Arundell and Professor Biggs, who taught chemistry at an English university.
- Dr Jacob Tanios: Bella's husband, of Greek descent, a physician practicing in Smyrna.
- Edward Tanios: young son of Bella and Jacob.
- Mary Tanios: young daughter of Bella and Jacob, about 7 years old.
- Ellen: long time member of Emily Arundell's household staff.
- Wilhelmina (Minnie) Lawson: Emily Arundell's companion for the last year, and in her final will, sole heiress.
- Isabel and Julia Tripp: two eccentric sisters and amateur spiritualists who share a home near Littlegreen House.
- Dr Grainger: physician to Emily Arundell; in Market Basing since 1919.
- Miss Peabody: long time resident of village and friend of Emily Arundell, she knew all the Arundell siblings and shared her knowledge with Poirot.
- Bob: Wire Fox Terrier belonging to Emily Arundell and the titular dumb witness.

== Literary significance and reception ==
John Davy Hayward in the Times Literary Supplement (10 July 1937), while approving of Christie's work, commented on some length at what he felt was a central weakness of this book: "Who, in their senses, one feels, would use hammer and nails and varnish in the middle of the night within a few feet of an open door! – a door, moreover, that was deliberately left open at night for observation! And, incidentally, do ladies wear large brooches on their dressing gowns? .. These are small but tantalising points which it would not be worth raising in the work of a less distinguished writer than Mrs Christie; but they are worth recording, if only as a measure of curiosity and interest with which one approaches her problems and attempts to anticipate their solution."

In The New York Times Book Review (26 September 1937), Kay Irvin wrote that "Agatha Christie can be depended upon to tell a good tale. Even when she is not doing her most brilliant work she holds her reader's attention, leads them on from clue to clue, and from error to error, until they come up with a smash against surprise in the end. She is not doing her most brilliant work in Poirot Loses A Client, but she has produced a much-better-than-average thriller nevertheless, and her plot has novelty, as it has sound mechanism, intriguing character types, and ingenuity.

In The Observer's issue of 18 July 1937, "Torquemada" (Edward Powys Mathers) said, "usually after reading a Poirot story the reviewer begins to scheme for space in which to deal with it adequately; but Dumb Witness, the least of all the Poirot books, does not have this effect on me, though my sincere admiration for Agatha Christie is almost notorious. Apart from a certain baldness of plot and crudeness of characterisation on which this author seemed to have outgrown years ago, and apart from the fact that her quite pleasing dog has no testimony to give either way concerning the real as opposed to the attempted murder, her latest book betrays two main defects. In the first place, on receiving a delayed letter from a dead old lady Poirot blindly follows a little grey hunch. In the second place, it is all very well for Hastings not to see the significance of the brooch in the mirror, but for Poirot to miss it for so long is almost an affront to the would-be worshipper. Still, better a bad Christie than a good average."

The Scotsman of 5 July 1937 started off with: "In Agatha Christie's novel there is a minor question of construction which might be raised." The reviewer then went on to outline the set-up of the plot up to the point where Poirot receives Emily Arundell's letter and then said, "Why should the story not have begun at this point? M. Poirot reconstructs it from here and the reader would probably have got more enjoyment out of it if he had not had a hint of the position already. But the detection is good, and the reader has no ground for complaint, for the real clue is dangled before his eyes several times, and because it seems a normal feature of another phenomenon than poisoning that he tends to ignore it. For this Agatha Christie deserves full marks."

E. R. Punshon of The Guardian began his review column of 13 July 1937 by an overview comparison of the books in question that week (in addition to Dumb Witness, I'll be Judge, I'll be Jury by Milward Kennedy, Hamlet, Revenge! by Michael Innes, Dancers in Mourning by Margery Allingham and Careless Corpse by C. Daly King) when he said, "Only Mrs Christie keeps closer to the old tradition, and this time she adds much doggy lore and a terrier so fascinating that even Poirot himself is nearly driven from the centre of the stage." In the review proper, he went on to say that the dedication of the novel to Peter was, "a fact that in this dog-worshipping country is enough of itself to ensure success." He observed that Poirot, "shows all of his usual acumen; Captain Hastings – happily once more at Poirot's side – more than all his usual stupidity, and there is nothing left for the critic but to offer his usual tribute of praise to another of Mrs Christie's successes. She does indeed this sort of thing so superlatively well that one is ungratefully tempted to wish she would do something just a little well different, even if less well."

In the Daily Mirror (8 July 1937), Mary Dell wrote: "Once I had started reading, I did not have to rely on Bob or his cleverness to keep me interested. This is Agatha Christie at her best." She concluded, "Here's a book that will keep all thriller fans happy from page one to page three hundred and something."

Robert Barnard: "Not quite vintage for the period: none of the relations of the dead woman is particularly interesting, and the major clue is very obvious. The doggy stuff is rather embarrassing, though done with affection and knowledge. At the end the dog is given to Hastings – or possibly vice versa."

== References to other works ==
- Chapter 11: "Poirot's travellings in the East, as far as I knew, consisted of one journey to Syria extended to Iraq, and which occupied perhaps a few weeks". After solving a case in Syria by the request of his friend, Poirot decided to travel to Iraq before returning to England and, while in Iraq, was requested to solve a case, which he did and which is told in Christie's 1936 novel Murder in Mesopotamia, after which Poirot returned to Syria and boarded the Orient Express to return home and en route solved the Murder on the Orient Express.
- Chapter 18: Poirot gives a list of murderers from previous cases of his, more precisely Death in the Clouds (1935), The Mysterious Affair at Styles (1920), The Murder of Roger Ackroyd (1926), and The Mystery of the Blue Train (1928).

== Changes in later editions ==
Early editions contained some errata concerning names of the characters.

The son of Bella and Jacob Tanios is mentioned by name by his mother in Chapters 2, 16, 17 and by his father in Chapters 2 and 17 as well. In Chapter 2 he is called "Edward". At the very end of Chapter 16 in early print versions, when Bella, her daughter Mary and Poirot are joined by Jacob Tanios and their son, Poirot asks Bella a question and she replies: "When do you return to Smyrna, madame?" "In a few weeks' time. My husband – ah! here is my husband and John with him." At the start of Chapter 17, Jacob Tanios then calls his son John: "Here we are," he said, smiling to his wife. "John has been passionately thrilled by his first ride in the tube."

Other print versions have even more switches between John and Edward (in Chapter 2 a few sentences apart, for example).

In the audiobook edition read by Hugh Fraser, the boy is always called Edward, even in those two instances where the print version has the wrong name.

Early editions are also inconsistent with regard to Bella Tanios' maiden name. There is an early reference to her as Bella Winter in Chapter 1; later she is referred to as Bella Biggs, daughter of Professor Biggs.

Newer editions of the novel have all name inconsistencies removed.

In the audio book, the title of Chapter 18 is "A Cuckoo in the Nest", changed from "A Nigger in the Woodpile" in early texts. In recent editions of the novel, the title of Chapter 18 is "A Wolf in the Manger".

== History ==
Dumb Witness was based on a short story titled "The Incident of the Dog's Ball". For many years, this short story was kept along with Agatha Christie's other papers in a room at Greenway that came to be known as the so-called "fax room". To add dramatic effect at the time of the story's eventual publication, it was claimed that the story had been thought lost until it was located by the author's daughter in a crate of her personal effects, in 2004. "The Incident of the Dog's Ball" was published in Britain in September 2009 in John Curran's Agatha Christie's Secret Notebooks: Fifty Years of Mysteries in the Making. The short story was also published by The Strand Magazine in their tenth anniversary issue of the revived magazine in 2009.

== Adaptations ==
=== Television ===
==== 1996 Agatha Christie's Poirot ====
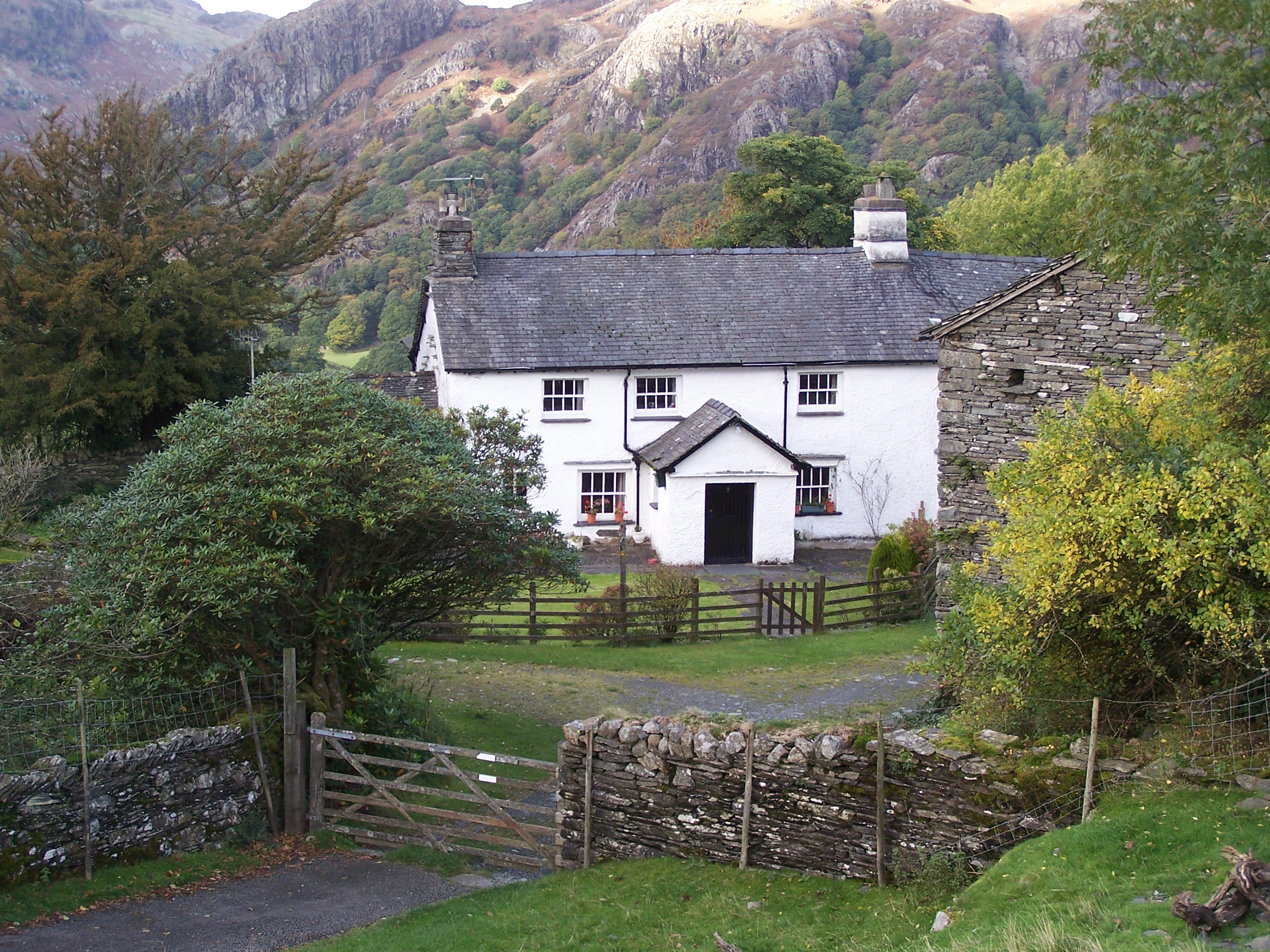
Tarn Hows Cottage, Cumbria, doubled as Teresa Arundell's home in Agatha Christie's Poirot

In 1996 the novel was adapted by Douglas Watkinson as part of the television series Agatha Christie's Poirot, starring David Suchet as Poirot. The adaptation makes a number of plot changes.

The cast includes:

- Hugh Fraser as Hastings
- Ann Morrish as Emily Arundel
- Patrick Ryecart as Charles Arundel
- Kate Buffery as Theresa Arundel
- Paul Herzberg as Jacob Tanios
- Julia St. John as Bella Tanios
- Norma West as Wilhelmina Lawson
- Jonathan Newth as Dr. Grainger
- Pauline Jameson as Isabel Tripp
- Muriel Pavlow as Julia Tripp

==== Les Petits Meurtres d'Agatha Christie ====
In 2013, it was adapted as an episode of the French television series Les Petits Meurtres d'Agatha Christie.

=== Radio ===
BBC Radio 4 broadcast a full cast adaptation of the novel in 2006, featuring John Moffatt as Hercule Poirot and Simon Williams as Captain Arthur Hastings. Music was composed by Tom Smail.

The production was recorded for sale as an audio book on cassette or CD. Three editions of this BBC Radio Full Cast Drama were released in the UK and US markets, the latest being the January 2010 US edition on CD, ISBN 9781602838086.

=== Graphic novel ===
Dumb Witness was released by HarperCollins as a graphic novel adaptation on 6 July 2009, adapted and illustrated by "Marek" (ISBN 0-00-729310-0).

== Publication history ==
- 1937, Collins Crime Club (London), 5 July 1937, Hardcover, 320 pp
- 1938, Dodd Mead and Company (New York), 1937, Hardcover, 302 pp
- 1945, Avon Books, Paperback, 260 pp (Avon number 70)
- 1949, Pan Books, Paperback, 250 pp (Pan number 82)
- 1958, Fontana Books (Imprint of HarperCollins), Paperback, 255 pp
- 1965, Dell Books, Paperback, 252 pp
- 1969, Pan Books, Paperback, 218 pp
- 1973, Ulverscroft Large-print Edition, Hardcover, 454 pp
- 1975, Fontana Books, Paperback, 255 pp
- 2007, Poirot Facsimile Edition (Facsimile of 1937 UK First Edition), HarperCollins, 3 January 2007, Hardback, ISBN 0-00-723446-5

In addition to those listed above, thirteen paperbacks issued from July 1969 (Macmillan UK edition) to June 2011 (William Morrow US edition ISBN 9780062073754) are shown at Fantastic Fiction. The most recent hardback edition was issued in April 2013 for the US market by Center Point ISBN 9781611736830.

The book is in continuous publication, and in several forms. Two Kindle editions have been issued: one in January 2005 by William Morrow Paperbacks (ISBN B000FC2RRM) and again in October 2010 by HarperCollins (ISBN B0046RE5CW). Four audio editions for the UK and US markets are listed, from August 2002, all read by Hugh Fraser by HarperCollins Audiobooks in the UK, and by BBC Audiobooks America and Audio Partners, The Mystery Masters ISBN 9781572705135 February 2006 in the US.

The book was first serialised in the US in The Saturday Evening Post in seven instalments from 7 November (Volume 209, Number 19) to 19 December 1936 (Volume 209, Number 25) under the title Poirot Loses a Client with illustrations by Henry Raleigh.

In the UK, the novel was serialised as an abridged version in the weekly Women's Pictorial magazine in seven instalments from 20 February (Volume 33, Number 841) to 3 April 1937 (Volume 33, Number 847) under the title Mystery of Littlegreen House. There were no chapter divisions and all of the instalments carried illustrations by "Raleigh".
