= The Labours of Hercules =

1947 Poirot short story collection by Agatha Christie

- Dust-jacket illustration of the US (true first) edition. See Publication history (below) for UK first edition jacket image.
- Author: Agatha Christie
- Language: English
- Series: Hercule Poirot
- Genre: Crime novel
- Publisher: Dodd, Mead and Company
- Publication date: 1947
- Publication place: United Kingdom; United States
- Media type: Print (hardback & paperback)
- Pages: 265
- Preceded by: The Hollow
- Followed by: Taken at the Flood

The Labours of Hercules is a short story collection written by the English writer Agatha Christie and first published in the US by Dodd, Mead and Company in 1947 and in the UK by Collins Crime Club in September of the same year. The US edition retailed at $2.50 and the UK edition at eight shillings and sixpence (8/6, 42½p).

It features the Belgian detective Hercule Poirot and gives an account of twelve cases with which he intends to close his career as a private detective. His regular associates (his secretary, Miss Felicity Lemon, and valet, George/Georges) make cameo appearances, as does Chief Inspector Japp. The stories were all first published in periodicals, all but one during 1939 and 1940. (The lone exception was initially published in 1947.)

In the foreword, Poirot declares that he will carefully choose the cases to conform to the mythological sequence of the Twelve Labours of Hercules. In some cases (such as "The Nemean Lion"), the connection is a highly tenuous one, while in others the choice of case is more or less forced upon Poirot by circumstances. By the end, "The Capture of Cerberus" has events that correspond with the twelfth labour with almost self-satirical convenience.

== Plot summaries ==
=== Foreword ===
Hercule Poirot is enjoying a social visit by Dr. Burton, a fellow of All Souls, who recites sonorously some lines from Homer's Iliad (XXIII, 316 f) and turns the conversation round to the subject of Poirot's unusual Christian name and how some of the pagan names parents give to their children do not suit their recipients. He thinks about Poirot's and Sherlock Holmes's mothers sitting together and discussing names for their children. Poirot claims ignorance of the legend of Hercules. The talk turns to Poirot's intention to retire after completing a few cases of interest and personal appeal and Burton laughingly refers to the twelve labours of Hercules. This comment gives Poirot pause for thought and after his visitor has gone, Poirot gets acquainted with the exploits of his legendary namesake, deciding his final cases will mimic Hercules' Twelve Labours.

=== The Nemean Lion ===
Miss Lemon, Poirot's secretary, finds the first of the labours in a letter from a bluff outspoken businessman, Sir Joseph Hoggin, whose wife's Pekingese dog has been kidnapped. Poirot meets Hoggin, who tells him the dog was taken a week ago but returned for a ransom of two hundred pounds. Hoggin would have left the matter there but for the fact that the same thing had happened to an acquaintance at his club. Poirot meets the petulant Lady Hoggin and her put-upon companion, Miss Amy Carnaby, who is clearly frightened of her employer. Miss Carnaby took the yapping dog, Shan-Tung (described by Poirot as "a veritable lion"), for his walk in the park and she stopped to admire a baby in the pram. When she looked down, someone had cut the dog's leash and it had been taken. A ransom note said to leave the money in notes in an envelope for a Captain Curtis at an address in Bloomsbury.

Poirot begins his investigations. Having ascertained the name of Miss Carnaby's previous employer, Lady Hartingfield who died a year before, he visits her niece who confirms Lady Hoggin's view of Miss Carnaby's lack of intellect but essential good qualities, looking after an invalid sister and being good with dogs, so much so that Lady Hartingfield left her Pekingese to her. Poirot interviews the park keeper who remembers the incident of the kidnap. He then investigates the address to which the ransom money was sent and finds it is a cheap hotel where letters are often left for non-residents. His third visit is to the wife of the man that Hoggin met at his club who gives a very similar story to that told by Lady Hoggin as to the method of kidnap and ransom demand. His last visit is back to Sir Joseph to report on progress, where he observes that Sir Joseph's relationship with his blonde secretary is not exactly on a professional level.

Poirot sends his valet out investigating and finds an address which confirms Poirot's suspicions of where it would be and what he would find there. Poirot visits it and finds Miss Carnaby, her invalid sister, Emily, and a Pekingese dog, Augustus. They are part of a scam run by women who are companions to rich and ungrateful ladies. These women are poorly paid, without talent and will be cast adrift when they get older. The dog that is taken out for a walk is their own, Augustus, who is let off his lead and is able to find his way back to the sister's flat unaided, thus providing witnesses to the "crime". The "subject" of the kidnap is held at the sister's flat and its owner told of the ransom. Quite often it is the companion who is sent with the envelope of pound notes which goes into a general pool for all the companions involved in the scheme. Miss Carnaby feels guilty for her crime but excuses it on the basis of the way they are treated by their employers – only the other day Lady Hoggin accused her of tampering with her tonic as it tasted unpleasant. Poirot tells them their activities must stop and that the money must be returned to Lady Hoggin, although he is sure that he will be able to persuade her husband not to involve the police.

Poirot meets Sir Joseph and offers two alternatives: prosecute the criminal (whom he does not name), in which case he will lose his money, or just take the money and call the case closed. The greedy Sir Joseph agrees to the latter option and takes Poirot's cheque. The detective turns the conversation round to murder cases and tells a rattled Sir Joseph that he reminds him of a Belgian murderer who poisoned his wife to marry his secretary. Poirot's meaning is quite clear and the shaken man gives Poirot his cheque back, telling him to keep the money. Poirot sends it back to the Misses Carnaby, telling them that it is the final contribution to their fund before it is wound up. Meanwhile, Lady Hoggin tells her relieved husband that her tonic no longer tastes so bitter.

=== The Lernaean Hydra ===
Poirot is asked for help by a physician, Dr Charles Oldfield, who has a practice in Market Loughborough, a small village in Berkshire. His wife died just over a year ago and the malicious talk in the village is that he poisoned her. People are avoiding him and several poison pen letters have been sent to him but he can do nothing to stem this tide of ill-intentioned gossip – like the heads of the Lernaean Hydra, when one source of the gossip is cut off, another grows in its place. So, his ultimate aim is to cut the main source of the gossip, just like the hydra had been slain by cutting its vulnerable head.

Mrs Oldfield was a difficult invalid whose death was put down to a gastric ulcer, whose symptoms are similar to that of arsenic poisoning. She left her husband a not inconsiderable sum of money and, under pressure, Oldfield admits that a lot of the talk revolves around Jean Moncrieffe, his young dispenser, whom he wants to marry but dares not because of the talk. Poirot travels to Market Loughborough and meets Jean. She is frank about her relationship with Oldfield and her dislike of his wife but opposes Poirot's idea of an exhumation and autopsy on the body. Poirot makes the rounds of the village, insinuating that he is connected with the Home Office and thereby generating much hypocritical murmurs of sympathy for the doctor and, more importantly, names of who said what and when.

From this he learns of the present whereabouts of two servants of the Oldfields who left their employ after Mrs Oldfield died; Nurse Harrison, who tended to the patient, and Beatrice, the family maid. Nurse Harrison tells a story of overhearing Jean and the doctor talking about the imminent death of his wife in which it was clear that this was an event that both of them were impatiently awaiting. The nurse is certain that Beatrice must have overheard the talk as well. Poirot tells her of the supposed plans of exhumation and the nurse considers this news and then tells him she agrees that such a thing should be done. While being interviewed, Beatrice slyly denies overhearing any conversation but tells him of several suspicious stories of Jean making medicine or a pot of tea for Mrs Oldfield which the nurse poured away or changed before the patient could take them.

Poirot does obtain permission for an exhumation and the body is proved to be riddled with arsenic. Nurse Harrison is shocked and tells Poirot a new story of seeing Jean filling up a make-up compact with a powder from the dispensary. Poirot alerts the police who find such a compact in the bureau of the bedroom of Jean's lodgings. They show it to Nurse Harrison who excitedly confirms that is the one she saw – only for Poirot to tell her that such compacts have only been manufactured for three months. Further, his valet, George, followed her some days previously, witnessing her purchase of a compact at Woolworths and then seeing her travel to Jean's lodgings to secrete it there. Trapped and broken, Nurse Harrison admits the murder.

Poirot speaks to Jean and tells her that the conversation Nurse Harrison claimed to have overheard seemed psychologically unlikely as two possible conspirators would never have had such a conversation in a place where they could have been overheard. He observed the nurse's positive reaction when he told her of a possible exhumation and then had her followed by George, who witnessed her buying the compact and laying the trap for Jean. The motive was jealousy, as Nurse Harrison was convinced by Oldfield's kind manner over several years that he intended her to be his bride.

=== The Arcadian Deer ===
Poirot is diverted to stay in an English village inn when his chauffeur-driven car breaks down. Although he does not appreciate the badly-cooked meal he is served, he does enjoy relaxing in front of the fire in his room after his walk through the snow to reach the establishment. He is interrupted by the mechanic who is trying to repair the car. The young man – Ted Williamson – is impossibly handsome and well-built, like a Greek god, and Poirot is reminded of a shepherd in Arcady. Williamson knows of Poirot's reputation and asks him to trace a young girl who has disappeared.

The previous June, Williamson was called out to a large house nearby called Grasslawn to repair a broken radio. The house owners and their guests were out boating and he was shown in by the maid to a Russian ballet dancer who was staying there. The golden-haired maid was called Nita and Williamson fell for her. He went out for a walk with her and she said she would be back with her mistress in two weeks time and would see him again but when the time had come for their second meeting, the maid was different. The new maid, Marie Hellin, gave him an address in North London to write to contact Nita, but his letter came back unanswered.

Poirot visits this address and is told that the girl, an Italian, had returned to her home country. She is described by the landlady as dark-eyed and bad-tempered. Poirot tries to trace Nita through her former employer, Katrina Samoushenka, but is told that the dancer has gone to Switzerland. He also speaks with the owner of Grasslawn, Sir George Sanderfield, who remembers Marie, with some unease, but does not recall a maid on the first occasion of Madame Samoushenka's visit to his house, and thinks Poirot is mistaken. Marie is the subject of Poirot's next visit. She was employed in the last week of June when the previous maid had left, possibly due to illness. She hints that she knows something of Sir George that Poirot would like to know, but the detective does not take up the offer, much to her annoyance.

Poirot speaks to his contact in the theatre world who tells him the dancer has gone to Vagray Les Alpes in Switzerland, suffering from tuberculosis, and that her maid was an Italian from Pisa. Poirot travels to Pisa to find from her family that Nita Valetta, whom they call Bianca, had had appendicitis and had died on the operating table. Poirot has seemingly reached the end of his quest, but something troubles him and he moves on to Switzerland where he finds Samoushenka in poor health.

She confirms Poirot's suspicions that Marie Hellin was blackmailing Sir George Sanderfield, and that Marie's predecessor, Nita, has died. Poirot points out that Nita's family called her Bianca. He notices Katrina's golden hair and puts it to her that on the visit to Sanderfield's house in June, she was between maids – Bianca had left and Marie had not yet been employed. Samoushenka was, in fact, Nita, or "Incognita" to give her a full name, and she enjoyed several hours of pleasure in Arcady with her Greek god when he called at the house and the others were out. She does not deny his story. Then, he persuades Katrina to start a new life with Williamson. His quest for the Arcadian deer is at an end.

=== The Erymanthian Boar ===
Poirot is still in Switzerland after solving the third labour. Sightseeing, he takes a funicular to the mountain-top hotel of Rochers Neiges. On the way up, his ticket is checked by a conductor who passes him a hurriedly scribbled note that is from Lementeuil, the Swiss Commissaire of Police. It tells Poirot that he has been recognised because of his moustache and asks for his help. Marrascaud, a Parisian gangster, has fled from his homeland after the killing of Salley, a bookmaker, and is believed from information received to be having a rendezvous with members of his gang at Rochers Neiges. Poirot considers the note; Marrascaud has been the prime suspect in many killings but this is the first time that his guilt is beyond doubt. Although he is annoyed that his holiday is being delayed, the phrase used by Lementeuil to describe Marrascaud – "a wild boar" – catches his interest. He sees in this the fourth of his self-imposed labours.

Poirot observes his fellow passengers in the funicular. There is a friendly American tourist called Mr Schwartz, a beautiful but melancholy woman, a distinguished-looking man reading a book in German and three criminal types playing cards. Arriving at the hotel, they find it somewhat in chaos as it is only just opening at the start of the season. To Poirot, the hotel manager seems in too much of a nervous panic; the only efficient person is Gustave, the waiter. Talking to the manager and then to Schwartz again, Poirot learns that the beautiful woman is a Madame Grandier, who comes each year on the anniversary of her husband's death in the area, and that the distinguished-looking man is Dr Lutz, a Jewish refugee from the Nazis in Vienna. Poirot introduces himself to Schwartz as Monsieur Poirier, a silk merchant from Lyon.

The next morning, when delivering coffee to his room, Gustave tells Poirot that in fact he is M. Drouet, a police inspector. They are now cut off in the hotel as the funicular has been damaged during the night, probably by sabotage. Poirot and Gustave discuss who Marrascaud could be among the guests and staff, which includes Jacques, the cook's husband. Poirot is intrigued as to why a rendezvous has been arranged in such an isolated place.

Poirot speaks to Jacques and his wife and discovers that before Gustave, there was another waiter called Robert, who was dismissed for incompetence but who was not witnessed leaving the hotel. That night, the three card-playing men attack Poirot in his room, but he is saved by the pistol-carrying Schwartz. The three men are locked up and Schwartz tells Poirot that the men have already "carved up" Gustave's face. Schwartz and Poirot find Dr Lutz attending the not too seriously injured detective, and then follow a bloody trail down the carpets of the hotel to an unused wing where they find a dead body with a note pinned to it which reads "Marrascaud will kill no more, nor will he rob his friends." Poirot uses a heliograph to signal down the mountain for help. Three days later, Lementeuil and some officers arrive at the hotel and Gustave is arrested.

Poirot announces that Gustave is not Drouet but Marrascaud. It was "Robert" who was Drouet; Marrascaud killed him and took his place. We learn that during his first night in the hotel, Poirot did not drink his coffee, as he suspected it was drugged, and actually witnessed Gustave entering his room, rifling his pockets, and finding the note from Lementeuil. The three card players were members of Marrascaud's gang but never attacked their leader; the carve-up of Marrascaud's face was carried out by Dr Lutz (who is a plastic surgeon and not a psychiatrist as he has pretended) to change his appearance. This is the real reason the rendezvous took place in such an isolated spot.

=== The Augean Stables ===
Poirot is asked to help the prime minister, Edward Ferrier, whose predecessor in the role was his father-in-law John Hammett, now Lord Cornworthy. He was held up as an exemplary role model as to what an honest and honourable politician should be. However, beneath the surface he was involved in chicanery, dishonest share-dealing and misusing party funds. These revelations have come as a shock to his son-in-law who forced Hammett to resign on the grounds of ill-health and then took up the post himself. The revelations are about to be revealed to the public by a scandal sheet of a newspaper called The X-Ray News when Ferrier is attempting to clean up public life.

Poirot is uninterested until the Home Secretary, Sir George Conway, uses the phrase "The Augean Stables" at which point he agrees to assist. Poirot visits Percy Perry, the seedy editor of The X-Ray News who he has heard has previously accepted sums of money for not printing stories. On this occasion, however, Perry refuses money and says he will publish.

Soon afterward, along with the stories about Hammett, another series of news reports start to appear in the press which hint at various sex scandals regarding Ferrier's wife, Dagmar. They paint a picture of her as wanton and cavorting at clubs with a South American gigolo. These stories appear in The X-Ray News, which is sued for libel by Mrs Ferrier. The prosecution provides its first witness – the Bishop of Northumbria – who swears that Mrs Ferrier was at his palace recovering on doctor's orders on the dates mentioned by the newspaper. The second witness is a lady called Thelma Anderson who states that she was approached by a man who said he worked for The X-Ray News and employed her to impersonate Mrs Ferrier. She was then photographed in various compromising situations.

Mrs Ferrier wins her libel case easily and in doing so makes the public assume the rumours about Hammett were also fabricated. Poirot reveals to an astonished Ferrier that the idea to use Thelma Anderson was his and that Dagmar was in on the plan. The idea came from Alexandre Dumas, père's book, The Queen's Necklace, but the real inspiration was "The Augean Stables" when Hercules uses a force of nature – in his case a river – to clean the stables out. Poirot used sex as the force of nature, first blackening Mrs Ferrier's name and then clearing her in a public fashion, resulting in a wave of sympathy which also reflected well on her father and destroyed The X-Ray News.

=== The Stymphalean Birds ===
Harold Waring, an under-secretary of state at age 30, is enjoying a holiday in the country of Herzoslovakia at a hotel by the side of Lake Stempka. The only other English people there are an elderly woman, Mrs Rice, and her married daughter, Mrs Elsie Clayton. Two other guests, older women, cause Harold a moment of disquiet when he first sees them as they come up a path from the lake to the hotel: they are dressed in flapping cloaks, have hooked noses, expressionless faces, and bring to Harold's mind an image of birds of ill omen.

Chatting to Mrs Rice, Harold finds out that her daughter is not widowed, as he had supposed, but is in an abusive marriage. Her husband, Philip, drinks, is insanely jealous and has a vicious temper. Her daughter's peace of mind is slowly being destroyed by this relationship. Mrs Rice has also found out from the hotel concierge that the two evil-looking women are Polish sisters.

One morning, Harold finds Elsie sitting on a log in the woods, crying about the state of her life. He comforts her and, as he escorts her back to the hotel, they come across one of the Polish women. He wonders how much she saw. That evening, Elsie bursts into Harold's room. Her husband has arrived at the hotel unexpectedly and is in a terrible rage. At that moment, Philip Clayton runs in. He is carrying a spanner and screams at Elsie, accusing her of having an affair just as one of the Polish women had told him. He chases Elsie out of Harold's room and back to her own. Harold runs after him and is in time to see Elsie throw a paperweight at her husband in self-defence. He falls to the ground and Elsie begs Harold to leave them before he gets himself into trouble. Half an hour later, Mrs Rice joins Harold and tells him that Philip is dead, killed by the blow.

Harold is aghast, worried if the foreign police will believe the story both he and Elsie have to tell and that their "relationship" is innocent. The evidence points to manslaughter at best and murder at worst. Mrs Rice suddenly has an idea and wonders if the hotel management and the police are open to bribery. Harold agrees to give it a try and wires for money but, apart from that, and unable to speak the local language, he leaves Mrs Rice to carry out the negotiations. All seems to go well and the next day Harold sees Mrs Rice speaking with a police officer and she tells him that the death has been declared as being from natural causes and that they are all in the clear. That is until the two Polish women approach Mrs Rice and speak to her. She translates for Harold and tells him that they know what really happened (their room being next to Elsie's) and that they are blackmailing the English people.

Harold is walking by the lake when he encounters Poirot. Desperate, he confesses what has happened. Poirot sees an immediate link between the two Polish women and the Stymphalean Birds. Poirot promises to help; the next morning, he informs Harold that he has been successful, and that the blackmailers have been dealt with. He found out by telegram that they were wanted by the police and that they have been arrested. Harold is relieved, but becomes confused upon seeing the two Polish women taking a walk. Poirot tells him that, although not particularly attractive, they are of good family and background. The true culprits are Mrs Rice and her daughter. "Philip Clayton" never existed; the man Harold saw "killed" was Mrs Rice in disguise. No foreign police are open to bribery in the way that Harold was told. He provided all the money and was innocent of what Mrs Rice "negotiated" as he did not speak the language. Harold resolves to learn every European language from now onwards.

=== The Cretan Bull ===
Poirot is asked for assistance by a young lady, Diana Maberly. She was engaged to marry Hugh Chandler for over a year but he has broken it off as he thinks he is going mad. There is a history of insanity in the family, with his grandfather and a great aunt being afflicted, and his father, Admiral Chandler, has insisted his son leave the Navy before his condition worsens, but the reason was hidden under the pretext of having to manage the family country estate – a reason no one believed, including Colonel Frobisher, a family friend and Hugh's godfather. At Poirot's prompting, Diana admits that there have been some unusual occurrences on nearby farms with the throats of sheep cut and the like but insists it has nothing to do with the situation. The Admiral refuses to let a doctor see his son.

Poirot travels with Diana to the family seat of Lyde Manor where he meets the people involved. Hugh strikes Poirot as a fine young bull of a man. He learns further details of the history of insanity in the family from Colonel Frobisher, including Hugh's grandfather who was committed to an asylum. Poirot learns that Hugh's mother died when he was ten years old in a boating accident when she was out with the Admiral, and that she was previously engaged to Frobisher before he went off to India with the British Army. When he came home, he learned she had married Admiral Chandler; however, this incident did nothing to lessen the ties of friendship between the two men.

Poirot forces Frobisher to tell him more details of the incident with the sheep and finds out that on the night concerned, the Admiral found his son in bed with blood on his clothes and in the washbasin but Hugh remembered nothing of what he had done. Poirot questions the Admiral who has aged immensely since these incidents started and who feels that breaking the engagement is best for everyone, remarking that there will be no more Chandlers at Lyde Manor after he and his son have died.

In questioning Hugh, Poirot hears of his dreams which always seem to include elements of hydrophobia. He also has hallucinations and has one while speaking to Poirot of seeing a skeletal figure in the garden. Poirot, however, is convinced that Hugh is sane and begins his investigations, asking Diana to arrange for him to spend the night in the manor. He searches Hugh's room and also makes a trip to a local chemist, supposedly to buy a toothbrush.

That night, Hugh somehow manages to get out of his locked room and is found outside Diana's room, a bloodied knife in his hands from having killed a cat. Hugh recovers consciousness, is shocked to hear what has happened and tells the others that he intends to go out shooting rabbits. It is clear that his real intention is to commit suicide in the woods with a shotgun and therefore save himself and the others from further pain. Poirot stops him and tells them all that Hugh is being set up to kill himself.

The culprit decided to use the Admiral's atropine eyedrops to induce madness in Hugh, inspired by Frobisher's accounts of datura poisoning in India. The atropine was mixed into Hugh's shaving cream so that it could be absorbed through his skin, causing hallucinations and intense thirst, and the culprit killed the animals and planted evidence to frame him. Poirot accuses the Admiral of being responsible; he had discovered that Hugh was actually Frobisher's son, caused the drowning to punish Mrs Chandler for her infidelity, and conceived the plot to eliminate Hugh. The Admiral, suffering from the family's hereditary madness, had prevented Hugh from seeing a doctor because an examination would have confirmed his sanity. Poirot had verified his theory by having the chemist test a sample of Hugh's shaving cream and noting his and Frobisher's similar mannerisms.

The Admiral scoffs at Poirot's explanation, then takes Hugh's shotgun and goes into the woods to hunt rabbits. A shot is heard shortly after.

=== The Horses of Diomedes ===
One night, Poirot is telephoned for help by a young medical acquaintance, Dr Michael Stoddart. Going to the address given to him, Poirot finds Stoddart in the flat of Mrs Patience Grace, where a debauched party is ending, including use of cocaine. Stoddart had been summoned after Mrs Grace had an argument with her boyfriend, Anthony Hawker. She tried to shoot him as he left the flat, and inflicted a flesh wound on a passing tramp. Stoddart patched up the tramp who has accepted a pay-off.

Stoddart's concern is for Sheila Grant, who he met at a hunt ball in the country. Sheila was at the party, is still at the flat having just woken up and is feeling terrible after the high of the drugs. She is one of four daughters of a retired general and there is every sign that Sheila and her sisters are going wild, getting into a bad set where the cocaine flows freely. Stoddart lectures her about the cocaine and Poirot introduces himself. It is obvious that Sheila has heard of him and is nervous of him. Poirot compares drug-peddling to feeding on human flesh (in his mind, like the horses of Diomedes, who were fed on human flesh).

Poirot visits Mertonshire, where an old friend, Lady Carmichael, gives him details of the Grant family. All the girls are going to the bad as their father cannot control them. They keep company with Hawker, who has an unpleasant reputation, as does another of his "lady friends", Mrs Larkin. Lady Carmichael is thrilled to think that Poirot has visited to investigate some special crime but the detective tells her he is simply there to tame four wild horses. He visits General Grant, whose house is filled with artifacts from India. The General himself completes the clichéd picture, sitting in an armchair with his foot bandaged up from gout, drinking port and railing against the world. Poirot breaks the news of the drugs and listens to the old man's cries of anger and sworn threats against whoever is leading his girls into trouble. Leaving the room, Poirot clumsily trips against his host.

Poirot has himself invited to a party at Mrs Larkin's home where he meets Sheila's sister Pamela. Hawker arrives with Sheila, having just come from a hunt, wanting to fill up his liquor flask. Sheila has heard from one of the house servants that Poirot visited her father the day before. He tells her of the threat she is under from her drug taking. As he leaves he hears Pam whisper to Sheila about the flask. Poirot sees the abandoned flask and finds it full of white powder.

Some time later, back at Lady Carmichael's, Poirot tells Sheila that her photograph has been identified by the police. Her real name is Sheila Kelly. The four girls are not the daughters of General Grant, who is not a general, but head of a drugs ring, and the four young women push the drugs for him. He tells an astonished Michael that the "General" overdid his act, as gout is usually suffered by very old men, not the middle-aged fathers of young women. When Poirot tripped deliberately, he bumped Grant's "gouty" foot, but Grant did not notice. Hawker was not a pusher of drugs but a user. Pam and Sheila were trying to frame him on Grant's orders with the flask of cocaine.

Poirot persuades Sheila to give evidence against Grant and thereby smash the ring. By doing so, she will copy the horses of the legend, who became normal after Hercules fed their master to them. Poirot tells an embarrassed Stoddart that Sheila is certain to lose her criminal tendencies with him to look after her.

=== The Girdle of Hippolyta ===
Alexander Simpson asks Poirot to help in the investigation of a painting by Rubens which was stolen from the gallery that he owns. A group of unemployed men were paid to carry out a demonstration in the gallery which, once it was cleared by the police, was found to have been a diversion to enable the picture to be cut out of its frame. Simpson knows the picture is being transported to France, where it will be bought by his rival in the art collecting world; he suspects Poirot will be more adept at dealing with an unscrupulous rich man than the police will be.

Poirot reluctantly agrees to help. He is far more interested in a case that Japp has about Winnie King, a fifteen-year-old English girl who was being escorted to Paris as one of a party of such girls for the new term at Miss Pope's exclusive school there. On the way back from the dining car of the train, just after it left Amiens (the last stop before Paris), Winnie King went into the toilet and seemingly vanished. No body has been found by the side of the tracks and the train made no other stops, only slowing down for a signal. However, Winnie's hat was later recovered near the tracks. Poirot asks if her shoes have been found.

Some time later, Japp phones Poirot and tells him Winnie has been found about 15 mi (24 km) from Amiens. She is in a daze, has been doped according to the doctor who examined her, and is unable to remember much after setting off from her home town of Cranchester. She remembers nothing of meeting one of Miss Pope's staff, Miss Burshaw, in London before the trip to France. Despite the girl being found, Poirot speaks with Detective Inspector Hearn, who has been dealing with the case and is no nearer to solving the mystery of how the girl disappeared. The only other people in the carriage seemed clear of suspicion – two middle-aged spinsters, two French commercial travellers from Lyon, a young man called James Elliot and his flashy wife, and an American lady about whom very little is known. He is able to confirm that Winnie's shoes were found by the rail line which confirms Poirot's theory.

Poirot goes to France and visits Miss Pope's establishment at Neuilly. The formidable headmistress tells Poirot of the advantages of her school being close to the music and culture of Paris. He hears how two sets of Parisian police asked to search through Winnie's trunk, neither seemingly having spoken to the other, and sees a badly painted picture in oils depicting the bridge at Cranchester, executed by Winnie as a present for Miss Pope. In front of the startled woman, Poirot begins to scrub the picture with turpentine whilst telling her that Winnie never made the trip across to France.

Miss Burshaw met a girl in London whom she had never seen before, and who then totally changed her appearance in the toilette on the train, discarding the schoolgirl hat and shoes through the window and transforming herself into the flashy wife of James Elliot. At the same time, Poirot has stripped away Winnie's "dreadful" painting to expose a second one beneath it: the Girdle of Hippolyta, the missing Rubens masterpiece.

The thieves smuggled the painting in an escorted schoolgirl's trunk, knowing such a thing would never be searched by customs, and one of the gang then threw off her disguise of a plain schoolgirl. Other members of the gang, disguised as policemen, could search the trunk later and retrieve the painting. They did not know that Miss Pope, who insisted on trunks being unpacked upon arrival, would find the "present" and take possession of it immediately. When Poirot leaves, the girls swarm around him asking for his autograph, which Poirot refers to as the attack by the Amazons.

=== The Flock of Geryon ===
Poirot is reacquainted with Miss Carnaby, the companion from the episode of the Nemean Lion, whom Poirot praises as one of the most successful criminals he has ever met. She is worried as she constantly thinks of illegal schemes which she is sure would work and she fears she is turning into a hardened criminal. She wants to put her talents to good use and assist Poirot in fighting crime in any way she can. She also has brought to him a possible case in which she can prove herself.

She has a friend, Mrs Emmeline Clegg, a widow who is comfortably off. In her loneliness, Mrs Clegg has found comfort in a religious sect called "The Flock of the Shepherd", based in a retreat in Devon. Their leader, Dr Andersen, is a handsome, charismatic man. Mrs Clegg has made a will leaving all of her property to the Flock. Miss Carnaby is especially concerned as she knows of three women in a similar situation who have all died within the past year. She has investigated and found nothing unusual in the deaths, all of which were due to natural causes and none of them happened within the sanctuary but at the homes of the deceased. Poirot asks Miss Carnaby to infiltrate the sect. She is to pretend to be dismissive of them and then, once within the sanctuary, be persuaded to be a convert.

Poirot consults Japp. The Scotland Yard detective finds out that Andersen is a German chemist, expelled from a university there by the Nazis because he had a Jewish mother and that there is nothing suspicious about the deaths of the women whose names have been supplied by Miss Carnaby. Nevertheless, Poirot views Andersen as the monster Geryon whom he is determined to destroy. Miss Carnaby settles down at the sanctuary with Mrs Clegg and joins in a festival held at night – "The Full Growth of the Pasture". At the service, she is dismissive of the liturgy but suddenly feels a needle-prick in her arm. Almost instantly she starts to experience a feeling of well-being and euphoria which makes her sleep for a short while.

Poirot instructs her to tell Andersen that she is going to come into a large sum of money that she will leave to the Flock, that she has problems with her lungs, and that Mrs Clegg will soon inherit a large sum from an aunt, more than her present estate. Poirot also asks if she has met a Mr Cole at the sanctuary. Miss Carnaby has and to her he is a very strange man. As if to prove her assertion correct, soon afterwards Mr Cole accosts Miss Carnaby with tales of his strange visions which involve virgin sacrifices, Jehovah and even Odin. She is saved from further strange tales by the arrival of Mr Lipscombe, the lodge-keeper of the Devonshire estate.

The day before the next divine service, Miss Carnaby meets Poirot in a local teashop. She seems to have had an about-face and tells Poirot that Andersen is a great man and that she cannot betray him. She rushes out of the shop and Poirot sees that a surly-looking man has been listening in to their conversation. The next service is proceeding and Miss Carnaby is about to be injected again when Mr Cole steps in. There is a fight and the police pour into the room. Mr Cole is in fact Detective Inspector Cole and he arrests Andersen.

Later the parties confer. The man in the teashop was Mr Lipscombe and when Miss Carnaby recognised him, she put on an act of allegiance to Andersen. Poirot realised this when he had the man followed back to the lodge. Andersen's chemistry background (although he was probably not a Jewish refugee) came in useful for preparing injections of hashish to produce ecstasy in his adherents, and also for injecting them with relevant bacteria when he wanted to kill them and inherit their estates. Andersen was about to inject Miss Carnaby with tuberculosis bacteria to tie in with the fictional ailment she told him about. The proof has been obtained in the laboratory in the sanctuary that the police have raided.

=== The Apples of the Hesperides ===
Poirot receives a visit from Emery Power, a rich art collector of Irish birth. Ten years ago he purchased at auction a gold goblet which was supposedly made for Pope Alexander VI by Benvenuto Cellini, which the Borgia Pope used to poison his victims. The design of the goblet is a coiled serpent, surrounding a tree bearing apples represented by emeralds. Poirot is immediately interested at the mention of apples. Power paid a sum equal to thirty thousand pounds to buy it at auction in 1929, but on the night of the sale the goblet and other items were stolen from the home of the seller, the Marchese di San Veratrino.

The police at the time were certain that a gang of three international thieves were responsible. Two of the men were captured and some of the stolen items recovered but the goblet was not among them. A third man, an Irish cat burglar called Patrick Casey, died soon afterwards when he fell from a building attempting another crime. The Marchese had offered to refund Power's money, but Power did not want to take advantage of this offer, as he would no longer be the legal owner of the goblet if he did. Power had spent the last ten years trying to prove that the real criminal was Sir Reuben Rosenthal, who was his rival bidder at the auction in 1929; however, the two men recently became business allies, and Power is now convinced Rosenthal is innocent.

Poirot takes up the commission and interviews the detective on the case, Inspector Wagstaffe, about the suspects. Patrick Casey's wife, a strict Catholic, is dead. His daughter is a nun in a convent, and his son, who took after his father, is in jail in the United States. There are many leads connected with the gang which stretch all over the world, and Poirot sets his inquiries in motion.

Three months later, Poirot goes to visit the convent which Casey's daughter entered, in a remote part of the western coast of Ireland. He discovers that she had died two months earlier. Poirot convinces one of the locals to help him break into the convent, where he finds and recovers the goblet. He returns it to Power, and tells him that the nuns were using it as a chalice. Casey's daughter had taken it there to atone for her father's sins; the nuns were ignorant of its ownership and ancient history. Poirot had realized that, as there had been no trace or even rumor of the goblet whatsoever for more than ten years, it was likely somewhere where "ordinary material values did not apply". The mention of Casey's daughter being a nun supplied the obvious place.

Poirot shows Power how, during the Renaissance, the Pope used a hidden mechanism in the goblet to put poison into his victim's drinks. Poirot suggests no good will come of owning an object with such an evil history; if it is given back to the convent, the nuns will say masses for Power's soul. Poirot also reminds Power of his boyhood in western Ireland. Power agrees; he has got what he wants, which was to own the goblet. Poirot returns the goblet to the convent, calling it the gift of a man "so unhappy he does not know he is unhappy".

=== The Capture of Cerberus ===
Poirot is leaving the London Underground at Piccadilly Circus when he passes an old acquaintance, the Countess Vera Rossakoff, on the escalators, going in the opposite direction. She insists that they meet and when asked to suggest a place, responds "In Hell...!" Poirot is puzzled by this, until his secretary Miss Felicity Lemon reveals it is the name of a new and prosperous London nightclub. She books him a table for that night.

The luxurious club is in a basement, and is decorated to represent different cultures' ideas of hell or the underworld. The Countess' giant black dog Dou-dou is stationed at the club's entrance, to represent Cerberus. Rossakoff introduces Poirot to Professor Liskeard, who advised her on the decorations (although he is ashamed of the gaudy results), and to Dr Alice Cunningham, a practitioner of psychology who is engaged to Rossakoff's son, currently working in America.

Alice and Poirot do not get along. She is coldly interested in criminal tendencies and finds Rossakoff's kleptomania interesting, but to Poirot's chagrin, she does not seem at all interested in the legendary detective. He questions her decision to wear a heavy coat and pocketed skirt indoors, instead of lighter and more feminine clothing, which further irritates her. However, Alice does find an individual called Paul Varesco fascinating. He is a good-looking lounge lizard with a very dubious reputation, and she spends time dancing with him, questioning him incessantly about incidents in his childhood which could have contributed to his personality.

Before he leaves the club, Poirot recognizes a young Scotland Yard detective in evening dress. The next day, Poirot questions Chief Inspector Japp and learns the club is being watched by the police, as they have linked it to a drugs ring. They cannot trace the person who put up the money to buy the club, but they do know the drugs are being paid for by jewellery. Rich ladies swap their stones for paste imitations and drugs, later denying they knew of the substitution when they contact the police and their insurance companies. Scotland Yard has traced the work done on the jewels to a company called Golconda, and from there to Paul Varesco. The police raid the club, but are unable to find any jewels or drugs either in the club or on any individual within it. They are fortunate to pick up a wanted murderer by chance during the raid, which keeps the drug ring from realizing the raid's true purpose.

Poirot questions Rossakoff about the true owner of the club. She denies that anyone else is the owner, but she is horrified to be told of its potential drug connection. Japp tells Poirot of another plan to raid the club, and Poirot makes his own arrangements. On the night of the raid, Poirot stations a small man called Higgs outside the club.

The morning after the raid, Japp phones Poirot to tell him they found jewels in the pocket of Professor Liskeard, but that he had obviously been set up. However, no drugs were discovered, so someone must have removed them from the club. Poirot tells the astonished Japp that he removed the drugs himself.

Rossakoff arrives at Poirot's flat. She happily confesses to Poirot that she hastily put the jewels in the professor's pocket as it was the nearest to her; she had found them in her own bag when the raid started, and realized Varesco planted them on her to frame her. She also admits that Varesco is the true owner of the premises.

Poirot takes her into the next room, where Higgs and Dou-dou are waiting. Higgs is a skilled dog handler, and Poirot had hired him to briefly 'kidnap' the dog during the raid. Poirot asks Rossakoff to order the dog, who mostly follows Russian commands, to drop what it is holding in its mouth; when she does, the dog releases a small sealed packet of cocaine. A shocked Rossakoff proclaims her innocence, and Poirot reassures her he knows that the true criminal is Alice, who is in league with Verasco. She carried the drugs in her large skirt pockets, and dropped them into her clients' pockets on the dance floor. When the raid occurred and the lights went out, Poirot was waiting by the club entrance, and heard Alice put the packet in the dog's mouth - she had secretly trained Dou-dou to carry items for her in case of a raid. Poirot took the opportunity to cut off a sample of cloth from Alice's sleeve as proof.

Japp arrives to take charge of the drugs, unwittingly interrupting a kiss between Poirot and Rossakoff; the latter flees by the back entrance before Japp can find her there.

== Literary significance and reception ==
Maurice Richardson, in the 5 October 1947 issue of The Observer, wrote briefly:

the Queen of Crime tries the difficult, unrewarding sprint form. The Labours of Hercules consists of twelve Poirot cases, neatly constructed but inevitably lacking the criss-cross of red-herring trails that make our arteries pulse over the full distance. But will Agatha Christie allow the little egg-headed egomaniac to carry out his frightful threat of retirement?

An unnamed reviewer in the Toronto Daily Star on 6 December 1947 wrote,

Hercule Poirot... here emulates his Olympian namesake, Hercules... As the old-timer tackled the 12 classical labors... so Mrs. Christie turns her dapper sleuth loose on 12 modern counterparts in the detection-mystery line. A tricky task, neatly done.

Robert Barnard, in A Talent to Deceive: An Appreciation of Agatha Christie, wrote:

Probably the best single short-story collection, because more varied in its problems and lighter in its touch than usual. Lots of tricks from her novels, and other people's used very skilfully. But the mention of the goblet made by Cellini for Alexander VI (before the age of three?) is a good example of Christie slapdash, almost amounting to philistinism or contempt for her audience.

== Adaptation ==
The Labours of Hercules was adapted into a TV film by Guy Andrews with David Suchet as Poirot as part of the final series of Agatha Christie's Poirot. The adaptation combined "The Arcadian Deer", "The Erymanthian Boar", "The Stymphalean Birds", "The Girdle of Hippolyta" and "The Capture of Cerberus" into one mystery, with "Boar" being the central one. The plots of "Deer" and "Birds" are included fairly faithfully, while only elements from the others are present. "The Lemesurier Inheritance'", the only Poirot short story not previously adapted by the series, was also referenced in this adaptation. It was first broadcast on ITV on 6 November 2013 and then on the Acorn TV website on 18 August 2014.

Unlike in the novel, the titular Labours are not undertaken by Poirot as cases, but rather refer to a series of paintings that are stolen by Marrascaud, the main villain. The title is also symbolic of Poirot's path to redemption after his plan to snare Marrascaud leads to the senseless murder of an innocent girl, Lucinda LeMesurier. The most significant departure from the source material is the change in Marrascaud's identity. In the book it is Gustave who is Marrascaud, but in the adaptation it is Alice Cunningham (who is Rossakoff's daughter, not her daughter-in-law), with Gustave being her accomplice, along with Dr Lutz.

The adaptation marks the second and final appearance of Countess Vera Rossakoff in this series, played here by Orla Brady. The previous appearance was broadcast in 1991, in the episode "The Double Clue", where Kika Markham played Rossakoff.

Filming for this episode took place in April and May 2013 and was directed by Andy Wilson, who also directed Death on the Nile and Taken at the Flood for the series. Wilson described this adaptation as "a journey of restoration and redemption for Poirot".

The location in this adaptation, a Swiss hotel called "Hotel Olympos", was shot in Halton House in Aylesbury; however, the bedrooms were built at Pinewood studios.

== Publication history ==
- 1947: Dodd Mead and Company (New York), 1947, Hardback, 265 pp
- 1947: Collins Crime Club (London), September 1947, Hardback, 256 pp
- 1951: Dell Books, Paperback, 255 pp
- 1953: Penguin Books, Paperback, (Penguin number 928), 254 pp
- 1961: Fontana Books (Imprint of HarperCollins), Paperback, 256 pp
- 1967: Greenway edition of collected works (William Collins), Hardcover, 319 pp
- 1967: Greenway edition of collected works (Dodd Mead), Hardcover, 319 pp
- 1978: Ulverscroft Large-print Edition, Hardcover, 467 pp; ISBN 0-7089-0119-0

=== First publication of stories ===
First worldwide appearance of a story marked †

The cover of issue 587 of the Strand Magazine (November 1939) which featured the first UK publication of The Nemean Lion

All of the stories except for "The Capture of Cerberus" were first published in the UK in the Strand Magazine with illustrations by Ernest Ratcliff as follows:

- †"The Nemean Lion": November 1939 – issue 587
- "The Lernaean Hydra": December 1939 – issue 588
- "The Arcadian Deer": January 1940 – issue 589
- †"The Erymanthian Boar": February 1940 – issue 590
- †"The Augean Stables": March 1940 – issue 591
- "The Stymphalean Birds": April 1940 – issue 592
- †"The Cretan Bull": May 1940 – issue 593
- †"The Horses of Diomedes": June 1940 – issue 594
- "The Girdle of Hippolyta": July 1940 – issue 595
- "The Flock of Geryon": August 1940 – issue 596
- "The Apples of the Hesperides": September 1940 – 597

"The Capture of Cerberus" was rejected by Strand Magazine and was not published as part of the series. A new story under the same title first appeared in the Collins first edition. The original story surfaced in 2009 in Agatha Christie's Secret Notebooks by John Curran. In the US, nine of the stories were first published in the weekly newspaper supplement This Week magazine in two series of four stories each, plus one later publication as follows:

- †"The Lernaean Hydra": 3 September 1939 under the title Invisible Enemy
- †"The Girdle of Hippolyta": 10 September 1939 under the title The Disappearance of Winnie King
- †"The Stymphalean Birds": 17 September 1939 under the title The Vulture Women with an illustration by C.C. Beall
- †"The Cretan Bull": 24 September 1939 under the title Midnight Madness
- "The Erymanthian Boar": 5 May 1940 under the title Murder Mountain
- †"The Apples of the Hesperides": 12 May 1940 under the title The Poison Cup
- "The Arcadian Deer": 19 May 1940 under the title Vanishing Lady with an illustration by C.C. Beall
- †"The Flock of Geryon": 26 May 1940 under the title Weird Monster
- †"The Capture of Cerberus": 16 March 1947 under the title Meet Me in Hell

In addition, two other stories were first published in the US unillustrated in Ellery Queen's Mystery Magazine as follows:

- "The Nemean Lion": September 1944 (volume 5, number 18) under the title "The Case of the Kidnapped Pekinese"
- "The Horses of Diomedes": January 1945 (volume 6, number 20) under the title "The Case of the Drug Peddler"
