= Taken at the Flood =

1948 Poirot novel by Agatha Christie

- Dust-jacket illustration of the US (true first) edition with alternative title.
- Author: Agatha Christie
- Language: English
- Series: Hercule Poirot
- Genre: Crime novel
- Publisher: Dodd, Mead and Company
- Publication date: March 1948
- Publication place: United Kingdom; United States
- Media type: Print (hardback & paperback)
- Pages: 242 (first edition, hardcover)
- Preceded by: The Labours of Hercules (short stories)
- Followed by: The Under Dog and Other Stories (short stories)

Taken at the Flood is a mystery novel by British writer Agatha Christie, first published in the US by Dodd, Mead and Company in March 1948 under the title of There Is a Tide... and in the UK by the Collins Crime Club in the November of the same year under Christie's original title. The US edition retailed at $2.50 and the UK edition at eight shillings and sixpence (8/6). It features her famous Belgian detective, Hercule Poirot, and is set in 1946.

== Plot introduction ==
In spring 1944 during World War II, Gordon Cloade marries a widow he meets on board ship to New York, Rosaleen Underhay. A few days after arriving in London with his new wife, his London home is bombed, killing all but two people: Rosaleen and her brother, David Hunter. Gordon did not write a new will upon arrival, and his existing will is invalidated by the marriage. Rosaleen inherits Gordon's fortune. A day or so later, during another raid, Poirot sits in a shelter with people from the Coronation club in London and listens to a story about Major Porter's friend Robert Underhay in Africa, about his unhappy marriage and how Underhay may not be dead, told after reading out the news that Gordon Cloade, the second husband of Underhay's widow, was killed by enemy action.

The death of Gordon Cloade brings unexpected change to his siblings and their families. Gordon gave them capital to start a venture, to handle unexpected expenses, encouraged them not to save, and promised his fortune would be split among them when he died.

== Plot summary ==
In spring 1946, Lynn Marchmont, a Wren during the war, settles again in her mother's home in the village of Warmsley Vale in peacetime, at first happy to be home, then finding life dull. She has been engaged to farmer Rowley Cloade since before the war.

David guards his sister and her fortune. Mrs Marchmont gets up the courage to ask Rosaleen for five hundred pounds when David is away, and Rosaleen writes a cheque. David angrily turns down a request from Frances Cloade, whose family is in desperate need of money.

A man calling himself Enoch Arden arrives at the village inn The Stag, and attempts to blackmail David by saying he knows how to find Rosaleen's first husband, Robert Underhay. Their conversation is overheard by the landlady, who tells Rowley Cloade. A few days later, a maid finds Arden's body in his room with his head smashed in. That same day, David was down from London. He met Lynn on his dash to catch the last train to London, and evidently telephoned her from the London flat shortly after 11 pm, arguing first that he loves her and then that he cannot be good for her. As the murder is believed to have happened before 9 pm, he had enough opportunity and motive and he is arrested.

Rowley Cloade appeals to the detective Hercule Poirot to find the true identity of the dead man. Poirot asks Major Porter. Rosaleen sees the body and says she does not know the man at all. At the inquest, Porter says that Arden was indeed Robert Underhay, and the coroner's jury votes against advice to believe him, voting wilful murder by David. The estate will revert to the Cloades, if the jury's decision holds, as it means Rosaleen's second marriage was not valid.

Poirot talks to people in the village, including Mrs Leadbetter, a guest at the inn who saw a "hussy", a heavily made-up woman wearing slacks and an orange scarf, enter the room assigned to the dead man after 10 pm on the fateful evening. As the police believe that David was on the train to London at that time, they let him go, and look more seriously at women. Poirot learns how the death occurred, with a fall on the marble fender of the fireplace. He proposes it was accidental death, not intentional murder.

Lynn is falling in love with David. Major Porter commits suicide in London but leaves no note. Poirot realises from a photo at the home of Frances Cloade that Arden was related to her; she admits Arden was Charles Trenton, her second cousin. She came up with the plan to blackmail Rosaleen after hearing Major Porter's story about Underhay. This explains Arden's true identity, but nothing else. Frances denies bribing Major Porter.

When Poirot and Lynn visit Rosaleen at home, the maid realises she does not respond. Poirot sees that Rosaleen has died in her sleep. The doctor identifies the harmless sleeping powder she took, at her bedside table. Superintendent Spence, the investigating officer, suggests that she was the murderer. Rosaleen died from too much morphine; where did she get it?

Lynn tells Rowley that she wishes to marry David Hunter and he explodes in anger. Rowley is strangling Lynn when Poirot enters the house, and Rowley stops. David arrives shortly, and Poirot explains everything. Rowley visited Arden, and seeing the resemblance to Frances, reacted angrily to the deception. Punched by Rowley, Arden fell against the marble fireplace fender and died. Rowley saw the opportunity to incriminate David. He smashed in Arden's head with fire tongs and left David's lighter at the scene. Rowley persuaded Porter to give the false identification by offering him money. Then Rowley employed Poirot, who would be sure to go to Porter. Porter's guilt led him to commit suicide, leaving a note that Rowley destroyed. David was about to pay the blackmail to Arden; upon discovering Arden's body, David ran for the late train but missed it. David then backtracked to The Stag, disguised himself as a woman, and played out the scene, heard by Mrs Leadbetter, which established the later time of death. Then he called Rosaleen, who placed a call to Lynn that was delivered by the operator but then cut off. A minute later, David called Lynn from a local call box, giving her the impression that he was calling from London. He returned to London on the early morning milk train the next day.

Of the three deaths, Poirot says one is accidental, one is a suicide, and one is murder. The true murder victim was Rosaleen. The woman known as Rosaleen was not David Hunter's sister; his sister was killed and the housemaid Eileen Corrigan had survived the bombing. Poirot sent to Ireland for a photo of Eileen, which explained the truth of what happened during the war. David persuaded her to be Rosaleen. Now he could kill this accomplice with a morphine pill and marry Lynn, whom he loved. Poirot knows all these details but only some of them are known to the police. Rowley feels guilty about the deaths of Trenton and Porter. The police focus on David killing Rosaleen/Eileen, and proving all of that case. After a while, Lynn returns to Rowley, realising she does love him, especially after his show of force. Life will not be dull with him.

== Characters ==
- Hercule Poirot: Belgian detective who lives in London.
- Superintendent Spence: investigating officer.
- Sergeant Graves: Spence's assistant.
- Rosaleen Cloade: twice widowed while in her early 20s; formerly Mrs Robert Underhay. Most recently married to Gordon Cloade.
- David Hunter: Rosaleen's brother. Former daring WW2 commando and a gambler in life. David gained luxury through his sister's marriage and is anxious to keep it.
- Gordon Cloade: wealthy patriarch of the Cloade family. Long-widowed and childless, he shares his wealth with his sister and brothers. Abruptly, he remarried in 1944, only to die in a bombing raid in London soon after.
- Jeremy Cloade: senior partner in a firm of solicitors and older brother of Gordon.
- Frances Cloade: Jeremy's wife. Shrewd and level-headed. She is the daughter of one of Jeremy's late clients.
- Anthony Cloade: son of Jeremy and Frances. Died in the war.
- Lionel Cloade: a doctor and medical researcher. Younger brother of Gordon. Since his brother's death, he has become a morphine addict.
- Katherine Cloade: Lionel's wife, referred to as Aunt Kathie. Aunt Kathie is a believer in the spirit world, and the first to visit Poirot regarding Underhay.
- Rowley Cloade: a farmer who lost his farming partner in the war. Nephew of Gordon, son of Gordon's late brother Maurice. Engaged to his cousin Lynn Marchmont.
- Johnnie Vavasour: Rowley's farming partner. Killed in the war.
- Lynn Marchmont: a demobbed Wren, fiancée to Rowley, in her early 20s. Lynn is restless after the war and seeks excitement.
- Adela Marchmont: Lynn's elderly widowed mother and younger sister of Gordon. She is inclined to procrastination.
- Beatrice Lippincott: landlady of The Stag pub and inn.
- Gladys: Maid at The Stag Inn.
- Major Porter: a retired soldier who is a member at the same London club as Jeremy Cloade; he is called a club bore for the long stories he tells.
- Enoch Arden: alias used by the blackmailer of David Hunter and Rosaleen Cloade; Charles Trenton. He threatens to expose the apparent illegitimacy of Rosaleen and Gordon Cloade's marriage.
- Mrs Leadbetter: a widow and guest at The Stag who stays for a month each year. She is old-fashioned and captious.
- Robert Underhay: Previous husband of Rosaleen Cloade. Said to have died in Africa.
- Eileen Corrigan: A housemaid who once served Rosaleen and Gordon Cloade until the bombing attack on their house. She once shared a relationship with David Hunter.

== Explanation of the novel's title ==
The title of the book in both the UK and US markets is a line from Shakespeare's Julius Caesar in a speech by Brutus in Act IV: "There is a tide in the affairs of men, which taken at the flood leads on to fortune ...". The quotation is given in full as the epigraph to the novel.

== Literary significance and reception ==
For once, Maurice Richardson, in his review of the 21 November 1948 issue of The Observer, was slightly unimpressed: "Agatha Christie has, if not a whole day off, at least part of the afternoon. The killing of the blackmailing Enoch Arden, who puts up at the local to harry the already embarrassed Cloade family, the murder that follows, and Poirot's doubly twisted solution are ingenious enough, but the characterisation is a little below par. The quintessential zest, the sense of well-being which goes to make up that Christie feeling, is missing."

An unnamed reviewer in the Toronto Daily Star of 10 April 1948 said, "Hercule Poirot, whose eggshaped cranium is crammed with lively gray cells, proves himself a bit of a mug before he sorts out all the details of [Enoch Arden's] death and other even more baffling mysteries. But he does it with all the acumen that has endeared him to Agatha Christie fans. Fantastic and topping."

Robert Barnard summarised the plot of the novel as an "Elderly man married to a glamorous nitwit of dubious social background [which] is a common plot-element in Christie. Here she is widowed (in an air-raid – this is one of the few Christies anchored to an actual time), and burdened by financially insatiable relatives, both of blood and in-law. But who exactly is dead, and who isn't? And who is what they seem, and who isn't?" His commentary is favourable on the title, more cryptic on the novel itself, as he said it was a "Compulsive reworking of Tennysonian and Christiean themes, and pretty high up in the range of classic titles."

== References to other works ==
The false alibi used by the murderer of a witness sighting the missed train smoke was a partial re-use of a plot device used by Christie in the 1925 short story The Sign in the Sky, later published in the 1930 collection The Mysterious Mr. Quin.

== Publication history ==
Dustjacket illustration of the UK First Edition (Book was first published in the US)

- 1948, Dodd Mead and Company (New York), March 1948, Hardcover, 242 pp
- 1948, Collins Crime Club (London), November 1948, Hardcover, 192 pp
- 1949, Pocket Books (New York), Paperback
- 1955, Dell Books, Paperback, 224 pp
- 1961, Fontana Books (Imprint of HarperCollins), Paperback, 192 pp
- 1965, Pan Books, Paperback, 204 pp
- 1971, Ulverscroft Large-print Edition, Hardcover, 386 pp ISBN 0-85456-084-X
- 2006, Audio Partners, narrator Hugh Fraser, ISBN 978-1-57270-533-3
- 2016, William Morrow & Company (USA edition), Hardcover ISBN 978-0-06-257342-1

== Adaptations ==
=== Television ===
A television film was produced in 2006 with David Suchet as Poirot in the ITV series Agatha Christie's Poirot. The cast included Elliot Cowan as David Hunter, Eva Birthistle as Rosaleen, Celia Imrie as Kathy Cloade, Jenny Agutter as Adela Marchmont and Tim Pigott-Smith as Dr Lionel Woodward. The film made several significant changes to the plot:

- Like almost all episodes of the TV series, the adaptation shifts the setting to the late 1930s.
- David's motive is modified in the adaptation, upgrading him from a simple murderer, to that of a mass murderer. In the adaptation, the deaths of Gordon Cloade, Rosaleen Turner, and the entire Cloade household that was present with them, are assumed to be the result of an apparent gas explosion, but Poirot later investigates this and reveals in his denouement that the explosion was caused by dynamite that David had planted in the house, seeking revenge against his sister for marrying Gordon and excluding her brother as her "first love". He and his accomplice, Eileen Corrigan took shelter in the basement once the explosives had been planted, and then emerged from the ruins afterwards.
- Eileen's involvement is significantly changed - She is an Irish Catholic in the adaptation, whom David seduced, made pregnant and forced into an induced abortion. This breaks her and forces her to submit to David's will under the promise of heaven if she obeys his commands or eternal damnation in "the fires of hell" if she refuses. This is reinforced by his using her guilt to induce her into a morphine addiction. Unlike the novel, she is saved from dying of a morphine overdose thanks to Dr Woodward's addiction to the drug, leading him to steal some of her supply. Poirot not only proves her addiction but also that David had manoeuvred her into attempting to kill herself as a result of her own guilty actions.
- Kathy repeatedly harasses Eileen with anonymous phone calls, in which she calls her "whore", "slut", "bitch" and "bigamist", an event that does not occur in the novel. In addition, she becomes Adela's sister: Lionel is no longer a member of the Cloade family, despite a mistake in the adaptation's credits that refer him to be so; he is instead renamed as Lionel Woodward, and introduced as such by Kathy when she visits Poirot at the beginning of the adaptation.
- After David is denounced for his crimes in the Stag Inn, he threatens to blow it all up with everyone inside it. Lynn talks him into sparing everyone, only for him to reveal this to be nothing more than a cruel joke as there is no dynamite inside. The event does not occur in the novel.
- Lynn does not marry Rowley towards the end. Instead, after David is hanged, she leaves England to head for Africa. Saying goodbye to Poirot, she requests, "Write me a letter, monsieur. I like your letters."

This story was adapted for television in the episode Le flux et le reflux [The Ebb and the Flow] in the French series Les Petits Meurtres d'Agatha Christie, the eighth episode in the first series, first airing 15 April 2011. Antoine Duléry was Superintendent Larosière, and Marius Colucci was his assistant, Lampion. The adaptation was written by Anne Giafferi and Murielle Magellan, and directed by Sylvie Simon. The plot is essentially the same, but set in a chateau in France, where the extended family of Capitaine Delarive lives. He marries late in life to a younger woman, and brings her and her brother back to France. There is a fire, he is killed. He has not revised his will after his marriage, so his widow inherits his wealth. The denouement is announced by Larosière, who gets back on the case once he overcomes his grief for his good friend Delarive. The woman put forth as his wife surviving the fire was a maid, and the man who claimed to be her brother, was not her brother, and he killed the maid. There is a suicide and an accidental death, as well.

=== Radio ===
John Moffatt played Poirot in the 2004 BBC Radio 4 adaptation of the novel.
