= The Twelve Lives of Alfred Hitchcock =

2021 book by Edward White

The Twelve Lives of Alfred Hitchcock: An Anatomy of the Master of Suspense
- Author: Edward White
- Language: English
- Subject: Alfred Hitchcock
- Publisher: W. W. Norton & Company
- Publication date: April 13, 2021
- Pages: 400
- ISBN: 978-1-324-00239-0

The Twelve Lives of Alfred Hitchcock: An Anatomy of the Master of Suspense is a 2021 book by Edward White that examines Alfred Hitchcock.

Publishers Weekly called it a "canny, full portrait of an artist with a singular vision."
