= The Unquiet Englishman =

2021 book by Richard Greene

The Unquiet Englishman: A Life of Graham Greene
- Author: Richard Greene
- Language: English
- Subject: Graham Greene
- Publisher: W. W. Norton & Company
- Publication date: January 12, 2021
- Pages: 608
- ISBN: 978-0-393-08432-0

The Unquiet Englishman: A Life of Graham Greene is a 2021 biography by Richard Greene that examines Graham Greene.
