= The Scientific Sherlock Holmes =

Book by James O'Brien

The Scientific Sherlock Holmes: Cracking the Case with Science and Forensics
- Author: James O'Brien
- Genre: Crime, Mystery, Forensic science
- Published: 2013
- Publisher: Oxford University Press, USA
- Pages: 208
- Awards: Edgar Award for Best Critical/Biographical Work (2013)
- ISBN: 978-0-199-79496-6
- Website: The Scientific Sherlock Holmes

The Scientific Sherlock Holmes: Cracking the Case with Science and Forensics (ISBN 978-0-199-79496-6) is a book written by James O'Brien, which was originally published on 3 December 2012 and then by Oxford University Press, USA on 3 January 2013.

The book later went on to win the Edgar Award for Best Critical / Biographical Work in 2013.
