= America Is Elsewhere =

2013 book by Erik Dussere

America Is Elsewhere: The Noir Tradition in the Age of Consumer Culture
- Author: Erik Dussere
- Genre: Literature, History
- Published: 2013
- Publisher: Oxford University Press
- Pages: 299
- Awards: Edgar Award for Best Critical/Biographical Works (2014)
- ISBN: 978-0-199-96991-3
- Website: America Is Elsewhere

America Is Elsewhere: The Noir Tradition in the Age of Consumer Culture (ISBN 978-0-199-96991-3) is a book written by Erik Dussere and published by Oxford University Press on 1 November 2013 which later went on to win the Edgar Award for Best Critical / Biographical in 2014.
