= Hercule Poirot in literature =

This page details the books featuring the fictional character Hercule Poirot, created by Agatha Christie.

== Copyright and continuation ==
The Poirot books are still under copyright in the United Kingdom, and will not enter the public domain there until January 1, 2047. (Note: Copyright length is life+70 in the United Kingdom. Copyrights expire at the end of the year, placing the copyright expiration in 2047 and not 2046.) Christie's grandson, Mathew Prichard, currently owns the copyright to his grandmother's works.

In the United States various Poirot stories are in the public domain due to different copyright rules. As of 2026, all works published in 1930 and before featuring Poirot are in the public domain in the US. This includes notable titles like The Mysterious Affair at Styles, The Murder of Roger Ackroyd and Poirot Investigates.

In 2013, the Christie estate authorised author Sophie Hannah to write a new Poirot book, The Monogram Murders (2014). She has since written five further novels in the series. The Christie Estate refers to these as the 'Poirot Continuation Novels'.

== Hercule Poirot series in publication order ==
Short story collections listed as "ss"

1. The Mysterious Affair at Styles (1920)
2. The Murder on the Links (1923)
3. Poirot Investigates (1924, ss)
4. The Murder of Roger Ackroyd (1926)
5. The Big Four (1927)
6. The Mystery of the Blue Train (1928)
7. Black Coffee (1930 play) (A novelization by Charles Osborne was published in 1998.)
8. Peril at End House (1932)
9. Lord Edgware Dies (1933) also published as Thirteen at Dinner
10. Murder on the Orient Express (1934) also published as Murder in the Calais Coach
11. Three Act Tragedy (1935) also published as Murder in Three Acts
12. Death in the Clouds (1935) also published as Death in the Air
13. The A.B.C. Murders (1936) also published as The Alphabet Murders
14. Murder in Mesopotamia (1936)
15. Cards on the Table (1936)
16. Murder in the Mews (1937, ss) also published as Dead Man's Mirror
17. Dumb Witness (1937) also published as Poirot Loses a Client
18. Death on the Nile (1937) also published as Murder on the Nile and as Hidden Horizon
19. Appointment with Death (1938)
20. Hercule Poirot's Christmas (1938) also published as Murder for Christmas and as A Holiday for Murder
21. Sad Cypress (1940)
22. One, Two, Buckle My Shoe (1940) also published as An Overdose of Death and as The Patriotic Murders
23. Evil Under the Sun (1941)
24. Five Little Pigs (1942) also published as Murder in Retrospect
25. The Hollow (1946) also published as Murder after Hours
26. The Labours of Hercules (1947, ss)
27. Taken at the Flood (1948) also published as There Is a Tide
28. The Under Dog and Other Stories (1951, ss)
29. Mrs McGinty's Dead (1952) also published as Blood Will Tell
30. After the Funeral (1953) also published as Funerals are Fatal
31. Hickory Dickory Dock (1955) also published as Hickory Dickory Death
32. Dead Man's Folly (1956)
33. Cat Among the Pigeons (1959)
34. The Clocks (1963)
35. Third Girl (1966)
36. Hallowe'en Party (1969)
37. Elephants Can Remember (1972)
38. Poirot's Early Cases (1974, ss)
39. Curtain (written about 1940, published 1975) also published as Curtain: Poirot's Last Case

Stories featuring Hercule Poirot also appear in the collections The Regatta Mystery and Other Stories (1939), The Witness for the Prosecution and Other Stories (1948), Three Blind Mice and Other Stories (1950), The Adventure of the Christmas Pudding (1960), Double Sin and Other Stories (1961), Problem at Pollensa Bay and Other Stories (1991), The Harlequin Tea Set (1997) and While the Light Lasts and Other Stories (1997).

=== Continuations by other authors ===
- The Monogram Murders, by Sophie Hannah (2014)
- Closed Casket, by Hannah (2016)
- The Mystery of Three Quarters, by Hannah (2018)
- The Killings at Kingfisher Hill, by Hannah (2020)
- Hercule Poirot's Silent Night, by Hannah (2023)
- The Last Death of the Year, by Hannah (2025)

== Books and short stories in chronological order ==
=== Poirot's police years ===
- "The Chocolate Box" (short story from Poirot's Early Cases)

=== Career as a private detective and retirement ===
==== Shortly after Poirot flees to England (1916–1919) ====
- The Mysterious Affair at Styles
- "The Kidnapped Prime Minister" (short story from Poirot Investigates)"
- "The Affair at the Victory Ball" (short story from Poirot's Early Cases)

==== The Twenties (1920–1929) ====
Poirot settles down in London and opens a private detective agency. These are the short story years (26 short stories and only 4 novels).

- "The Jewel Robbery at the Grand Metropolitan" (short story from Poirot Investigates)
- "The King of Clubs" (short story from Poirot's Early Cases)
- "The Disappearance of Mr Davenheim" (short story from Poirot Investigates)
- "The Plymouth Express" (short story from Poirot's Early Cases)
- "The Adventure of the Western Star" (short story from Poirot Investigates)
- "The Tragedy at Marsdon Manor" (short story from Poirot Investigates)
- "The Million Dollar Bond Robbery" (short story from Poirot Investigates)
- "The Adventure of the Cheap Flat" (short story from Poirot Investigates)
- "The Mystery of the Hunters Lodge" (short story from Poirot Investigates)
- "The Adventure of the Egyptian Tomb" (short story from Poirot Investigates)
- "The Veiled Lady" (short story from Poirot's Early Cases)
- "The Adventure of Johnny Waverly" (short story from Poirot's Early Cases)
- "The Market Basing Mystery" (short story from Poirot's Early Cases)
- "The Adventure of the Italian Nobleman" (short story from Poirot Investigates)
- "The Case of the Missing Will" (short story from Poirot Investigates)
- "The Submarine Plans" (short story from Poirot's Early Cases)
- "The Adventure of the Clapham Cook" (short story from Poirot's Early Cases)
- "The Lost Mine" (short story from Poirot's Early Cases)
- "The Cornish Mystery" (short story from Poirot's Early Cases)
- "The Double Clue" (short story from Poirot's Early Cases)
- "The Lemesurier Inheritance" (short story from Poirot's Early Cases)
- "Double Sin" (short story from Poirot's Early Cases)
- Murder on the Links
- "Christmas Adventure" (short story from "While the Light Lasts and Other Stories")
- The Big Four
- The Murder of Roger Ackroyd
- "The Under Dog" (short story from The Under Dog and Other Stories)
- The Mystery of the Blue Train is an expanded version of "The Plymouth Express"
- "Wasp's Nest" (short story from Poirot's Early Cases)
- "The Third Floor Flat" (short story from Poirot's Early Cases)

==== The Thirties (1930–1939) and World War II ====
Christie increased her novel production during this time (16 novels, 24 total short stories and 1 theatre play). Twelve short stories form The Labours of Hercules. The other short stories listed here take place in this period but were published before and after the publication of Hercules. The theatre play is named Black Coffee and was written by Agatha Christie, who stated a frustration with other stage adaptations of her Poirot mysteries. In 1998, author Charles Osborne adapted the play into a novel.

- Black Coffee
- Peril at End House
- "The Mystery Of The Baghdad Chest" (short story from "The Regatta Mystery")
- "The Second Gong" (short story from "Problem at Pollensa Bay and Other Stories")
- Lord Edgware Dies, also published as Thirteen at Dinner
- Murder on the Orient Express also published as Murder in the Calais Coach
- Three Act Tragedy, also published as Murder in Three Acts
- Death in the Clouds
- "How Does Your Garden Grow?" (short story from Poirot's Early Cases and The Regatta Mystery)
- The A.B.C. Murders
- Murder in Mesopotamia
- "Problem at Sea" (short story from Poirot's Early Cases and The Regatta Mystery)
- "Triangle at Rhodes" (short story from Murder in the Mews)
- "Poirot and the Regatta Mystery" (1936 short story)
- Cards on the Table
- Dumb Witness (also published as Poirot Loses a Client)
- "Murder in the Mews" (short story from Murder in the Mews) is an expanded version of The Market Basing Mystery"
- "Dead Man's Mirror" (short story from Murder in the Mews) is an expanded version of The Second Gong in Problem at Pollensa Bay
- "The Incredible Theft" (short story from Murder in the Mews) is an expanded version of "The Submarine Plans"
- Death on the Nile
- Appointment with Death
- "Yellow Iris" (short story from The Regatta Mystery)
- "The Dream" (short story from The Adventure of the Christmas Pudding and The Regatta Mystery)
- Hercule Poirot's Christmas also published as Murder for Christmas and Holiday for Murder
- Sad Cypress
- "The Nemean Lion" (short story from The Labours of Hercules)
- "The Lernaean Hydra" (short story from The Labours of Hercules)
- "The Arcadian Deer" (short story from The Labours of Hercules)
- "The Erymanthian Boar" (short story from The Labours of Hercules)
- "The Augean Stables" (short story from The Labours of Hercules)
- "The Stymphalean Birds" (short story from The Labours of Hercules)
- "The Cretan Bull" (short story from The Labours of Hercules)
- "The Horses of Diomedes" (short story from The Labours of Hercules)
- "The Girdle of Hyppolita" (short story from The Labours of Hercules)
- "The Flock of Geryon" (short story from The Labours of Hercules)
- "The Apples of Hesperides" (short story from The Labours of Hercules)
- "The Capture of Cerberus" (short story from The Labours of Hercules)
- One, Two, Buckle My Shoe also published as Patriotic Murders and Overdose of Death
- "Four and Twenty Blackbirds" (short story from The Adventure of the Christmas Pudding)
- Evil Under The Sun
- Five Little Pigs also published as Murder in Retrospect

=== Post-World War II ===
In chronological order, only the following are set after World War II.

- The Hollow also published as Murder after Hours
- Taken at the Flood also published as There Is a Tide
- Mrs McGinty's Dead also published as Blood Will Tell
- After the Funeral also published as Funerals are Fatal
- Hickory Dickory Dock also published as Hickory Dickory Death
- Dead Man's Folly
- Cat Among the Pigeons
- The Mystery of the Spanish Chest (short story from The Adventure of the Christmas Pudding and The Regatta Mystery) is an expanded version of "The Mystery of the Baghdad Chest"
- "The Adventure of the Christmas Pudding" also published as "The Theft Of The Royal Ruby" (short story from The Adventure of the Christmas Pudding) is an expanded version of "The Christmas Adventure"
- The Clocks
- Third Girl
- Hallowe'en Party
- Elephants Can Remember
- Curtain, Hercule Poirot's last case (published in 1975)

== Expanded/adapted stories ==
Some Poirot adventures were later expanded into other stories or re-written. They are:

- The Plymouth Express (1923 short story) was expanded into the 1928 novel The Mystery of the Blue Train
- The Market Basing Mystery (1923 short story) was expanded into the 1936 novella Murder In The Mews
- The Submarine Plans (1923 short story) was expanded into the 1937 novella The Incredible Theft
- Christmas Adventure (1923 short story) was expanded into the 1960 novella The Adventure of the Christmas Pudding
- The Mystery of the Baghdad Chest (1932 short story) was expanded into the 1960 novella The Mystery of the Spanish Chest
- The Second Gong (1932 short story) was expanded into the 1937 novella Dead Man's Mirror
- The Regatta Mystery (1936 short story) was re-written in 1939 featuring Parker Pyne instead of Poirot
- Yellow Iris (1937 short story) was expanded into the 1945 novel Sparkling Cyanide featuring Col. John Race instead of Poirot
- Hercule Poirot and the Greenshore Folly (posthumous novella) expanded into the 1956 novel Dead Man's Folly
- The Incident of the Dog's Ball (posthumous short story) expanded into the 1937 novel Dumb Witness
- The Capture of Cerberus (posthumous short story), originally intended to be the last of The Labours of Hercules but re-written due to its political content

=== Drama ===
Other stories were adapted by Christie into plays, sometimes removing Poirot:

- Alibi (1928 play) written together with Michael Morton
- Wasp's Nest (1937 TV play)
- The Yellow Iris (1937 radio play)
- Appointment with Death (1945 play) in which Poirot doesn't appear
- Hidden Horizon (1944 play) in which Poirot doesn't appear
- The Hollow (1951 play) in which Poirot doesn't appear

In addition, the 1930 play Black Coffee was novelized by Charles Osborne in 1998.
