= Agatha Christie's fictional universe =

Creations of the English novelist (1890–1976)

In Agatha Christie's mystery novels, several characters cross over different sagas, creating a fictional universe in which most of her stories are set. This article has one table to summarize the novels with characters who occur in other Christie novels; the table is titled Crossovers by Christie. There is brief mention of characters crossing over in adaptations of the novels. Her publications, both novels and short stories, are then listed by main detective, in order of publication. Some stories or novels authorised by the estate of Agatha Christie, using the characters she created, and written long after Agatha Christie died, are included in the lists.

Her novels under the pen name Mary Westmacott and her nonfiction books are not covered in this article.

One notable example of characters from one novel appearing in another is the novel The Pale Horse, which featured no fewer than five cross-over characters: Ariadne Oliver, Major Despard and his wife Rhoda (all had previously appeared in the Poirot mystery Cards on the Table; although Mrs Oliver appeared in numerous later Poirot mysteries) and the Rev and Mrs Dane Calthrop (who were seen in the Miss Marple mystery The Moving Finger).

== List of cross-overs ==
=== Crossovers by Christie ===
| Story | Length | Year | Crossing-over characters |
|---|---|---|---|
| The Secret Adversary | Novel | 1922 | Tommy and Tuppence, Albert Batt, A. Carter, James Japp |
| The Mystery of the Blue Train | Novel | 1928 | Hercule Poirot, Katherine Grey (who lives in St. Mary Mead), Mr. Goby |
| "The Case of the Discontented Soldier" | Short story | 1932 | Parker Pyne, Ariadne Oliver |
| "The Case of the Distressed Lady" | Short story | 1932 | Parker Pyne, Miss Lemon |
| "The Case of the Discontented Husband" | Short story | 1932 | Parker Pyne, Ariadne Oliver |
| "The Case of the Middle-aged Wife" | Short story | 1932 | Parker Pyne, Miss Lemon |
| "The Second Gong" | Short story | 1932 | Hercule Poirot, Mr Satterthwaite |
| Three Act Tragedy | Novel | 1934 | Hercule Poirot, Mr Satterthwaite |
| "How Does Your Garden Grow?" | Short story | 1935 | Hercule Poirot, Miss Lemon |
| Cards on the Table | Novel | 1936 | Hercule Poirot, Ariadne Oliver, Superintendent Battle, Colonel Race, Colonel Despard, Rhoda Despard |
| Murder in Mesopotamia | Novel | 1936 | Hercule Poirot, Amy Leatheran |
| Dead Man's Mirror | Novella | 1937 | Hercule Poirot, Mr Satterthwaite |
| Death on the Nile | Novel | 1937 | Hercule Poirot, Colonel Race |
| The Moving Finger | Novel | 1942 | Miss Marple, Mrs Dane Calthrop, Rev Dane Calthrop |
| Towards Zero | Novel | 1944 | Superintendent Battle, Hercule Poirot (mentioned) |
| The Labours of Hercules | Collection of related short stories | 1947 | Hercule Poirot, Miss Lemon, James Japp, Sherlock and Mycroft Holmes (mentioned) |
| Mrs McGinty's Dead | Novel | 1952 | Hercule Poirot, Ariadne Oliver |
| After the Funeral | Novel | 1953 | Hercule Poirot, Mr. Goby |
| Hickory Dickory Dock | Novel | 1955 | Hercule Poirot, Miss Lemon |
| Dead Man's Folly | Novel | 1956 | Hercule Poirot, Ariadne Oliver, Miss Lemon |
| Cat Among the Pigeons | Novel | 1959 | Hercule Poirot, Mr Robinson, Colonel Pikeaway |
| The Pale Horse | Novel | 1961 | Ariadne Oliver, Colonel Despard, Rhoda Despard, Mrs Dane Calthrop, Rev Dane Calthrop |
| The Clocks | Novel | 1963 | Hercule Poirot, Superintendent Battle (mentioned) |
| At Bertram's Hotel | Novel | 1965 | Miss Marple, Mr Robinson |
| Third Girl | Novel | 1966 | Hercule Poirot, Ariadne Oliver, Miss Lemon, Mr. Goby |
| Hallowe'en Party | Novel | 1969 | Hercule Poirot, Ariadne Oliver |
| Passenger to Frankfurt | Novel | 1970 | Mr Robinson, Colonel Pikeaway, Amy Leatheran |
| Elephants Can Remember | Novel | 1972 | Hercule Poirot, Ariadne Oliver, Miss Lemon, Mr. Goby |
| Postern of Fate | Novel | 1973 | Tommy and Tuppence, Mr Robinson, Colonel Pikeaway, Albert Batt |
| Hercule Poirot and the Greenshore Folly | Novella | 2013 (written 1954) | Hercule Poirot, Ariadne Oliver, Miss Lemon |

=== Crossovers in media adaptations of novels or short stories ===
Outside of stories by Christie herself, three media adaptations of her works have featured crossovers involving Miss Marple which Christie herself never wrote; two of the three aired many decades after her death:

- The Alphabet Murders (1966 film) features a meeting between Poirot and Marple, where they exchange glances.
- Agatha Christie's Great Detectives Poirot and Marple, a 2004 anime series, connects the two.
- The 2006 adaptation of By the Pricking of My Thumbs, as episode 7 (season 2 episode 3) of Agatha Christie's Marple, has Marple meet Tuppence while Tommy is away.

== List of novels & short stories by featured detective ==
=== Hercule Poirot ===
- The Mysterious Affair at Styles (1920 novel)
- "The Adventure of the Western Star" (1923 short story)
- "The Tragedy at Marsdon Manor" (1923 short story)
- "The Adventure of the Cheap Flat" (1923 short story)
- "The Mystery of Hunter's Lodge" (1923 short story)
- "The Million Dollar Bond Robbery" (1923 short story)
- "The Adventure of the Egyptian Tomb" (1923 short story)
- "The Jewel Robbery at the Grand Metropolitan" (1923 short story)
- "The Kidnapped Prime Minister" (1923 short story)
- "The Disappearance of Mr Davenheim" (1923 short story)
- "The Adventure of the Italian Nobleman" (1923 short story)
- "The Case of the Missing Will" (1923 short story)
- "Christmas Adventure" (1923 short story)
- "The Affair at the Victory Ball" (1923 short story)
- "The Adventure of the Clapham Cook" (1923 short story)
- "The Cornish Mystery" (1923 short story)
- "The Adventure of Johnnie Waverly" (1923 short story)
- "The Double Clue" (1923 short story)
- "The King of Clubs" (1923 short story)
- "The LeMesurier Inheritance" (1923 short story)
- "The Lost Mine" (1923 short story)
- "The Plymouth Express" (1923 short story)
- "The Chocolate Box" (1923 short story)
- "The Veiled Lady" (1923 short story)
- "The Submarine Plans" (1923 short story)
- "The Market Basing Mystery" (1923 short story)
- The Murder on the Links (1923 novel)
- The Murder of Roger Ackroyd (1926 novel)
- "The Under Dog" (1926 short story)
- The Big Four (1927 novel)
- "Double Sin" (1928 short story)
- "Wasp's Nest" (1928 short story)
- Alibi (1928 play)
- "The Third Floor Flat" (1929 short story)
- Black Coffee (1930 play)
- Peril at End House (1932 novel)
- "The Mystery of the Baghdad Chest" (1932 short story)
- Lord Edgware Dies (1933 novel)
- Murder on the Orient Express (1934 novel)
- Three Act Tragedy (1934 novel)
- Death in the Clouds (1935 novel)
- The A.B.C. Murders (1936 novel)
- "Murder in the Mews" (1936 novella)
- "Triangle at Rhodes" (1936 novella)
- "Problem at Sea" (1936 short story)
- "Poirot and the Regatta Mystery" (1936 short story)
- "The Incredible Theft" (1937 novella)
- "Yellow Iris" (1937 short story)
- "The Dream" (1937 short story)
- Dumb Witness (1937 novel)
- Death on the Nile (1937 novel)
- Wasp's Nest (1937 TV play)
- The Yellow Iris (1937 radio play)
- Appointment with Death (1938 novel)
- Hercule Poirot's Christmas (1938 novel)
- Sad Cypress (1940 novel)
- One, Two, Buckle My Shoe (1940 novel)
- "Four and Twenty Blackbirds" (1941 short story)
- Evil Under the Sun (1941 novel)
- Five Little Pigs (1942 novel)
- The Hollow (1946 novel)
- Taken at the Flood (1948 novel)
- After the Funeral (1953 novel)
- "The Adventure of the Christmas Pudding" (1960 novella)
- "The Mystery of the Spanish Chest" (1960 novella)
- Curtain (1975 novel)
- "The Incident of the Dog's Ball" (2010 short story)
- "The Capture of Cerberus" (2010 short story)

=== Miss Marple ===
- "The Tuesday Night Club" (1927 short story)
- "Ingots of Gold" (1928 short story)
- "The Blood-Stained Pavement" (1928 short story)
- "The Idol House of Astarte" (1928 short story)
- "Motive v. Opportunity" (1928 short story)
- "The Thumb Mark of St. Peter" (1928 short story)
- "The Blue Geranium" (1929 short story)
- "The Companion" (1930 short story)
- "The Four Suspects" (1930 short story)
- "A Christmas Tragedy" (1930 short story)
- "The Herb of Death" (1930 short story)
- "The Affair at the Bungalow" (1930 short story)
- "Death by Drowning" (1930 short story)
- The Murder at the Vicarage (1930 novel)
- "Miss Marple Tells a Story" (1934 short story)
- "The Case of the Caretaker" (1941 short story)
- "The Tape-Measure Murder" (1942 short story)
- "The Case of the Perfect Maid" (1942 short story)
- The Body in the Library (1942 novel)
- "Strange Jest" (1944 short story)
- A Murder is Announced (1950 novel)
- They Do It with Mirrors (1952 novel)
- A Pocket Full of Rye (1953 novel)
- "Sanctuary" (1954 short story)
- 4:50 from Paddington (1957 novel)
- "Greenshaw's Folly" (1960 short story)
- The Mirror Crack'd from Side to Side (1962 novel)
- A Caribbean Mystery (1964 novel)
- Nemesis (1971 novel)
- Sleeping Murder (1976 novel)
- "The Case of the Caretaker's Wife" (2011 short story)

=== Mr Satterthwaite ===
- "The Coming of Mr Quin" (1924 short story)
- "The Shadow on the Glass" (1924 short story)
- "At the "Bells and Motley"" (1925 short story)
- "The Sign in the Sky" (1925 short story)
- "The Love Detectives" (1926 short story)
- "The Soul of the Croupier" (1927 short story)
- "The Voice in the Dark" (1927 short story)
- "The Face of Helen" (1927 short story)
- "The Dead Harlequin" (1927 short story)
- "The Bird with the Broken Wing" (1927 short story)
- "The World's End" (1927 short story)
- "Harlequin's Lane" (1927 short story)
- "The Man from the Sea" (1929 short story)
- "The Harlequin Tea Set" (1971 short story)

=== Parker Pyne ===
- "The Case of the City Clerk" (1932 short story)
- "The Case of the Rich Woman" (1932 short story)
- "Have You Got Everything You Want?" (1933 short story)
- "The Gate of Baghdad" (1933 short story)
- "The House at Shiraz" (1933 short story)
- "The Pearl of Price" (1933 short story)
- "Death on the Nile" (1933 short story)
- "The Oracle at Delphi" (1933 short story)
- "Problem at Pollensa Bay" (1936 short story)
- "The Regatta Mystery" (1939 short story)

=== Superintendent Battle ===
- The Secret of Chimneys (1925 novel)
- The Seven Dials Mystery (1929 novel)
- Cards on the Table (1936 novel)
- Murder is Easy (1939 novel)
- Towards Zero (1945 novel)
- Chimneys (2003 play adaption)

=== Tommy and Tuppence ===
- The Secret Adversary (1922 novel)
- Partners in Crime (1929 collection of related short stories)
- N or M? (1941 novel)
- By the Pricking of My Thumbs (1968 novel)
- Postern of Fate (1973 novel)

=== Colonel Race ===
- The Man in the Brown Suit (1924 novel)
- Sparkling Cyanide (1945 novel)
- Cards on the Table (1936 novel)

== Trivia ==
- Agatha Christie herself exists in her fictional universe, as she is mentioned by a character in the Miss Marple novel The Body in the Library.
- In The Labours of Hercules, a character imagines a friendship between the mother of Hercule Poirot and his supposed brother Achille, and the mother of Sherlock and Mycroft Holmes, perhaps implying that Arthur Conan Doyle's Sherlock Holmes adventures are set in the same universe.
- The collection Partners in Crime may create an inconsistency: in it, Tommy and Tuppence mimick a series of famous fictional detectives of the period, including Sherlock Holmes and Hercule Poirot, thus implying that they are fictional in the universe. Similarly, in The Clocks, Poirot takes The Adventures of Sherlock Holmes down from a bookshelf, and utters the word "Maître!" while looking at the book. The narrator asks if it is Sherlock Holmes who is the object of his admiration, to which he responds: "Ah, non, non, not Sherlock Holmes! It is the author, Sir Arthur Conan Doyle, that I salute. These tales of Sherlock Holmes are in reality far-fetched, full of fallacies and most artificially contrived. But the art of the writing – ah, that is entirely different. The pleasure of the language, the creation above all of that magnificent character Dr. Watson. Ah, that was indeed a triumph."
