= The Adventure of the Clapham Cook =

"The Adventure of the Clapham Cook" may refer to

- The Adventure of the Clapham Cook (short story), 1923
- "The Adventure of the Clapham Cook" (TV 1989)
