= Wasp's Nest =

1937 television play broadcast

The billing from the Radio Times issue of 13–19 June 1937, illustrating the afternoon's television programmes including the live performance of Wasp's Nest

Wasp's Nest was a television play broadcast on the BBC Television Service on 18 June 1937. It was adapted from the short story of the same name by crime writer Agatha Christie which had first appeared in the Daily Mail on 20 November 1928 and first appeared in book form in the US collection Double Sin and Other Stories in 1961. It first appeared in a UK collection in Poirot's Early Cases in 1974.

== Live broadcast ==
The play is unique in that it is the only instance of Christie adapting one of her works for television, a medium she later came to dislike. It was broadcast live from Alexandra Palace as part of the programme Theatre Parade. The broadcast took place at 3.35 pm and lasted for twenty-five minutes. It was then repeated the same evening at 9.40 pm and lasted for twenty minutes. Theatre Parade usually showcased successful stage shows of the time but in this instance presented an original work.

The play was only broadcast in the London area as this was the only part of the UK that could receive television transmissions at this time. Neither transmissions were recorded for future viewing as television recording equipment had not been invented at this point in time.

== Depiction of Hercule Poirot ==
The play is notable for starring Francis L. Sullivan in the part of Hercule Poirot, reprising his portrayal of the character following his success in the stage play Black Coffee in 1930.

== Publication of the script ==
The script of the play is published by Samuel French, separately, and in the collection Poirot Double Bill with another short play "Yellow Iris".

== Critical response ==
A three-line review in The Observer of 20 June 1937 by "E.H.R" stated that the first performance was "excellently done".

== Personnel ==
Director/Producer: George More O'Ferrall

Cast:

- Francis L. Sullivan
- Wallace Douglas
- D.A. Clarke-Smith
- Antoinette Cellier
