= The Under Dog and Other Stories =

1951 story collection by Agatha Christie

- Dust-jacket illustration of the first US edition
- Author: Agatha Christie
- Language: English
- Series: Hercule Poirot
- Genre: Detective fiction short story
- Publisher: Dodd Mead and Company
- Publication date: 1951
- Publication place: United Kingdom
- Media type: Print (hardback & paperback)
- Pages: 248
- Preceded by: Taken at the Flood
- Followed by: Mrs McGinty's Dead

The Under Dog and Other Stories is a short story collection by the English writer Agatha Christie and first published in the United States in 1951, Dodd Mead and Company. The title story was published in booklet form along with Blackman's Wood (by E. Phillips Oppenheim) in the United Kingdom in 1929 by The Reader's Library. The first US edition retailed at $2.50.

It contains works from the early days of Christie's career, all featuring Hercule Poirot. All the stories were published in British and American magazines between 1923 and 1926. All of the stories, save the title story, were to appear again in 1974 in Poirot's Early Cases.

== List of stories ==
- The Under Dog
- The Plymouth Express
- The Affair at the Victory Ball
- The Market Basing Mystery
- The Lemesurier Inheritance
- The Cornish Mystery
- The King of Clubs
- The Submarine Plans
- The Adventure of the Clapham Cook

== Publication history ==
- 1929, The Reader's Library (London) (Title Story only)
- 1951, Dodd Mead and Company (New York), Hardback, 248 pp
- 1955, Pocket Books (New York), Paperback, 164 pp
- 1965, Dell Books, Paperback, 192 pp, (Dell number 9228)

=== First publication of stories ===
With the exception of The Under Dog, all of the stories were first published in the UK in The Sketch magazine (see Poirot's Early Cases for details).

- The Under Dog was first published in the US in Volume 8, Number 6 of Mystery Magazine dated 1 April 1926. It was published in the UK in the October 1926 edition of The London Magazine and then in book form in 2 New Crime Stories, published by The Reader's Library in September 1929 (the other story in the volume was Blackman's Wood by E. Phillips Oppenheim) and then in the Collins Crime Club collection The Adventure of the Christmas Pudding (1960). All the remaining stories in the collection were first published in the US in the monthly Blue Book Magazine with uncredited illustrations as follows:
- The Affair at the Victory Ball: September 1923 – Volume 37, Number 5
- The King of Clubs: November 1923 – Volume 38, Number 1
- The Plymouth Express: January 1924 – Volume 38, Number 3 (under the title The Plymouth Express Affair). The plot was later reworked as the novel The Mystery of the Blue Train (1928).
- The Market Basing Mystery: May 1925 – Volume 41, Number 1
- The Submarine Plans: July 1925 – Volume 41, Number 3
- The Adventure of the Clapham Cook: September 1925 – Volume 41, Number 5 (under the title The Clapham Cook).
- The Cornish Mystery: October 1925 – Volume 41, Number 6
- The Lemesurier Inheritance: November 1925 – Volume 42, Number 1
