= The Yellow Iris (radio drama) =

1937 radio play written by Agatha Christie

Programme billing for the first performance of The Yellow Iris from the Radio Times of 29 October 1937.

The Yellow Iris is a radio play written by Agatha Christie and broadcast on the BBC National Programme on Tuesday 2 November 1937 at 8.00pm. The one-hour programme was broadcast again two days later, this time on the BBC Regional Programme at 9.00pm.

The script was based on the short story, Yellow Iris, which had been published in issue 559 of the Strand Magazine in July of the same year. The main part of the story takes place in a London restaurant and the play was unusual in that the producer, Douglas Moodie, interspersed the action with the performances of the cabaret artistes who were supposedly on the bill at the restaurant.

The cabaret artistes were compered by Cyril Fletcher, later famous for his appearances on the television consumer programme That's Life!. The artistes were Hugh French, the singer Janet Lind, "The Three Admirals" vocal group and Inga Anderson.

The lyrics to the songs featured were written by Christopher Hassall while the music was composed by Michael Sayer and arranged by Jack Beaver and played by his orchestra (Beaver is better known as the soundtrack composer to several of Alfred Hitchcock's 1930 films).

Hercule Poirot was played by Anthony Holles and The Yellow Iris marked the debut of the character on radio (he had already been portrayed on stage, film and television).

This unusual experiment was not deemed a success by some of the critics. Joyce Grenfell reviewed the play in The Observer's edition of 7 November 1937 when she said, "I had hoped to say such nice things about Agatha Christie's Yellow Iris" but found that Holles was, "the only happy thing in the broadcast". Overall she said that, "The play itself turned out to be a ten-minute sketch padded with cabaret and dance music, and made to spread over forty minutes. When the sketch was playing my interest was sustained. But the sequences were so brief and the intervening music – though good in its proper place – so prolonged that my attention wandered. Much better to have treated the piece as the short sketch it really was."

The Guardian's unnamed radio critic reviewed the first performance of the play in the edition of 3 November 1937 when he said, "Since the play took place in a cabaret and the cabaret was given a full and overflowing part with lyrics and music, and more lyrics and more music, it must be confessed that there was not much of a detective thrill left. Poirot had a nice French accent; but the course of the plot was much entangled with music and so was most of the conversation; whenever things got going they were held up for a while, and altogether this musical version of The Yellow Iris lacked the clarity which distinguishes Agatha Christie's writing in her books. Let the drama department as a general rule keep crime and cabaret apart; the mixture is apt to curdle."

Cast:
Anthony Holles as Hercule Poirot
Sydney Keith as Barton Russell
Evelyn Neilson as Pauline Weatherby
Dino Galvani as Luigi, Maitre d'Hotel
Frank Drew as Anthony Chappell
Martita Hunt as Senora Lola Valdez
Peter Scott as Stephen Carter
Audrey Cameron as The Cloak Room Attendant
Bernard Jukes as The Waiter

The script of the play is published by Samuel French, separately, and in the collection Poirot Double Bill with another short play "The Wasp's Nest". The short story on which it is based was first published in book form in the US in The Regatta Mystery and Other Short Stories in July 1939 and in the UK in Problem at Pollensa Bay and Other Stories in 1991. It was adapted for television by Anthony Horowitz and directed by Peter Barber-Fleming as part of the ITV series Agatha Christie's Poirot in 1993, starring David Suchet. The short story was later expanded by Christie into the 1945 full-length novel Sparkling Cyanide.
