= The Mystery of the Blue Train =

1928 mystery novel by Agatha Christie

- Dust-jacket illustration of the first UK edition
- Author: Agatha Christie
- Translator: Mystery
- Cover artist: C. Morse (pseudonym of Salomon van Abbé)
- Language: English
- Series: Hercule Poirot
- Genre: Mystery
- Publisher: William Collins & Sons
- Publication date: 29 March 1928
- Publication place: United Kingdom
- Media type: Print (hardback & paperback)
- Pages: 296 pp (first edition, hardcover)
- Preceded by: The Big Four
- Followed by: Black Coffee (play); Peril at End House (novel)
- Text: The Mystery of the Blue Train online

The Mystery of the Blue Train is a mystery novel by British writer Agatha Christie, first published in the United Kingdom by William Collins & Sons on 29 March 1928 and in the United States by Dodd, Mead and Company later in the same year. The UK edition retailed at seven shillings and sixpence (7/6) and the US edition at $2.00. The book features her detective Hercule Poirot.

The novel concerns the murder of an American heiress on Le Train Bleu, the titular "Blue Train". The novel entered the public domain in the United States in 2024; however, it will still be copyrighted in the United Kingdom until 1 January 2047, 70 years after the death of Agatha Christie.

== Plot summary ==
Poirot boards Le Train Bleu, bound for the French Riviera. So does Katherine Grey, who is having her first winter out of England, after recently receiving a relatively large inheritance. On board the train Grey meets Ruth Kettering, an American heiress leaving her unhappy marriage to meet her lover. The next morning, though, Ruth is found dead in her compartment, a victim of strangulation.

The famous ruby, "Heart of Fire", which had recently been given to Ruth by her father, is discovered to be missing. Ruth's father, American millionaire Rufus Van Aldin, and his secretary, Major Knighton, persuade Poirot to take on the case. Ruth's maid, Ada Mason, says that she saw a man in Ruth's compartment but could not see who he was. The police suspect that Ruth's lover, the Comte de la Roche, killed her and stole the ruby, but Poirot does not think that the Comte is guilty. He is suspicious of Ruth's estranged husband, Derek Kettering, who was on the same train but claims not to have seen Ruth. Katherine says that she saw Derek enter Ruth's compartment. Further suspicion is thrown on Derek when a cigarette case with the letter "K" is found there.

Poirot investigates and finds out that the murder and the jewel theft might not be connected, as the famous jewel thief "The Marquis" is connected to the crime. Eventually, the avaricious Mirelle, who was on the train with Derek—with whom she had been having an affair but, now spurned, is seeking revenge against him—tells Poirot she saw Derek leave Ruth's compartment around the time the murder would have taken place. Derek is then arrested. Everyone is convinced the case is solved, but Poirot is not sure. He does more investigating and learns more information, talking to his friends and to Katherine, eventually coming to the truth.

He asks Van Aldin and Knighton to come with him on the Blue Train to recreate the murder. He tells them that Ada Mason is really Kitty Kidd, a renowned male impersonator and actress. Katherine saw what she thought was a boy getting off the train, but it was really Mason. Poirot realised that Mason was the only person claiming to have seen anyone with Ruth in the compartment, so this could have been a lie. He reveals that the murderer and Mason's accomplice is Knighton, who is really the ruthless "Marquis". He also says that the cigarette case with the K on it does not stand for 'Kettering', but for 'Knighton'. Since Knighton was supposedly in Paris, no one would have suspected him. Derek did go into the compartment to talk to Ruth once he saw she was on the train, but he left when he saw she was asleep. The police arrest Knighton and the case is closed.

== Characters ==
- Hercule Poirot, a private detective
- Rufus Van Aldin, the American millionaire, Ruth's father
- Ruth Kettering, Van Aldin's only daughter, Derek's wife
- Hon Derek Kettering, Van Aldin's son-in-law, Ruth's husband
- Mirelle, a Parisian dancer, Derek's gold-digging and later vengeful French lover
- Major Richard Knighton, Van Aldin's secretary
- Ada Beatrice Mason, Ruth Kettering's maid
- Comte Armand de la Roche, Ruth's swindling lover
- Monsieur Carrège, of French police
- Commissary Caux, of French police
- Mr. Goby, Rufus' informant
- Katherine Grey, formerly companion to the recently deceased Mrs Harfield, who has left her entire estate to Grey
- Dr. Harrison, friend of Katherine from the village of St. Mary Mead
- Mrs. Harrison, wife of the doctor, and friend of Katherine from the same village
- Amelia Viner, an elderly, terminally ill spinster and friend of Katherine Grey in St Mary Mead
- Rosalie Tamplin, Viscountess cousin of Katherine, owner of a villa on the Riviera
- Lenox Tamplin, Lady Tamplin's daughter
- Charles Evans, Lady Tamplin's much younger husband
- Demetrius Papopolous, jewellery dealer and an acquaintance of Poirot
- Zia Papopolous, daughter of Demetrius
- Pierre Michel, a conductor on the Blue Train; a character by the same name later appeared as a conductor in Murder on the Orient Express
- Joseph Aarons, Poirot's acquaintance, an expert in people involved in the "dramatic profession" (acting) who advises Poirot about the skilled impersonator Kitty Kidd, known by a different name for most of the novel
- Boris Ivanovitch
- Olga Demiroff
- Alice
- Ellen

== Influence and significance ==
The novel's plot is based on the 1923 Poirot short story "The Plymouth Express" (later collected in book form in the US in 1951 in The Under Dog and Other Stories and in the UK in 1974 in Poirot's Early Cases).

The novel "also contains a number of firsts", which include "reference to the fictional village of St. Mary Mead... [later] the home of Agatha Christie's detective Miss Marple", in this work, the home of the character, Katherine Grey. (This location also appears in "The Tuesday Night Club", published in December 1927, the first short story to feature Miss Marple.) Also firsts were "appearance of Poirot's valet, George" and "of the minor recurring character, Mr Goby, who would also appear in After the Funeral and Third Girl".

Mere months after this novel was published, prolific French novelist Arthur Bernède published Le mystère du train bleu, in 1928. A murder mystery adventure featuring Bernède's own popular detective, Chantecoq, the story is set in Paris and the plot is completely different.

== Literary significance and reception ==
The Times Literary Supplement gave a more positive reaction to the book than Christie herself in its issue of 3 May 1928. After recounting the set-up of the story, the reviewer concluded: "The reader will not be disappointed when the distinguished Belgian on psychological grounds... builds up inferences almost out of the air, supports them by a masterly array of negative evidence and lands his fish to the surprise of everyone".

The New York Times Book Review of 12 August 1928, said, "Nominally Poirot has retired, but retirement means no more to him than it does to a prima donna. Let a good murder mystery come within his ken, and he just can't be kept out of it."

British crime writer and critic Robert Barnard declared: "Christie's least favourite story, which she struggled with just before and after the disappearance. The international setting makes for a good varied read, but there is a plethora of sixth-form schoolgirl French and some deleterious influences from the thrillers. There are several fruitier candidates for the title of 'worst Christie'."

== Allusions ==
Allusions to other works in the Christie canon include the following. One of the characters in Death on the Nile recognises Poirot because of his involvement in The Mystery of the Blue Train: "Miss Van Schuyler said: ' I have only just realised who you are, Monsieur Poirot. I may tell you that I have heard of you from my old friend Rufus Van Aldin." That line was retained in the television film, even though Death on the Nile was broadcast first.

The novel features a Wagon Lit conductor called Pierre Michel which is the same name of another Wagon Lit conductor who appears in Murder on the Orient Express – it is never revealed whether these two characters are one and the same or different.

The titular Blue Train appears again in Three Act Tragedy where Poirot boards the train with Sir Charles Cartwright to return to England.

== Adaptations ==
=== Television ===
The novel was adapted for television in 2006, a special episode of the series Agatha Christie's Poirot, airing on ITV on 1 January. It was adapted by Guy Andrews and directed by Hettie Macdonald (who would later direct Curtain: Poirot's Last Case), and starred David Suchet as Poirot. Also featured were Roger Lloyd-Pack as Inspector Caux, James D'Arcy as Derek Kettering, Lindsay Duncan as Lady Tamplin, Alice Eve as Lenox and Elliott Gould as Rufus Van Aldin. It was "[r]eset in the late 1930s to match the rest of the Poirot TV series".

==== Changes from the novel ====
The television film includes several changes from the original novel. To tie in with the rest of the series, the setting is changed to the late 1930s. Additionally, Ruth's lover is travelling on the train with her, and they are both fleeing her husband. Lady Tamplin, Corky and her daughter Lenox also travel on the blue train. Ruth becomes friends with Katherine Grey. They switch train compartments, and when Ruth is bludgeoned to death, making her features unrecognisable, Poirot speculates that the intended victim may have been Katherine. Rufus, Ruth's father, has a wife in the film, who became insane after Ruth's birth, and Rufus has ensured her (his wife's) safekeeping at a convent, where she has become a nun. The character of Mirelle is changed to be Rufus's mistress, who visits Rufus's wife. She is mistaken by Rufus's wife to be her daughter Ruth. Additional changes in the film include Ada Mason trying to kill Katherine (because Knighton had fallen in love with Katherine and Ada was jealous). Katherine is saved by Lenox jumping on Mason and biting her on the neck. At the end of the film, the murderer, Major Richard Knighton, commits suicide by having himself run over by an oncoming train, instead of just being arrested by the French police as in the novel. The television film also shows Lady Tamplin's fourth husband (Corky by name) acquiring a ruby for her. In the book, Lady Tamplin's fourth husband is named "Chubby", and he has nothing to do with the ruby.

In the end, Katherine expresses a desire to travel, saying that she intends to take the Orient Express from Vienna. She asks Poirot if he has taken that train, and he says he has not. However, in a bit of foreshadowing, Poirot says that he would like to take the Orient Express someday, while Katherine talks about the romance of the train.

=== Radio ===
The Mystery of the Blue Train was adapted for radio by BBC Radio 4, with Maurice Denham as Poirot, which was broadcast in six parts weekly, 29 December 1985—2 February 1986. This was the first of the adaptations of Poirot novels by BBC Radio.

=== Graphic novel ===
A graphic novel with the content of this Christie work was published in 2005, in French, entitled Le train bleu, from Emmanuel Proust éditions. The Mystery of the Blue Train was released by HarperCollins as a graphic novel on 3 December 2007, adapted and illustrated by Marc Piskic. This was translated from the edition first published in France.

== Publication history ==
- 1928, William Collins and Sons (London), 29 March 1928, Hardcover, 296 pp
- 1928, Dodd Mead and Company (New York), 1928, Hardcover, 306 pp
- 1932, William Collins and Sons, February 1932 (As part of the Agatha Christie Omnibus of Crime along with The Murder of Roger Ackroyd, The Seven Dials Mystery and The Sittaford Mystery), Hardcover (Priced at seven shillings and sixpence)
- 1940, Pocket Books (New York), Paperback, 276 pp
- 1948, Penguin Books, Paperback, (Penguin number 691), 250 pp
- 1954, Pan Books, Paperback (Pan number 284)
- 1956, Pocket Books (New York), Paperback, 194 pp
- 1958, Fontana Books (Imprint of HarperCollins), Paperback, 248 pp
- 1972, Greenway edition of collected works (William Collins), Hardcover, 286 pp, ISBN 0-00-231524-6
- 1973, Greenway edition of collected works (Dodd Mead), Hardcover, 286 pp, ISBN 0-396-06817-0
- 1974, Dodd, Mead and Company (As part of the Murder on Board along with Death in the Clouds and What Mrs. McGillicuddy Saw!), Hardcover, 601 pp, ISBN 0-396-06992-4
- 1976, Ulverscroft Large-print Edition, Hardcover, 423pp, OCLC 2275078
- 2006, Easton Press, Hardcover/Leather, 278 pp
- 2007, Poirot Facsimile Edition (Facsimile of 1928 UK First Edition), HarperCollins, 5 March 2007, Hardback ISBN 0-00-723438-4

== Circumstances of its writing ==
As described by the staff of Agatha Christie Limited,

The writing of this book (part of which took place on the Canary Islands in early 1927) was an ordeal for Agatha Christie. The events of 1926 with the death of her mother and her husband's infidelity had left a deep psychological scar on Christie. Now separated from Archie and in need of funds, she turned back to writing... The story itself, even though derived from the 1923 Poirot short story The Plymouth Express, did not come easily to her and she referred to this novel in her autobiography stating that she "always hated it".

It later had an effect on her in the midst of wartime when, nervous that at some future point she might be in need of funds and need a fallback, she wrote Sleeping Murder and locked it securely in a bank vault for future publication. Curtain was written at the same time and similarly locked away, but publication of this latter book would not be possible until the end of her writing career, as it recounts the death of Poirot.

== Serialization ==
The Mystery of the Blue Train was first serialized in the London evening newspaper The Star in thirty-eight un-illustrated instalments from Wednesday 1 February to Thursday 15 March 1928. The entire first two chapters were omitted from the serialization and it therefore contained only thirty-four chapters. There were slight amendments to the text, either to make sense of the openings of an instalment (e.g. changing "She then..." to "Katherine then..."), or omitting small sentences or words, especially in the opening instalment where several paragraphs were omitted. A reference to the continental Daily Mail at the start of chapter six (chapter eight in the book) was changed to "the newspaper" to avoid mentioning a competitor to The Star. Three chapters were given different names: chapter nine (eleven in the book) was called Something Good instead of Murder, chapter twenty-six (twenty-eight in the book) was called Poirot hedges instead of Poirot plays the Squirrel and chapter twenty-eight (chapter thirty in the book) was called Katherine's letters instead of Miss Viner gives judgement. The final chapter, called By the Sea in the book, was unnamed in the serialization.

=== Book dedication ===
Christie's dedication of the read, "To the two distinguished members of the O.F.D. – Carlotta and Peter", which, according to Agatha Christie Limited Staff and others, references the "difficult time" in 1926 of her mother's death and her husband's infidelity, and where "O.F.D." refers to the "Order of the Faithful Dogs". That camp included "Carlotta [Charlotte Fisher], hired by Christie as a secretary and Rosalind's governess, and Peter, Rosalind's much loved dog". They were juxtaposed with "the Order of the Faithless Rats", individuals that turned away from her during that time.

The particulars related to the dedication are these. Christie's mother died on 5 April; also referenced are the breakdown of her marriage to Archibald Christie, and her famous ten-day disappearance in December that year. These were events which disturbed her for the remainder of her life, and Christie learned that people she expected to be allies in her time of need turned away from her. One person who didn't was Charlotte Fisher (born c. 1901 – died 1976), who had been employed by Christie in 1924 as both her own secretary and as a governess to her daughter Rosalind.

When the events of 1926 were starting to recede, Christie states that she "had to take stock of my friends". She and Fisher (to whom Christie referred affectionately as both "Carlo" and "Carlotta") divided her acquaintances into two separate categories; the Order of Rats and the Order of Faithful Dogs (O.F.D.)—chief among the latter group, Christie put Charlotte Fisher for her steadfast support. Also named in this latter group, and also in the dedication of the book, is Peter, Christie's beloved terrier, who had been purchased for Rosalind in 1924. Peter's devotion to Christie at this time was never forgotten by her and she returned that affection, writing to her second husband, Max Mallowan, in 1930 that "You've never been through a really bad time with nothing but a dog to hold on to."

Peter was also the subject of the dedication of Dumb Witness (on the dustjacket of which he is pictured), published in 1937, one year before his death. Charlotte Fisher, together with her sister Mary, also received a second dedication in a book in And Then There Were None in 1939.
