= The Adventure of the Christmas Pudding =

1960 short story collection by Agatha Christie

- Dust-jacket illustration of the first UK edition
- Author: Agatha Christie
- Cover artist: Not known
- Language: English
- Genre: Crime novel
- Publisher: Collins Crime Club
- Publication date: 24 October 1960
- Publication place: United Kingdom
- Media type: Print (hardback & paperback)
- Pages: 256 pp (first edition, hardback)
- Preceded by: Cat Among the Pigeons
- Followed by: Double Sin and Other Stories

The Adventure of the Christmas Pudding and a Selection of Entrées is a short story collection by the English writer Agatha Christie and first published in the UK by the Collins Crime Club on 24 October 1960. It is the only Christie first edition published in the UK that contains stories with both Hercule Poirot and Miss Marple, the writer's two most famous detectives. It retailed in the UK for twelve shillings and sixpence (12/6) and comprises six cases. It was not published in the US although the stories it contains were published in other volumes there.

== Plot summaries ==
=== The Adventure of the Christmas Pudding, or The Theft of the Royal Ruby ===
Poirot is asked by a Mr Jesmond, who is acting as an intermediary to an eastern prince, to help that unfortunate young man with a problem he is having. The prince is due soon to be married to a cousin.

On his way to be married, he met an attractive but obviously dubious young woman, and rashly decided to have a last fling with her. The prince brought several expensive jewels with him to London for resetting by Cartier and one of them, a fabulous ruby, was stolen by the young woman. If it cannot be retrieved, a scandal will ensue and because of this, the police cannot be involved. The mystery can be solved at an old English country house called Kings Lacey where it will be arranged for Poirot to join a family there for their Christmas celebrations, supposedly to experience a typical English Christmas.

On Christmas Eve, at Kings Lacey, Poirot is told about the other members of their party by Mrs Lacey, his elderly host in the house. Joining them will be her husband, Colonel Lacey; Sarah, a granddaughter by their deceased son; Colin, a teenage grandson by their daughter; Michael, a friend of Colin's at school; Bridget who is of the same age as Colin and Michael and is a great niece of Mrs Lacey's; Diana, a young cousin of Mrs Lacey's; and David Welwyn who is a family friend.

Colonel and Mrs Lacey are perturbed by Sarah's relationship with a young rake called Desmond Lee-Wortley. They both think him unsuitable for their granddaughter and have invited him to join them for Christmas, in the hope that a few days' close contact with Sarah will show her how unsuitable he is, particularly in contrast to David Welwyn who has been friends with Sarah since childhood. Lee-Wortley is there with his sister who is recovering from an operation and is confined to her room, convalescing.

Colin, Michael, and Bridget are disappointed with Poirot as he does not meet their expectations of what a detective should look like. They hatch a plan to arrange a false murder for Poirot to detect with Bridget lying in the snow with blood as the "dead" body and footprints leading through the snow which is now falling and expected to grow heavier. They decide that they will put their plan into operation on Boxing Day, as Colonel Lacey would not like something of that nature to take place on Christmas Day itself.

That night, the Christmas tree is decorated and the party retire to their rooms for the night. On his pillow, Poirot finds a scrawled note which reads, "DON'T EAT NONE OF THE PLUM PUDDING. ONE WHO WISHES YOU WELL." He is most puzzled.

The next day, the party eats a huge Christmas dinner, and then the elderly and partly retired butler brings in the Christmas pudding with great ceremony. The diners find the usual tokens in their portions, but the Colonel is annoyed and amazed when he almost chokes on a large ruby in his. Poirot takes the object and pockets it. Afterwards, Poirot visits the kitchen to compliment the daily cook, Mrs Ross, on the meal and particularly the pudding. She confesses that two were made, one for that day and one for New Year's Day, but the one for Christmas Day was dropped and the one for six days later substituted in its place.

That night, Poirot pretends to sleep in his bed, having avoided drinking a drugged coffee which had been handed to him by Lee-Wortley. A figure enters his room and conducts a fruitless search.

The next morning, the children carry out their "murder" plan and rouse Poirot from his bed to investigate the "dead" body but the planners get a shock when Poirot confirms that Bridget is indeed dead, Sarah and Lee-Wortley having joined them in the snow. Poirot invites the young man to check Bridget's pulse and he confirms there is not one.

Poirot points out that the footprints in the snow look like Lee-Wortley's and that Bridget's hand is clutching the ruby found in the pudding. Lee-Wortley is dumbfounded, but takes the ruby and offers to ring for the police. Claiming to Diana that the phone is dead, he drives off to fetch them.

Poirot takes the others in the house where he explains all. He tells them that Lee-Wortley is a blackmailer and involved in other questionable matters. His supposed sister is the young woman who took the ruby from the eastern prince, and the two of them were tracked to Kings Lacey.

Bridget appears in the room — she is not dead, having worn a tourniquet on her arm when lying in the snow, and was in league with Poirot to trick Lee-Wortley. Poirot heard the children planning their "murder" through an open window and used this opportunity to take Lee-Wortley in. Poirot had given the ruby to Bridget for safekeeping on the night that Lee-Wortley tried to drug him, then switched it for a paste copy he had brought with him while arranging the "murder" scene. He supposes that Lee-Wortley will go abroad and receive an unpleasant surprise when he tries to sell the fake. Lee Wortley's "sister" had hidden the real ruby in the New Year's Day pudding, intending that the pair should take it with them when they left, but they were unaware of the accident that befell the one for Christmas Day.

Lee-Wortley's "sister" overhears these revelations and flees the house, furious that he has left her to face the consequences alone. The mystery of who left the note on Poirot's pillow is solved when one of the housemaids confesses that she heard the pair discussing getting Poirot out of the way and that something had been put in the pudding, causing her to think they planned to poison him. He rewards her by promising her a vanity box, and gets a kiss from Bridget under the mistletoe.

=== The Mystery of the Spanish Chest ===
Poirot's attention is caught by newspaper headlines which tell of the latest developments in the "Spanish Chest Mystery". At his request Miss Lemon prepares a précis of the case. A Major Charles Rich held a small party at his flat. The guests were a Mr and Mrs Clayton, a Mr and Mrs Spence and a Commander McLaren. At the last minute, Edward Clayton received an urgent telegram summoning him to Scotland that night on business and did not attend the party. Shortly before the party, he had a drink with McLaren at their club where he explained his coming absence and then before going to the station, took a taxi to Rich's to offer his apologies. Rich was out but Burgess – Rich's manservant – let him in and left Clayton to scribble a note in the sitting room while he carried on his preparations in the kitchen.

Some ten minutes later, Rich returned and sent Burgess out on a short errand. Rich denies seeing Clayton at the flat nor did Burgess after leaving the man to write his note. The party went well. The next morning, Burgess noticed what seemed to be bloodstains on a rug that were seeping from a Spanish chest in the corner of the room. Opening it, the startled man found the dead body of Mr Clayton, who had been stabbed to death.

Rich has now been arrested as the obvious suspect but Poirot sees a flaw in that he cannot see how or why Rich would calmly have gone to bed with a bleeding corpse in the chest. He is able to start investigating the case when a mutual friend recommends him to Mrs Clayton. Upon meeting Clayton's widow, Marguerite, he is struck by her beautiful innocence and realises quickly that she is attracted to Major Rich although she denies having an affair with him. She does admit that she was not in love with her closed and emotionless husband. He then sees each of the people involved in the party in turn who each agree about the charms of Mrs Clayton and the lack of emotion in her husband. Poirot has some suspicions of Burgess and goes to Rich's flat where the manservant shows him the scene of the crime. Inspecting the chest, Poirot finds some holes in the back and side and asks Burgess if anything in the room is noticeably different from the night of the party. He is told that a screen in the room was almost in front of the chest on the night of the murder, concealing it from public view.

Remembering a reference to Othello used by Mrs Spence, Poirot realises the truth. Mr Clayton is Othello and his wife is Desdemona and the missing character of Iago is, in fact, Commander McLaren. He is in love with Mrs Clayton and, jealous of her attraction to Major Rich, planned the perfect crime whereby Clayton would die and Rich be accused of the murder. He had made numerous subtle suggestions to Clayton about his wife's infidelity to the point where the man himself hatched a plan to fake a summons to Scotland and then found a reason to get into Rich's flat where he hid in the chest to observe what happened in his absence during the party.

McLaren, playing records for the people to dance to, nipped behind the screen, knowing that Clayton was staring out of one of the holes in the chest, and murdered Clayton. Poirot feels certain that if the theory is put to McLaren he will confess.

=== The Underdog ===
Sir Reuben Astwell was murdered ten days previously at his country house, Mon Repos, when he was violently hit on the back of the head with a club, and his nephew Charles Leverson has been arrested. Sir Reuben's wife, Lady Astwell, is convinced that the true criminal is the late man's secretary, Owen Trefusis, although she does not have a shred of evidence to back up this claim, relying instead on "intuition". She sends her young companion, Lily Margrave, to Poirot to employ him on the case and Poirot accepts, partly because he senses that Lily does not want Poirot to investigate the matter and that she has something to hide.

Arriving at Mon Repos Poirot speaks with the daunting and domineering Lady Astwell who tells him that Sir Reuben's brother and business partner, Victor, is also a guest in the house. Both brothers were equally as hot-tempered as the other and there were many rows and disagreements in the house, quite often involving Charles Leverson, with Sir Reuben often taking his temper out on the servants. Poirot interviews Parsons, the butler, who is one of the main witnesses in the case. His bedroom is on the ground floor and above him is the "Tower Room", Sir Reuben's sanctum. It is a lofty room with another room above reached by a spiral staircase and was originally an observatory built by a previous owner who was an astronomer. Sir Reuben was writing late at night and Parsons was asleep when he was awakened by the sound of Leverson returning home near midnight and letting himself in. He heard Leverson shouting at his uncle followed by a cry and a dull thud. About to go upstairs to see what was happening, Parsons then heard Leverson saying "No harm done, luckily" and then wishing his uncle goodnight. The next day, Sir Reuben was found dead. Speaking with Trefusis, the somewhat meek man admits that during his nine years employment, he was ruthlessly bullied by Sir Reuben. Trefusis shows Poirot the scene of the crime and the detective is puzzled as to why there is a bloodstain on the writing desk but Sir Reuben's body was found on the floor. Poirot tries an experiment with his valet, George, and realises that Sir Reuben was clubbed as he sat in his chair and remained in position afterwards as the chair is low-down in comparison to the desk.

Poirot is more suspicious than ever of Lily Margrave's nervous demeanour and investigates the two local hotels to see if anyone was staying that night who left the hotel near midnight. He finds such a man – Captain Humphrey Naylor – and convinced there is a link with Lily sets a trap by putting his own blood on a scrap of the dress that she was wearing that night and telling her he found it in the Tower Room. She confesses that she is Naylor's sister and that he was swindled out of an African gold mine by Sir Reuben. Determined to find proof she agreed with her brother to take employment as Lady Astwell's companion and on the night in question, as her brother waited outside, she went to the Tower Room and saw Leverson leaving it. She then went into the room herself and found the body on the floor (she also rifled the safe and found the proof of the swindle her brother was after) but she is innocent of the crime of murder. Poirot believes her and also realises that Leverson was drunk on the night in question and his strange manner is as a result of starting to shout at his uncle, pushing his shoulder and then realising he was dead as the body slid to the floor – hence the thud that Parsons heard. He is innocent as well, as his uncle was killed earlier than when he was in the room.

Poirot persuades Lady Astwell to partake in hypnosis to recall events of the night of the murder. She confirms what she has already told the police – that she argued with her husband in the Tower Room some ten minutes prior to Leverson coming back home. She also manages to recall a subliminal memory of the normally-controlled Trefusis breaking a paper knife in anger earlier in the evening when again being shouted at by Sir Reuben (thus triggering her suspicions of the man) and a strange bulge in the curtain which covered the spiral staircase to the upper portion of the tower room. Poirot realises someone was already there when she and her husband were arguing.

Poirot begins a game of nerves with everyone in the house, extending his stay and searching everyone's bedrooms, much to their annoyance. He also claims to find something on the spiral staircase which will seal the murderer's fate and leaves it in a box in his room while he makes a quick trip to London. He returns and tells the gathered household that Trefusis is indeed the murderer but the crime was not premeditated. The secretary had left something in the upper portion of the Tower Room and was fetching it when he found himself to be an unwilling witness to the row between Sir Reuben and Lady Astwell. After she left the room, he tried to sneak out but was spotted and received another barrage of abuse from his employer. After nine years of such treatment, he was unable to take any more and struck Sir Reuben down. The item Poirot found on the stairs was false but George, hidden in the wardrobe of Poirot's room, saw Trefusis steal the box in which the item was hidden when Poirot was in London. Lady Astwell is delighted – her intuition has proven correct.

=== Four and Twenty Blackbirds ===
Poirot is eating out with a friend, Henry, and the conversation turns to people's habits. Henry eats regularly in the restaurant that they are in and he points out a white-bearded man as evidence of his theories. This bearded man eats the same meal there on Wednesday and Saturday and always orders much the same items as part of his three-course meal. The waitress brings their meals and sees Henry staring at the bearded man. She tells him that except the previous week he also came in on Monday and ordered things he had never ordered before. Poirot's curiosity is piqued.

Three weeks later, Poirot and Henry meet on a tube train and during the conversation Henry mentions that the bearded man has not been seen for a week. Henry's theory is that he has died and his change of habits on the Monday in question was as a result of being told bad news by his doctor. Poirot is not certain and starts to investigate. He easily finds the man's name from a list of recent deaths, and with a suitable introduction, meets the dead man's doctor. The man lived alone and died after an accidental fall downstairs at his house and was found near the milk bottles. He died at approximately 10.00 p.m. on that day and had eaten a meal a couple of hours before, at the same restaurant Poirot saw him in. He had a letter in the pocket. In response to the question of relatives, Poirot is told that the man had a twin brother, Anthony, who died on the afternoon of the same day as his brother after a long illness and that their only surviving relative is a nephew, George Lorrimer. Poirot is interested in the dead man's teeth and it is confirmed that they were very white for their age.

After several calls of investigation, Poirot meets Lorrimer and accuses him of murder. Lorrimer's response proves the accusation has hit home.

Meeting Henry again, Poirot explains: Anthony left a large fortune to his (dead, but estranged) brother. Lorrimer would eventually inherit but was impatient for the money. He actually murdered him, and then in disguise, he impersonated his uncle at the restaurant. However, he forgot to impersonate his uncle's eating habits and ordered different foods to those usually chosen, including blackberry tart for dessert. His uncle did not eat food which stained the teeth whereas Lorrimer's teeth are stained.

=== The Dream ===
Poirot is summoned by letter to the home of reclusive and eccentric millionaire Benedict Farley. He is shown into the office of Farley's personal secretary, Hugo Cornworthy, but finds the millionaire himself alone in the darkened room. Poirot is made to sit in the light of a bright desk lamp and he is unimpressed with the man, dressed in an old patchwork dressing gown and wearing thick glasses, feeling that the scene is stagy and the man a charlatan who does not possess the strength of character that he would expect from such a rich and powerful person. Farley tells him that he is troubled by a nightly dream in which he is seated at his desk in the next room and at exactly 3.28 p.m., he takes out the revolver he keeps in his desk drawer and shoots himself. Various doctors have been unable to explain this to him, and he has now turned to the famous detective. Poirot wonders if he has enemies who would want to kill him, but Farley knows of no one. Poirot asks to see the room where the dream is set, but Farley refuses and Poirot therefore takes his leave. Before he goes Farley asks him for the letter he sent him to be returned, and Poirot hands it over but then realises he handed over the wrong one and Farley did not notice. The correct letter is exchanged.

A week later, an acquaintance, Dr Stillingfleet, phones Poirot and tells him that Farley has shot himself. Poirot goes to the house and meets the doctor, a police inspector, the dead man's second wife, his daughter from his first marriage, Joanna, and Hugo Cornworthy in whose office Poirot had had his meeting with Farley. Poirot tells them all of the reason for the previous visit. There is surprise on the part of some members of the party, but Mrs Farley was told by her husband of the dreams, and she confirms that he kept a revolver in his desk drawer. Her husband seems to have killed himself in precisely the way and at the time the dream foretold. Two visitors were outside his room waiting to see him. Farley spoke to them briefly to tell them he would not be long and then went inside his room. After a considerable period of time, Cornworthy went in and found the dead body. No one could enter the room in the interim. There is a window with no climbable ledge, facing a blank wall.

Poirot feels that the wall is important. He examines the room and finds a pair of extendable tongs which capture his interest. He asks various questions of the people gathered there, one of which is to ascertain if Farley had bad eyesight without his glasses and he is told he had.

Poirot has the solution: On his previous visit, he did not see Farley but a disguised Cornworthy, who had written the letter himself and instructed the butler to bring Poirot to his room. Cornworthy wore a spare pair of Farley's glasses, which left him unable to see that Poirot had initially returned the wrong letter. He stole the tongs and revolver from Farley's room, leaned out of his window, and used the tongs to hold a stuffed toy cat in front of Farley's adjoining window as a distraction. When Farley leaned out to see, Cornworthy shot him, unseen by anyone due to the blank wall and unheard over the noise of passing traffic. He left the man dead for a short while and then went to "find" the body, planting the revolver there and returning the tongs. He and Mrs Farley had conspired to commit the murder so that she would inherit £250,000 and the two could be together; she was the only other person who claimed the dreams were real and who knew about the revolver in her husband's desk. She gives away her guilt by attempting to attack Poirot in a fit of rage, but Stillingfleet pulls her away.

=== Greenshaw's Folly ===
Writer Raymond West, the nephew of Miss Marple, shows Horace Bindler, a literary critic, round the grounds of a local hall popularly known as "Greenshaw's Folly". It was built in the 1860s or 1870s by a man who had made an immense fortune but had little idea of architectural style, the house being a strange mish mash of buildings from around the world. Although strictly speaking they are trespassing, they are nevertheless welcomed by Miss Greenshaw, the elderly granddaughter of the man who built the house, when they come across her in her garden. She is a sharp, slightly shrewish woman who keeps her staff of two in order. They are Mrs Cresswell, her companion, and Alfred, a young gardener who is constantly in dispute with Mrs Cresswell. Miss Greenshaw takes advantage of the presence of the two visitors to ask them to witness her signature to the will she has just had drawn up. She says that she leaves everything to Mrs Cresswell in lieu of unpaid wages, as Miss Greenshaw is determined that nothing go to her last living relative, her nephew, the son of a roguish man called Harry Fletcher who ran away with one of her sisters. They sign the will in the library where Miss Greenshaw shows them the copious diaries of her grandfather and expresses a wish to have them edited and published, but says she has not the time to undertake such a task. The two visitors take their leave, slightly puzzled by a comment from Miss Greenshaw about the time: if you want to know the time, ask a policeman.

When discussing the visit later in the company of Miss Marple, Joan West and her niece, Louise Oxley, the latter offers to undertake the work of editing the diaries while Miss Marple ponders the similarity between Miss Greenshaw and a Mr Naysmith who liked to give false impressions for fun, sometimes leading to trouble. Louise Oxley is employed to work on the diaries and begins work at Miss Greenshaw's house. The next day she is asked to invite the old lady's estranged nephew, Nathaniel Fletcher, to lunch, but is told not to inform Miss Cresswell. When told of this, Raymond suspects a reconciliation and a change in the will may ensue. The day after, on arriving at the house, Louise is struck by the resemblance between Alfred and a portrait of Miss Greenshaw's grandfather. She is working on the diaries at midday in her first-floor room when she hears a scream from the garden, and sees Miss Greenshaw staggering towards the house with an arrow embedded in her breast. When Louise tries to go down to help Miss Greenshaw as she collapses into the room below her, she finds that she is locked in. A few windows along, Mrs Cresswell shouts that she is in the same predicament. A police constable who arrives a few minutes later frees the women from their respective rooms; he is followed by a police sergeant and then by Nathaniel Fletcher, who arrives for his lunch appointment.

That evening, Inspector Welch interviews Raymond about the will he witnessed. Miss Marple guesses correctly that, contrary to what Raymond and Horace Bindler were told, Mrs Cresswell was not the beneficiary to the will – Miss Greenshaw was playing her along, behaviour just like that of Mr Naysmith. The recipient of Miss Greenshaw's money is Alfred, who is probably a grandson of one of Miss Greenshaw's grandfather's illegitimate children, hence the resemblance in looks. Alfred is a member of an archery club but has a cast-iron alibi for the time of the murder.

Miss Marple has a hypothesis: that the Miss Greenshaw that Louise met over her two days work was actually Mrs Cresswell in disguise. Miss Greenshaw was unconscious at the time that she was stabbed with the arrow, and the dying person on the lawn that Louise saw was Mrs Cresswell with a false arrow. The first "policeman" who arrived at the house was really Nathaniel Fletcher, Mrs Cresswell's accomplice. Fletcher is an actor who plays the policeman in a staging of the play by James Barrie, A Kiss for Cinderella, and wears his costume from the play. A few minutes later, he appears at the house as himself, acting unaware of the death.

The companion had been briefly locked in her room from which Fletcher freed her; prior to that moment, Mrs Cresswell had been free to impersonate her employer and position Louise as a witness to the "crime". The pair aimed to pin the blame on Alfred, not realising he had gone to the pub for his lunch earlier than usual and, therefore, had an alibi.

When Miss Marple sees the rockery on which the fake Miss Greenshaw had been working has had plants pulled up as well as weeds, something a skilled gardener like Miss Greenshaw would never do, she realises her guess was correct. Alfred inherits "Greenshaw's Folly".

== Literary significance and reception ==
Maurice Richardson of The Observer on 18 December 1960 said, "She has never been at her best in the short form. These six are exceedingly far from masterpieces. Yet they engender a ghost of the old Christmas number euphoria, still, and may ease you during a plethora, or one of those Stations of the Cross on wheels, called railway journeys."

Robert Barnard: "A late collection, with several of the 'long-short' stories which suit Christie well. Less rigorous than her best, however, and the last story, Greenshaw's Folly, has a notable example of Miss Marple's habit of drawing solutions from a hat, with hardly a trace of why or wherefore."

== References to other works ==
- Dr Stillingfleet who plays a role in "The Dream" later appears in the full-length Hercule Poirot mystery, Third Girl.
- Poirot's reference to believing "six impossible things before breakfast" in The Adventure of the Christmas Pudding is a quotation from chapter 5 of Through the Looking-Glass by Lewis Carroll when Alice says that she cannot believe in impossible things and the White Queen replies that she has not had enough practice and that she, "always did it for half-an-hour a day. Why, sometimes I've believed as many as six impossible things before breakfast".

== Adaptations ==
=== Television ===
All five of the Poirot stories were adapted for television as part of the series Agatha Christie's Poirot.

"The Adventure of the Christmas Pudding" was adapted under the American name "The Theft of the Royal Ruby". The story was slightly altered. The entire family, including the thieves, discovers the ruby in the pudding during Christmas dinner, and Poirot, pretending that it is a fake, takes it to safeguard it in his room. When Bridget is apparently murdered, Poirot places the real ruby, not a paste one, in the supposedly dead girl's hand. Lee-Wortley makes off with it, together with Iris Moffat, a girlfriend who has been pretending to be his sister Gloria. (Moffatt had previously stolen the jewel while on a date with Prince Farouk of Egypt.) Lee-Wortley does not abandon Moffatt to "face the music", as he does in the story. The two thieves try to make their getaway in a private plane which crashes into a field after a pursuit from David (who mistakenly believes Sarah is running off with Lee-Wortley). Poirot and the police are also there. The criminals, unhurt, are both arrested on the spot and the ruby is returned to the Prince. It is only afterwards that Poirot explains what has really been going on to the family. Bridget says goodbye to him at the end along with the others, but does not kiss him under the mistletoe.

"The Mystery of the Spanish Chest" had been adapted from the short version of the story titled "The Mystery of the Baghdad Chest". The adaptation is quite faithful to the short story except adding flashback to how Maclaren—now renamed Colonel Curtiss—got a scar on his face and an end duel between him and Major Rich.

"The Under Dog" adaptation is faithful to the original story. The only changes to the story are replacing Inspector Miller with Captain Hastings and valet George with Miss Lemon. There is also an additional motive to Sir Reuben's murder at the hands of Trefusis, whose first name is changed to Horace.

"Four and Twenty Blackbirds" had a few changes from the original stories. Captain Hastings, Chief Inspector Japp and Miss Lemon are added to the story. George Lorrimer is a theatre manager, unlike in the short story where he is a doctor. The death of Anthony Gascoine is shown and it is shown that Anthony had a housekeeper. Henry Gascoine was not married, whereas in the short story his wife came to London to be present for the will reading after his death.

"The Dream" is adapted as tenth and last episode of Agatha Christie's Poirot series one. The adaptation had a few changes. Captain Hastings and Miss Lemon are added to the story. Inspector Barnett had been replaced by recurring character Chief Inspector Japp. After Poirot's denouement, Hugo Cornworthy tried to escape and got into a fight with Hastings, but was caught by Joanna Farley's boyfriend Herbert.

"Greenshaw's Folly" was adapted as part of the sixth series of Agatha Christie's Marple, starring Julia McKenzie. The plot element of "The Thumb Mark of St. Peter" was woven into the adaptation.

=== Radio ===
"The Adventure of the Christmas Pudding" was adapted for radio by Michael Bakewell and broadcast on BBC Radio 4 on 25 December 2004 with John Moffatt in the role of Poirot.

=== Anime ===
"The Adventure of the Christmas Pudding" and "Four and Twenty Blackbirds" have been turned into anime, in the series Agatha Christie's Great Detectives Poirot and Marple (2004), episode 19 and 20.

== Publication history ==
- 1960, Collins Crime Club (London), 24 October 1960, Hardback, 255 pp
- 1963, Fontana (Imprint of HarperCollins), Paperback, 224 pp
- 2009, HarperCollins; Facsimile edition, Hardcover: 256 pages; ISBN 978-0-00-731352-5

=== First publication of stories ===
- "The Under Dog" was first published in the UK in The London Magazine in October 1926 although its first printing was in the US in Volume 8, Number 6 of The Mystery Magazine in April 1926. The story's first appearance in book form was in the UK in 2 New Crime Stories, published by The Reader's Library in September 1929 (the other story in the volume was "Blackman's Wood" by E. Phillips Oppenheim).
- "The Mystery of the Spanish Chest" is an expanded version of the story "The Mystery of the Baghdad Chest" which appeared in issue 493 of the Strand Magazine in January 1932. The original shorter version was reprinted in book form in the UK collection While the Light Lasts and Other Stories in 1997. The first publication of the expanded version was in three instalments in Women's Illustrated from 17 September to 1 October 1960 with illustrations by Zelinksi. In the US, the shorter version was published in the Ladies Home Journal in January 1932 and the expanded version appeared in the US in The Harlequin Tea Set in 1997.

2 New Crime Stories from 1929: the Reader's Library book which first published in book form the 1926 short story "The Under Dog".

- "The Dream" was first published in the UK in the Strand Magazine in issue 566 in February 1938.
- "Four and Twenty Blackbirds" was first published in the UK in the Strand Magazine in issue 603 in March 1941 under the title of "Poirot and the Regular Customer" and its first printing was in the US in the 9 November 1940 (Volume 106, Number 19)issue of Collier's magazine.
- "Greenshaw's Folly" was first published in the UK in the Daily Mail, 3–7 December 1956.
- "The Adventure of the Christmas Pudding" is an expanded version of the story of the same name which appeared in issue 1611 of The Sketch magazine on 12 December 1923. The original shorter version was first printed in book form in the UK in two obscure collections Problem at Pollensa Bay and Christmas Adventure (Todd 1943) and Poirot Knows the Murderer (Polybooks 1946) and it was reprinted in book form under the title "Christmas Adventure" in the UK collection While the Light Lasts and Other Stories in 1997 and in the US collection Midwinter Murder in 2020. The expanded version appeared after publication of the book in the weekly magazine Women's Illustrated from 24 December 1960 to 7 January 1961 under the alternative title of "The Theft of the Royal Ruby" with illustrations by Zelinksi. The story first appeared in the US in Double Sin and Other Stories in 1961 also under the title of "The Theft of the Royal Ruby" with some slight revisions to the UK version.

=== US book appearances of stories ===
- "The Mystery of the Baghdad Chest" (the earlier version of "The Mystery of the Spanish Chest") and "The Dream" appeared in The Regatta Mystery.
- "The Under Dog" appeared in The Under Dog and Other Stories.
- "Four-and-Twenty Blackbirds" appeared in Three Blind Mice and Other Stories.

== See also ==
- List of Christmas-themed literature
