= Double Sin and Other Stories =

1961 collection by Agatha Christie

- Dust-jacket illustration of the first US edition
- Author: Agatha Christie
- Language: English
- Genre: Detective fiction short stories
- Publisher: Dodd, Mead and Company
- Publication date: 1961
- Publication place: United Kingdom; United States
- Media type: Print (hardback & paperback)
- Pages: 247 pp
- Preceded by: The Adventure of the Christmas Pudding
- Followed by: The Pale Horse

Double Sin and Other Stories is a short story collection by the English writer Agatha Christie and first published in the US by Dodd, Mead and Company in 1961 and retailed for $3.50. The collection contains eight short stories and was not published in the UK; however all of the stories were published in other UK collections (see UK book appearances of stories below).

== List of stories ==
- Double Sin
- Wasp's Nest
- The Theft of the Royal Ruby (also known as The Adventure of the Christmas Pudding)
- The Dressmaker's Doll
- Greenshaw's Folly
- The Double Clue
- The Last Seance
- Sanctuary

== Publication history ==
- 1961, Dodd Mead and Company (New York), Hardcover, 247 pp.
- 1962, Pocket Books (New York), Paperback, (Pocket number 6144), 181 pp.
- 1964, Dell Books, Paperback, 191 pp.

=== First publication of stories in the United States ===
- The Double Clue: August 1925 (Volume 41, Number 4) issue of the Blue Book Magazine with an uncredited illustration.
- The Last Seance: November 1926 issue of Ghost Stories magazine under the title The Woman Who Stole a Ghost.
- Wasp's Nest: 9 March 1929 issue of Detective Story Magazine under the title The Worst of All.
- Double Sin: 30 March 1929 issue of Detective Story Magazine under the title By Road or Rail.
- Sanctuary: serialised in the weekly newspaper supplement This Week magazine in two instalments from 12 to 19 September 1954 under the title Murder at the Vicarage (not to be confused with the novel of the same name) with illustrations by Robert Fawcett.
- Greenshaw's Folly: March 1957 (Volume 29, Number 3) issue of Ellery Queen's Mystery Magazine, unillustrated.
- The Dressmaker's Doll: June 1959 (Volume 33, Number 6) issue of Ellery Queen's Mystery Magazine, unillustrated. The story had previously appeared in Canada in the 25 October 1958 issue of the Star Weekly magazine.
- The Theft of the Royal Ruby: serialised in the weekly newspaper supplement This Week magazine in two instalments from 25 September to 2 October 1960 with illustrations by William A. Smith.

For first publications in the United Kingdom, see below.

=== United Kingdom book appearances of stories ===
The stories contained in Double Sin and Other Stories appear in the following UK collections:

- The Hound of Death (1933): The Last Seance.
- The Adventure of the Christmas Pudding (1960): The Theft of the Royal Ruby (under the title The Adventure of the Christmas Pudding) and Greenshaw's Folly.
- Poirot's Early Cases (1974): Double Sin, Wasp's Nest, and The Double Clue.
- Miss Marple's Final Cases and Two Other Stories (1979): The Dressmaker's Doll and Sanctuary.
