= Sparkling Cyanide =

1945 mystery novel by Agatha Christie

- Dust-jacket illustration of the US (true first) edition. See Publication history (below) for UK first edition jacket image.
- Author: Agatha Christie
- Language: English
- Genre: Crime novel
- Publisher: Dodd, Mead and Company
- Publication date: February 1945
- Publication place: United Kingdom; United States
- Media type: Print (hardcover & paperback)
- Pages: 209 (first edition, hardcover)
- Preceded by: Death Comes as the End
- Followed by: The Hollow

Sparkling Cyanide is a mystery novel by the English writer Agatha Christie, first published in the US by Dodd, Mead and Company in February 1945 under the title Remembered Death and in the UK by the Collins Crime Club in December the same year under Christie's original title. The US edition retailed at $2.00 and the UK edition at eight shillings and sixpence (8/6).

The novel features the last appearance of the recurring character Colonel Race, to solve the mysterious deaths of a married couple, exactly one year apart. The plot of this novel expands the plot of a short story, "Yellow Iris".

== Plot summary ==
One year earlier, seven people had sat down to dinner at the Luxembourg restaurant. One, Rosemary Barton, collapsed and died after drinking champagne laced with cyanide. The coroner ruled her death suicide by poisoning, due to post-flu depression. However, each of the guests had reason to want her dead:

- Iris, Rosemary's sister, had recently learned that she would inherit her sister's great wealth if Rosemary died before her.
- George, Rosemary's husband, had discovered her love letter to another man and her plans to leave her marriage.
- Anthony Browne was a friend of Rosemary who she had accidentally discovered had served time in prison. He was also briefly infatuated with her before becoming attracted to Iris.
- Stephen Farraday had had an affair with Rosemary, but later grew to resent her attachment to him and feared she would destroy his career (he is an MP) and his marriage.
- Sandra, Stephen's wife, had learned of the affair and was worried that her husband would leave her for Rosemary.
- Ruth Lessing, George's secretary, would have been able to marry him if his wife was out of the way. She secretly hated Rosemary.

After Rosemary's death, her aunt Lucilla Drake moves in with George and Iris. She shows blind loyalty to her son, Victor, who is constantly requesting money from the family. Anthony returns to town from travel and forms a friendship with Iris. Six months later, George receives anonymous letters saying that Rosemary was murdered. George investigates and decides to repeat the dinner at the same restaurant, with the same guests, plus an actress who looks like his late wife, and who is meant to arrive late and startle the murderer into making a confession. A few days after the first anniversary of Rosemary's death, the dinner is held, ostensibly to celebrate Iris's eighteenth birthday. The actress does not arrive and George dies at the table – poisoned, like his wife, by cyanide in his champagne. His death might have been judged to be suicide, but George had shared his concerns and some details of his plan with his friend Colonel Race.

Stephen is interrogated by the police, who suspect him of the two murders. However, Colonel Race suspects that Anthony killed Rosemary to silence her and is now pursuing Iris for her wealth, inherited from Rosemary. However, upon meeting him he realises Anthony is not a criminal, but a government agent. Iris confesses to Anthony that, after George's death, she discovered cyanide in her handbag, making it appear that the murderer was attempting to frame her.

After more investigating, Race incorrectly concludes that the murderer is Iris, but Anthony (after a trick with Race's, Anthony's and Chief Inspector Kemp's drinks) has figured out the truth.

Anthony realises that Iris, not George, was the intended victim, and that Ruth had conspired with Victor Drake (who she hoped to marry) to ensure he would inherit the family money. After the entertainment at the restaurant, George proposed a toast to Iris, and all drank champagne except her. When the group left the table to dance, Iris dropped her bag; a young waiter, retrieving it, misplaced it at the seat next to hers. When the group returned to the table in the dark, Iris took the seat where her bag was, not the one she had sat in originally. Everyone else therefore sat one seat away from where they had been. George sat in Iris's original seat and drank the poisoned champagne. The anonymous letters to George were sent by Ruth, who then encouraged him to re-stage the dinner at the Luxembourg so that she and Victor could kill Iris, as they had killed Rosemary. To support a conclusion of suicide, Ruth had planted a packet of cyanide in Iris's bag; when Iris pulled her handkerchief out the packet dropped to the floor without her having touched it, so that there were no fingerprints on it. Victor posed as a waiter in order to drop the poison in the champagne during the show.

When this plot fails, Ruth attempts to run Iris over with a car, which the latter shrugs off as an accident. Colonel Race, together with the police and Anthony, unravels the truth in time to save Iris from Ruth. Her last attempt at killing Iris is to knock her unconscious in her bedroom, then turn on the gas fire and leave the house. Anthony and Colonel Race break into Iris's room in the nick of time and revive her.

Victor is taken in New York at the request of the police and Ruth is caught as well. The case solved, the Farradays reaffirm their love for each other and Iris and Anthony make plans to marry.

== Characters ==
- Rosemary Barton: married to George Barton, who died one year before the main events of the story. She had inherited wealth from her godfather.
- George Barton: Rosemary's husband, fifteen years her senior. He remains Iris's guardian after Rosemary's death.
- Colonel Race: an investigator, and friend of George Barton.
- Iris Marle: teenaged sister of Rosemary. She will receive her inheritance when she turns twenty-one, or when she marries if that is earlier.
- Anthony Browne: AKA Tony Morelli. Boyfriend of Iris, who works to solve the many attempts to kill her.
- Stephen Farraday: rising member of parliament who had a brief but passionate affair with Rosemary.
- Alexandra "Sandra" Farraday: Stephen's wife, formerly the least favoured daughter of a prestigious noble family.
- Lucilla Drake: aunt to Rosemary and Iris, who will inherit if Iris dies childless and unmarried.
- Victor Drake: son of Lucilla Drake, a man with a desire to get money without work.
- Ruth Lessing: young secretary to George. Her name is a pun on the word "ruthless".
- Chloe West: actress hired by George because she bears a passing resemblance to Rosemary.

== Short story vs novel developments ==
The plot of this novel is an expansion of an Hercule Poirot short story entitled "Yellow Iris", first published in the Strand Magazine in July 1937, then in book form in The Regatta Mystery and Other Stories in the US in 1939, and eventually in the UK in Problem at Pollensa Bay in 1991.

The full-length novel has Colonel Race as the central investigative character in place of Poirot, although unlike a Poirot novel, Race is not the one who ultimately solves the mystery. The novel uses the same basic plot elements as the short story (including the method of the poisoning), but changes the identity of the culprit. This was not the first time Christie had made this sort of change when rewriting her own work.

== Literary significance and reception ==
The book was not reviewed in The Times Literary Supplement.

Maurice Richardson, writing in The Observer in 1946, stated,

Agatha Christie readers are divided into two groups: first, fans like me who will put up with any amount of bamboozling for the sake of the pricking suspense, the close finish, six abreast, of the suspect race, and the crashing chord of the trick solution; second, knockers who complain it isn't cricket and anyway there's nothing to it.

Fans, I guarantee will be quite happy with Sparkling Cyanide, a high income group double murder, first of wayward smarty Rosemary, second of dull husband George at his lunatic reconstruction-of-the-crime party. It is too forced to rank with her best Number One form, but the suspect race is up to scratch and readability is high. Making allowances for six years of Spam and cataclysm, quite a credible performance.

The Toronto Daily Star stated in its review that "Suspense is well maintained and suspicion well divided. While this mystery lacks Hercule Poirot, it should nevertheless please all Agatha Christie fans, especially those who like the murders in the fast, sophisticated set."

Robert Barnard, writing in his A Talent to Deceive, said: "Murder in the past, previously accepted as suicide. Upper-class tart gets her come-uppance in smart London restaurant, and husband later suffers the same fate. Compulsively told, the strategies of deception smart as a new pin, and generally well up to 'forties standard. But the solution takes more swallowing than cyanided champagne."

== Adaptations ==
=== TV ===
In 1983, CBS writers Robert Malcolm Young, Sue Grafton and Steven Humphrey adapted the book into a television film, directed by Robert Michael Lewis, set in modern-day California and starring Anthony Andrews as the central character, Tony Browne, with Deborah Raffin as Iris Marle, Pamela Bellwood as Ruth Lessing, Josef Sommer as George Barton, David Huffman and June Chadwick as Stephen and Sandra Farraday, Nancy Marchand as Lucilla Drake, and Christine Belford as Rosemary Barton. The adaptation did not feature Colonel Race.

In 1993, the short story that served as the basis for this novel, "The Yellow Iris", was adapted for television by Anthony Horowitz and directed by Peter Barber-Fleming in an episode of the ITV series Agatha Christie's Poirot starring David Suchet.

In late 2003, the work was loosely adapted by Laura Lamson for ITV1, again in a modern setting, and involving a football manager's wife's murder. In this adaptation Colonel Race was renamed Colonel Geoffrey Reece, and given a partner, his wife Dr Catherine Kendall. The byplay between Reece (played by Oliver Ford Davies) and Kendall (played by Pauline Collins) has been stated to be somewhat similar to Christie's characters Tommy and Tuppence.

In 2013, Sparkling Cyanide was adapted as an episode of the French television series Les Petits Meurtres d'Agatha Christie.

=== Radio ===
In 2012, a three-part adaptation by Joy Wilkinson was broadcast on BBC Radio 4 directed by Mary Peate, with Naomi Frederick as Iris, Amanda Drew as Ruth, Colin Tierney as Anthony, James Lailey as Stephen, Sean Baker as Colonel Race and Jasmine Hyde as Rosemary.

== Publication history ==
Dustjacket illustration of the UK First Edition (Book was first published in the US)

- 1945, Dodd Mead and Company (New York), February 1945, Hardback, 209 pp
- 1945, Collins Crime Club (London), December 1945, Hardback, 160 pp
- 1947, Pocket Books (New York), Paperback (Pocket number 451)
- 1955, Pan Books, Paperback, 159 pp (Pan number 345)
- 1955, Pan Books, Paperback, (Great Pan 156)
- 1960, Fontana Books, Paperback, 160 pp
- 1978, Ulverscroft Large-print Edition, Hardcover, 358 pp; ISBN 0-7089-0223-5
- 2010, HarperCollins; Facsimile edition, Hardcover: 160 pages; ISBN 978-0-00-735470-2

The novel's first true publication was the serialisation in The Saturday Evening Post in eight instalments from 15 July (Volume 216, Number 3) to 2 September 1944 (Volume 217, Number 10) under the title Remembered Death with illustrations by Hy Rubin.

The novel was first serialised, heavily abridged, in the UK in the Daily Express starting on Monday, 9 July 1945 and running for eighteen instalments until Saturday, 28 July 1945. The first instalment carried an uncredited illustration.

No.	Date	Pages No.
14,069	Monday 9 July 1945	2
14,070	Tuesday 10 July 1945	2
14,071	Wednesday 11 July 1945	2
14,072	Thursday 12 July 1945	2
14,073	Friday 13 July 1945	2
14,074	Saturday 14 July 1945	2
14,075	Monday 16 July 1945	2
14,076	Tuesday 17 July 1945	2
14,077	Wednesday 18 July 1945	2
14,078	Thursday 19 July 1945	2
14,079	Friday 20 July 1945	2
14,080	Saturday 21 July 1945	2
14,081	Monday 23 July 1945	2
14,082	Tuesday 24 July 1945	2
14,083	Wednesday 25 July 1945	2
14,084	Thursday 26 July 1945	2
14,085	Friday 27 July 1945	4
14,086	Saturday 28 July 1945	2
