= Parker Pyne Investigates =

1934 short story collection by Agatha Christie

- Dust-jacket illustration of the first UK edition
- Author: Agatha Christie
- Cover artist: Unknown
- Language: English
- Genre: Crime novel
- Publisher: Collins Mystery
- Publication date: November 1934
- Publication place: United Kingdom
- Media type: Print (hardback & paperback)
- Pages: 256 pp (first edition, hardcover)
- Preceded by: Why Didn't They Ask Evans?
- Followed by: Three Act Tragedy

Parker Pyne Investigates is a short story collection written by Agatha Christie and first published in the UK by William Collins and Sons in November 1934. Along with The Listerdale Mystery, this collection did not appear under the usual imprint of the Collins Crime Club but instead appeared as part of the Collins Mystery series. It appeared in the US later in the same year published by Dodd, Mead and Company under the title Mr. Parker Pyne, Detective. The UK edition retailed at seven shillings and sixpence (7/6) and the US edition at $2.00.

The collection comprises twelve of her fourteen stories featuring detective James Parker Pyne; the two remaining stories, "Problem at Pollensa Bay" and "The Regatta Mystery" were later collected in The Regatta Mystery in 1939 in the US and in Problem at Pollensa Bay in the UK in 1991.

The book also features the first appearance of the character of Ariadne Oliver, who would go on to have a working relationship with Hercule Poirot in later books. Also seen very briefly is Pyne's secretary, Miss Lemon. It is a matter of spirited (although usually friendly) debate amongst Christie enthusiasts whether or not this character is meant to be Miss Felicity Lemon, who was later shown to be Poirot's secretary.

== Plot introduction ==
James Parker Pyne is a retired government employee who considers himself to be a "detective of the heart". Advertising his services in the "Personal" column of The Times, he works alongside his secretary Miss Lemon, novelist Ariadne Oliver, handsome "lounge lizard" Claude Luttrell and disguise artist Madeleine de Sara.

The first six stories deal with Pyne solving cases in England, while the second six stories detail Pyne's vacation, where he hopes not to have to do detective work only to end up helping others anyway.

== Plot summaries ==
=== The Case of the Middle-aged Wife ===
Maria Packington contacts Mr Parker Pyne seeking advise about her husband George, who started seeing a young typist named Nancy, but claims there is nothing in their relationship. After paying the hefty fee of two hundred guineas upfront, Mrs Packington is sent to beauty treatment, dress-fitting and elegant lunch, where she is introduced to young and good-looking Claude Lutterell. Something of a whirlwind romance of ten days follows which culminates when Maria and Claude cross paths with George and his girl at a dance. George is jealous and shocked at his wife's behaviour and a couple of days later the two are reconciled. Claude breaks off with Maria, confessing to past life as gigolo using women, and promises to reform and keep in touch through yearly advertisements in newspaper. Mr Pyne, who arranged the adventure with Claude, his associate, comments on his success, as it will give Mrs Packington long-lasting memories of a romance.

=== The Case of the Discontented Soldier ===
Major Charles Wilbraham, previously in service in East Africa, calls at Parker Pyne’s office to find remedy to his boredom in retirement. Pyne arranges for him to visit a house in Friar’s Lane, where the major rescues a young woman, Freda Clegg, from an attack. She was lured into the ambush under the pretense of meeting with a lawyer regarding matter of supposed legacy from her late father. The major deduces that the attackers sought some missing documents, which prompts the duo to search and find a hidden document in Swahili describing a cache of ivory. Next night, the duo are lured separately into the same house and imprisoned in a flooding cellar. They escape and the major reveals that the document was safely sent away. The happy pair gets engaged and moves to Africa. Pyne meets with Mrs Oliver to congratulate her for designing a successful adventure for two of his clients.

=== The Case of the Distressed Lady ===
Mrs Daphne St. John, having lost heavily at a casino, steals a diamond ring from her friend Lady Naomi Dortheimer to cover her debts. After pawning the real ring and replacing it with a paste copy, she later inherits money, retrieves the original, and seeks Parker Pyne’s help to return it discreetly. Pyne arranges for his associates, Claude Luttrell and Madeleine de Sara, to attend a Dortheimer party as dancers and switch the rings. When Mrs St. John returns to Pyne’s office, he denounces the woman as Ernestine Richards, Lady Dortheimer’s secretary, who had attempted to use Pyne to steal the genuine ring by supplying the detective with a copy. Fortunately, Pyne did not fall for her ruse and he declines to charge her, noting that he failed to make her happy.

=== The Case of the Discontented Husband ===
Reginald Wade is a mild-mannered sports enthusiast, while his wife Iris likes art and has become friends with the cultured Sinclair Jordan. Insisting that he changes his ways, the wife poses six-month divorce ultimatum. Parker Pyne advises Wade to make his wife jealous through a staged flirtation. Pyne arranges for his associate, Madeleine de Sara, to visit the Wades for the weekend.

Initially amused, Iris grows resentful as Madeleine openly flatters her husband and provokes tension between the couple. The situation escalates when Jordan also becomes infatuated with Madeleine, leading to further conflict. Following Pyne’s plan, Wade declares his intent to leave with Madeleine and marry her. However, the scheme backfires when Wade returns to Pyne’s office confessing genuine love for Madeleine. Iris soon arrives, resulting in a chaotic confrontation. Pyne admits the failure, observing that the outcome should have been foreseen.

=== The Case of the City Clerk ===
Mr Roberts, a middle-aged clerk with a content but uneventful life, consults Parker Pyne seeking adventure. Though unable to pay much, Roberts is accepted as a client after Pyne warns him of possible danger. Pyne collaborates with government contact, Mr Bonnington, who needs secret plans transported to Geneva following the murder of Professor Petersfield. With no trusted agents available, Pyne selects Roberts for the task.

Roberts is told he carries information about the Romanov crown jewels and travels first-class to Geneva, where a bearded man instructs him to continue to Paris. On the train, Roberts meets a glamorous woman claiming to be pursued by a Russian named Vassilievitch. She entrusts him with the “jewels,” hidden in a stocking. When she disappears overnight, Roberts rescues her from the supposed assailant and escorts her safely to Paris. After evading pursuit, they fly to England and deliver the jewels to “Count Stepanyi”, who reveals the woman as “Grand Duchess Olga”; both are revealed to the reader as Pyne’s associates.

In reality, the mission successfully delivered government papers under the guise of an unrelated adventure. Mr Roberts receives a discreet payment and satisfaction from having experienced genuine excitement.

=== The Case of the Rich Woman ===
Mrs Abner Rymer, a former farmgirl who became wealthy thanks to her late husband’s invention, feels isolated and dissatisfied with her new life. Seeking happiness, she consults Parker Pyne. A week later, Pyne’s associate Madeleine de Sara, posing as a nurse, brings her to “Dr Constantine,” who claims her illness is psychological and gives her a drugged drink. She awakens in a farmhouse, called “Hannah” by the residents, and is told she has lived there for years. Newspapers report that Mrs Rymer has been committed to a nursing home, allegedly suffering delusions of being a servant named Hannah Moorhouse.

Believing she has fallen victim of a soul-transfer process, Mrs Rymer resigns herself to her new identity and gradually finds fulfillment in rural life. She befriends and later becomes engaged to a widowed farmhand, Joe Welsh. When Pyne later reveals the ruse—explaining that “Hannah” never existed and the entire scenario was staged—Mrs Rymer decides to continue living her new, simpler life. She has saved up a modest sum to buy a small farm, directing the remainder of her fortune to charity.

=== Have You Got Everything You Want? ===
On the Orient Express, Elsie Jeffries meets Parker Pyne and seeks his help after discovering a note among her husband’s papers suggesting that “just before Venice would be the best time” to act against her. During the journey, a supposed fire causes commotion, and a Slavic woman is found in Elsie’s compartment. Afterward, Elsie discovers her jewelry missing. The suspect is detained in Venice, but the jewels remain unfound.

In Constantinople, Pyne reunites with Elsie and her husband, Edward Jeffries, and discreetly returns the jewelry to her without explanation. Later, Pyne reveals Edward had taken the real jewels before leaving London, substituting paste copies to stage a theft at a point where recovery was impossible (at the bridge over the sea). Edward admits he needed the money to pay off Mrs Rossiter, a blackmailer who had tricked him into sleeping in the same bed as her in West Indies. Pyne advises him to confess but withhold the truth about the scam, suggesting his wife will be pleased to believe she has reformed him.

=== The Gate of Baghdad ===
While traveling from Damascus to Baghdad across the Syrian Desert, Parker Pyne joins a group of passengers that includes several Royal Air Force officers, Mr Hensley of the Baghdad public works department, Captain Smethurst, General Poli, and others. Before departure, Pyne discusses with Poli the case of a missing crooked financier, Samuel Long, and later encounters a troubled Smethurst, who hints at a moral conflict.

During the journey, the motor coach becomes stuck in desert mud overnight, and Smethurst is found dead in his seat. Evidence, including a sand-filled sock, suggests murder. Although no external injuries are first apparent, Pyne’s investigation reveals a small stab wound near the collar. Piecing together overheard remarks and inconsistencies, Pyne concludes that one of the RAF officers, “Dr Loftus,” is actually Samuel Long in disguise, having killed Smethurst with a medical instrument to prevent exposure.

Long admits buying the identity of a doctor from the real Loftus. Although Smethurst, a former schoolmate, recognised him, he promised to delay reporting him until Baghdad due to their earlier relationship. Immediately after confessing, he collapses and dies—his cigarette laced with prussic acid—thus escaping formal justice.

=== The House at Shiraz ===
While traveling through the Middle East, Parker Pyne flies with a German pilot, Herr Schlagal, who recounts a disturbing story about his former passengers: Lady Esther Carr and her companion, Muriel King. Schlagal confides that he suspects Lady Esther of murdering her companion, claiming he saw signs of madness in her behavior. Pyne, aware of the Carr family’s history of mental illness, takes interest in the case.

In Shiraz, Pyne learns from the local consul that Lady Esther lives reclusively in a nearby house, avoiding all contact with the English community since her companion’s death in a fall from a balcony. Intrigued, Pyne writes to her and is invited to visit. During their conversation, he observes that she longs for England yet reacts strangely to mentions of high society. Clued in by this and earlier comments about the lady’s eyes, Pyne deduces that the woman posing as Lady Esther is actually her companion, Muriel King. The real Lady Esther, driven by insanity and jealousy of the pilot’s attentions, attacked Muriel and fell to her death by accident. Fearing suspicion, Muriel assumed her mistress’s identity and has lived in isolation ever since. Pyne reassures her that he believes her story and offers to help clear her name and reunite her with Herr Schlagal.

=== The Pearl of Price ===
While traveling through Jordan to Petra, Parker Pyne joins a group that includes American millionaire Caleb Blundell, his daughter Carol, secretary Jim Hurst, Sir Donald Marvel, archaeologist Dr Carver, and Colonel Dubosc. During a discussion on honesty and wealth, Blundell boasts of his riches, illustrated by Carol’s valuable pearl earrings. The next day, one earring disappears while the group is atop a plateau. All travelers agree to be searched, but the earring is not found.

Carol privately hires Pyne to recover the pearl and clear Hurst’s name, as he is a reformed thief she is in relationship with. She suspects her disapproving father and claims he arranged to be searched to appear above suspicion. Pyne quickly identifies Dr Carver as the culprit. Confronted, Carver admits to stealing the earring (by concealing it in plasticine) to fund an archaeological expedition. Pyne informs him that his plan was futile—the pearls are imitation, as Blundell’s wealth was lost in the economic slump.

=== Death on the Nile ===
While traveling on a Nile steamer, Parker Pyne shares the voyage with Sir George and Lady Grayle, Lady Grayle’s niece Pamela, her nurse Elsie MacNaughton, and Sir George’s secretary Basil West. Lady Grayle, a wealthy and difficult hypochondriac, married Sir George for companionship in exchange for her fortune. During the trip, she secretly asks Pyne to investigate her suspicion that her husband is poisoning her, claiming her health always declines in his presence and improves during his absences. Her nurse privately confirms the correlation, but is hesitant to accuse Sir George.

One night, Lady Grayle dies showing signs of strychnine poisoning. Evidence found in Sir George’s possession appears to implicate him, but Pyne recalls seeing the victim destroy a letter and suspects a more complicated explanation. Speaking with Pamela, he learns that Lady Grayle had recently grown delusional, believing that Basil West was in love with her. Confronting West, Pyne uncovers the truth: Basil had indeed seduced Lady Grayle, intending to poison her and frame her husband so he could marry Pamela. Pyne tricks him into confessing by pretending that incriminating letters survived. With the case resolved, Pyne departs incognito for Greece.

=== The Oracle at Delphi ===
While staying at a hotel in Delphi, wealthy widow Mrs Peters and her son Willard meet several other guests, including a quiet man named Mr Thompson and a charming stranger who befriends her. Later that day, Mrs Peters discovers a ransom note demanding £10,000 for her son’s return. The friendly man reveals himself as Parker Pyne and advises her to await further instructions. A second note follows, offering to exchange Willard for her valuable diamond necklace.

Pyne arranges for a jeweller from Athens to create a paste replica of the necklace and tells Mrs Peters he will deliver the fake to the kidnappers. The next day, however, Willard is brought back safely by Mr Thompson, who reveals that the supposed Pyne was an impostor and the necklace was the target of the scheme all along. The impostor and his accomplice are arrested, and Mr Thompson is revealed to be the real Parker Pyne, traveling incognito.

== Literary significance and reception ==
The unnamed reviewer in The New York Times Book Review of 1 January 1935 said, "The stories are sufficiently varied, both as to scene and as to plot, to afford this new detective the widest possible scope for his abilities. Parker Pyne can never supplant Hercule Poirot in the hearts of Agatha Christie's admirers, but he is a welcome addition to her gallery of characters."

In The Observer's issue of 18 November 1934, "Torquemada" (Edward Powys Mathers) stated that Christie was, "the only consistently inspired practitioner of an art where ingenuity and industry have so often to substitute for genius." On the subject of this collection, Mr. Mathers said that the book "has a certain appeal to all Agatha Christie fans, and to ourselves and to all lovers of the well-made magazine story."

Robert Barnard: "A mediocre collection. Parker Pyne begins as a consultant Miss Lonelyhearts, ends up as a conventional detective."

== References to other works ==
"The Gate of Baghdad" twice quotes the poem "Gates of Damascus" by James Elroy Flecker. As Pyne stands in Damascus he likens the Baghdad Gate that they will go through as the "Gate of Death" however whereas Flecker's poem talks of four gates in the city, in reality there are eight in the ancient walls and none of them is called the Baghdad gate. Christie also referenced the poem in naming her final written work, Postern of Fate (1973).

== Film, TV or theatrical adaptations ==
Two of the stories in the collection, "The Case of the Middle-Aged Wife" and "The Case of the Discontented Soldier", were adapted by Thames Television in 1982 as part of its series The Agatha Christie Hour, which featured ten one-off plays from short stories by the writer. In these adaptations, Maurice Denham played Pyne and Angela Easterly was seen as Miss Lemon.

== Publication history ==
- 1934, William Collins & Sons (London), November 1934, Hardcover, 256 pp
- 1934, Dodd Mead and Company (New York), 1934, Hardcover, 244 pp
- 1951, Dell Books (New York), Paperback, (Dell number 550 [mapback]), 224 pp
- 1953, Penguin Books, Paperback, (Penguin number 932), 190 pp
- 1962, Fontana Books (Imprint of HarperCollins), Paperback, 158 pp
- 1978, Ulverscroft Large-print Edition, Hardcover, 299 pp, ISBN 0-7089-0141-7

=== First publication of stories ===
Nine of the stories in Parker Pyne Investigates had their true first publication in the US as follows:

- "The Case of the Discontented Soldier", "The Case of the Distressed Lady", "The Case of the City Clerk", "The Case of the Discontented Husband" and "The Case of the Rich Woman" all appeared in the August 1932 issue of Cosmopolitan magazine (issue number 554) under the sub-heading of "Are You Happy? If Not Consult Mr. Parker Pyne" with illustrations by Marshall Frantz.
- "Have You Got Everything You Want?", "'The House at Shiraz", "Death on the Nile" and "The Oracle at Delphi" all appeared in the April 1933 issue of Cosmopolitan magazine (issue number 562) under the sub-heading of Have You Got Everything You Want? If Not, Consult Mr. Parker Pyne again with illustrations by Marshall Frantz. The first story was not individually named.

Known publication of the stories in the UK are as follows:

- "The Case of the Middle-aged Wife": First published in issue 613 of Woman's Pictorial of 8 October 1932 as "The Woman Concerned".
- "The Case of the Discontented Soldier": First published in issue 614 of Woman's Pictorial of 15 October 1932 (illustrated by J.A. May and with an additional title of '"Adventure – By Request")
- "The Case of the Distressed Lady": First published in issue 615 of Woman's Pictorial of 22 October 1932 (illustrated by J.A. May and with an additional title of "Faked!")
- "The Case of the Discontented Husband": First published in issue 616 of Woman's Pictorial of 29 October 1932 (illustrated by J.A. May and with an additional title of "His Lady's Affair")
- "The Case of the City Clerk": First published in issue 503 of the Strand Magazine in November 1932 under the title of "The £10 Adventure".
- "Have You Got Everything You Want?", "The Gate of Baghdad" and "The House at Shiraz" were all first published in issue 481 of Nash's Pall Mall Magazine in June 1933 under the sub-heading of "The Arabian Nights of Parker Pyne". The individual story titles as they appeared in the magazine were "On the Orient Express", "At the Gate of Baghdad" and "In the House at Shiraz" respectively. Marshall Frantz's illustrations from Cosmopolitan were re-used.
- "The Pearl of Price", "Death on the Nile" and "The Oracle at Delphi" were all first published in issue 482 of Nash's Pall Mall Magazine in July 1933 under the sub-heading of "More Arabian Nights of Parker Pyne". "The Pearl of Price" appeared under the slightly abridged title of "The Pearl". Again, Marshall Frantz's illustrations from Cosmopolitan were re-used.

Known publication of the stories in the US are as follows:

- "Death on the Nile": First published in the US in Cosmopolitan, April 1933, and in the UK by the Pall Mall Magazine July 1933; then in 1934 in anthologies Parker Pyne Investigates (UK) and Mr Parker Pyne, Detective (USA).
- "The Case of the Rich Woman": First published in the US in Cosmopolitan, August 1932, then in 1934 in anthologies Parker Pyne Investigates (UK) and Mr Parker Pyne, Detective (US).
