= The Regatta Mystery =

Agatha Christie short story collection

The Regatta Mystery and Other Stories
- Dust-jacket illustration of the first US edition
- Author: Agatha Christie
- Language: English
- Genre: Crime Short Stories
- Publisher: Dodd, Mead and Company
- Publication date: 1939
- Publication place: United Kingdom; United States
- Media type: Print (hardback & paperback)
- Pages: 229 pp (first edition, hardback)
- Preceded by: And Then There Were None
- Followed by: Sad Cypress

The Regatta Mystery and Other Stories is a short story collection written by the English writer Agatha Christie and first published in the US by Dodd, Mead and Company in 1939. The first edition retailed at $2.00.

The stories feature, with one exception ("In a Glass Darkly"), Hercule Poirot, Miss Marple or Parker Pyne, Christie's detectives. The collection was not published in the UK and was the first time a Christie book was published in the US without a comparable publication in the UK; however all of the stories in the collection were published in later UK collections (see UK book appearances of stories below).

== Stories ==
- "The Regatta Mystery"
- "The Mystery of the Baghdad Chest"
- "How Does Your Garden Grow?"
- "Problem at Pollensa Bay"
- "Yellow Iris"
- "Miss Marple Tells a Story"
- "The Dream"
- "In a Glass Darkly"
- "Problem at Sea"

"The Regatta Mystery" has Mr Parker Pyne (or, in the first published edition, Hercule Poirot) catch a diamond thief during regatta festivities at Dartmouth harbour.

"The Mystery of the Bagdad Chest" concerns how a dead body found its way into the titular chest in the midst of a dance party. Arthur Hastings chronicles Hercule Poirot's unravelling of the mystery.

"How Does Your Garden Grow?" is a line from the nursery rhyme "Mary, Mary, Quite Contrary", which Poirot is reminded of when visiting a country house with a beautifully maintained garden whose mistress has just died – after writing a cryptic letter requesting his help.

The "Problem at Pollensa Bay" concerns a mother's dislike for her son's fiancée. The problem is solved by fellow vacationer Parker Pyne.

In "Yellow Iris", Poirot follows an anonymous phone call to a restaurant table laden with the favourite flower of a woman who died mysteriously four years before. This story was expanded into the full-length mystery novel Sparkling Cyanide, with Colonel Race replacing Poirot.

"Miss Marple Tells a Story" is written in the first person by the elderly sleuth, who recalls solving (without leaving her own chair) a seemingly impossible murder.

In "The Dream", an eccentric millionaire tells Poirot of a troubling dream in which he kills himself – and is found dead a week later.

"In a Glass Darkly" is the only story in the collection not to feature one of Christie's detectives (it is told by an anonymous narrator), and the only one to invoke the supernatural. Its title alludes to the phrase "Through a glass darkly", used by the Apostle Paul to describe how we currently view the world.

In "Problem at Sea", a rich woman is found dead in her cabin on a luxury ship off the shore of Alexandria. The story concludes with Poirot saying: "I do not approve of murder."

== Literary reception ==
In The New York Times Book Review for 25 June 1939, Isaac Anderson mentioned by name "Miss Marple Tells a Story" and went on to say that, "Neither this story nor any of the others is comparable to the longer works of Agatha Christie, but that is scarcely to be expected, for the detective story, more perhaps than any other type of fiction, needs continued suspense to hold the reader's interest, and very few authors have been able to manage that within the limits of the short story."

An unnamed reviewer in the Toronto Daily Star (30 June 1939) wrote, regarding the title story "The Regatta Mystery", that "Agatha Christie succeeds in baffling her readers ... [B]ut far from plausible is her solution", and went on generally to say, "The author is handicapped by attempting to compress her plots into 27-odd pages each. Nor has she opportunity for continued suspense."

== Publication history ==
- 1939, Dodd, Mead and Company, Hardback, 229 pp
- 1939, Lawrence E. Spivak (New York), Abridged edition, 126 pp
- 1946, Avon Books, Paperback, (Avon number 85)
- 1964, Dell Books, Paperback, (Dell number 7336), 192 pp

=== First publication of stories in the US ===
- "The Mystery of the Baghdad Chest": January 1932 (Volume LIIX, Number 1) issue of the Ladies Home Journal with an illustration by Robert E. Lee.
- "In a Glass Darkly": 28 July 1934 (Volume 94, Number 4) issue of Collier's Weekly with an illustration by Harry Morse Meyers.
- "How Does Your Garden Grow?": June 1935 (Volume LII, Number 6) issue of the Ladies Home Journal with illustrations by Mead Schaeffer.
- "Problem at Sea": 12 January 1936 issue of the weekly newspaper supplement This Week magazine with an illustration by Stanley Parkhouse.
- "Problem at Pollensa Bay": 5 September 1936 (Volume 13, Number 36) issue of Liberty magazine under the title Siren Business with an illustration by James Montgomery Flagg.
- "Yellow Iris": 10 October 1937 edition of the Hartford courant newspaper under the title "Case of the Yellow Iris" with an uncredited illustration.
- "The Dream": 23 October 1937 (Volume 210, Number 17) issue of The Saturday Evening Post with illustrations by F. R. Gruger.

The original version of "The Regatta Mystery" featured Hercule Poirot. The story was later rewritten by Christie to change the detective from Poirot to Parker Pyne for book publication and all collections in both the US and UK contain the Pyne version of the story. The original Poirot version appeared in the 3 May 1936 edition of the Hartford Courant newspaper with an uncredited illustration. It surfaced again in 2008 as part of the three-volume Harper collection, Agatha Christie: The Complete Short Stories – Masterpieces in Miniature. (The story appears as the postscript to the Poirot volume.)

"Miss Marple Tells a Story" was specially commissioned by the BBC as a radio play and read by Christie herself on 11 May 1934 on BBC's National Programme. No print publications of the story prior to 1939 are known. For first publications in the UK, see the applicable UK collections below.

=== UK book appearances of stories ===
The stories contained in The Regatta Mystery and Other Stories appear in the following UK collections:

- The Adventure of the Christmas Pudding (1960): "The Dream", and an expanded version of "The Mystery of the Baghdad Chest" retitled "The Mystery of the Spanish Chest".
- Poirot's Early Cases (1974): "How Does Your Garden Grow?" and "Problem at Sea".
- Miss Marple's Final Cases and Two Other Stories (1979): "Miss Marple Tells a Story" and "In a Glass Darkly".
- Problem at Pollensa Bay and Other Stories (1991): "The Regatta Mystery", "Problem at Pollensa Bay", and "Yellow Iris". "The Regatta Mystery" and "Problem at Pollensa Bay" had originally appeared in the now out of print collection 13 For Luck! in 1966.
- While the Light Lasts and Other Stories (1997): "The Mystery of the Baghdad Chest". This story was later expanded by Christie, with Arthur Hastings removed from it, as "The Mystery of the Spanish Chest" published in The Adventure of the Christmas Pudding
