= Poirot's Early Cases =

1974 Poirot short story collection by Agatha Christie

- Dust-jacket illustration of the first UK edition
- Author: Agatha Christie
- Cover artist: Margaret Murray
- Language: English
- Genre: Crime novel
- Publisher: Collins Crime Club
- Publication date: September 1974
- Publication place: United Kingdom
- Media type: Print (hardback & paperback)
- Pages: 256 first edition, hardcover
- ISBN: 0-00-231312-X
- OCLC: 1199438
- Dewey Decimal: 823/.9/12
- LC Class: PZ3.C4637 Poj3 PR6005.H66
- Preceded by: Elephants Can Remember
- Followed by: Curtain

Poirot's Early Cases is a short story collection by the English writer Agatha Christie and first published in the UK by Collins Crime Club in September 1974. The book retailed at £2.25. Although the stories contained within the volume had all appeared in previous US collections, the book also appeared there later in 1974 under the slightly different title of Hercule Poirot's Early Cases in an edition retailing at $6.95.

In this collection, Christie charts some of the cases from Hercule Poirot's early career, before he was internationally renowned as a detective. All the stories had first been published in periodicals between 1923 and 1935.

== Plot summaries ==
=== "The Affair at the Victory Ball" ===
Chief Inspector Japp asks Poirot to assist Scotland Yard in the strange events which took place at a recent costumed Victory Ball. A group of six people, headed by the young Viscount Cronshaw, attended all dressed in the costumes of the Commedia dell'arte. Lord Cronshaw was Harlequin, his uncle, the honourable Eustace Beltane, was Pulcinella. In the roles of Pierrot and Pierrette were Mr and Mrs Christopher Davidson and finally, Miss "Coco" Courtenay, an actress rumoured to be engaged to Lord Cronshaw, was Columbine. During the ball, Cronshaw was stabbed through the heart with a table knife. The next morning Coco Courtenay was found dead in her bed from an overdose of cocaine.

Poirot deduces that, since rigor mortis had set in by the time Cronshaw's body was discovered, the person seen in the Harlequin costume not long before the body was found must have been one of the others. Poirot reveals that the strength with which the knife was plunged into Cronshaw meant that a man was responsible for the crime. He identifies the killer as Christopher Davidson, whom Cronshaw was about to expose as Coco's drug supplier. Davidson killed Cronshaw, hid the body behind a curtain, then took Coco home and gave her enough cocaine to kill her. He returned to the ball, stripped off his Pierrot costume to expose a Harlequin one underneath, and impersonated Cronshaw to throw off suspicion.

=== "The Adventure of the Clapham Cook" ===
Poirot receives a visit from a Mrs Todd of Clapham, who insists that he investigate the disappearance of Eliza Dunn, her cook. Two days earlier, Eliza had abruptly left her job without giving notice; she has not communicated with Mrs Todd since then except to send for her trunk that same day. Mr and Mrs Todd have taken in a lodger named Simpson, who works at a bank from which a missing clerk named Davis is suspected of stealing £90,000 in securities.

Poirot has his secretary Miss Lemon place advertisements in the local newspapers and The Times, encouraging Eliza to reply. As soon as possible Poirot and Hastings visit her to investigate her disappearance. She had been visited by a solicitor who told her that she had inherited a cottage in Carlisle and an annual income of £300, contingent on her immediately leaving domestic service. Eliza accepted the offer and left her job that day to take a train north, giving the solicitor a letter of resignation to deliver to Mrs Todd. Her belongings were shipped to her soon afterward, though wrapped in paper parcels instead of packed in her old trunk.

After an interview with Simpson, Poirot determines that he had stolen the securities and murdered Davis, intending to hide his crime. Disguised as the solicitor, Simpson concocted the inheritance as a ruse to get Eliza out of the way and then deliberately failed to deliver her letter to Mrs Todd. He used Eliza's trunk to ship Davis' body out of the area, relying on its inconspicuous appearance to avoid scrutiny. He attempts to flee from England but is soon apprehended trying to board an ocean liner bound for Venezuela, and Davis' body is found in the trunk, in storage at Glasgow Central Station.

=== "The Cornish Mystery" ===
Poirot receives a visit from a Mrs Pengelley, a middle-aged woman who is afraid that she is being poisoned by her husband, a dentist. She has no proof, only that she suffers stomach pains (diagnosed as gastritis by her doctor) after eating whenever both of them are at home, but not when he is away at weekends. In addition, a supposedly unused bottle of weed killer is half empty.

Poirot and Hastings travel to Cornwall the next day and are shocked to find that Mrs Pengelley died half an hour before. Poirot interviews Mrs. Pengelley's niece Freda Stanton, as well as Jacob Radnor, a young man who had been keeping company with Freda. The two are engaged, but Mrs Pengelley developed an infatuation with Radnor, resulting in a row between her and Freda that prompted Freda to move out.

Some time later, Mrs Pengelley's body is exhumed and found to contain high levels of arsenic, and her husband is arrested and charged with her murder. After attending the committal hearing, Poirot meets with Radnor and presents a murder confession for him to sign. Poirot conjectures that Radnor had intended to take control of the family's money by gaining the confidence of both women, marrying Freda, killing Mrs Pengelley, and framing her husband for the crime. He bluffs Radnor into believing that the police have him under surveillance, and promises to wait one day before turning over the confession and letting them track him down. Radnor signs the document and hurries away; Poirot then admits to Hastings that he had no proof of the man's guilt and could only establish it by deception.

=== "The Adventure of Johnnie Waverly" ===
Poirot is called in to investigate the kidnapping of three-year-old Johnnie Waverly, the son of Marcus Waverly, from his home, Waverly Court in Surrey. Prior to the kidnapping, the family received anonymous letters that threatened to take the boy unless twenty-five thousand pounds was paid. The police took little interest until the final letter which stated that the boy would be kidnapped at twelve o'clock the next day. On that day, Mrs Waverly was mildly poisoned and a note was left on Mr Waverly's pillow that stated, "At Twelve O'clock". Horrified that someone inside the house is involved, Mr Waverly sacks all of the staff except Tredwell, his long-time butler, and Miss Collins, his wife's trusted secretary-companion.

Poirot and Hastings travel to Waverly Court, where they learn of the existence of a priest hole near the room in which Johnnie was last seen. After examining its floor and questioning both Tredwell and Miss Collins, Poirot deduces that Mr Waverly arranged the kidnapping with the help of Tredwell and a confederate, intending to get money from his rich but miserly wife. Mr Waverly took advantage of a distraction to hide Johnnie in the priest hole, then brought him out later and drove him off the grounds. He admits to the scheme and reveals that Johnnie is safe at the home of his former nurse, and Poirot promises not to reveal the truth to Mrs Waverly as long as the boy is returned within 24 hours.

=== "The Double Clue" ===
Poirot is called in by Marcus Hardman, a collector of various antique precious objects, to investigate a jewel theft. The theft occurred from his safe when he was holding a small tea party at his house. He showed his guests his collection of medieval jewels and later discovered that the safe had been rifled and the objects taken. Four of his guests had the opportunity to take the items – Mr Johnston, a South African millionaire only just arrived in London; Countess Vera Rossakoff, a refugee from the Russian Revolution; Bernard Parker, a young and effeminate agent for Mr Hardman, and Lady Runcorn, a middle-aged society lady whose aunt is a kleptomaniac.

Poirot examines the scene of the crime and finds a man's glove holding the safe open and a cigarette case with the initials "BP". Parker denies that either item is his, but Poirot matches the glove to one thrown down carelessly in his home. Later, Poirot receives a visit from the Countess Rossakoff, who is indignant that Parker has fallen under suspicion.

The next day, Poirot visits Hardman and reveals the thief as the Countess Rossakoff. He tells Hastings that it was the double clue of the glove and the case which made him suspicious. Only one of the clues was genuine and the other was deliberately planted as a red herring. As the cigarette case was not Parker's, that must have been the genuine clue. The case belonged to the Countess whose initials – VR – are В Р in Cyrillic. The Countess returns the jewels and leaves London, and Poirot does not tell the police of the theft.

=== "The King of Clubs" ===
Poirot receives a visit from Prince Paul of Maurania, who wants to marry the actress Valerie Saintclair, currently under suspicion for the murder of Henry Reedburn, a theatrical impresario. Reedburn was in love with Valerie although his feelings were not reciprocated. Prince Paul and Valerie saw a clairvoyant the previous week, who turned over the king of clubs in her pack of cards and said a man threatened danger to her. The prince is afraid that Valerie interpreted this to mean Reedburn and attacked him.

Poirot and Hastings visit the scene of the crime and the neighbouring Oglander home. Valerie tells them that Reedburn held a secret of hers and threatened her but she did not kill him. She went to his house by prior appointment, and was pleading with him when a man dressed like a tramp attacked him from behind the curtained recess. She fled from the house towards the Oglander home, interrupting the family game of bridge, and has been recuperating there ever since.

Returning to the drawing room, Poirot notices that the king of clubs is missing from the cards on the bridge table. After further investigation, he returns to the Oglander house to assure Mrs Oglander that the police will not find out what happened. He deduces that the four family members (parents, son, daughter) set up the bridge game to provide an alibi for themselves, but left one card in the box by mistake. A male family member had gone with Valerie during her visit to Reedburn, accidentally killed him and moved the body, then carried Valerie back home after she fainted; Poirot determines that the son is the more likely culprit due to the physical strength required for these acts.

Poirot explains to Hastings that Valerie is the Oglanders' estranged daughter, having noted similarities between her appearance and theirs. Despite the breach in the relationship, she turned to them in her moment of need. Her story of the tramp will stand and she is free to marry Prince Paul.

=== "The Lemesurier Inheritance" ===
Poirot and Hastings meet Captain Vincent Lemesurier and his uncle Hugo, a chemist. Cousin Roger tells them about a curse that has plagued the family since the Middle Ages, in which no firstborn son has lived to inherit the family estate. Poirot and Hastings learn the next day that Vincent has committed suicide by jumping from his train during the journey home. Over the next few years, all other potential heirs die under various circumstances, leaving Hugo to inherit the estate.

Poirot receives a visit from Hugo's young wife, an American who does not believe in the curse. She worries about her eight-year-old son, Ronald, who has had three narrow escapes from death in the past few months. Poirot and Hastings travel to the home in Northumberland and renew their acquaintance with Hugo, who believes that Ronald is doomed and that the couple's younger son Gerald will inherit. Poirot takes note of one of Ronald's mishaps, in which he fell while climbing down an ivy vine that had been deliberately severed.

A report comes in of Ronald being stung by a bee, drawing Poirot's concern. He and Hastings keep vigil in Ronald's room that night; when a figure creeps in and tries to poison Ronald with an injection, the two men overpower him and discover him to be Hugo. He had engineered the deaths of the other family members in order to inherit the estate and, having gone mad, was trying to maintain the legend of the curse by killing Ronald; the "sting" was actually a sedative. He is placed in an asylum, and Ronald inherits the estate upon his death. However, Poirot muses that Ronald may not be Hugo's biological son, noting that his hair colour matches that of Hugo's secretary, and that the curse may yet live on.

=== "The Lost Mine" ===
Poirot investigates the murder of Wu Ling, an agent for Burma Mines Ltd. The mine's location was lost; the only clue to its location is in old papers. Wu Ling agreed to negotiate a sale of the papers and travelled to England to complete the transaction. Mr Pearson was to meet Wu Ling at the train in Southampton but Wu failed to appear. The police were contacted and the next evening Wu Ling's body was found floating in the Thames.

Poirot interviews a young bank clerk called Charles Lester, who called for Wu Ling at his hotel on the morning of the disappearance. Mr Lester told a story of having been met by Wu's servant, who took them in a taxi to Limehouse where Lester became nervous and got out of the taxi before they reached their destination. Lester's story is revealed as a lie and he is arrested, but the papers about the mine are not found.

Poirot finds the papers – Pearson has them. He had met Wu Ling in Southampton and taken him directly to Limehouse, where Wu Ling was killed. Hearing of Lester's invitation to visit the hotel from Wu Ling himself, Pearson set the young man up to take the blame for the murder. Pearson is arrested and Poirot becomes a shareholder in a Burmese mine.

=== "The Plymouth Express" ===
A young naval officer on the Plymouth express finds the dead body of a woman underneath a seat in his carriage. The woman is identified as the Honourable Mrs Rupert Carrington, née Flossie Halliday, the daughter of Gordon Halliday, an American mining magnate who asks Poirot to take on the case.

Poirot and Hastings call on Mr Halliday in Park Lane. Last seen, his daughter was going to a house party in the West Country, carrying her jewels. She travelled by train from Paddington and changed at Bristol for the train to Plymouth. Her maid, Jane Mason, travelled on the same trains in a third-class carriage.

Poirot guesses that the knife used to kill Mrs Carrington has been found by the side of the line and that a paper boy who spoke to Mrs Carrington has been interviewed. Japp confirms that this is exactly what has happened. Japp tells Poirot that one of the jewels has been pawned by a known thief called Red Narky, who usually works with a woman called Gracie Kidd.

Poirot and Hastings return to Halliday's house, where Poirot finds clothes like the ones worn by Mrs Carrington when she was murdered. It is revealed that Mason is Gracie Kidd. She and Red Narky probably murdered Mrs Carrington before Bristol. Gracie rode the train past Bristol dressed in similar clothing to the now-dead woman and bought two items from a newsboy, drawing attention to herself in many ways.

=== "The Chocolate Box" ===
Poirot relates the one occasion when he failed to solve a crime through an error in his own reasoning, years earlier when he was a police detective in Brussels.

Paul Déroulard, a French Deputy who was living in Brussels, had died from heart failure. Mademoiselle Virginie Mesnard, a cousin of his late wife, asks Poirot to investigate.

In the study where the death occurred, Poirot spots an open but full and untouched box of chocolates. Paul ate some chocolates every night after dinner, finishing a box on the night of his death. Poirot requests that a servant bring the empty box and notices that the two lids, one green and one pink, have been switched.

Poirot learns that John Wilson, a friend of Paul who had visited him that night, had recently had a prescription filled for tablets of trinitrin (nitroglycerin) in chocolate. Although Wilson had the means to kill Paul by stuffing these tablets into his chocolates, Poirot cannot discern a motive. He discovers that Wilson had needed the tablets because the ones he had brought from home had gone missing, and later finds an empty bottle at the home of M. de Saint Alard, a visitor with whom Paul had had a heated argument.

Poirot concludes that M. de Saint Alard used Wilson's tablets to poison Paul; when he reports to Paul's mother, though, she confesses to the crime herself. She had seen her son push his wife down the stairs to her death years earlier, but knew that her poor eyesight would make her an unreliable witness at trial. To avenge the death, she stole the tablets, poisoned the last chocolate in Paul's box, and slipped the bottle into M. de Saint Alard's pocket as he left, expecting that his valet would find it and throw it out. However, she first opened the full box by mistake, then switched the lids because she could not see the different colors. Poirot closes his investigation, and Madame Déroulard dies a week later of her infirmities.

=== "The Submarine Plans" ===
Poirot is summoned to the home of Lord Alloway, head of the Ministry of Defence and a potential future Prime Minister. Arriving with Hastings, he is introduced by their host to his guest Admiral Sir Harry Weardale, the First Sea Lord, together with his wife and son, Leonard. The secret plans for the new 'Z'-type of submarine were stolen in the house some three hours earlier.

The prime suspect is a Mrs Conroy, whose past life is something of a mystery, and who moves in diplomatic circles. Questioning Conroy's maid, Poirot correctly guesses that she screamed when Leonard Weardale sneaked an unexpected kiss from her. Lady Weardale asks Poirot if the matter could be dropped if the plans were returned. He agrees that that could be arranged and she promises that they will be within ten minutes.

Poirot points out that the plans must have been taken by Lord Alloway himself. He theorises that Alloway was being blackmailed, in all probability by Mrs Conroy, a foreign agent. He handed over fake copies of the plans with suitable adjustments to make them useless, and then pretend they had been stolen. On the day when Lord Alloway becomes Prime Minister, Poirot receives a cheque and a signed photograph dedicated to "my discreet friend". He also hears that a foreign power attempted to build their own version of the submarine which ended up a failure.

=== "The Third Floor Flat" ===
Four young people, two women and two men, are returning after a night out to the home of one of the women – Patricia Garnett. When Ms. Garnett discovers she has lost her key, the two men, Donovan Bailey and Jimmy Faulkener, make their way up through the coal lift and let the women in. They miscount the floors and end up in the flat one floor below, where they discover its occupant, Mrs. Ernestine Grant, dead. Poirot, who also lives in the building, offers to help.

The police arrive and tell them that Mrs Grant was shot with an automatic pistol some five hours earlier in the kitchen. They have found a note from someone signed "J.F.", the pistol with which she was shot, and a silk handkerchief used to wipe the prints from the gun.

The police leave, but the Inspector gives Poirot permission to inspect the flat. He goes down there with Donovan and Jimmy. Poirot uses ethyl chloride to knock Donovan briefly unconscious. He searches Donovan's pockets to find the missing flat key, which Donovan had abstracted earlier in the evening, and a letter sent to Mrs Grant which arrived by the late evening post. The letter is from a firm of solicitors agreeing that the marriage between Donovan Bailey and Ernestine Grant some eight years before in Switzerland was entirely lawful. Donovan wanted to marry Pat but his previous marriage was stopping him. By chance his first wife moved into the same block as his proposed future wife and was threatening to tell Patricia about their marriage. To stop her, Donovan killed her earlier in the evening but had to return for the solicitor's letter.

=== "Double Sin" ===
On holiday on the north Devon coast, Poirot and Hastings find themselves sat on the bus with a young girl who introduces herself as Mary Durrant. She is travelling to Charlock Bay on behalf of her aunt to take a valuable set of miniatures to an American collector there by the name of J. Baker Wood.

When the bus arrives in Charlock Bay, Miss Durrant tells them that her suitcase has been unlocked somehow and the items stolen. Poirot telephones Mr Wood, who tells him that he had already bought the miniatures. Poirot and Hastings go to visit Mr Wood, Poirot voicing his puzzlement over why the thief took the time to force the lock of the case while leaving it in the suitcase instead of taking the inner case away with them and opening it at their leisure.

Poirot deduces that the theft was staged by Miss Durrant and her aunt. Mr Wood would have had to return the miniatures as they were officially stolen goods and the two women would have had his five hundred pounds and still possessed the miniatures to sell on again.

=== "The Market Basing Mystery" ===
In the small countryside town of Market Basing, the local constable requests Inspector Japp's help. Walter Protheroe, the reclusive owner of a local large mansion, was found dead in his dilapidated house, supposedly by suicide. Japp, Poirot, and Hastings go to Leigh House as requested. It is revealed that Protheroe was shot through the head and his pistol clasped in his right hand. The problem was that the bullet entered behind the left ear and such a shot was impossible. Poirot takes note of a handkerchief hidden in Protheroe's right sleeve, and also of how fresh the room air is despite the closed window and the multiple cigarette stubs in the ashtray and fireplace grate.

A couple named Parker were staying in the house. At the inquest a tramp comes forward to say that he heard Protheroe and Parker argue about money at midnight on the night of the death, implying that the window had been open. Protheroe's true surname is revealed as Wendover; he had been involved with the treacherous sinking of a naval vessel some years earlier and Parker was blackmailing him over the incident. On the suspicion of killing Wendover and making it look like suicide, Parker is arrested.

Poirot summons Miss Clegg to the inn. He surmises that Wendover did in fact kill himself, holding the gun in his left hand. Clegg alone knew that he was left-handed, a fact that Poirot deduced from the handkerchief in the right sleeve. She found his body on the morning after his argument with Parker and decided to frame the latter as a murderer, moving the gun to Wendover's right hand, closing the window, and locking the door.

=== "Wasps' Nest" ===
Poirot visits his friend John Harrison and tells him that he is in the locality to investigate a murder which has not yet been committed. He then turns the conversation round to a wasps' nest on a tree that he sees nearby. A friend of Harrison, Claude Langton, plans to destroy the nest by using petrol injected by a garden syringe. Poirot asks, "Do you like Langton?" and they talk of Harrison's engagement to a girl called Molly Deane who was previously engaged to Langton.

Poirot returns that evening to find Langton leaving and the nest still intact. Poirot tells Harrison that he traded the cyanide Harrison had in his pocket for some washing soda when he visited earlier on. Poirot witnessed the early signs of Langton's romance with Molly Deane being rekindled and Harrison leaving a Harley Street consultant having obviously been given bad news. Harrison confirms that he has two months to live. Poirot surmised that Harrison was planning to commit suicide and make it appear that Langton had killed him, ensuring that his rival would be hanged for murder. Having realised and repented of what he would have done, Harrison expresses his gratitude for Poirot having visited and spoiled his plans.

=== "The Veiled Lady" ===
A heavily veiled lady arrives in Poirot's office and identifies herself as Lady Millicent Castle Vaughan, whose engagement to the Duke of Southshire was recently announced. At age sixteen she wrote an indiscreet letter to a soldier. The letter is now in the possession of Mr Lavington, who demands twenty thousand pounds for its return. At Lavington's house, he showed her the letter in a Chinese puzzle box which he says he keeps in a place she will never find.

In disguise, Poirot goes to Lavington's house the next day and finds the box hidden in a hollowed log, at the bottom of a small wood pile in the kitchen.

The next day, Lady Millicent calls for the letter. She also insists on the puzzle box as a souvenir, but Poirot prevents her taking it. Then, he reveals a hidden compartment in the box holding the six missing jewels from a recent robbery. Japp identifies the lady as "Gertie", an accomplice of Lavington, who was killed in Holland a few days before for his double-cross of his gang over the jewels.

=== "Problem at Sea" ===
On a sea voyage to Egypt, Poirot converses with his fellow passengers. Two of them are a married couple, John and Adeline Clapperton; another, General Forbes, is angrily dismissive of John's military experience. According to him, John had previously been a music hall performer before entering the service, and had been sent to a hospital run by Adeline after suffering a minor injury. Adeline used her society connections to get John a job at the War Office, and the two later married. Poirot notes that John uncomplainingly puts up with Adeline's demands for attention.

The boat reaches Alexandria and many of the company go ashore. Adeline refuses, shouting to John from behind her locked cabin door that she has suffered a bad night and wants to be left alone. When everyone has returned later on, Adeline is no longer answering her door. A steward unlocks it and they find her fatally stabbed through the heart, her money and jewellery stolen.

That evening, at Poirot's request, the other passengers are assembled in the lounge. Poirot addresses them and unwraps a ventriloquist's doll which speaks and repeats the words used by Adeline from behind the locked cabin door to her husband. John leaps from his seat and promptly collapses, dead of a heart attack brought on by shock.

Poirot explains that he had previously seen John performing card tricks, reflected on Forbes' comments about his music hall experience, and conjectured that he might have been a ventriloquist as well as a magician. John had killed his wife, locked the cabin, and thrown his voice to make it seem that she was speaking from inside. A female crew member with a voice similar to Adeline's had assisted Poirot in his demonstration, hidden behind the stage and speaking the lines he gave her. Poirot had guessed that John had a heart condition after finding a prescription for digitalin in Adeline's bag and observing that he exhibited dilated pupils as a side effect of its use, but she did not.

=== "How Does Your Garden Grow?" ===
Poirot receives a letter for assistance from an elderly woman, Miss Amelia Barrowby, who dies five days later. Poirot goes to the house and admires the well-maintained garden, with its spring flowers and edging of shells. He meets a young Russian girl called Katrina Reiger, who speaks cryptically of the money that by rights is hers. She is interrupted by the dead woman's niece, Mrs Delafontaine, and her husband.

Poirot interviews the local police inspector who tells him that they now know that Miss Barrowby died from a dose of strychnine but the problem is that the victim and her two family members all ate the same meal.

The next day brings the news that most of the estate has been left to Katrina, thereby providing a motive, and she is detained by the police.

Poirot calls at Rosebank and sees Mrs Delafontaine. At the front door, he points to the unfinished row of shells and points out they are oyster shells. The Delafontaines fed Miss Barrowby poisoned oysters and planted the shells in the garden to hide from Katrina and the maid. Mrs Delafontaine confesses that she and her husband had been pilfering money from her aunt for many years and could not let the estate go to Katrina.

== Literary significance and reception ==
Maurice Richardson in The Observer (22 September 1974) described Hastings as, "so dumb at times he makes Watson look like Leibnitz", and concluded, "Many date from an early period before she found herself as a Mystifier, but all communicate that unique Christie euphoria."

Robert Barnard: "A late collection of early stories (most from the 'twenties), which had been published in the States but not in Britain. This may suggest discarded chips from the workshop, but in fact the standard here is distinctly higher than the stories in Poirot Investigates, which were the ones Christie did publish at the time."

== Film, television or theatrical adaptations ==
=== Early television play ===
Wasp's Nest was the first Agatha Christie story to be adapted for television; a live transmission took place on 18 June 1937. Christie adapted it for the screen, and transmission was restricted to a small area in and around London.

=== British television series ===
All the stories in the collection have been adapted for episodes in the ITV series Agatha Christie's Poirot with David Suchet in the role of Poirot, Hugh Fraser as Hastings, Philip Jackson as Japp and Pauline Moran as Miss Lemon. Fifteen stories were directly adapted, while one story was merged into another episode, and two stories were reworked by the author, with new titles, which were then adapted for television in the series.

Fifteen adaptations (in order of transmission) were:

Series One

- The Adventure of the Clapham Cook: 8 January 1989

Chief Inspector Japp and Miss Lemon are put into the story although they do not appear in the short story.

- The Adventure of Johnnie Waverly: 22 January 1989

The adaptation has a few changes. Miss Lemon is put into the story though she does not appear in the short story. Inspector McNeil is replaced with recurring character Chief Inspector Japp. Mr Waverly asks Poirot for help, not his wife. When Poirot solves the case, Mr Waverly tells him that Johnnie is with Jessie Withers, Tredwell's niece, not his old nurse. Mr Waverly, Poirot and Hastings go to Jessie's house.

- The Third Floor Flat: 5 February 1989

The adaptation is faithful to the original short story, except for the addition of Captain Hastings and Miss Lemon and replacing Inspector Rice with Chief Inspector Japp. Donovan Bailey tries to escape during Poirot's denouement and crashes Hastings's car during the attempted runaway when Hastings jumps in front of the car.

- Problem at Sea: 19 February 1989

The adaptation is faithful to the original story except for adding Captain Hastings to the story and replacing the stewardess in Poirot's denouement with the little girl Ismene.

- The King of Clubs: 5 March 1989

The adaptation adds Chief Inspector Japp to the story. Poirot and Hastings are on the movie set and there Prince Paul asks Poirot for help, unlike in the short story where he asks the question in Poirot's flat. Valerie Saint Clair is an actress, unlike in the short story, where she is a dancer, and she and Prince Paul are engaged at the outset. There is no mention of a visit to a clairvoyant.

Series Two

- The Veiled Lady: 14 January 1990

The adaptation adds Miss Lemon to the story. Poirot is arrested as an attempted burglar and Hastings manages to escape; later he informs Japp about the incident, who afterwards lets Poirot go. Gertie has an accomplice who pretended to be Lavington and Lavington's real name is Lavington indeed, not Reed as it was in the short story.

- The Lost Mine: 21 January 1990

The adaptation adds Miss Lemon to the story and replaces Inspector Miller with Chief Inspector Japp. Charles Lester has a wife who visits Poirot, unlike in the short story where the fact about his status is left unknown. Pearson's plan is little changed from the story. In the adaptation he never saw Wu Ling, but in the story he saw him, but acted as if he didn't. Also, Poirot calls Pearson into the den, unlike in the short story where it was Pearson who called Poirot.

- The Cornish Mystery: 28 January 1990

Chief Inspector Japp and Miss Lemon are put into the story. Mrs. Pengelley wants Poirot to help her but is afraid to go to his flat. In the adaptation, Hastings uses the two men on the street to look like they are police officers in disguise to scare Radnor, unlike in the short story where it is Poirot who does so. This story is set in July 1935, as seen in the victim's casket.

- Double Sin: 11 February 1990

Chief Inspector Japp and Miss Lemon are put into the story. Joseph Aarons does not appear in the adaptation as Poirot and Hastings go to Windermere on a holiday after Poirot announces that he is going to retire (all to hide the fact that he is actually going there to hear Japp's presentation about the crime cases). Norton Kane becomes a famous writer.

Series Three

- How Does Your Garden Grow?: 6 January 1991

The adaptation has a few changes. Captain Hastings is put into the story. Inspector Simms has been replaced by Chief Inspector Japp. Poirot meets Miss Barrowby at an event about the new rose. In the original short story, he got Miss Barrowby's letter long after her death and then went to her house to investigate.

- The Affair at the Victory Ball: 20 January 1991

Miss Lemon is put into the story. Poirot is at the Victory Ball with Hastings and Japp, unlike in the original short story, where he heard about the case from Chief Inspector Japp, as he wasn't at the Victory Ball himself.

- Wasp's Nest: 27 January 1991

Captain Hastings, Chief Inspector Japp and Miss Lemon are put into the story. The basic premise of the story is left unchanged but the original story comprised mainly a bare-bones narrative by Poirot and included him recalling events from some time ago. This would have been almost impossible to dramatize as is. In the episode, events are presented sequentially with many added plot elements and scenes.

- The Double Clue: 10 February 1991

Chief Inspector Japp and Miss Lemon are put into the story. Countess Rossakoff does not go to Poirot's flat; instead, Poirot is with her all the time, and Hastings and Miss Lemon investigate the case by themselves. Poirot employs a private detective to act like a tramp near Hardman's house to throw Hastings and Miss Lemon after the wrong clue. During Poirot's denouement, Japp finds the missing jewels. Afterwards, Poirot is at the train station, where he sees the countess off.

- The Plymouth Express: 3 March 1991

Miss Lemon is put into the story. Gracie Kidd wasn't in the train at the time the murder happened. Red Narky's name is changed to the surname MacKenzie.

Series Five

- The Chocolate Box: 21 February 1993 (Note: Some scenes were filmed in Brussels, Belgium.)

There are small differences in the television adaptation of The Chocolate Box from the short story. Captain Hastings is not involved. Poirot and Chief Inspector Japp visit Belgium for Japp to receive the prestigious Branche d'Or (Golden Branch) Award. The case is told in flashback and Poirot admits his error in a circular fashion. The chemist is Belgian, Jean-Louis Ferraud. Virginie Mesnard marries him and has two sons. During the investigation, Poirot and Virginie became close. At the end of the episode, Poirot and Virginie meet again and he tells her that Jean-Louis is most fortunate. The flashback year is changed from 1893 to 1914.

Two of the stories in this collection were reworked by Agatha Christie with new titles, and adapted for television under the new titles, both in series one of Agatha Christie's Poirot. Submarine Plans was extended into The Incredible Theft, which aired 26 February 1989 as the eighth episode of series one. The Market Basing Mystery was reworked as Murder in the Mews, which first aired 15 January 1989 as the second episode in series one. Elements of the remaining story, The Lemesurier Inheritance, were worked into the plot of The Labours of Hercules, which first aired 6 November 2013 in the UK.

=== French television series ===
The story The Adventure of Johnnie Waverly was adapted as the twelfth episode of season 2 of the French television series Les Petits Meurtres d'Agatha Christie, airing in 2016.

=== Japanese animated television series ===
Two of the stories (Plymouth Express and The Adventure of the Clapham Cook) were adapted as 2005 episodes of the Japanese animated television series Agatha Christie's Great Detectives Poirot and Marple.

== Publication history ==
- 1974, Collins Crime Club (London), September 1974, Hardcover, 256 pp; ISBN 0-00-231312-X
- 1974, Dodd Mead and Company (New York), 1974, Hardcover, 250 pp; ISBN 0-396-07021-3
- 1975, G.K. Hall & Company Large-print edition, Hardcover, 491 pp; ISBN 0-8161-6265-4
- 1978, Fontana Books (Imprint of HarperCollins), Paperback, 224 pp; ISBN 0-00-615676-2
- 1990, Ulverscroft large-print edition, Hardback; ISBN 0-7089-2326-7

=== First publication of stories ===
All but five of the stories were first published in the UK, unillustrated, in The Sketch magazine. Christie wrote them following a suggestion from its editor, Bruce Ingram, who had been impressed with the character of Poirot in The Mysterious Affair at Styles. The stories first appeared in The Sketch as follows:

- The Affair at the Victory Ball: 7 March 1923 – Issue 1571 (This was Christie's third published short story).
- The King of Clubs: 21 March 1923 – Issue 1573 (under the title The Adventure of the King of Clubs).
- The Plymouth Express: 4 April 1923 – Issue 1575 (under the title The Mystery of the Plymouth Express). The plot was later reworked as the novel The Mystery of the Blue Train (1928).
- The Chocolate Box: 23 May 1923 – Issue 1582 (under the title The Clue of the Chocolate Box).
- The Veiled Lady: 3 October 1923 – Issue 1601 (under the title The Case of the Veiled Lady).
- The Adventure of Johnnie Waverly: 10 October 1923 – Issue 1602 (under the title The Kidnapping of Johnny Waverly).
- The Market Basing Mystery: 17 October 1923 – Issue 1603. Later rewritten and expanded under the title Murder in the Mews, published December 1936 in Woman's Journal.
- The Submarine Plans: 7 November 1923 – Issue 1606. The plot was later reworked as the novella The Incredible Theft, published in the 1937 collection, Murder in the Mews.
- The Adventure of the Clapham Cook: 14 November 1923 – Issue 1607.
- The Lost Mine: 21 November 1923 – Issue 1608.
- The Cornish Mystery: 28 November 1923 – Issue 1609.
- The Double Clue: 5 December 1923 – Issue 1610.
- The Lemesurier Inheritance: 18 December 1923 – Issue 1612.

The remaining stories were published as follows:

- Double Sin: First published in the 23 September 1928 edition of the Sunday Dispatch.
- Wasp's Nest: First published in the 20 November 1928 edition of the Daily Mail.
- The Third Floor Flat: First published in the January 1929 issue of Hutchinson's Adventure & Mystery Story Magazine.
- How Does Your Garden Grow?: First published in issue 536 of The Strand magazine in August 1935. The story was illustrated by R. M. Chandler.
- Problem at Sea: First published in issue 542 of The Strand magazine in February 1936 (under the title of Poirot and the Crime in Cabin 66).

The Market Basing Mystery had previously appeared in book form in the UK in the 1966 collection Thirteen for Luck!, which otherwise reprinted stories which had previously appeared in book collections.

=== US book appearances of stories ===
Although Poirot's Early Cases was published in the US, all of the stories had previously appeared in the following US collections:

- Poirot Investigates (1924) – The Chocolate Box, The Veiled Lady, The Lost Mine.
- The Regatta Mystery and Other Stories (1939) – Problem at Sea, How Does Your Garden Grow?
- Three Blind Mice and Other Stories (1950) – The Adventure of Johnnie Waverly, The Third Floor Flat.
- The Under Dog and Other Stories (1951) – The Affair at the Victory Ball, The King of Clubs, The Plymouth Express, The Market Basing Mystery, The Submarine Plans, The Adventure of the Clapham Cook, The Cornish Mystery, The Lemesurier Inheritance.
- Double Sin and Other Stories (1961) – The Double Clue, Double Sin, Wasp's Nest.
