= Robin Halliday Macartney =

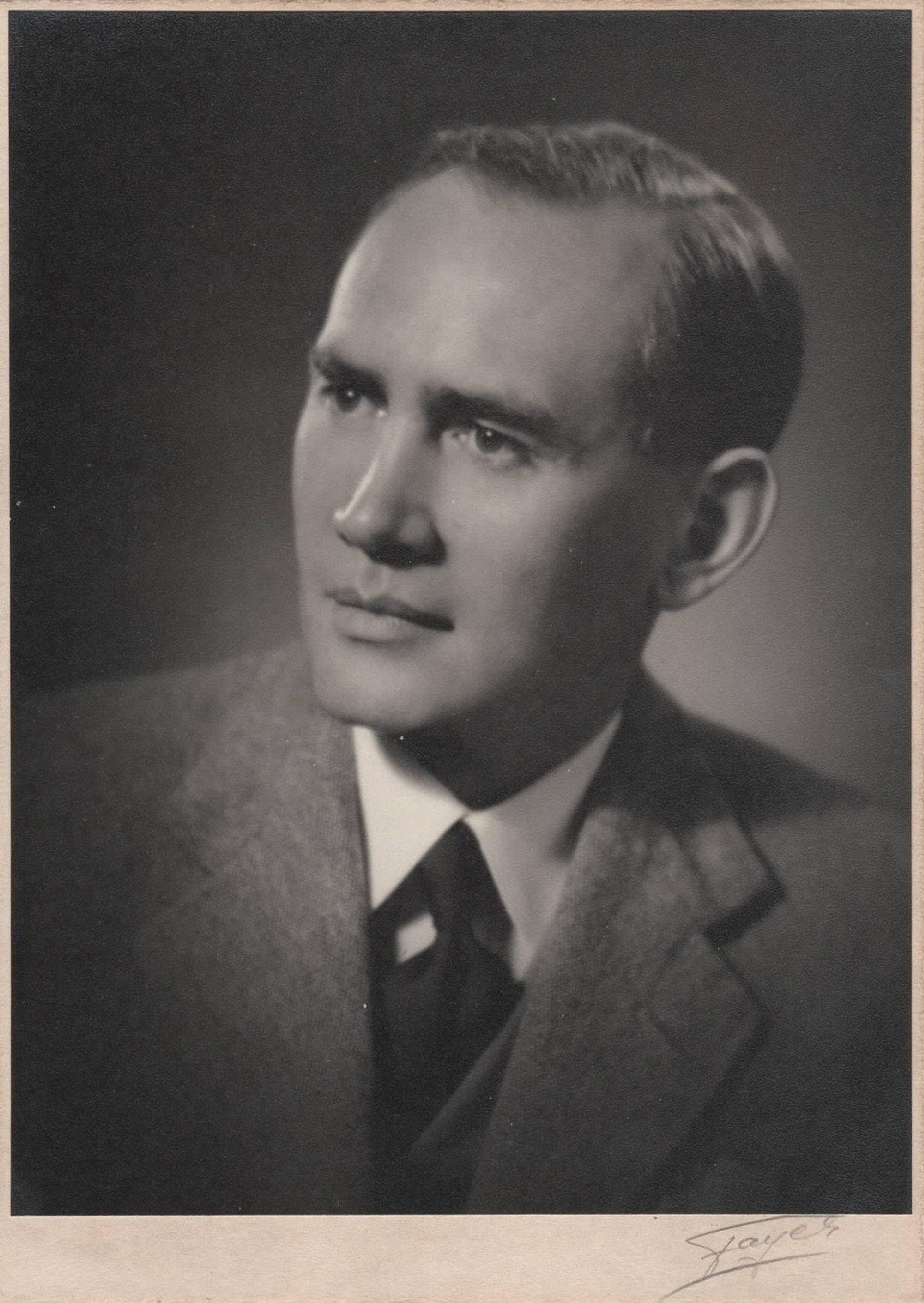
- R. H. Macartney, 1954
- Born: 22 May 1911; Kashgar, China
- Died: 4 October 1973 (aged 62); Midhurst, England
- Occupation: Architect
- Years active: c. 1933-1961
- Spouse(s): Fenella Frances Dora Boyle, m. 1954
- Parents: Sir George Macartney (father); Catherine Macartney (mother)

Robin Halliday Macartney FRIBA (22 May 1911 – 4 October 1973) was a British architect, painter and illustrator. Today he is mainly remembered as the designer of four book covers for Agatha Christie, who immortalized him as "Mac" in her archaeological memoir Come, Tell Me How You Live. Macartney began his working life as excavation architect in the Near East and then entered the service of the Public Works Department. He was active in Cyprus, Sierra Leone and Nyasaland before retiring to Portugal. Two of his buildings have since become presidential residences.

== Early life and training ==
Macartney was born in Kashgar, China, to Sir George Macartney and Catherine Macartney, née Borland. He was the grandson of Halliday Macartney and younger brother of Eric Borland Macartney (1903-1994), a banker who served as Flight Lieutenant with the RAF in Iraq, Persia and Italy during the war, and of Sylvia Theodora Macartney (1906-1950), who studied singing at the Royal Academy of Music.

In Kashgar, the family lived at Chini Bagh, the British consulate, where Sir George acted as consul-general. In 1915 Lady Macartney and the children returned to Britain. After Sir George's retirement in 1918, the family settled on the Isle of Jersey where they lived at Les Vaux, St. Saviour's and later at 4 Overseas Flats, Dicq Road, St Saviour. From 1922, Robin attended Victoria College in St Helier.

In 1929 Macartney moved to 13 Upper Hornsey Rise (renamed Hillrise Road in 1936) in London, where in October he enrolled for a five-year full-time course at the Architectural Association in Bedford Square. In July 1934 he graduated with an honours diploma and was awarded a draughtsmanship prize. In the same year, he was among the candidates that were admitted by the Faculty of Architecture of the British School at Rome to the competition for the Rome scholarship in architecture, the prestigious Rome Prize, which was awarded to F. A. C. Maunder (1908-1972). Macartney gained practical experience as assistant to Messrs. Wimperis, Simpson and Guthrie from June to September 1933 and later in the winter of 1936–37 to Messrs. E. W. Armstrong and O. A. Bayne, followed by three months with R. C. D. Boger. He was elected an Associate of the Royal Institute of British Architects in 1936, his proposers being E. W. Armstrong, John Grey and Howard Robertson, and a Fellow in 1945.

== Archaeological architect ==
R. H. Macartney had a lifelong interest in archaeology. His parents had entertained collectors, travellers and explorers as guests in Kashgar and helped them to obtain Chinese antiques. He had grown up with his father's own collection and later inherited a part which is now in the British Museum. Therefore, he seized the opportunity when in 1934 Max Mallowan was looking for an architect to accompany him and his wife Agatha Christie to Syria. Mallowan used to choose his architects from the fresh graduates of the Architectural Association, and his decision was backed by the recommendation of Sir Aurel Stein, a close friend of Macartney's father. Mallowan was happy with his choice: Macartney, he says, was "a man endowed with a cast-iron stomach and few words, assets that I have always regarded as indispensable on a survey." For the next four years, Macartney moved from dig to dig in the Near East, assisting with the excavations and drawing finds, maps, plans and sections.

During the Habur Survey in November and December 1934 in Syria, the Mallowans and Macartney examined sixty-two tells to decide where to dig. The final choice fell on Chagar Bazar and Tell Brak which Mallowan excavated from 1935 to 1938. Macartney was with him during the first and third season and also for the last few weeks of the second season in 1936.

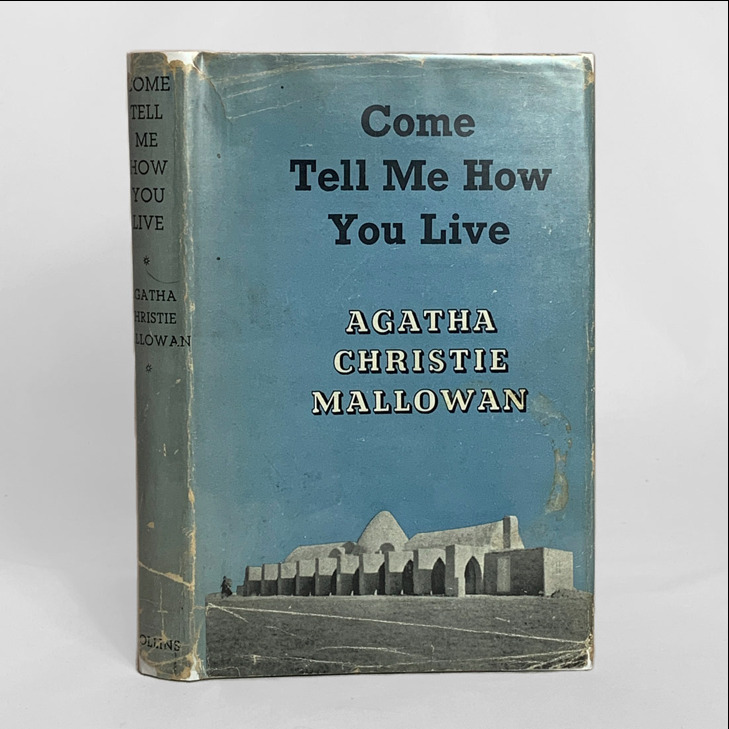
Agatha Christie, Come Tell Me How You Live, first edition, 1946

In Chagar Bazar, Macartney got his first chance to put his architectural skills to use. He had already built a mud-brick lavatory for Agatha Christie in the courtyard of the rented house in Amuda which served as dig house for much of the first season. Now he designed an expedition house together with the Mallowans, who were very pleased with the result. It consisted of a series of five rooms with a large domed central room which served as living- and working-room. Although symmetrical in layout, the outside was asymmetrical: stepped buttresses on the right, a row of pointed arches on the left. Originally, this row was meant to be part of a cloister, adding to the ecclesiastical appearance of the building, but the other three sides were never built. This house, situated to the south-east of the mound, was erected in 1935 within two weeks and survived for about twenty years before "dying a natural death". Today a brick house occupies the site. The expedition house already displayed several characteristics of Macartney's later work: it had two wings and buttresses, it was inspired by vernacular architecture – here: the beehive houses of Syria –, it was designed based on the needs of the residents, it took climate into consideration and it blended harmoniously into its surroundings. Agatha Christie loved the light and airy house and put it on the cover of her archaeological memoir Come, Tell Me How You Live.

Macartney not only assisted Max Mallowan, but also took part in three other excavations. Immediately after the Habur Survey he was in Palestine at Shivta and also possibly early in 1936 at Auja-el-Hafir, the ancient town of Nessana, with the Colt Expedition under the direction of Harris Dunscombe Colt (1901-1973). Unfortunately, nearly all excavation records were destroyed in 1938 in a fire so that his participation has gone unnoticed. In the summer of 1936 and 1937, Macartney was with Winifred Lamb at Kusura in Turkey where he acted as site architect and drew the finds as well as maps, plans and sections for the publication. After the second season in Kusura, one member of Lamb's team, James Rivers Barrington Stewart, conducted his own excavation at Bellapais-Vounous in Cyprus. Macartney went with him and assisted him in 1937 and 1938, drawing "the majority of the cult vessels and a number of the smaller pots, and upon his style of drawing all further work was based. His advice was frequently sought and generously given on subjects connected with draughtsmanship." Stewart was also helped by Macartney with technical information about the manufacture of a wooden bottle.

In August and September 1936, Macartney used his spare time to travel in Turkey, Greece and Germany and published an article about the city of Ankara in the following year. Ankara had become the new Turkish capital in 1923. After large parts had burned down in 1917, the city was redesigned and rebuilt by German and Austrian architects. Macartney gave a critical appraisal of the results. While "On the whole, the general disposition of the buildings and lay-out of the streets seems to be quite good", he says of the administrative quarter that "the whole thing is on such an enormous scale that it is quite impossible to appreciate the way in which the various vistas and axes are handled. It is all so rigid that the buildings seem to have been forced into the ground." Furthermore, the large windows and flat roofs of the new government buildings "are rather a mistake in view of the very extreme type of climate of central Turkey".

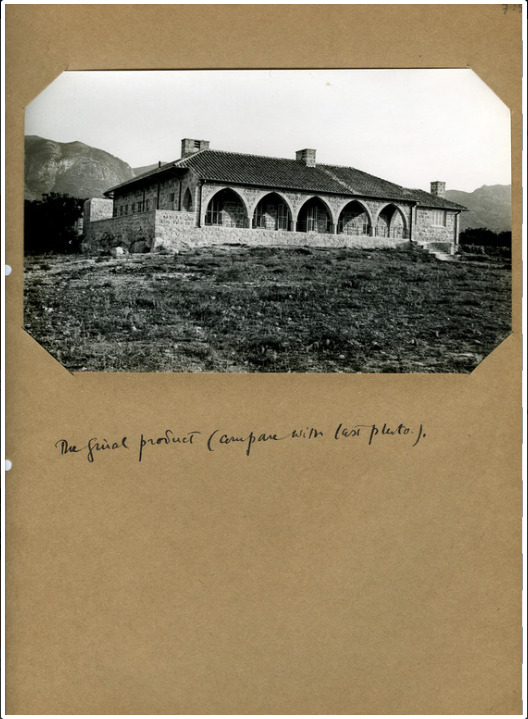
OGS Crawford's house

O. G. S. Crawford, pioneer of aerial archaeology and editor of the journal Antiquity, was a frequent visitor of James and Eleanor Stewart at Vounous. In 1936 he had bought a bit of land in nearby Kyrenia, where he wanted to build a house for his retirement. As architect he chose Macartney. The house was built in 1937–1938. It was an L-shaped single storey house with arched verandahs on three sides in the typical vernacular style. As lintel over the entrance an antique stone with the carving of a vine-scroll was used. Inside, Macartney decorated the walls with six murals "inspired by the local associations and scenery" like blown-up wall drawings in pen and ink: Aphrodite rising from the sea, the road through the pass to Nicosia, a donkey at a well, horses threshing and oxen plowing, and a very abstract outline of Kyrenia Castle.

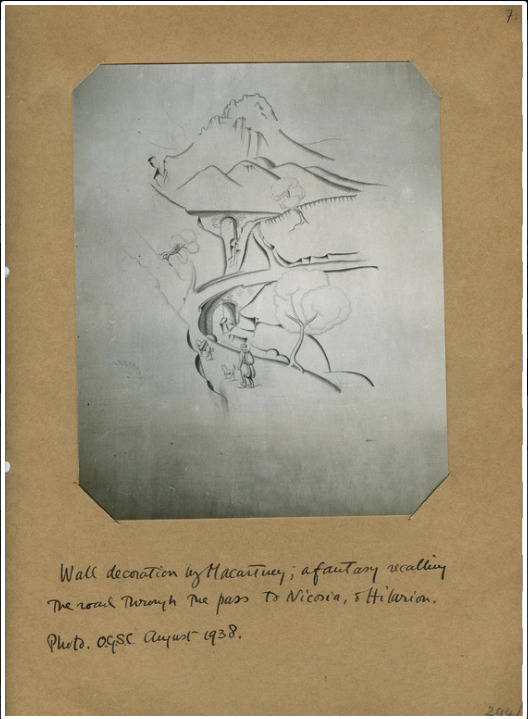
Wall decoration by Macartney

Crawford never lived in the house. During the war he rented it to tenants and finally sold it. Today it houses a restaurant within a hotel compound. On the side facing the sea, a glazed dining room has been added, and the murals are no longer visible. According to Crawford, "Macartney made a very good job of it, and subsequently – largely on the strength of this achievement – got an architectural post in the Cyprus government service."

== Book covers ==
"Mac is doing a sketch. It is a sketch of the mound – a highly formalized view, but one which I admire very much. There are no human beings to be seen; just curving lines and patterns. I realize that Mac is not only an architect. He is an artist. I ask him to design a jacket for my new book." This is how Agatha Christie described the beginning of her collaboration with Macartney as cover artist. Between 1936 and 1938, he designed four dust-wrappers for her, the originals of which are still in possession of Agatha Christie's family. The books were three novels and a collection of short stories, all featuring Hercule Poirot. Macartney's cover designs differed greatly from the previous jackets. While they showed an exciting moment from the plot or an important object, he depicts the setting, replacing suspense and drama with atmosphere and a sense of place. Stylistically, Macartney used the same simple forms as in his architectural drawings and watercolours. Instead of blending the colours, he put them next to each other and created transitions through a row of hatching in the darker colour. The decoratively stylised clouds and waves were used again later at the mosaic inside of State House in Freetown.

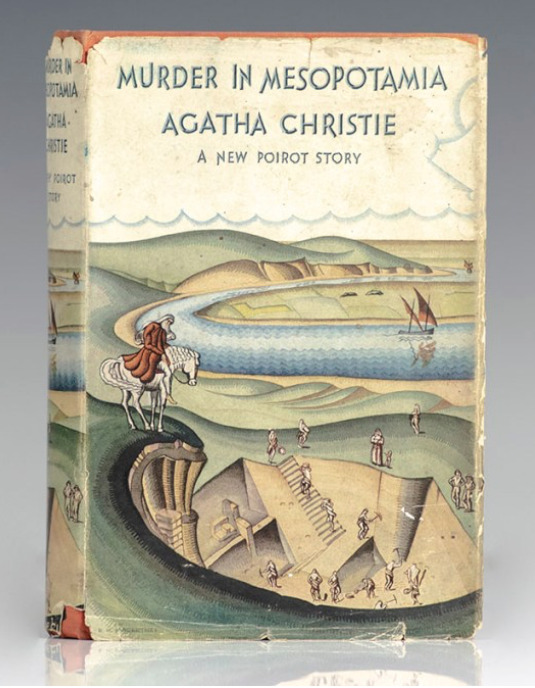
Agatha Christie, Murder in Mesopotamia, dust jacket of the first edition, 1936

The first book, Murder in Mesopotamia, is set in the expedition house of the fictional excavation site Tell Yarimjah on the banks of the Tigris. While the dig is based on Leonard Woolley's excavation of Ur of the Chaldees, where Agatha Christie and Max Mallowan had first met, Macartney's cover recalls the excavation at the ancient city of Dura-Europos which he had visited with the Mallowans on 8 November 1934 during the Habur Survey. It shows a view of the Euphrates and Mesopotamia from the high escarpment at Dura-Europos. At the same time it provides a glimpse of the excavation where little staffage figures are busy at work or watching. An old horseman directs the view into the deep cut in the ground. His cloak and the sails of a felucca are the only instances of strong colour, and the reflection of the sails in the water is the only deviation of the simplified and repetitive forms.

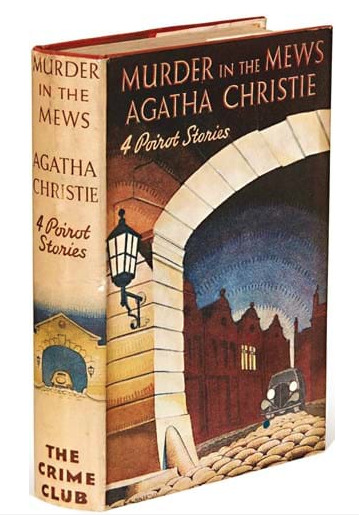
Agatha Christie's Murder in the Mews, dust jacket of the first edition, 1937

On the cover of Murder in the Mews Macartney illustrated the title story. He not only literally shows the view into a mews, but also what the witnesses saw on the night of the murder. From a low viewpoint, the eye is led over the cobbles to a car with bright lights. Considering Macartney's penchant for simplification, this car may be identified with the standard swallow saloon car that was spotted outside the victim's flat. It is seen again on the spine, this time from the back. The illuminated flat in the fictional Bardsley Gardens Mews belongs to a group of houses that resemble Adam's Row which in 1937 was renamed from Adam's Mews. Light seems to radiate from behind the houses, with the flat as its centre. The tonal gradation of the colours of the night sky with Macartney's typical rows of hatching is suggestive of fireworks, as it is bonfire night, the 5th of November. Together with the lines of the lighted mews arch, they seem to converge at the flat where the murder took place.

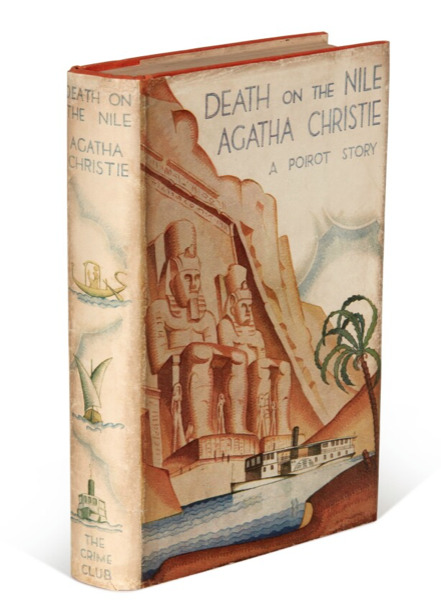
Death on the Nile, dust jacket of the first edition

Late in the same year, on 1 November 1937, Death on the Nile was published. Macartney illustrated the beginning of chapter ten: "The steamer was moored to the bank and a few hundred yards away, the morning sun just striking it, was a great temple carved out of the face of the rock. Four colossal figures, hewn out of the cliff, look out eternally over the Nile and face the rising sun." On the cover, just two of the statues of Ramesses II at the Great Temple of Abu Simbel are shown. The paddle steamer moored before it is smaller than the SS Karnak of the book as it does not have a glass-enclosed saloon and has only two decks. It looks more like the Memnon, which was used for the 1978 film, or the Chonsu. Again, Macartney chose a low viewpoint, making the colossi seem even more impressive. On the spine, three Egyptian ships are shown: a mythical solar barque with Ra, a traditional felucca and a modern steamer. The sun god Ra, in his falcon-headed form as Ra-Horakhty, travelled through the sky to light the day and through the underworld at night. This jacket is regarded as one of the best Agatha Christie covers and has been described as "one of his [Macartney's] most beautiful and perhaps one of the most stunning in all jacket design history."

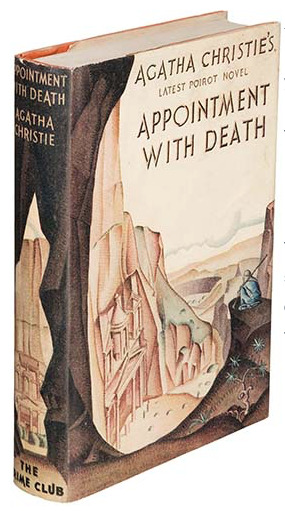
Appointment with Death

For Appointment with Death Macartney again illustrated a passage from the book: "The way wound down – down into the ground. The shapes of rock rose up round them – down, down into the bowels of the earth, through a labyrinth of red cliffs. They towered now on either side. Sarah felt stifled – menaced by the ever-narrowing gorge. She thought confusedly to herself: “Down into the valley of death – down into the valley of death ..." The arrival at Petra is one of the most atmospheric parts of the book. Framed by dark and oppressive rocks, the view on the cover is led down a narrow gorge. To the left and on the spine, the treasury is to be seen. It does not appear in the book, but without it the place would not have been identifiable. The spine, showing the view from the Siq, is even closer to the description in the novel. Macartney used a repoussoir to create depth on all covers, but never to such effect as here.

Thirteen years later, Agatha Christie used Macartney's private background for one of her heroes in They Came to Baghdad: Henry "Carmichael had been born in Kashgar where his father was a Government official." "A boy who had been born or who had lived in some outlandish part of the world – Turkestan, Afghanistan?" Carmichael speaks an unusually long list of languages – "Arabic, Kurdish, Persian, Armenian, Hindustani, Turkish and many mountain dialects". While this makes perfect sense in the context of the novel, it may also have been written with Macartney in mind. Although Macartney later learned to speak Greek and Portuguese fluently, he had famously refused to learn Arabic and instead resorted to a system of gestures and whistles.

== Public Works Department ==
=== Cyprus ===
In April 1939 Macartney joined the buildings branch of the Public Works Department (PWD) in Cyprus and remained there until 1946. He rose through the ranks from temporary architect to senior architect in 1944. In the first year he designed the residence for the Commissioner of Nicosia and two buildings for the English School as well as making alterations to the court house at Paphos.

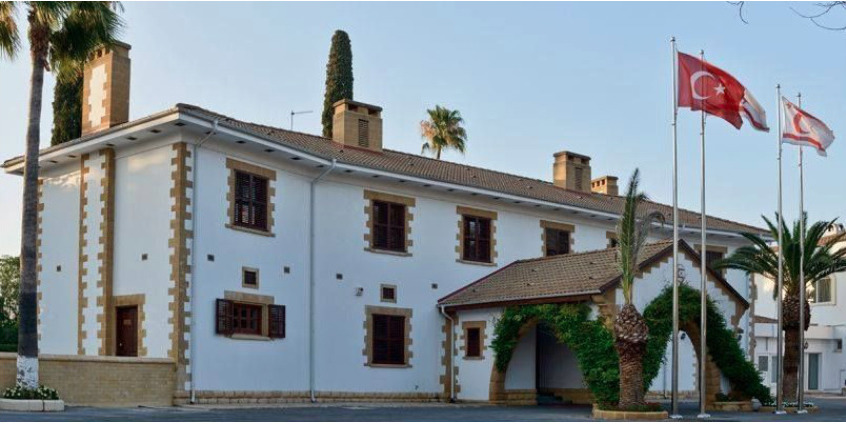
Presidency building

The residence for the Commissioner of Nicosia, Leslie Stuart Greening (1895-1986), was situated on the Quirini Bastion of the city walls. The Department of Antiquities laid down a line behind which the residence had to be built in order not to detract from the view of the bastion below. The side wings are "angled slightly inwards to embrace the visitor." Yellow quoins add to the friendly and welcoming appearance of the building. Everything, "from the hidden lighting in the walls right down to the roll for the toilet paper", had been manufactured in Cyprus. After independence in 1960, the first vice-president, Fazil Küçük, moved into the building. It was the residence of the President of the Turkish Republic of Northern Cyprus until May 2025 and is currently being converted into a museum.

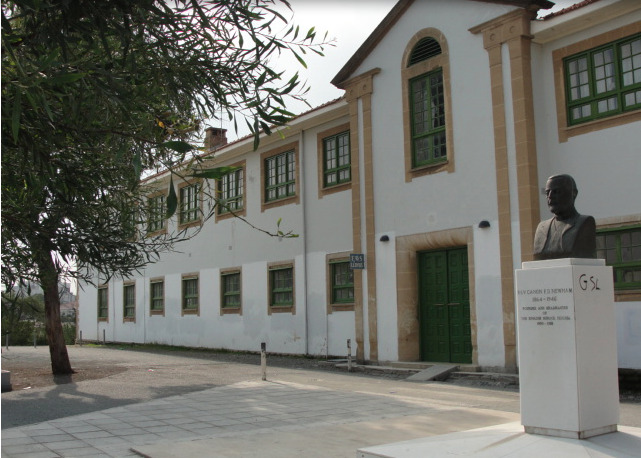
Lloyds Building of the English School, Nicosia, Cyprus

The English School at Nicosia, founded in 1900, came under government control in 1936 and moved to its present site in 1938. Macartney designed the assembly hall and the boarding house called Lloyds building, which was completed in 1941. The function of the assembly hall is expressed in the outward design: the elongated windows have a draped arch which reminds of a proscenium. Over the doors, a lion, the emblem of the school, rests its paw on a book with a theatre mask. The Lloyds building has a simple, modern and elegant facade. On the western side, Macartney took up the arcades of the main building at ground level, but with rounded arches. Today the building is no longer a boarding house. The dormitories have been converted into classrooms.

In 1940, Macartney designed the Doctor's House for the sanatorium at Kyperounda in the Troodos Mountains. The dry climate there was beneficial in the treatment of tuberculosis and so in 1939 a new sanatorium was built. It started operating in 1942. The doctor's house with its steep roof and sheltered entrance was perfectly adapted to the climate and its surroundings. The front facade, like the houses in the village, is clad with local stone while the back is plain. The first inhabitant was Charles Edward Bevan (1905-1956). The building is no longer in use. In 1943 Macartney proposed an elaborate design for staff quarters of the sanatorium. Due to a lack of money, material and manpower, the design had to be drastically simplified. It was built from 1947 to 1949 by Michaelides Bros., the firm of Polyvios Michaelides (1907-1960) who had worked with Le Corbusier and designed the sanatorium. The now block-like building, also clad in local stone, dominates the landscape.

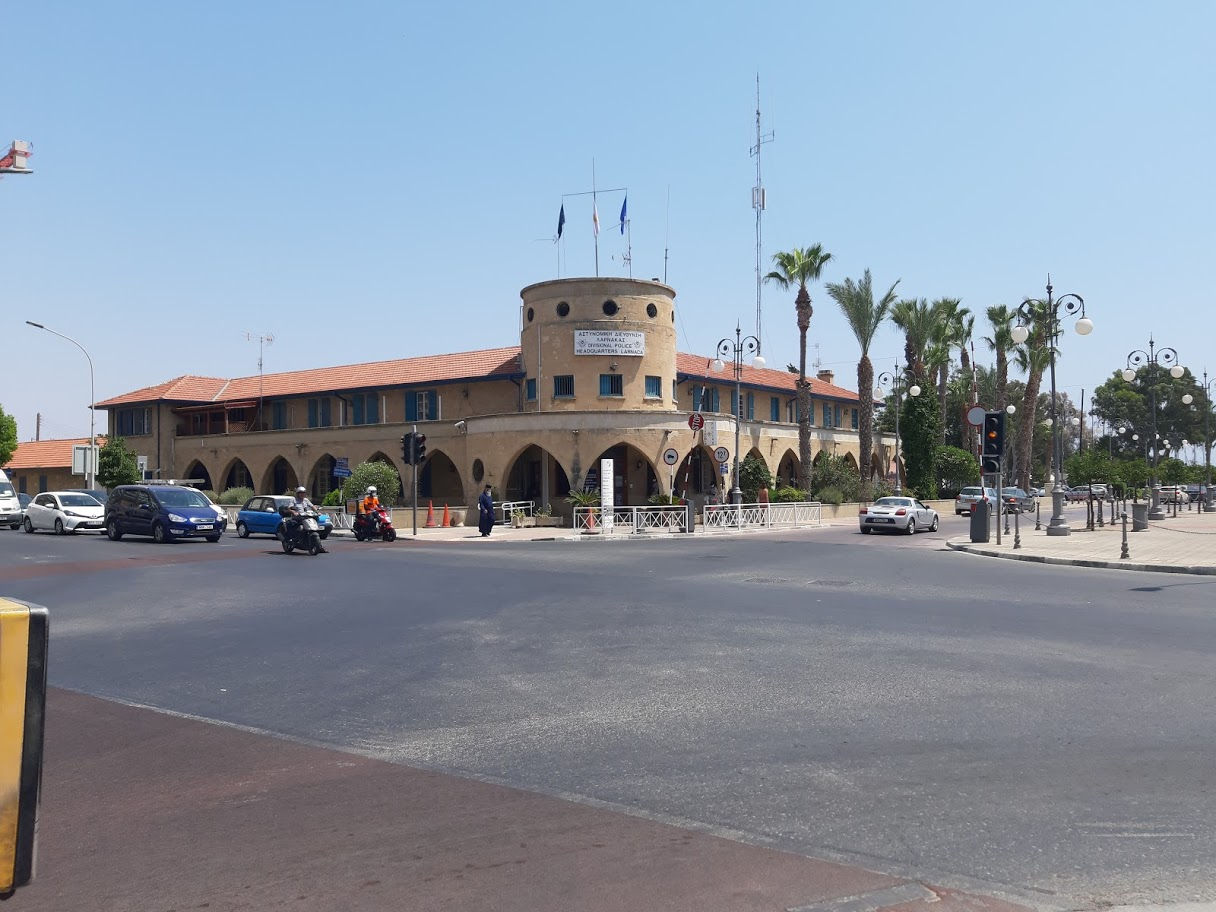
Larnaca Police Station

In 1940, Macartney also designed the police station at Larnaca, now the police headquarters. The striking building extends in both directions from a round tower at a street corner. The squat tower, not unlike a Martello tower, retains something of the defensive nature of the medieval fort which housed the police station and prison before it was transferred to Macartney's building. In 1941, Macartney designed the police stables at Lefkoniko.

The following years saw a number of proposals for official residences for colonial officers as well as housing schemes for Cypriot villagers and workers. The designs were drawn up by various architects of the PWD. Macartney was "rather more sympathetic and sensitive than many of his colleagues", arguing that standard plans for village houses "would tend to discourage all originality and any natural talent for planning and design that village masons and carpenters may possess." Despite the housing shortage, construction was delayed due to the lack of material, and some of the houses were never built. Equally, Macartney's ideas and designs for multi-storey buildings in the town centers with working class flats did not succeed. Government officials were concerned that a large concentration of workers in the towns would lead to local insurrection. Other projects of 1944 included alterations and additions to the General Hospital of Nicosia (demolished) and additional offices for the Court of Cyprus.

After a ten-month leave at the time of his father's illness and death Macartney returned to Cyprus in July 1945. During his last year, he proposed a design for the Konak at Morphou, a public building that housed, among others, the Post Office, the District Medical Officer, the Dispensary and the Courtroom. There had already been a design by William Caruana from 1938, and when building finally began in 1957 opposite Inönü Square, it was not from Macartney's design, but from yet another one.

As architect, Macartney was exempt from war service. However, during the war the entire staff of the PWD became a Royal Engineers Company, and between 1940 and 1943 Macartney carried out various defence works on behalf of the naval and military authorities. He adapted standard designs supplied by the navy and the army and also contributed original designs.

In September 1946, Macartney was transferred to Sierra Leone.

=== Africa ===
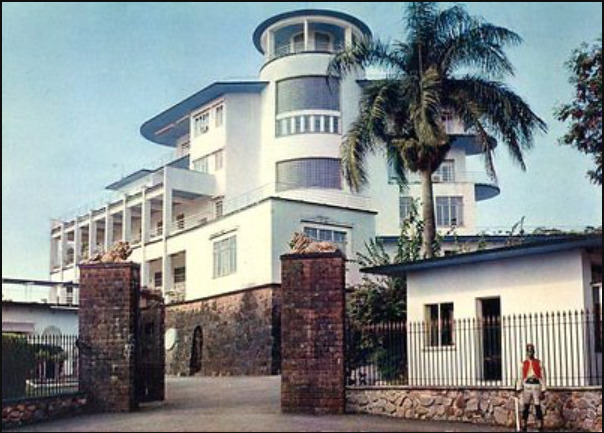
State House, Freetown, Sierra Leone

When Macartney arrived in Freetown in October 1946, he not only filled the vacant position of senior architect but also took over the duties of town planning officer. Despite the long list of buildings constructed by the PWD during Macartney's service, only three can be ascribed to him with certainty: the first terminal for the civil airport at Lungi, now Freetown International Airport (q.v.), the reconstruction of Government House, which became State House (q.v.), the official residence of the President of Sierra Leone, and a block of flats for the Government Rest House.

The Government Rest House had evolved from the Transit Camp which had been completed by the PWD in 1944. It provided temporary accommodation and meals for newly arrived civil servants, officers and others on their way to the provinces. Early in 1951 it was decided to build a block of eight flats on two floors. The construction went swiftly, and by the end of the year the flats were completed. To this first block, designed by Macartney, another block was added in 1958 and a third in 1980. It is at present not possible to determine which of the blocks is the one by Macartney. After independence, the compound became the Brookfields Hotel and is now, after a colourful history, the New Brookfields Hotel.

In addition to his work with the PWD, Macartney was one of the first members of the newly founded Monuments and Relics Commission. Due to his experience with archaeology, the director of Public Works, also a member, had proposed his inclusion. In December 1947, when he was on leave, Macartney took a small round earthenware pot to Hermann Justus Braunholtz (1888-1963) at the British Museum for his opinion. Macartney also designed a glass cabinet for the display of exhibits. It was made by the Faremi Works of Sierra Leone wood and was, in the absence of a museum, placed in the library of the British Council. In the same year, Macartney prepared plans for a plinth of the Kissy Gun, a small cannon from a slave ship. Likewise, he later prepared a plan for the re-erection of the Pademba Road Gun.

In 1954, after his marriage, Macartney was transferred to Zomba in Nyasaland (Malawi) where he arrived in November. So far, nothing is known of his work there.

Macartney was an excellent horseman and rode point to point. During one race his horse dropped dead under him. He damaged his left shoulder so badly in the fall that in 1961 he had to take early retirement due to disability.

== Portugal ==
Looking for a warm and affordable place to retire, the Macartneys settled on Portugal and bought the Tapada do Falcão near Caia da Urra, Portalegre. Macartney designed the house, a stable block for their two horses and a staff house. Following in the footsteps of his parents, he also designed the garden around the house and planted pines, eucalyptus and other trees to complement the already existing cork oaks. The house consists of three wings with open ends towards the back and has been changed considerably by subsequent owners. While it was being built, the Macartneys stayed at Quinta da Relva with the Irish author, journalist and translator Huldine Violet Beamish (1904-1965) and Helen Letitia Frazer (1918-2008), a descendant of George William Robinson. Macartney's wife Fenella illustrated Beamish's book Cavaliers of Portugal which appeared posthumously in 1966. The British surrealist painter Tristram Hillier, a frequent summer guest at Quinta da Relva from 1965 onwards, was later to sign Macartney's last will and testament as witness.

Macartney devoted his retirement to painting, training his horse and archaeology. Together with his wife, who shared his interest, he discovered several prehistoric, Celtic and Roman sites on his estate and in the surrounding area. The most important of these were Castro de Segovia between Elvas and Campo Maior, discovered in 1969 and excavated in 1972 by John Davies Evans and José Morais Arnaud, and Monte da Faia, which they found in 1972. After Macartney's death in the following year, his widow donated their collection to the Museu Geológico de Lisboa and continued their archaeological work.

== Known artworks ==
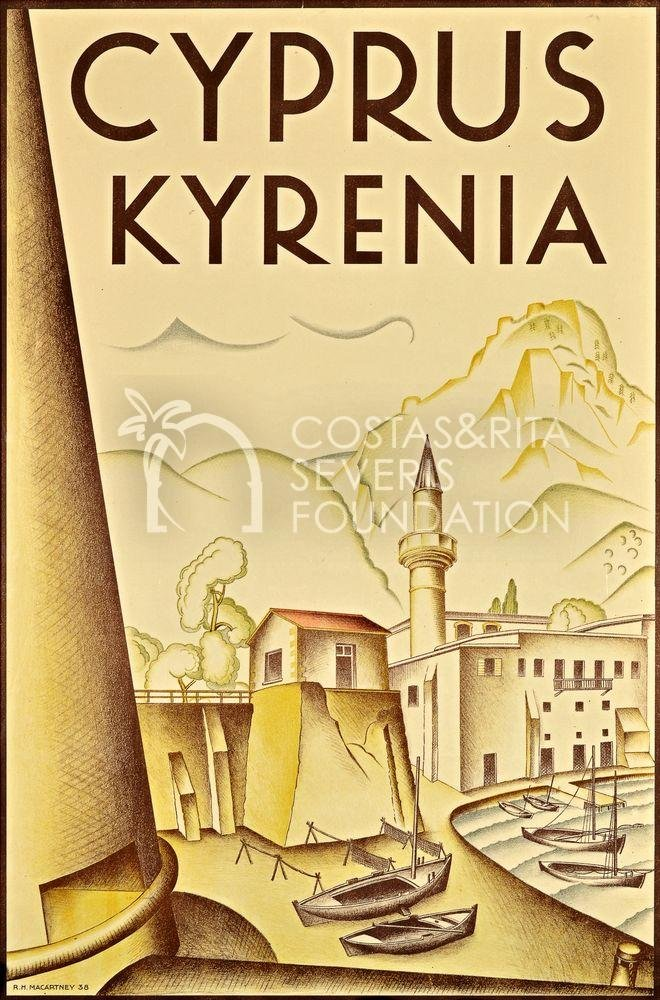
Poster of Kyrenia by R. H. Macartney, 1938

In addition to his architectural and archaeological drawings, Macartney produced paintings throughout his life. As all works were put up for auction in Lisbon after the death of his wife, today only a handful are known.

His earliest known work is a perspective drawing of the interior of San Spirito in Florence, which was exhibited at the Architectural Association and was published in The Builder in 1933 while he was still a student (location unknown).

Another picture shown at the annual exhibition of the Architectural Association in 1933 was one of two works singled out by the art critic of The Times: „Some of the best things from an architectural point of view, such as … "A Street in Florence," in a Piranesi mood, by Mr. R. H. Macartney, fail somewhat as pictures.“ This work was again exhibited at the 166th exhibition of the Royal Academy of Arts in London in 1934. The picture was sold to Esler Dening for five pounds and five shillings (location unknown). At about the same time, he exhibited Banbury Parish Church at the 6th annual exhibition of the British Empire Society of Arts in the nearby Burlington Galleries. In a review, this painting was listed as one of the "few acceptable things" (location unknown).

Agatha Christie owned not only the original designs for the four bookcovers, but also a 1935 sketch of beehive houses near Ras-el-Ain in North Syria and two watercolours with views of Chagar Bazar and Tell Brak. The latter, signed and dated 1937, hung in her bedroom at Greenway House until the end of her life. These works are still in possession of Agatha Christie's family.

In 1938 Macartney designed a travel poster of Kyrenia in Cyprus. The striking image shows all the sights at once – Kyrenia Castle, the old town and the harbour, Saint Hilarion Castle - but only hints at them, thus raising curiosity.

From his time in Sierra Leone dates a painting of the Ebenezer Methodist Church in Freetown, situated in High Broad Street in Murray Town. It is one of the oldest churches in Freetown. (Private collection) In 1953, Macartney designed the cover of the new series of the Sierra Leone Studies „at the shortest of notice“. The drawing shows a lion in front of two mountains, a pictorial representation of the country's name.

The last known work is a small ink drawing of his house in Portugal as seen from the garden, complete with hoe and watering can. It is dated 1963. (Private collection)

== Personal life and death ==
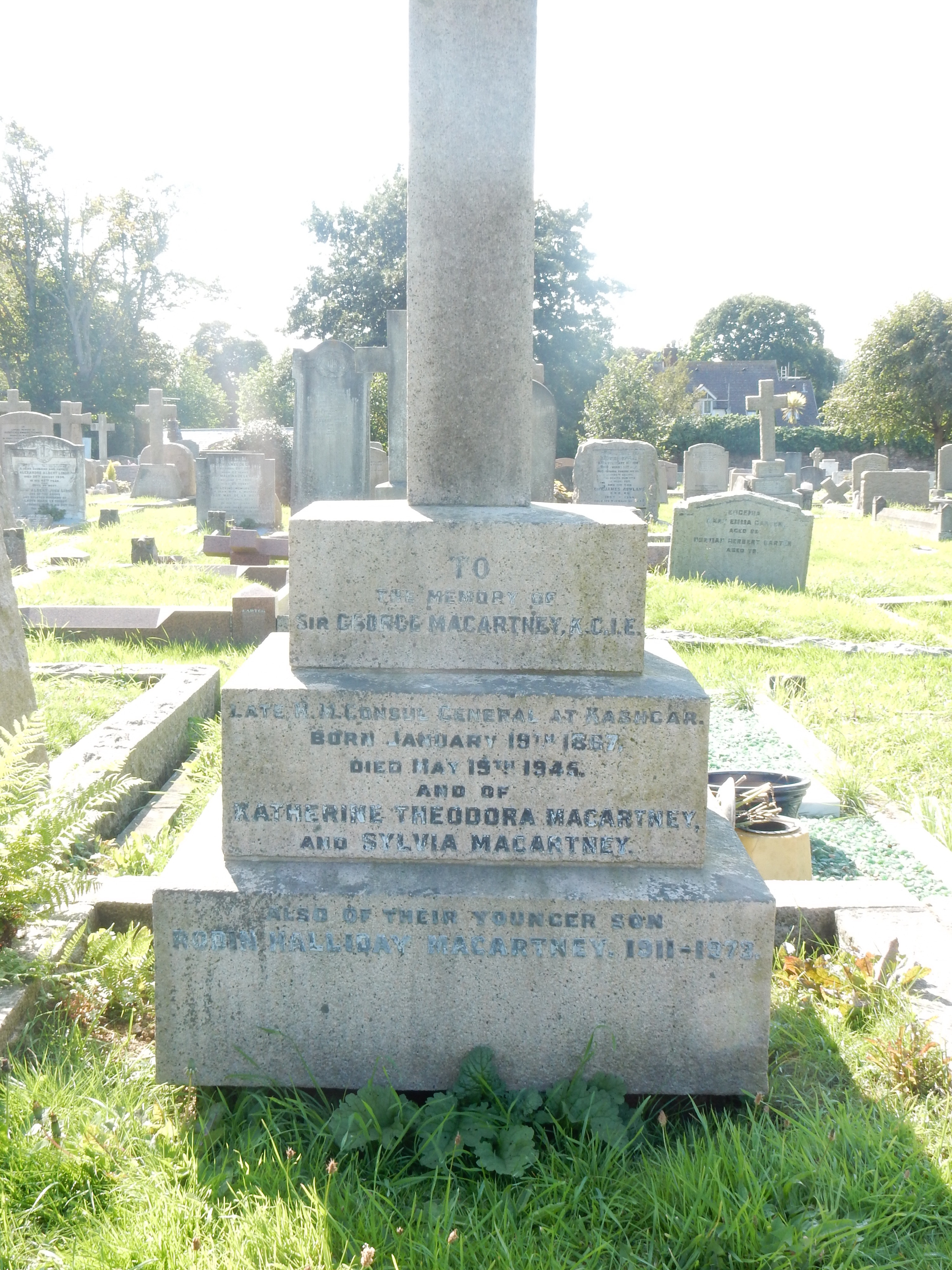
Macartney family grave

Macartney married Fenella Frances Dora Boyle (1918-1984) on 10 September 1954 at St Mary's Church in Bishopsbourne, Kent. He had met her 1938 in Cyprus. Fenella, who had gained the rank of Flying Officer in the Women's Auxiliary Air Force during the war and had served in Egypt, Kenya, Mogadishu and Algeria, was a painter and poet who had spent much of her life painting in France. She was the daughter of the aviator Alan Reginald Boyle (1886-1958) and Isabel Julia Hull (1893-1977), the granddaughter of David Boyle, 7th Earl of Glasgow, and a cousin of Bernard Fergusson, Baron Ballantrae.

Macartney died of cancer at the King Edward VII Hospital in Midhurst, West Sussex, on 4 October 1973. He is buried in the family grave with his parents and his sister in St. Saviour's churchyard on the Isle of Jersey (see photograph).

Macartney was an unusually shy and quiet man, qualities said to be inherited from his father. According to Max Mallowan, he "had inherited something of his father's talents in his capacity for hard work, his ability to come to grips with detail, his perseverance and persistence." A colleague in the Public Works Department in Cyprus, the architect Andreas Meletiou, "remembers him as a shy young man, but he had a strong and personal way of doing architecture, creating the most interesting designs of his period, and he was well-informed of what was happening in the world of architecture outside Cyprus."

== Publications ==
"San Spirito, Florence", in: The Builder: A Journal for the Architect and Constructor , vol. 145, Nov 24, 1933, p. 814.

"Ankara, the Capital of Modern Turkey", in: The Builder: A Journal for the Architect and Constructor , vol. 152, June 4, 1937, pp. 1171-1174.

Macartney, Fenella, Macartney, Robin, Arnaud, José Morais. "Os Povoados Pré e Proto-Históricos de Baldio (Arronches) e Serra de Segóvia (Campo Maior) – Notícia Preliminar", in: Actas do II Congresso Nacional de Arqueologia, Coimbra 1970, vol. II, Coimbra, Ministério da Educação Nacional, p. 627.

== Sources ==
RIBA Nomination Papers for ARIBA, 1936

RIBA Nomination Papers for FRIBA, 1945
