= Chini-Bagh =

Coordinates: 39.47545°N 75.98°E

Chini-Bagh was the Kashgar, Xinjiang residence of George Macartney, Britain's consul-general and his wife, Lady Catherine Macartney, for 28 years. Over the years, Chini-Bagh saw a variety of Central Asian explorers, including Aurel Stein, Father Hendricks, Albert von Le Coq, Sven Hedin, A.R.B. Shuttleworth and two of Count Otani's Central Asian archaeologists/spies, Eizaburo Nomura and Zuicho Tachibana.

Although the house still stands, its famed gardens were later destroyed to make room for the Chini Bagh hotel.
