= A. R. B. Shuttleworth =

British Indian Army officer

Brigadier Allen Robert Betham Shuttleworth (20 February 1873 – 30 July 1935) was an officer in the British Indian Army and player of The Great Game.

Shuttleworth was born in Dapoli, North-West Provinces, India, to Allen Thornton Shuttleworth, who won the Albert Medal of the First Class, and Laura Phoebe Betham. His younger brother was Sir Digby Shuttleworth. Shuttleworth joined the British Army relatively late, beginning his career in the militia.

For a time in 1908, Shuttleworth was acting Consul in Kashgar while George Macartney was in England. During this time, Shuttleworth became involved in investigating the expeditions of Eizaburo Nomura and Zuicho Tachibana, even dining with them at Chini-Bagh. Shuttleworth reported his suspicions to Sir Francis Younghusband, and these suspicions about the two Japanese eventually made its way to Lord Morley, Secretary of State for India.

Shuttleworth died suddenly in Ajmer, Rajasthan.
