= Father Hendricks =

Dutch Roman Catholic missionary (1846–1906)

Father Hendricks (March 17, 1846, in Venlo – June 22, 1906, in Kashgar) was a Dutch Roman Catholic missionary. Accompanied by a Polish nobleman called Adam Ignatovich whom he had met in Omsk on his way to Chinese Turkestan, Hendricks arrived in Kashgar in 1885 and remained there until his death. During his stay in Kashgar, Hendricks clashed with Nikolai Petrovsky, the Russian consul-general, and lived for a time with George Macartney at Chini-Bagh. Hendricks frequently had to travel to British India, and despite good relations with Macartney, he occasionally had troubles crossing the border. British agent Ralph Cobbold reported that in the late 1890s Hendriks was detained by the British for several weeks at Hunza on the border with Xinjiang. Hendricks ran his church out of a mud hut and was apparently able to only convert one person, a Chinese cobbler, during his time in Kashgar. Father Hendricks died of throat cancer and was carried to his grave by a Cossack escort.
