= Come, Tell Me How You Live =

Autobiography by Agatha Christie

- Dust-jacket illustration of the first UK edition
- Author: Agatha Christie
- Language: English
- Subject: Archaeology, Travel
- Genre: Autobiography; Travel literature
- Publisher: William Collins
- Publication date: November 1946
- Publication place: United Kingdom
- Media type: Print (hardback & paperback)
- Pages: 192 pp (first edition, hardcover)
- Preceded by: The Hollow
- Followed by: The Labours of Hercules

Come, Tell Me How You Live is a short book of autobiography and travel literature by crime writer Agatha Christie. It is one of only two books she wrote and had published under both of her married names of "Christie" and "Mallowan" (the other being Star Over Bethlehem and other stories) and was first published in the UK in November 1946 by William Collins and Sons and in the same year in the US by Dodd, Mead and Company. The UK edition retailed for ten shillings and sixpence (10/6) and the US edition at $3.00.

== Title ==
The book's title, a quote from verse three of the White Knight's poem, Haddocks' Eyes from chapter eight of Through the Looking-Glass (1871) by Lewis Carroll, is also word play on the word "Tell", used to describe an archaeological mound or site.

== Background ==
Christie first thought of writing the book in 1938 and wrote to her literary agent, Edmund Cork, in July of that year, suggesting the project and telling him that it would be "not at all serious or archaeological". In the event, she wrote the book during the Second World War after her husband, Max Mallowan, had been posted to Egypt with the British Council in February 1942 and she was living alone in London. She occupied her hours by working in a hospital dispensary, using the knowledge she had gained doing the same job in the First World War working two full days, three half-days and alternate Saturday mornings and, "The rest of the time, I wrote."

She added, "It is only now that I fully realise, looking back over my wartime output, that I produced an incredible amount of stuff over those years." One of those books was Come, Tell Me How You Live. She wrote this book "out of nostalgia" feeling badly the separation from Max and wanting to recapture the "poignant remembrance of our days in Arpachiyah and Syria." She admitted herself that it was "light-hearted and frivolous" but that it was an accurate reflection of the time and events that the book portrays. Christie finished the book in June 1945, one month after a delighted reunion with her husband and passed it round for comment and opinion about the suitability for publication. Supportive of the work was Stephen Glanville (who had previously assisted with the play Akhnaton and pushed Christie into writing Death Comes as the End), Edmund Cork and Max himself to who it was given as a homecoming present. Less enthusiastic was Sidney Smith, Keeper of the Department of Egyptian and Assyrian Antiquities at the British Museum. He was a family friend and cautioned her that, "while the whole thing is thoroughly enjoyable reading, I am not quite sure that you would be wise to print it at all."

Another party who was unenthusiastic about the book was her publisher, William Collins and Sons, who were "suspicious and disapproving" but "the book was a success, and I think they then regretted that paper was so short."

Christie's chronology is concatenated and somewhat confused in the book from the actual events of the 1930s although she never specifies any year. In the last two months of 1934, Christie joined Max and a young architect Robin Macartney (called Mac in the book) on a surveying expedition in Syria. Mallowan's previous expedition and the first he commanded had been in Arpachiyah, north-east of Ninevah in Iraq in 1933 but that country had become too dangerous, hence the move. In describing the departure from Victoria Station, Christie names her daughter Rosalind as being fourteen when she was in fact one year older. Robin Macartney was a talented though shy draughtsman who later drew the dustjackets for four of Christie's 1930's UK editions (Murder in Mesopotamia, Murder in the Mews, Death on the Nile and Appointment with Death). She also wrote how she unsuccessfully tried to make herself like cigarettes by smoking two a day for six months. Max also tried to introduce her to various wines, but acknowledged defeat, so had the battle of obtaining water for her in restaurants.

The book then gives the impression that only one season was exclusively conducted at Chagar Bazar whereas the Mallowans were there for two years (1935–36). The narrative then further complicates matters by stating that other members joined these first expeditions such as Colonel Burn (referred to as "the Colonel" in the book) and Louis Osman (called "Bumps" after his own description of the Tells). In reality these two members and others joined the expedition in the spring of 1937 when the team extended their efforts to excavating not just at Chagar Bazar but also Tell Brak. The chronology then reverts to being correct when the Mallowans finish at these sites and move for a short period of time to the Balikh Valley in 1938. In 1939 the international situation was deemed to be too dangerous to continue and the Mallowans did not recommence their archaeological work until 1947 with another surveying expedition, this time returning to Iraq.

== Reception and critical analysis ==
Christie described the book in her own foreword as, "small beer – a very little book, full of everyday doings and happenings". There is little effort made to educate the reader in the ancient history of the places that are being excavated or in the methods of archaeology itself. Instead she paints a vivid picture of the human side of their expeditions and the personalities, both European and Asiatic, involved. The latter, in particular, are presented in a very sympathetic manner. Christie's infectious enthusiasm for the region, its peoples and the life they led while working there comes through in the work in a way which led Jacquetta Hawkes (who worked with the Mallowans in Nimrud in the 1950s) to describe the book in a foreword to the 1983 Bodley Head edition as "a pure pleasure to read". In her 2007 biography of Christie, Laura Thompson writes that the book, "is written to please one person, at least: her husband. It has a slightly manic style, as different as can be from that of her fiction, although in its way the book is equally artful".

Professor Rushbrook Williams in The Times Literary Supplement of 28 December 1946 was less impressed: "The enthusiasts of detective fiction who regard the publication of a new "Agatha Christie" as a landmark will experience something of a shock when they turn over these pages. Here is no ingenious plot, no artfully contrived love-interest, no unmasking after satisfying suspense, of the horrid criminal. While those who know something of archaeological work in the Near East, and recognise in Mrs Mallowan's minor misfortunes and victimisations an echo of their own experiences, will sometimes chuckle as they read, the ordinary person will find the whole thing too long drawn out. The book, indeed, is reminiscent of the 'letters from dear Uncle William' types of literature – excellent for reading aloud by those, and to those, who know Uncle William, but a shade tedious to persons outside the family circle."

Elizabeth Monroe in the 24 November 1946 issue of The Observer opined that, "For all its flippancy the book is a contribution to literature on the Middle East. For it contains nostalgic descriptions of the profusion of mounds that mark bygone lives, and of the silence that surrounds them now, and of the flowers that cover them if you arrive on the right morning in the spring."

A review by "H.J.F." in The Guardian's issue of 22 November 1946 stated that the idea of writing the book was, "characteristically bright" and concluded, "The reader need not expect to find anything here about the famous Mallowan excavations which have done so much to fill out the heretofore thin web of the story of the origins of cultivation. That is to be sought in learned journals, and Agatha Christie's part therein is no small one. We wonder how many of the people who enjoy her books think of their being written, as often as not, in the desert amid mounds of forgotten cities in a region that was once full of life."

John Lanchester described the book as "a serious contender for the least revealing autobiographical book ever written, strongly rivalled by her Autobiography, which does at least contain some factual details from her childhood."

== References to other works ==
As well as a foreword and a short epilogue (dated spring 1944), Christie provides a poem A-sitting on a Tell which mimics the White Knight's poem, Haddocks' Eyes (See Explanation of the book's title above). Christie references this allusion by way of a printed apology to Carroll. The line "Come, tell me how you live!" is also quoted by the character of Jane Harding in Book III, Chapter I(i) of Giant's Bread, her 1930 novel published under the pseudonym of Mary Westmacott.

== Publication history ==
- 1946, William Collins and Sons, November 1946, Hardcover, 192 pp
- 1946, Dodd, Mead and Company (New York), Hardcover, 225 pp
- 1976, William Collins and Sons (Revised edition), Hardcover, 192 pp
- 1976, Dodd, Mead and Company (New York), Hardcover, 192 pp
- 1977, Pocket Books (New York), Paperback, 222 pp
- 1983, Bodley Head, Hardcover, 192 pp ISBN 0-370-30563-9
- 1990, Fontana Books (Imprint of HarperCollins), August 1990, Paperback, 208 pp ISBN 0-00-637594-4

The photographs contained in later editions are different from those in the 1946 first edition. The latter contains only photographs of the sites of the digs, the workers and the local population. Later editions included photographs of Christie, Mallowan and some other individuals named in the book.

== International Titles ==
- Czech: Pověz mi, jak žijete (Tell me, how you live)
- Dutch: Speuren naar het verleden (In search of the Past)
- French : Dis-moi comment tu vis (Tell me how you live) in 1978. The book was translated again and published in 2005 under another title, La romancière et l'archéologue : Mes aventures au Moyen-Orient (The Novelist and the Archaeologist : My adventures in the Middle East)
- German: Erinnerung an glückliche Tage (Memories of Happy Days)
- Italian: Viaggiare è il mio peccato (Traveling is my sin)
- Portuguese: Na Síria (In Syria)
