= Murder in the Mews =

1937 novella collection by Agatha Christie

- Dust-jacket illustration of the first UK edition
- Author: Agatha Christie
- Cover artist: Robin Macartney
- Language: English
- Series: Hercule Poirot
- Genre: Detective fiction Short stories
- Publisher: Collins Crime Club
- Publication date: 15 March 1937
- Publication place: United Kingdom
- Media type: Print (hardback & paperback)
- Pages: 288 (first edition, hardback)
- Preceded by: Cards on the Table
- Followed by: Dumb Witness

Murder in the Mews and Other Stories is a collection of four novellas by British writer Agatha Christie, first published in the UK by Collins Crime Club on 15 March 1937. In the US, the book was published by Dodd, Mead and Company under the title Dead Man's Mirror in June 1937 with one story missing (The Incredible Theft); the 1987 Berkeley Books edition of the same title has all four stories. All of the tales feature Hercule Poirot. The UK edition retailed at seven shillings and sixpence (7/6) and the first US edition at $2.00.

== Plot summaries ==
=== Murder in the Mews ===
Japp asks Poirot to join him at a house in Bardsley Garden Mews where a Mrs Barbara Allen shot herself the previous evening – Guy Fawkes Night – the moment of death being disguised by the noise of fireworks. Once there, they find that the doctor thinks there is something strange about the death of the fine lady, a young widow. Mrs Allen was found by a housemate, Miss Jane Plenderleith, who had been away in the country the previous night. The victim was locked in her room and was shot through the head with an automatic, the weapon being found in her hand. However, the doctor points out that the gun is in her right hand while the wound is above the left ear – an impossible position to shoot with the right hand. It looks as if this is a murder made to look like suicide – and by an unusually incompetent murderer with a very low estimation of the intelligence of police investigators. They interview Miss Plenderleith and find out that Mrs Allen was engaged to be married to Charles Laverton-West, an up-and-coming young MP but, although the pistol was the dead lady's, she cannot think of a reason why she should use it to commit suicide.

Japp and Poirot find further clues: the gun has been wiped clean of fingerprints, and large sums of money have been withdrawn from Mrs Allen's bank account on several occasions, but there is no trace of money in the house. They also learn from a neighbour that Mrs Allen had a gentleman caller the previous evening whose description doesn't match her fiancé. Feeling that Miss Plenderleith is keeping something back, they ask her about this male visitor, and she suggests that it was Major Eustace – a man that Mrs Allen had known in India and whom she had seen on several occasions in the past year. She felt that Mrs Allen was afraid of the man, and Japp and Poirot suggest that Major Eustace was blackmailing her – an idea that meets with approval from Miss Plenderleith. Poirot points out that it is unusual for blackmailers to kill their victims: normally, it's the opposite way round. As part of his look around the house, Japp searches a cupboard under the stairs which contains items such as umbrellas, walking sticks, tennis racquets, a set of golf clubs, and a small attaché-case which Miss Plenderleith hurriedly claims is hers. The two men sense Miss Plenderleith's heightened tension.

Miss Plenderleith proves to have an impeccable alibi for the time of the death, and Poirot and Japp interview Charles Laverton-West. He is stunned to find out that a murder investigation is taking place and admits that he himself has no sound alibi. When trying to reach Miss Plenderleith by phone, Japp and Poirot hear that she has gone off to play golf. The mention of this suddenly makes Poirot see everything clearly. Managing to get hold of Eustace, they notice that he smokes a brand of Turkish cigarette whose stubs were found in the mews house, even though Mrs Allen smoked a different kind. They also prove that he wore a set of cufflinks, a damaged part of which was found in the room where Mrs Allen died, and Japp arrests him for murder.

On a pretext, Poirot makes Japp call at the mews house. While they are there, Poirot sneaks another look at the cupboard under the stairs and sees that the attaché-case is gone. As Miss Plenderleith has just come back from playing golf at Wentworth, they go there and learn that she was seen on the links with the case. Later investigations show that she was seen to throw the item in the lake there. The police retrieve it but find nothing in it. Poirot asks Japp and Miss Plenderleith to call at his flat, and they tell her of Eustace's arrest. Poirot then tells her of his real conclusions. From clues concerning missing blotting paper, Poirot deduces that Mrs Allen had written a letter just before she died, which, if she killed herself, would indicate a suicide note. He postulates that Miss Plenderleith came home, found her friend dead, driven to kill herself by the actions of her blackmailer, and was determined to avenge her – this wasn't a murder made to look like suicide but a suicide made to look like murder, thereby entrapping the blackmailer. Miss Plenderleith placed the gun in Mrs Allen's right hand, even though she was left-handed, and the purpose of her trip to Wentworth was to hide there the dead lady's golf clubs – left-handed clubs, the attaché-case being a red herring to put the police off the trail. Convinced by Poirot that Major Eustace will be imprisoned for his other crimes, she agrees to tell the truth and save the man from the gallows.

=== The Incredible Theft ===
A house party is underway at the home of Lord Mayfield, a rising politician and a millionaire whose riches came from his engineering prowess. With him are Air Marshal Sir George Carrington, his wife and son (Lady Julia and Reggie); Mrs Vanderlyn, a beautiful brunette American; and Mrs Macatta, a forthright MP. Mr Carlile, Lord Mayfield's secretary, joins them for dinner. The reason for the house party becomes obvious when all but Lord Mayfield and Sir George leave the dinner table, as they will discuss the plans for a new fighter aircraft that would give Britain supremacy in the air. They discuss Mrs Vanderlyn, who is involved in espionage. Lord Mayfield invited her to tempt her with something big – the plans for the new fighter – to trap her once and for all.

All guests retire for bed except Lord Mayfield and Sir George. Carlile is sent to get the plans for the fighter from the safe, so he set off for the study, colliding with Mrs Vanderlyn who wants to retrieve a book she had forgotten in the drawing room. The two men walk along the terrace, when Lord Mayfield is startled by a figure leaving the study by the French window, although Sir George sees nothing. When they enter the study, Carlile has the papers out but Lord Mayfield quickly sees that the plans of the fighter itself are gone. Carlile is adamant that they were in the safe and he put them on the table. He was distracted when he heard a woman's scream in the hallway and ran out to find Leonie, Mrs Vanderlyn's maid, who claimed that she had seen a ghost. Carlile had not otherwise left the study. Sir George suggests calling in Hercule Poirot immediately.

Poirot arrives in the middle of the night. They tell him the sequence of events and their suspicions regarding Mrs Vanderlyn. Investigating the grass leading off the terrace, Poirot confirms that there are no footprints, which means that someone in the house committed the theft and the papers are still there. He questions each person in turn. He understands that Leonie saw no ghost; she screamed because Reggie sneaked up on her to snatch a kiss. Poirot suggests to Lord Mayfield that he end the party so that his guests will leave the house. The next morning the guests begin to leave. Lady Julia believes that her son Reggie stole the plans since he is very short of money and was not in his room for a period the previous evening. She promises Poirot that they will be returned within twelve hours if no further action is taken. Poirot agrees to this and they all depart.

Poirot tells Lord Mayfield of Lady Julia's offer but that she is mistaken, as she does not know that her son was busy with Leonie at the time in question. Poirot explains that Mrs Macatta was heard snoring in her room, Mrs Vanderlyn was heard to call for Leonie from upstairs, and Sir George was with Lord Mayfield on the terrace. Everyone is accounted except for Carlile and Lord Mayfield. As Carlile has access to the safe at all times and could have taken tracings at his leisure, only Lord Mayfield is left. Poirot has no doubts that Lord Mayfield put the plans in his own pocket. His motive is linked back to a denial given some years earlier that he was involved in negotiations with a belligerent foreign power. As he was indeed involved in such activities he must now have been blackmailed to hand over the plans via Mrs. Vanderlyn. Poirot has no doubt that the plans she holds are subtly altered so as to make the design unworkable. Lord Mayfield confesses to the deception but insists that his motive, refusing to be derailed from leading Britain through the coming world crisis, is pure.

=== Dead Man's Mirror ===
When Sir Gervase Chevenix-Gore writes to Hercule Poirot to unceremoniously summon him down to the Chevenix-Gore ancestral pile, Poirot is initially reluctant to go. However, he arranges for an encounter with socialite Mr. Satterthwaite and learns from him enough about the baronet and his family to intrigue him. On arrival at the Chevenix-Gore home, Poirot meets the latter's wife Vanda (an eccentric who believes she is a reincarnation of an Egyptian queen), his adopted daughter Ruth and her cousin Hugo, a Miss Lingard, who is helping Sir Gervase research the family history, and various other friends who are staying at the house. It is clear that no-one was expecting Poirot, and for the first time in memory, Sir Gervase himself, who is always punctual, is missing. Poirot and guests go to his study and find him dead, apparently having shot himself. Poirot is not convinced, however, and soon starts to prove that Sir Gervase was murdered because of various suspicious factors, including the position at which the bullet appears to have struck a mirror.

It is revealed that before Poirot arrived, all the guests and family were dressing for dinner, and after they heard the dinner gong, a shot rang out. No one suspected that anything is wrong, believing that either a car had backfired or champagne was being served. As Chevenix-Gore was not a popular man, there are any number of suspects, including his own daughter and nephew. It is revealed that Hugo is engaged to Susan (another guest at the house) and Ruth has already married Lake (Chevenix-Gore's agent) in secret.

In the end, Poirot assembles everyone in the study. He reveals that Chevenix-Gore intended to disinherit Ruth if she did not marry Hugo Trent. However, it was too late, as she was already married to Lake. Poirot accuses Ruth of killing Chevenix-Gore, but Miss Lingard confesses to the murder.

After everyone else leaves, Miss Lingard explains everything. The bullet which killed Chevenix-Gore hit the gong (as the door to the study was open), which made Susan think that she heard the first gong (dinner was usually served after the butler would strike the gong twice). It was Miss Lingard who smashed the mirror and arranged the room to look like suicide. She popped a paper bag to fake a shot in order to confuse the timeline. Poirot pretended to accuse Ruth because he had no real evidence but suspected the truth: that Miss Lingard was Ruth's real mother, and would save her daughter by confessing. Miss Lingard asks Poirot not to tell Ruth that she is her real mother. Poirot agrees, as Miss Lingard is terminally ill, and Ruth ends the story wondering what could have driven Miss Lingard to commit murder.

=== Triangle at Rhodes ===
Wishing for a quiet holiday free from crime, Poirot goes to Rhodes during the low season in October where there are but a few guests. Aside from the young Pamela Lyall and Sarah Blake, there is Valentine Chantry, a consciously beautiful woman who seems to swoon under the attentions of Douglas Gold. This is done at the expense of his own wife, Marjorie, a mildly attractive seemingly mousy woman, and Valentine's husband, Tony Chantry. This is the "triangle" that everyone observes, and it gets rather absurd with the two men vying for Valentine's favour. She seems to delight in the attention.

Marjorie Gold soon wins the sympathy of many of the guests of the hotel as her husband is frequently in the company of Valentine. She seeks out Poirot's counsel. He warns her to leave the island immediately if she values her life. She says she cannot leave her husband. Poirot shakes his head, sadly. The event comes to a head one evening, beginning when Gold and Chantry have a loud argument. Valentine and Marjorie return from a drive, and the former is found poisoned by the cocktail her husband gave her.

Gold is immediately suspected, as the strophanthin that killed Valentine is found in the pocket of his dinner jacket. Poirot noticed, however, that Chantry put it in Gold's pocket just when everyone's attention was on his dying wife. Poirot gives this information to the police.

He tells Pamela Lyall that she was focusing on the wrong triangle. The real triangle was between Douglas, Marjorie and Chantry. Chantry and Marjorie were having an affair and Chantry, bored with his wife but wanting her fortune, conspired with Marjorie to kill her and ensure that Douglas was blamed for the murder. Poirot's warning to Marjorie Gold was not because he feared she was a victim at risk of being murdered, but the opposite. He was warning her she would be caught, tried, and convicted as one of the culprits, and hanged for murder. He emphasises, "She understood."

== Literary significance and reception ==
Simon Nowell-Smith of The Times Literary Supplement's issue of 27 March 1937 wrote: "It would seem nowadays – it was not true of Sherlock Holmes, when the rules were less rigid – the shorter the detective story the less good it will be. The least effective of the stories in this book occupies 32 pages; the most 96; and there are two of intermediate length and merit. All are of quite a high standard as long-short stories, but none is as good as any of Mrs Christie's full-length detective novels. The fact is that the reader of today demands to participate in a detective story, and no living writer, unless occasionally Miss Sayers, can find room in a short story for this extra detective." The reviewer felt that the title story was the strongest and that Triangle at Rhodes the weakest because, "the psychology of the characters is insufficiently developed to make the solution either predictable or plausible".

Isaac Anderson of The New York Times Book Review of 27 June 1937 said, "The four stories in this book are all fully up to the Agatha Christie-Hercule Poirot standard, and are about as varied in plot and in the characters involved as it is possible for detective stories to be."

The Scotsman of 1 April 1937 said "To the ingenuity of Mrs Agatha Christie there is no end. She writes with Spartan simplicity, presents her clues fairly, and nearly always succeeds in simultaneously mystifying and satisfying her reader. This is no mean achievement in an art which is popularly supposed to be rapidly exhausting a limited stock of deception devices."

In The Observer's issue of 18 April 1937, "Torquemada" (Edward Powys Mathers) wrote: "It is rather for herself than for the four awkwardly shaped Poirot stories which make up Murder in the Mews that I give Agatha Christie first place [in his column] this week. There is sufficient in the latest exploits of the little Belgian to remind us that his creator is our queen of detective writers, but by no means enough to win her that title if she had not already won it. The last and shortest tale, Triangle at Rhodes, is just the one which should have been made the longest, since it is a problem depending entirely on the unfolding of the characters of four people. Mrs Christie has not given herself room for such unfolding, and is therefore constrained to tear the buds brutally apart. This plot would, I think, have furnished forth a whole novel. In the other three stories, each of that long-short form which used to be sacred to the penny detective adventure story, Poirot is but palely himself, and in each case the plot, though clever, is not brilliant. In the name piece the motive of the second crime is legitimately baffling; in The Incredible Theft I kept pace with Poirot; in Dead Man's Mirror, feeling a little cheated, I myself cheated by backing the most exterior of outsiders."

E. R. Punshon of The Guardian reviewed the collection in the 9 April 1937 issue when he wrote that it was "perhaps enough to say that they are all good, but not outstanding, Christie, and that in all of them Monsieur Poirot... is given full opportunity to display his accustomed acumen." Punshon stated that the title story was, "the best, and Mrs Christie is least successful when she enters into the international spy field. The last story is disappointing in that it presents an interesting psychological situation that seems to cry aloud for the fuller treatment. Mrs Christie could well have given it."

Mary Dell in the Daily Mirror of 1 April 1937 said: "Agatha Christie is keeping her famous detective, Poirot, busy. Here he is the murderer-chaser in four short stories which show that this author can keep you as "on edge" in shorter thrillers as in full-length ones. And another good thing is that you can come to the last untying of all the knots in one sitting.

Robert Barnard: "Four very good long short stories. No duds, but perhaps the most interesting is Triangle at Rhodes, with its 'double-triangle' plot, very familiar from other Christies."

== References to other works ==
- The plot device in "Murder in the Mews" is a rewrite of "The Market Basing Mystery", which first appeared in issue 1603 of The Sketch magazine on 17 October 1923 before appearing in book form in the US first in The Under Dog and Other Stories in 1951 and in the UK in Thirteen for Luck! in 1966 (later appearing in Poirot's Early Cases in 1974). The similarities between the two stories are in the eventual solution and motive but the setting, characters and the sex of the victim is different between the two versions.
- "Dead Man's Mirror" uses a similar (almost identical) device to "The Second Gong", with a number of almost point-for-point matches; as well, Mr Satterthwaite, who is known from the Harley Quin Stories has a small appearance, where he refers to the "Crow's nest business", i.e. the novel Three Act Tragedy.
- In "Murder in the Mews", Poirot refers to Sherlock Holmes and "the curious incident of the dog in the night-time". This refers to a statement made by Holmes in the 1892 story "The Adventure of Silver Blaze".
- "Triangle at Rhodes" uses similar settings as Evil Under the Sun. The beautiful but foolish married woman flirting with a younger man and then getting killed is one such similarity.
- "The Incredible Theft" is an almost verbatim reworking of "The Submarine Plans", which was later collected in Poirot's Early Cases.

== Film, TV or theatrical adaptations ==
All four stories featured as one-hour episodes in the ITV series Agatha Christie's Poirot with David Suchet in the title role. The characters of Hastings (as played by Hugh Fraser) and Felicity Lemon (as played by Pauline Moran) appear in all the televised stories except for "Triangle at Rhodes", even though they make no appearance in the published versions. As well as appearing in "Murder in the Mews", the televised versions of "The Incredible Theft" and "Dead Man's Mirror" also feature Philip Jackson as Inspector Japp.

=== Murder in the Mews ===
This was broadcast on 15 January 1989 as the second episode of series one.

Adaptor: Clive Exton
Director: Edward Bennett

Cast:
Gabrielle Blunt as Mrs Pierce
Christopher Brown as a golfer
Bob Bryan as a barman
Barrie Cookson as Dr Brett
John Cording as Inspector Jameson
Nicholas Delve as Freddie
James Faulkner as Major Eustace
Juliette Mole as Jane Plenderleith
Ruskin Moya as a singer
Beccy Wright as a maid
David Yelland as Charles Laverton-West

The adaptation is faithful to the original story and the only two deviations from the original story were the addition of Captain Hastings and replacing Poirot's butler George by Miss Lemon.

=== The Incredible Theft ===
This was broadcast on 26 February 1989 as the eighth episode of series one.

Adaptors: David Reid, Clive Exton
Director: Edward Bennett

Cast:
Guy Scantlebury as Reggie Carrington
Albert Welling as Carlile
Phillip Manikum as a Sergeant
Carmen du Sautoy as Joanna Vanderlyn
John Stride as Tommy Mayfield
Ciaran Madden as Lady Mayfield
Phyllida Law as Lady Carrington
John Carson as Sir George Carrington

This version differs from the story in that the altered aeroplane plans are for the "Mayfield Kestrel" fighter plane (a Supermarine Spitfire) instead of a bomber; Captain Hastings, Chief Inspector Jap and Miss Lemon were added. Lord Mayfield's Christian name is altered from "Charles" to "Tommy" and he is given a wife "Margaret". Also, he was being blackmailed because he had sold howitzers to the Japanese-and gives a (faked) metal alloy formula of the fighter in return for the record of his sale; in comic relief Hastings and Poirot "borrow" a police car to chase Vanderlyn to the German ambassador's home; Inspector Japp fails to find the missing plans; Carrington is a politician instead of an RAF officer; Thomas Mayfield is an arms maker instead of a possible prime minister; and the involvement of Reggie Carrington and Leonie the maid does not take place.

=== Dead Man's Mirror ===
This was broadcast on 28 February 1993 as the seventh episode of series five.

Adaptor: Anthony Horowitz
Director: Brian Farnham

Cast:
Tushka Bergen as Susan Cardwell
Jon Croft as Lawrence
Iain Cuthbertson as Gervase Chevenix
Emma Fielding as Ruth Chevenix
James Greene as Snell
Richard Lintern as John Lake
Jeremy Northam as Hugo Trent
John Rolfe as a Registrar
Fiona Walker as Miss Lingard
Zena Walker as Vanda Chevenix
Derek Smee as an Auctioneer

The adaptation is fairly faithful to the original story, with several notable changes:

- The characters of Godfrey Burrows, Colonel Ned Bury, and Oswald Forbes were omitted.
- As with the ITV adaptation of Three-Act Tragedy, Mr. Satterthwaite was also omitted (making him a rare Agatha Christie character who has never been depicted on screen).
- Major Riddle was replaced with Captain Hastings and Chief Inspector Japp.
- Rather than a baronet, Gervase Chevenix is a wealthy art dealer.
- The telegram from Chevenix and the meeting of Poirot and Mr. Satterthwaite were both replaced by having Poirot meet Gervase Chevenix at an auction where Chevenix buys the titular mirror, knowing that Poirot wants it and intending to use it as leverage to get Poirot to do what he wants.
- Poirot arrives before the murder has occurred and meets with Chevenix, who tells him he suspects John Lake of fraud.
- Colonel Bury convincing Chevenix to invest in a synthetic rubber company is replaced with Lake convincing him to invest in a real estate development.
- Lake was changed from Gervase's agent to an architect who has been swindled by his business partners, and a dramatic scene was added of him blowing up the evidence of the fraud and nearly dying in the attempt.
- Hugo Trent, who has no occupation in the story, was made into a designer of modern furniture, and needs money from his uncle to manufacture his designs.
- Instead of immediately confessing when Ruth is accused, Miss Lindgard tries posing as Vanda's spirit guide and attempts to trick her into confessing to the murder and then committing suicide. She is stopped by Poirot, Japp, and Hastings, and the detail about her having a terminal illness is removed.
- Whereas the short story ends with Ruth not knowing about her true parentage, the adaptation has her tell Poirot quite frankly that she knows who her father was and that she was illegitimate.

=== Triangle at Rhodes ===
Triangle at Rhodes was filmed for television in 1989 with David Suchet as Poirot, and first broadcast on 12 February that year as the sixth episode of series one.

Adaptor: Stephen Wakelam
Director: Renny Rye

Cast:
Yannis Hatziyannis as the Purser
Tilemanos Emanuel as a Customs Officer
Jon Cartwright as Commander Chantry
Dimitri Andreas as the Greek cashier
Anthony Benson as Stelton
Georgia Dervis as a Greek Girl
Angela Down as Marjorie Gold
Al Fiorentini as the police inspector
Stephen Gressieux as an Italian policeman
Timothy Kightley as Major Barnes
Annie Lambert as Valentine Chantry
George Little as Dicker
Frances Low as Pamela Lyle
Patrick Monckton as the hotel manager
Peter Settelen as Douglas Gold

The adaptation is faithful to the original story, and the only change is adding an attempt by Rhodes police to keep Poirot on the island when he finished his vacation and went back home because they thought he was a spy which is why he was not present at the hotel when Valentine Chantry was killed so he could not see Tony Chantry put a bottle of poison in Gold's pocket.

== Publication history ==
- 1937, Collins Crime Club (London), 15 March 1937, Hardback, 288 pp
- 1937, Dodd Mead and Company (New York), June 1937, Hardback, 290 pp
- 1954, Pan Books, Paperback, (Pan number 303)
- 1958, Fontana Books (Imprint of HarperCollins), Paperback, 190 pp
- 1958, Dell Books, Paperback, (Dell number D238), 190 pp
- 1961, Penguin Books, Paperback, (Penguin number 1637), 221 pp
- 1978, Dell Books, Paperback, (Dell number 11699); ISBN 0-440-11699-6, 192 pp
- 1986, Ulverscroft Large-print Edition, Hardcover; ISBN 0-7089-1443-8
- 2006, Poirot Facsimile Edition (of 1936 UK 1st ed), HarperCollins, 6 November 2006, hardback; ISBN 0-00-723448-1

The dustjacket design of the UK first edition was one of four commissioned by Collins from Robin Macartney, a friend of Christie and her husband Max Mallowan (the others being Murder in Mesopotamia, Death on the Nile and Appointment with Death). As well as being a talented artist, Macartney was an archaeologist and accompanied the Mallowans on many of their expeditions at this time and his shy personality was later recounted by Christie in her 1946 short volume of autobiography Come, Tell Me How You Live.

=== First publication of stories ===
All four of the stories in the collection were either previously published in magazines and were reprinted or were expanded versions of far shorter stories which had previously been published under different titles. Each of the stories are of novella length.

- "Dead Man's Mirror" was an expanded version of the story "The Second Gong" which appeared in issue 499 of the Strand Magazine in July 1932. The original shorter version was eventually reprinted in book form in the 1991 collection Problem at Pollensa Bay. The story is a locked room mystery featuring a wealthy retired man who apparently commits suicide. The character of Mr Satterthwaite who had previously appeared in The Mysterious Mr Quin in 1930 and Three Act Tragedy in 1935 makes a reappearance.
- "Triangle at Rhodes" appeared in issue 545 of the Strand Magazine in May 1936 under the slightly longer title of "Poirot and the Triangle at Rhodes". This final story in the collection is the shortest of the four and takes Poirot on an island holiday during which a guest is murdered. The story has some similarities to the full-length 1941 Christie novel, Evil Under the Sun, which includes a complicated love-triangle relationship.
- "Murder in the Mews" appeared in Woman's Journal in December 1936 in a version with differing chapter divisions to those that eventually appeared in the book
- "The Incredible Theft" is an expanded version of the story "The Submarine Plans" which appeared in issue 1606 of The Sketch magazine on 7 November 1923 with all the character names changed and one character – Mrs Macatta – added to the text. The original shorter version was eventually reprinted in book form in Poirot's Early Cases. The expanded version in the book was serialised in six instalments in the Daily Express from Tuesday, 6 April to Monday, 12 April 1937 (no publication on Sunday, 11 April) with illustrations for each instalment by Steven Spurrier.

In the US the stories were first published as follows:

- "Triangle at Rhodes" appeared in the 2 February 1936 issue of the weekly newspaper supplement This Week magazine with illustrations by Stanley Parkhouse.
- "Murder in the Mews" appeared in Redbook magazine in two instalments from September (Volume 67, Number 5) to October 1936 (Volume 67, Number 6) with illustrations by John Fulton.

No US magazine publications of "The Incredible Theft" or "Dead Man's Mirror" prior to 1937 have been traced, but the original shorter versions of these stories as described above were first published as follows:

- "The Submarine Plans" appeared in the July 1925 (Volume 41, Number 3) issue of the Blue Book magazine with an uncredited illustration.
- "The Second Gong" appeared in the June 1932 (Volume XLIX, Number 6) issue of Ladies Home Journal with an illustration by R.J. Prohaska.
