= SS Caledonia (1904) =

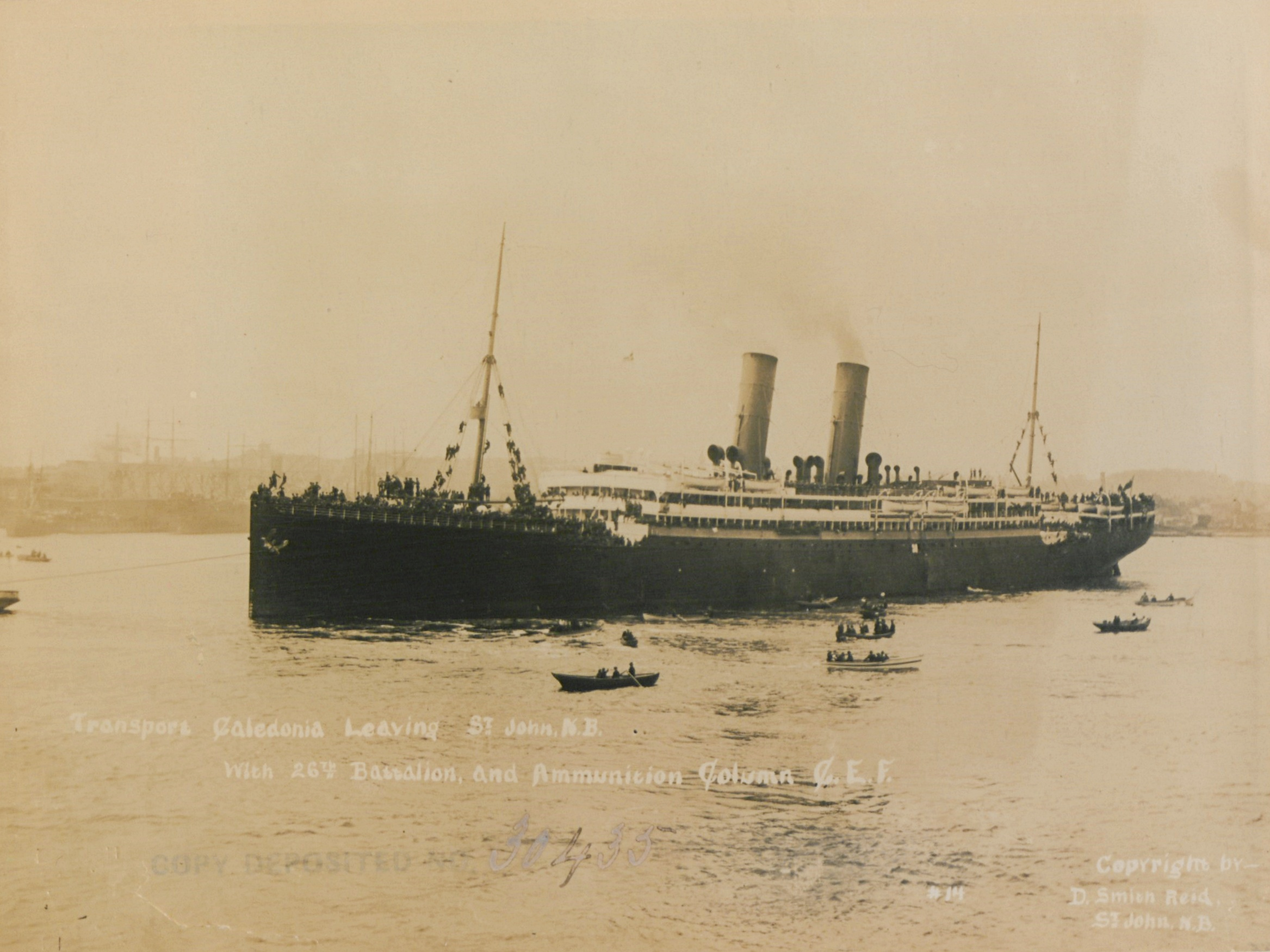
- Caledonia at Saint John, New Brunswick in 1915

History

United Kingdom
- Name: Caledonia
- Namesake: Caledonia
- Owner: Anchor Line
- Operator: 1905: Henderson Bros Ltd; 1914: (United Kingdom of Great Britain and Ireland) Royal Navy
- Port of registry: 1905: (United Kingdom of Great Britain and Ireland) Glasgow
- Ordered: 438
- Builder: D&W Henderson & Co, Glasgow
- Launched: 22 October 1904
- Completed: March 1905
- Maiden voyage: 26 March 1905
- Identification: UK official number 121218; code letters HCFD; call sign MAI
- Fate: Sunk by torpedo, 1916

General characteristics
- Type: Ocean liner
- Tonnage: 9,223 GRT, 5,066 NRT
- Length: 500.0 ft (152.4 m)
- Beam: 58.2 ft (17.7 m)
- Depth: 33.4 ft (10.2 m)
- Decks: 3
- Installed power: 1,060 NHP
- Propulsion: 2 × triple expansion engines; 2 × screws
- Speed: 16 knots (30 km/h)
- Capacity: Passengers: 250 × 1st class; 350 × 2nd class; 850 × 3rd class
- Troops: 3,074 men plus 212 horses
- Crew: 352

SS Caledonia was a British ocean liner that was built in Scotland in 1905 and converted into a troop ship in 1914. She was sunk by a German U-boat in the Mediterranean in 1916.

== Building and civilian service ==
D. and W. Henderson and Company in Glasgow built Caledonia as yard number 438 for the Anchor Line. She was launched on 22 October 1904 and completed in 1905. Her registered length was 500.0 ft (152.4 m), her beam was 58.2 ft (17.7 m) and her depth was 33.4 ft (10.2 m). She had berths for 1,350 passengers: 250 in first class, 350 in second class and 850 in third class. Her tonnages were 9,223 GRT and 5,066 NRT.

Caledonia had twin screws, each driven by a three-cylinder triple expansion engine. Between them her twin engines were rated at 1,060 NHP and gave her a speed of 16 knots (30 km/h).

Anchor Line registered Caledonia at Glasgow. Her United Kingdom official number was 121218 and her code letters were HCFD.

On 26 March 1905 Caledonia began her maiden voyage from Glasgow to New York. On 11 July 1914 she began her last civilian voyage on this route.

By 1913 Caledonia was equipped for wireless telegraphy. Her call sign is MAI.

== War service and loss ==
In August 1914 the Admiralty requisitioned Caledonia as a troop ship. In March 1915 she left Saint John, New Brunswick carrying members of the 26th Battalion, Canadian Expeditionary Force.

On the night of 31 July 1915 the 38th Battalion (Ottawa), CEF embarked on the Caledonia at Montreal. The transport proceeded down the Gulf of St. Lawrence, but was ordered back to Quebec City due to the suspected presence of submarines off the Atlantic coast. The battalion disembarked at Lévis, and two days later proceeded to Halifax by train. The ship sailed on to Halifax and picked up the 38th 7 August. They sailed on 8 August, landing in the Imperial fortress colony of Bermuda on 13 August to relieve the Royal Canadian Regiment, which had been posted to the Bermuda Garrison in place of the 2nd Battalion of the Lincolnshire Regiment in 1914.

On 4 December 1916 U-65 torpedoed Caledonia in the Mediterranean about 125 miles east of Malta. During the engagement, Caledonia tried to ram U-65, causing slight damage to the submarine. Caledonia sank with the loss of one or two lives (sources differ).

U-65 captured three of Caledonia's survivors: her Master, Captain Blaikie, Major-General HSL Ravenshaw, commander of the British Army's 27th Division, and his adjutant, Captain Vickermann. The German government threatened to put Captain Blaikie on trial as a franc-tireur, and execute him, as it had done to another British merchant captain, Charles Fryatt, that July. Britain responded by threatening to execute a German officer of similar rank if Captain Blaikie were executed. Germany relented, and transferred Blaikie to a prisoner of war camp.

== See also ==
- RMS Caledonia (1925)

== Bibliography ==
- Bonsor, NRP (1975). North Atlantic Seaway. Vol. I. Newton Abbot: David & Charles. p. 466. ISBN 978-0715364017.
- Haws, Duncan (1986). Anchor Line. Merchant Fleets. Vol. 9. Burwash: Travel Creatours Ltd Publications. ISBN 978-0946378050.
- Lloyd's Register of Shipping. Vol. I–Steamers. London: Lloyd's Register of Shipping. 1914.
- The Marconi Press Agency Ltd (1913). The Year Book of Wireless Telegraphy and Telephony. London: The St Katherine Press.
- Mercantile Navy List. London. 1906.
