= Digby Shuttleworth =

British general

Major-General Sir Digby Shuttleworth KCIE CB CBE DSO
- Born: 23 August 1876; Pune, British India
- Died: 15 May 1948 (aged 71); Halstead, Essex, England
- Military career
- Allegiance: United Kingdom
- Branch: British Indian Army
- Service years: 1898–1936
- Rank: Major-General
- Units: 3rd Gurkha Rifles, 39th Infantry Brigade, 83rd Infantry Brigade
- Conflicts: First World War
- Awards: KCIE, CB, CBE, DSO

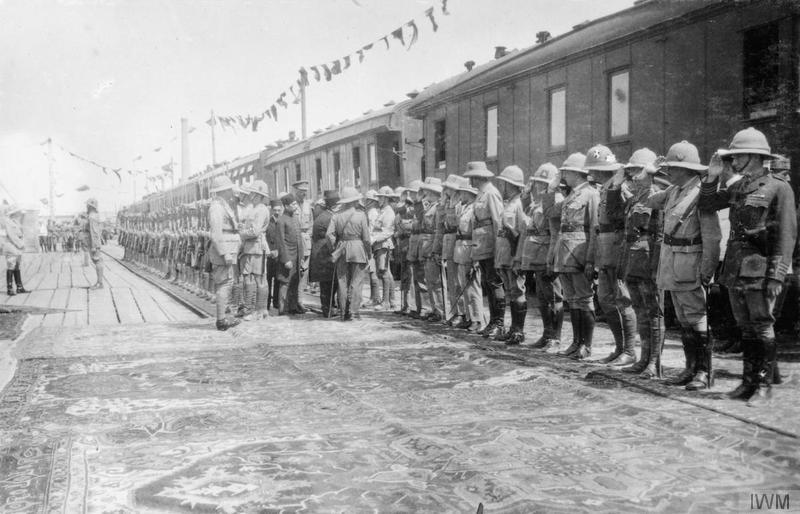
Brigadier General Digby Inglis Shuttleworth and the Shah of Persia, Ahmad Shāh Qājār, review the British Guard of Honour drawn up alongside his train on his arrival at Baku, August 1919

Major-General Sir Digby Inglis Shuttleworth KCIE CB CBE DSO (23 August 1876 – 15 May 1948) was a senior British Indian Army officer.

== Military career ==
Born on 23 August 1876, Digby Shuttleworth was educated at Bedford School, and joined the 3rd Gurkha Rifles in 1898. He served in India between 1912 and 1916, in Mesopotamia and Iran, and commanded the 39th Infantry Brigade in the Caucasus, as well as the 83rd Infantry Brigade, Army of the Black Sea, between 1917 and 1919. He was President of the Allied Commission of Control, Ottoman War Office, in 1920, and Commander of the 83rd Infantry Brigade during the Chanak Crisis, between 1920 and 1923. He was promoted to the rank of major general in 1929, was Deputy Adjutant and Quartermaster General, Northern Command, India, between 1930 and 1932, and Commander, Kohat District, between 1932 and 1936.

Major General Sir Digby Shutleworth became a Commander of the Order of the British Empire in 1919, a Companion of the Order of the Bath in 1925, and a Knight Commander of the Order of the Indian Empire in 1937. He retired from the British Indian Army in 1936 and died on 15 May 1948. He had been promoted to major general on 18 February 1929.

His older brother was A. R. B. Shuttleworth.
