= 83rd Brigade (United Kingdom) =

British Military Unit

The 83rd Brigade was an infantry brigade formation of the British Army. It was originally formed from regular army battalions serving away from home in the British Empire. It was assigned to the 28th Division and served on the Western Front and the Macedonian Front during World War I. The Brigade was temporarily attached to the 5th Division between March and April 1915.

== Formation ==
The infantry battalions did not all serve at once, but all were assigned to the brigade during the war.

- 2nd Battalion, King's Own Royal Regiment (Lancaster)
- 2nd Battalion, East Yorkshire Regiment
- 1st Battalion, King's Own Yorkshire Light Infantry
- 1st Battalion, York and Lancaster Regiment
- 1/5th Battalion, King's Own Royal Regiment (Lancaster)
- 1/3rd Battalion, Monmouthshire Regiment
- 83rd Machine Gun Company, Machine Gun Corps
- 83rd Trench Mortar Battery
- 83rd SAA Section Ammunition Column

== Commanders ==
Commanding officers
Rank	Name	Date appointed	Notes
Brigadier-General	R. C. Boyle	26 December 1914	Sick 13 May 1915
Lieutenant-Colonel	T. O. Marden	13 May 1915	Acting
Brigadier-General	H. S. L. Ravenshaw	19 May 1915	
Lieutenant-Colonel	W. A. Blake	18 May 1916	Acting
Brigadier-General	H. S. L. Ravenshaw	21 May 1916	
Lieutenant-Colonel	G. E. Bayley	14 September 1916	Acting
Brigadier-General	F. S. Montague-Bates	25 September 1916	
Brigadier-General	R. H. Hare	13 November 1916	
Brigadier-General	F. C. Nisbet	10 March 1919	
Lieutenant-Colonel	W. Miller	1 April 1919	Acting
Lieutenant-Colonel	R. C. Dobbs	23 May 1919	Acting
Brigadier-General	F. C. Nisbet	27 May 1919	
Lieutenant-Colonel	R. Tyrer	21 September 1919	Acting
Brigadier-General	F. S. Montague-Bates	26 September 1919	
Brigadier-General	D. I. Shuttleworth	26 February 1920	
