= Hurdis Ravenshaw =

Major-General Hurdis Ravenshaw CMG
- Ravenshaw c.1920
- Born: June 1869
- Died: 6 June 1920 (aged 50); Port Elizabeth, South Africa
- Military career
- Allegiance: United Kingdom
- Branch: British Army
- Service years: 1888–1920
- Rank: Major-General
- Units: East Yorkshire Regiment; Devonshire Regiment; Connaught Rangers
- Commands: 83rd Infantry Brigade; 27th Division
- Conflicts: Chitral expedition Malakand; Tirah campaign Second Boer War; First World War
- Awards: Companion of the Order of St Michael and St George

Major-General Hurdis Secundus Lalande Ravenshaw CMG (June 1869 – c. 6 June 1920) was a senior British Army officer in the First World War who served at the Royal Military College, Sandhurst and saw action on the North-West Frontier of India, in South Africa in the Second Boer War, and in France and Greece in the First World War. In 1916 a German U-boat captured him, and he was a prisoner of war for the next two years. He died in 1920 in unusual circumstances after becoming lost in the South African bush near Port Elizabeth and succumbing to the elements.

== Early life ==
Hurdis Ravenshaw was born in June 1869 to John Hurdis Ravenshaw and his second wife, Harriet Lalande Biggs. His elder half-brother was Thomas Edward Ravenshaw.

== Early military career ==
He was educated at Haileybury and Imperial Service College and from there joined the part-time Militia on 2 April 1887 as a second lieutenant in the 3rd (Bedfordshire Militia) Battalion, Bedfordshire Regiment; he was promoted to lieutenant on 27 June 1888. He used this position to gain a Regular Army commission in the East Yorkshire Regiment in December 1888.

Seeking action, in August 1890 he transferred to the Devonshire Regiment who were sent to India and went on campaign in 1895 as part of the Chitral Relief Force which overthrew the Mehtar of Chitral and replaced him with the pro-British Shuja ul-Mulk the younger son of the former ruler, Aman ul-Mulk. In 1897 and 1898 Ravenshaw, who in March 1897 was promoted to captain, was again active, conducting operations against Malakand and then participating in the Tirah campaign where he was with the army which forced the Khyber Pass against the Afridis. He was appointed adjutant of the 1st battalion of his regiment in December 1898, serving until December 1902.

In these years he was transferred with his regiment to South Africa to fight against the Boers at the outbreak of the Second Boer War in late 1899. He fought in the relief of Ladysmith and numerous smaller actions for three years. After his return home in 1902, Ravenshaw was in early 1903 given the position of adjutant at the Royal Military College, Sandhurst, a post he held until 1907. He was made a major in March 1907.

In March 1910 he was made a deputy assistant adjutant and quartermaster general. On 16 July 1914 he was transferred from the Devonshire Regiment to the Connaught Rangers and was promoted to lieutenant colonel to assume command of the 1st Battalion, Connaught Rangers.

== First World War ==
The First World War began soon after. He brought the battalion, which formed part of the 7th Ferozepore Brigade, 3rd (Lahore) Division, of the Indian Army, overseas for service on the Western Front in late September.

Ravenshaw remained in command of the battalion until April 1915, when he was made a staff officer at 1st Division headquarters before being promoted to the temporary rank of brigadier general in May 1915 and given command of the 28th Division's 83rd Infantry Brigade.

This unit saw action in France during 1915 before being sent to the Macedonian front in Greece towards the end of the year where it formed part of the British Salonika Force (later the British Salonika Army).There, with his brigade, he served against the Bulgarian Army, rising to command the 27th Division, which was also serving in Macedonia as part of the BSA, in September 1916. While there he was promoted to brevet colonel in January.

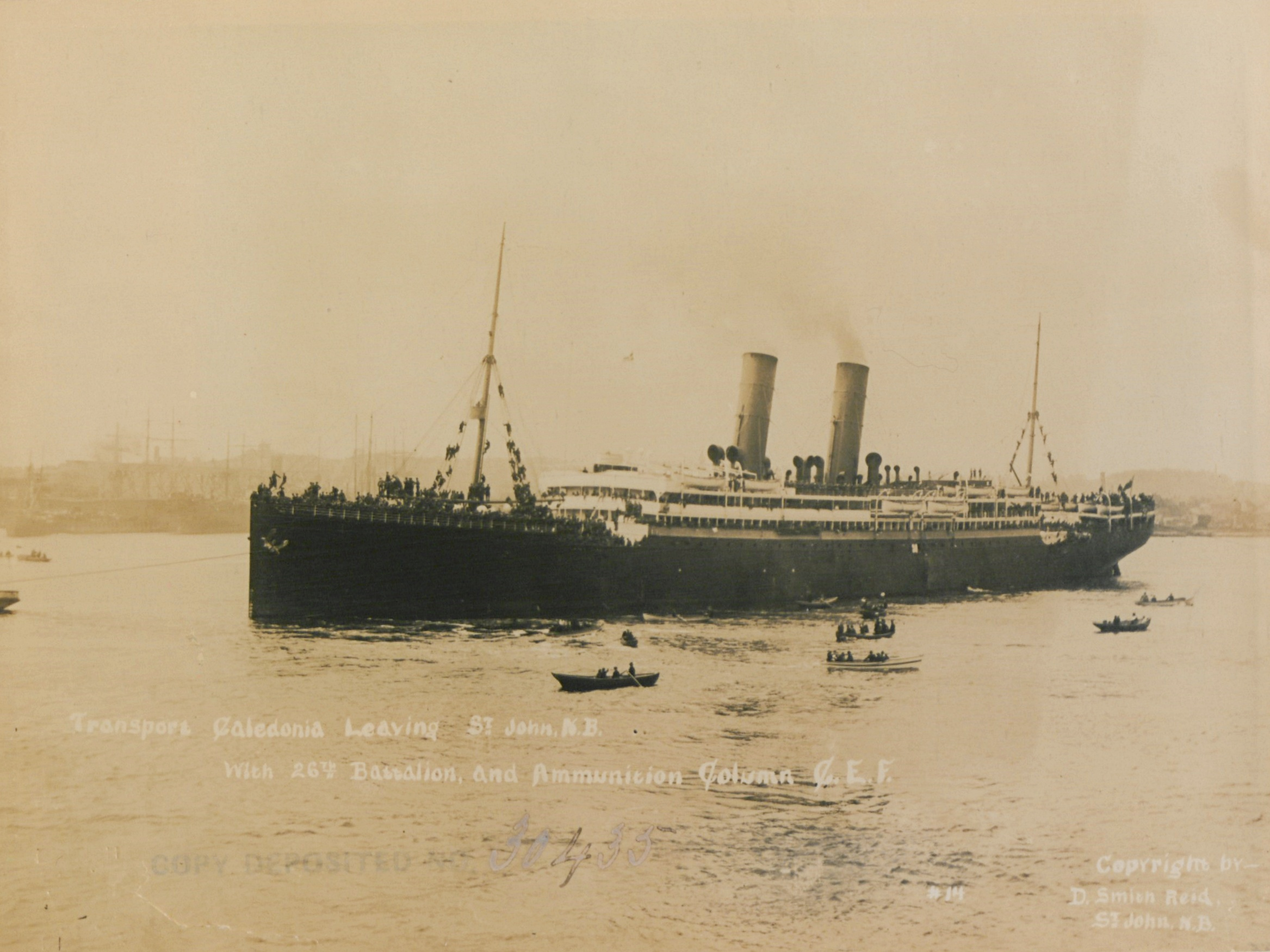
The troop ship Caledonia

In December 1916, Ravenshaw sailed on the troop ship Caledonia to meet his superiors in England. On 4 December, U-65 sank Caledonia in the Mediterranean, and captured both Ravenshaw and his adjutant Captain FHD Vickerman. They were taken to Austria-Hungary, where they were prisoners of war for the next two years.

Released after the armistice, Ravenshaw, who had previously relinquished his temporary rank of major general, backdated to November 1916, was appointed commander of the troops in South Africa.

== Death ==
In 1920 he travelled to Port Elizabeth in South Africa and on 6 June was seen entering Addo Bush near the city but failed to return. A search party discovered his body two days later.
