= Catherine Macartney =

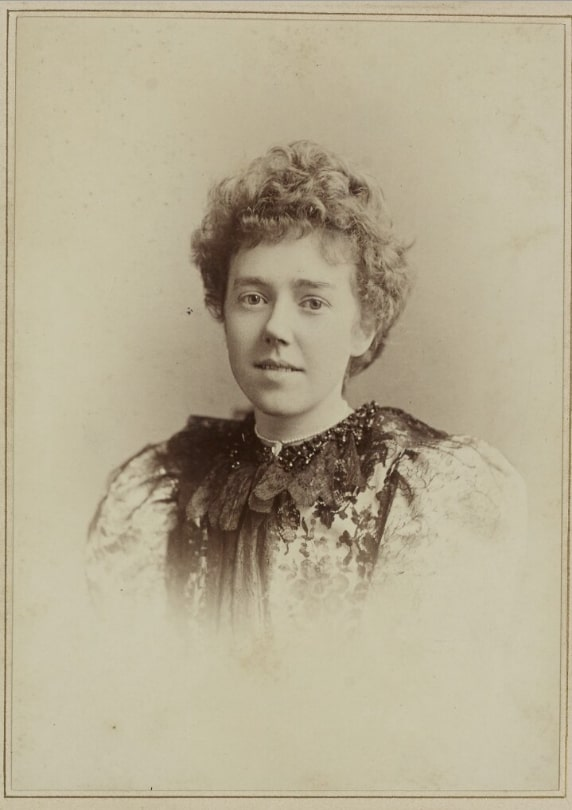
Catherine Macartney, aged 22

Catherine Theodora, Lady Macartney (20 February 1876 - 13 January 1951). Catherine (née Borland) was born in Bexleyheath, Kent, England. She was the second daughter of James Borland, born 1836 in Castle Douglas, Scotland. In 1898, she married Sir George Macartney, the British Consul in Kashgar. Catherine's father had studied in Scotland with George Macartney's father, Halliday Macartney.

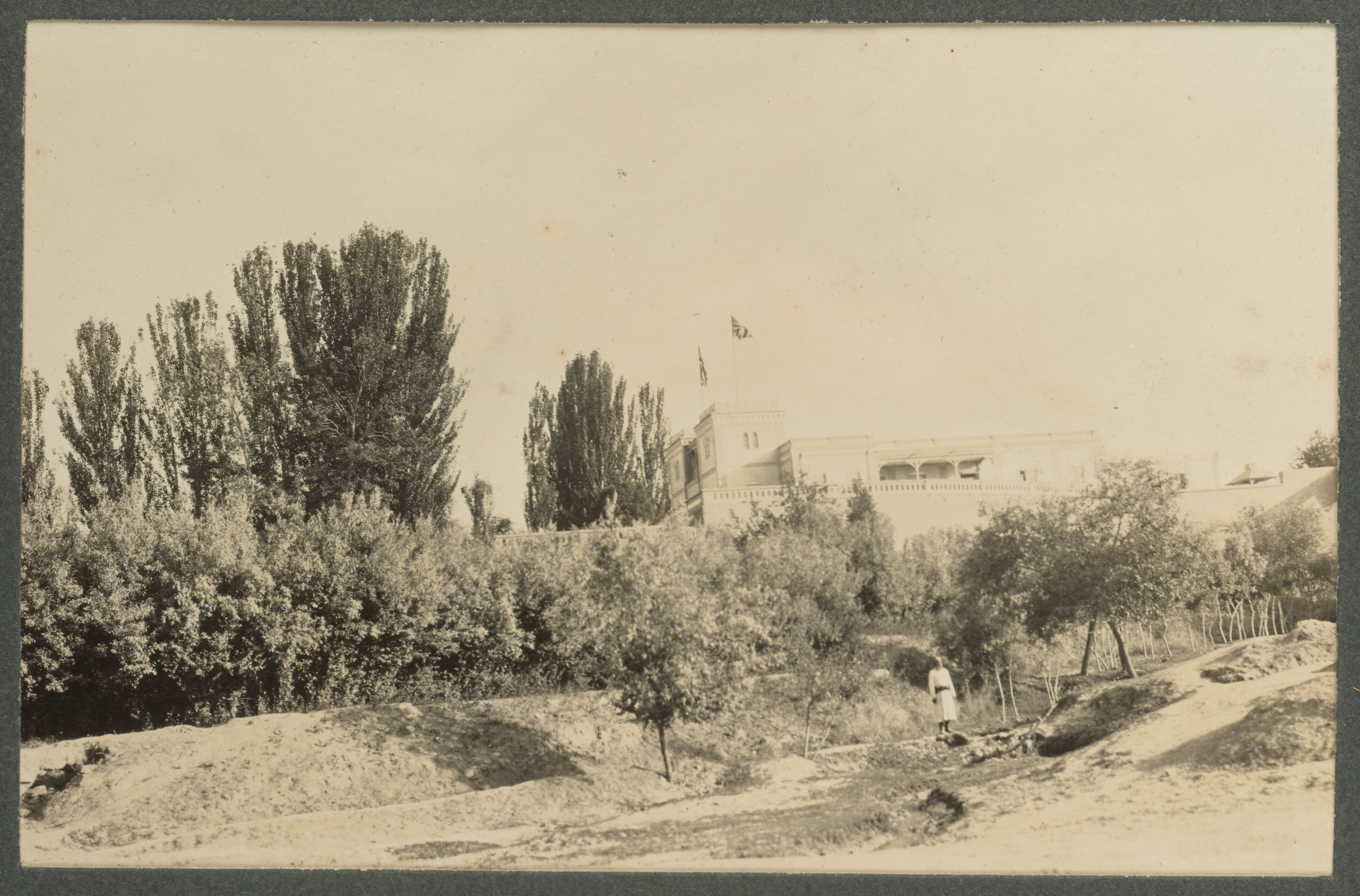
The British Consulate-General in Kashgar in 1915

== Travel to Tashkent ==
In 1915, Percy Sykes and Ella Sykes journeyed to Tashkent to relieve them. The journey took them over a month. While they were there, they travelled further. Ella was the first British woman to pass through the "Katta Dawan" pass that was 13,000 feet high. Their journey home also took a month, and these journeys were recorded in photographs.

Catherine published her memoirs detailing her time in Kashgar in 1931. She helped the archaeologists who discovered the Dunhuang manuscripts.

== Children ==
The Macartneys had three children: Eric Borland Macartney (1903–1994), Sylvia Theodora Macartney (1906–1950), and Robin Halliday Macartney (1911–1973). Eric was born in England shortly before the Macartneys returned to Kashgar. Lady Macartney travelled with her newborn child through Central Asia to Kashgar, accompanied by a nurse.

== Death ==
Lady Macartney died in Charminster, Dorset, England in 1951, two weeks after her daughter. She is buried with her husband and her two younger children in St. Saviour's churchyard on the Isle of Jersey.
