= Sierra Leone Studies =

- Language: English
- Edited by: John Birchall

Standard abbreviations
- ISO 4: Sierra Leone Stud.

Sierra Leone Studies is an academic journal about Sierra Leone. There have been several journals of this title since the initial publication was launched in 1918.

== First series ==
Between 1918 and 1939 22 issues were published. The journal was subject to crown copyright. In 1930 the editor-in-chief was D. B. Drummond.

== Second series ==
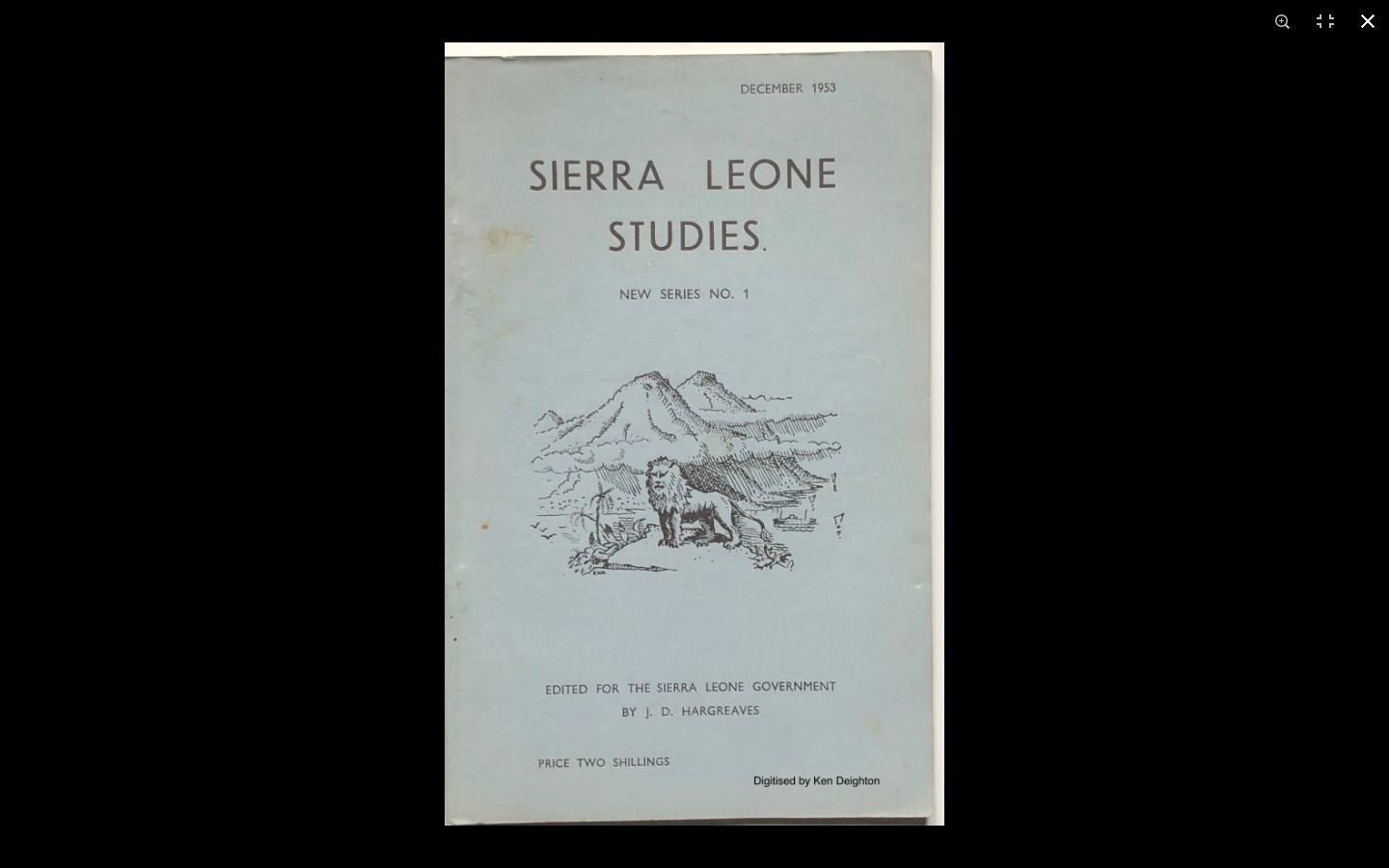
Sierra Leone Studies

In 1944 the British Colonial Research Committee established the Colonial Social Science Research Council. In order to provide for the systematic collection and analysis of data concerning the colonies, British academics were sponsored to carry out research in the colonies. In 1953 the council provided £660 to publish two issues a year of a second series. This ran until 1970 during which time 26 issues were published.

== Current ==
John Birchall established a journal with the same name in 2012.
