= Eizaburo Nomura =

Japanese explorer

Eizaburo Nomura (野村 栄三郎, Nomura Eizaburō) was a Japanese explorer of Central Asia. He made two trips to Central Asia between 1902 and 1910, all financed by Count Ōtani. Although he travelled as a secretary of Otani's Buddhist temple in Kyoto, he was suspected, correctly, by British and Russian Intelligence of being in the Imperial Japanese Army.
