= Zuicho Tachibana =

Japanese explorer

- 橘 瑞超
- Born: January 7, 1890; Nagoya, Japan
- Died: November 4, 1968 (aged 78); Nagoya, Japan
- Occupations: Buddhist, Explorer of Central Asia

Zuicho Tachibana (橘 瑞超, Tachibana Zuichō; January 7, 1890 - November 4, 1968) was a Japanese explorer of Central Asia.

== Biography ==
He made three trips to Central Asia between 1902 and 1910, all financed by Count Otani. Although he travelled as a priest of the Jōdo Shinshū sect, he was suspected by British and Russian Intelligence of being an officer of the Imperial Japanese Navy.

Tachibana was instrumental in delivery of the part of Dunhuang manuscripts to Japan in 1912.

== See also ==
- 1902 Ōtani expedition
