= Murder in Mesopotamia =

1936 mystery novel by Agatha Christie

- Dust-jacket illustration of the first UK edition
- Author: Agatha Christie
- Cover artist: Robin Macartney
- Language: English
- Series: Hercule Poirot
- Genre: Crime novel
- Publisher: Collins Crime Club
- Publication date: 6 July 1936
- Publication place: United Kingdom
- Media type: Print (hardback & paperback)
- Pages: 288
- Preceded by: The A.B.C. Murders
- Followed by: Cards on the Table

Murder in Mesopotamia is a mystery novel by British writer Agatha Christie, first published in the UK by the Collins Crime Club on 6 July 1936 and in the US by Dodd, Mead and Company later in the same year. The UK edition retailed at seven shillings and sixpence (7/6) and the US edition at $2.00. The cover was designed by Robin Macartney.

The book features Belgian detective Hercule Poirot. The novel is set at an archaeological excavation in Iraq, and descriptive details derive from the author's visit to the Royal Cemetery at Ur where she met her husband, Sir Max Mallowan, and other British archaeologists. It was adapted for television in 2002.

== Synopsis ==
Nurse Amy Leatheran arrives at an archaeological dig near Hassanieh, Iraq, to assist the Swedish-American archaeologist, Dr Eric Leidner, in caring for his seemingly-neurotic wife, Louise. During her initial days, Amy learns that Louise was married before to a German named Frederick Bosner. Fifteen years ago, during the Great War, Bosner was arrested for being a spy within the US State Department, and sentenced to death; he escaped custody, but died later in a train crash. Louise reveals that she received death threats claiming to be from Frederick whenever she was attracted to another man. Three years ago she met Leidner, but no letter came. She married him, but soon after their marriage she received a letter, which was followed by a possible attempt on their lives by gas poisoning. Since then she has accompanied her husband on his archaeological digs, has not returned to America, and has received no new letters - until recently; these are the cause of her fears. A week later, after receiving another threatening letter, Louise is found dead in her bedroom in the archaeologists' compound near the dig site. Dr Giles Reilly determines she was struck by a very heavy, blunt object.

An initial investigation, led by Captain Maitland, cannot find the murder weapon, but confirms someone on the dig must have committed the murder. Reilly learns that Hercule Poirot is travelling in Iraq, and so contacts him for help. When Poirot arrives, he notes that the bedroom has only one point of entry, that the only window in the room was shut and barred, and that a rug near a washstand has blood on it. Anne Johnson, a colleague of Leidner, claims she heard a cry, yet is unsure about it. Reilly's daughter Sheila remarks that the victim had the attention of every man, especially one of Leidner's old friends Richard Carey. Poirot takes an interest in the story Louise told Nurse Leatheran about her first husband; he wonders if Bosner, or possibly his much-younger brother William (presumably still living but whereabouts unknown) is somehow among the team. Two men – epigraphist Father Lavigny and drug-addicted historian Joseph Mercado – are the right age to be Frederick. Furthermore, three younger men – dig assistants Bill Coleman and David Emmott, and photographer Carl Reiter – are the right age to be William. Reiter in particular is of German-American ancestry, and was tormented by Louise for his shyness and clumsiness. However, he seems to have an alibi. Poirot is also intrigued to find that the letters Louise received were apparently in her own handwriting.

Following Louise's funeral, Nurse Leatheran meets with Miss Johnson on the compound's roof. Johnson claims she knows how someone could have entered unseen, but does not elaborate further. That night, Miss Johnson unwittingly drinks a glass of hydrochloric acid which had been substituted for her usual glass of water on her nightstand. Amy attends to Miss Johnson, and hears her mention "the window" before she dies. The nurse does not believe Miss Johnson has committed suicide, and wonders if she hinted at how the acid was switched for the water. After spending a day sending telegrams, Poirot brings everyone together and reveals that both women were murdered by Dr Eric Leidner, who is, in reality, Frederick Bosner. The real Leidner died in the train crash 15 years ago – when Bosner came across his body and found his face disfigured, he switched their identities to escape the authorities.

Bosner was deeply possessive of Louise. To discourage her from forming relationships with other men, he sent her letters, which he carefully wrote out in her handwriting so the police would disbelieve her. The letters stopped after he married her twelve years later, when she no longer recognised him. When Louise became attracted to Richard Carey, Bosner decided to murder her to ensure no one else could have her. On the day of the murder, Bosner, on the rooftop, lured her to the window with a mask he had used to scare her on previous nights. Once she stuck her head out to investigate, he dropped a quern on her, which he then pulled back to the roof via a rope he had tied to it. On the pretence of checking on her, he shut the bedroom window while moving the body and the rug beneath it to where they were later found. He then used Amy as part of his alibi to divert suspicion from himself. Miss Johnson was murdered because she had begun to realise how Louise was killed.

In the aftermath of Poirot's investigations, it is revealed that Father Lavigny is actually Raoul Menier, a dealer in stolen artifacts. As Lavigny was known to Leidner only by reputation, Menier was able to impersonate him while stealing artifacts found at the dig and replacing them with excellent copies. Thanks to warnings sent out by Poirot, Menier and his associate Ali Yusuf are arrested in Beirut. Sheila marries David Emmott, and Nurse Leatheran returns home to England.

== Characters ==
- Hercule Poirot – Renowned Belgian detective. Involved in the case, while on a trip to the Middle East.
- Amy Leatheran – A professional nurse, attending the dig of Eric Leidner to care for his wife Louise. She is the narrator of the story.
- Captain Maitland – British policeman in charge of the murder investigation.
- Louise Leidner – First victim of the case. A beautiful, intelligent American woman, and wife of Dr Eric Leidner for two years. Widowed from a brief marriage in the Great War, 15 years earlier.
- Anne Johnson – A longtime colleague of Dr Leidner from Yorkshire. Second victim of the case.
- Dr Eric Leidner – Louise's husband, and an archaeologist of some repute. Head of the dig at Tell Yarimjah near Hassanieh for five years, sponsored by the University of Pittstown (a fictional university in the United States).
- Richard Carey – A handsome man, and longtime colleague of Dr Leidner. Alleged to be having an affair with Louise.
- Dr Giles Reilly – Civil doctor in Hassanieh. Responsible for Amy's position at the dig and Poirot's involvement in investigating Louise's murder.
- Sheila Reilly – Outspoken daughter of Dr Reilly.
- Joseph Mercado – Archaeological colleague of Leidner, having assisted on his dig for the past two years. Noted for being often fatigued and subject to violent shaking of the hands.
- Marie Mercado – Young devoted wife of Joseph. Noted for being at times strangely hostile to Mrs Leidner, Nurse Leatheran and Hercule Poirot.
- David Emmott – Quiet young American man, and worker on the dig. He is currently on his second year with the dig team, and is calm and self-possessed.
- Bill Coleman – Young man working on the dig. Despite this being his first dig, has no particular interest in archaeology and a self-professed skill for forgery.
- Carl Reiter – A young American from Chicago. Spending his first year on the dig as a photographer, and noted for being frequently subjected to ridicule by Mrs Leidner.
- Father Lavigny (Raoul Menier) – French cleric, new to the team. A specialist in epigraphy, old languages.
- Abdullah – A servant that seems to be gossiping out at the courtyard during the time of the murder.

== Literary significance and reception ==
The Times Literary Supplement of 18 July 1936, summarised in its review by Harry Pirie-Gordon the setup of the plot and concluded, "The plot is ingenious and the first murder very cleverly contrived but some will doubt whether Mrs Leidner, as described, could have been so forgetful and unobservant as to render the principal preliminary conditions of the story possible."

In The New York Times Book Review (20 September 1936), Kay Irvin wrote: "Agatha Christie is a past master, as every one knows, in presenting us with a full assortment of clues which we cannot read. And there are mysteries within mysteries among this quiet yet oddly troubled group of scientific workers, one of whom must have been the murderer; it is part of the author's skill to make us feel that every human character is a little mysterious, and that when crimes are committed among a group of apparently well-bred and cultivated people every one of them may be suspect. Agatha Christie's expertness in building up her detective stories, as such, to astonishing (though sometimes very far-fetched) conclusions has more or less over-shadowed her amazing versatility, not only in background and incident, but in character-drawing and actual style. The story here is told by a trained nurse – as has been done by other eminent mystery novelists. Nurse Leatheran holds her own with them all. This latest Christie opus is a smooth, highly original and completely absorbing tale".

In The Observer 12 July 1936 issue, "Torquemada" (Edward Powys Mathers) wrote that "Agatha Christie tells a humorous, well-observed story amongst the ruins of Tell Yarimjah, and her latest method of murder, which got me guessing and guessing fruitlessly, has, as usual, more the simplicity of a miracle than the complication of a conjuring trick. Poirot as a man is quite as delightful as ever, and Poirot as a detective not only perplexes the pleasant and not too intelligent hospital nurse, whose duty it is to tell the story, but, again as usual, the intelligent reader as well. The trouble is that he also perplexes the unprejudiced in a way most unusual to him: I for one cannot understand why he has allowed Agatha Christie to make him party to a crime whose integrity stands or falls by a central situation which, though most ingenious, is next door to impossible. The point at issue, which it would be grossly unfair to specify, between Mrs Christie and the reader is one which would provide a really interesting silly season correspondence." He concluded that "usually Poirot is to be toasted in anything handy, and no heel-taps; this time I drink to him a rather sorrowful glass of Lachryma Christie."

The Daily Mirror (9 July 1936) wrote: "Don't start reading this if you've got something to do or want a book just for a quarter of an hour or so. Because you simply won't put it down til you've reached the last sentence." The review finished by saying, "Agatha Christie's grand. In this tale of peculiarly placed murder she's given us another rattling good tale."

Robert Barnard remarked that an "Archaeological dig provides unusual setting, expertly and entertainingly presented. Wife-victim surely based on Katherine Woolley, and very well done. Narrated by nurse, a temporary Hastings-substitute—soon she found she could do without such a figure altogether." Barnard was pleased with the main character and that Christie did not use Hastings in the novel, but in summary felt that the novel was "Marred by an ending which goes beyond the improbable to the inconceivable."

== References or Allusions ==
Christie reportedly based the character of Louise Leidner on Katharine Woolley, the wife of archaeologist Sir Leonard Woolley. Christie's husband Max Mallowan had worked on Woolley's excavation at Ur.

=== References to other works ===
- Although this novel was published in 1936, the events described are stated to have taken place three years earlier. It is when he returns from Mesopotamia that Poirot travels on the Orient Express and solves the murder that takes place aboard it.
- In Chapter XII, Dr Leidner recalls hearing a "Mr Van Aldin" speak highly of Poirot. Rufus Van Aldin was a prominent character in Christie's earlier work The Mystery of the Blue Train.
- In one chapter Nurse Leatheran is said to have spent the afternoon reading the detective novel The Nursing Home Murder, which is the name of a well-known novel by Ngaio Marsh, but the ending of Nurse Leatheran's book differs from the ending of Marsh's.
- In Chapter 6 and 9, similarities are drawn between Louise Leidner and La Belle Dame sans Merci, a femme fatale figure from an 1819 ballad by John Keats.

== Adaptations ==
=== Television ===
Murder in Mesopotamia was adapted as an episode for the series Agatha Christie's Poirot on 2 June 2002. It starred David Suchet as Hercule Poirot, and was filmed on location at the Hotel Casino in Hammam Lif and on the Uthina Archaeological site, both in Tunisia. While it remained faithful to the main plot elements of the novel, including the murder, the motive, and the denouement, the adaptation made a number of changes:

- The characters of Dr Giles Reilly, Mr Reiter and David Emmott, are omitted.
- Sheila Reilly becomes Captain Maitland's daughter – her surname is changed as a result, while her character is more pleasant.
- The character of Captain Hastings is added – apart from being Poirot's assistant in the case, relegating Amy Leatheran to being another suspect in the case, he is also the uncle of William Coleman, whom he is visiting.
- Poirot is in Iraq mainly to meet with Countess Vera Rossakoff, after receiving a telegram from her asking for his help; she has already left by the time he arrives, and he is only made aware of this via a telephone message he receives when the case is solved.
- Poirot visits the archaeological dig when he arrives, and so meets with Louise when she is alive – as a result, he learns about her first marriage and the letters she received from her directly, and not through Amy.
- Joseph Mercado's drug addiction is much stronger in tone – he murders his supplier before Poirot arrives to see the dig site, and later commits suicide out of guilt.
- Raoul Menier and Ali Yusuf are not identified when the theft of artefacts is exposed. Both men are also not arrested; Poirot mainly informs Captain Maitland to have the border posts keep a look out for them.

=== Radio ===
Michael Bakewell adapted Murder in Mesopotamia for BBC Radio 4, featuring John Moffatt as Poirot.

=== Graphic novel ===
Murder in Mesopotamia was released by HarperCollins as a graphic novel adaptation on 1 July 2008, adapted by François Rivière and illustrated by "Chandre" (ISBN 0-00-727530-7). This was translated from the edition first published in France by Emmanuel Proust éditions in 2005 under the title of Meurtre en Mésopotamie.

== Publication history ==
- 1936, Collins Crime Club (London), 6 July 1936, Hardcover, 288 pp
- 1936, Dodd Mead and Company (New York), Hardcover, 298 pp
- 1944, Dell Books (New York), Paperback, (Dell number 145 [mapback]), 223 pp
- 1952, Pan Books, Paperback, (Pan number 200)
- 1955, Penguin Books, Paperback, (Penguin number 1099), 219 pp
- 1962, Fontana Books (Imprint of HarperCollins), Paperback, 190 pp
- 1969, Ulverscroft Large-print Edition, Hardcover, 367 pp; ISBN 0-85456-667-8
- 2007, Poirot Facsimile Edition (Facsimile of 1936 UK First Edition), HarperCollins, 5 February 2007, Hardcover; ISBN 0-00-723444-9

The book was first serialised in the US in The Saturday Evening Post in six instalments from 9 November (Volume 208, Number 19) to 14 December 1935 (Volume 208, Number 24) with illustrations by F. R. Gruger.

In the UK, the novel was serialised as an abridged version in the weekly Women's Pictorial magazine in eight instalments from 8 February (Volume 31, Number 787) to 28 March 1936 (Volume 31, Number 794) under the title No Other Love. There were no chapter divisions and all of the instalments carried illustrations by Clive Uptton. Several character names were different from the eventual published novel: Amy Leatheran became Amy Seymour while Mr and Mrs Leidner were surnamed Trevor.

== Bibliography ==
- Curran, John (2011). Agatha Christie. Los cuadernos secretos (in Spanish). Penguin Random House Grupo Editorial España. p. 568. ISBN 9788483652633.
