= George Macartney (British consul) =

British diplomat (1867–1945)

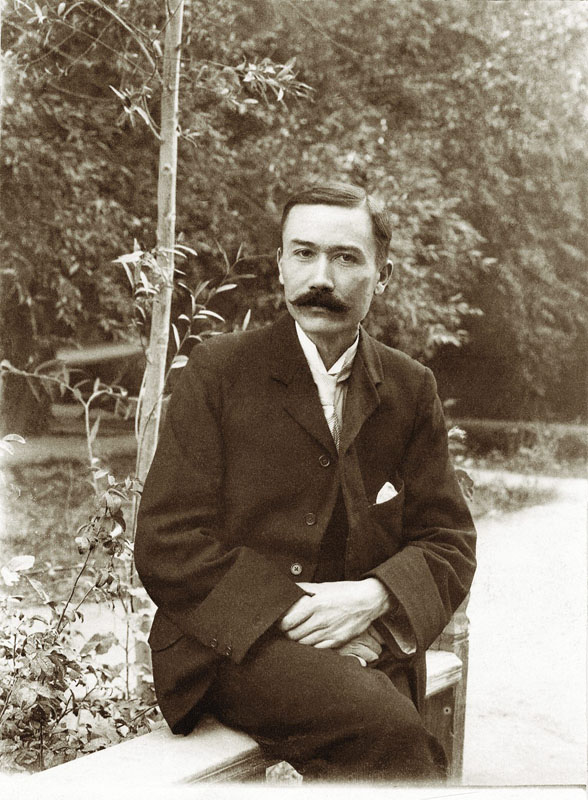
Sir George Macartney (1867–1945)

Sir George Macartney should not be confused with his kinsman George Macartney, an earlier British statesman.

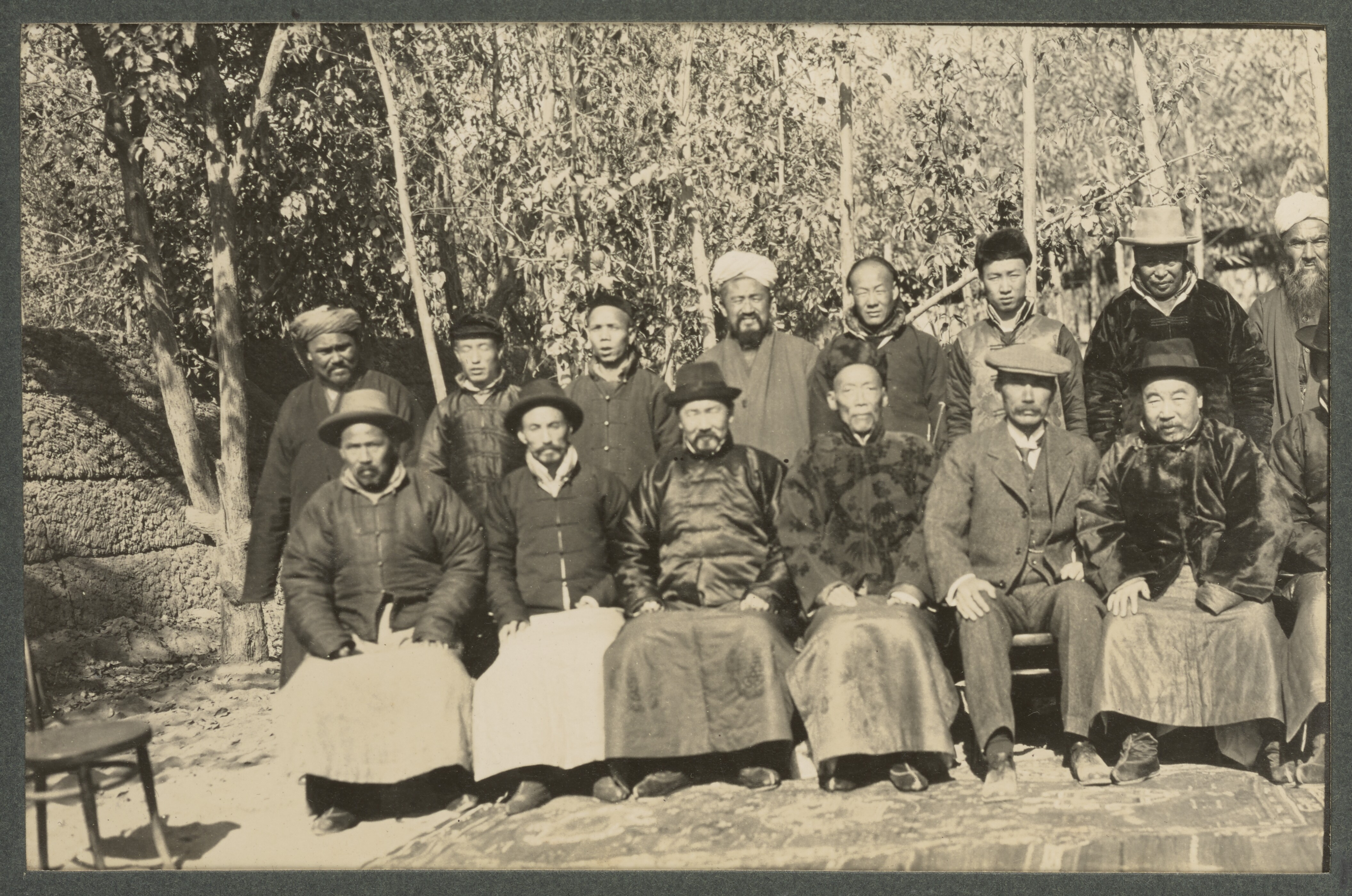
Sir George Macartney & Chinese Officials, Kashgar, 1915

Sir George Macartney KCIE (Chinese: 馬繼業; 19 January 1867 –19 May 1945) was the British consul-general in Kashgar at the end of the 19th century. He was succeeded by Percy T. Etherton. Macartney arrived in Xinjiang in 1890 as an interpreter for the Younghusband expedition. He remained there until 1918. Macartney first proposed the Macartney-MacDonald Line as the boundary between China and India in Aksai Chin.

Macartney was born in Nanjing and was half-Chinese while his godfather was Chinese politician Li Hongzhang. His father, Halliday Macartney, was a member of the same family as George Macartney, the 18th century British ambassador to China, and his mother was a near relative of Lar Wang, one of the leaders of the Taiping rebellion.

Macartney married Catherine Borland in 1898. In Kashgar his wife, Catherine, Lady Macartney, assisted the archaeologists who found the library at Dunhuang. The Macartneys had three children.

The Macartneys retired to Jersey in the Channel Islands, where they were trapped by the German occupation during World War II. Macartney died on Jersey, just a few days after the German surrender.

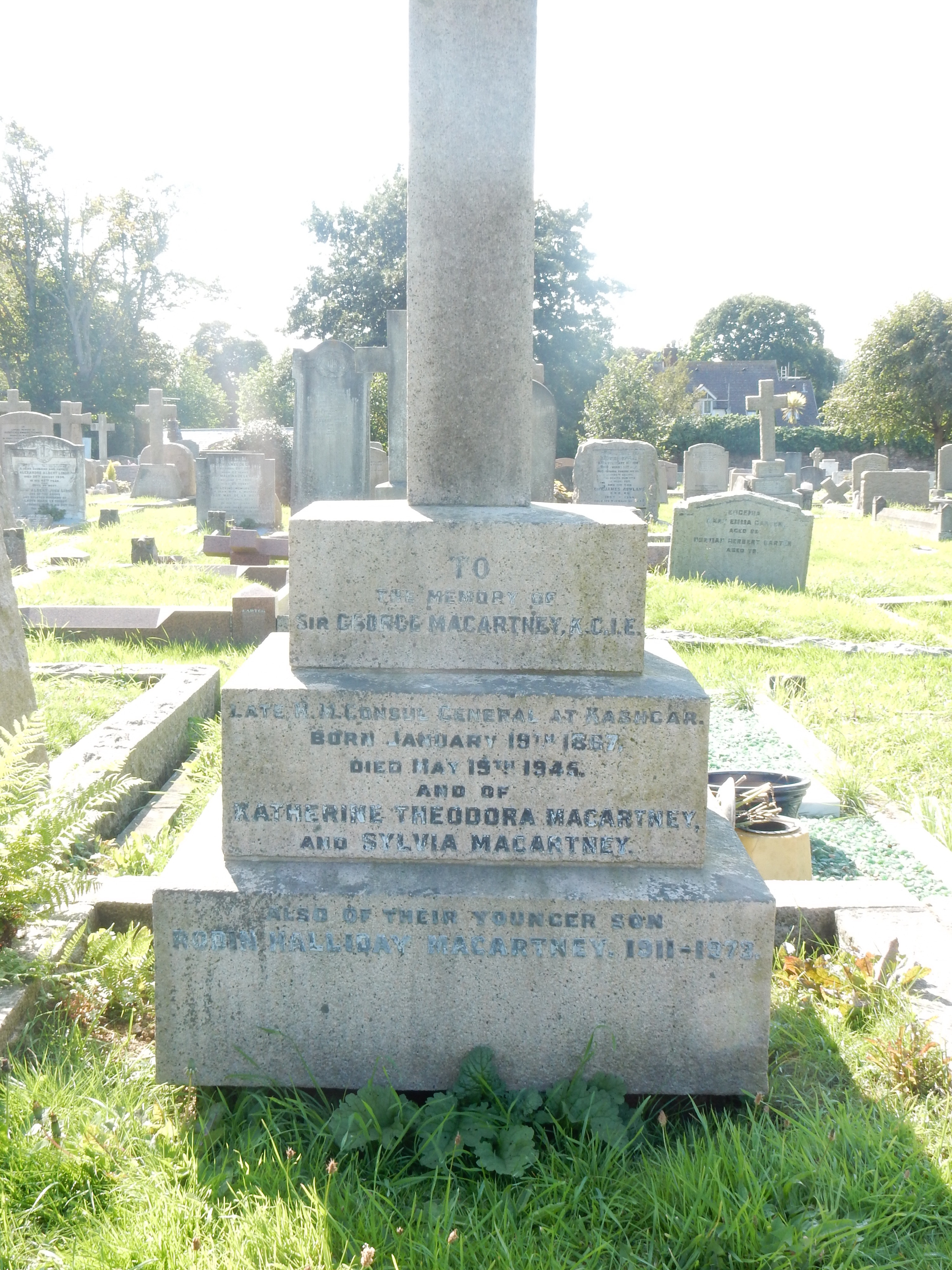
The grave of Sir George Macartney

== Writings ==
“Earthquakes in Kashgar”, in: The Geographical Journal, vol. 20, No. 4 (Oct. 1902), pp. 463–464

“Notices, from Chinese Sources, on the Ancient Kingdom of Lau-lan, or Shen-shen”, in: The Geographical Journal, vol. 21, no. 3, March 1903, pp. 260–265

“Eastern Turkestan: The Chinese as Rulers over an Alien Race”, in: Proceedings of the Central Asian Society, London, 1909

“Chinese Turkistan: Past and Present”, in: Notices of the Proceedings at the Meetings of the Members of the Royal Institution of Great Britain, vol. 22, 1917–1919, 534–536 [Lecture of Friday, May 9, 1919]

“Bolshevism as I saw it at Tashkent in 1918”, in: Journal of the Royal Central Asian Society, vol. 7, Nos. 2–3, 1920, p. 42-58

„Sin-Kiang. Mongols and Moslems of Chinese Turkistan”, in: Peoples of all Nations: Their Life Today and Story of Their Past, ed. Sir John Alexander Hammerton, vol. 6, 1922, 4649–4672

“Where Three Empires Meet”, in: Countries of the World described by the Leading Travel Writers of the Day. Vol. 6. Siberia to Zanzibar, ed. John Alexander Hammerton, London 1926, S. 4025–4045

== Bibliography ==
- Skrine, Clarmont Percival; Nightingale, Pamela (1973). Macartney at Kashgar: New Light on British, Chinese and Russian Activities in Sinkiang, 1890–1918. London, England: Methuen. ISBN 978-0415361712.
- Lady Macartney, An English Lady in Chinese Turkestan. London: Ernest Benn, 1931
