= Appointment with Death =

1938 mystery novel by Agatha Christie

- Dust-jacket illustration of the first UK edition
- Author: Agatha Christie
- Cover artist: Robin Macartney
- Language: English
- Series: Hercule Poirot
- Genre: Crime novel
- Publisher: Collins Crime Club
- Publication date: 2 May 1938
- Publication place: United Kingdom
- Media type: Print (hardback & paperback)
- Pages: 256 (first edition, hardback)
- Preceded by: Death on the Nile
- Followed by: Hercule Poirot's Christmas

Appointment with Death is a mystery novel by British writer Agatha Christie, first published in the UK by the Collins Crime Club on 2 May 1938 and in the US by Dodd, Mead and Company later in the same year. The UK edition retailed at seven shillings and sixpence (7/6) and the US edition at $2.00.

The book features the Belgian detective Hercule Poirot and reflects Christie's experiences travelling in the Middle East with her husband, the archaeologist Sir Max Mallowan. The main settings are Jerusalem and Petra.

== Plot introduction ==
Crime map showing "Petra, the place of sacrifice" from Dell Mapback #105

Holidaying in Jerusalem, Poirot overhears Raymond Boynton telling his sister, "You do see, don't you, that she's got to be killed?" Their stepmother, Mrs Boynton, is a sadistic tyrant who dominates her family. When she is found dead on a trip to Petra, Poirot proposes to solve the case in twenty-four hours, even though he has no way of knowing whether it was murder.

== Plot summary ==
The novel opens as the family and the victim are introduced through the perspective of newly qualified Dr Sarah King and Dr Gerard, who discuss the behaviour of the family. Mrs Boynton is sadistic and domineering, qualities which she may have carried over from her original profession of prison warden; she may instead have become a warden because she enjoyed having power over people. She has mentally and psychologically tortured her three stepchildren, Lennox, Carol and Raymond since they were toddlers, and carried this on to her own daughter Ginevra (Jinny).

Sarah is attracted to Raymond Boynton, while Jefferson Cope admits to wanting to take Nadine Boynton away from her husband, Lennox, subtly encouraged by Mrs Boynton, in hopes of further damage to Lennox. Jefferson, however, does not really understand the extent of Mrs Boynton's sadistic plans. Having been thwarted in her desire to free the young Boyntons, Sarah confronts Mrs Boynton, whose apparent reply is a strange threat: "I've never forgotten anything--not an action, not a name, not a face." When the party reaches Petra, Mrs Boynton uncharacteristically sends her family away from her for a period. Later, she is found dead with a needle puncture in her wrist. Before her death is discovered, Raymond, having fallen in love with Sarah, and Lennox, finally realising he could lose Nadine, separately decide to tell their mother they are leaving. Carol, who with Raymond, had talked of trying to release the whole family, and Jinny, who is on the verge of a breakdown, also had motives for killing Mrs Boynton. Other visitors to Petra, including Lady Westholme and Miss Pierce, have witnessed some of the events and may have important evidence.

Poirot, who is vacationing in Baghdad, is called in to investigate, and he claims that he can solve the mystery within twenty-four hours simply by interviewing the suspects. During these interviews, he establishes a timeline that seems impossible: Sarah King places the time of death considerably before the times at which various of the family members claim last to have seen the victim alive. Attention is focused on a hypodermic syringe that has seemingly been stolen from Dr Gerard's tent and later replaced. The poison administered to the victim is believed to be digitoxin, something that she already took medicinally.

Poirot then calls for a meeting and explains how each member of the family has, in turn, discovered Mrs Boynton to be dead and, suspecting another family member, failed to report the fact. None of the family would have needed to murder the victim with a hypodermic, since an overdose could have been administered much more effectively in her medicine, to which they had access. This places the suspicion on one of the outsiders.

The murderer is revealed to be Lady Westholme who, prior to her marriage, had been incarcerated in the prison in which the victim was once a warden. It was not to Sarah, but to Lady Westholme standing behind her, that Mrs Boynton had addressed that peculiar threat; the temptation to acquire a new subject to torture had been too great for her to resist. Lady Westholme feared that Mrs Boynton would divulge her criminal past and disrupt her political career. Disguised as an Arab servant, she had committed the murder and then relied upon the suggestibility of Miss Pierce to lay two pieces of misdirection that had concealed her role in the murder. Lady Westholme, eavesdropping on Poirot's summation from an adjoining room, overhears that her crime is about to be revealed to the world and commits suicide with a revolver she carried when travelling. The family, free at last, take up happier lives: Sarah marries Raymond; Carol marries Jefferson; and Ginevra takes up a successful career as a stage actress and marries Dr Gerard.

== Characters ==
- Hercule Poirot, renowned Belgian detective
- Colonel Carbury, senior figure in Emirate of Transjordan
- Mrs Boynton, the victim
- Ginevra Boynton, the victim's daughter
- Raymond Boynton, the victim's stepson
- Carol Boynton, the victim's stepdaughter
- Lennox Boynton, the victim's stepson
- Nadine Boynton, the victim's stepdaughter-in-law (Lennox's wife)
- Jefferson Cope, a family friend
- Dr Gerard, a French psychologist
- Dr Sarah King, a young doctor
- Lady Westholme, a member of Parliament
- Miss Amabel Pierce, a former nursery governess

== Literary significance and reception ==
Simon Nowell-Smith's review in the Times Literary Supplement of 7 May 1938 concluded that "Poirot, if the mellowing influence of time has softened many of his mannerisms, has lost none of his skill. His examination of the family, the psychologists and the few others in the party, his sifting of truth from half-truth and contradiction, his playing off one suspect against another and gradual elimination of each in turn are in Mrs Christie's most brilliant style. Only the solution appears a trifle tame and disappointing."

In The New York Times Book Review for 11 September 1938, Kay Irvin said, "Even a lesser Agatha Christie story holds its readers' attention with its skillful management of suspense. Appointment with Death is decidedly of the lesser ranks: indeed, it comes close to being the least solid and satisfactory of all the Poirot mystery tales. Its presentation of a family harried and tortured by a sadistic matriarch is shot full of psychological conversation and almost entirely deficient in plot. And yet, when the evil-hearted old tyrant has been murdered at last and Poirot considers the suspects, one follows with genuine interest the unraveling of even unexciting clues."

In The Observer's issue of 1 May 1938, "Torquemada" (Edward Powys Mathers) said, "I have to confess I have just been beaten again by Agatha Christie. There was no excuse. I was feeling in particularly good form; and the worst of it is that she handicapped herself in the latest game with what in anyone else would be insolent severity. Murder on the Nile (sic) was entirely brilliant; Appointment with Death, while lacking the single stroke of murderer's genius which provided the alibi in the former story, must be counted mathematically nearly twice as brilliant, since the number of suspects is reduced by nearly half. Indeed, though we begin our story in Jerusalem and meet our murder in Petra, the Red Rose City, we might as well be in a snowbound vicarage as far as the limitation of suspicion is concerned. And it is in this respect that Agatha Christie repeats her Cards on the Table triumph and beats Steinitz with a single row of pawns."

The Scotsman of 9 May 1938 said, "As usual, Miss Christie plays fair with her readers. While the solution comes with a shock of surprise, it is logical enough: the clues are there, one could fasten upon them and assess their importance. Perhaps it is another case of the reader being unable to see the wood for the trees; but there are so many trees. Not this author's best crime novel, Appointment with Death is yet clever enough and convincing enough to stand head and shoulders above the average work of the kind."

E R Punshon of The Guardian in his review of 27 May 1938 summarised: "For ingenuity of plot and construction, unexpectedness of dénouement, subtlety of characterisation, and picturesqueness of background, Appointment with Death may take rank among the best of Mrs Christie's tales."

Mary Dell in the Daily Mirror of 19 May 1938 said, "This is not a book I should recommend you to read last thing at night. The malignant eye of Mrs Boynton might haunt your sleep and make a nightmare of your dreams. It's a pretty eerily bloodcurdling tale. A grand book."

Robert Barnard wrote: "Notable example of the classic-era Christie, with excellent Near East setting, and the repulsive matriarch as victim. The family tensions around her are conveyed more involvingly than usual. The detection, with its emphasis on who-was-where-and-when, is a little too like Ngaio Marsh of the period, and there is some vagueness in the motivation, but this is as taut and atmospheric as any she wrote."

== References to other works ==
The novel mentions several other Poirot investigations: the detective is seen to retell to Colonel Carbury the story of Cards on the Table, and Colonel Race from this investigation is mentioned. Nadine Boynton actually confronts Poirot with his own actions in the conclusion of Murder on the Orient Express, Poirot suggesting that she was told by one of the case's figures. Miss Pierce also comments on The A.B.C. Murders when she recognises Poirot as a great detective.

== Publication history ==
- 1938, Collins Crime Club (London), 2 May 1938, Hardback, 256 pp
- 1938, Dodd Mead and Company (New York), 1938, Hardback, 301 pp
- 1946, Dell Books, Paperback, (Dell number 105 [mapback]), 192 pp
- 1948, Penguin Books, Paperback, (Penguin number 682), 206 pp
- 1957, Pan Books, Paperback, 159 pp (Pan number 419)
- 1960, Fontana Books (Imprint of HarperCollins), Paperback, 159 pp
- 1975, Ulverscroft Large-print Edition, Hardcover, 334 pp ISBN 0-85456-366-0

The first true publication of Appointment with Death occurred in the US with a nine-part serialisation in Collier's Weekly from 28 August (Volume 100, Number 9) to 23 October 1937 (Volume 100, Number 17) with illustrations by Mario Cooper.

The UK serialisation was in twenty-eight parts in the Daily Mail from Wednesday, 19 January to Saturday, 19 February 1938 under the title of A Date with Death. Fifteen of the instalments contained illustrations by J. Abbey (Joseph van Abbé, brother of Salomon van Abbé). This version did not contain any chapter divisions and omitted various small paragraphs such as the quote in Part I, Chapter twelve from Dr Gerard which is taken from Book IV of Ecclesiastes. The political argument between Lady Westholme and Dr Gerard in chapter ten about the League of Nations was also deleted. Finally, the epilogue did not appear in the serialisation.

Four days before the first instalment appeared, in the edition dated Saturday, 15 January, a piece specially written by Christie as an introduction to the serialisation appeared in the Daily Mail. She charted the creation of Poirot and expressed her feelings about him in the famous quote, "There have been moments when I have felt: 'Why-why-why did I ever invent this detestable, bombastic, tiresome little creature!'"

== Adaptations ==
=== Stage ===
Christie adapted the book as a play of the same name in 1945. It is notable for being one of the most radical reworkings of a novel Christie ever did, not only eliminating Hercule Poirot from the story, but also changing the identity of the killer. In the play, the ill Mrs Boynton committed suicide and dropped several red herrings that pointed to her family members as possible suspects, hoping that they would suspect each other and therefore continue to live in her shadow even after her death. In addition, the character of Carol Boynton has been dropped, Ginevra is now a stepdaughter (rather than a natural child) of Mrs Boynton, Lady Westholme becomes an ex-Member of Parliament, Miss Pierce is now Miss Pryce, and Alderman Higgs has been added as a fellow vacationer/verbal sparring partner for Lady Westholme.

=== Film ===
The novel was later adapted into the sixth of six films to star Peter Ustinov as Poirot, and released in 1988. The film retained the essential plot of the book, though the location of the murder was changed from Petra to Qumran, an archaeological site in Palestine. The cast included Lauren Bacall, Carrie Fisher, Sir John Gielgud, Piper Laurie, Hayley Mills, Jenny Seagrove, and David Soul. In the film, Miss Pierce was renamed Miss Quinton, and the character of Dr Gerard was removed.

=== Television ===
==== United States ====
The first television adaptation was as an episode of the CBS anthology series Danger, broadcast on 16 January 1951.

==== British ====
The novel was adapted for the eleventh season of the series Agatha Christie's Poirot starring David Suchet as Poirot. The screenplay was written by Guy Andrews and it was filmed in Casablanca (with Mahkama du Pacha acting as Hotel Constantine in the adaptation and Kasbah Boulaouane as the excavation site) and El Jadida, Morocco in May 2008. It was directed by Ashley Pearce, who also directed Mrs McGinty's Dead and Three Act Tragedy. The cast included Christina Cole, Tim Curry, John Hannah, Elizabeth McGovern and Zoe Boyle. The adaptation features a significant number of plot changes:

- Mrs Boynton is now Lady Boynton after having married newly added character Lord Boynton, an archaeologist searching for John the Baptist's head. She was previously Mrs Pierce and all references to her having worked in the prison system are removed.
- An added plot element features Sister Agnieszka, an agent of white slavers who attempts to abduct one of the Boynton girls.
- Lady Westholme's background and motivation are considerably different. In this version she is Dame Celia Westholme, an acclaimed author and traveler who was originally Mrs Pierce's maid. After a night with visiting houseguest Dr Gerard, she became pregnant, and was forced to give up her daughter, Jinny (Ginevra). Westholme and Gerard work together to murder Lady Boynton as revenge for the trauma she inflicted on their daughter and the other children.
- Additionally, Nanny Taylor, Lady Boynton's accomplice in the children's abuse, is also a new character.
- Lennox Boynton and Jefferson Cope are combined into one character, Leslie Jefferson Cope, an adopted sibling of the Boyntons who was eventually sent away.
- Nadine Boynton and Miss Amabel Pierce are absent.

==== French ====
The novel was adapted as a 2019 episode of the French television series Les Petits Meurtres d'Agatha Christie.

==== Japanese ====
The novel was adapted as a two hour special Shi to no Yakusoku (死との約束, lit. Promise of Death) by Fuji Television in Japan, continuing their series of adaptations of Christie stories for the Japanese market.

=== Radio ===
Appointment with Death was adapted by Michael Bakewell for BBC Radio 4, featuring John Moffatt as Poirot.
