= One, Two, Buckle My Shoe (novel) =

1940 Poirot novel by Agatha Christie

- Dust-jacket illustration of the first UK edition
- Author: Agatha Christie
- Cover artist: Not known
- Language: English
- Series: Hercule Poirot
- Genre: Crime novel
- Publisher: Collins Crime Club
- Publication date: November 1940
- Publication place: United Kingdom
- Media type: Print (hardback & paperback)
- Pages: 256 (first edition, hardback)
- Preceded by: Sad Cypress
- Followed by: Evil Under the Sun

One, Two, Buckle My Shoe is a mystery novel by the English writer Agatha Christie, first published in the United Kingdom by the Collins Crime Club in November 1940, and in the US by Dodd, Mead and Company in February 1941 under the title of The Patriotic Murders. A paperback edition in the US by Dell books in 1953 changed the title again to An Overdose of Death. The UK edition retailed at seven shillings and sixpence (7/6) while the United States edition retailed at $2.00.

The novel features both the Belgian detective Hercule Poirot and Chief Inspector Japp. This is Japp's final novel appearance. The plot of the novel concerns Poirot investigating the death of his dentist and other people.

At the time of publication, the novel was met with mixed reviews, as "compactly simple in narrative, with a swift course of unflagging suspense that leads to complete surprise." A later review by Robert Barnard in 1990 found "a fairly conventional murder mystery, beguilingly and cunningly sustained." while Christie has included characters of the politically unstable war time in which it was written, "political 'idealists', fascist movements and conservative financiers who maintain world stability."

== Plot summary ==
Poirot visits his dentist, Dr Morley, to have his teeth seen to. During the visit, Morley mentions that his secretary is away, and that her absence is a great inconvenience. As Poirot leaves the office, he encounters former actress Mabelle Sainsbury Seale as she exits a cab; he retrieves a lost shoe buckle for her. Later that day, Inspector Japp informs Poirot that Morley has been found dead of a gunshot wound to the head, the gun in his hand. Between Poirot's appointment and Morley's death, the dentist had seen three patients – Mabelle, prominent financier Alistair Blunt, and a Greek gentleman named Amberiotis. Howard Raikes, an American left-wing activist who wishes to marry Blunt's niece Jane Olivera, left the office without seeing Morley's partner Dr Reilly.

The same day, Amberiotis' body is found, dead from an overdose of anaesthetic. The police conclude Morley accidentally injected the overdose, and committed suicide upon realising his mistake, but Poirot does not accept this view. Later, Morley's secretary Gladys Nevill reveals that the telegram that decoyed her away turned out to contain a lie. Poirot remembers that Morley, who disliked Gladys' boyfriend Frank Carter, had believed Carter sent the telegram.

Mabelle disappears after speaking with the police. A month later, a badly disfigured body is found in the apartment of Mrs Sylvia Chapman, a woman who also has disappeared. Poirot notes the dullness of the buckled shoes on the body, which is wearing clothes like Mabelle's. However, dental records reveal the body to be that of Mrs Chapman.

Blunt invites Poirot to his country house, where he meets Blunt's cousin Helen and niece Jane. Later, a shot is fired at Blunt; the culprit is apparently Frank Carter, Blunt's new assistant gardener, as Raikes finds Carter holding a gun of the same make as the gun that killed Morley. Furthermore, Morley's maid Agnes Fletcher admits she saw Carter on the office's back stairs, before Morley's death. Poirot presses Carter, now held by police, for the truth. Carter admits he did go to confront Morley, and saw two men leave the office by the back stair; however, when Carter himself entered the office, Morley was already dead. Carter also claims that he found the gun in the shrubbery after hearing the shot, and never actually fired at Blunt.

Poirot confronts Blunt and accuses him of the murders. Blunt's "cousin" Helen Montressor is really his first wife, Gerda; the real Helen had died years before. Gerda and Mabelle had been in the same repertory theatre company in India when Blunt secretly married Gerda. He had not divorced Gerda before he married his now-deceased and socially appropriate second wife, Rebecca Arnholt. If his bigamy were exposed, he would be disgraced, lose the fortune he inherited from Arnholt, and be removed from his position of power. When Mabelle recognised Blunt years later, she knew nothing of his second marriage. Later, Mabelle met Amberiotis, a casual acquaintance, and mentioned encountering her old friend's husband. Amberiotis decided to blackmail Blunt by threatening to expose the bigamy.

The day of Poirot's appointment with Morley, Gerda and Blunt decoyed Morley's secretary away by the false telegram. Gerda had already invited Mabelle to an apartment she had secured under the alias of Mrs Chapman, poisoned her, and stole her identity. Gerda, as "Mabelle", then visited the dentist's waiting room, secure in her deception since Gladys was away. After Morley had taken care of Blunt's teeth, Blunt shot him, took Morley's place, and buzzed the page so he could send "Mabelle" up as the next patient. The two moved the body into a side room, and Gerda changed Mabelle's records to become those of Mrs Chapman and vice versa, to confuse the police. Gerda, as "Mabelle", left the office by the back staircase most patients usually took; Blunt, as "Morley", then saw Amberiotis (who had never met Morley or Blunt in person before), and injected his gum with the overdose. Once Amberiotis left, Blunt moved Morley's body back into the surgery, set up the "suicide" scene, and left, also via the back stair, unaware that he and Amberiotis had been seen leaving by Carter. Gerda wore new shoes when impersonating Mabelle, as she could not fit into Mabelle's larger shoes; she left Mabelle's own old shoes on the dead body, a detail that Poirot noticed. Later, Blunt had arranged a pistol in such a way that it would fire when Carter started trimming the hedge, setting him up as the scapegoat and planting the idea of a "public crime" (a politically motivated assassination) to take attention away from the real "private" motive for the murders.

Unrepentant, Blunt makes it clear he expects Poirot to cover for him because of his political importance. Poirot refuses; though he believes Blunt's policies are better for England than those of Blunt's opponents, he cannot leave the untimely deaths of three human beings unavenged. As Gerda and Blunt are arrested, Poirot meets Raikes and Olivera and tells them to enjoy their life together, asking that they allow freedom and pity within it.

== Characters ==
- Hercule Poirot, the Belgian detective
- Chief Inspector Japp of Scotland Yard
- Henry Morley, a dentist in London who is found dead soon after Poirot visits him
- Georgina Morley, his sister, who lives with her brother in a flat above the dental office
- Gladys Nevill, Morley's secretary
- Martin Alistair Blunt, a high-profile and powerful banker
- Rebecca Arnholt, wealthy deceased wife of Alistair Blunt who was 20 years his senior
- Julia Olivera, niece of Rebecca Arnholt, daughter of Rebecca's sister
- Jane Olivera, daughter of Julia Olivera, Rebecca Arnholt's grand niece
- Howard Raikes, Jane Olivera's lover, a leftist political activist from America
- Amberiotis, a heavy-set Greek man who is Morley's dental patient
- Mr Reginald Barnes, a dental patient of Mr Reilly and retired member of the Home Office
- Mabelle Sainsbury Seale, a patient at Morley's dental practice
- Frank Carter, boyfriend of Gladys
- Reilly, Morley's partner in the dental office
- George, Poirot's manservant
- Alfred Biggs, Morley's page boy
- Agnes Fletcher, the Morleys' maid
- Gerda Blunt (née Grant), Alistair Blunt's first wife

== Explanation of the novel's title ==
The book's UK title is derived from a well-known children's nursery rhyme of the same name, and the chapters each correspond to a line of that rhyme. Other Agatha Christie books and short stories also share this naming convention, such as Hickory Dickory Dock, A Pocket Full of Rye, Five Little Pigs, How Does Your Garden Grow? and – most famously – And Then There Were None.

== Major themes ==
This is the first of the Poirot novels to reflect the pervasive gloom of the Second World War, and is one of Christie's most overtly political novels. Frank Carter is a fascist and Howard Raikes a leftist. Mr Barnes discusses the main political forces freely with Poirot. Blunt's credentials as a champion of political and financial stability are made clear in the text. Nevertheless, given the choice between setting free a triple murderer who benefits society and allowing a distasteful yet innocent man, set up by the guilty person, to be hanged, Poirot saves Carter and lets Blunt be arrested.

== Literary significance and reception ==
Maurice Willson Disher in The Times Literary Supplement of 9 November 1940 was not impressed with either the novel or the genre when he said, "Possibly the reader who wants to be puzzled may be the best judge of a detective story. If so Agatha Christie wins another prize, for her new novel should satisfy his demands. But another type of reader will find it dry and colourless." He continued; "The facts are stated in a joyless style of impartial investigation; it quickens into life only when a revolting corpse is discovered. This is characteristic of Christie's school. The 'full horrible details' that bring people to death are accounted of more importance than details which bring people to life."

In The New York Times Book Review of 2 March 1941, Kay Irvin concluded, "It's a real Agatha Christie thriller: exceedingly complicated in plot, briskly and compactly simple in narrative, with a swift course of unflagging suspense that leads to complete surprise. After closing the book one may murmur, "Far-fetched", or even "Impossible". But any such complaint will be voiced only after the story has been finished; there won't be a moment to think of such things, before."

Maurice Richardson in the 10 November 1940 issue of The Observer stated, "The Queen of Crime's scheming ingenuity has been so much praised that one is sometimes inclined to overlook the lightness of her touch. If Mrs Christie were to write about the murder of a telephone directory by a time-table the story would still be compellingly readable." He did admit that the "[f]iend's identity is perhaps less obscured than usual; motivation a trifle shaky, but clue details are brilliant."

The Scotsman of 26 December 1940 said of the book that, "Although motive is not of the obvious order, Mrs Christie deals with the mystery in the most ingenious way and, as usual, produces a masterly solution."

E R Punshon in The Guardian of 13 December 1940 summed up by saying, "Mrs Christie has to work coincidence rather hard and the plot is more ingenious than probable, since the culprit could, and certainly would, have reached his end by simpler means than murder."

An unnamed reviewer in the Toronto Daily Star of 15 March 1941 referred to the story as a "neat puzzle" having a "highly involved plot" with a "not-unforeseen solution." The reviewer added, "the pace is swift and talk – curse of the English detective story – is kept to a minimum" and concluded by saying, "Far from usual is ... Christie's use of her thriller to expound a number of her own rather odd political opinions."

Robert Barnard wrote "It is usually said that Christie drags herself into the modern world in the 'fifties, but the books in the late 'thirties show her dipping a not-too-confident toe into the ideological conflicts of the pre-war years. Here we have political 'idealists', fascist movements and conservative financiers who maintain world stability. But behind it all is a fairly conventional murder mystery, beguilingly and cunningly sustained."

== References to other works ==
- In Part 3, x, of the novel, mention is made of Alistair Blunt's involvement in "the Herjoslovakian loan". Spelled as Herzoslovakia, this fictional country had featured prominently in The Secret of Chimneys (1925) and Poirot was there at the time of "The Stymphalean Birds", collected in The Labours of Hercules (1947).
- In Part 4, i, Poirot and Chief Inspector Japp joke that a plot involving a body being "put into the Thames from a cellar in Limehouse" is "like a thriller by a lady novelist," in a reference to Hastings' adventures in Agatha Christie's own novel The Big Four.
- In Part 7, iii, Poirot recollects the jewel thief, Countess Vera Rossakoff. Rossakoff, the nearest that Poirot comes to a love interest, appeared as a character in Chapter six of The Big Four (1927).
- In Part 8, ii, mention is made by name of the Case of the Augean Stables. This had been first published in The Strand in March 1940 but would not be collected in book form until 1947, in The Labours of Hercules.

== Adaptations ==
=== Television ===
The novel was adapted in 1992 for the series Agatha Christie's Poirot with David Suchet as Poirot.

=== Radio ===
The novel was adapted by Michael Bakewell for BBC Radio 4 in 2004, with John Moffatt as Poirot.

== Publication history ==
- 1940, Collins Crime Club (London), November 1940, Hardback, 256 p.
- 1941, Dodd Mead and Company (New York), February 1941, Hardback, 240 p. as The Patriotic Murders
- 1944, Pocket Books (New York), Paperback (Pocket number 249)
- 1956, Pan Books, Paperback, 192 p. (Pan number 380)
- 1959, Fontana Books (Imprint of HarperCollins), Paperback, 191 p.
- 1973, Ulverscroft Large-print Edition, Hardcover, 322 p.
- 2008, Poirot Facsimile Edition (Facsimile of 1940 UK First Edition), HarperCollins, 1 April 2008, Hardback, ISBN 0-00-727457-2

The book was first serialised in the US in Collier's Weekly in nine parts from 3 August (vol. 106, no 5) to 28 September 1940 (vol. 106, no. 13) under the title The Patriotic Murders with illustrations by Mario Cooper.
