= Hickory Dickory Dock (disambiguation) =

Hickory Dickory Dock is a popular English nursery rhyme.

Hickory Dickory Dock may also refer to:

- Hickory Dickory Dock (novel), a detective fiction novel by Agatha Christie
- "Hickory Dickory Dock", an episode of Teletubbies

== See also ==
- Hickory, Dickory, and Doc, three characters from the theatrical short Space Mouse
- Hickory (disambiguation)
- Dock (disambiguation)
