= Sad Cypress =

1940 mystery novel by Agatha Christie

- Dust-jacket illustration of the first UK edition
- Author: Agatha Christie
- Cover artist: Barlow
- Language: English
- Series: Hercule Poirot
- Genre: Crime novel
- Publisher: Collins Crime Club
- Publication date: March 1940
- Publication place: United Kingdom
- Media type: Print hardback & paperback
- Pages: 256 (first edition)
- Preceded by: Hercule Poirot's Christmas
- Followed by: One, Two, Buckle My Shoe

Sad Cypress is a mystery novel by British writer Agatha Christie, first published in the UK by the Collins Crime Club in March 1940 and in the US by Dodd, Mead and Company later in the same year. The UK edition retailed at eight shillings and threepence (8/3) – the first price rise for a UK Christie edition since her 1921 debut – and the US edition retailed at $2.00.

The novel was the first in the Poirot series set at least partly in the courtroom, with lawyers and witnesses exposing the facts underlying Poirot's solution to the crimes. The title is drawn from a song in William Shakespeare's play Twelfth Night.

The novel was well received at publication. One reviewer remarked "it is economically written, the clues are placed before the reader with impeccable fairness, the red herrings are deftly laid and the solution will cause many readers to kick themselves." Another reviewer found the story to be well told, but did not like that the plot "turns on a legal point" that is misconceived. A later review described it as "Elegiac, more emotionally involving than is usual in Christie, but the ingenuity and superb clueing put it among the very best of the classic titles."

== Plot summary ==
Elinor Carlisle and Roddy Welman are engaged to be married when she receives an anonymous letter claiming that someone is sucking up to their wealthy aunt, Laura Welman, from whom Elinor and Roddy expect to inherit a sizeable fortune. Elinor is niece to Mrs Welman and Roddy is nephew to her late husband. Elinor suspects the topic of the anonymous letter to be Mary Gerrard, the lodgekeeper's daughter, whom their aunt likes and supports. Neither guesses who wrote the letter, which is burned. They visit their aunt at Hunterbury and Roddy sees Mary Gerrard for the first time for a decade. Mrs Welman is partially paralyzed after a stroke and dislikes living that way. She tells both her physician, Peter Lord, and her niece how much she dislikes living without full health, wishing the doctor might end her pain, which he refuses to do. Roddy falls in love with Mary, which provokes Elinor to end their engagement. After a second stroke Mrs Welman asks Elinor to make provision for Mary. Elinor assumes there is a will her aunt wants modified. Mrs Welman dies before Elinor can call the solicitor. There is no will. She dies intestate, so her considerable estate goes to Elinor outright as her only known surviving blood relative.

Elinor settles two thousand pounds on Mary, which Mary accepts. Elinor sells the house she inherited. After an impromptu lunch at Hunterbury – after Elinor, at the house, and Mary with Nurse Hopkins, at the lodge, clear out private possessions – Mary dies of an overdose of morphine. Everyone at the house had access to a tube of morphine Nurse Hopkins claimed to have lost at Hunterbury while Mrs Welman was ill. Elinor is arrested. Later, after Mrs Welman's body is exhumed, it is learned that she also died of morphine poisoning. Peter Lord, in love with Elinor, brings Poirot into the case. Poirot speaks to everyone in the village. He uncovers a second suspect when Roddy tells him of the anonymous letter - the writer of that letter. Poirot then focuses on a few elements. Was the poison in the sandwiches made by Elinor, which all three ate, or in the tea prepared by Nurse Hopkins and drunk by Mary and Hopkins but not by Elinor? What is the secret of Mary's birth? Is there any significance in the scratch of a rose thorn on Hopkins's wrist? The denouement is revealed mainly in the court, as the defence lawyer brings witnesses who reveal what Poirot uncovers.

A torn pharmaceutical label that the prosecution says is from morphine hydrochloride, the poison, is rather a scrap from a label for apomorphine hydrochloride, an emetic, made clear because the m was lower case. The letters Apo had been torn off. Nurse Hopkins had injected herself with the emetic, to vomit the poison that she would ingest in the tea, explaining the mark on her wrist – not from a rose tree, which was a thornless variety, Zephirine Drouhin. She had gone to wash dishes that fateful day for privacy as she vomited, looking pale when Elinor joined her in the kitchen. The motive was money. Mary Gerrard was the illegitimate daughter of Laura Welman and Sir Lewis Rycroft. Had this been discovered sooner, she would have inherited Mrs Welman's estate. Nurse Hopkins knows Mary's true parents because of a letter from her sister Eliza some years earlier. When Hopkins encouraged Mary Gerrard to write a will, Mary named as beneficiary the woman whom she supposes to be her aunt, Mary Riley, the sister of Eliza Gerrard, in New Zealand. Mary Riley's married name is Mary Draper. Mary Draper of New Zealand it turns out is Nurse Hopkins in England, as two people from New Zealand who knew Mary Draper both confirm in court. Hopkins leaves the courtroom before the judge can recall her.

Elinor is acquitted and Peter Lord takes her away to where reporters can't find her. Poirot talks with Lord to explain his deductions and actions to him as he gathered information on the true murderer and how the "quickness of air travel" allowed witnesses from New Zealand to be brought to the trial. Poirot tells Lord he understands his clumsy efforts to get some action in Poirot's investigation. Lord's embarrassment is alleviated by Poirot's assurance that Lord will be Elinor's husband, not Roddy.

== Characters ==
- Hercule Poirot, the Belgian detective, who gives evidence in the trial of Elinor Carlisle.

The Victims:

- Mrs Laura Welman, wealthy widow who owns Hunterbury, an estate near Maidensford. She is proud, by her own description.
- Mary Gerrard, a beautiful young woman of 21 years, her protégée, and unacknowledged illegitimate daughter with Sir Lewis Rycroft

In the village

- Elinor Carlisle, Mrs Welman's niece, a beautiful, well-educated young woman of strong emotions.
- Roderick 'Roddy' Welman, nephew to the late Mr Welman.
- Dr Peter Lord, Mrs Welman's doctor, new to this practice.
- Nurse Jessie Hopkins, the District Nurse, known in New Zealand as Mary Riley Draper, sister to the late Mrs Gerrard. She did receive the letter to be sent to Mary, when living in New Zealand. She befriended Mary Gerrard.
- Nurse Eileen O'Brien, Mrs Welman's nurse since her stroke.
- Mr Seddon, Mrs Welman's solicitor who acts for Elinor first by making her will after Mrs Welman died and in her trial by securing the services of Mr Bulmer.
- Mrs Bishop, Mrs Welman's housekeeper for 18 years.
- Horlick, the gardener for Mrs Welman's estate.
- Ephraim 'Bob' Gerrard, the lodge keeper and Mary's legal father, by marrying Eliza Riley, the woman who claimed to be Mary's mother, after Mary was born. He dies after the two poison victims; Nurse Hopkins claims to find a letter to be sent to Mary upon his wife's death among his things, which she shows to Poirot.
- Eliza Gerrard, née Riley, once lady's maid to Mrs Welman, who claimed Mary as her own daughter, and late wife to Bob Gerrard.
- Sir Lewis Rycroft, married to a woman confined to a mental asylum, lover to the widowed Mrs Welman, died in the Great War before daughter Mary was born.
- Ted Bigland, a farmer's son, who likes Mary Gerrard.
- Mrs Slattery, housekeeper to Dr Lord's predecessor, who lived a long time in the village. Poirot interviewed her for all the gossip she might recall from times past.

In the courtroom

- The Judge, Mr Justice Beddingfeld, whose summary of the case is strongly for the defence.
- Sir Edwin Bulmer, Counsel for the defence, known as the "forlorn hope man", that is, cases looking bleak for the defendant.
- Sir Samuel Attenbury, Counsel for the prosecution.
- Dr Alan Garcia, expert witness for the prosecution.
- Inspector Brill, the investigating officer.
- Mr Abbott, the grocer and a witness.
- Alfred James Wargrave, a rose-grower and expert witness.
- James Arthur Littledale, a chemist and witness.
- Amelia Mary Sedley, a witness from New Zealand as to the identity of Mary Draper, whose wedding she had attended.
- Edward John Marshall, a witness from New Zealand as to the identity of Mary Draper.

== Title ==
The title comes from a song from Act II, Scene IV of Shakespeare's Twelfth Night which is printed as an epigraph to the novel.

Come away, come away, death,
And in sad cypress let me be laid;
Fly away, fly away breath;
I am slain by a fair cruel maid.
My shroud of white, stuck all with yew,
O, prepare it!
My part of death, no one so true
Did share it.

== Narrative voice and structure ==
The novel is written in three parts: in the first place an account, largely from the perspective of Elinor Carlisle of the death of her aunt, Laura Welman, and the subsequent death of Mary Gerrard; secondly Poirot's account of his investigation in conversation with Dr Lord; and, thirdly, a sequence in court, again mainly from Elinor's dazed perspective.

== Literary significance and reception ==
Maurice Percy Ashley in The Times Literary Supplement gave a positive review to the book in the issue of 9 March 1940: "In recent years the detective story-reading public has been so profusely drenched with thrills, 'wisecracks' and perverted psychology that one sometimes wonders whether there is still room for the old-fashioned straight-forward problem in detection. There are, however, a few first-class exponents of this art with us – though now that Miss Sayers has, for the moment at any rate, turned moralist and others have entered the easier field of thriller writing there seem to be increasingly few. Mrs Christie in particular remains true to the old faith; and it is pleasant to be able to record that her hand has not lost its cunning". The reviewer regretted that Poirot had lost some of his 'foibles' and Hastings no longer featured in the plots but he ended on a high note: "Like all Mrs Christie's work, it is economically written, the clues are placed before the reader with impeccable fairness, the red herrings are deftly laid and the solution will cause many readers to kick themselves. Some occasional readers of detective stories are wont to criticize Mrs Christie on the ground that her stories are insufficiently embroidered, that she includes, for instance, no epigrams over the college port. But is it not time to state that in the realm of detective fiction proper, where problems are fairly posed and fairly solved, there is no one to touch her?"

In The New York Times Book Review of 15 September 1940, Kay Irvin concluded, "The cast of characters is small, the drama is built up with all this author's sure, economical skill. Sad Cypress is not the best of the Christie achievements, but it is better than the average thriller on every count."

In reviewing several crime novels in The Observer's issue of 10 March 1940, Maurice Richardson began, "An outstanding crime week. Not only is Agatha Christie shining balefully on her throne, but the courtiers have made an unusually neat artistic arrangement of corpses up and down the steps." Concentrating on Sad Cypress specifically, Richardson concluded, "Characterisation brilliantly intense as ever. In fact, Agatha Christie has done it again, which is all you need to know."

The Scotsman's review in its issue of 11 March 1940 concluded, "Sad Cypress is slighter and rather less ingenious than Mrs Christie's stories usually are, and the concluding explanation is unduly prolonged. But it is only with reference to Mrs Christie's own high level that it seems inferior. By ordinary standards of detective fiction it is a fascinating and skilfully related tale."

E R Punshon in The Guardian's issue of 2 April 1940 concluded, "The story is told with all and even more of Mrs Christie's accustomed skill and economy of effect, but it is a pity that the plot turns upon a legal point familiar to all and yet so misconceived that many readers will feel the tale is deprived of plausibility."

Robert Barnard considered this novel to be "A variation on the usual triangle theme and the only time Christie uses the lovely-woman-in-the-dock-accused-of-murder ploy." His commentary on it was strongly positive, calling it "Elegiac, more emotionally involving than is usual in Christie, but the ingenuity and superb clueing put it among the very best of the classic titles. Her knowledge of poison is well to the fore, but the amateur will also benefit from a knowledge of horticulture and a skill in close reading."

== References to other works ==
Peter Lord says that he has been recommended to consult Poirot by Dr John Stillingfleet on the basis of Poirot's brilliant performance in the case related in the short story, "The Dream", which had been printed two years earlier in issue 566 of The Strand (magazine) and later printed in book form in The Adventure of the Christmas Pudding in 1960 in the UK and in The Regatta Mystery in the US in 1939. The character of Stillingfleet later reappears in Third Girl (1966).

One of the witnesses flown to the trial from New Zealand is named Amelia Sedley, a name borrowed from the novel Vanity Fair by William Makepeace Thackeray.

The character of Peter Lord appears to be a reference to the work of Christie's colleague and fellow member of the Detection Club, Dorothy L. Sayers. Sayers' Lord Peter Wimsey character also drives a Daimler, and in the 1930 novel Strong Poison he falls in love with a woman who is on trial for murder by poisoning.

== Adaptations ==
=== Radio ===
The novel was adapted as a five-part serial for BBC Radio 4 in 1992. John Moffatt reprised his role of Poirot. The serial was broadcast weekly from Thursday, 14 May to Thursday, 11 June at 10.00am to 10.30pm. All five episodes were recorded in the week of 16 to 20 March 1992.

Adaptor: Michael Bakewell
Producer: Enyd Williams

Cast:

- Eric Allan as Inspector Brill
- Jonathan Adams as Mr Wargrave
- Barbara Atkinson as Mrs Welman
- Margot Boyd as Mrs Bishop
- John Church as Dr Garcia, and Clerk
- Susannah Corbett as Mary Gerrard
- Alan Cullen as the Judge
- Keith Drinkel as Policeman
- Emma Fielding as Elinor Carlisle
- Eamonn Fleming as Ted Bigland
- Pauline Letts as Nurse Hopkins
- Peter Penry-Jones as Sir Samuel Atterbury
- David McAlister as Dr Lord
- John Moffatt as Hercule Poirot
- Joanna Myers as Nurse O'Brien, and as the singer of the title song
- Gordon Reid as Mr Littledale
- Charles Simpson as Roddy Welman
- John Webb as Mr Gerrard

=== Television ===
British adaptation

The book was adapted by London Weekend Television as a one-hundred-minute drama and transmitted on ITV in the UK on Friday 26 December 2003 as a special episode in their series Agatha Christie's Poirot. The adaptation was quite faithful to the novel, with the time being the only major change. In the end, Nurse Hopkins attempts to kill Poirot with poisoned tea but he pretends to drink it and pours the tea into a sugar bowl.

Adaptor: David Pirie
Director: David Moore

Cast:

- David Suchet as Hercule Poirot
- Elisabeth Dermot Walsh as Elinor Carlisle
- Rupert Penry-Jones as Roddy Winter
- Kelly Reilly as Mary Gerrard
- Paul McGann as Dr Peter Lord
- Phyllis Logan as Nurse Hopkins
- Marion O'Dwyer as Nurse O'Brien
- Diana Quick as Mrs Laura Welman
- Stuart Laing as Ted Horlick
- Jack Galloway as Marsden
- Geoffrey Beevers as Seddon
- Alistair Findlay as Prosecuting Counsel
- Linda Spurrier as Mrs. Bishop
- Timothy Carlton as Judge

Sad Cypress was filmed on location at Dorney Court, Buckinghamshire.

French adaptation

The novel was adapted as the sixth episode of the French television series Les Petits Meurtres d'Agatha Christie. The episode first aired in 2010.

== Publication history ==
- 1940, Collins Crime Club (London), March, hardcover, 256 pp
- 1940, Dodd Mead & Co (New York), hardcover, 270 pp
- 1946, Dell Books, paperback, 224 pp (Dell number 172 mapback)
- 1959, Fontana Books (imprint of HarperCollins), paperback, 191 pp
- 1965, Ulverscroft large-print, hardcover, 239 pp
- 2008, Poirot Facsimile Edition (of 1940 UK first edition), HarperCollins, 1 April 2008, hardback, ISBN 0-00-727459-9

The book was first serialised in the US in Collier's Weekly in ten parts from 25 November 1939 (volume 104, number 22) to 27 January 1940 (volume 105, number 4) with illustrations by Mario Cooper.

The UK serialisation was in nineteen parts in the Daily Express from Saturday, 23 March to Saturday, 13 April 1940. The accompanying illustrations were uncredited. This version did not contain any chapter divisions.
