= Murder on the Orient Express =

1934 mystery novel by Agatha Christie

- Dust-jacket illustration of the first UK edition
- Author: Agatha Christie
- Cover artist: Unknown
- Language: English
- Series: Hercule Poirot
- Genre: Crime novel
- Publisher: Collins Crime Club
- Publication date: 1 January 1934; 92 years ago
- Publication place: United Kingdom
- Media type: Print (hardback and paperback)
- Pages: 256 (first edition, hardcover)
- Preceded by: Lord Edgware Dies
- Followed by: Three Act Tragedy

Murder on the Orient Express is a mystery novel with a closed circle of suspects, written by English writer Agatha Christie and featuring the Belgian detective Hercule Poirot. It was first published in the United Kingdom by the Collins Crime Club on 1 January 1934. In the United States, it was published on 28 February 1934, under the title of Murder in the Calais Coach, by Dodd, Mead and Company. The UK edition retailed at seven shillings and sixpence (7/6) and the US edition at $2.

The elegant train of the 1930s, the Orient Express, is stopped by heavy snowfall. A murder is discovered, and Poirot's trip home to London from the Middle East is interrupted to solve the case. The opening chapters of the novel take place primarily in Istanbul. The rest of the novel takes place in Yugoslavia, with the train trapped between Vinkovci and Brod, in what is now northeastern Croatia.

The American title of Murder in the Calais Coach was used to avoid confusion with the 1932 Graham Greene novel Stamboul Train, which had been published in the United States as Orient Express.

== Plot ==
Although the Orient Express is fully booked (unusual for the season), detective Hercule Poirot obtains a sleeping berth through his friend and fellow passenger: Bouc, director of the luxury train company Compagnie Internationale des Wagons-Lits. Aboard are a shady American businessman named Ratchett, his secretary and translator Hector MacQueen, and Ratchett's English valet Edward Masterman. Other passengers include: American widow Caroline Hubbard; English governess Mary Debenham; Swedish missionary Greta Ohlsson; Italian-American car salesman Antonio Foscarelli; Russian Princess Dragomiroff and her German maid Hildegarde Schmidt; the Hungarian count Rudolph Andrenyi and his wife Helena; English colonel John Arbuthnot; American salesman Cyrus Hardman; and Greek medical doctor Stavros Constantine.

Wagon Constantinople Calais
Dining Car
Corridor	4. Masterman; 5. Foscarelli
Corridor	6. MacQueen; 7.
Corridor	8. Schmidt; 9.
Corridor	10. Ohlsson; 11. Debenham
Corridor	1. Poirot
Corridor	2. Ratchett
Corridor	3. Hubbard
Corridor	12. H. Andrenyi
Corridor	13. R. Andrenyi
Corridor	14. Dragomiroff
Corridor	15. Arbuthnot
Corridor	16. Hardman
Corridor	Michel
Athens Coach
First class compartments (1 person); Second class compartments (2 people); Compartment with dead body (1 person); Compartment with the conductor (1 person)

Ratchett has been receiving death threats so, when he recognises Poirot, he tries to hire him for protection but Poirot refuses. Early in the morning, Poirot is awakened by a cry from Ratchett's compartment next door. The train's conductor Pierre Michel knocks on the door, but a voice from inside pacifies him in French. Hubbard nervously tells Michel that a man has passed through her room. Michel informs Poirot that the train is now stuck in a snowdrift, caught far beyond Vinkovci station in Yugoslavia (today Croatia), before Poirot, hearing a loud thump nearby, observes a woman in a scarlet kimono moving down the corridor. He goes back to sleep.

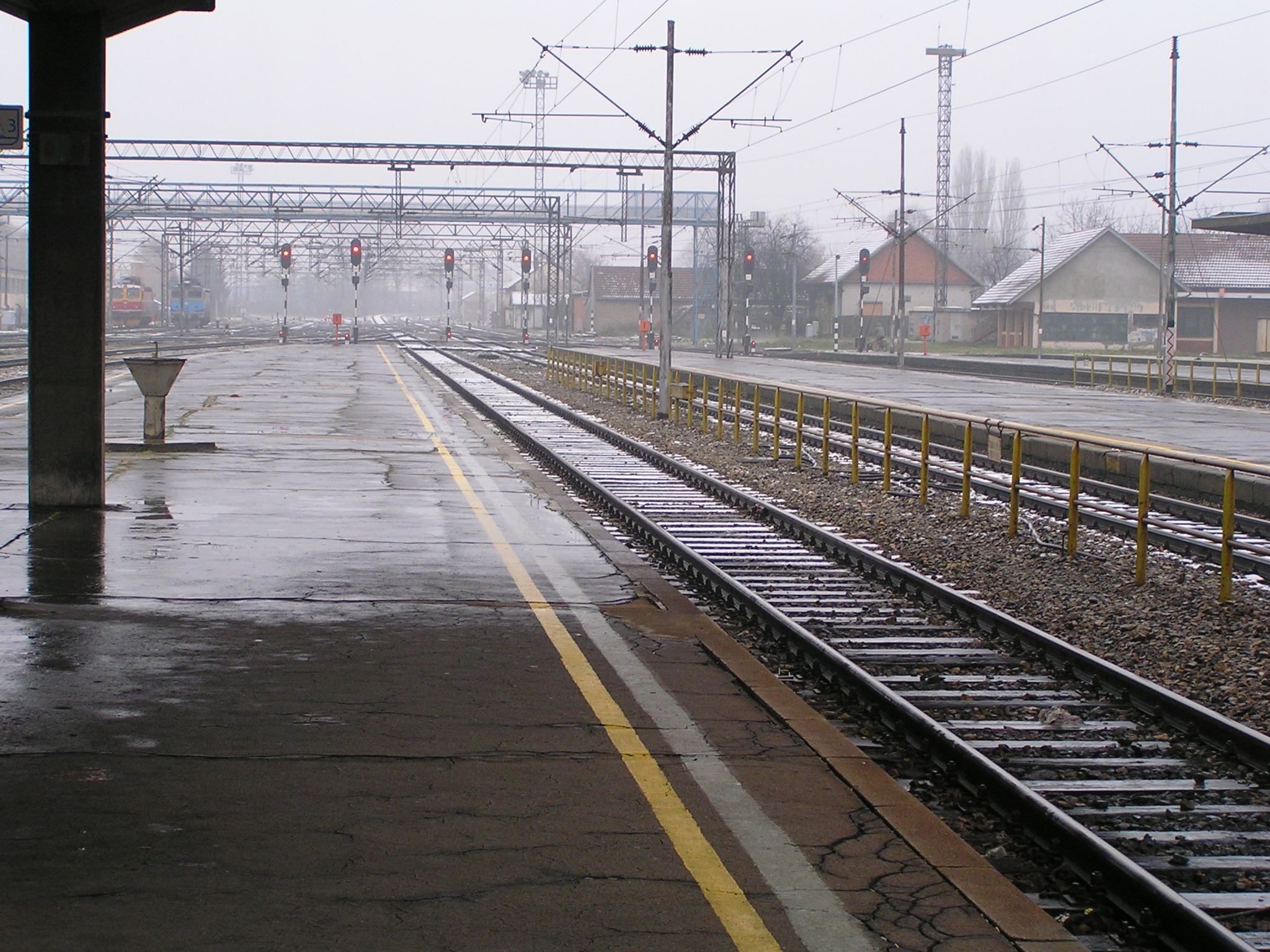
The railway station passenger terminal in Vinkovci, Croatia

Later, with the train still stalled, Bouc informs Poirot that Ratchett has been murdered and the murderer must still be aboard, having no way to escape in the heavy snow. With Dr. Constantine, Poirot examines Ratchett's compartment, discovering the following: an open window, Ratchett's body with twelve inconsistent stab wounds, a handkerchief with the initial "H", a pipe cleaner, a flat match different from the ones Ratchett used, and a charred piece of paper with "-member little Daisy Armstrong" written on it. Many years earlier, American gangster Cassetti kidnapped three-year-old Daisy Armstrong for a ransom from the wealthy Armstrong family. The child was killed and her mother, Sonia, who was pregnant, died during a premature labor. Her grieving husband, Colonel Armstrong, shot himself, and Daisy's French nursemaid, Susanne, was accused of aiding Cassetti and killed herself, only to be found innocent afterwards. Cassetti escaped justice, fleeing the country. Poirot deduces that "Ratchett" is an alias for the kidnapper Cassetti: the dead man on the train. Whoever had answered Pierre Michel earlier could not have been Cassetti, as Cassetti did not speak French.

Poirot begins interviewing everyone on the train, but they all provide suitable alibis for one another. Poirot notes that, though some of them observed the woman in the scarlet kimono the previous night, no one admits to owning such a kimono. Further, their emotional reactions to certain questions or inconsistencies in their stories causes Poirot to become further suspicious. Hardman admits that he too is a detective, hired to tail an assassin stalking Cassetti.

While inspecting the passengers' luggage, Poirot discovers that the label on Countess Andrenyi's luggage is wet and her passport smudged, Schmidt's bag contains the uniform in question, and Poirot's own luggage now contains the red kimono. Hubbard finds the murder weapon hidden in her sponge bag. Poirot, going into a trance-like state, ponders a solution to Cassetti's murder.

He calls in the suspects to the dining car and reveals their true identities: they were all connected to the Armstrong tragedy in some way. Countess Andrenyi is Daisy's aunt: a child herself at the time of the tragedy. Rudolph, her loving husband, smudged her luggage label and obscured her name to keep her above suspicion. Debenham was Helena's and Daisy's governess. Foscarelli was the Armstrongs' chauffeur. Masterman was Colonel Armstrong's valet. Michel is Susanne's father and the person who procured the false second uniform. Hubbard is actually an actress (Daisy's grandmother and Sonia's and Helena's mother). Schmidt was the Armstrongs' cook, and Ohlsson was Daisy's nurse. Princess Dragomiroff, who has already admitted to being Sonia's godmother, owns the monogrammed handkerchief, saying that her forename is Natalia, and the "H" is actually a Cyrillic letter "N". Arbuthnot is there on Debenham's behalf and his own, as he was a personal friend of Colonel Armstrong. Hardman is an ex-policeman who admits he was in love with Susanne. MacQueen, who had feelings for Sonia, was the son of the lawyer who represented the Armstrongs. Other than Poirot, the only passengers not involved in the murder are Bouc and Dr. Constantine, both having slept in the other coach, which was locked.

Poirot propounds two possible solutions, and permits Bouc and Dr. Constantine to choose the better one. The first is that an unidentified "enemy", who Cassetti had mentioned to Poirot earlier, boarded the train when it stopped at Vinkovci, wore a train conductor's disguise, and killed Cassetti, disembarking just before the train started off again. The second solution is that all the clues except the note about Daisy Armstrong were planted and that a conspiracy exists: Michel and most or all passengers in the coach stabbed Cassetti, taking revenge as a symbolic jury of twelve executioners. Hubbard confesses to the second solution and offers to take responsibility as the mastermind. Sympathetic towards Cassetti's justice-seeking avengers, however, Bouc and Dr. Constantine decide the first solution will be the one relayed to the police.

== Characters ==
- Hercule Poirot: world-famous detective from Belgium.
- Monsieur Bouc: Poirot's Belgian friend and a director of the Compagnie Internationale des Wagons-Lits.
- Samuel Ratchett/Cassetti: an American gangster who kidnapped and murdered three-year-old Daisy Armstrong.
- Dr. Stavros Constantine: a Greek physician, who, after the murder, determines Ratchett's time of death.
- Mrs. Caroline Hubbard: originally presenting as a loud and foolish American widow returning from visiting her daughter, she is revealed to be the American actress Linda Arden, Sonia Armstrong's mother and Daisy Armstrong's maternal grandmother.
- Mary Debenham: an English governess returning from Baghdad who was formerly Daisy Armstrong's governess.
- Colonel John Arbuthnot: Colonel Armstrong's English best friend, in love with Mary Debenham.
- Princess Natalia Dragomiroff: a Russian princess, Sonia Armstrong's godmother.
- Hector MacQueen: Ratchett's American secretary and translator, whose father was the Armstrongs' lawyer.
- Countess Helena Andrenyi: Sonia Armstrong's sister, notable as the only one of the thirteen suspects who did not participate in the murder.
- Count Rudolph Andrenyi: Countess Andrenyi's Hungarian husband, who took his wife's place as the twelfth murderer.
- Antonio Foscarelli: an Italian-American car salesman who was formerly the Armstrongs' chauffeur and had doted on Daisy.
- Greta Ohlsson: a Swedish missionary who was formerly Daisy Armstrong's nurse.
- Hildegarde Schmidt: Princess Dragomiroff's German maid, formerly the Armstrongs' cook
- Edward Henry Masterman: Ratchett's English valet, a remote and haughty man, who was Col. Armstrong's batman in the war and valet in New York.
- Cyrus Hardman: an American ex-policeman who was in love with Daisy Armstrong's French nursery maid, Susanne, who killed herself after being falsely accused of aiding Cassetti.
- Pierre Michel: the French train conductor and father of Daisy Armstrong's nursery maid, Susanne, who killed herself after being falsely accused of aiding Cassetti. A conductor of the same name previously appeared in The Mystery of the Blue Train.

== Writing ==
The kidnapping and murder of Charles Lindbergh's son in 1932 inspired that element in Christie's novel two years later. The novel used many elements of the real life case: a young child, firstborn of the family, was kidnapped for ransom directly from the crib, the parents were famous, the father was a well-known pilot and the mother pregnant, and the ransom was paid but the child found dead soon after. An innocent, but perhaps loose-lipped, maid employed by Lindbergh's parents was suspected of involvement in the crime. After being harshly interrogated by police, she killed herself.

Two less notable events helped inspire her novel: Agatha Christie's first journey on the Orient Express in late 1928, and a blizzard near Çerkezköy, Turkey, that thwarted the Orient Express's progress for six days just a few months later, in February 1929.

Flooding from rainfall that washed sections of track away in December 1931 halted Christie's return from her husband's archaeological dig at Nineveh aboard an Orient Express for 24 hours. Her authorised biography details that event in a complete quotation of a letter to her husband, which describes several passengers on her train who inspired both the plot and the characters in her novel, including an American, Mrs. Hilton, who inspired Mrs. Hubbard.

== Reception ==
The Times Literary Supplement of 11 January 1934 outlined the plot and concluded that "The little grey cells solve once more the seemingly insoluble. Mrs Christie makes an improbable tale very real, and keeps her readers enthralled and guessing to the end."

In The New York Times Book Review of 4 March 1934, Isaac Anderson wrote, "The great Belgian detective's guesses are more than shrewd; they are positively miraculous. Although both the murder plot and the solution verge upon the impossible, Agatha Christie has contrived to make them appear quite convincing for the time being, and what more than that can a mystery addict desire?"

The reviewer in The Guardian of 12 January 1934 noted that the murder would have been "perfect" (i.e. a perfect crime) had Poirot not been on the train and also overheard a conversation between Miss Debenham and Colonel Arbuthnot before he boarded; however, Poirot's "'little grey cells' worked admirably, and the solution surprised their owner as much as it may well surprise the reader, for the secret is well kept and the manner of the telling is in Mrs Christie's usual admirable manner."

Robert Barnard said that this novel was "The best of the railway stories. The Orient Express, snowed up in Yugoslavia, provides the ideal 'closed' set-up for a classic-style exercise in detection, as well as an excuse for an international cast-list. Contains my favourite line in all Christie: 'Poor creature, she's a Swede.' Impeccably clued, with a clever use of the Cyrillic script (cf. The Double Clue). The solution raised the ire of Raymond Chandler, but won't bother anyone who doesn't insist his detective fiction mirror real-life crime." The reference is to Chandler's criticism of Christie in his essay The Simple Art of Murder. H.R.F. Keating included the novel in his list of "100 Best Crime and Mystery Books". In 1995, the novel was included in Mystery Writers of America's The Top 100 Mystery Novels of All Time list. In December 2014, the novel was included in Entertainment Weekly's list of the Nine Great Christie Novels.

== Adaptations ==
=== Radio ===
John Moffatt starred as Poirot in a five-part BBC Radio 4 adaptation by Michael Bakewell, directed by Enyd Williams, and originally broadcast from 28 December 1992 – 1 January 1993. André Maranne appeared as Bouc, Joss Ackland as Ratchett/Cassetti, Sylvia Syms as Mrs Hubbard, Siân Phillips as Princess Dragomiroff, Francesca Annis as Mary Debenham, and Peter Polycarpou as Dr. Constantine.

In 2017, the streaming service Audible released another radio adaptation that featured Tom Conti as the voice of Poirot. The voice cast also featured Sophie Okonedo as Mary Debenham, Eddie Marsan as Ratchett/Cassetti, and narration from Art Malik.

The Soviet radio play was released in 1966. The voice cast featured Vsevolod Yakut as Poirot, Rostislav Plyatt as Colonel Arbuthnot, Maria Babanova as Hubbard, Oleg Yefremov as Hector McQueen, Leonid Kanevsky as Antonio Foscarelli, Angelina Stepanova as Princess Dragomiroff and Alexander Lazarev as Hardman.

=== Film ===
==== Murder on the Orient Express (1974) ====
The book was made into a 1974 movie directed by Sidney Lumet and produced by John Brabourne and Richard B. Goodwin; it was a critical and commercial hit. The film starred Albert Finney as Poirot, Martin Balsam as Signor Bianchi, George Coulouris as Dr Constantine, and Richard Widmark as Ratchett/Cassetti, with the remaining cast of suspects including Sean Connery (Arbuthnot), Lauren Bacall (Mrs Hubbard), Anthony Perkins (MacQueen), John Gielgud (Beddoes), Michael York (Count Andrenyi), Jean-Pierre Cassel (Pierre Michel), Jacqueline Bisset (Countess Andrenyi), Wendy Hiller (Princess Dragomiroff), Vanessa Redgrave (Mary Debenham), Rachel Roberts (Hildegarde Schmidt), Colin Blakely (Hardman), Denis Quilley (Foscarelli), and Ingrid Bergman (Greta Ohlsson), who won the 1974 Academy Award for Best Supporting Actress. Only minor changes were made for the film: Mary Debenham was the Armstrongs' secretary rather than Daisy's governess; Masterman was renamed Beddoes; the dead maid was named Paulette instead of Susanne; Helena Goldenberg became Helena Grünwald (which is German for "Greenwood"); Antonio Foscarelli became Gino Foscarelli; Caroline Martha Hubbard became Harriet Belinda Hubbard; and the train company's Belgian director, Monsieur Bouc, became instead an Italian director, Signor Bianchi.

==== Murder on the Orient Express (2017) ====
On 16 June 2015, 20th Century Fox hired Kenneth Branagh to direct and star as Poirot in another film adaptation of the story, which was released on 3 November 2017. On 29 September 2016, the studio issued a press release announcing much of the cast, including Johnny Depp as Ratchett, Michelle Pfeiffer as Mrs Hubbard, Penélope Cruz as Pilar Estravados (a Spanish version of Greta Ohlsson, the name coming from a character in Hercule Poirot's Christmas), Judi Dench as Princess Dragomiroff, Derek Jacobi as Masterman, Leslie Odom Jr. as Dr Arbuthnot, Daisy Ridley as Mary Debenham, Lucy Boynton as Countess Andrenyi, Tom Bateman as Monsieur Bouc, Manuel Garcia-Rulfo as Biniamino Marquez (a Cuban version of Antonio Foscarelli), Josh Gad as Hector MacQueen, Marwan Kenzari as Pierre Michel, Sergei Polunin as Count Andrenyi, Willem Dafoe as Cyrus Hardman, and Olivia Colman as Hildegarde Schmidt. The character of Col. Arbuthnot is combined with Dr. Constantine to create Dr. Arbuthnot, a sniper who served under Col. Armstrong in the war and had his medical school paid for by Armstrong; MacQueen's father is portrayed as having been a prosecutor in the Armstrong case rather than the Armstrong family's lawyer, and whose career was ruined after he prosecuted the maid Susanne; and Monsieur Bouc is changed from the director of the company to the director's nephew. Added was a direct link for Poirot to the Armstrong kidnapping—before Sonia's death, John Armstrong wrote to Poirot for help. Also unlike the book, the kidnapping does not take place on Long Island but in New Jersey, where the Lindbergh kidnapping took place. Susanne Michel is switched from Pierre Michel's daughter to his sister. Cyrus Hardman poses as an Austrian scientist named Gerhard Hardman for part of the film. The last scene also sets up Death on the Nile as a sequel.

=== Television ===
==== German adaptation (1955) ====
The novel was first adapted as a 1955 episode of the West German television series Die Galerie der großen Detektive. Heini Göbel played the role of Poirot.

==== Murder on the Orient Express (2001) ====
A thoroughly modernized and poorly received made-for-TV version starring Alfred Molina as Poirot was presented by CBS in 2001. This version co-starred Meredith Baxter as Mrs Hubbard and Leslie Caron as Señora Alvarado (based on Princess Dragomiroff, and portrayed as the widow of a South American dictator). Poirot is portrayed as significantly younger and less eccentric than Christie's detective, and is given a subplot involving a romantic relationship with Vera Rosakoff, who is loosely based on an infrequently recurring character of the same name. The story is updated to a contemporary setting, and four of the suspects (Hildegarde Schmidt, Cyrus Hardman, Edward Masterman and Greta Ohlsson) are deleted, as is Dr Constantine.

==== Agatha Christie's Poirot: "Murder on the Orient Express" (2010) ====
David Suchet reprised the role of Hercule Poirot in "Murder on the Orient Express" (2010), a 90-minute movie-length episode of the television series Agatha Christie's Poirot co-produced by ITV Studios and WGBH-TV, adapted for the screen by Stewart Harcourt. The original air date was 11 July 2010 in the United States, and it was aired on Christmas Day 2010 in the UK.

The cast includes Dame Eileen Atkins as Princess Dragomiroff, Hugh Bonneville as Masterman, Jessica Chastain as Mary Debenham, Barbara Hershey as Mrs Hubbard, Toby Jones as Ratchett, and David Morrissey as Colonel Arbuthnot.

The character Cyrus Hardman (the former American police officer turned private detective) has been largely amalgamated with the chauffeur Foscarelli (inasmuch as being the lover of the dead maid) and Dr Constantine (who in the novel is unrelated to the murders) becomes a co-conspirator, depicted as having been the Armstrong family's doctor in America.

As in the 2017 film, MacQueen's father was the prosecutor rather than the Armstrongs' lawyer, whose career was ruined after he was threatened into acquitting Cassetti. The adaptation's treatment of Ratchett's murder is much darker than the novel. The killers gather in his cabin and stab him one by one while he is drugged but awake, rather than stabbing him independently while he is unconscious. The ending dwells on Poirot's horror at the act of mob justice and his moral conflict, in view of his Catholic faith and commitment to the law, when he decides not to tell the Yugoslavian police what he knows.

The interior of the Orient Express was reproduced at Pinewood Studios in London, while other locations include the Freemason Hall, Nene Valley Railway, and a street in Malta (shot to represent Istanbul).

==== Japanese TV adaptation (2015) ====
A Japanese adaptation was broadcast over two nights in January 2015 on Fuji Television, titled Orient Kyūkō Satsujin Jiken, and it featured several famous actors, including Ninomiya Kazunari, Matsushima Nanako, Tamaki Hiroshi, Kichise Michiko, Nishida Toshiyuki, and Sawamura Ikki. The main character, Suguro Takeru, modeled on Hercule Poirot, was played by actor Nomura Mansai.

The first night featured a storyline true to the original text, but set in Japan in 1933. In this version, the train Orient Kyūkō ran from the western city of Shimonoseki to Tokyo, with the train stopped by a small avalanche near Sekigahara, Gifu.

The second night was an original story.

=== Stage ===
American playwright Ken Ludwig adapted the novel into a play, Murder on the Orient Express, which premiered at the McCarter Theatre in Princeton, New Jersey on 14 March 2017. The production was directed by Emily Mann, and starred Allan Corduner in the role of Hercule Poirot.

In 2024, Old Globe Theatre presented the Asolo Repertory Theatre Production reprise of the Ken Ludwig adaptation. Andrew Sellon led the cast in the starring role previously played at Maltz Jupiter Theatre. The stage's turntable rotated between the train exterior, the dining car, the sleeping compartments, and the parlor car as snow effects set the scene.

=== Comics ===
Murder on the Orient Express was adapted into an authorized graphic novel illustrated by Bob Al-Greene and published by William Morrow Paperbacks on 12 September 2023.

=== Games ===
A board game based on the novel named Orient Express was released in 1985.

The Korean gacha game Limbus Company has a side story chapter titled "Murder on the Warp Train Express" featuring characters that reference the original book.

The point and click computer game Agatha Christie: Murder on the Orient Express was released in November 2006 for Windows and expanded on Agatha Christie's original story, revolving around Antoinette Marceau – a new character created specifically for the game – as Hercule Poirot (voiced by David Suchet) is ill and recovering in his train compartment.

On October 19, 2023, Microids released a new video game adaptation titled Agatha Christie – Murder on the Orient Express. Having one prologue and thirteen chapters, Agatha Christie – Murder on the Orient Express faithfully adapts and modernizes the novel's plot, with the main characters retaining their original names and using mobile phones and computers. Players alternately take on the two roles of Poirot and an American detective named Joanna Locke. For four years, Locke has been investigating the kidnapping and murder of Daisy Armstrong, and boarded the Orient Express in a failed attempt to arrest Cassetti for the crime and prove Susanne's innocence. Switching between flashbacks and the present time, the in-game investigation progresses as Poirot and Locke exchange clues regarding Cassetti and the Armstrong case. While the first eight chapters of the game adapt the entire novel, a twist expands the plot by adding a thirteenth killer, who had murdered Cassetti before the Armstrongs' and Susanne's loved ones unleashed their revenge on him. The five remaining chapters of the game revolve around Poirot and Locke hunting down the perpetrator and bringing to light Cassetti's own crimes and other victims. Agatha Christie – Murder on the Orient Express is available on PC and PlayStation, Xbox, and Nintendo Switch consoles.

== Publication history ==
- 1934, Collins Crime Club (London), 1 January 1934, Hardcover, 256 pp.
- 1934, Dodd Mead and Company (New York), 1934, Hardcover, 302 pp.
- c.1934, Lawrence E. Spivak, Abridged edition, 126 pp.
- 1940, Pocket Books (New York), Paperback, (Pocket number 79), 246 pp.
- 1948, Penguin Books, Paperback, (Penguin number 689), 222 pp.
- 1953, Collins Crime Club 'New Edition' (i.e. 2nd Collins edition)
- 1957, Nelson Doubleday, Inc. (Garden City, N.Y.) published as part of “A Treasury of Great Mysteries”, 576 pp. with the title of “Murder in the Calais Car” 137 pp.
- 1959, Fontana Books (Imprint of Collins), Paperback, 192 pp.
- 1965, Ulverscroft Large-print Edition, Hardcover, 253 pp. ISBN 0-7089-0188-3
- 1968, Greenway edition of collected works (William Collins), Hardcover, 254 pp.
- 1968, Greenway edition of collected works (Dodd Mead), Hardcover, 254 pp.
- 1974, Pocket Books (New York) (with cover illustration of the cast of Sidney Lumet's movie by Allan Mardon [misspelled "Marden"]) November 1974, 34th printing, Paperback, viii, 198 p.
- 1978, Pocket Books (New York), Paperback
- 2006, Poirot Facsimile Edition (Facsimile of 1934 UK first edition), 4 September 2006, Hardcover, 256 pp. ISBN 0-00-723440-6
- 2011, William Morrow (HarperCollins), Paperback, 265 pp.
- 2017, HarperCollins, paperback, 288 pp, ISBN 9780008226671

The story's first true publication was the US serialisation in six instalments in the Saturday Evening Post from 30 September to 4 November 1933 (Volume 206, Numbers 14 to 19). The title was Murder in the Calais Coach, and it was illustrated by William C. Hoople.

The UK serialisation appeared after book publication, appearing in three instalments in the Grand Magazine, in March, April, and May 1934 (Issues 349 to 351). This version was abridged from the book version (losing some 25% of the text), was without chapter divisions, and named the Russian princess as Dragiloff instead of Dragomiroff. Advertisements in the back pages of the UK first editions of The Listerdale Mystery, Why Didn't They Ask Evans, and Parker Pyne Investigates claimed that Murder on the Orient Express had proven to be Christie's best-selling book to date and the best-selling book published in the Collins Crime Club series.

== See also ==
- Baron Hotel – where Christie wrote the first part of the novel
- Pera Palace Hotel – where Christie supposedly wrote the novel, although this is not stated in either her official biography or her own Autobiography
- Orient Express – the service on which Christie based her novel
- Lindbergh kidnapping – the inspiration for Daisy Armstrong
