= A Pocket Full of Rye =

1953 mystery novel by Agatha Christie

- First UK edition
- Author: Agatha Christie
- Language: English
- Series: Miss Marple novels
- Genre: Crime novel
- Publisher: Collins Crime Club
- Publication date: 9 November 1953
- Publication place: United Kingdom
- Media type: Print (hardback)
- Pages: 192
- Preceded by: They Do It with Mirrors
- Followed by: 4:50 from Paddington

A Pocket Full of Rye is a mystery novel by Agatha Christie first published in the UK by the Collins Crime Club on 9 November 1953 and in the US by Dodd, Mead & Co. the following year. The UK edition retailed at ten shillings and sixpence (10/6) and the US edition at $2.75. The book features her detective Miss Marple.

Like several of Christie's novels (e.g. Hickory Dickory Dock and One, Two, Buckle My Shoe) the title and substantial parts of the plot refer to a nursery rhyme, in this case "Sing a Song of Sixpence". Miss Marple travels to the Fortescue home to offer information on the maid, Gladys Martin. She works with Inspector Neele until the mysteries are revealed.

Two reviewers at the time of publication felt that "the hidden mechanism of the plot is ingenious at the expense of probability" and that the novel was "Not quite so stunning as some of Mrs Christie's criminal assaults upon her readers". Christie's overall high quality in writing detective novels led one to say "they ought to make her a Dame". Writing later, another reviewer felt that the characters included an "exceptionally nasty family of suspects" in what was "Still, a good, sour read."

== Plot ==
After London businessman Rex Fortescue dies after drinking his morning tea, Scotland Yard Detective Inspector Neele leads the investigation. An autopsy reveals that the cause of death was poisoning by taxine, a toxic alkaloid obtained from the yew tree, and that Fortescue had ingested it with his breakfast. A search of his clothing reveals a quantity of rye seeds in his jacket pocket.

Rex's wife, Adele, is the main suspect. Rex's son Lancelot and his wife, Pat, are travelling from Kenya to London, at the invitation of his father according to Lance; in Paris he wires that he will be home next day, and police meet him at the airport. The same day that Lance arrives at Yewtree Lodge, leaving his wife in London, Adele dies of cyanide in her tea, and a few hours later the maid, Gladys Martin, is found strangled in the yard, with a clothespeg on her nose.

Assisted by Sergeant Hay, Inspector Neele interviews all at Rex's office and at home. The older son, Percival, tells the Inspector that his father was erratic, and was ruining the business. After the story of the three murders appears in the newspapers, Miss Marple arrives to shed light on Gladys Martin, who had originally trained as a servant at Miss Marple's home. Miss Ramsbottom, Rex's sister-in-law, invites her to stay at Yewtree Lodge.

Inspector Neele agrees to work with Miss Marple. Neele learns that the taxine was ingested in marmalade, with a new jar put out at breakfast that had been used by Rex alone; that jar was later found by police thrown into the garden. Miss Marple asks Inspector Neele if he has enquired of the suspects about blackbirds, having noted the pattern of the old children's rhyme Sing a Song of Sixpence. When he does so, he learns of dead blackbirds on Rex's desk at home, a pie whose contents were removed and replaced with dead birds and, from Lance, of a Blackbird Mine in East Africa.

The Blackbird Mine had been found by a Mr MacKenzie and was suspected of containing gold. Rex Fortescue investigated the land after investing capital in it, then left MacKenzie there to die, returning alone as owner of land that he believed was of no value. Mrs MacKenzie had subsequently blamed Rex for her husband's death, promising to teach her children to avenge their father. Both the Inspector and Miss Marple suspect that the daughter may be in the household under an assumed name, the son having died in the war. The Inspector suspects Mary Dove, the housekeeper, and tells her so; later, Jennifer Fortescue, wife of Percival, tells Miss Marple that she is the MacKenzies' daughter. Jennifer had put out the dead blackbirds near Rex to remind him of his past offence; Miss Marple realises this gives the theme to the murderer. Dove promptly blackmails Jennifer; Inspector Neele says if Dove pays the money back, he will not charge her.

Miss Marple explains to Inspector Neele who killed Rex Fortescue: Gladys, who at the direction of her boyfriend, Albert Evans, had put the poison in the marmalade believing it was a truth drug, and had put the rye into the victim's pocket. The unattractive Gladys was very easy to flatter and persuade, never questioning her boyfriend's motives. Miss Marple explains that Albert Evans is really Lance Fortescue, who wants the deed to the Blackbird Mine, knowing that uranium ore has been found there. He arranged the murder of his father to stop the loss of cash, and to leave only his brother to deal with. He quickly murdered his stepmother since, had she lived for 30 days after Fortescue's death, she rather than he would have inherited. He killed Gladys to prevent her talking, placing the clothespeg to match the line in the rhyme.

When Miss Marple returns home, a delayed letter from Gladys awaits her. She explains all she did, and begs for Miss Marple's help, saying that she does not know what to do. She encloses a photograph of her boyfriend Albert – clearly Lance Fortescue. Inspector Neele's case against the murderer will be very strong.

== Principal characters ==
- Miss Marple: amateur sleuth.
- Miss Griffith: head typist at the offices of Rex Fortescue.
- Miss Irene Grosvenor: competent, beautiful blonde secretary to Rex Fortescue.
- Miss Somers: newest secretary in the office of Rex Fortescue.
- Inspector Neele: Police Detective Inspector.
- Professor Bernsdorff: Pathologist at St Jude's hospital.
- Sergeant Hay: assists Inspector Neele.
- Rex Fortescue: Wealthy, unscrupulous businessman in London and the first victim.
- Percival Fortescue: eldest son of Rex, and working with him in the business. About 30 years old. He is known as either Percy or Val.
- Jennifer Fortescue: wife of Percival. Known as Ruby MacKenzie before her marriage.
- Lancelot Fortescue: Rex's second son, known as Lance. Lives in Kenya. He is handsome, attractive, clever and unscrupulous.
- Pat Fortescue: Lance's wife.
- Elaine Fortescue: Rex's daughter and youngest child, in her twenties.
- Gerald Wright: schoolmaster loved by Elaine.
- Miss Ramsbottom: Aunt Effie, older sister of Rex's first wife, Elvira, the mother of their children.
- Adele Fortescue: Rex's second wife, and the second victim.
- Vivien Edward Dubois: golf and tennis partner and lover of Mrs Fortescue. He is the sole heir in her will.
- Mary Dove: housekeeper of Yewtree Lodge. She is competent and calm.
- Mrs Crump: cook.
- Mr Crump: butler.
- Gladys Martin: parlour maid and third victim.
- Albert Evans: Gladys's boyfriend. A false identity used by Lance Fortescue.
- Ellen Curtis: housemaid.
- Mrs MacKenzie: Mr MacKenzie's widow.
- Donald and Ruby MacKenzie: the MacKenzies' two children, aged 9 and 7 when their father died. Their mother raised them to avenge their father's death. Donald was killed early in the Second World War.

== Literary significance and reception ==
Philip John Stead in The Times Literary Supplement, 4 December 1953 wrote that "Miss Christie's novel belongs to the comfortable branch of detective fiction; it never harrows its readers by realistic presentation of violence or emotion or by making exorbitant demands on their interest in the characters. Crime is a convention, pursuit an intellectual exercise, and it is as if the murderer of the odious financier did but poison in jest. The characters are lightly and deftly sketched and an antiseptic breeze of humour prevails. It is a pleasure to read an author so nicely conscious of the limitations of what she is attempting." He concluded, "Miss Christie has a reputation for playing fair with the reader who likes to assume detective responsibility, and also for being one too many for him. In the present case it may be felt that the hidden mechanism of the plot is ingenious at the expense of probability, but the tale is told with such confidence that (like murder itself, in this pastoral atmosphere) it does not matter very much."

Maurice Richardson in The Observer (15 November 1953) posited, "Not quite so stunning as some of Mrs Christie's criminal assaults upon her readers; the soufflé rises all right, but the red herrings aren't quite nifty enough. But how well she nearly always writes, the dear decadent old death-trafficker; they ought to make her a Dame or a D. Litt."

Robert Barnard said of the characters that "Super-stockbrokerbelt setting, and quite exceptionally nasty family of suspects. (Christie usually prefers to keep most of her characters at least potentially sympathetic as well as potential murderers, but here they are only the latter)." He felt that the plot was "Something of a re-run of Hercule Poirot's Christmas (loathsome father, goody-goody son, ne'er-do-well son, gold-digger wife, etc.), but without its tight construction and ingenuity. And the rhyme is an irrelevancy." His bottom line on this novel was that "Still, a good, sour read."

== Poison ==
The aril, the fleshy part of the berry, is the only part of the yew that is non-toxic. The seeds inside the berry contain a high concentration of taxine and are poisonous if chewed. Pets that chew on yew branches or leaves have become ill.

== Adaptations ==
Secret of the Blackbirds (1983), a Soviet film adaptation, was unknown outside of the USSR due to multiple copyright issues.

A Pocket Full of Rye was the fourth transmitted story in the BBC series of Miss Marple adaptations, starring Joan Hickson as the elderly sleuth. It was first broadcast in two parts on 7 & 8 March 1985. Filming date is Autumn 1984. Michael Bakewell's 90-minute adaptation for BBC radio was first broadcast in 1995; it starred June Whitfield as Miss Marple.

The novel was adapted for the fourth season of the British television series Agatha Christie's Marple broadcast on ITV on 6 September 2009, starring Julia McKenzie as the title character.

== Publication history ==
The novel was first serialised, heavily abridged, in the UK in the Daily Express starting on Monday 28 September, running for fourteen instalments until Tuesday 13 October 1953.

The novel was first serialised in the US in the Chicago Tribune in forty-two parts from Monday, 11 January to Saturday, 27 February 1954.
