= Young Hickory (disambiguation) =

Young Hickory may refer to:

== People ==
- James K. Polk, 11th President of the United States, who was commonly referred to as "Young Hickory" during his political career.
- Franklin Pierce, 14th President of the United States, nicknamed "Young Hickory of the Granite Hills"

== Places ==
- Young Hickory Township, Fulton County, Illinois
- Young Hickory, Ohio

== See also ==
- Hickory (disambiguation)
- Old Hickory
