= Three Act Tragedy =

1934 mystery novel by Agatha Christie

- Dust-jacket illustration of the UK edition.
- Author: Agatha Christie
- Language: English
- Series: Hercule Poirot
- Genre: Crime novel, Theatre-fiction
- Publisher: Dodd, Mead (US); Collins Crime Club (UK)
- Publication date: October 1934 (Dodd, Mead), (US); January 1935 (Collins Crime Club), (UK)
- Publication place: United Kingdom; United States
- Media type: Print (hardback & paperback)
- Pages: 279 (first edition, hardback)
- ISBN: 0-00-615417-4
- Preceded by: Murder on the Orient Express
- Followed by: Death in the Clouds

Three Act Tragedy is a mystery novel by British writer Agatha Christie, first published in the United States by Dodd, Mead and Company in October 1934 under the title Murder in Three Acts and in the UK by the Collins Crime Club in January 1935 under Christie's original title. The US edition retailed at $2.00 and the UK edition at seven shillings and sixpence (7/6) (approximately equivalent to $48 in 2025 and approximately equivalent to £23 in 2025 respectively).

The book features Hercule Poirot, supported by his friend Mr Satterthwaite, and is the one book in which Satterthwaite collaborates with Poirot. Satterthwaite previously appeared in the stories featuring Harley Quin, in particular those collected in The Mysterious Mr Quin (1930). The novel was adapted for television twice, first in 1986 as Murder in Three Acts, and again in 2010 as Three Act Tragedy.

== Plot summary ==
Renowned stage actor Sir Charles Cartwright hosts a dinner party in Cornwall at his home. His guests include Hercule Poirot; psychiatrist Sir Bartholomew Strange; Hermione "Egg" Lytton Gore and her mother; Captain Dacres and his wife Cynthia; the playwright Muriel Wills; Egg's friend Oliver Manders; Mr Satterthwaite; and Reverend Babbington and his wife. When the Reverend Babbington suddenly dies after sipping one of the cocktails being served, Cartwright believes it was murder, though Strange finds no poison in his glass. Sometime later, Poirot is in Monte Carlo and hears the news from Satterthwaite and Cartwright that Strange died from nicotine poisoning after drinking a glass of port wine, despite there being no trace in the glass. Except for the three men, Strange's guests are the same ones who attended Cartwright's party. Both Satterthwaite and Cartwright return to England to investigate the murders. They learn that prior to the party, Strange had sent his usual butler away for two months and that he exhibited strange behaviour as if expecting something. A temporary replacement he hired named Ellis has since disappeared, with Satterthwaite and Cartwright finding drafted blackmail letters from Ellis in his room. Babbington's body is soon exhumed, showing he also died from nicotine poisoning.

Cartwright, Satterthwaite, and Egg investigate the deaths, and Poirot joins them as a consultant. Each guest has a possible motive or suspicious circumstances surrounding Strange's death but no connection to Babbington. When Wills is interviewed, she recalls noticing Manders drop a newspaper cutting on nicotine and that Ellis had a birthmark on one hand; she later disappears. Poirot stages a party where he demonstrates how the murderer substituted the poisoned glasses while everyone's attention was on the victim. He then receives a telegram from Mrs De Rushbridger, a patient at Strange's Yorkshire sanatorium, who arrived on the day Strange died. Poirot and Satterthwaite go to meet her but find that she has, in turn, been murdered. Learning that Cartwright's servant, Miss Milray, is hastily heading to Cornwall, Poirot follows her to find out why.

Upon his return, Poirot assembles Cartwright, Satterthwaite and Egg, eventually denouncing Cartwright as the killer. Cartwright wants to marry Egg but already has a wife who resides in a lunatic asylum. As he could not divorce her under British law, he decided to conceal this knowledge by murdering Dr Strange, his oldest friend and the only one who knew about the marriage. After his party, Cartwright persuaded Strange to let him assume the role of his butler as a joke and then poisoned him during his party. He planted the nicotine cutting on Manders after tricking him into being at Strange's home. He falsified Ellis's blackmail letters, then travelled to Monte Carlo the day after to establish his alibi. The first murder was a dress rehearsal for the second to test whether the glass could be switched unseen, and the victim was selected at random. The only safe guests were Cartwright, Strange, who disliked cocktails, and Egg, to whom Cartwright gave a safe glass. Cartwright used Mrs De Rushbridger as a red herring to distract from Strange's behaviour towards "Ellis", and he killed her to divert suspicion and prevent her from revealing her ignorance of the case.

Poirot reveals that the nicotine came from rose spray distilled by Cartwright at an old tower near his Cornwall residence; the equipment was found by him when Miss Milray went to destroy it. His suspicions about Cartwright were based on several facts: Cartwright was the most likely to have poisoned the cocktail, his passport showed his return to England to play Ellis; Miss Milray's actions were motivated by a secret love for her employer; Miss Wills spotted Cartwright's similarity to Ellis and was spirited away by Poirot to protect her; and the telegram supposedly from Mrs De Rushbridger was addressed to Poirot when she knew nothing of his involvement. Cartwright flees, but Poirot says that he will "choose his exit" of public trial or suicide.

(In certain American editions, Poirot tells Cartwright that doctors and policemen await him in the next room. Cartwright, unable to believe someone as important as himself has failed, tries to prove Poirot a liar and is arrested when he opens the door.)

The shocked Egg is picked up by Manders, whom she initially cared for before Cartwright appeared. In the aftermath, Satterthwaite remarks how terrible it was that anyone, himself included, could have drunk the poisoned cocktail. Poirot remarks there was an even more horrendous possibility: "It might have been me."

== Characters ==
- Hercule Poirot – Renowned Belgian detective. A friend of Sir Charles, involved in investigating the case after the murder of Dr Strange.
- Sir Charles Cartwright – Well-known stage actor, and the main "detective" in the investigations.
- Mr Satterthwaite – A sociable and observant man. Assists in initially investigating the case on Poirot's behalf.
- Reverend Babbington – First victim of the case. A local vicar in Cornwall, murdered during a cocktail party organised by Sir Charles.
- Dr Bartholomew Strange – Second victim of the case. Nerve specialist and long time friend of Sir Charles, and head of a sanitarium near his home in Yorkshire.
- Mrs De Rushbridger – Third victim of the case. Patient at Strange's sanatorium, recently arrived on the day Dr Strange is murdered.
- Hermione Lytton Gore – An attractive, young, single woman, known by the nickname of "Egg". Sir Charles's love interest, and one of his guests at his cocktail party.
- Lady Mary Lytton Gore – Mother of Hermione, and a guest at Sir Charles's cocktail party. She seeks a suitable husband for her daughter, and currently faces difficult financial circumstances.
- Captain Dacres – A gambler, and a guest at Sir Charles' cocktail party.
- Cynthia Dacres – Wife of Captain Dacres. A successful dressmaker, and a guest at Sir Charles's cocktail party.
- Angela Sutcliffe – A well-known actress, and a guest at Sir Charles' cocktail party.
- Mrs Babbington – Reverend Babbington's wife. One of the guests at Sir Charles's cocktail party.
- Muriel Wills – A playwright, also known as Anthony Astor. One of the guests at Sir Charles's cocktail party.
- Oliver Manders – A young financier, who is in love with Hermione. One of the guests at Sir Charles's cocktail party.
- Miss Milray – Long-time servant to Sir Charles.
- Ellis – Mysterious new butler at the home of Dr Strange. Disappears shortly after his employer's death.

== Literary significance and reception ==
The Times Literary Supplement of 31 January 1935 admitted that "Very few readers will guess the murderer before Hercule Poirot reveals the secret", but complained that the motive of the murderer "injures an otherwise very good story".

Isaac Anderson in The New York Times Book Review of 7 October 1934, said that the motive was "most unusual, if not positively unique in the annals of crime. Since this is an Agatha Christie novel featuring Hercule Poirot as its leading character, it is quite unnecessary to say that it makes uncommonly good reading".

In The Observer's issue of 6 January 1935, "Torquemada" (Edward Powys Mathers) said, "Her gift is pure genius, of leading the reader by the nose in a zigzag course up the garden and dropping the lead just when she wishes him to scamper to the kill. Three Act Tragedy is not among this author's best detective stories; but to say that it heads her second best is praise enough. The technique of misleadership is, as usual, superb; but, when all comes out, some of the minor threads of motive do not quite convince. Mrs Christie has, quite apart from her special gift, steadily improved and matured as a writer, from the-strange-affair-of-style to this charming and sophisticated piece of prose".

Milward Kennedy in The Guardian (29 January 1935) opened his review with, "The year has opened most satisfactorily. Mrs Christie's Three Act Tragedy is up to her best level"; he summarised the set-up of the plot but then added, "A weak (but perhaps inevitable point) is the disappearance of a butler; the reader, that is to say, is given rather too broad a hint. But the mechanics of the story are ingenious and plausible, the characters (as always with Mrs Christie) are life-like and lively. Poirot does not take the stage very often, but when he does he is in great form."

Robert Barnard commented much later that the "[s]trategy of deception here is one that by this date ought to have been familiar to Christie's readers. This is perhaps not one of the best examples of the trick, because few of the characters other than the murderer are well individualised. The social mix here is more artistic and sophisticated than is usual in Christie."

== References in other works ==
- Colonel Johnson alludes to the events of this story in part 3, section V of Hercule Poirot's Christmas.
- Poirot refers to the events of this novel in The A.B.C. Murders (1936) when he and Arthur Hastings reunite after not seeing each other for several years. Poirot is telling Hastings about his experiences since retiring. He relates that he was almost "exterminated" himself recently by a murderer who was "not so much enterprising as careless".

== References to other stories ==
- In Act 3 Chapter 5 Poirot says that once he had a failure in his professional career that happened in Belgium, hinting at the story "The Chocolate Box".
- In Act 2, Chapter 1 Poirot makes a hint to The Mysterious Affair at Styles while talking to Satterthwaite.
- In the end of Act 2 Chapter 3, Satterthwaite tells Sir Charles Cartwright that it is not the first time that he is investigating crimes. He is just starting to tell about the events of the story "At the 'Bells and Motley'" when Sir Charles interrupts him and starts to tell his own story.
- In Act 2, Chapter 1, Sir Charles Cartwright discusses reserving a compartment on the "Blue Train" in order to travel from France to England. This is the titular train from another Poirot mystery, The Mystery of the Blue Train, published in 1928.

== Publication history ==
Dustjacket illustration of the UK First Edition (1935)

- 1934, Dodd Mead and Company (New York), Hardback, 279 pp
- 1935, Collins Crime Club (London), January 1935, Hardback, 256 pp
- 1945, Avon Books (New York), Paperback, (Avon number 61), 230 pp
- 1957, Fontana Books (Imprint of HarperCollins), Paperback, 192 pp
- 1961, Popular Library (New York), Paperback, 175 pp
- 1964, Pan Books, Paperback (Pan number X275), 203 pp
- 1972, Greenway edition of collected works (William Collins), Hardcover, 253 pp, ISBN 0-00-231816-4
- 1973, Greenway edition of collected works (Dodd Mead), Hardcover, 253 pp
- 1975, Ulverscroft Large Print Edition, Hardcover, 351 pp, ISBN 0-85456-326-1
- 2006, Poirot Facsimile Edition (Facsimile of 1935 UK First Edition), HarperCollins, 6 November 2006, Hardback ISBN 0-00-723441-4

Two recent audiobook versions have been released.

- 2003, BBC Audiobooks released an unabridged reading by Andrew Sachs.
- 2012, HarperAudio released an unabridged reading by Hugh Fraser.

The novel's true first publication was the serialisation in the Saturday Evening Post in six instalments from 9 June (Volume 206, Number 50) to 14 July 1934 (Volume 207, Number 2) under the title Murder in Three Acts, with illustrations by John La Gatta. This novel is one of two to differ significantly in American editions (the other being The Moving Finger), both hardcover and paperback. The American edition of Three Act Tragedy changes the motive of the killer, but not so significantly as to require adjustment in other chapters of the novel.

In 1935 the novel became Christie's first title to sell 10,000 copies in its first year.

== Adaptations ==
=== Television ===
A 1986 television film was made under the title Murder in Three Acts, starring Peter Ustinov and Tony Curtis, which relocated the action to Acapulco, replaced the character of Satterthwaite with Hastings, and made Charles Cartwright an American movie star.

An adaptation starring David Suchet for Agatha Christie's Poirot was released as the first episode of Season 12 in 2010, with Martin Shaw as Sir Charles Cartwright, Art Malik as Sir Bartholomew Strange, Kimberley Nixon as Egg Lytton Gore, and Tom Wisdom as Oliver Manders. Ashley Pearce, who previously directed Appointment with Death and Mrs McGinty's Dead for the ITV series, also directed this. The adaptation omitted the character of Satterthwaite and changed a number of details but was generally faithful to the plot of the novel.

The novel was also adapted as a 2018 episode of the French television series Les Petits Meurtres d'Agatha Christie.

=== Radio ===
A radio production was made for BBC Radio 4 in 2002, starring John Moffatt as Poirot, Michael Cochrane as Sir Charles, George Cole as Satterthwaite, Beth Chalmers as Hermione Lytton Gore (Egg), the heroine, and Clive Merrison as Sir Bartholomew.

The production was broadcast across five weekly episodes on BBC Radio 4, and stays predominantly faithful to the novel, with only very subtle changes being made. Sir Charles travels to the South of France in order to get away from Egg, after initially believing she was in love with Oliver Manders, following a goodnight kiss between the two characters. At the end of the story, once Poirot has revealed the motive and the proof of the first wife, Sir Charles storms out of the room, in order to "choose his exit". It is implied he chooses the quicker option of suicide. A shaken and emotional Egg is then taken home by Manders, leaving Poirot and Satterthwaite to contemplate that they could have been the victims to the poison cocktail, at Sir Charles' party.
