= Hickory (disambiguation) =

Hickory is a type of tree (Carya species) found in North America and East Asia.

Hickory may also refer to:

== Places in the United States ==
- Hickory, Alabama, a place in Pickens County
- Hickory, Kentucky, a census-designated place
- Hickory, Louisiana, a place in St. Tammany Parish, Louisiana
- Hickory, Maryland, an unincorporated community
- Hickory, Mississippi, a town
- Hickory County, Missouri
- Hickory, North Carolina, a city
  - Hickory Motor Speedway
- Hickory, Oklahoma, a town
- Hickory, Pennsylvania, a census-designated place
- Hickory, Tennessee, a place in Sevier County, Tennessee
- Hickory, Virginia, an unincorporated community
- Hickory Creek (disambiguation)
- Hickory Mountain (disambiguation)
- Hickory Point Township, Macon County, Illinois
- Hickory Township (disambiguation)

== Other uses ==
- Hickory High School (disambiguation)
- USCGC Hickory (WLB-212), a United States Coast Guard seagoing buoy tender
- Hickory, childhood nickname of Mose Solomon (1900–1966), Major League Baseball player
- Hickory Records, a record label
- Hickory, a character played by Jack Haley in the 1939 film The Wizard of Oz
- Foxcliffe Hickory Wind or Hickory, a dog named Best in Show at the Westminster Kennel Club Dog Show in 2011
- Hickory cloth, a cotton twill used for North American workshirts and coveralls
- Hickory golf, a form of golf played with hickory-shafted golf clubs
- "Hickory", a song by Iron & Wine from the album Around the Well
- Hickory, an early name for Phil Collins's band Flaming Youth

== See also ==
- Old Hickory (disambiguation)
- The Hickories, Cazenovia, New York, a house on the US National Register of Historic Places
