= Miss Marple (radio series) =

BBC Radio adaptation of Agatha Christie's Miss Marple novels

- June Whitfield as Jane Marple
- Genre: Radio drama
- Country of origin: United Kingdom
- Home station: BBC Radio 4
- Starring: June Whitfield
- Written by: Michael Bakewell (1993–2001); Joy Wilkinson (2015); Adapted from the works of Agatha Christie
- Directed by: Enyd Williams (1993–2001); Gemma Jenkins (2015)
- Original release: 26 December 1993 – 30 September 2015

Miss Marple is a series of full cast BBC Radio drama adaptations of Agatha Christie's Miss Marple stories. The original series consisted of adaptations of all twelve Miss Marple novels, dramatised by Michael Bakewell and directed by Enyd Williams. They were broadcast on BBC Radio 4 between 1993 and 2001 and starred June Whitfield as Miss Marple.

Subsequently, adaptations of three Miss Marple short stories (again starring Whitfield) were broadcast under the collective title Miss Marple's Final Cases weekly 16–30 September 2015. These were adapted by Joy Wilkinson and directed by Gemma Jenkins.

== List of adaptations ==
No.	Title	First broadcast	Series
1	The Murder at the Vicarage	26–30 December 1993 (5 episodes)	—N/a
2	A Pocket Full of Rye	11 February 1995	Saturday Playhouse
3	At Bertram's Hotel	25–29 December 1995 (5 episodes)	—N/a
4	4:50 from Paddington	29 March 1997	Saturday Playhouse
5	A Caribbean Mystery	30 October – 27 November 1997 (5 episodes)	—N/a
6	The Mirror Crack'd from Side to Side	29 August 1998	—N/a
7	Nemesis	9 November – 7 December 1998 (5 episodes)	—N/a
8	The Body in the Library	22 May 1999	The Saturday Play
9	A Murder Is Announced	9 August – 6 September 1999 (5 episodes)	—N/a
10	The Moving Finger	5 May 2001	The Saturday Play
11	They Do It with Mirrors	23 July 2001 – 20 August 2001 (5 episodes)	—N/a
12	Sleeping Murder	8 December 2001	The Saturday Play
13	"Tape-Measure Murder"	16 September 2015	Miss Marple's Final Cases
14	"The Case of the Perfect Maid"	23 September 2015	Miss Marple's Final Cases
15	"Sanctuary"	30 September 2015	Miss Marple's Final Cases

== See also ==
- Hercule Poirot (radio series)
- Lord Peter Wimsey (radio series)
- Sherlock Holmes (1989 radio series)
