= Hickory Ridge Township =

Hickory Ridge Township may refer to one of the following places in the United States:

- Hickory Ridge Township, Cross County, Arkansas
- Hickory Ridge Township, Phillips County, Arkansas
- Hickory Ridge Township, Okfuskee County, Oklahoma

See also

- Hickory Township (disambiguation)
