= Secret of the Blackbirds =

- Russian: Тайна «Чёрных дроздов»
- Directed by: Vadim Derbenyov
- Written by: Valentina Kolodyazhnaya; Yelizaveta Smirnova
- Based on: A Pocket Full of Rye by Agatha Christie
- Starring: Ita Ever; Vladimir Sedov; Vsevolod Sanaev; Lyubov Polishchuk; Yury Belyayev
- Cinematography: Nikolay Nemolyaev
- Music by: Viktor Babushkin
- Release date: 1983
- Country: Soviet Union
- Language: Russian

Secret of the Blackbirds (Russian: Тайна «Чёрных дроздов») is a 1983 Soviet crime film directed by Vadim Derbenyov. The plot is based on Agatha Christie's novel A Pocket Full of Rye.

== Plot ==
The head of a wealthy family, Mr. George Fortescue, has been poisoned. Inspector Neal is investigating and learns that the deceased was an unpleasant person. His death was beneficial to all members of the family. It is not an easy matter, the rarest poison was used for poisoning. The violent death of the maid Gladys, and later the mistress of the house, Adele, completely confuses the investigation. But Miss Marple intervenes.

== Cast ==
- Ita Ever as Miss Marple
- Vladimir Sedov as Inspector Neele
- Vsevolod Sanaev as George Fortescue
- Lyubov Polishchuk as Adele Fortescue
- Yury Belyayev as Percival Fortescue (as Yuriy Belyaev)
- Elena Sanaeva as Jennifer Fortescue
- Andrey Kharitonov as Lancelot Fortescue
- Natalya Danilova as Patricia Fortescue
- Yelena Ivochkina as Elaine Fortescue
- Elza Radzina as Miss Effie Ramsbottom
- Irina Mazurkevich as Gladys Martin

== See also ==
A Pocket Full of Rye
