= Hercule Poirot (British radio series) =

BBC Radio adaptation of Agatha Christie's Poirot stories (1985–2007)

- John Moffatt as Hercule Poirot
- Genre: Radio drama
- Country of origin: United Kingdom
- Home station: BBC Radio 4
- Starring: John Moffatt
- Written by: Michael Bakewell; Adapted from the works of Agatha Christie
- Directed by: Enyd Williams
- Original release: 29 December 1985 – 27 August 2007

Hercule Poirot (UK: /ˈɛərkjuːl ˈpwɑːroʊ/, US: /hɜːrˈkjuːl pwɑːˈroʊ/) is a series of full cast BBC Radio drama adaptations of Agatha Christie's Hercule Poirot novels and short stories adapted by Michael Bakewell, broadcast on BBC Radio 4 between 1985 and 2007. With the exception of the first two adaptations, the series stars John Moffatt as Poirot.

== Production ==
The series consists of 27 full cast radio adaptations of Agatha Christie's Hercule Poirot stories, adapted by Michael Bakewell and broadcast on BBC Radio 4.

After the first adaptation, the six episode The Mystery of the Blue Train of 1985 (directed by David Johnston), all following productions were directed and produced by Enyd Williams. For Williams's first production, Hercule Poirot's Christmas, Peter Sallis played Poirot, but she recalled in The Radio Detectives that "I enjoyed very much working with Peter Sallis...but he's not a very happy person doing accents so we decided to leave it there." She subsequently cast John Moffatt, a member of the Radio Drama Company, in the role and he reprised the part for a further 25 productions between 1987 and 2007.

Adaptations in the series were released on CD and are regularly rebroadcast on BBC Radio 4 Extra. According to a press release in December 2020, Hercule Poirot episodes are one of the most requested programmes on BBC Sounds alongside Miss Marple. The major omission from the series was the final Poirot novel - Curtain: Poirot’s Last Case - for which the rights proved unattainable.

== Cast ==
The main character, private detective Hercule Poirot, appears in each production and was played by John Moffatt in all the dramatisations except the first two, in which he was played by Maurice Denham and Peter Sallis respectively.

Captain Hastings, Poirot's companion in several stories, was played by Simon Williams in Lord Edgware Dies, The ABC Murders, Peril at End House, The Mysterious Affair at Styles, and Dumb Witness, and Jeremy Clyde in Murder on the Links. Police detective Inspector Japp was played by Philip Jackson (reprising his role from the TV series Agatha Christie's Poirot) in The ABC Murders, Death In The Clouds, One, Two, Buckle My Shoe, and The Mysterious Affair at Styles, Norman Jones in Lord Edgware Dies, and Bryan Pringle in Peril at End House.

Crime fiction writer Ariadne Oliver was played by Stephanie Cole in Hallowe'en Party and Cards on the Table, and Julia McKenzie in Elephants Can Remember, Mrs McGinty's Dead, and Dead Man's Folly. Colonel Race, a British intelligence agent, was played by Donald Sinden in Death on the Nile and Cards on the Table.

Multiple actors played different characters in separate adaptations. For instance, Donald Sinden, who played Colonel Race, also played Colonel Lacey in The Adventure of the Christmas Pudding. Two other examples are Mary Wimbush, who played Mrs Lorrimer in Cards on the Table and Mrs Leadbetter in Taken at the Flood, and Michael Cochrane, who played Sir Charles Cartwright in Three Act Tragedy and Sir George Stubbs in Dead Man's Folly.

== List of adaptations ==
No.	Title	First broadcast	Notes
1	The Mystery of the Blue Train	29 December 1985	6 episodes starring Maurice Denham as Poirot, directed by David Johnston.
2	Hercule Poirot's Christmas	24 December 1986	Part of a "Murder for Christmas" strand, starring Peter Sallis as Poirot, directed by Enyd Williams.
3	The Murder of Roger Ackroyd	24 December 1987	Part of a "Crime at Christmas" strand, with John Moffatt as Poirot, who played the role for all future episodes.
4	Murder on the Links	15 September 1990	Saturday Night Theatre
5	Lord Edgware Dies (a.k.a. Thirteen at Dinner)	18 March 1992	5 episodes
6	Sad Cypress	14 May 1992	5 episodes
7	Murder on the Orient Express	28 December 1992	5 episodes
8	Hallowe'en Party	30 October 1993	Saturday Night Theatre
9	Five Little Pigs	18 June 1994	Saturday Night Theatre
10	Murder in Mesopotamia	26 December 1994	5 episodes
11	Death on the Nile	2 January 1997	5 episodes
12	Evil Under the Sun	6 April 1998	5 episodes
13	After the Funeral	28 August 1999	The Saturday Play
14	The A.B.C. Murders	22 April 2000	The Saturday Play
15	Peril at End House	20 November 2000	5 episodes
16	Appointment with Death	25 August 2001	The Saturday Play
17	Cards on the Table	4 May 2002	The Saturday Play
18	Three Act Tragedy	8 July 2002	5 episodes
19	Death in the Clouds	3 May 2003	The Saturday Play
20	Taken at the Flood	13 October 2003	5 episodes
21	One, Two, Buckle My Shoe	30 August 2004	5 episodes
22	The Adventure of the Christmas Pudding	24 December 2004	Afternoon Play
23	The Mysterious Affair at Styles	5 September 2005	5 episodes
24	Elephants Can Remember	7 January 2006	The Saturday Play
25	Mrs. McGinty's Dead	3 March 2006	5 episodes
26	Dumb Witness	7 December 2006	Afternoon Play, 2 episodes
27	Dead Man's Folly	6 August 2007	4 episodes

== Reception ==
The Sunday Times wrote in 2004 that "Radio 4...relies on the same clever but unpublicised creative trio it has had since the 1980s: John Moffatt, who plays Poirot with such finesse, Michael Bakewell, who adapts the stories with clarify and affection; and Enyd Williams, the producer and director." Moffatt's portrayal of Hercule Poirot is cited in his obituaries as the definitive radio portrayal of the character.

== See also ==
- Miss Marple (radio series)
- Lord Peter Wimsey (radio series)
- Sherlock Holmes (1989 radio series)
