= Hickory Mountain =

Hickory Mountain may refer to the following places in the United States:

- Hickory Mountain, a township in Chatham County, North Carolina

== See also ==
- Hickory (disambiguation)
