= Hickory High School =

Hickory High School may refer to:

- Hickory High School (North Carolina) — Hickory, North Carolina
- Hickory High School (Pennsylvania) — Hermitage, Pennsylvania
- Hickory High School (Virginia) — Chesapeake, Virginia
- the fictitious Indiana high school featured in the 1986 movie Hoosiers
