= Hercule Poirot's Christmas =

1938 mystery novel by Agatha Christie

- First UK edition
- Author: Agatha Christie
- Cover artist: Not known
- Language: English
- Series: Hercule Poirot
- Genre: Detective fiction
- Publisher: Collins Crime Club
- Publication date: 19 December 1938
- Publication place: United Kingdom
- Media type: Print (hardback & paperback)
- Pages: 256 first edition, hardback
- Preceded by: Appointment with Death
- Followed by: Sad Cypress

Hercule Poirot's Christmas is a mystery novel by the English writer Agatha Christie, first published in the UK by the Collins Crime Club on 19 December 1938 (although the first edition is copyright dated 1939). It retailed at seven shillings and sixpence (7/6).

It was published in the US by Dodd, Mead and Company in February 1939 under the title of Murder for Christmas. This edition retailed at $2.00. A paperback edition in the US by Avon books in 1947 changed the title again to A Holiday for Murder. The book features the Belgian detective Hercule Poirot and is a locked room mystery. The premise is a family reuniting for Christmas, and they find the host of the gathering murdered in a private room.

== Plot summary ==
Multi-millionaire Simeon Lee, frail in his old age, unexpectedly invites his family to gather at his home for Christmas. The gesture is met with suspicion by the guests. Simeon is not given to warm family sentiment, and the family are not on good terms, particularly with the black sheep of the family, Harry. Simeon also searched out his orphaned, Spanish-born granddaughter, Pilar Estravados, and has invited her to live in his house. None of the siblings has met their late sister Jennifer's daughter before; she proves to be delightful.

Simeon is intent on playing a cruel game with his family's emotions. Stephen Farr, a surprise guest, arrives on Christmas Eve. He is the son of Simeon's former partner in the diamond mines, welcomed warmly by Simeon. Simeon calls his family together that afternoon, to hear him on the telephone with his attorney, saying he wants to update his will after Christmas. This incomplete information stirs up negative feelings among his sons and their wives.

After dinner on Christmas Eve, the sounds of crashing furniture and a hideous scream are heard by several people, who rush to Simeon's room. When they get to his door, they find it locked and have to break it down. The sight revealed includes heavy furniture overturned, crockery smashed, and Simeon dead, his throat slit, in a great pool of blood, a grisly and shocking sight. The local police superintendent is already at the front door, before anyone could call the police. Superintendent Sugden notices Pilar pick up something from the floor. He insists that she give the small bit of rubber and a small object made of wood to him.

Sugden explains that he is at the house by prior arrangement with the victim, who confided to him the theft of a substantial quantity of uncut diamonds from his safe. Poirot accompanies Colonel Johnson to investigate this murder. The murder generates many questions. How was the victim killed inside a locked room? Was the murder connected to the theft of the diamonds? And what is the significance of the small triangle of rubber and the peg first noticed by Pilar?

Poirot's investigation explores the victim's methodical and vengeful nature and the way these characteristics come out in his sons, and observes physical traits as well. Each son, and perhaps one of the wives, appears as a suspect to the investigators. When the butler mentions his confusion about the identities of the house guests, Poirot realises that the four sons of Simeon's marriage may not be Simeon's only sons present in the home. Poirot finds the uncut diamonds mixed in with the stones of a decorative outdoor garden, which takes theft away as a motive. The family lawyer reads Simeon's will, which leaves half to son Alfred, who runs the business, and the other half to be split among his other children. This leaves Pilar with nothing, as her mother died a year earlier, and his granddaughter is not specifically named. Alfred, David and Harry agree to pool their inheritances and make a share for Pilar. This warm gesture, based on what is just, as Lydia tells her, upsets Pilar, and she refuses it. The final major clue comes from Pilar. She and Stephen are playing with balloons and one bursts; she mentions that the pieces are like what she found on the floor after Simeon was killed. Poirot warns her to be "on her guard", as she knows more than she realises. Soon she is almost killed by a stone cannonball balanced on top of her bedroom door.

A cable comes from South Africa reporting that the son of Simeon's partner was dead; Stephen Farr admits his name is Stephen Grant, and he is in England to meet his father, from Simeon's last trip to South Africa, five years after his marriage in England. After that, Pilar also reveals she is an impostor: the real Pilar was killed by a bomb as the two crossed Spain during its civil war, and she decided to go to England in the other woman's place as an adventure. Being offered the share of the will went too far, hence her refusal. With this knowledge, Sugden tries to blame the murder on Pilar.

Then Poirot takes over and explains the crime. Poirot reveals that Sugden was another illegitimate child of Simeon, from an affair with a local girl. Simeon had paid her off and left her, but Sugden came to resent the abandonment. He had planned his revenge carefully and murdered Simeon hours before. He then arranged multiple pieces of furniture and other items so they would collapse when pulled with a string from outside the house, along with a carnival toy that would produce a screaming sound when popped—the bit of rubber that Pilar found. This would make it sound as though the murder had just happened. Poirot deduced the relationship between Simeon and Sugden by noticing the shared mannerisms of Harry, Stephen, and Sugden, and also by placing a fake mustache on a portrait of a young Simeon and noting the resemblance to Sugden.

David is relieved of his years of anger toward his father for mistreating his mother. Stephen takes Pilar, actually Conchita Lopez, to South Africa, to marry her. Lydia will invite them to a proper English Christmas. Alfred and Lydia plan to sell off their old house to forget about the horrible murder. Alfred offers his legitimate brother David his mother's furniture, but David politely refuses. Harry, David, and George depart one by one. Alfred and Lydia are a little sorry to leave Lydia's miniature gardens created in stone sinks. Lydia plans another miniature garden she will make in the future. Alfred wholeheartedly thanks his wife for serving him, but Lydia says that it was her duty as a wife.

The story ends with a conversation between Poirot and Colonel Johnson, Chief Constable of the county, by a wood fire. Poirot declares that he much prefers central heating.

== Characters ==
- Hercule Poirot, the Belgian detective
- Colonel Johnson, Chief Constable
- Superintendent Sugden, the investigating police officer
- Simeon Lee, an old millionaire
- Alfred Lee, Simeon's son, who lives with his father
- Lydia Lee, Alfred's wife
- George Lee, Simeon's son and an MP
- Magdalene Lee, George's wife
- David Lee, Simeon's son, the artist
- Hilda Lee, David's wife
- Harry Lee, Simeon's son, called the prodigal son
- "Pilar Estravados", Simeon's only granddaughter, really Conchita Lopez
- "Stephen Farr", son of Simeon's former business partner, really Stephen Grant
- Horbury, Simeon's valet
- Tressilian, the butler
- Walter, the footman

== Major themes ==
Like Appointment with Death (1938) before it, this is a novel in which the parent/victim was a sadistic tyrant, whose nature leads directly to his/her murder. This theme arises in later Christie works, such as Crooked House (1949) and Ordeal by Innocence (1958).

In some editions, the novel is headed by an epigraph from Macbeth that appears repeatedly in the novel itself: "Yet who would have thought the old man to have had so much blood in him?", a statement made by Simeon Lee's daughter-in-law, Lydia, after Simeon's corpse is found by his family.

== Literary significance and reception ==
In The New York Times Book Review of 12 February 1939, Isaac Anderson concluded, "Poirot has solved some puzzling mysteries in his time, but never has his mighty brain functioned more brilliantly than in Murder for Christmas".

In The Observer of 18 December 1938, "Torquemada" (Edward Powys Mathers) finished his review by stating defensively, "'Is Hercule Poirot's Christmas' a major Christie? I think it is, and that in spite of a piece of quite irrelevant tortuosity in the matter of the bewitching Pilar Estravados, and in spite of the fact that the business of the appalling shriek will probably make no mystery for the average reader. The main thing, is, surely that Agatha Christie once more abandonedly dangles the murderer before our eyes and successfully defies us to see him. I am sure that some purists will reverse my decision on the ground that the author to get her effect, has broken what they consider to be one of the major rules of detective writing; but I hold that in a Poirot tale it should be a case of caveat lector, and that the rules were not made for Agatha Christie."

E R Punshon of The Guardian, in his 13 January 1939 review wrote that Poirot, "by careful and acute reasoning is able to show that a convincing case can be made out against all the members of the family till the baffled reader is ready to believe them all guilty in turn and till Poirot in one of his famous confrontation scenes indicates who is, in fact, the culprit. In this kind of detective novel, depending almost entirely for its interest on accuracy of logical deduction from recorded fact and yet with the drama played out by recognisable human beings, Mrs Christie remains supreme. One may grumble…that she depends a little too much upon coincidence and manufactured effect…but how small are such blemishes compared with the brilliance of the whole conception!"

Maurice Percy Ashley in the Times Literary Supplement (17 December 1938) had a complaint to make after summarising the plot: "Mrs Christie's detective stories tend to follow a pattern. First, there is always a group of suspects each of whom has something to conceal about his or her past; second, there is a generous use of coincidence in the circumstances of the crime; third, there is a concession to sentiment which does not necessarily simplify the solution. Mrs Christie makes one departure here from her recent practice, as she explains in her dedicatory foreword. The complaint had been uttered that her murders were getting too refined – anaemic, in fact. So this is 'a good violent murder with lots of blood.' But there is, on the other hand, another departure from Mrs Christie's earlier stories which must be regretted. M. Poirot in his retirement is becoming too much of a colourless expert. One feels a nostalgic longing for the days when he baited his 'good friend' and butt, Hastings, when he spoke malaprop English and astonished strangers by his intellectual arrogance."

Robert Barnard summarized the novel as a "Welcome interruption to the festive season as mischievous old patriarch, tyrant and sinner gets his desserts". His judgment of the novel was stated in two words: "Magnificently clued."

== References to other works ==
The character of Colonel Johnson previously appeared in Three Act Tragedy (1935) and he mentions that case in Part 3, section v of this novel.

== Publication history ==
- 1938, Collins Crime Club (London), 19 December 1938, Hardback, 256 pp
- 1939, Dodd Mead and Company (New York), (under the title Murder for Christmas, February 1939, Hardback, 272 pp
- 1947, Avon Books, Paperback, Avon number 124, under the title A Holiday For Murder, 255 pp
- 1957, Fontana Books (Imprint of HarperCollins), Paperback, 189 pp
- 1962, Bantam Books, Paperback, 167 pp
- 1967, Pan Books, Paperback, 204 pp
- 1972, Fontana Books, Paperback, 189 pp
- 1973, Greenway edition of collected works (William Collins), Hardcover, 253 pp ISBN 0-00-231309-X
- 1974, Greenway edition of collected works (Dodd Mead), Hardcover, 253 pp
- 1985, W. Clement Stone, P M A Communications, Hardback, ISBN 0-396-06963-0
- 1987, Ulverscroft Large-print Edition, Hardcover
- 2000, Berkley Books (New York), 2000, Paperback, ISBN 0-425-17741-6
- 2006, Poirot Facsimile Edition (Facsimile of 1938 UK First Edition), HarperCollins, 6 November 2006, Hardback, ISBN 0-00-723450-3

The book was first serialised in the US in Collier's Weekly in ten parts from 12 November 1938 (Volume 102, Number 20) to 14 January 1939 (Volume 103, Number 2) under the title Murder For Christmas with illustrations by Mario Cooper.

The UK serialisation was in twenty parts in the Daily Express from Monday, 14 November to Saturday, 10 December 1938 under the title of Murder at Christmas. Most of the instalments carried an uncredited illustration. This version did not contain any chapter divisions.

== Adaptations ==
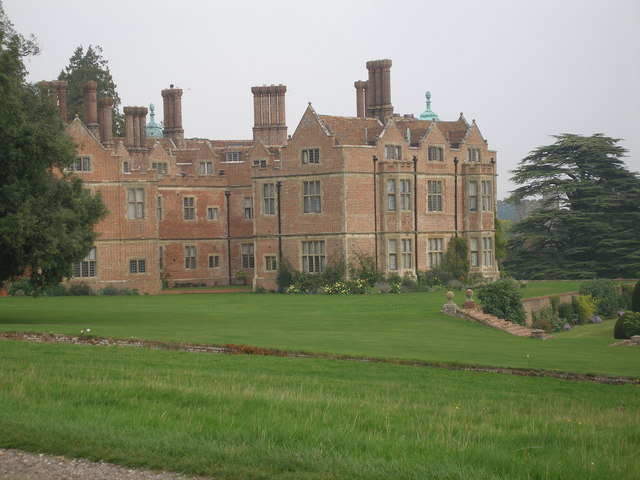
Chilham Castle was used as Gorston Hall.

=== Television ===
==== 1994 British adaptation ====
The story was adapted for television in 1994 in a special episode of Agatha Christie's Poirot starring David Suchet as Hercule Poirot, first aired (in the UK) on 25 December 1994. The adaptation is generally faithful to the novel, although some characters have been left out. Chief Constable Colonel Johnson, who features in the novel, is replaced in the television adaptation by regular Poirot character Chief Inspector Japp. Stephen Farr is also missing, and his romantic interest in Pilar is given to Harry. Sugden's mother in this adaptation comes from South Africa. Hilda and David Lee do not appear in the adaptation. The exterior scenes were filmed in Chilham, Kent and Chilham Castle was used as Gorston Hall. A small backstory is given explaining Poirot's reluctance to go, due to the fact that he stays at home at Christmas and prefers central heating. But his radiator has given out and the attendants at Whitehaven Mansions won't repair it until after Christmas. Before he leaves, he asked Simeon Lee if they have central heating.

==== 2006 French adaptation ====
The story was also adapted for the French television in a four-parts series entitled Petits Meurtres en famille, broadcast by France 2 in 2006 and 2009, with the notable replacement of Poirot by a duet of newly created characters, both of whom have nothing to do with Poirot. On top of that, none of the characters match their names from those that are in the novel. The plot is only vaguely adapted, with great expansion to the novel and change to its characters. Nevertheless, Mathew Prichard himself, grandson of Agatha Christie, was quoted by Télérama as calling it the best TV adaptation he had seen.

==== 2018 French adaptation ====
The novel was adapted as a 2018 episode of the French television series Les Petits Meurtres d'Agatha Christie. In this version there is no Christmas theme, and Poirot doesn't appear.

=== Radio ===
Hercule Poirot's Christmas was adapted for radio by BBC Radio 4, featuring Peter Sallis as Poirot. This was the second adaptation of a Poirot story for radio, aired 24 December 1986.

=== Murder on the Orient Express (2017) ===
The character of Pilar Estravados was repurposed in Kenneth Branagh's film adaptation of Murder on the Orient Express, replacing Greta Ohlsson. She was played by Penélope Cruz.

== See also ==
- List of Christmas-themed literature
