= Hickory Township =

Hickory Township may refer to:

- Hickory Township, Carroll County, Arkansas
- Hickory Township, Schuyler County, Illinois
- Hickory Township, Butler County, Kansas
- Hickory Township, Pennington County, Minnesota
- Hickory Township, Holt County, Missouri
- Hickory Township, Catawba County, North Carolina, in Catawba County, North Carolina
- Hickory Township, Forest County, Pennsylvania
- Hickory Township, Lawrence County, Pennsylvania
- Hickory Township, Mercer County, now the city of Hermitage, Pennsylvania
