= Old Hickory =

Old Hickory may refer to:

== Nickname ==
- Andrew Jackson (1767–1845), seventh president of the United States
- 30th Infantry Division (United States) a unit of the Army National Guard in World Wars I and II

== Places ==
- Old Hickory (LaCour, Louisiana), on the National Register of Historic Places listings in Louisiana
- Old Hickory Historic District, on the National Register of Historic Places listings in Tennessee
- Old Hickory, Tennessee, a town named for Jackson, near to the site of The Hermitage
- Old Hickory Boulevard, the name of several roads in Nashville, Tennessee, named for Jackson
- Old Hickory Lake, a man-made reservoir along the path of the Cumberland River in Middle Tennessee, named for Jackson
  - Old Hickory Lake Arboretum, an environmental study area adjacent to Old Hickory Lake in Tennessee
  - Old Hickory Lock and Dam, the lock and dam which hold Old Hickory Lake in Tennessee
- Old Hickory Mall, an enclosed shopping mall in Jackson, Tennessee
- Old Hickory Square, a square in Kerkrade, the Netherlands.

== Other ==
- Old Hickory (band), see Kenny Woods
