= Hickory Dickory Dock (novel) =

1955 Poirot novel by Agatha Christie

- Dust-jacket illustration of the first UK edition
- Author: Agatha Christie
- Cover artist: William Randall
- Language: English
- Series: Hercule Poirot
- Genre: Crime novel
- Publisher: Collins Crime Club
- Publication date: 31 October 1955
- Publication place: United Kingdom
- Media type: Print (hardback & paperback)
- Pages: 192 (first edition, hardback)
- Preceded by: After the Funeral
- Followed by: Dead Man's Folly

Hickory Dickory Dock is a work of detective fiction by the English writer Agatha Christie and first published in the UK by the Collins Crime Club on 31 October 1955 and in the US by Dodd, Mead and Company in November of the same year under the title of Hickory Dickory Death. The UK edition retailed at ten shillings and sixpence (10/6) and the US edition at $3.00. It features her Belgian detective Hercule Poirot. The novel is notable for featuring Poirot's efficient secretary, Miss Felicity Lemon, who had previously appeared only in the Poirot short stories.

This novel is set at a student hostel on Hickory Road, where Miss Lemon's sister Mrs Hubbard is the warden. Poirot attempts to discover the reason for a sudden spate of petty thefts and vandalism, as he suspects there is a darker aspect to the happenings at Hickory Road; these suspicions are confirmed when three people are murdered.

== Plot summary ==
An outbreak of apparent kleptomania at Mrs Nicoletis' student hostel arouses Hercule Poirot's interest when he sees the bizarre list of stolen or vandalized items; a shoe, a stethoscope, a bracelet, a powder compact, a cookbook, some lightbulbs, some old flannel trousers, a box of chocolates, a rucksack, a silk scarf, some boracic powder, some green ink, and a diamond ring (later found in a bowl of soup). He congratulates the warden, Mrs Hubbard, on a 'unique and beautiful problem'.

When Poirot meets with the students and threatens to call in the police, Celia Austin quickly admits she is the primary thief. She denies, however, the following: stealing Nigel Chapman's green ink and using it to deface Elizabeth Johnston's study notes; taking Len Bateson's stethoscope, Chandra Lal's boracic powder, and the hallway light bulbs; and cutting up and concealing Len's rucksack. She committed the lesser crimes to attract the attention of Colin McNabb, a psychology student. This ploy succeeds - McNabb proposes marriage to Celia, who makes restitution for her crimes and hints that she knows who committed the others. Celia is discovered dead the following morning from an overdose of morphine tartrate; though the scene is staged as a suicide, investigators quickly rule it a homicide.

Inspector Sharpe interviews the inhabitants of the hostel. Nigel Chapman admits that he acquired the morphine tartrate as part of a bet to steal three deadly poisons without being caught (the other two being digitalin and hyoscine hydrobromide); he is also the one who stole Len's stethoscope, to disguise himself as a doctor and gain access to a hospital dispensary. He claims all the poisons were either burned or flushed down the toilet, but it is just possible someone managed to extract some morphine before this was done. Poirot turns his attention to the reappearance of the diamond ring, and confronts Valerie Hobhouse, in whose soup the ring was found. Valerie admits that she is the one who suggested the scheme of the thefts to Celia; however, Celia was only supposed to steal or destroy worthless items. Realizing Celia had accidentally stolen something valuable, Valerie took the ring from Celia, secretly swapped the diamond for a zircon to pay off some gambling debts, and staged the return of the ring.

Mrs Nicoletis begins behaving very nervously, and someone poisons her brandy to keep her quiet. Poirot focuses his attention now on the cutting up of the rucksack. By careful study of the rucksack's design, he identifies an unusual corrugated base, and suggests to the police that the rucksack is part of an international smuggling operation. The rucksacks were sold to innocent students, and then used to transport drugs and gems. Mrs Nicoletis had been bankrolling the organisation, but was not the brain behind it.

Patricia Lane comes to Nigel and admits that she took the morphine from the bottle in his drawer, and substituted bicarbonate of soda for it. Now the bicarbonate bottle with the morphine has been stolen from her own room. She also mentions that she intends to write to Nigel's dying father to reconcile the two, but Nigel tries to dissuade her, claiming that he has legally changed his last name and estranged himself from his father because his father secretly poisoned his mother with Medinal. Nigel goes to Inspector Sharpe and tells him about the missing morphine, but while he is there, Patricia telephones to say that she has discovered something further. When Sharpe and Nigel return to the hostel, they find Patricia has been bludgeoned to death.

West African student Akibombo reveals that he had taken Patricia's bicarbonate bottle to ease a stomach complaint; when he took a teaspoonful of the contents, however, he became very ill and later discovered that the white powder was in fact boracic powder. Therefore, by the time Patricia had substituted the bicarbonate, the morphine had already been substituted for Chandra Lal's stolen boracic powder. Poirot begins to suspect Valerie Hobhouse's real reason for convincing Celia to steal things is that she is in on the smuggling, and wished the destruction of the rucksack to be thought one of a series of unimportant crimes. A police raid on a dress shop that Valerie works for proves Poirot is right.

Poirot reveals that Nigel Chapman is the murderer, and the brains behind the smuggling operation. Celia Austen had happened to see him destroying the incriminating rucksack, and also, like Patricia, knew his real identity. Chapman killed Mrs Nicoletis when she showed signs of cowardice, and killed Patricia to keep her from contacting his father, Sir Arthur Stanley. Sir Arthur had discovered, several years prior, that Nigel was the one who poisoned his mother with Medinal, as she had threatened to prosecute him for forging cheques in her name. Sir Arthur agreed not to prosecute Nigel, and to let his mother's death be thought an accident, provided Nigel change his name and start a new life. He forced Nigel to write a full confession; if Nigel was ever found to be involved in anything else criminal, the confession would be sent to the police, and Nigel would be arrested for his mother's murder. As Sir Arthur Stanley has recently died, Poirot gets the incriminating confession from Sir Arthur's solicitor, and Nigel is arrested. Valerie Hobhouse, revealed to be Mrs Nicoletis' daughter, admits she was forced to impersonate Patricia on the telephone to give Nigel an alibi; now that she is certain he is responsible for her mother's death, she is more than happy to incriminate him.

== Characters ==
- Hercule Poirot, the Belgian detective
- Inspector Sharpe, the investigating officer
- Miss Felicity Lemon, Poirot's secretary
- Mrs Christina Nicoletis, the part-Greek, dipsomaniac owner of the student hostel at Hickory Road
- Mrs Hubbard, Miss Lemon's sister and the warden of Hickory Road
- George, Poirot's valet
- Ahmed Ali, an Egyptian student residing at Hickory Road
- Akibombo, a West African student residing at Hickory Road
- Celia Austin, a resident in full-time employment at Hickory Road, chemist in the dispensary at St Catherines Hospital.
- Leonard "Len" Bateson, a student residing at Hickory Road, studying medicine and surgery
- Nigel Chapman, a student residing at Hickory Road, he has a diploma in Bronze Age and medieval history as well as Italian, and studies at the University of London
- Sally Finch, an American student residing at Hickory Road under the Fulbright Program, specializing in poetry, based on archaeologist Joan Oates
- René Halle, a French student residing at Hickory Road, studying English literature
- Valèrie Hobhouse, a resident at Hickory Road in full-time employment as co-owner of Sabrina Fair, a beauty parlour
- Elizabeth Johnston, a Jamaican student residing at Hickory Road, studying jurisprudence
- Chandra Lal, an Indian student residing at Hickory Road studying political science
- Patricia Lane, a student residing at Hickory Road with a diploma in archaeology
- Geneviève Maricaud, a French student residing at Hickory Road studying English literature
- Colin McNabb, a student residing at Hickory Road, doing post-graduate studies in psychology
- Gopal Ram, an Indian student residing at Hickory Road studying political science
- Jean Tomlinson, a resident at Hickory Road in full-time employment doing physical therapy at St Catherine's Hospital
- Maria, the Italian cook at Hickory Road
- Geronimo, Maria's husband, and the hostel manservant

== Explanation of the novel's title ==
The title is taken, as are other of Christie's titles, from a nursery rhyme: Hickory Dickory Dock. This is nevertheless one of her most tenuous links to the original nursery rhyme, consisting of little more than the name of a road and an allusion being "in the dock," i.e. on trial. (“‘Hickory, dickory, dock,’ said Nigel, ‘the mouse ran up the clock. The police said, “Boo,” I wonder who, will eventually stand in the Dock?’”).

== Literary significance and reception ==
Philip John Stead's review in the Times Literary Supplement of 23 December 1955 began: "Poirot's return to the happy hunting grounds of detective fiction is something of an event. He is called upon to solve the mystery of a series of apparently trivial thefts at a student's hostel but soon finds himself partnering the police in investigating murder. Mrs Christie rapidly establishes her favourite atmosphere by her skilful mixture of cheerfulness and suspense." After summarising the plot he concluded, "The amount of mischief going on in the hostel imposes some strain on the reader's patience as well as on Poirot's ingenuity; the author has been a little too liberal with the red herrings. Yet the thumb-nail sketches of the characters are as good as ever and in spite of the over-elaborate nature of the puzzle there is plenty of entertainment."

Robert Barnard: "A significant falling-off in standards in this mid-'fifties story. A highly perfunctory going-through-the-paces: the rhyme has no meaning within the story; the plot (drugs smuggled in imported haversacks) is unlikely in the extreme; and the attempt to widen the range of character types (Africans, Indians, students of Freud etc.) is far from successful. Evelyn Waugh's diary records that it 'began well' but deteriorated 'a third of the way through into twaddle' – a judgment which, unusually for him, erred on the side of charity."

== Television adaptations ==
British

A television adaptation, starring David Suchet as Poirot; Philip Jackson as Inspector Japp; Pauline Moran as Miss Lemon; Damian Lewis as Leonard Bateson; Sarah Badel as Mrs Hubbard; Elinor Morriston as Valerie Hobhouse and Jonathan Firth as Nigel Chapman, was broadcast in 1995 in the series Agatha Christie's Poirot. In common with the rest of the series, the setting is moved back in time from the post-World War II period of Christie's original novel to the 1930s. This results in an anachronism: the American student Sally Finch is said to be on a Fulbright scholarship, though the Fulbright Program was not founded until after the Second World War.

This adaptation differed from Christie's novel in that Sharpe is replaced with the recurring character of Inspector Japp, and a number of the students from the novel are left out, most notably Akibombo, Elizabeth Johnston, and Lal, who are students but neither English nor American. Other aspects omitted from the TV adaptation include the red herring of the green ink, the change of the motive for the murder of Celia, the theft of the poison being the only thing taken and the person who takes it (McNabb) and the smuggling involving only diamonds, the inclusion of a Custom and Excise Officer conducting an undercover operation, and the relationship between Valerie and Mrs Nicoletis.

French

The novel was also adapted as a 2015 episode of the French television series Les Petits Meurtres d'Agatha Christie.

== Publication history ==
- 1955, Collins Crime Club (London), 31 October 1955, Hardcover, 192 pp
- 1955, Dodd Mead and Company (New York), November 1955, Hardcover, 241 pp
- 1956, Pocket Books (New York), Paperback, 222 pp
- 1958, Fontana Books (Imprint of HarperCollins), Paperback, 192 pp
- 1967, Pan Books, Paperback, 189 pp
- 1987, Ulverscroft Large-print Edition, Hardcover, ISBN 0-7089-1637-6

In the UK the novel was first serialised in the weekly magazine John Bull in six abridged instalments from 28 May (Volume 97, Number 2552) to 2 July 1955 (Volume 98, Number 2557) with illustrations by "Fancett".

The novel was first serialised in the US in Collier's Weekly in three abridged instalments from 14 October (Volume 136, Number 8) to 11 November 1955 (Volume 136, Number 10) under the title Hickory Dickory Death with illustrations by Robert Fawcett.
