= John Moffatt (actor) =

English actor and playwright (1922–2012)

- Moffatt in the 1977 production of The Play's the Thing, by P. G. Wodehouse
- Born: Albert John Moffatt; 24 September 1922; Badby, Daventry, Northamptonshire, England
- Died: 10 September 2012 (aged 89); London, England
- Occupation: Actor
- Years active: 1944–2009

Albert John Moffatt (24 September 1922 – 10 September 2012) was an English character actor and playwright, known for his portrayal of Hercule Poirot on BBC Radio in twenty-five productions and for a wide range of stage roles in the West End from the 1950s to the 1980s.

Moffatt's parents wished him to follow a career in a bank, but Moffatt secretly studied acting and made his stage debut in 1944. After five years in provincial repertory theatre he made his first London appearance in 1959. In the early 1950s he was cast in small parts in productions headed by John Gielgud and Noël Coward, and achieved increasingly prominent roles over the next decade. He was a member of the English Stage Company, the Old Vic, and the National Theatre companies. His range was considerable, embracing the classics, new plays, revue and pantomime.

Moffatt began broadcasting on radio in 1950 and on television in 1953. His most enduring role was that of Agatha Christie's Belgian detective, Hercule Poirot, in a long sequence of radio adaptations of her novels, beginning in 1987 and continuing at intervals until 2007. In 1992/3, Moffat played M. Comeliau, the Examining Magistrate, in ITV's Maigret starring Michael Gambon. He was, perhaps, less well known as a film actor but took parts in twelve films between 1956 and 1987.

== Life and career ==
=== Early years ===
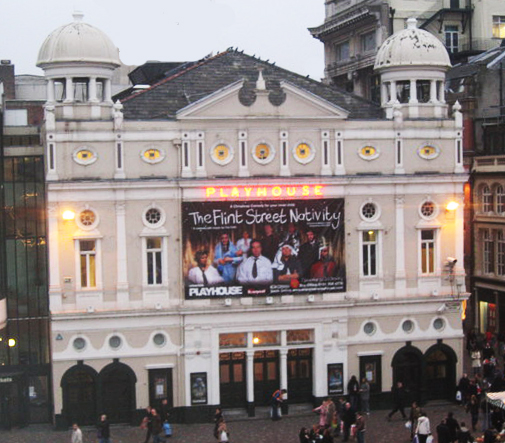
Liverpool Playhouse, where Moffatt made his debut

Moffatt was born in Badby, Daventry, Northamptonshire, the son of Ernest Moffatt and his wife Letitia, née Hickman, servants to Queen Alexandra at Marlborough House and Sandringham. He was educated at East Sheen County School in west London, after which he spent three years as a bank clerk in the City of London. In the evenings he attended drama classes given by John Burrell at Toynbee Hall. Moffatt kept the lessons secret from his parents, who considered the theatre too insecure a career.

He made his first stage appearance in 1944 at the Liverpool Playhouse, playing the Raven, in a touring production for children of The Snow Queen. He made his debut in regular theatre at the Perth Repertory in 1945, where his colleagues included Alec McCowen, with whom he established a lifelong friendship. Over the next five years he learnt his craft playing more than 200 parts in repertory companies at Oxford and Windsor, and the Bristol Old Vic. At Oxford he and the young Tony Hancock played Ugly Sisters together. Moffatt retained a fondness for pantomime; he became a celebrated Dame, and was the author of five pantomimes.

=== London ===
Moffatt made his first London appearance in 1950, as Loyale in Tartuffe at the Lyric, Hammersmith. At the same theatre played the sinister waiter in Anouilh's Point of Departure, with Dirk Bogarde, making his West End debut when the production transferred to the Duke of York's. In 1951 he made his first appearance in revue, in Late Night Extra.

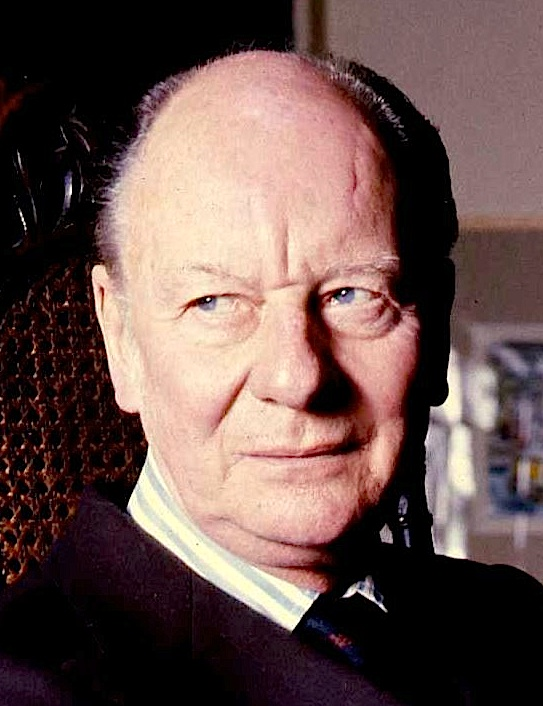
John Gielgud

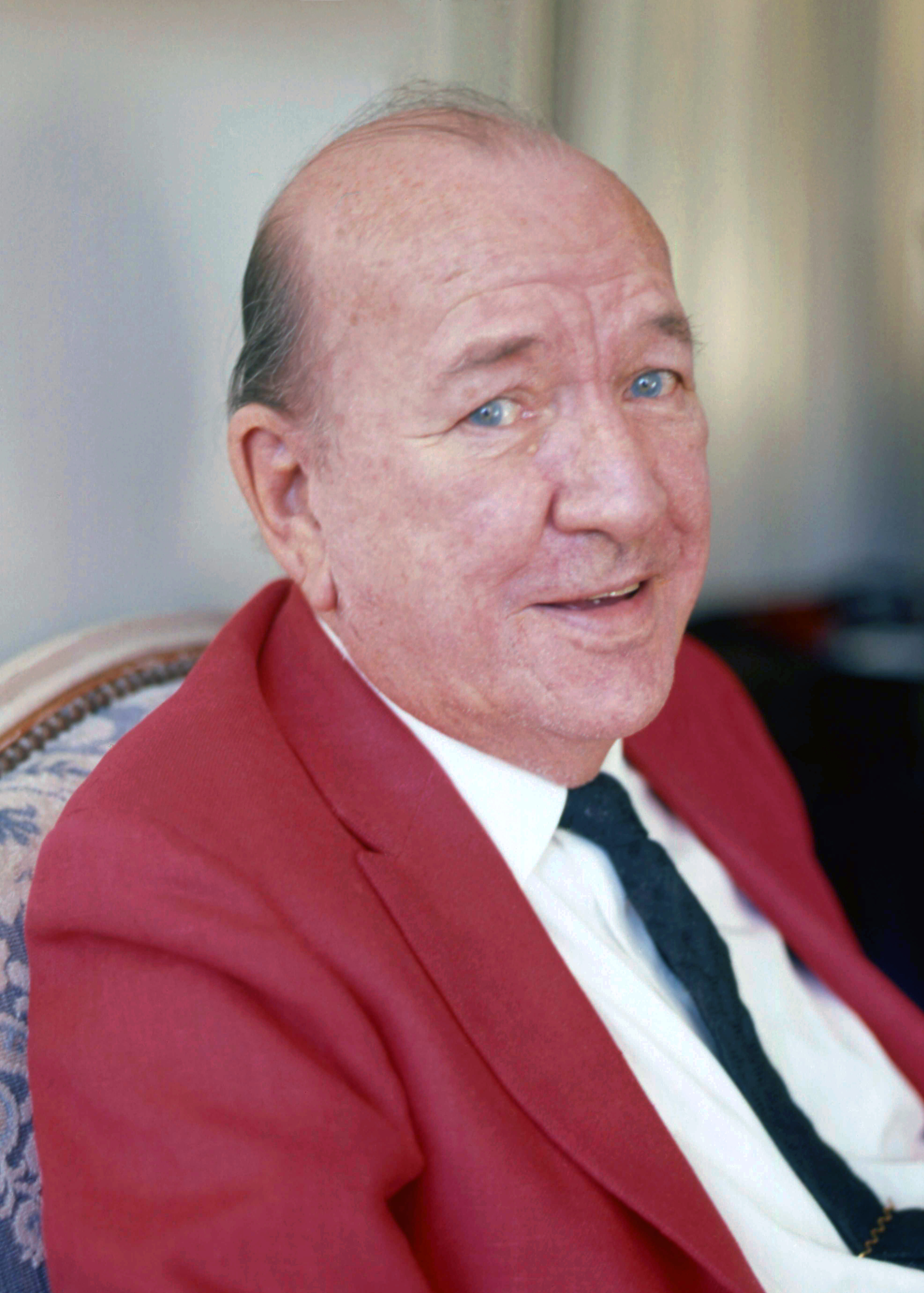
Noël Coward

He was spotted by Binkie Beaumont, head of the theatrical production company H M Tennent, who cast him in prestigious West End productions. Moffatt was able to play alongside two of his idols John Gielgud and Noël Coward: with the former in The Winter's Tale in 1951 and in Much Ado About Nothing in 1952, and with the latter in The Apple Cart in 1953.

With the English Stage Company at the Royal Court he appeared in Nigel Dennis's Cards of Identity and Brecht's The Good Woman of Szechuan and attracted considerable attention as Mr Sparkish in Wycherley's The Country Wife. The production transferred to the West End and Broadway. In September 1959 Moffatt joined the Old Vic company, playing in As You Like It, Richard II, Saint Joan, The Merry Wives of Windsor, Henry V and Barrie's What Every Woman Knows. He played Algy in The Importance of Being Earnest on a tour of Britain, Poland and Russia. In 1962 he won the Clarence Derwent award as best supporting actor of the past season for his portrayal of Cardinal Cajetan in John Osborne's Play at the Royal Court, transferring to the West End and Broadway.

In 1963 Moffatt got his first starring role, as Lord Foppington in Virtue in Danger, a musical adaptation of Vanburgh's The Relapse. The Times said of this, "It established Moffatt as our leading exponent of foppery and it remained one of his favourite parts." In 1969 he joined Laurence Olivier's National Theatre company at the Old Vic. His roles included Fainall in The Way of the World, Judge Brack in Hedda Gabler with Maggie Smith and Robert Stephens, directed by Ingmar Bergman, Menenius in Coriolanus, Cardinal Arragon in The White Devil, a range of parts in The Captain of Köpenick and Sir Joshua Rat in Adrian Mitchell's Tyger.

=== 1970s and 80s ===
In 1972 Moffatt was narrator and one of the main performers in the revue Cowardy Custard at the Mermaid, a compilation of the words and music of Noël Coward, who was present at the premiere. Moffatt later played the playwright Garry Essendine in Coward's Present Laughter, another of his favourite roles.

In The Bed Before Yesterday by Ben Travers (1975), Moffatt gave what The Times considered one of his subtlest performances as the hen-pecked husband opposite the sexually rampaging Joan Plowright. The Daily Telegraph commented that he made a touching theatrical virtue of both ruefulness and inadequacy. In The Play's The Thing (1979) an adaptation by P. G. Wodehouse of a play by Ferenc Molnar, (Greenwich, 1979) he played a monocled, acid-tongued theatre director. In The Observer, Robert Cushman wrote, "John Moffatt, a master of the languishing comic art of flicking off a line without ever losing it, may be giving the performance of his life."

William Gaskill's production of The Way of the World (Chichester and the Haymarket, 1983–84), was overwhelmingly a triumph for Maggie Smith as Millamant (described by The Guardian as "one of the great high comedy achievements of the past three decades"), but according to The Times, "the other great collector's performance is John Moffatt's Witwoud, a harmless old bitch got up like a coffee meringue, whose lines have never enjoyed more flawless touch and timing".

In Ronald Harwood's Interpreters (1985) Moffatt played a Foreign Office official striving to keep the peace between Maggie Smith's Nadia and Edward Fox's Viktor. His last West End play was Married Love (1988), Peter Luke's play about Marie Stopes; Moffatt received good notices for his performance as Bernard Shaw, but the play, and Joan Plowright's direction received harsh criticism, and the piece ran for less than a month.

=== Radio and television ===
Moffatt first broadcast on BBC radio in 1950 in Mrs Dale's Diary. His later radio roles included Oswald to Gielgud's King Lear, Lord Chief Justice to Timothy West's Falstaff and Quilp in The Old Curiosity Shop. He played both Sherlock Holmes and Dr. John Watson in BBC radio adaptations.

In 1980 he appeared in Love in a Cold Climate and for much of the 1980s was a member of the BBC's Radio Drama Company. His most conspicuous radio role was Hercule Poirot in 25 adaptations of Agatha Christie's detective stories, beginning with The Murder of Roger Ackroyd on 24 December 1987. and ending with Dead Man's Folly on 27 August 2007.

Moffatt made his television debut in 1953, as Grebeauval in The Public Prosecutor, and appeared many times on BBC and commercial television over the decades. He played Joseph Surface in The School For Scandal, Brush in The Clandestine Marriage, the Prince of Aragon in The Merchant of Venice, Casca in Julius Caesar, Malvolio and Sir Andrew in two different productions of Twelfth Night, and Ben in R.F. Delderfield's The Adventures of Ben Gunn. Other television appearances during the 1970s saw Moffat appear in Granada Television's daytime legal drama series Crown Court, in which he played barrister Adam Honeycombe QC.

In 1982 Moffat appeared as West London gangster Freddie Baker, in the Minder episode "Looking for Micky."

He appeared in one episode of the televised adaptations of Agatha Christie's other celebrated detective series, Miss Marple as Edwards in The Body in the Library. In Thames Television's adaptation of Nancy Mitford's Love in a Cold Climate he played the eccentric Lord Merlin.

=== Films ===
Moffatt's film debut was in Loser Takes All (1956), in the small role of a hotel barman. His only other film in the 1950s was The Silent Enemy (1958). In 1963 he appeared in Tom Jones (1963). The 1970s were his most fruitful years as a film performer. He appeared in Julius Caesar (1970), Lady Caroline Lamb (1972), Romance with a Double Bass (1974), Galileo (1974), Murder on the Orient Express (1974), and S.O.S. Titanic (1979). In the 1980s he played in Minder (1982), and Britannia Hospital (1982).

=== Later years ===
After retiring from stage acting in 1988, Moffatt regularly appeared with Judi Dench and her husband, Michael Williams in a verse compilation Fond and Familiar. After Williams died in 2001, Dench and Moffatt performed the show with Geoffrey Palmer. The critic of The Independent wrote, "Limericks, epitaphs and autograph-book exhortations jostled with old war-horse recitations and some inspired lunacy. I especially liked … the solemn singing, in canon form, of the rule 'If you haven't been the lover of the landlady's daughter, then you cannot have another piece of pie'."

After a long illness, Moffatt died at his home two weeks short of his 90th birthday. He was unmarried, and was survived by a sister, Marjorie. Radio Four Extra planned to mark Moffatt's 90th birthday with a series of radio plays he had recorded throughout his career, upon his death the plays were broadcast earlier than scheduled beginning with Elephants Can Remember by Agatha Christie in which Moffatt played Hercule Poirot and Julia McKenzie played Ariadne Oliver.

== Filmography ==
Year	Title	Role	Notes
1956	Loser Takes All	Barman	Uncredited
1958	The Silent Enemy	Diving Volunteer	
1963	Tom Jones	Square	
1970	Julius Caesar	Popilius Lena	
1972	Lady Caroline Lamb	Murray	
1974	Murder on the Orient Express	Chief Attendant	
1974	Galileo	Philosopher	
1975	Romance with a Double Bass	Majordomo	Short
1979	S.O.S. Titanic	Benjamin Guggenheim	TV film
1982	Britannia Hospital	Greville Figg: Administration	
1985	Honour, Profit and Pleasure	Steele	TV film
1987	Prick Up Your Ears	Wigmaker	
