= Michael Bakewell =

British television producer (1931–2023)

- Born: Michael John Bakewell; 7 June 1931; Birmingham, Warwickshire, England
- Died: 11 July 2023 (aged 92)
- Education: King's College, Cambridge
- Occupations: Radio and television producer, radio dramatist

Michael John Bakewell (7 June 1931 – 11 July 2023) was a British radio and television producer.

== Early life and career ==
Michael John Bakewell was born in Birmingham, Warwickshire, England, on 7 June 1931. His childhood was spent in Sutton Coldfield, where he attended Bishop Vesey's Grammar School. After completing his National Service in the Royal Air Force, he studied English literature at King's College, Cambridge. After graduating from Cambridge in 1954, he was recruited by the BBC's Third Programme.

Bakewell was best known for his work during the 1960s, when he was the first Head of Plays at the BBC, after Sydney Newman divided the drama department into separate series, serials and plays divisions in 1963. Later, Bakewell produced plays for BBC2's Theatre 625 anthology strand, including John Hopkins' highly regarded Talking to a Stranger quartet of linked plays.

Bakewell also worked in radio drama for the BBC. He adapted (with Brian Sibley) The Lord of the Rings into a 1981 radio series, and he adapted 27 of Agatha Christie's Poirot novels for broadcast between 1985 and 2007 – the major omission being Curtain: Poirot's Last Case, the rights to which proved unobtainable – and all 12 Miss Marple novels, broadcast between 1993 and 2001. He was also the dubbing director for the English versions of the Japanese television series The Water Margin and Monkey, which were screened by the BBC, among many of Manga Video UK's dubs (and many dubs for both Central Park Media and Manga Video UK), e.g., Cyber City Oedo, Devilman, Dominion Tank Police, Patlabor (Manga PAL version - movies 1 and 2), Tokyo Babylon, Genocyber, Roujin Z, Angel Cop, Violence Jack and many others.

== Personal life and death ==
From 1955 until 1972, Michael Bakewell was the first husband of Joan Bakewell; the couple had two children, Matthew and Harriet. In the 1960s, Joan had an eight-year affair with the playwright Harold Pinter.

Following their divorce, Michael remarried to Melissa Dundas in 1975. He lived with Melissa in East Sussex until his death on 11 July 2023, at the age of 92. He had Alzheimer's disease and macular degeneration in his later years.
