= The Pale Horse =

1961 mystery novel by Agatha Christie

- Dust-jacket illustration of the first UK edition
- Author: Agatha Christie
- Cover artist: Not known
- Language: English
- Genre: Crime
- Publisher: Collins Crime Club
- Publication date: 6 November 1961
- Publication place: United Kingdom
- Media type: Print (hardback & paperback)
- Pages: 256 (first edition, hardcover)
- Preceded by: Double Sin and Other Stories
- Followed by: The Mirror Crack'd from Side to Side

The Pale Horse is a mystery novel by British writer Agatha Christie, first published in the UK by the Collins Crime Club on 6 November 1961, and in the US by Dodd, Mead and Company the following year. The UK edition retailed at fifteen shillings (15/- = 75p) and the US edition at $3.75. The novel features her novelist detective Ariadne Oliver as a minor character, and reflects in tone the supernatural novels of Dennis Wheatley who was then at the height of his popularity. The Pale Horse is mentioned in Revelation 6:8, where it is ridden by Death.

== Plot introduction ==
A dying woman, Mrs Davis, gives her last confession to Father Gorman, a Roman Catholic priest, but along with her confession she gives him a list of names and a terrible secret. Before he can take action, however, he is struck dead in the fog. As the police begin to investigate, a young hero begins to piece together evidence that sets him upon a converging path.

== Plot summary ==
In the following summary, events are not given in strict narrative order.

Mark Easterbrook, the central character of the book and its principal narrator, sees a fight between two girls in a Chelsea coffee bar, during which one pulls out some of the other's hair at the roots. Soon afterwards, he finds out that one of the girls, Thomasina Tuckerton, has died. At dinner with a friend, a woman named Poppy Stirling mentions something called the Pale Horse that arranges deaths, but is suddenly scared at having mentioned it and will say no more.

When Mark encounters the police surgeon, Corrigan, he learns of the list of surnames found in the shoe of a murdered priest called Father Gorman. The list includes the names Corrigan, Tuckerton and Hesketh-Dubois (the same name as Mark's godmother who has recently died of what appear to be natural causes). He begins to fear that the list contains the names of those who are dead or are shortly to die.

When Mark goes to a village fete, organised by his cousin, at Much Deeping, with the famous mystery writer, Ariadne Oliver, he hears about a house which has been converted from an old inn called the Pale Horse. The house is inhabited by three modern "witches", led by Thyrza Grey. Visiting houses in the area, he meets Mr Venables, a man who uses a wheelchair and has no apparent explanation for his substantial wealth.

Mark also visits the Pale Horse, and Thyrza Grey discusses with him the ability to kill at a distance, which she claims to have developed. In retrospect, it seems to Mark that she has been outlining to him a service that she would be willing to provide. As part of the police investigation, a witness, Zachariah Osborne, describes a man seen following Father Gorman shortly before the murder. Later, Osborne tells the police that he has seen the same man in a wheelchair. Even though he finds out that the man, Venables, is crippled by polio, and is incapable of standing due to the atrophy of his legs, Osborne remains certain of his identification and suggests that Venables could have faked his disability.

Mark's girlfriend, Hermia, does not take his growing fears seriously and he becomes disaffected with her. He does, however, receive support from Ariadne Oliver, and from a vicar's wife, Dane Calthrop, who wants him to stop whatever evil might be taking place. Mark also makes an ally of Katherine "Ginger" Corrigan, a girl whom he has met in the area, and who successfully draws Poppy out about the Pale Horse organisation. Ginger obtains from Poppy an address in Birmingham, where Mark meets Mr Bradley, a disbarred lawyer, who outlines the means by which the Pale Horse functions without breaking the law – that Bradley bets someone will die within a certain period of time and the client bets otherwise. If the person in question does die within that time, the client must pay. (One client who refused fell in front of an oncoming train and was killed).

With the agreement of Inspector Lejeune and the co-operation of Ginger, Mark agrees to solicit the murder of his first wife, who will be played by Ginger. At a ritual of some kind at the Pale Horse, Mark witnesses Thyrza apparently channel a malignant spirit through an electrical apparatus. Shortly afterwards, Ginger falls ill and begins to decline rapidly. In desperation, Mark turns to Poppy again, who mentions that her friend, Eileen Brandon, resigned from a research organisation called CRC (Customers' Reactions Classified) that seems to be connected with the Pale Horse. When Mrs Brandon is interviewed, she reveals that both she and Mrs Davis worked for the organisation, which surveyed targeted people about what foods, cosmetics and proprietary medicines they used.

Ariadne Oliver contacts Mark with a key connection that she has made: another victim of the Pale Horse (Mary Delafontaine) has lost her hair during her illness. The same thing happened to Lady Hesketh-Dubois, and Thomasina's hair was easily pulled out during the fight. Moreover, Ginger has begun to shed her own hair. Mark recognises the symptoms are of thallium poisoning, not some sort of satanic assassination.

It is revealed that Osborne has been the brains behind the Pale Horse organisation, and that the black magic element was a piece of misdirection on his part. The murders were committed by replacing products the victims had named in the CRC survey with poisoned ones. Osborne's clumsy attempt to implicate Venables was a vital mistake. After Osborne's arrest, Mark and Ginger, who is recovering, become engaged.

== Characters ==
- Mark Easterbrook, a historian researching the Moguls
- Inspector Lejeune, the investigating officer
- Ariadne Oliver, the celebrated author (based on Agatha Christie)
- Jim Corrigan, the police surgeon
- Ginger Corrigan, a young woman (not related to Jim)
- Mr Venables, a wealthy man who uses a wheelchair
- Zachariah Osborne, a pharmacist
- Mr Bradley, legal representative of The Pale Horse
- Thyrza Grey, a practitioner of the Dark Arts
- Sybil Stamfordis, a medium
- Bella Webb, Thyrza Grey's cook and self-professed witch
- Thomasina Tuckerton, a wealthy young woman
- Pamela "Poppy" Stirling, an employee of Flower Studies Ltd.
- Rev Dane Calthrop, the local vicar
- Mrs Dane Calthrop, the vicar's wife
- Rhoda Despard, Mark Easterbrook's cousin
- Colonel Hugh Despard, Rhoda's husband
- Mrs Tuckerton, Thomasina's stepmother (and heiress)
- Mrs Coppins, owner of the boarding house where Mrs Davis dies
- Eileen Brandon, a former employee of Customers' Reactions Classified
- Hermia Redcliffe, Mark's pretentious girlfriend
- David Ardingley, a historian friend of Mark
- Father Gorman, a Roman Catholic priest

=== Characters repeated in other Christie works ===
- Ariadne Oliver also appears in Parker Pyne Investigates, Cards on the Table, Mrs McGinty's Dead, Dead Man's Folly, Third Girl, Hallowe'en Party, and Elephants Can Remember.
- Colonel Despard (as Major John Despard) and Rhoda Dawes (maiden name) both also appear in Cards on the Table.
- Rev and Mrs Dane Calthrop both also appear in The Moving Finger.

== Literary significance and reception ==
Francis Iles (Anthony Berkeley Cox) praised the novel in the 8 December 1961 issue of The Guardian: "Mrs Agatha Christie is our nearest approach to perpetual motion. And not only does she never stop, but she drops the ball into the cup nearly every time; and if one is sometimes reminded of those automatic machines where one pulls a handle and out pops the finished product, that is a compliment to the automatic machine and not by any means a reflection on Mrs Christie. For the latest tug on the Christie handle produces a product which is not only up to the standard but even above it. The Pale Horse is in fact the best sample from this particular factory for some time, and that is saying plenty. The black magic theme is handled in a masterly and sinister fashion, and to give away what lay behind it would be unforgivable. This is a book which nobody (repeat, nobody) should miss." Iles further named the novel as his favourite in the paper's Critic's choice for the end of the year, published one week later, writing that "It has not been an outstanding year for crime fiction, but as usual there have been one or two first-class items. The best puzzle has certainly been Agatha Christie's The Pale Horse."

Robert Barnard: "Goodish late example – loosely plotted, but with intriguing, fantastical central idea. Plot concerns a Murder-Inc.-type organisation, with a strong overlay of black magic. Also makes use of 'The Box,' a piece of pseudo-scientific hocus-pocus fashionable in the West Country in the 'fifties (one of the things which drove Waugh to the verge of lunacy, as narrated in Pinfold)."

In the "Binge!" article of Entertainment Weekly Issue #1343-44 (26 December 2014–3 January 2015), the writers picked The Pale Horse as an "EW favorite" on the list of the "Nine Great Christie Novels".

== References or allusions ==
=== References to other works ===
Several of Christie's earlier characters reappear in this book. In addition to Ariadne Oliver, Major Despard and his wife Rhoda (who met and fell in love in Cards on the Table) also participate in the plot. Mrs Dane Calthrop from The Moving Finger also reappears in approximately the same role as she played in that book: the rational but devoted Christian who wants the evil stopped.

Mrs Oliver is apprehensive of attending a fete, for reasons that will be apparent to readers of her previous appearance in a Christie novel: Dead Man's Folly.

In his conversation with Max Easterbrook, David Ardingley describes meeting a “nice elderly lady” at a psychiatric hospital who asked him “is it your poor child, who’s buried there, behind the fireplace?,” possibly making this an early appearance of Mrs Lancaster from By the Pricking of My Thumbs, which was published in 1968.

=== References in actual history ===
This novel is notable among Christie's books as it is credited with having saved at least two lives after readers recognised the symptoms of thallium poisoning from its description in the book.

- In 1975, Christie received a letter from a woman in Latin America who recognised the symptoms of thallium poisoning, thus saving a woman from slow poisoning by her husband.
- In 1977, a 19-month-old infant from Qatar was suffering from a mysterious illness. After the baby was flown to London, Marsha Maitland, a nurse who had been reading The Pale Horse, correctly suggested that the baby was suffering from thallium poisoning.
- In another instance, in 1971, a serial killer, Graham Frederick Young, who had poisoned several people, three fatally, was caught thanks to this book. A doctor conferring with Scotland Yard had read The Pale Horse and realised that the mysterious "Bovingdon bug" (the deaths occurred in a factory in Bovingdon, England) was in fact thallium poisoning.

The novel is also cited to have been the "inspiration" of what was dubbed "The Mensa Murder". In 1988, George Trepal, an American Mensa Club member, poisoned his neighbours, Pye and Peggy Carr and their children, with thallium introduced in a Coca-Cola Classic bottles eight-pack. Peggy Carr succumbed while the others survived the attack.

== Adaptations ==
=== TV ===
==== First ITV adaptation ====
The novel was first adapted for TV by ITV in 1997, in a 100-minute TV film with Colin Buchanan as Mark Easterbrook. This version omitted the character of Ariadne Oliver. It makes Easterbrook the suspect in the killing of Father Gorman. At first it seems that the murders are masterminded by Venables, who it transpires is not disabled, but ultimately Osbourne is still revealed as the murderer.

==== Second ITV adaptation ====
A second adaptation was later made by the same network, done by Russell Lewis for the fifth series of ITV's Agatha Christie's Marple starring Julia McKenzie in 2010. As the character of Miss Marple was made the chief sleuth of the plot, several changes were made for the adaptation:

- The characters of Ariadne Oliver, Pamela "Poppy" Stirling, Colonel and Rhoda Despard, Jim Corrigan, and Rev. and Mrs Dane Calthrop, are omitted from the adaptation; the omission of Rhoda and Colonel Despard is probably due to the fact that in the Agatha Christie's Poirot adaptation of Cards on the Table, Rhoda dies in place of Anne Meredith, and Colonel Despard falls in love with Anne instead.
- New characters were invented for it:
  - Captain Cottam – a local in Much Deeping with a firm dislike of Venables. These men do not see eye to eye, with Cottam claiming Venables was responsible for a fire at his home.
  - Kanga Cottam – Wife of the Captain, staying with him at The Pale Horse
  - Lydia Harsnet – Housekeeper of the Cottams, who secretly is having an affair with the husband.
- Father Gorman is made a friend of Miss Marple, and sends the list of names he received from Mrs Davis to her just before his murder. After learning of his death, and coming to London, Miss Marple visits Mrs Davis' home and finds a second list of names in one of her shoes; because Poppy is omitted from the adaptation, Miss Marple is led to the Pale Horse by the second list, written on headed paper taken from the hotel, which also included dates next to the names on it.
- While The Pale Horse is a house converted from a pub in the novel, the adaptation places it as always being a hotel, bought by Thyrza Grey and her associates shortly after the previous owner lost his wife. The fete held at the village still occurs but has no involvement from Mark Easterbrook's cousin.
- Bradley's office is relocated from Birmingham to Charing Cross, London. His address (supplied in the novel by the now-omitted Poppy) is provided to Miss Marple by Ginger Corrigan, who had found his card during a party held by Mrs Tuckerton.
- Thomasina Tuckerton is not involved in a fight in the adaptation.
- The first name of Osbourne is changed from Zachariah to Paul, while his profession is changed from pharmacist to Sales Officer. Other modifications included an attempt by Osbourne to poison Miss Marple, who tricks him into believing she had been but hadn't and reveals she had discovered his attempt by a mistake he made in not observing her sense of order, and a slight change in the solicitation of murder made by Mark, in which the police involvement is greater, while Ginger does not fall ill as she is not poisoned.
- The knowledge of Mrs Davis' involvement with CRC, is found differently due to the omissions of Poppy and Eileen – Inspector Lejeune learns about CRC by having Bradley tailed, shortly after meeting Miss Marple outside his offices, to which Marple suspects that Mrs Davis was involved with them owing to her earlier asking Mrs Coppins about her work.
- During Osbourne's attempt to cast suspicion on Venables he takes Miss Marple to spy on Venables' house after dark, where they see him get up from his wheelchair to draw the curtains. (This reinforces Osbourne's false claim to have earlier observed Venables – or an identical double – cosh Fr. Gorman in London.) The final confrontation scene reveals that Inspector Lejeune was playing Venables inside the house, hence his ability to walk. The real Venables is indeed paralyzed.

==== French adaptation ====
It was adapted as a 2016 episode of the French television series Les Petits Meurtres d'Agatha Christie.

==== BBC adaptation ====
In June 2019, it was announced that Sarah Phelps, who had written several Christie adaptations for BBC and Mammoth Screen, would write a new adaptation of The Pale Horse. The two-part series was broadcast on 9 and 16 February 2020 on BBC One. The cast included Rufus Sewell as Mark Easterbrook, Sean Pertwee as Inspector Lejeune, Bertie Carvel as Zachariah Osborne, Kaya Scodelario as Hermia, and Sheila Atim, Rita Tushingham and Kathy Kiera Clarke as the "witches" of Much Deeping. It was only very loosely based on the novel, deviating in many significant ways, including the portrayal of Mark Easterbrook as a twice-married antihero. The Independent noted that it had a "satisfying conclusion despite traditional whodunnit thrills", while The Telegraph asserted that it chucked "the rat-filled kitchen sink into this rewrite of Agatha Christie".

=== Radio ===
The novel has been adapted twice for BBC Radio:

- An adaptation was broadcast in 1993 to celebrate the 50th anniversary of BBC Radio 4's Saturday Night Theatre. This was dramatized by Michael Bakewell and featured Jeremy Clyde as Mark Easterbrooke, Stephanie Cole as Ariadne Oliver, Terence Alexander as Mr. Venables, Mary Wimbush as Thyrza Grey, Hilda Schroder as Bella, Stephen Hodson as Jim Corrigan, Jonathan Adams as Inspector Lejeune and Federay Holmes as Ginger.
- A new BBC Radio 4 adaptation in three parts was first broadcast in September 2014 and has been re-broadcast in January 2018. This was dramatized by Joy Wilkinson and featured Jason Hughes as Mark Easterbrook, Eleanor Bron as Thyrza, Georgia Groome as Ginger, Michael Bertenshaw as Inspector Lejeune, Phoebe Pryce as Hermia, Ron Cook as Osborne and Nicholas Jones as Venables.

== Publication history ==
- 1961, Collins Crime Club (London), 6 November 1961, Hardback, 256 pp
- 1962, Dodd Mead and Company (New York), 1962, Hardback, 242 pp
- 1963, Pocket Books (New York), Paperback
- 1964, Fontana Books (Imprint of HarperCollins), Paperback, 191 pp
- 1965, Ulverscroft Large-print Edition, Hardcover, 256 pp
- 2011, HarperCollins; Facsimile edition Hardcover: 256 pages ISBN 978-0-00-739572-9

The novel was first serialised in the British weekly magazine Woman’s Mirror in eight abridged instalments from 2 September to 21 October 1961 with illustrations by Zelinski.

In the US a condensed version of the novel appeared in the April 1962 (Volume LXXIX, Number 4) issue of the Ladies Home Journal with an illustration by Eugenie Louis.
