= The Clocks =

1963 Poirot novel by Agatha Christie

- Dust jacket illustration of the first UK edition
- Author: Agatha Christie
- Cover artist: Michael Harvey
- Language: English
- Series: Hercule Poirot
- Genre: Crime, espionage
- Publisher: Collins Crime Club
- Publication date: 7 November 1963
- Publication place: United Kingdom
- Media type: Print (hardback & paperback)
- Pages: 256 (first edition, hardcover)
- Preceded by: Cat Among the Pigeons
- Followed by: Third Girl

The Clocks is a mystery novel by British writer Agatha Christie, first published in the UK by the Collins Crime Club on 7 November 1963 and in the US by Dodd, Mead and Company the following year. It features the Belgian detective Hercule Poirot. The UK edition retailed at sixteen shillings (16/-) and the US edition at $4.50.

In the novel Poirot never visits any of the crime scenes or speaks to any of the witnesses or suspects. He is challenged to prove his claim that a crime can be solved by the exercise of the intellect alone. The novel marks the return of partial first-person narrative, a technique that Christie had largely abandoned earlier in the Poirot sequence but which she had employed in the previous Ariadne Oliver novel, The Pale Horse (1961). There are two interwoven plots: the mystery Poirot works on from his armchair while the police work on the spot, and a Cold War spy story told in the first person narrative.

Reviews at the time of publication found the writing up to Christie's par, but found negatives: the murder of a character about to add useful information was considered "corny" and "unworthy" of the author, and "not as zestful". In contrast, Barnard's review in 1990 said it was a "lively, well-narrated, highly unlikely late specimen" of Christie's writing. He loved the clocks at the start, and was oddly disappointed that they were red herrings.

== Plot summary ==
Sheila Webb, a typist at Miss Martindale's secretarial agency, arrives at her afternoon appointment at Wilbraham Crescent in Crowdean, Sussex. She finds a well-dressed older man, stabbed to death, surrounded by six clocks, four of which are stopped at 4:13, while the cuckoo clock announces it is 3 o'clock. When a blind woman enters the house about to step on the corpse, Sheila runs screaming out of the house and into the arms of a young man passing down the street.

This man, Special Branch or MI5 agent Colin "Lamb", takes Sheila into his care. He is investigating a clue from a note found in a dead agent's pocket: letter M, number 61, and a sketch of a crescent moon written on a bit of hotel stationery (sketched in the book). At 19 Wilbraham Crescent, home of the blind Miss Pebmarsh, a police investigation begins into the murder. The dead man's business card proves false. His clothing reveals nothing else, as all labels have been removed. He was killed with an ordinary kitchen knife. Colin and Inspector Hardcastle interview the neighbours. Their homes adjoin the murder site on the street or from the back gardens in this unusually arranged Victorian housing development. Colin takes a liking to Sheila.

Hardcastle questions Mrs Lawton, the aunt who raised Rosemary Sheila Webb. Rosemary is the name on a clock found at the scene of the murder, but it disappeared before police gathered them up. Colin approaches Hercule Poirot, an old friend of his father, to investigate the case. He challenges Poirot to do so from his armchair. He gives Poirot detailed notes. Poirot accepts, then instructs Colin to talk further with the neighbours.

At the inquest, the medical examiner explains that chloral hydrate was given to the victim before he was murdered. After the inquest, Edna Brent, one of the agency secretaries, expresses confusion at something said in evidence. She tries but fails to convey this to Hardcastle and is soon found dead in a telephone box on Wilbraham Crescent, strangled with her own scarf. The dead man's identity is as yet unknown. Mrs Merlina Rival (original name Flossie Gapp) identifies the dead man as her one-time husband, Harry Castleton. Colin leaves Britain on his own case, travelling behind the Iron Curtain to Romania. He returns with the information he needed, but not the person he hoped to find. Following Poirot's advice, Colin talks with the neighbours. He finds a ten-year-old girl, Geraldine Brown, in the apartment block across the street. She has been observing and recording the events at Wilbraham Crescent while confined to her room with a broken leg. She reveals that a new laundry service delivered a heavy basket of laundry on the morning of the murder. Colin tells Hardcastle.

Hardcastle tells Mrs Rival that her description of the deceased is not accurate. Upset, she calls the person who involved her in this case. Despite being watched by police, she is found dead at Victoria tube station, stabbed in the back. Poirot's initial view of this case is that the appearance of complexity must conceal quite a simple murder. The clocks are a red herring, as are the presence of Sheila and the removal of the dead man's wallet and tailor marks in the clothing. Colin updates Poirot on subsequent visits.

At a room in a Crowdean hotel, Poirot tells Inspector Hardcastle and Colin Lamb what he has deduced. From a careful chronology, he deduces what Edna realised. She had returned early from lunch on the day of the murder because her shoe was broken, unnoticed by Miss Martindale, the owner. Miss Martindale took no telephone call at the time she claimed she had, and is the one person with motive to murder Edna. From that fictitious call, the boss sent Sheila to Miss Pebmarsh's house for steno/typing service. Miss Pebmarsh denies requesting this service. Mrs Bland, one of the neighbours, mentioned she had a sister in the initial interview with Hardcastle. Poirot deduced the identity of this sister as Miss Martindale.

The present Mrs Bland is the second Mrs Bland. Mr Bland had said his wife received a substantial family inheritance as the sole living relative, but if she has a sister, she cannot be the sole heir. Mr Bland's first wife died in the Second World War, and he remarried soon after, to another Canadian woman. The family of his first wife had cut off communication with their daughter so thoroughly they did not know she had died. Sixteen years later, the first wife was announced to be the heiress to an overseas fortune as the last-known living relative. When this news reached the Blands, they decided the second Mrs Bland must pose as the first Mrs Bland. They fool a British firm of solicitors that sought the heir. When Quentin Duguesclin, who knew the first wife and her family, looked her up in England, a plan was laid to murder him. The plan was simple, with additions like the clocks taken from an unpublished mystery story that Miss Martindale had read in a manuscript as embellishment.

They murdered Mrs Rival before she could tell the police who had hired her. Mr Bland and his sister-in-law thought their plan would baffle the police, while Mrs Bland felt she was a pawn in their schemes. Mr Bland disposed of Duguesclin's passport on a trip to Boulogne, which trip he mentioned to Colin in casual conversation. Poirot holds that people reveal much in simple conversation. Poirot had assumed this trip took place, so the man's passport would be found in a country different from where he was murdered, and long after friends and family in Canada had missed him on his holiday in Europe. The missing clock, with Rosemary written on it, was traced. Colin realises that Sheila had taken it and tossed it in the neighbour's dustbin, seeing it was her very own clock, mislaid on the way to a repair shop. But the clock had been taken by Miss Martindale, not mislaid by Sheila.

Colin turns his note upside down, and it points him to 19 Wilbraham Crescent. Miss Millicent Pebmarsh is the centre of the ring passing information to the other side in the Cold War, using Braille to encode their messages. He has decided to marry Sheila and realises that Miss Pebmarsh is Sheila's mother, and thus his future mother-in-law. He gives her two hours warning of the net closing around her. She chose her cause over her child once and does so again, clutching a small deadly knife. "Lamb" disarms her and the two wait for the arrest, both firm in their convictions. The novel closes with two letters from Inspector Hardcastle to Poirot, telling him police have found all the hard evidence to close the case. Mrs Bland, less ruthless than her sister, admitted all under questioning.

== Characters ==
- Hercule Poirot, renowned Belgian detective.
- Inspector Dick Hardcastle, the investigating officer.
- Sergeant Cray, a policeman in the case.
- Colin "Lamb", a British Intelligence agent, hinted to be a son of Superintendent Battle.
- Miss Katherine Martindale, owner of the Cavendish Secretarial Bureau; sister of Valerie Bland. Nicknamed 'Sandy Cat' by the typists. She worked with her brother-in-law to murder Duguesclin.
- Sheila Webb, a typist with the Cavendish Secretarial Bureau.
- Mrs Lawton, aunt of Sheila Webb, who raised her from infancy, and sister to Sheila's mother.
- Edna Brent, a typist with the Cavendish Secretarial Bureau, who is murdered.
- Miss Millicent Pebmarsh, a blind teacher and inhabitant of 19 Wilbraham Crescent.
- James Waterhouse, occupant of 18 Wilbraham Crescent.
- Edith Waterhouse, James's sister.
- Mrs Hemming, occupant of 20 Wilbraham Crescent.
- Josaiah Bland, a builder, occupant of 61 Wilbraham Crescent.
- Valerie Bland, second wife of Josaiah Bland and sister of Miss Katherine Martindale.
- Quentin Duguesclin, friend of the family of the first Mrs Bland, murdered and left in Miss Pebmarsh's home.
- Mrs Ramsay, occupant of 62 Wilbraham Crescent, now abandoned by her husband.
- Bill Ramsay, Mrs Ramsay's older son (11 years old).
- Ted Ramsay, Mrs Ramsay's younger son, also home from school for the holidays.
- Angus McNaughton, a retired professor, occupant of 63 Wilbraham Crescent.
- Mrs McNaughton, Angus's wife.
- Gretel, the McNaughtons' "Danish girl"/au pair.
- Merlina Rival, a pawn of the murderers who is killed by them.
- Colonel Beck, Colin's superior in British Intelligence.
- Geraldine Brown, a young girl living across from 19 Wilbraham Crescent.
- Ingrid, Geraldine Brown's Norwegian au pair.

== Literary significance and reception ==
Francis Iles (Anthony Berkeley Cox) reviewed the novel in The Guardian's issue of 20 December 1963 when he said, "I am not so sure. This begins well, with the discovery of a stranger in a suburban sitting-room, with four strange clocks all showing the same time; but thereafter the story, though as readable as ever, does tend to hang fire. Also there is one very corny item, the vital witness killed when on the point of disclosing crucial information, which is quite unworthy of Miss Christie."

Maurice Richardson of The Observer (10 November 1963) concluded, "Not as zestful as usual. Plenty of ingenuity about the timing, though."

Robert Barnard: "Lively, well-narrated, highly unlikely late specimen – you have to accept two spies and three murderers living in one small-town crescent. The business of the clocks, fantastic and intriguing in itself, fizzles out miserably at the end. Contains (chapter 14) Poirot's considered reflections on other fictional detectives, and the various styles and national schools of crime writing."

== References to other works ==
- In Chapter 14, Poirot refers again to one of his favourite cases, the one related in The Nemean Lion, the first story of The Labours of Hercules.
- In Chapter 24 mention is made of Poirot's role in "the Girl Guide murder case". This had been retold in Dead Man's Folly.

== Adaptations ==
An adaptation for the ITV television series Agatha Christie's Poirot, with David Suchet as Poirot, was produced for the show's twelfth series, aired in the UK in 2011. Guest stars include Tom Burke as Lieutenant Colin Race, Jaime Winstone as Sheila Webb, Lesley Sharp as Miss Martindale, and Anna Massey as Miss Pebmarsh. This was Massey's last performance before her death, and the ITV broadcast of the episode is dedicated to her memory. Charles Palmer (who also directed Hallowe'en Party for the series) directs this instalment, with the screenplay being written by Stewart Harcourt (who also wrote the screenplay for Murder on the Orient Express). The adaptation was filmed on location in Dover, Dover Castle and St Margaret's Bay, and in Islington, London.

For the television adaptation, the setting was shifted from the Cold War era of the 1960s to the 1930s (keeping it in line with ITV's other adaptation of Poirot's cases set around the same decade), with a further change in location from Crowdean, Sussex, to Dover, Kent. Whilst the novel's main plot is retained, a number of significant changes were made by the adaptation, including a modification of the novel's sub-plot due to the change in setting:

- The characters of Mr and Mrs McNaughton, and Geraldine Brown are omitted from the adaptation. Three other characters were replaced with new ones: Constable Jenkins replaces Sergeant Cray as Hardcastle's assistant in the police investigations; Vice Admiral Hamling replaces Colonel Beck as Colin's superior; Christopher Mabbutt and his daughters, May and Jenny, replace the Ramsays at No. 62 Wilbraham Crescent, and are involved in the story's sub-plot
- Some of the characters retained in the adaptation received some changes to them: Miss Pebmarsh is a mother, who lost two sons in the First World War, and has no relations to Sheila; Sheila has no family and thus she spent her youth in a home; Colin works as an intelligence officer for MI6 and not for Special Branch, while his surname is changed to Race, now making him a relation (specifically the son) of Colonel Race; Brent's first name is changed from Edna to Nora, while her murder happens close to the Cavendish Bureau rather than in Wilbraham Crescent; James and Edith Waterhouse become Matthew and Rachel Waterhouse, and are now Jews who fled from Germany to avoid persecution by the Nazis.
- Unlike the novel, Poirot is more involved in the case right from the beginning, when Colin seeks him out for help. He is thus present for the interviews with all the suspects and witnesses of the case, as well as examining Wilbraham Crescent, and both the Cavendish Bureau and its surroundings.
- The time of "4:13" is given more significance in that it hints to a hotel room that Sheila regularly visits under the cover of a work appointment, in order to conduct a secret love affair with a new role for the character of the boring professor – Professor Purdy. Miss Martindale knows of the affair and secretly despises it, and so uses this knowledge to help her to incriminate Sheila for the initial murder.
- Some clues and events were changed by the adaptation: the laundry van clue is now provided by Mrs Hemmings; Mr Bland does not go abroad to dispose of evidence; Sheila does not dispose of the Rosemary clock but rather holds on to it, as the clock came from a mother that she never knew; the murder weapon is planted on Sheila at the inquest, by Mrs Bland; Merlina's murder occurs in Dover, not London, and her body is found by Hardcastle and Jenkins, shortly after losing her when they tail her.
- Due to the change in setting, the novel's sub-plot had to be considerably modified to reflect this; while Miss Pebmarsh's involvement and the note clue are the only parts that were still retained, much of the rest was changed to have a connection to espionage prior to World War II:
  - Miss Pebmarsh is part of a small outfit seeking to weaken Britain in the event that it goes to war with Germany. Her motive for her actions is to prevent further loss of young life from warfare, after she lost her sons in the First World War. Unlike the novel, her scheme is uncovered prior to Poirot's denouement of the murders.
  - Annabel Larkin, Fiona Hanbury, and Christopher Mabbutt are new characters created for the modified sub-plot. While both Annabel and Mabbutt are co-conspirators in Pebmarsh's scheme – Annabel helps to smuggle out documents from Dover Castle where she works, so that Pebmarsh can make copies for Mabbut to take over to German agents during his regular trips to France – Fiona is the first individual to uncover the scheme after discovering Annabel's involvement in it. Both Annabel and Fiona are killed in a freak accident, caused inadvertently by a confrontation between the two women – Annabel learns she is found out and tries to prevent Fiona exposing her. Both women are run over by a car while struggling on the road at night.
  - In the adaptation, the note clue that Colin uses was created by Fiona which he took from her body at the local morgue, while his investigations do not take him out of the country unlike in the novel.
  - The sub-plot intertwines with the main plot in two places:- Colin's reasons for helping Sheila are fueled by a deep regret for failing to assist Fiona when she discovered Annabel's involvement in the smuggling, and thus not being there when she was killed; the investigation into the initial murder causes an argument to happen between Mabbutt and Pebmarsh that is misheard by Mrs Hemmings, but which Poirot realises was in regards to the documents they had copied that they needed to get past the police before they were discovered.
  - Miss Pebmarsh does not resist arrest, unlike in the novel where she does upon being found out.
  - The Waterhouses, who are now involved in the sub-plot, are wrongly accused by Colin of being involved in Pebmarsh's scheme. His mistake comes from the fact they were found to be German due to small mistakes in their English
- Some of the elements of Poirot's denouement of the case, are changed by the adaptation:
  - It occurs at the Cavendish Bureau and not at his hotel. The Blands, Miss Martindale, and Sheila are also present to hear it, unlike in the novel when it is just Hardcastle and Colin.
  - Mrs Bland confesses to her involvement in the crime during the denouement, rather than after being brought in for questioning by the police.
  - The Gregson story that is used as the basis for the crime is a published one in the adaptation, which Poirot remembers as having been full of clocks, misidentification and misdirection, with an innocent party framed and pushed to act irrationally so the police will become more suspicious.
  - Merlina and Mrs Bland are now known to each other; it is revealed that both worked together in the theatre.
- Whilst the murdered man is known as Quentin Duguesclin by the end of the novel, he is never named by anyone in the adaptation. Instead, Poirot simply reveals in his denouement that he is either the relative or friend of the first Mrs Bland. The knowledge of this is emphasised as being important to Poirot through a comment he makes to Hardcastle during their investigations – "I do not think it is important who he is, but who he is."

== Publication history ==
- 1963, Collins Crime Club (London), 7 November 1963, Hardcover, 256 pp
- 1964, Dodd Mead and Company (New York), Hardcover, 276 pp
- 1965, Pocket Books (New York), Paperback, 246 pp
- 1966, Fontana Books (Imprint of HarperCollins), Paperback, 221 pp
- 1969, Ulverscroft Large-print Edition, Hardcover, 417 pp ISBN 0-85456-666-X

The novel was first serialised in the UK weekly magazine Woman's Own in six abridged instalments from 9 November – 14 December 1963 with illustrations by Herb Tauss. It was advertised as being serialised prior to the publication of the book; however this had already appeared on 7 November. In the US a condensed version of the novel appeared in the January 1964 (Volume 156, Number 1) issue of Cosmopolitan with illustrations by Al Parker.
