= Hallowe'en Party =

1969 mystery novel by Agatha Christie

- Dust-jacket illustration of the first UK edition
- Author: Agatha Christie
- Language: English
- Genre: Crime fiction
- Publisher: Collins Crime Club
- Publication date: November 1969
- Publication place: United Kingdom
- Media type: Print (hardback & paperback)
- Pages: 256 (first edition, hardcover)
- Preceded by: Third Girl
- Followed by: Elephants Can Remember

Hallowe'en Party is a mystery novel by English writer Agatha Christie, first published in the United Kingdom by the Collins Crime Club in November 1969 and in the United States by Dodd, Mead and Company later in the same year. This book was dedicated to writer P. G. Wodehouse. It has been adapted for television, radio, and most recently for the film A Haunting in Venice (2023).

The novel features Belgian detective Hercule Poirot and the mystery novelist Ariadne Oliver. A boastful girl at a Hallowe'en party tells Mrs Oliver she once witnessed a murder; the same girl is later drowned in an apple-bobbing bucket, and Poirot must solve a two-pronged mystery: who killed the girl, and what, if anything, did she witness?

== Synopsis ==
While visiting her friend Judith Butler in Woodleigh Common, Ariadne Oliver assists the neighbours in planning a children's Hallowe'en Party at wealthy Rowena Drake's house. Upon meeting Mrs Oliver, 13-year-old Joyce Reynolds claims she once witnessed a murder, though at the time she was too young to recognise it as such. Though no one appears to believe her, Joyce is found drowned in an apple-bobbing bucket after the party; distraught, Mrs Oliver summons Hercule Poirot to solve the case.

With help from retired Superintendent Spence, Poirot makes a list of recent deaths and disappearances in the area of Woodleigh Common. Of these, three stand out as significant:

- Rowena's aunt, Mrs Llewellyn-Smythe, died suddenly, but of what was believed to be natural causes.
- Her au pair, Olga Seminoff, disappeared when a codicil that favoured her in her employer's will was found to be a forgery.
- Leslie Ferrier, a lawyer's clerk with unsavoury connections and prior convictions for forgery, was stabbed in the back by an unknown assailant.

Interviewing the townsfolk, Poirot learns a few interesting facts:

- Judith's daughter, Miranda, was Joyce's closest friend and the pair shared secrets.
- Joyce was known to lie to get attention.
- Elizabeth Whittaker, a mathematics teacher, witnessed Rowena become startled and drop a vase of water outside the library while the party-goers were playing snap-dragon.
- A one-time cleaner of Mrs Llewellyn-Smythe had been witness to her employer making the supposedly forged codicil.
- A beautiful garden built within an abandoned quarry was designed by Michael Garfield, a handsome narcissistic man, for Mrs Llewellyn-Smythe. He lived in a lodge in the grounds to oversee the work and still lives there.
- The victim's brother, Leopold Reynolds, has become flush with money of late.

Leopold is found dead. Rowena informs Poirot that she had seen him in the library the night of the party and she believes he witnessed his sister's murder.

Poirot advises the police to search the woods near the quarry. The search finds Olga's body in an abandoned well, stabbed in the same manner as Ferrier. Fearing another murder, Poirot sends a telegram to Mrs Oliver, instructing her to take Judith and her daughter to London.

Miranda meets Garfield, who takes her to a pagan sacrificial altar, intending to poison her. However he commits suicide when two youths recruited by Poirot save Miranda's life. Miranda reveals that she was the one who saw Garfield and Rowena drag Olga's body through the quarry garden and she told Joyce. Miranda had not been present at the preparations for the party so Joyce tried to seek famous Ariadne's attention by claiming Miranda's story as her own.

Poirot lays out the solution to Mrs Oliver and Mrs Butler. Rowena began an affair with Garfield while her dying husband was still alive. Disgusted by this, Rowena's aunt wrote a codicil that left her fortune to Olga. The lovers then plotted to discredit Olga's claim, hiring Ferrier to replace the codicil with a deliberately clumsy forgery to ensure Rowena inherited everything; the real codicil has now been found by the police. Both Olga and Ferrier were murdered to conceal the deceit, but Rowena suspected someone had witnessed the disposal of Olga's body. Rowena killed Joyce when she claimed she had witnessed a murder, unaware that Joyce had appropriated Miranda's story. The dropping of the vase, which Mrs Whittaker witnessed, was to disguise the fact that Rowena was already wet from drowning Joyce. Leopold was murdered because he asked Rowena for money and she suspected he knew something.

Poirot muses that Rowena likely would have shared a similar fate to Olga, as Garfield's motivation for the murder was his obsession with constructing a second, more perfect garden. Once he had Rowena's money, he would soon have no more need of her, as she had already provided him with a Greek island.

Poirot also reveals that Judith is not really a widow. She once had a brief affair with Michael Garfield and Miranda is the child of that union. The Butlers met Michael again by chance years later; though fond of Miranda, Michael was willing to kill his own child to satisfy his need to create. Satisfied with Poirot's help, Judith thanks him.

== Characters ==
- Hercule Poirot – Belgian detective, asked to help investigate the murder of Joyce Reynolds by his friend Mrs Oliver.
- Ariadne Oliver – mystery writer and Poirot's friend.
- Alfred Richmond – Chief Constable of the local police.
- Dr Ferguson – local physician and the appointed police surgeon.
- Joyce Reynolds – first victim of the case. A thirteen-year-old girl attending Rowena's Halloween party.
- Olga Seminoff – an au pair girl from Herzegovina.
- Mrs Llewellyn-Smythe – a wealthy widow.
- Leslie Ferrier – a local solicitor's clerk, murdered before the start of the novel.
- Janet White – a local teacher, dead from strangulation before the start of the novel.
- Leopold Reynolds – second victim of the case. Joyce's younger brother.
- Rowena Drake – Mrs Llewellyn-Smythe's niece.
- Miranda Butler – a twelve-year-old girl who was ill and unable to attend the party.
- Judith Butler – Mrs Oliver's friend and mother of Miranda.
- Ann Reynolds – Joyce's and Leopold's older sister.
- Mrs Reynolds – Joyce's and Leopold's mother.
- Michael Garfield – a landscape gardener, recently returned to the area.
- Elizabeth Whittaker – a teacher of mathematics and Latin at The Elms school.
- Miss Emlyn – headmistress of The Elms school.
- Mrs Goodbody – a local cleaning woman, attending the party in the role of a witch.
- Jeremy Fullerton – Mrs Llewellyn-Smythe's solicitor and the employer of Ferrier.
- Nicholas Ransom – an 18-year-old, who attended the party.
- Desmond Holland – a 16-year-old, who attended the party.
- Harriet Leaman – Mrs Llewellyn-Smythe's former cleaner.
- George – Poirot's faithful valet.
- Superintendent Spence – a retired police officer.
- Elspeth McKay – Superintendent Spence's sister.

== Literary significance and reception ==
Contemporaneous reviews were largely negative, though tempered by an appreciation of Christie's advanced years. Author and academic Robert Barnard, who in 1980 wrote a monograph on Christie, stated, "The plot of this late one is not too bad, but the telling is very poor: it is littered with loose ends, unrealised characters, and maintains only a marginal hold on the reader's interest. Much of it reads as if spoken into a tape-recorder and never read through afterward." Christie did sometimes use a dictaphone when writing. According to her grandson, "She used to dictate her stories into a machine called a dictaphone and then a secretary typed this up into a typescript, which my grandmother would correct by hand."

Robert Weaver in the Toronto Daily Star of 13 December 1969 wrote "Hallowe'en Party...is a disappointment, but with all her accomplishments Miss Christie can be forgiven some disappointments...Poirot seems weary and so does the book."

Critical reassessment in more recent years has led to more favourable reviews, however. In Poirot: The Greatest Detective in the World, a 2020 non-fiction study of every Poirot novel for the character's centennial, Mark Aldridge describes Hallowe'en Party as "a highly memorable and intriguing novel that makes a lasting impression on the reader." While commenting on the novel's flaws, such as unresolved story threads and an "unusually underwritten murderer", Aldridge writes it has "an energetic and exciting opening, one excellent clue hiding in plain sight, and a tone of grim fascination towards the murder throughout." He notes how Christie was downbeat about what she perceived as rising cruelty and criminality in the wider world and that she read reports on current crime as a part of her inspiration.

== References and allusions ==
=== References to other works ===
- Superintendent Spence brought to Poirot the case solved in Mrs McGinty's Dead, which they discuss in Chapter 5. The case is recollected by Poirot in Chapter 3 when Poirot recalls Mrs Oliver getting out of a car and "a bag of apples breaking". This is a reference to her second appearance in Mrs McGinty's Dead, Chapter 10.
- Miss Emlyn mentions in Chapter 10 that she knows of Poirot from Miss Bulstrode, who previously appeared as a character in Cat Among the Pigeons.
- When Joyce suggests to Ariadne Oliver in Chapter 1 that she should have themed the party around a fake murder in honour of her presence, Ariadne replies "never again". This is a reference to Dead Man's Folly, an earlier Poirot novel where she is asked to write a fake murder for a charity fête that turns into a real one.
- A letter was sent to Hercule Poirot from Mr Goby, who appeared in The Mystery of the Blue Train, After the Funeral, and Third Girl.
- Mrs Goodbody, a rich source of local insight, uses a well-known children's rhyme to express her view of the likely fate of Olga, when Poirot asks her in Chapter 16: "Ding dong dell, pussy's in the well".
- There are several allusions to classical, Biblical, and literary characters in this book:
  - Mrs Rowena Drake is compared to Lady Macbeth.
  - The thin, blonde Mrs Butler is frequently compared to Undine.
  - Mrs Butler and Mrs Oliver reflect upon the differences between their own lives and those of their namesakes (Judith and Ariadne, respectively).
  - Miranda and Mrs Butler reference the story of Jael and Sisera when discussing how different people might commit a murder.
  - Michael Garfield is referred to as both Narcissus and Satan/Lucifer.
  - Michael Garfield also titles his sketch of Miranda as Iphigenia, reflecting his plan.

=== References to actual history, geography and current science ===
- The first half of the novel contains several discussions in which anxiety is voiced about the criminal justice system in Great Britain. This in part reflects the abolition in 1965 of capital punishment for murder.
- The novel reflects in many respects its time of publication at the end of the permissive 1960s, but nowhere more so than when a character uses the word "lesbian" in Chapter 15.
- Mrs Llewellyn-Smythe placed her codicil in a book titled Enquire Within upon Everything, a real book of domestic tips published from 1856 to 1994.

== Publication history ==
- 1969, Collins Crime Club (London), November 1969, Hardback, 256 pp
- 1969, Dodd Mead and Company (New York), 1969, Hardback, 248 pp
- 1970, Pocket Books (New York), Paperback, 185 pp
- 1972, Fontana Books (Imprint of HarperCollins), Paperback, 189 pp
- 1987, Ulverscroft Large-print Edition, Hardcover, ISBN 0-7089-1666-X
- 2009, HarperCollins; Facsimile edition, Hardcover: 256 pages, ISBN 978-0-00-731462-1
- 2023, HarperCollins; Paperback: 266 pages, ISBN 978-0-00-861938-1 (Retitled A Haunting in Venice to match the 2023 Branagh film)

The novel was first serialised in the weekly magazine Woman's Own in seven abridged instalments from 15 November to 27 December 1969, illustrated with uncredited photographic montages.

In the US, the novel appeared in the December 1969 issue of Cosmopolitan magazine.

== Adaptations ==
=== Radio ===
Hallowe'en Party was adapted for radio and broadcast on BBC Radio 4 on 30 October 1993, featuring John Moffatt as Hercule Poirot, with Stephanie Cole as Ariadne Oliver.

=== Television ===
British

The novel was adapted as part of the twelfth series of Agatha Christie's Poirot with David Suchet, with Zoë Wanamaker reprising her role as Ariadne Oliver. Guest stars include Deborah Findlay as Rowena Drake, Julian Rhind-Tutt as Michael Garfield, Amelia Bullmore as Judith Butler, and Fenella Woolgar as Elizabeth Whittaker. Charles Palmer (who also directed The Clocks for the series) directs this instalment, with the screenplay written by Mark Gatiss (who wrote the screenplay for Cat Among the Pigeons; he also appeared as a guest star in the adaptation of Appointment with Death).

The television adaptation shifted the late 1960s setting to the 1930s, as with nearly all episodes in this series, and changed a number of the fates and details of the characters, but is otherwise faithful to the novel.

French

The novel was adapted as a 2014 episode of the French television series Les Petits Meurtres d'Agatha Christie.

=== Graphic novel ===
Hallowe'en Party was released by HarperCollins as a graphic novel adaptation on 3 November 2008, adapted and illustrated by "Chandre" (ISBN 0-00-728054-8).

=== Film ===
The novel was loosely adapted by Kenneth Branagh in 2023 for his third Poirot film, re-titled A Haunting in Venice and relocated from England to the titular city. The film followed Branagh's previous Poirot adaptations Murder on the Orient Express (2017) and Death on the Nile (2022).

== See also ==
- Bibliography of Halloween
