= Third Girl =

1966 Poirot novel by Agatha Christie

- Dust-jacket illustration of the first UK edition
- Author: Agatha Christie
- Cover artist: Kenneth Farnhill
- Language: English
- Series: Hercule Poirot
- Genre: Crime novel
- Publisher: Collins Crime Club
- Publication date: November 1966
- Publication place: United Kingdom
- Media type: Print (hardback & paperback)
- Pages: 256 (first edition, hardcover)
- Preceded by: The Clocks
- Followed by: Hallowe'en Party

Third Girl is a mystery novel by the English writer Agatha Christie, first published in the UK by the Collins Crime Club in November 1966 and in the US by Dodd, Mead and Company the following year. The UK edition retailed at eighteen shillings (18/-) and the US edition at $4.50.

It features her Belgian detective Hercule Poirot and the recurring character Ariadne Oliver. The novel is notable for being the first in many years in which Poirot is present from beginning to end. It is uncommon in that the investigation includes discovering the first crime, which happens comparatively late in the novel.

== Plot summary ==
Norma Restarick seeks help from Poirot, believing she may have committed murder. When she sees him in person, she flees, saying he is too old. He pursues the case finding that Ariadne Oliver sent Norma to him. He believes there is a murder that prompted Norma's fears. Poirot and Mrs Oliver gather information, visiting her parents’ home and her apartment building. Norma does not return home after a weekend visit to her father and stepmother. Mrs Oliver finds her in a café by chance with her boyfriend David. Poirot meets Norma at the café, where she mentions the death again. After describing the odd times where she cannot recall what has happened she leaves in fear again. Mrs Oliver trails David, ending up in the hospital after being coshed on the head upon leaving his art studio. Poirot arranges for psychiatrist Dr Stillingfleet to follow Norma; he pulls her to safety from a close call with speeding traffic and brings her to his place for treatment and for safety.

Norma's father Andrew abandoned her and her mother Grace when Norma was about 5 years old. Andrew had run off with a woman in a relationship that ended soon after. He travelled in Africa in financially successful ventures. Norma lived with her mother until Grace's death two and a half years before. Andrew returned to England after his brother Simon died a year earlier, to work in the family firm, arriving with a new young wife, Mary. Norma can recognise nothing familiar in this man, but accepts him. Norma is the third girl in her flat in the fashion of young women advertising for a third girl to share the rent. The main tenant, Claudia, is secretary to her newfound father; the other girl, Frances, travels often for the art gallery that employs her.

Mrs Oliver learns that a woman in the apartment building had recently died by falling from her window. A week passes before she tells Poirot, who feels this is what bothers Norma. The woman was Louise Charpentier. Norma says that her father ran off with Louise Birell. Later, Mrs Oliver finds a piece of paper linking Louise Charpentier to Andrew. Mary Restarick has been ill from poison in her food. Sir Roderick engages Poirot to find documents missing from his files which brings young Sonia under suspicion.

Norma is lured from Dr Stillingfleet by an ad in the newspaper to meet David, and is again drugged. Frances kills David. She sets it up to appear that Norma did it, but the blood on the knife was congealed when Norma found herself holding it. With police and family gathered in the flat, Poirot announces that Andrew did die in Africa. Robert Orwell is posing as her father to gain the wealth of the family. He had David paint portraits of him and his late wife in the style of a painter popular 20 years earlier as part of the ruse. Most cruelly, he and his wife have been giving Norma various drugs that give her hallucinations and an altered sense of time, to set her up as guilty. Further, the wife had poisoned herself hoping to pin that on Norma, too. Louise wrote to Andrew on learning he was back in England, so Frances killed Louise; this is the murder Norma feared she did. The woman posing as her stepmother was also Frances, who used a blonde wig to cover her dark hair when changing roles. Poirot takes the wig from her bag to make that point. Murder of the two who could expose the imposters was just one of her crimes. Sonia is exonerated when she finds the papers Sir Roderick misplaced, and the two will marry. Poirot had chosen Dr Stillingfleet to help him with Norma in hopes the two would marry, and they will.

== Characters ==
- Hercule Poirot: renowned Belgian detective
- Ariadne Oliver: Poirot's friend, the celebrated author of detective stories
- Miss Felicity Lemon: Poirot's secretary
- George: Poirot's valet
- Chief Inspector Neele: Poirot's police source and investigator for second murder
- Sergeant Conolly: a policeman in the case
- Dr John Stillingfleet: a physician and psychiatrist
- Mr Goby: he leads network of people gathering data for Poirot
- David Baker: Norma's boyfriend.
- Miss Battersby: former principal of Meadowfield School
- Robert Orwell: a man who met Andrew Restarick on a project in Africa, and later poses as Andrew

Residing at Sir Roderick's home at Long Basing:

- Sir Roderick Horsfield: past age 65, once active in WWII intelligence, writing his memoirs, maternal uncle to brothers Simon (died one year earlier) and Andrew Restarick
- Sonia: Sir Roderick's personal assistant, young woman from Herzegovina
- Andrew Restarick: Norma's father, not seen since she was 5 years old, apparently returned a year ago.
- Mary Restarick: Andrew's young blonde second wife and Norma's stepmother.

Residing at Borodene Mansions:

- Claudia Reece-Holland: holds the lease of the flat #67 where Norma lives, secretary to her father, and daughter to an MP
- Frances Cary: flatmate of Norma and Claudia
- Norma Restarick: young woman about 19 or 20 years old, the third girl in the flat.
- Mrs Louise Birell Charpentier: woman in mid 40s, recently died of fall from #76
- Miss Jacobs: older woman, neighbour to Claudia, and had unit below that of Louise.

== Literary significance and reception ==
Maurice Richardson in The Observer of 13 November 1966 concluded, "There is the usual double-take surprise solution centring round a perhaps rather artificial identity problem; but the suspense holds up all the way. Dialogue and characters are lively as flies. After this, I shan't be a bit surprised to see A.C. wearing a mini-skirt."

Robert Barnard: "One of Christie's more embarrassing attempts to haul herself abreast of the swinging 'sixties. Mrs Oliver plays a large part, detection a small one."

== References to other works ==
The novel reintroduces Stillingfleet, a character from the short story The Dream and first published in book form in the UK in The Adventure of the Christmas Pudding in 1960, and Mr Goby, whose previous appearance had been in After the Funeral in 1953.

In Chapter 4, while Poirot is pretending he shares a military history with Sir Roderick, he makes reference to Colonel Race from novels such as Death on the Nile and Cards on the Table, as well as Inspector Giraud from Murder on the Links.

== Adaptations for television ==
British

A television adaptation by Peter Flannery for the series Agatha Christie's Poirot starring David Suchet as Poirot and Zoë Wanamaker as Ariadne Oliver was filmed in April and May 2008. It aired on 28 September 2008 on ITV. It contains significant alterations to the plot, including doing away with the character of Dr. Stillingfleet and with David's death, so that David ends up with Norma. They also cut the stepmother subplot and have Claudia be Andrew/Robert's secretary; she wishes to marry him, and he makes her an unwitting accomplice. Instead of drugging Norma to make her appear insane, Frances and Robert/Andrew play upon her own anxiety and PTSD related to finding her mother after she committed suicide when Norma was young. The murder that starts everything is of Norma's old nanny, rather than Andrew's mistress, although the motive is the same; it is made to appear as if she committed suicide in a similar method to Norma's mother, which brings back Norma's childhood trauma and guilt over not being able to save her. Finally, Frances is revealed to be Norma’s half-sister. The adaptation is set in 1937 rather than the 1960s.

French

The novel was also adapted as a 2017 episode of the French television series Les Petits Meurtres d'Agatha Christie.

== Publication history ==
- 1966, Collins Crime Club (London), November 1966, Hardcover, 256 pp
- 1967, Dodd Mead and Company (New York), 1967, Hardcover, 248 pp
- 1968, Ulverscroft Large-print Edition, Hardcover, 230 pp
- 1968, Fontana Books (Imprint of HarperCollins), Paperback, 190 pp
- 1968, Pocket Books (New York), Paperback
- 1979, Greenway edition of collected works (William Collins), Hardcover, ISBN 0-00-231847-4
- 2011, Harper paperbacks, 271 pp, ISBN 978-0062073761

=== Magazine publication ===
In the US a condensed version of the novel appeared in the April 1967 (Volume 128, Number 6) issue of Redbook magazine with a photographic montage by Mike Cuesta.

=== International titles ===
This novel has been translated to various languages other than its original English. Over 20 are listed here. This is in keeping with the author's reputation for being the most translated author.

- Arabic: ألفتاة الثالثه
- Bulgarian: Третото момиче /Tretoto momiche/
- Croatian: Treća djevojka
- Czech: Třetí dívka
- Danish: Den tredje pige
- Dutch: Het derde meisje
- Finnish: Kolmas tyttö
- French: La Troisième Fille
- Georgian: მესამე გოგონა
- German: Die vergessliche Mörderin
- Greek: Το χαμόγελο της Μέδουσας
- Hungarian: Harmadik lány and A harmadik lány
- Indonesian: Gadis Ketiga
- Italian: Sono un'assassina?
- Japanese: 第三の女 (translated by Fusa OBI/小尾芙佐)
- Norwegian: Den tredje piken
- Persian: دختر سوم
- Polish: Trzecia lokatorka
- Portuguese (Brazil): A Terceira Moça
- Portuguese (Portugal): Poirot e a Terceira Inquilina, later edition A Suspeita
- Romanian: A treia fată
- Russian: Третья девушка
- Spanish: Tercera Muchacha
- Swedish: Tredje Flickan
- Turkish: Üçüncü kız
