= Elephants Can Remember =

1972 mystery novel by Agatha Christie

- Dust-jacket illustration of the first UK edition
- Author: Agatha Christie
- Language: English
- Genre: Crime novel
- Publisher: Collins Crime Club
- Publication date: November 1972
- Publication place: United Kingdom
- Media type: Print (hardback & paperback)
- Pages: 256 (first edition, hardcover)
- ISBN: 0-00-231210-7
- OCLC: 694646
- Dewey Decimal: 823/.9/12
- LC Class: PZ3.C4637 El4 PR6005.H66
- Preceded by: Hallowe'en Party
- Followed by: Poirot's Early Cases (short stories)

Elephants Can Remember is a mystery novel by British writer Agatha Christie, first published in 1972. It features her Belgian detective Hercule Poirot and the recurring character Ariadne Oliver. This was the last novel to feature the latter and was succeeded by Curtain: Poirot's Last Case, which had been written in the early 1940s but was published last. Elephants Can Remember concentrates on memory and oral testimony.

== Plot summary ==
At a literary luncheon, Ariadne Oliver is approached by a woman named Mrs Burton-Cox, whose son Desmond is engaged to Oliver's goddaughter Celia Ravenscroft. Mrs Burton-Cox questions the truth regarding the deaths of Celia's parents. Twelve years before, Oliver's close school friend Margaret Ravenscroft and her husband, General Alistair Ravenscroft, were found shot to death near their manor house in Overcliffe, with a revolver found between their bodies, bearing only their fingerprints. The investigation into their deaths found it impossible to determine if it was a double suicide, or if one of them murdered the other and then committed suicide. Their deaths left Celia and another child orphaned. After consulting Celia, Oliver invites her friend Hercule Poirot to resolve the issue.

Poirot and Oliver proceed to meet elderly witnesses associated with the case, whom they dub "elephants", and discover that Margaret owned four wigs; that the Ravenscrofts' dog was devoted to the family, but bit Margaret a few days before her death; that Margaret had an identical twin sister, Dorothea, who had spent time in a number of psychiatric nursing homes, and was believed to have been involved in two violent incidents in Asia, including the drowning of her infant son after the death of her husband; and that a month before the couple died, Dorothea had been sleepwalking and had died after falling off a cliff. Later Poirot learns the names of governesses who served the Ravenscroft family, one of whom, Zélie Meauhourat, travelled to Lausanne after the couple's deaths.

Poirot soon turns his attention to the Burton-Cox family and learns that Desmond was adopted and knows nothing about his birth mother. Through his agent, Mr Goby, Poirot learns that Desmond is the illegitimate son of a deceased actress, Kathleen Fenn, who once had an affair with Mrs Burton-Cox's husband and who bequeathed a considerable fortune to Desmond, to be held in trust until he was of age or had married but which would go to his adoptive mother if he died. Poirot suspects that Mrs Burton-Cox wants to prevent the marriage of Desmond and Celia in order to maintain the use of the money, but he finds no suggestion that Mrs Burton-Cox wishes to kill her son. Eventually he begins to suspect the truth about the Ravenscrofts' deaths and asks Zélie to return to England to help him explain it to Desmond and Celia.

Poirot reveals that the woman who died with Alistair was not his wife but her twin, Dorothea. A month before the deaths, she had fatally injured Margaret, and Margaret had made her husband promise to protect her sister from arrest. Alistair had Zélie help him conceal the truth of his wife's death by planting her body at the foot of a cliff, fabricating the story that it was Dorothea who had died, and then having Dorothea take the place of his wife. While she fooled the Ravenscrofts' servants, the family dog could not be deceived and thus bit her. A month after his wife's death, Alistair murdered Dorothea to prevent her from killing anyone else, making certain that she held the revolver before she was killed, and then he committed suicide. Knowing the facts, Desmond and Celia can face the future together.

== Characters ==
- Hercule Poirot, the Belgian detective
- Ariadne Oliver, a celebrated author
- Chief Superintendent Garroway, the investigating officer, now retired
- Superintendent Spence, a retired police officer
- Mr Goby, a private investigator
- Celia Ravenscroft, daughter of the victims and one of Mrs Oliver's many godchildren
- Desmond Burton-Cox, Celia's boyfriend
- Mrs Burton-Cox, Desmond's avaricious adoptive mother
- Dr Willoughby, a psychiatrist specialising in twins
- Mademoiselle Rouselle, a former governess to the Ravenscroft family
- Zélie Meauhourat, another former governess to the Ravenscroft family

The "Elephants"

- The Honourable Julia Carstairs, a social acquaintance of the Ravenscrofts
- Mrs Matcham, a former nursemaid to the Ravenscroft family
- Mrs Buckle, a former cleaner to the Ravenscrofts
- Mrs Rosentelle, a hairstylist and former wigmaker

== Literary significance and reception ==
Maurice Richardson in The Observer of 5 November 1972 called the novel "A quiet but consistently interesting whodunnit with ingenious monozygotic solution. Any young elephant would be proud to have written it."

Other critics were less kind. Robert Barnard called the novel "Another murder-in-the-past case, with nobody able to remember anything clearly, including, alas, the author. At one time we are told that General Ravenscroft and his wife (the dead pair) were respectively sixty and thirty-five; later we are told he had fallen in love with his wife's twin sister 'as a young man'. The murder/suicide is once said to have taken place ten to twelve years before, elsewhere fifteen or twenty. Acres of meandering conversations, hundreds of speeches beginning with 'Well, …' That sort of thing may happen in life, but one doesn't want to read it." According to The Cambridge Guide to Women's Writing in English, this novel is one of the "execrable last novels" in which Christie "loses her grip altogether".

Elephants Can Remember was cited in a study done in 2009 using computer science to compare Christie's earlier works to her later ones. The sharp drops in size of vocabulary and the increases in repeated phrases and indefinite nouns suggested that Christie may have been suffering from some form of late-onset dementia, perhaps Alzheimer's disease.

== References to other works ==
- The character of Superintendent Spence previously appeared in Taken at the Flood, Mrs McGinty's Dead and Hallowe'en Party. The last two of these cases are discussed in Chapter 5 of the novel, along with the case retold in Five Little Pigs.
- Mr Goby is a recurring character in many of the later Poirot novels. Although he does not appear in the previous novel, Hallowe'en Party, he is mentioned as having contributed to that investigation in Chapter 21 of that novel.
- In Chapter 3 Mrs Oliver fondly recalls a copy of the book Enquire Within upon Everything that had been owned by her Aunt Alice. This is also the book in a copy of which a will is found concealed in Hallowe'en Party.

== Adaptations ==
=== Television ===
The novel was adapted into a TV film with David Suchet as Poirot, as an episode in the final series of Agatha Christie's Poirot. It was broadcast on ITV on 9 June 2013, and later on the Acorn TV website on 11 August 2014, over a year later. Zoë Wanamaker returned to the role of Ariadne Oliver, marking her fifth out of six appearances on the show in total. Greta Scacchi (Mrs Burton-Cox), Vanessa Kirby (Celia Ravenscroft), Iain Glen (Dr Willoughby) and Ferdinand Kingsley (Desmond Burton-Cox) were also among the cast.

The adaptation includes some significant additions to the plot, including a new storyline involving Dorothea's daughter Marie seeking to avenge what she sees as the brutal psychiatric treatments used on her mother, including electroconvulsive therapy and "hydriation" (repeated exposure to very hot and very cold water). The story is also moved from the early 1970s to the late 1930s. This leads to an anachronism when there are references to chemotherapy as a cure for cancer.

=== Radio ===
Elephants Can Remember was adapted for radio by BBC Radio 4 in 2006, featuring John Moffatt as Poirot and Julia Mackenzie as Ariadne Oliver.

== Publication history ==
- 1972, Collins Crime Club (London), November 1972, Hardcover, 256 pp
- 1972, Dodd Mead and Company (New York), Hardcover, 243 pp
- 1973, Dell Books, Paperback, 237 pp
- 1973 GK Hall & Company Large-print Edition, Hardcover, 362 pp ISBN 0-8161-6086-4
- 1975, Fontana Books (Imprint of HarperCollins), Paperback, 160 pp
- 1978, Greenway edition of collected works (William Collins), Hardcover, 256 pp
- 1979, Greenway edition of collected works (Dodd Mead), Hardcover, 256 pp

The novel was serialised in the Star Weekly Novel, a Toronto newspaper supplement, in two abridged instalments from 10 to 17 February 1973 with each issue containing the same cover illustration by Laszlo Gal.

== See also ==
- 1972 in literature
