= Marco Valerio Editore =

Italian publishing company

Edizioni Marco Valerio was founded in Turin, Italy, on 1 August 2000, as an academic publishing house. It has specialized in humanities titles, with special attention to linguistics, philosophy, and gnosis.

The company has a particular interest in producing texts for visually impaired people, including large print books in Italian, English and French.
