= Death in the Clouds =

1935 mystery novel by Agatha Christie

- Dust-jacket illustration of the US edition. See Publication history (below) for UK first edition jacket image.
- Author: Agatha Christie
- Language: English
- Series: Hercule Poirot
- Genre: Crime novel
- Publisher: Dodd, Mead and Company
- Publication date: 10 March 1935
- Publication place: United Kingdom
- Media type: Print (hardback & paperback)
- Pages: 304 (first edition, hardcover)
- Preceded by: Three Act Tragedy
- Followed by: The A.B.C. Murders

Death in the Clouds is a mystery novel by British writer Agatha Christie, published in 1935. It features the Belgian detective Hercule Poirot and Chief Inspector Japp. It is a "closed circle" murder mystery: the victim is a passenger on a cross-Channel aircraft flight, and the perpetrator can only be one of eleven fellow-passengers and cabin crew.

The book was first published in the US by Dodd, Mead and Company on 10 March 1935 under the title of Death in the Air, and in the UK by the Collins Crime Club in July of the same year under Christie's original title. The US edition retailed at $2.00, and the UK edition at 7/6 (seven shillings and sixpence).

== Synopsis ==
Hercule Poirot travels back to England on the midday flight from Le Bourget Airfield in Paris to Croydon Airport in London. He is one of eleven passengers in the plane's rear compartment. The others include mystery writer Daniel Clancy; French archaeologists Armand Dupont and his son Jean; dentist Norman Gale; Doctor Bryant; French moneylender Madame Giselle; businessman James Ryder; Cicely, Countess of Horbury; the Honourable Venetia Kerr; and Jane Grey, a hairdresser. As the plane is close to landing, a wasp is spotted flying around the rear compartment before a steward finds that Giselle is dead. Poirot, who has slept through most of the flight, dismisses the belief she died from a wasp sting. Instead, he points out a dart on the floor, which is found to have a poisoned tip: Giselle was stung in the neck with it. The question remains how she was murdered without anyone noticing.

The police find a small blowpipe in the side of Poirot's seat. Annoyed at being identified as a suspect, he vows to clear his name and solve the case. Requesting a list of the passengers' possessions, he notes something that intrigues him but doesn't say what it is or to which passenger it refers. Aided by Jane in the investigation, Poirot works with Inspector Japp in England and Inspector Fournier in France. Clues gradually emerge: the victim had two coffee spoons with her cup and saucer; the blowpipe was bought in Paris by an American man; Lady Horbury had been cut off from her husband's money, and is one of Giselle's debtors; Giselle sometimes employed blackmail to ensure that her debtors did not miss their repayments; only the stewards and Clancy passed by the victim on the flight; and Lady Horbury's maid was on the flight after asking to be on it at the last moment.

Poirot pursues his enquiries in both London and Paris. On a flight to Paris, he conducts an experiment that shows that the use of the blowpipe, or anything similar, would have been noticed by the other passengers. It subsequently emerges that Giselle has an estranged daughter, Anne Morisot, who now stands to inherit her fortune. Poirot meets Anne and learns that she has an American or Canadian husband, whom she married a month earlier. Poirot afterwards comments that he feels that he has seen Anne before. When Jane makes a remark about needing to file a nail, he realises that Anne was Lady Horbury's maid Madeleine – he had seen her come into the rear compartment during the flight when Lady Horbury summoned her to fetch a dressing-case. He immediately instructs Fournier to find Anne. French police discover her body on the boat-train to Boulogne, with a bottle beside it: she appears to have poisoned herself.

Poirot makes his dénouement of the case in the presence of Japp, Gale, and Clancy. Giselle's killer was Norman Gale, who sought her fortune. The murder was carefully planned: Gale had brought his dentist's coat on the flight, which he changed into after some time to pose as a steward, knowing no-one would pay attention to such a person. Under the guise of delivering a spoon to Giselle, he stabbed her with the dart, then removed his coat and returned to his seat before the body was found. Anne's murder was part of the plan – Gale married her when he learned she was Giselle's daughter, intending to kill her at a later date in Canada, after she had received her mother's estate, and having ensured that he would in turn inherit the money from her. However, he had to kill her earlier than planned because she claimed her inheritance on the same day that Poirot met her.

The wasp that buzzed around in the rear compartment was released from a matchbox that Gale brought with him: both the empty matchbox and his coat had aroused Poirot's suspicions when he read the list of passengers' possessions. Both the wasp and the blowpipe, which Gale planted in the cabin, were intended to mislead. Gale denies Poirot's theory, but after Poirot lies to him about the police finding his fingerprints on the bottle that contained the poison, he inadvertently lets slip that he wore gloves in Anne's murder. Gale is arrested. Afterwards, Poirot pairs off Jane with Jean Dupont, who had fallen in love with her during the case.

== Reception ==
The Times Literary Supplement of 4 July 1935 summarized thus: "Any of the other nine passengers and two stewards could be suspected. And all of them were, including Clancy, the writer of detective stories, whom the author evidently enjoys making absurd. It will be a very acute reader who does not receive a complete surprise at the end."

The Times in its main paper gave the book a second review in its issue of 2 July 1935 when they described its plot as "ingenious" and commented on the fact that Christie had evolved a method of presenting a crime in a confined space (with reference to The Mystery of the Blue Train and Murder on the Orient Express) which "however often employed, never loses its originality."

Isaac Anderson in The New York Times Book Review of 24 March 1935 began his column:

Murder by poisoned dart, such as primitive savages blow from blow-guns, ceased long ago to be a novelty in detective fiction, and murder in an airplane is by way of becoming almost as common as murder behind the locked doors of a library, but the combination of poisoned dart and plane is probably unique. Not that such minor matters are of the slightest consequence to the reader; the main thing is that this is an Agatha Christie story, featuring Hercule Poirot, who is, by his own admission, the world's greatest detective. ... This is a crime puzzle of the first quality, and a mighty entertaining story besides.

In The Observer's issue of 30 June 1935, "Torquemada" (Edward Powys Mathers) started his review, "My admiration for Mrs. Christie is such that with each new book of hers I strain every mental nerve to prove that she has failed, at last, to hypnotize me. On finishing Death in the Clouds, I found that she had succeeded even more triumphantly than usual." He concluded, "I hope that some readers of this baffling case will foresee at least the false denouement. I did not even do that. Agatha Christie has recently developed two further tricks: one is, as of the juggler who keeps on dropping things, to leave a clue hanging out for several chapters, apparently unremarked by her little detective though seized on by us, and then to tuck it back again as unimportant. Another is to give us some, but by no means all, of the hidden thoughts of her characters. We readers must guard against these new dexterities. As for Poirot, it is only to him and to Cleopatra that a certain remark about age and custom is strictly applicable. But might not Inspector Japp be allowed to mellow a little, with the years, beyond the moron stage?"

An admirer of Christie, Milward Kennedy of The Guardian began his review of 30 July 1935, "Very few authors achieve the ideal blend of puzzle and entertainment as often does Agatha Christie." He did admit that, "Death in the Clouds may not rank with her greatest achievements, but it is far above the average detective story." He finished by saying, "Mrs Christie provides a little gallery of thumb-nail sketches of plausible characters; she gives us all the clues and even tells us where to look for them; we ought to find the murderer by reason, but are not likely to succeed except by guesswork."

A review in the Daily Mirror of 20 July 1935 concluded, "We leave Poirot to figure it all out. He is at it and in it, with his usual brilliance, till the end."

Robert Barnard: "Exceptionally lively specimen, with wider than usual class and type-range of suspects. Scrupulously fair, with each clue presented openly and discussed. Note Clancy the crime writer, and the superiority of French police to British (no signs of insularity here)."

== Main characters ==
- Hercule Poirot, Belgian private detective. Passenger on the aeroplane.
- Jane Grey, hairdresser. Passenger on the aeroplane.
- Cicely, Countess of Horbury (née Bland). Passenger on the aeroplane. In debt to Madame Giselle.
- Norman Gale, a dentist. Passenger on the aeroplane.
- The Hon. Venetia Kerr. Passenger on the aeroplane.
- Roger Bryant, a doctor. Passenger on the aeroplane.
- Armand Dupont, an archaeologist. Passenger on the aeroplane.
- Jean Dupont, his son and companion on the aeroplane.
- Daniel Clancy, author of detective novels. Passenger on the aeroplane.
- Henry Mitchell, steward on the aeroplane.
- Albert Davis, Mitchell's assistant.
- Inspector Japp of Scotland Yard, officially investigates the case.
- Fournier, a Sûreté detective.
- Elise Grandier, Madame Giselle's maid.
- Anne Morisot, a.k.a. Richards. On the flight as "Madeleine", Lady Horbury's maid; daughter of Madame Giselle, arrives from Canada.

== References or allusions ==
=== References to other works ===
- In Chapter 6, Monsieur Fournier makes reference to Monsieur Giraud, the French detective whom Poirot meets in Murder on the Links.
- In Chapter 7, Poirot refers to a case of poisoning in which the killer uses a "psychological" moment to his advantage, an allusion to Three Act Tragedy.
- In Chapter 21, Poirot refers to a case in which all the suspects were lying, an allusion to Murder on the Orient Express.

=== References in other works ===
- In Chapter 12 of a later Poirot novel, Mrs McGinty's Dead (1952), Christie's alter ego, Ariadne Oliver, refers to a novel of hers in which she made a blowpipe one foot long, only to be told later that they were six feet long. This was a belated but sly and self-referential acknowledgement of a fundamental error in the plot of Death in the Clouds.

=== Allusions to real life ===
- An event experienced by Christie herself, shortly after her second marriage (to Sir Max Mallowan), and described in her Autobiography, is alluded to in Chapter 13. "Imagine, in a little hotel in Syria was an Englishman whose wife had been taken ill. He himself had to be somewhere in Iraq by a certain date. Eh bien, would you believe it, he left his wife and went on so as to be on duty in time? And both he and his wife thought that quite natural; they thought him noble, unselfish. But the doctor, who was not English, thought him a barbarian."

== Adaptations ==
=== Television ===
==== British live-action adaptation ====
The novel was adapted as an episode for the series Agatha Christie's Poirot, in 1992. It starred David Suchet as Hercule Poirot, and Philip Jackson as Chief Inspector James Japp. Although the adaptation remained largely faithful to most of the novel's plot, it featured a number of changes:

- The characters of Dr Bryant, James Ryder and Armand Dupont are omitted from the adaptation; Jean Dupont is the only archaeologist on the flight.
- The aircraft is a Douglas DC-3, instead of a Handley Page H.P.42 as described in the novel. The DC3 is slightly anachronistic, as the type first flew in December 1935: the episode is set in June 1935 (Poirot watches Fred Perry winning the French Championships). All H.P.42s had been destroyed by 1940, and the still-flying DC3 used in the production, registration G-AMRA, was built in 1944.
- Poirot is assisted by Japp throughout the investigation; he comes with him to investigate the case in France. Inspector Fournier is given a lesser role as a result.
- The details of some of the characters are modified:
  - Jane Grey is an air stewardess on the flight. Although she works with Poirot on the case, she is not matched up with anyone at its conclusion.
  - Daniel Clancy suffers from a mental malady, in which he believe his fictional detective has a control on his life. He attends the denouement mainly to learn who the killer is, rather than witnessing a real-life detective at work.
  - Venetia Kerr and Poirot do not change seats on the flight.
  - Anne Morisot (a.k.a. Madeleine) has married Gale in Paris, not Rotterdam.
  - Armand Dupont is dead for two years.
- Poirot meets some of the suspects at a tennis match he attends in Paris, by invitation of Jane.

==== Japanese animated adaptation ====
It was later adapted as the final 4 episodes of the Japanese animated television series Agatha Christie's Great Detectives Poirot and Marple, airing in 2005.

=== Radio ===
The novel was adapted for radio by BBC Radio 4 in 2003, featuring John Moffatt as Poirot, Philip Jackson as Chief Inspector Japp (as in the Agatha Christie's Poirot adaptation), Geoffrey Whitehead as Monsieur Fournier, and Teresa Gallagher as Jane Grey.

== In popular culture ==
- The novel is referenced in the Doctor Who episode "The Unicorn and the Wasp" (2008), which features the Doctor and Donna meeting Agatha Christie in the year 1926, and investigating a series of murders alongside her that were inspired by her novels to that date, committed by a giant, alien wasp. The Doctor remarks towards the end of the episode that, although Christie's memories of the events were erased after the wasp's death, she recalled them in such a way that they later inspired her to write Death in the Clouds, with the inclusion of a wasp in its plot. The book cover shown in the episode is that of the 1974 Fontana Books edition.

== Publication history ==
Dustjacket illustration of the UK first edition

- Death in the Air (hardcover), New York: Dodd Mead and Company, 10 March 1935, 304 pp.
- Death in the Clouds (hardcover), London: Collins Crime Club, July 1935, 256 pp.
- Death in the Air (paperback), Avon, New York: Avon Books, 1946, 259 pp.
- Death in the Clouds (paperback), Fontana Books, an imprint of HarperCollins, 1957, 188 pp.
- Death in the Air (paperback), New York: Popular Library, 1961, 189 pp.
- Death in the Clouds (paperback), Pan Books, 1964, 188 pp.
- Death in the Clouds (hardcover) (large-print ed.), Ulverscroft, 1967, 219 pp.
- Death in the Clouds (hardcover), Greenway edition of collected works, William Collins, 1973, ISBN 0-00-231187-9, 256 pp.
- "Death in the Air", Murder on Board (hardcover), Dodd, Mead & Co, 1974, ISBN 0-396-06992-4, along with The Mystery of the Blue Train and What Mrs. McGillicuddy Saw!, 601 pp.
- Death in the Air (hardcover), Greenway edition of collected works, Dodd Mead, 1974, 256 pp
- Death in the Clouds (hardback) (Poirot facsimile ed.), HarperCollins, 2 April 2007, ISBN 978-0-00-723442-4 (facsimile of 1935 UK first edition).

The book was first serialised in the US in The Saturday Evening Post in six instalments from 9 February (Volume 207, Number 32) to 16 March 1935 (Volume 207, Number 37) under the title Death in the Air with illustrations by Frederick Mizen.

In the UK, the novel was serialised as an abridged version in the weekly Women's Pictorial magazine in six instalments from 16 February (Volume 29, Number 736) to 23 March 1935 (Volume 29, Number 741) under the title Mystery in the Air. There were no chapter divisions and all of the instalments carried illustrations by Clive Uptton.
