= Mrs McGinty's Dead =

1952 mystery novel by Agatha Christie

- Dust-jacket illustration of the US (true first) edition, with "Mrs." not "Mrs"; see Publication history (below) for UK first edition jacket image.
- Author: Agatha Christie
- Cover artist: Not known
- Language: English
- Series: Hercule Poirot
- Genre: Crime
- Publisher: Dodd, Mead and Company
- Publication date: February 1952
- Publication place: United Kingdom; United States
- Media type: Print (hardback & paperback)
- Pages: 243 (first edition, hardback)
- Preceded by: The Under Dog and Other Stories (short stories)
- Followed by: After the Funeral

Mrs McGinty's Dead is a mystery novel by English writer Agatha Christie, first published in the US by Dodd, Mead and Company in February 1952 and in the UK by the Collins Crime Club on 3 March the same year. The US edition retailed at $2.50 and the UK edition at nine shillings and sixpence (9/6). The Detective Book Club issued an edition, also in 1952, as Blood Will Tell.

The novel features the characters Hercule Poirot and Ariadne Oliver. The story is a "village mystery", a subgenre of whodunit which Christie usually reserved for Miss Marple. The novel is notable for its wit and comic detail, something that had been little in evidence in the Poirot novels of the 1930s and 1940s. Poirot's misery in the run-down guesthouse, Mrs Oliver's observations on the life of a detective novelist and her growing frustration at artistic liberties taken during adaptions of her characters into plays, provide considerable entertainment in the early part of the novel. The publication of Mrs McGinty's Dead may be considered as marking the start of Poirot's final phase, in which Ariadne Oliver plays a large part. Although she had appeared in Cards on the Table in 1936, Mrs Oliver's most significant appearances in Christie's work begin here. She appears in five of the last nine Christie novels featuring Poirot, and appears on her own without Poirot at all in The Pale Horse (1961).

== Plot summary ==
Superintendent Spence visits Poirot to ask him to find evidence that would forestall the execution of James Bentley, recently convicted of killing his elderly landlady, Mrs McGinty, for a meagre £30. All evidence points to his guilt, but something about Bentley's dreary acceptance of his fate just doesn't sit right with the experienced Spence. Poirot agrees to go to the village of Broadhinny and investigate the murder. Taking a room in the Summerhayes' guest house, Poirot finds that Mrs McGinty often worked as a charwoman at various village houses. He also discovers that most of the townsfolk believe that Bentley is guilty.

During the course of his investigations, Poirot discovers that, three days before the murder, Mrs McGinty took a clipping from a notorious Sunday newspaper. The clipping showed photos of four females who had disappeared after having been involved in decades-old criminal cases. Mrs McGinty wrote to the paper, claiming to have found a similar photo, proving one of her neighbours was really one of the women in the article. However, her terrible spelling had caused the paper to dismiss her as a simple fame-seeker.

Poirot and Spence, going by the ages of the people in the town, conclude that someone is either Lily Gamboll, who committed murder with a meat cleaver at 12 years of age, or Eva Kane, a governess who'd had an affair with her employer, Arthur Craig. Craig was later convicted and executed for killing his wife, though the police believed it was actually Eva's doing. After being acquitted as an accessory, a pregnant Eva had changed her surname to "Hope" and left the country. Some sources claim she had a child named Evelyn, and several women in the town are the right age to be Evelyn, as well.

Shortly afterwards, Poirot discovers an old sugar cutter with traces of blood on it in the Summerhayes' house; the house is untidy and never locked, and the hammer was accessible to anyone. In an attempt to flush out the murderer, Poirot claims to know more than he does; later, someone tries to push him under an oncoming train, proving that a guilty party is still at large. Having acquired originals of the photos used in the article, Poirot shows them to the villagers at a gathering at elderly, wealthy Mrs Laura Upward's house. Mrs Upward claims to have seen the photo of Lily Gamboll, but refuses to say where.

Later, Poirot is contacted by Maude Williams, who had worked at an estate agent's with Bentley in another town before Bentley was laid off. She refuses to believe he is capable of murder, and offers to help Poirot. He accepts, and gets her to pose as a maid in the house of Mrs Wetherby, one of the houses Mrs McGinty cleaned. Poirot has already noticed that Mrs Wetherby's daughter by her first marriage, Deirdre Henderson, also believes in Bentley's innocence.

During the maid's night off, Mrs Upward's spoiled son, playwright Robin Upward, goes to the theatre with famed mystery writer Ariadne Oliver, whose novel he is planning to dramatize. When they return home, they find Mrs Upward strangled to death. She has evidently had coffee with her murderer; there is lipstick on a cup and perfume in the air, which point to a woman having committed the crime. Mrs Upward had invited three people to her house that night: Eve Carpenter, Deirdre Henderson, and Shelagh Rendell. Only Henderson came, but she found the house dark, and left. Any of the three women could be someone from the photographs. Additionally, the postmistress's assistant, Edna, saw someone with blonde hair enter the house; Carpenter and Rendell are blonde, but Henderson is brunette.

A book is discovered in the Upward house with Evelyn Hope's signature written on the flyleaf, suggesting that Mrs Upward was actually Eva Kane, further confusing the situation. Poirot then finds a photo in a drawer at the Summerhayes' house, and realizes it must be the photo Mrs McGinty saw. It is of Eva Kane, with the inscription "my mother" on the back. Recognizing the handwriting, Poirot gathers the suspects together and accuses Robin Upward of the murders, startling him into a confession.

Robin Upward is Eva Kane's son, Evelyn Hope; the real Robin Upward died young while his family had been living abroad. Too proud to be pitied as a childless widow, Mrs Upward began taking in promising young men as replacement "sons", dropping them if they proved unsatisfactory. Evelyn Hope had been the most successful of these protégés – he legally changed his name to Robin Upward and moved to Broadhinny with Mrs Upward, where no one knew him. Mrs McGinty, however, found the photo of Eva Kane in the house while cleaning it, and blackmailed Evelyn with it, believing it was a photo of Mrs Upward as a young woman.

Evelyn, knowing that being revealed as a murderer's son would put an end to his use of Mrs Upward's money, stole the sugar cutter and killed Mrs McGinty. He then framed Bentley by stealing £30, correctly assuming Bentley would panic and incriminate himself. When Mrs Upward saw the four photos at the party, she had recognized Eva Kane, but pointed to Lily Gamboll to throw Poirot off the scent, wishing to confront Evelyn in her own time.

Evelyn suspected the truth; pretending to forget something on the night of his play, he left Mrs Oliver waiting in the car, went back inside and strangled Mrs Upward. He planted the evidence of a female visitor, then, pretending to be his mother, he called Miss Henderson, Mrs Carpenter and Mrs Rendell in turn, hoping one of the women would come over and inadvertently incriminate herself. When this failed, he planted the photo in a drawer at Mrs Summerhayes' house, hoping to incriminate her. Unfortunately, Poirot had recently tidied up the same drawer, which proved the photo had not been there before Evelyn came to the house.

Further revelations are also made: Eve Carpenter wanted to conceal her past from her aristocratic husband, which was why she would not co-operate in the investigation. Spence discovers that Shelagh Rendell has been receiving poison pen letters claiming that her husband murdered his first wife; Poirot suspects that it was Dr Rendell who tried to kill him at the train station. Maude Williams turns out to be the Craigs' legitimate child; like the police, she believed Eva was the one who really killed her mother, and that her father chivalrously took the blame. Maude was also aware of Evelyn Hope's true identity, and went to Mrs Upward's house to confront her, believing her to be an aged Eva Kane. When Maude found Mrs Upward's body, she feared she might be accused of the murder and fled. Poirot agrees to keep this a secret, and wishes her good luck in her life. Deirdre Henderson has inheritance money of her own, which is why her malingering mother and her stepfather have been jealously mistreating her. She and Bentley also have romantic feelings for each other. Bentley is freed, and Spence is convinced they have closed the case at last, much to Poirot's relief.

== Characters ==
- Hercule Poirot - Famous Belgian detective.
- Ariadne Oliver - Mystery novelist and old acquaintance of Poirot.
- Superintendent Spence - An old friend of Poirot's, due to soon retire from the police force.
- James Gordon Bentley - Apathetic former lodger of Mrs McGinty.
- Mr Scuttle - James Bentley's former employer.
- Maude Craig (alias Williams) - A former co-worker of James Bentley.
- Maureen Summerhayes - An adopted orphan who is now the inept owner of the Broadhinny guest house Long Meadows.
- Major Johnnie Summerhayes - Maureen's husband. He feels obliged to stay in Broadhinny because of his family history even though he does not know how to run the family estate.
- Guy Carpenter - A wealthy businessman who is running for Member of Parliament for his district.
- Eve Carpenter - The new wife of Guy Carpenter, formerly an employer of Mrs McGinty as Mrs Selkirk.
- Robin Upward - Playwright working with Oliver to dramatize one of her novels.
- Laura Upward - Wheelchair-using wealthy adoptive mother of Robin Upward.
- Dr Rendell - Local doctor of Broadhinny, whose friendliness seems a bit forced/not genuine.
- Shelagh Rendell - Nervous second wife of Dr Rendell, who believes Poirot is really in Broadhinny to investigate her husband.
- Mr Roger Wetherby - Overbearing stepfather of Deirdre Henderson who relies on her to keep house while taking advantage of her inheritance.
- Mrs Edith Wetherby - Mother of Deirdre Henderson. She exaggerates her infirmity to force Deirdre to stay and look after her.
- Deirdre Henderson - Edith's daughter and Roger's unhappy stepdaughter.
- Bessie Burch - Mrs McGinty's niece.
- Joe Burch - Bessie's rather unfriendly husband.
- Mrs McGinty - Charwoman for the Rendells, the Upwards, the Selkirks, the Wetherbys and the Carpenters; not particularly literate but had a good deal of worldly common sense and a taste for sensation and gossip.
- Mrs Sweetiman - The postmistress of Broadhinny, who also has a taste for sensation and gossip.
- Edna - Mrs Sweetiman's rather rabbit-like, unprepossessing assistant, who is having an affair with a married man.
- Pamela Horsefall - The rather cynical and masculine authoress of the article in the Sunday Comet; was written to by Mrs McGinty regarding the photographs.
- Michael West - Actor and old friend of Robin Upward, who knows some secrets about Upward's past.
- Mrs Elliott - Next door neighbour of Mrs McGinty, who discovered her body.
- Constable Albert "Bert" Hayling - Village constable of Broadhinny.
- Eva Kane - Former governess to the Craig family; seduced Mr Craig and was suspected of murdering Mrs Craig. Said to have gone to Australia.
- Lily Gamboll - Orphan who killed her aunt when she was twelve years old; sent to an approved school, moving to Ireland after being released.
- Janice Cortland - Woman who fled the country after her unpleasant husband was accidentally killed by her young lover in a brawl.
- Vera Blake - Woman with a propensity for marrying secret criminals and con-artists, whose children also grew up to be petty thieves and cons. Disappeared abroad and not seen since.

== Explanation of the title ==
The novel is named after a children's game – a sort of follow-the-leader type of verse somewhat like the Hokey-Cokey – that is explained in the course of the novel.

== Literary significance and reception ==
Maurice Richardson in The Observer of 23 March 1952 thought that Poirot was "slightly subdued" and summed up "Not one of A.C's best-constructed jobs, yet far more readable than most other people's."

Robert Barnard: "This village murder begins among the rural proletariat (cf. Death by Drowning in The Thirteen Problems and the excellent London working-class woman in The Hollow), but after a time it moves toward the better-spoken classes. Poirot suffers in a vividly awful country guesthouse in order to get in with the community and rescue a rather unsatisfactory young man from the gallows. Highly ingenious – at this point she is still able to vary the tricks she plays, not repeat them."

== References to other works ==
- When Superintendent Spence arrives to see Poirot, the detective reacts to him as though it has been many years since their last case together, Taken at the Flood, the previous novel, set in 1946, six years previously. Chronologies are difficult to construct, especially with Poirot's career.
- Poirot refers in the first chapter to a case in which the resemblance between his client and a soap manufacturer proved significant, "The Nemean Lion", first published in the Strand Magazine in November 1939 and later collected in The Labours of Hercules (1947).
- Mrs Oliver, who is a very amiable caricature of Agatha Christie herself, refers to gaffes in her books. In chapter 12, she mentions one of her novels, (Death in the Clouds) in which she had made a blowpipe one foot long, instead of six.
- "Evelyn Hope” is the name of a poem by Robert Browning that is quoted in the course of the novel. In Taken at the Flood Christie had made a character take the alias of "Enoch Arden", a poem by Alfred, Lord Tennyson.

== Adaptations ==
=== Film ===
The novel was adapted by MGM in 1964 as the film Murder Most Foul. However, in an unusual move, the character of Poirot was replaced with Miss Marple (portrayed by Margaret Rutherford), who comes onto the case as a juror in the trial of the lodger who is accused of the murder. She is the only juror to believe the lodger innocent, hanging the jury. The judge rules a mistrial and arranges for a retrial in a week, giving Miss Marple seven days to solve the case.

The film is only loosely based on the novel, altering almost all the characters, subplots, names, and deaths. The motive for the murder remains the same, but the killer's name and role are changed. The film's tone is more playful and light-hearted than the novel, as was characteristic of Rutherford's Christie film adaptations.

=== Television ===
==== British adaptation ====
A television programme was produced in 2007 with David Suchet as Poirot in the ITV series Agatha Christie's Poirot, first broadcast on 14 September 2008. It was directed by Ashley Pearce, who also directed Appointment with Death and Three Act Tragedy for the ITV series. It also starred Zoë Wanamaker returning as Ariadne Oliver (who first appeared in Cards on the Table) and Richard Hope as Superintendent Spence (who first appeared in Taken at the Flood), respectively. The adaptation is reasonably faithful to the novel, with the deletion of a few characters and omitting two of the women from the newspaper article – only focusing on Lily Gamboll and Eva Kane.

The characters of Deirdre Henderson and Maude Williams are merged in the film. Thus it is Maude Williams, the estate agents' secretary (with dark hair instead of blonde), who is in love with Bentley and helps Poirot throughout his investigation. Maude and Bentley are reunited by Poirot in the final scene. Also, Dr Rendall's secret is not that he is suspected of killing his first wife, but of mercy killing terminally ill patients. It is Mrs Rendall, rather than her husband, who makes an attempt on Poirot's life.

==== French adaptation ====
The novel was adapted as a 2015 episode of the French television series Les Petits Meurtres d'Agatha Christie.

=== Radio ===
Mrs McGinty's Dead was adapted for radio by Michael Bakewell for BBC Radio 4 in 2006, featuring John Moffatt as Poirot.

== Publication history ==
Dustjacket illustration of the UK First Edition (Book was first published in the US)

- 1952, Dodd Mead and Company (New York), February 1952, Hardback, 243 pp
- 1952, Collins Crime Club (London), 3 March 1952, Hardback, 192 pp
- 1952, Walter J. Black (Detective Book Club), 180 pp (Dated 1951)
- 1953, Pocket Books (New York), Paperback, 181 pp
- 1957, Fontana Books (Imprint of HarperCollins), Paperback, 188 pp
- 1970, Pan Books, Paperback, 191 pp
- 1988, Ulverscroft Large-print Edition, Hardcover, ISBN 0-7089-1771-2
- 2008, HarperCollins; Facsimile edition, Hardcover, ISBN 978-0-00-728053-7

In the US, the novel was serialised in the Chicago Tribune in its Sunday edition in thirteen parts from 7 October to 30 December 1951 under the title of Blood Will Tell.
