= Ariadne Oliver =

Character in the novels of Agatha Christie

- First appearance: Parker Pyne Investigates
- Last appearance: Elephants Can Remember
- Created by: Agatha Christie
- Portrayed by: Lally Bowers; Jean Stapleton; Zoë Wanamaker; Julia McKenzie; Stephanie Cole; Tina Fey

In-universe information
- Gender: Female
- Occupation: Crime/detective fiction writer
- Family: Alice (aunt); Celia Ravenscroft (goddaughter)

Ariadne Oliver is a fictional character in the novels of Agatha Christie. She (like Christie) is a crime fiction novelist, the creator of the fictional Finnish detective Sven Hjerson, and a friend of Hercule Poirot.

== Profile ==
Mrs Oliver often assists Poirot in his cases through her knowledge of the criminal mind. She often claims to be endowed with particular "feminine intuition", but it usually leads her astray. She is particularly fond of apples, which becomes a plot point in the novel Hallowe'en Party.

In the books, Oliver's most famous works are those featuring her Finnish detective Sven Hjerson. Since she knows nothing of Finland, Oliver frequently laments Hjerson's existence. In many of her appearances, Oliver – and her feelings toward Hjerson – reflect Agatha Christie's own frustrations as an author, particularly with the Belgian Hercule Poirot (an example of self-insertion). The self-caricature has also been used to discuss Christie's own follies in her earlier novels. For instance, in Mrs McGinty's Dead, Mrs Oliver talks of having made the blowpipe a foot long (30 cm) in one of her novels, whereas the actual length is something like four-and-a-half feet (1 1/2 yards (140 cm)) – the same mistake Christie made in Death in the Clouds.

In The Pale Horse, Mrs Oliver becomes acquainted with the Rev. and Mrs Dane Calthrop, who are friends of Miss Marple (The Moving Finger), thus establishing that Miss Marple and Hercule Poirot exist in the same world. In Cards on the Table, there is a reference to Mrs Oliver's book The Body in the Library; this title was used by Christie six years later, for a novel featuring Miss Marple. Books by Ariadne Oliver and by a number of other fictitious mystery writers are discussed by characters in The Clocks (1963). Like Christie, she is a member of the Detection Club. Christie even thought of setting a murder at the Club with Oliver being one of the suspects as well as the detective, but it came to nothing, although in Cards on the Table Mrs Oliver plays detective in a Poirot mystery involving a murder during a bridge game. A family crisis for Oliver's goddaughter Celia provides the plot in Elephants Can Remember.

Although Ariadne Oliver is consistently referred to as Mrs Oliver, nothing is known about her husband. An offhand reference to her marriage is made in Elephants Can Remember.

In a short piece in John Bull magazine in 1956, Christie was quoted as saying, "I never take my stories from real life, but the character of Ariadne Oliver does have a strong dash of myself." The author of the article went on to state, "It is perfectly true that sometimes she works at her stories in a large old-fashioned bath, eating apples and depositing the cores on the wide mahogany surround."

== Literary function ==
Ariadne Oliver does not function as a detective, even in the novel in which she appears without Poirot (The Pale Horse). In Cards on the Table, she does interview some of the suspects, which in turn allows her to discover a hidden motive that even the police were unable to find; in Elephants Can Remember she again interviews witnesses, but none of the essential ones. On the surface Christie appears to use Oliver mainly for comic relief or to provide a deus ex machina through her intuitive or sudden insights, as in Third Girl, in which she furnishes Poirot with virtually every important clue, or in The Pale Horse, where she inadvertently tips the investigators off about the type of poison used to kill the murder victims.

However beneath the surface of the stories Ariadne Oliver is in fact Christie's tool for getting hints and clues to the reader. In Dead Man's Folly Oliver creates a murder hunt and specifically tells Poirot that she has hidden six clues to the solution in the game. In fact Christie inserts six clues for savvy readers throughout the novel. In The Pale Horse Oliver states that she writes only about very "plain" murders, not anything supernatural - "'just about people who want other people out of the way and try to be clever about it'." Of course the solution to the murders is exactly that and not supernatural at all.

Further functions of Ariadne Oliver are to enable Christie to discuss overtly the techniques of detective fiction, to contrast the more fanciful apparatus employed by mystery authors with the apparent realism of her own plots, and to satirize Christie's own experiences and instincts as a writer. Interestingly Oliver also periodically functions as a kind of publicist for Christie. For example Ariadne Oliver discusses her book Body in the Library in Cards on the Table, published in 1936. Christie did not publish her version of The Body in the Library until 1942.

== Literary appearances ==
The true first appearance of Mrs Oliver was a brief appearance in the short story The Case of the Discontented Soldier, first published, along with four other stories, in the August 1932 issue of the U.S. version of Cosmopolitan magazine (issue number 554) under the sub-heading of Are You Happy? If Not Consult Mr. Parker Pyne. The story first appeared in the UK in issue 614 of Woman's Pictorial on 15 October 1932 and was published in book form in 1934 as Parker Pyne Investigates (titled Mr. Parker Pyne, Detective in the USA). Within this story she appeared as part of Pyne's unorthodox team of freelance assistants. In the same book she also briefly appears in The Case of the Rich Woman.

All her subsequent appearances (save The Pale Horse) were in Poirot novels:

- Cards on the Table (1936)
- Mrs McGinty's Dead (1952)
- Dead Man's Folly (1956)
- The Pale Horse (1961) – Oliver's only appearance in a Christie novel without Poirot
- Third Girl (1966)
- Hallowe'en Party (1969)
- Elephants Can Remember (1972)
- Hercule Poirot and the Greenshore Folly (2014) – a novella that was later expanded and published as Dead Man's Folly.

An advert for Ariadne Oliver's With Vinegar and Brown Paper (as with Agatha Christie using nursery rhyme references) appears in the Frontispiece of Mark Gatiss's book The Devil in Amber along with other adverts for made-up books.

In And Then There Were None the character Emily Brent mistakes the name Mrs Owen for Mrs Oliver, perhaps an in-joke that Emily Brent and Ariadne Oliver may have encountered each other at one point.

== Portrayals ==
=== Ariadne Oliver ===
The first television appearance of Oliver was an episode of The Agatha Christie Hour (1982). In an adaptation of the Parker Pyne story The Case of the Discontented Soldier she was portrayed by Lally Bowers.

A 1986 television film adaptation of Dead Man's Folly starred Jean Stapleton as Ariadne Oliver opposite Peter Ustinov as Poirot. This iteration of Oliver is American.

Zoë Wanamaker played Oliver in six episodes of the series Agatha Christie's Poirot, starring David Suchet as Hercule Poirot. In the last shot episode of the series (but not the finale) Oliver is helpful to Poirot in an adaptation of Dead Man's Folly, filmed on the Christie estate.

In the BBC Radio 4 plays Oliver has been played by Stephanie Cole (The Pale Horse (1993), Hallowe'en Party (1993), and Cards on the Table (2002)), and by Julia McKenzie (Elephants Can Remember (2006), Mrs McGinty's Dead (2006), and Dead Man's Folly (2007)).

Tina Fey portrays Oliver in the 2023 film A Haunting in Venice, based on Hallowe'en Party, opposite Kenneth Branagh's Poirot. Here Oliver is an American looking for a new idea for her next book.

=== Sven Hjerson ===
In The Clocks, an episode of Agatha Christie's Poirot, Poirot sees a play by Ariadne Oliver that features Hjerson, who is played by Andrew Havill.

The Swedish-German television series Agatha Christie's Hjerson features the character of Sven Hjerson, Oliver's Finland Swedish detective. In the eight-part series, combining Christie's stories with Nordic noir, the characters speak Swedish, and it is set in the modern day, with partial filming in Åland. It is produced by TV4, ZDF, Agatha Christie Ltd and the Government of Åland, among others, and stars Swedish actor Johan Rheborg as Hjerson.

== Fictional bibliography ==
Books:

- Lady Don't Fall Backwards (mentioned in Third Girl)
- The Lotus Murder (mentioned in Cards on the Table)
- The Clue of the Candle Wax (mentioned in Cards on the Table)
- The Body in the Library (mentioned in Cards on the Table)
- The Death in the Drain Pipe (mentioned in Cards on the Table)
- The Affair of the Second Goldfish (mentioned in Cards on the Table and Mrs McGinty's Dead)
- The Cat It Was Who Died (mentioned in Mrs McGinty's Dead)
- Death of a Debutante (mentioned in Mrs McGinty's Dead)
- The Woman in the Wood (mentioned in and based on her experiences from Dead Man's Folly)
- The Dying Goldfish (mentioned in Hallowe'en Party)

Published articles:

- The Tendency of the Criminal (mentioned in Cards on the Table)
- Famous Crimes Passionnels (mentioned in Cards on the Table)
- Murder for Love vs. Murder for Gain (mentioned in Cards on the Table)
