= Syrup of figs =

Laxative for constipation

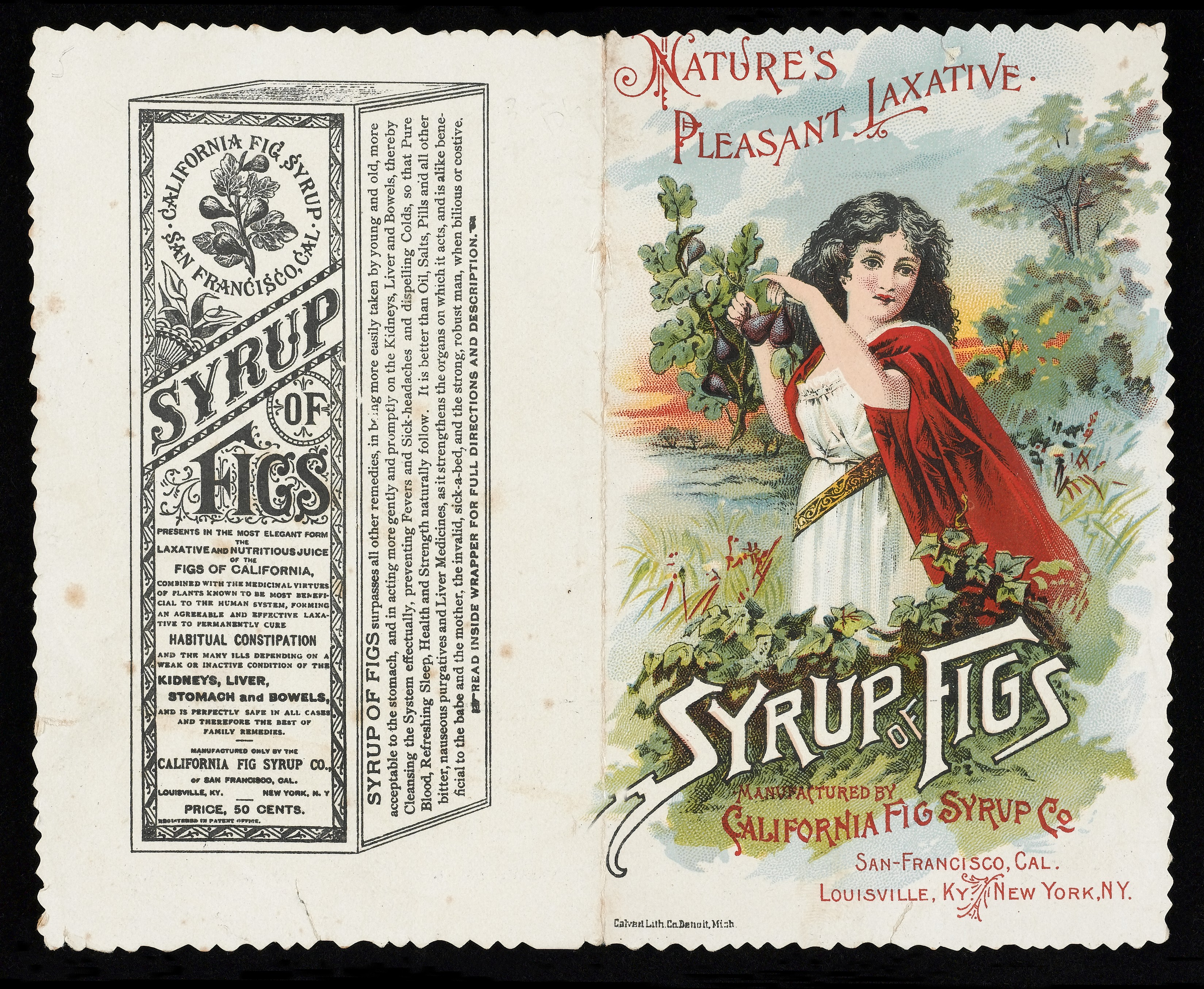
Syrup of Figs Commercial Preparation

Syrup of figs is a formerly proprietary laxative, now widely available commercially and also easy to make at home. It is made from figs and dried senna pods, both known for their laxative properties, as well as water, sugar and lemon flavoring. The syrup was invented in 1879 by Richard E. Queen and immediately sold to the California Fig Syrup Company of Reno, Nevada, which manufactured and marketed it thereafter.

The product was the subject of a lawsuit, Clinton Worden Company v. California Fig Syrup Company, which was decided against the syrup company by the Supreme Court of the United States in 1905.

== In popular culture ==
- In Cockney rhyming slang, a syrup of figs, sometimes shortened to syrup, means a wig.
- In episode 2, season 1 of the TV series Blandings (2013), syrup of figs is used for revenge.
- In Agatha Christie's 1936 novel Cards on the Table, a woman dies after a toxic paint is put in a syrup of figs bottle.
- In season 1, episode 7 of Downton Abbey, Daisy the scullery maid almost taints the servants' dinner of beef stew with syrup of figs, moving Thomas the footman to remark, "at least we'd all have been regular."
