= After the Funeral =

1953 mystery novel by Agatha Christie

- First edition dust-jacket illustration
- Author: Agatha Christie
- Series: Hercule Poirot
- Genre: Crime novel
- Publisher: Dodd, Mead and Company
- Publication date: March 1953
- Publication place: United States
- Media type: Print (hardback and paperback)
- Pages: 244 first edition, hardback
- Preceded by: Mrs McGinty's Dead
- Followed by: Hickory Dickory Dock

After the Funeral is a mystery novel by the English writer Agatha Christie, first published in the US by Dodd, Mead and Company in March 1953 under the title Funerals are Fatal and in UK by the Collins Crime Club on 18 May of the same year under Christie's original title. The US edition retailed at $2.50 and the UK edition at ten shillings and sixpence (10/6).

A 1963 UK paperback issued by Fontana Books changed the title to Murder at the Gallop to tie in with the film version. The book features the author's Belgian detective Hercule Poirot, but the Murder at the Gallop film adaptation instead featured her amateur sleuth, Miss Marple.

A wealthy man dies at home and his relatives gather after his funeral for the reading of the will, during which his sister states that he was murdered. The next day, she herself is found murdered and Poirot is called in to solve the mystery.

== Plot summary ==
Following the funeral of Richard Abernethie, his family assembles at Enderby Hall for the reading of the will by his lawyer, Mr Entwhistle. His wealth is to be divided between his surviving family: his brother Timothy Abernethie and his wife Maud; his sister Cora Lansquenet; his nephew George Crossfield; his first niece Rosamund Shane, and her husband Michael; his second niece Susan Banks, and her husband Gregory; and Helen Abernethie, the wife of his late brother Leo.

Although Richard died of natural causes and his death was expected, Cora makes the seemingly chance but potently disruptive comment that he was murdered. The day after the funeral, she is found dead, having been violently murdered in her sleep. No motive is obvious in Inspector Morton's investigations; while Cora's life income reverts to the Abernethie estate, her property goes to Susan, while her companion Miss Gilchrist, receives a number of her paintings. However, doubts soon arise about Richard's death in the wake of her murder. Seeking help, Entwhistle contacts his friend, Hercule Poirot, to resolve the matter. Poirot contacts an old colleague, Mr Goby, to investigate the family.

Each family member had their own reason for wanting Richard's wealth and are suspects in his murder. On the day of the inquest, Susan visits Cora's home to clean up her possessions for auction. She learns from Miss Gilchrist that her aunt always painted from life and that she also collected paintings from local sales in the hopes of finding a valuable piece. The day after Cora's funeral, art critic Alexander Guthrie arrives to look through Cora's recent purchases as previously scheduled, but finds nothing of value. That evening, Miss Gilchrist is poisoned with a slice of arsenic-laced wedding cake sent in the post; she survives, having only eaten a small portion. Gathering to select items from Richard's estate before its sale, the family are joined by Poirot and Miss Gilchrist. During discussions, Helen comments about believing there was something odd on the day of the funeral, Gilchrist makes a remark about a malachite table in Enderby, while Susan recalls finding a recently-dated painting of a seaside pier, destroyed in the war, in Cora's possession, which she believed had been copied from a picture postcard and not painted from life, which was Cora's usual style.

Early the next morning, Helen telephones Entwhistle to inform him what she had realised was odd during Richard's funeral, but is struck savagely on the head before she can say more. Helen suffers a concussion and is taken away for her safety. As Inspector Morton prepares to ask each family member about their movements on the day of Cora's murder, Poirot startles everyone by revealing to them that her murderer was Miss Gilchrist. She had recognised a Vermeer amongst Cora's recent purchases that her employer had not, and knew it was her chance to rebuild her beloved tea shop that she lost in the war. Gilchrist loathed Cora; even more she detested being a dependant. She hid the Vermeer behind a scene of the pier she painted from a postcard, unaware it had been destroyed in the war. Afterwards, she put a sedative in Cora's tea so she would be asleep, while Miss Gilchrist posed as her at the funeral. None of the family had seen Cora for more than two decades, which made her deception easier. After leaving the false suggestion that Richard had been murdered, Miss Gilchrist killed Cora the following day so that the police would believe it was connected to Richard's death. To divert suspicion from herself, Miss Gilchrist also faked the attempt on her life; ironically, this only aroused Poirot's suspicions even more.

Miss Gilchrist had to copy Cora's characteristic tilt of her head, but failed to realise she did it to the wrong side, as she rehearsed in front of a mirror. Helen was attacked because she eventually realised this. Furthermore, Poirot knew Miss Gilchrist had posed as Cora because she made a reference to the malachite table, which could only have been seen within Enderby Hall on the day of Richard's funeral. The Vermeer was hidden by Miss Gilchrist so Guthrie did not find it during his scheduled visit. Her claim that Cora painted the pier scene from life was countered by Susan finding a pre-war postcard of the pier in the cottage, along with Entwhistle recollecting that he smelt oil when he visited Cora's home after her murder. Poirot then reveals that two nuns visited Cora's cottage on the day of the funeral and believed someone was inside. Michael Shane also agrees with Poirot that it was Gilchrist at the funeral, not Cora, as he vaguely recognised her when he met her, as herself.

Once accused, Miss Gilchrist breaks down into a flood of complaints about the hardships of her life but quietly goes with the police. During legal proceedings before her trial, she eventually becomes insane, obsessively planning one tea shop after another, though Poirot and Entwhistle have no doubt she was in full possession of her faculties during her crime.

== Characters ==
- Mr Entwhistle - the Abernethie family's solicitor, he is also an assistant in the case and one of the friends of Inspector Morton.
- Inspector Morton - the investigating officer for the Berkshire County's police investigation into Cora's murder.
- Hercule Poirot - the Belgian detective called in by Entwhistle to aid Morton and the family.
- Mrs Cora Lansquenet - the victim of the case; an amateur painter and the youngest sister of Richard Abernethie. One of the heirs to Richard's fortune, before her murder. She was an eccentric and weak-minded woman who claimed to be an expert on art, when really she knew little about it.
- Richard Abernethie - a wealthy widower, recently deceased and cremated before the start of the novel. Lost one brother in World War II and another brother and two sisters to other causes. His only surviving son Mortimer, died six months earlier.
- Timothy Abernethie - only surviving brother of Richard; a grumpy invalid and one of the heirs to his brother's fortune.
- Maude Abernethie - Timothy's wife, a strong, healthy woman who tends to her husband's needs.
- Susan Banks - Richard's first niece, daughter of his brother Gordon and one of the heirs to his fortune; she is a woman with a drive for business and Cora's heir.
- Gregory Banks - Susan's husband; a chemist, who inadvertently gave a non-lethal overdose to one of his customers in the past.
- George Crossfield - Richard's nephew, son of his sister Laura; a solicitor for a stock broker's office and one of the heirs to Richard's fortune.
- Rosamund Shane - Richard's beautiful second niece, daughter of his sister Geraldine; she is an aspiring actress and another heir to Richard's fortune.
- Michael Shane - Rosamund's husband; like her, he is an aspiring actor.
- Helen Abernethie - widow of Richard's brother Leo and one of the heirs to Richard's fortune.
- Miss Gilchrist - Cora's paid companion and the murderer of the story; she owned a tea shop until it was lost in the war.
- Lanscombe - butler at Enderby Hall.
- Janet - kitchenmaid at Enderby Hall.
- Marjorie - cook at Enderby Hall.
- Mrs Jacks - Enderby Hall's cleaning lady.
- Mrs Jones - Timothy and Maude Abernethie's cleaning lady.
- Alexander Guthrie - an old friend of Cora Lansquenet and an expert on artwork.
- Miss Entwhistle - spinster sister of Mr Entwhistle.

== Themes ==
Unlike in Taken at the Flood, in which there is a strong sense of post-war English society re-forming along the lines of the "status quo ante", After the Funeral is deeply pessimistic about the social impact of war. A pier on a postcard has been bombed and not yet rebuilt, which fact is pivotal to the plot. Richard Abernethie is devastated that his only son died abruptly from polio, an epidemic of that time. The son was fit, healthy, about to marry, and then gone. Richard sees no other single heir worthy of succeeding to his estate entire. The Abernethie drive and talent for business are found in his niece Susan, but he cannot consider her as sole heir because she is female. Rather, he reacts to her by being disappointed in her husband. Not finding any one person to take over his fortune and business, he divides the money among family members who seem likely to waste it on gambling and theatrical ventures.

One person he valued was his sister-in-law, now widowed by the war. She had a child in a war time affair, but never told Richard, aware of his Victorian views, telling others he is her nephew. She is grateful for his kindness in including her in his will, as she can now raise her son on faraway Cyprus with a proper education. The child is loved, but his mother feels he cannot be accepted in post-war England. The last name chosen for Cora's husband, the much disliked painter with some claim to being French, is Lansquenet. It is unusual as a last name, as mentioned in the story. The word is the name of a card game and is the term for the German mercenary foot soldier with a lance or lancer of the 15th and 16th centuries, who may have played that card game.

Food rationing in England came to an end in the year of publication, but its effect is still felt in the egg shortages that are mentioned in the novel. Throughout, there is a strong sense of the hardships of the post-war period, including the conniving Miss Gilchrist's heartache at losing her cherished teashop due to food shortages and being forced into a life of dependence, in which she is regarded as little more than a servant. There are also comments on the increased burden of taxation associated with Clement Attlee's government.

== Literary significance and reception ==
Robert Barnard said of this novel that it had "A subject of perennial appeal – unhappy families: lots of scattered siblings, lots of Victorian money (made from corn plasters). Be sure you are investigating the right murder, and watch for mirrors (always interesting in Christie). Contains Christie's last major butler: the 'fifties and 'sixties were not good times for butlers."

== Adaptations ==
=== Film ===
In 1963, a film adaptation entitled Murder at the Gallop was released by MGM. It was the second of George Pollock’s four popular Christie adaptations. This version replaced Poirot with the character of Miss Marple, played by Margaret Rutherford. The film makes a number of other changes to the novel:

- A change in setting: the majority of the film's action is set in a riding establishment
- The addition of film character 'Mr Stringer' (played by Stringer Davis, Margaret Rutherford's real-life husband)
- The addition of a third death
- The alteration and omission of a number of characters
- A much lighter-hearted, more playful tone

=== Television ===
On 26 March 2006, an adaptation of the novel was broadcast on ITV with David Suchet as Poirot in the tenth series of Agatha Christie's Poirot. The cast included Michael Fassbender as George, Geraldine James as Helen Abernethie, Lucy Punch as Susan, Robert Bathurst as Gilbert Entwhistle, Anna Calder-Marshall as Maude, Fiona Glascott as Rosamund and Monica Dolan as Miss Gilchrist.

There were some changes made for the adaptation:

- Cora is the divorced wife of an Italian artist named Gallaccio, whose surname she kept (interestingly, the producer of many episodes of the BBC's Miss Marple series was George Gallaccio). Gallaccio replaces the character of Mr Guthrie as the art expert that Poirot relies upon.
- Miss Gilchrist's teashop in the novel was named the Palm Tree, but this version renamed it the Willow Tree (all the china was willow pattern). In the book, this is the name of the tea shop she kept before the war.
- The painting revealed at the end is a Rembrandt instead of a Vermeer.
- Entwhistle does not investigate following the funeral and will-reading, but only after Cora's death, though in a minor capacity.
- The character of Mr Goby is omitted. Poirot appears solely under his own name and interviews the family members himself.
- Timothy's ability to walk is only shown at the end, unlike in the book where it is known from the start; while Maude is presented as slightly foolish and participates in a flirtation with Gallaccio.
- Susan Banks is renamed Susannah Henderson; she is unmarried and devoted to missionary work in Africa (specifically, Bechuanaland).
- George is Helen's son, Richard's favoured nephew and expected heir to the bulk of the estate. He is carrying on a secret romance with Susan/Susannah; on the day after the funeral they had a secret tryst in Lytchett St Mary. Also, Richard was George's real father: Richard had told him this, but George refused to accept it and quarrelled violently with him (which Poirot and Entwhistle learn from Lanscombe) and in his disgust forged a will disinheriting himself in favour of the other relatives.
- As in several other episodes, the time has been changed to the 1930s – in this case, from the post-World War II years.
- The pier in the painting found by Susan/Susannah was destroyed by a fire, not the war.
- Miss Gilchrist lost her tea-shop due to a Lyons tea-house opening nearby, not due to wartime rationing.
- When Miss Gilchrist is arrested and taken away, she pauses to repeat her imitation of Cora. Poirot suggests she could be committed for insanity, but there is no further discussion.
- Susan/Susannah and Rosamund are sisters instead of cousins, both of them being the daughters of Richard's sister Geraldine.
- In the book, Rosamund's secret alibi is seeing a doctor to confirm that she was pregnant. In the episode, Rosamund knew she was pregnant and was going to get an abortion, but changed her mind after arriving.

In this production, common to the ITV-produced Poirot adaptations, as well as fleshing out the plot and relationships there are character developments inserted which are atypical to Christie's writing:

- Cousins have an illicit encounter.
- A wife with an unfaithful husband, goes for abortion but decides against it.
- A woman and her brother-in-law have an affair and conceal the parentage of their child.

=== Radio ===
Michael Bakewell adapted After the Funeral for BBC Radio 4, featuring John Moffatt as Poirot with Frank Thornton as Mr. Entwistle, broadcast on 29 August 1999.

== Publication history ==
Dustjacket illustration of the UK First Edition (Book was first published in the US)

- 1953, Dodd Mead and Company (New York), March 1953, Hardback, 243 pp
- 1953, Collins Crime Club (London), 18 May 1953, Hardback, 192 pp
- 1954, Pocket Books (New York), Paperback, 224 pp
- 1956, Fontana Books (Imprint of HarperCollins), Paperback, 191 pp
- 1968, Ulverscroft Large-print Edition, Hardcover, 237 pp
- 1978, Ulverscroft Large-print Edition, Hardcover, 422 pp ISBN 0-7089-0186-7

The novel was first serialised in the US in the Chicago Tribune in forty-seven parts from Tuesday, 20 January to Saturday, 14 March 1953. In the UK the novel was first serialised in the weekly magazine John Bull in seven abridged instalments from 21 March (Volume 93, Number 2438) to 2 May 1953 (Volume 93, Number 2444) with illustrations by William Little.
