= Dead Man's Folly =

1956 Poirot novel by Agatha Christie

- Dust-jacket illustration of the US (true first) edition. See Publication history (below) for UK first edition jacket image.
- Author: Agatha Christie
- Language: English
- Series: Hercule Poirot
- Genre: Crime novel
- Publisher: Dodd, Mead and Company
- Publication date: October 1956
- Publication place: United Kingdom
- Media type: Print (hardback & paperback)
- Pages: 216
- Preceded by: Hickory Dickory Dock
- Followed by: Cat Among the Pigeons

Dead Man's Folly is a mystery novel by the English writer Agatha Christie, first published in the US by Dodd, Mead and Company in October 1956 and in the UK by the Collins Crime Club on 5 November of the same year. The US edition retailed at $2.95 and the UK edition at twelve shillings and sixpence (12/6). It features Hercule Poirot and Ariadne Oliver.

== Plot summary ==
Poirot is invited to Nasse House in Devon by crime-mystery writer Ariadne Oliver, who is staging a Murder Hunt as part of a summer fête the next day. At Nasse House, Mrs Oliver explains that small aspects of her plans for the Murder Hunt have been changed by requests from people in the house rather deviously, until a real murder would not surprise her.

The wealthy Sir George Stubbs owns Nasse House. His much younger wife is the beautiful Hattie, Lady Stubbs. She shows interest in fine clothes and jewellery only, appearing simple to all but her husband's secretary, Miss Brewis, who sees through Hattie's outward appearance but is herself conflicted because of her own feelings for her employer, Sir George. Hattie and George were introduced by Amy Folliat, the last of the family who had owned the estate for centuries. Widowed, Mrs Folliat lost her two sons during the War. With the death duties very high in the post-war period, she had to sell the ancestral home and grounds to keep it intact. She took in the orphaned Hattie, introducing her to society and later to Sir George. Mrs Folliat rents the lodge on the estate. Michael Weyman, an architect, is on site to design a tennis court; he criticises the inappropriate location of a recently built folly. Sir George shouts at three young tourists who cross his private property; they are a Dutch woman, an Italian woman, and a man wearing a shirt decorated with turtles.

On the day of the fête, Hattie receives a letter from her cousin, Etienne de Sousa, who will visit that day; she appears very upset by his abrupt visit. A local Girl Guide, Marlene Tucker, waits in the boathouse to pose as the dead victim when a player finds the key to enter. Her first visitor is Miss Brewis with a tray of refreshments at tea time, at Hattie's request. With Mrs Oliver, Poirot discovers Marlene dead in the boathouse. Hattie cannot be found. Mrs Oliver produces an abundance of theories to explain the murder and the disappearance, while the police and Poirot narrow the field from all attending the fête, to those familiar with the Murder Hunt. The investigation focuses first on Etienne de Sousa and briefly on Amanda Brewis. Further confusion is added by the behaviour of the Legges, staying in a cottage on the estate and whose marriage is in trouble. After weeks of no progress, Poirot visits Devon again, learning that Hattie is still missing. Merdell, an old boatman who recently drowned, was Marlene's grandfather. Poirot puts together several stray clues: Marlene's grandfather had seen a woman's body in the woods; Marlene received small sums of money used to make small purchases, now in her younger sister's possession. Merdell had told Poirot mischievously that there would "always be Folliats at Nasse House".

In the dénouement, Poirot explains that Sir George Stubbs is really Amy Folliat's younger son, James, a war deserter. Mrs Folliat paired him with the wealthy but naive Hattie, hoping that the marriage would be beneficial to both. But James fleeced Hattie of her money to establish his new identity and to purchase the old family home. Unknown to Mrs Folliat, James had married a young Italian woman after deserting the war. He killed the original Hattie shortly after entering into the bigamous marriage, and his Italian wife played the role of Hattie thereafter. Marlene Tucker had learned the true identity of George Stubbs from her grandfather. Both were murdered separately, although the old man's death had been presumed accidental. The day before the fête, the fake Hattie posed as an Italian tourist staying in the nearby hostel. She switched between the two roles frequently over a 24-hour period. The fake Hattie also sent Miss Brewis to bring refreshments to Marlene shortly before the girl was murdered. Hattie then killed Marlene, changed to the tourist guise, and tossed the large hat she wore as Hattie in the river. She then left the area as the Italian tourist, carrying a rucksack. The date of Marlene's murder had been selected to cast suspicion upon Etienne, who had written weeks earlier of his visit, as he told Inspector Bland. Having grown up with the real Hattie, Etienne would not have been fooled.

Poirot privately reveals to Mrs. Folliat that he knows the truth. As the sounds of the police smashing up the folly to locate and exhume Hattie's body are heard, Mrs. Folliat asks Poirot to go away so she may face things alone, leaving the fate of herself and her son ambiguous.

== List of characters ==
- Hercule Poirot, the Belgian private detective
- Ariadne Oliver, the celebrated author
- Inspector Bland, the investigating officer
- Sergeant Frank Cottrell, a policeman in the case
- Sir George Stubbs, owner of Nasse House
- Hattie, Lady Stubbs, George's wife
- Etienne de Sousa, Lady Stubbs's cousin
- Amanda Brewis, George's secretary
- Amy Folliat, whose family previously owned Nasse House
- Mr Wilfred Masterton, member of Parliament
- Mrs Connie Masterton, his wife
- Captain Jim Warburton, political agent for Mr Masterton
- Michael Weyman, an architect
- Alec Legge, an atomic physicist
- Sally Legge, his wife
- Marlene Tucker, a Girl Guide
- Marilyn Tucker, Marlene's younger sister
- Mr and Mrs Tucker, Marlene and Marilyn's parents
- Merdell, the 92-year-old boatman, father of Mrs Tucker
- Henden, the butler
- A young Italian woman on holiday, a hiker with rucksack
- A young Dutch woman on holiday, a hiker with rucksack
- A young man in a shirt with turtles on it

== Literary significance and reception ==
Anthony Quinton began his review column in the Times Literary Supplement of 21 December 1956, writing, "Miss Agatha Christie's new Poirot story comes first in this review because of this author's reputation and not on its own merits, which are disappointingly slight. They consist almost wholly in the appearance yet once more of certain profoundly familiar persons, scenes and devices. Poirot is on hand with his superb English, based, one supposes, on the middle line in the French lessons in the Children's Encyclopaedia, but the little grey cells are rather subdued." He set up the basics of the plot and then continued, "The solution is of the colossal ingenuity we have been conditioned to expect but a number of the necessary red herrings are either unexplained or a little too grossly ad hoc. People are never candid about their vices so there is no need to take seriously the protestations of detective addicts about their concern with the sheer logic of their favourite reading. What should be the real appeal of Dead Man's Folly, however, is not much better than its logic. The scene is really excessively commonplace, there are too many characters and they are very, very flat."

The anonymous review in The Times of 15 November 1956, was also somewhat damning; "Dead Man's Folly is not Miss Agatha Christie at her best. The murder and the solution of it are ingenious, but then, with Miss Christie, they always are, and it is pleasant to watch M. Hercule Poirot at work again. The character drawing is flat and facile, however, and the dialogue, always Miss Christie's weak point, disastrous."

Maurice Richardson of The Observer (18 November 1956) pointed out the similarity between the house portrayed in the book and Christie's own (Greenway Estate) and summed up, "Stunning but not unguessable solution. Nowhere near a vintage Christie but quite a pleasing table-read."

Robert Barnard: "Highly traditional recipe, but not done with the same conviction as in the thirties. Nobody much is what they seem, and old sins cast long shadows. Mrs Oliver looms large here, as she was frequently to do from now on, both in Poirot books and in others."

== Adaptations ==
=== 1986 film ===
The novel was made into a film with Peter Ustinov and Jean Stapleton starring as Poirot and Oliver in a 1986 adaptation set in the present day. It was shot largely on location at West Wycombe Park in Buckinghamshire.

=== Radio ===
John Moffatt starred as Poirot in the BBC Radio 4 dramatisation broadcast in 2007, with Julia McKenzie as Ariadne Oliver. It was the final time he played the role.

=== Television ===
The novel was adapted with David Suchet as Poirot, as part of the series of Agatha Christie's Poirot. It guest-starred Sean Pertwee (Sir George Stubbs), Stephanie Leonidas (Hattie Stubbs), Sinéad Cusack (Amy Folliat), Rebecca Front (Amanda Brewis), Tom Ellis (D.I. Bland), Martin Jarvis (Captain Warburton), Rosalind Ayres (Mrs Warburton), Daniel Weyman (Alec Legge) and Zoë Wanamaker in her sixth and final appearance as Ariadne Oliver. This was the last episode of the series to be filmed (although not the last to air), with production completed in June 2013. The telefilm was shot mainly at Agatha Christie's home, Greenway Estate, the setting she used, along with its old boathouse on the River Dart, for the novel.

The adaptation is broadly faithful to the novel, but with some differences. The setting is moved from the early 1950s to the late 1930s; accordingly, James Folliat – a war deserter in the novel – is here a wayward womaniser whom Mrs Folliat sends to South Africa, where he fakes his death in an aviation accident and returns to Nasse in the identity of Sir George Stubbs. Mrs Masterton becomes Mrs Warburton, Captain Warburton's wife; Marlene's sister, Marilyn, becomes an older sister named Gertie, but serves the same function as Marilyn in the novel; the characters of George the valet, Miss Lemon, the man in the turtle-printed shirt, and Marlene's parents are deleted. The adaptation slightly changes the end of the story to reveal the fate of the Folliats, which was untold in the novel. As the police are digging up the folly foundations, Poirot lays out the truth to Mrs Folliat who then goes into the manor house and admonishes her son. Two offscreen gunshots are heard, and Poirot both acknowledges and approves of this murder-suicide with the final word of the episode: "Bon".

=== Computer game ===
On 15 October 2009, I-play released a downloadable hidden object game based on Dead Man's Folly (see the external links). This is the third game in a series of Oberon Games' hidden object games based on Agatha Christie's novels, the first two are based on Death on the Nile and Peril at End House. The 4th game in the series is based on 4:50 from Paddington.

== Publication history ==
Dustjacket illustration of the UK First Edition (book was first published in the US)

- 1956, Dodd Mead and Company (New York), October 1956, Hardback, 216 pp
- 1956, Collins Crime Club (London), 5 November 1956, Hardback, 256 pp
- 1957, Pocket Books (New York), Paperback, 178 pp
- 1960, Fontana Books (Imprint of HarperCollins), Paperback, 192 pp
- 1966, Pan Books, Paperback, 189 pp
- 1967, Ulverscroft Large-print Edition, Hardcover, 205 pp

The novel was first serialised in the US in Collier's Weekly in three abridged instalments from 20 July (Volume 138, Number 2) to 17 August 1956 (Volume 138, Number 4) with illustrations by Robert Fawcett.

In the UK the novel was first serialised in the weekly magazine John Bull in six abridged instalments from 11 August (Volume 100, Number 2615) to 15 September 1956 (Volume 100, Number 2620) with illustrations by "Fancett".
