= Cards on the Table =

1936 mystery novel by Agatha Christie

- Dust-jacket illustration of the first UK edition
- Author: Agatha Christie
- Language: English
- Series: Hercule Poirot
- Genre: Crime novel
- Publisher: Collins Crime Club
- Publication date: 2 November 1936
- Publication place: United Kingdom
- Media type: Print (hardback and paperback)
- Pages: 286
- Preceded by: Murder in Mesopotamia
- Followed by: Murder in the Mews (short stories)

Cards on the Table is a mystery novel by the English author Agatha Christie, first published in the UK by the Collins Crime Club on 2 November 1936 and in the US by Dodd, Mead and Company the following year. The UK edition retailed at seven shillings and sixpence (7/6) and the US edition at $2.00.

The book features the recurring characters of Hercule Poirot, Colonel Race and Superintendent Battle, with the crime writer Ariadne Oliver making her first appearance in a Poirot novel. The four detectives and four possible suspects play bridge after dinner with Mr Shaitana. At the end of the evening, Mr Shaitana is discovered murdered. Identifying the murderer, according to the author, depends wholly on discerning the psychology of the suspects.

The novel was well received, the critics noting its humour, the subtlety and tightness of the writing, and the good clueing. A later reviewer considered the book to stand at the very top rung of her novels, while another appreciated the brilliant surprise ending.

== Plot ==
Mr Shaitana, a flamboyant collector, meets Hercule Poirot by chance at an art exhibition and brags about his personal crime-related collection. Scoffing at the idea of collecting mere artefacts, Shaitana explains that he collects only the best exhibits: criminals who have evaded justice. He invites Poirot to a dinner party to meet them.

Poirot's fellow guests include three other crime professionals: secret serviceman Colonel Race, mystery writer Mrs Ariadne Oliver, and Superintendent Battle of Scotland Yard; along with four people Shaitana believes to be murderers: Dr Roberts, Mrs Lorrimer, Anne Meredith, and Major Despard. Shaitana taunts his suspects with comments that each understands as applying only to them.

The guests retire to play bridge, the professionals playing in one room while the others play in a second room where Shaitana relaxes by the fire. As the party breaks up, Shaitana is found to be dead – stabbed in the chest with a stiletto from his own collection. None of the suspects can be ruled out, as all had moved around during the evening. Leading the police investigation, Superintendent Battle agrees to put his "cards on the table" and to allow the other professionals to make their own enquiries. Poirot uses the bridge scores to deduce the playing style and personality of each suspect.

The investigators look into the suspects' histories. The husband of one of Dr Roberts' patients died of anthrax shortly after accusing the doctor of improper conduct. A botanist that Despard had been guiding through the Amazon was rumoured to have been shot. Anne's housemate Rhoda Dawes tells Mrs Oliver that an elderly woman for whom Anne was acting as companion died after mistaking hat paint for syrup of figs. Mrs Lorrimer's husband had died twenty years earlier, though little is known about that.

Mrs Lorrimer tells Poirot that she has just been diagnosed with a terminal illness, and that she wishes to confess to killing both her husband and Shaitana. Poirot refuses to believe her psychologically capable of spontaneous murder, and thinks that she is protecting Anne. Mrs Lorrimer reluctantly discloses that she had actually seen Anne commit the crime, but feels sympathy for a young girl just starting out in life. The next day, Despard, Roberts, and Anne all receive a suicide note and confession to the crime, supposedly written by Mrs Lorrimer. Battle informs Poirot by telephone that Dr Roberts rushed to the house only to find the woman had died of an overdose.

Poirot is again suspicious, as he knows that Anne had visited Mrs Lorrimer the previous night. He discovers that, due to the established time of death, Mrs Lorrimer could not possibly have sent the letters. Realising that Rhoda's life is in danger, since she knows about the syrup of figs incident, Poirot, Battle, and Despard race to Rhoda's cottage, arriving to find the two girls in a boat out on the river. Anne attempts to push Rhoda overboard, but Anne herself falls in and drowns, while Rhoda is rescued by Despard.

Poirot explains his findings. Despard had indeed shot and killed the botanist, but entirely by accident. Anne had poisoned her employer after switching the two bottles to conceal her petty thieving. Although Mrs Lorrimer thought she had seen Anne kill Shaitana, Anne had in fact just leaned forward to touch him and confirm he was already dead.

Poirot notes that only one suspect was psychologically capable of carrying out such a risky, unplanned stabbing – namely Dr Roberts. Fearing Shaitana had proof of the anthrax murder, Roberts quickly took his chance. He covered his tracks by forging Mrs Lorrimer's letters and killing her with an injection when he visited her house. Although Roberts initially protests, he is forced to confess when Poirot reveals a surprise eye-witness to the killing, a window-cleaner. After Roberts is led away, Rhoda notes what amazing luck it was that the window cleaner had been there at the exact moment of the fatal injection. Poirot replies that it had not been luck at all, and introduces them to a hired actor whose presence had prompted Roberts' confession.

With the murder solved, Despard courts Rhoda.

== Principal characters ==
- Mr Shaitana – Wealthy man with a fascination for murders and murderers. In Hindi, शैतान ('Shaitana') can refer to Satan or the devil. The first victim of the case
- Hercule Poirot – Belgian private detective. A guest at Shaitana's dinner party
- Ariadne Oliver – Crime fiction writer, and Poirot's friend. A guest at Shaitana's dinner party
- Superintendent Battle – Detective from Scotland Yard. A guest at Shaitana's dinner party
- Colonel Race – Secret Service agent. A guest at Shaitana's dinner party
- Dr Geoffrey Roberts – Physician. A guest at Shaitana's dinner party who may have killed one of his own patients
- Mrs Lorrimer – Widow and expert bridge player. A guest at Shaitana's dinner party who may have killed her husband. The second victim of the case
- Major John Despard – Explorer and hunter. A guest at Shaitana's dinner party who may have shot and killed someone while on an expedition
- Anne Meredith – A young woman, formerly a personal companion. A guest at Shaitana's dinner party who may have killed one of her employers. She dies from drowning during the case
- Rhoda Dawes – Anne's wealthy friend and flatmate
- Mrs Luxmore – A widow whose husband died in suspicious circumstances in South America.

== Foreword by the author ==
The novel contains a foreword by the author in which she explains that the novel has only four suspects and that since any of them, given the right circumstances, might have committed the crime, the deduction must be "entirely psychological". She notes that the book is no less interesting for that since "when all is said and done it is the mind of the murderer that is of supreme interest".

== Literary significance and reception ==
The Times Literary Supplement (14 November 1936) stated favourably in its review by Caldwell Harpur that, "Poirot scores again, scores in two senses, for this appears to be the authoress's twentieth novel. One of the minor characters in it is an authoress of thirty-two detective novels; she describes in several amusing pages the difficulties of her craft. Certainly Mrs Christie ought to know them, but she continues to surmount them so well that another score of novels may be hoped for."

In The New York Times Book Review (28 February 1937), Isaac Anderson concluded, "The story is ingenious, but there are one or two loose ends left dangling when his explanation is finished. Cards on the Table is not quite up to Agatha Christie's best work."

In The Observer's issue of 15 November 1936, in a review section entitled Supreme de Poirot, "Torquemada" (Edward Powys Mathers) wrote, "I was not the only one who thought that Poirot or his creator had gone a little off the rails in Murder in Mesopotamia, which means that others beside myself will rejoice at Mrs Christie's brilliant come-back in Cards on the Table. This author, unlike many who have achieved fame and success for qualities quite other than literary ones, has studied to improve in every branch of writing in each of her detective stories. The result is that, in her latest book, we note qualities of humour, composition and subtlety which we would have thought beyond the reach of the writer of The Mysterious Affair at Styles. Of course, the gift of bamboozlement, with which Agatha Christie was born, remains, and has never been seen to better advantage than in this close, diverting and largely analytical problem. Cards on the Table is perhaps the most perfect of the little grey cells."

The Scotsman (19 November 1936) wrote: "There was a time when M. Hercule Poirot thought of going into retirement in order to devote himself to the cultivation of marrows. Fortunately, the threat was never carried out; and in Mrs Christie's latest novel the little Belgian detective is in very good form indeed. The plot is simple but brilliant." The review concluded by saying, "Mrs Oliver, the novelist, is one of Mrs Christie's most amusing creations."

E.R. Punshon of The Guardian reviewed the novel in the 20 November 1936 issue when he began, "Even in a tale of crime and mystery humour is often of high value." He went on to say that, "In this respect... Agatha Christie shows herself once again... a model of detective tales. There are delightful passages when Poirot anxiously compares other moustaches with his own and awards his own the palm, when his lips are forced to utter the unaccustomed words 'I was in error', when Mrs Oliver, famous authoress, discourses upon art and craft of fiction. But all that never obscures the main theme as Poirot gradually unravels the puzzle of which four bridge-players had murdered their host." He concluded, "Largely by a careful study of the score, Poirot is able to reach the truth, and Mrs Christie sees to it that he does so by way of springing upon the reader one shattering surprise after another."

Robert Barnard said, "On the very top rung. Special opportunities for bridge enthusiasts, but others can play. Superb tight construction and excellent clueing. Will be read as long as hard-faced ladies gather for cards."

Charles Osborne said, "Cards on the Table is one of Agatha Christie's finest and most original pieces of crime fiction: even though the murderer is, as the author has promised, one of the four bridge players, the ending is positively brilliant and a complete surprise."

== Adaptations ==
=== Stage adaptation ===
The book was adapted as a stage play in 1981, although without Poirot. It opened at London's Vaudeville Theatre on 9 December 1981 with Gordon Jackson as Superintendent Battle and a cast that included Derek Waring, Belinda Carroll, Mary Tamm and Patricia Driscoll.

=== Television ===
- ITV adapted the story into a television programme in the series Agatha Christie's Poirot, starring David Suchet as Hercule Poirot and Zoë Wanamaker as Ariadne Oliver. The adaptation – with significant differences from the novel – was written by Nick Dear and aired in the US on A&E Network in December 2005 and in the UK on ITV1 in March 2006.
- The novel was also adapted as a 2014 episode of the French television series Les Petits Meurtres d'Agatha Christie.

=== Film ===
In 2016 a Bengali film Chorabali was released based on the storyline of the Cards on the Table. Barun Chanda played the role of Poirot.

=== Radio ===
Cards on the Table was adapted for radio by Michael Bakewell for BBC Radio 4, featuring John Moffatt as Hercule Poirot, Donald Sinden as Colonel Johnny Race, and Stephanie Cole as Ariadne Oliver.

== Publication history ==
- 1936, Collins Crime Club (London), 2 November 1936, Hardcover
- 1937, Dodd Mead and Company (New York), 1937, Hardcover
- 1949, Dell Books (New York), Paperback, (Dell number 293 [mapback])
- 1951, Pan Books, Paperback, (Pan number 176)
- 1957, Fontana Books (Imprint of HarperCollins), Paperback
- 1968, Greenway edition of collected works (William Collins), Hardcover
- 1968, Greenway edition of collected works (Dodd Mead), Hardcover
- 1969, Ulverscroft Large-print Edition, HardcoverISBN 0-85456-695-3
- 2007, Poirot Facsimile Edition (Facsimile of 1936 UK First Edition), HarperCollins, 5 March 2007, Hardback

The book was first serialised in the US in The Saturday Evening Post in six instalments from 2 May (Volume 208, Number 44) to 6 June 1936 (Volume 208, Number 49) with illustrations by Orison MacPherson.
