= Devils and Realist =

Japanese manga and anime series

- Cover of the first manga volume.

魔界王子 devils and realist (Makai Ōji)
- Genre: Adventure; Fantasy; Drama
- Manga
- Written by: Madoka Takadono
- Illustrated by: Utako Yukihiro
- Published by: Ichijinsha
- English publisher: NA: Seven Seas Entertainment
- Imprint: Zero Sum Comics
- Magazine: Monthly Comic Zero Sum
- Original run: October 28, 2009 – February 28, 2018
- Volumes: 15
- Anime television series
- Directed by: Chiaki Kon
- Written by: Michiko Yokote
- Music by: Hiroshi Takaki
- Studio: Doga Kobo
- Licensed by: BI: MVM Entertainment; NA: Sentai Filmworks
- Original network: TV Tokyo, AT-X, TVA, TVO
- English network: Anime Network
- Original run: July 7, 2013 – September 22, 2013
- Episodes: 12
- icon

Devils and Realist (Japanese: 魔界王子 devils and realist, Hepburn: Makai Ōji: Devils and Realist) is a Japanese manga series written by Madoka Takadono and illustrated by Utako Yukihiro. It was serialized in Ichijinsha's josei manga magazine Monthly Comic Zero Sum from October 2009 to February 2018, with its chapters collected in fifteen tankōbon volumes as of July 2018.

Seven Seas Entertainment licensed the manga for an English-language release in North America; they published the fifteen volumes between April 2014, and March 2019. An anime adaptation was animated by Doga Kobo and aired from July 2013 to September 2013, licensed in North America by Sentai Filmworks.

== Plot ==
England, 1889. Seventeen-year-old William Twining, a genius aristocrat, learns of his family's bankruptcy and finds his life suddenly turned upside down when he accidentally summons a demon in his family's basement while looking for money to pay for his tuition. The demon, Dantalion, reveals to William that he is the "Elector" — the one who can choose the interim ruler over Hell as its emperor, Lucifer, rests to regain his strength — and a descendant of King Solomon, who had powers over demons known as his seventy-two pillars. William, who is a scientific realist, does not believe in demons and refuses to become involved with the power struggle in Hell. However, Dantalion stays close to William and decides to go to his school until he is chosen to be the interim king. Dantalion is joined by Sytry and Camio, his fellow pillars and interim candidates, as they become attached to the reincarnation of their beloved master. As more powerful figures learn of William's ancient heritage and plot to use him to their benefits, William finds himself at the center of a war between Hell and Heaven while discovering the mysteries that surrounds him and Solomon's enigmatic past.

== Characters ==
=== Main characters ===
William Twining (ウイリアム・トワイニング, Uiriamu Towainingu)
Voiced by: Takuya Eguchi
The protagonist and the reincarnation/descendant of King Solomon (though he seems to have no recollection of his past life), William is the orphaned son of a British noble family that's older than the British royal family and takes great pride of his family's lineage. Highly intelligent, William has been the top of his class three years running at Stradford and is also a fifth-year prefect. Despite his family's bankruptcy, he maintains lofty dreams of high-class society for his future, though he constantly worries about how to pay for his school fees with his considerable financial situation.

William considers himself a realist and does not believe in demons or angels, but gradually become more accepting as he starts getting involved with the supernatural, though he strongly wishes to stay out of it. As Solomon's reincarnation, he retains an ability to negate the demonic powers of the 72 pillars demons. As the closest descendant of Solomon, he's also the one who holds Solomon's soul and is the "Elector", the human with the ability to choose the next temporary emperor of Hell while Lucifer rests.

Kevin Cecil (ケヴィン・セシル, Kevin Seshiru)
Voiced by: Jun Fukuyama
Kevin is the butler and general manservant to William and his family has served the Twining family for many generations. Kevin enjoys gambling and sometimes make bets on his master, which irritates William and result in being punished. As the only servant that stayed with William after the Twining family bankruptcy, he looks after the mansion and tends to his master needs, but he later replaced Ernest Crosby as priest at Stradford School when he was debilitated. Unknown to William, Kevin's real name is Uriel (ウリエル, Urieru), the arch-angel known as the Angel of Repentance and Cruelty, and had history with Solomon, tasked with punishing him for rebelling against God and tried to ascend his soul to Heaven, which he failed at.

Furthermore, he's been impersonating the real Kevin Cecil since the death of William's parents. His angelic form is now marked by the absence of a wing, taken by the Archangel Michael, and holds much influence among English churches. Once William learned that he was not the real Kevin Cecil, he eventually comes clean about his true identity to William, who forgives him for his lies.

Dantalion (ダンタリオン, Dantarion)
Voiced by: Takuma Terashima
Dantalion is the Grand Duke of Hell, commander of the 36 armies of Hell and a Nephilim demon candidate to succeed the throne of the demon world while Lucifer slumbers. He is the 71st pillar of Soloman's 72 pillars, and is followed by two bat-familiars, Amon and Mamon. Having annihilated an entire tribe in his past life, Dantalion became a demon after contracting with Lucifer and become known as "The One Who Plays the Flute". As the only contractee Lucifer ever had, Dantalion is Lucifer's direct descendant and possesses powers that could surpass the Four Kings of Hell. While disguised at William's school, he calls himself "Dantalion Huber" and participates in various sports, making him popular with the jocks.

Sytry (シトリー, Shitorī)
Voiced by: Yoshitsugu Matsuoka
As a fallen angel, Sytry is a pure demon, and thus looks down upon demons that were formerly human. The 12th pillar of Solomon, and also a viscount and Prince of Hell who reigns over 60 armies of Hell. He is also a candidate nominated to succeed the throne by his abusive and controlling uncle, Baalberith. It was later revealed that Sytry's mother is Gabriel and that he was never a fallen angel, rather his uncle sealed his angelic powers and deceive Sytry and everyone that he has fallen. Metatron eventually captures Sytry and takes him back to Heaven, brainwashing him into taking over his mother's mantle as the new "Gabriel". In his true form, Sytry has the face of a leopard and wings of a griffin, and can take the form of a handsome man or beautiful woman. He has the ability to stir up human desire and make women show themselves naked if he desires. While disguised at William's school, he calls himself "Sytry Cartwright" and is treated like a princess at Stradford School because of his beauty.

Camio (カミオ, Kamio)
Voiced by: Tetsuya Kakihara
A demon general, Camio is the 53rd pillar who commands 30 armies and a Great President of Hell. He is a half-demon, born from the illegitimate union of his human mother, Princess Cassandra of Troy, and Lucifer, therefore possess power surpassing the Four Kings. His human form is that of a young man holding a saber, but his true form is that of a thrush. He can tell his summoner what birds and animals are saying, as well as the meaning behind the sound that water makes. He is a candidate for substitute king nominated by Beelzebub. At Stradford School, Camio goes under the alias "Nathan Caxton" and is the Head Boy, who William admires.

Isaac Morton (アイザック・モートン, Aizakku Mōton)
Voiced by: Motoki Takagi
Isaac is a friend to William at Stradford School and has a heavily interest in the arcane and occult arts. Although Isaac and William have contrasting personalities, they are good friends and Isaac takes part of the supernatural surrounding William with joy. While not as intelligent as William, Isaac has more knowledge about the demon world and shown to be more skilled in using magic than him. He is descended from merchants and his father gained a fortune trading spices and tea from India.

=== Demons ===
Gilles de Rais (ジルドレイ, Jiru do Rei)
Voiced by: Kousuke Toriumi
Gilles "Bluebeard" de Rais was the previous incarnation of the murderous general of Jeanne d'Arc, his full name being: "Baron de Rais and Count of Brienne, Gilles de Monmorency-Laval". Gilles has been dead for around 400 years, and is currently a Nephilim subordinate to the Great Demon Duke Baalberith. He is in love with Jeanne and seeks power in order to break Michael's hold over her and make her human again.

Astaroth (アシュタロス, Ashutarosu)
Voiced by: Sachi Kokuryu
A dark-skinned woman, Astaroth is the Southern Grand Duchess of Hell, and the leader of 40 armies. A grand demon considered to be as strong as Beelzebub, she is ranked 29th in Hell. She is also the former wife to Beelzebub, mother of Lamia, and the leader of the Nephilim. She is also the guardian to Dantalion, as well as the one who nominated him as a candidate for substitute king. Her previous incarnation was the Queen of Egypt Hatshepsut, who died of cavities, and an ancestor of Solomon. As the war between Hell and Heaven escalates, Astaroth goes to rest to restore her power and prolong her lifespan, leaving Dantalion without any support.

Baalberith (バアルベリト, Baaruberito)
Voiced by: Keiji Fujiwara
The Western Duke and leader of the Anti-Nephilim faction, he chose Sytry as his candidate for substitute king. Although Sytry is his nephew, he treats him poorly, considering him as his "puppet", and was the one that caused Sytry to become a demon.

Beelzebub (ベルゼビュート, Beruzebyūto)
Voiced by: Shinnosuke Tachibana
The Northern Duke and former husband of Astaroth, Beelzebub is a top-level demon who commands 16 armies, one of the kings of the four corners of the world, and one of the seven demon kings. He chose Camio as his candidate for substitute king.

Samael (サマエル, Samaeru)
Voiced by: Akira Ishida
The Eastern Duke and Chief Steward of the demon world, Samael is the only king that has not chosen a candidate for substitute king as he is more loyal to Lucifer and continues to carry out his orders, setting numerous plots into motion.

Lamia (ラミア, Ramia)
Voiced by: Shiori Mikami
Lamia is 77th in the demonic hierarchy with a court rank of princess. She is greatly infatuated with Dantalion, going far as claiming to be his fiancée. She is the daughter of Astaroth and Beelzebub, currently under the care of her mother and takes orders from her.

Amon (アモン) and Mamon (マモン)
Voiced by: Kazutomi Yamamoto (Amon), Yūto Suzuki (Mamon)
Black bat Amon and white bat Mamon are Dantalion's familiars and acts as his informants/observers when concerning William's status and liaisons to Hell. Although they adore their master and fear his temper, they are not above dragging Dantalion back to the demon world to fulfill his duties.

Baphomet (バフォメット, Bafometto)
Voiced by: Hiroki Yasumoto
Baphomet is a black-furred goat butler of Dantalion and an earl. He looks after Dantalion's home, and can cook delicious food and desserts.

Leonard (レオナール, Reonāru)
Voiced by: Kenshō Ono
Leonard is a white-furred sheep butler of Sytry and rival to Dantalion's butler, Baphomet. Like Baphomet, he can cook delicious food and desserts.

Eligos (エリュゴス, Eryugosu)
Voiced by: Yū Kobayashi
Eligos is the 15th pillar of Solomon with the rank of marchioness, commander of 60 armies, and subordinate to Beelzebub.

Lucifer (ルシファー, Rushifā)
The emperor of Hell and a fallen angel, Lucifer rebelled against God and was beaten down by his brother Michael and sent to Hell. To preserve his eternal life, he must rest periodically and in that period, a substitute king is named.

=== Humans ===
Solomon (ソロモン, Soromon)
Voiced by: Mitsuki Saiga
King Solomon of Israel was the illegitimate son of David, and spent his childhood imprisoned and learning to use magic and summon demons. Solomon was known for his master intelligence, hailed as the greatest wise man in the world and the one blessed by God. Although Solomon was beloved by his people, he spend his time with his demons and got along peacefully with many of them, and even had a deep bond with Lucifer. He was particularly close to Dantalion, who was his first demon and was killed by him upon his wishes.

Mycroft Swallow (マイクロフト・スワロー, Maikurofuto Suwarō)
Voiced by: Yūki Ono
Mycroft is another friend and fellow prefect to William at Stradford, they usually do favors for each other and Swallow sometimes covers William when he disappears. Unlike Isaac, he has no knowledge about the demon world that surrounds William, but was involved with an incident relating to demons after his father make a contract with Eligos.

Ernest Crosby (アーネスト・クロスビー, Ānesuto Kurosubī)
Voiced by: Kazuyuki Okitsu
Ernest Crosby is the former pastor for the Stradford church and member of the "Hand of God," a special organization of exorcists.

Samuel Liddell Mathers (サミュエル・リドル・メイザース, Samyueru Ridoru Meizāsu)
A magician, former member of the "Hand of God" and Count of Glenstrae, Mathers wishes to strengthen the human race to prevent demons and angels from using them. He took the position of a teacher at Stradford School in order to teach William how to use magic, and even allowed Isaac to practice with them.

Maria Mollins (マリア・モリンズ, Maria Morinzu)
Voiced by: Emi Shinohara, Chinatsu Akasaki (young)
Maria Mollins is the former dormitory mother of Stradford School, and was considered to be a strict but caring woman with students. As a young girl, she met Camio and learned of his demon heritage. She fell in love with him, but Camio disappeared to protect her from the demon world. She is reunited with him years later and then left the school due to lung problems, but Camio visits her frequently.

Adrian Swallow (エイドリアン・スワロー, Eidorian Suwarō)
Voiced by: Dai Matsumoto
Adrian Swallow was the father of Mycroft Swallow and a baron politician. After an accident that should have caused him to die, he made a deal with Eligos for his soul to live longer, but was eventually destroyed by the exorcists.

Elizabeth Dale (エリザベス・デール, Erizabesu Dēru)
Elizabeth is the proposed fiancée for Mycroft Swallow, whom she calls "Mike". She is an American with a loud demeanor, which causes her to be ridiculed by the high class women of England.

Elliot Eden (エリオット・イーデン, Eriotto Īden)
Elliot Eden is an intelligent boy at Stradford School that comes from a line of reverends, and was possessed by Michael in order to meet William at school.

Barton Twining (バートン・ツイニング, Bāton Towainingu)
Barton Twining is the uncle of William Twining, and was in charge of William's assets after losing his parents and took him under his care. He is also an archaeologist and funds archaeological digs. When his business fails and goes bankrupt, the debt collectors take all possessions from the Twining estate and he disappears after the bankruptcy.

=== Angels ===
Michael (ミカエル, Mikaeru)
Voiced by: Hiroshi Kamiya
Michael is a cruel and devious archangel, the Chief of Angels and "The One Who Resembles God". He is the brother of Lucifer and plots to make sure his brother does not return to his throne and make William into a pawn for Heaven. Since he is active and giving orders to Kevin, he is fading from lack of rest.

Raguel (ラグエル, Ragueru)
Voiced by: Jun'ichi Miyake
Raguel is mysterious young man and an exorcist for the "Hand of God", as well as an angel that serves under Uriel. He is very devoted to Kevin/Uriel and is aware of his conflicted loyalties to William and Heaven.

Metatron (メタトロン)
A high-ranking angel, Metatron is the Chief of the Virtues and was once a human. Although childish and happy-go-lucky, Metatron possesses a duplicitous and manipulative nature with a strong fixation on Michael, whom he seeks to overthrow.

Jeanne d'Arc (ジャンヌダルク, Jannu Daruku)
Voiced by: Saki Fujita
Jeanne was a former famous heroine who was turned into a loyal soldier for Heaven by Michael and is a general for his "Army of Salvation". Due to her strength and skills, she is slated to become an archangel on Michael's nomination.

== Media ==
=== Manga ===
Written by Madoka Takadono and illustrated by Utako Yukihiro, Devils and Realist was serialized in Ichijinsha's Josei manga magazine Monthly Comic Zero Sum. Its first installment was published in the magazine's December 2009 issue on October 28, 2009. (Note: It started in the magazine's December issue of 2009 (cover date December 1), which was released on October 28.) The series finished its final installment in the April 2018 issue of Monthly Comic Zero Sum, published on February 28, 2018. (Note: It ended in the magazine's April issue of 2009 (cover date April 1), which was released on October 28.) Ichijinsha collected its chapters in fifteen tankōbon volumes, released from May 25, 2010, to July 25, 2018. Limited editions versions are also published that features alternative book covers and special color arts.

In North America, Del Rey Manga announced the English language release of the series in May 2013. The fifteen volumes were published between April 15, 2014, and March 12, 2019. In France, it was licensed by Tonkam. in Germany by Carlsen Comics, in Italy by Goen, and Taiwan by Ever Glory Publishing.

==== Volumes ====
No.	Original release date	Original ISBN	English release date	English ISBN
1	May 25, 2010	978-4-75-805508-6	April 15, 2014	978-1-626920-32-3
2	November 25, 2010	978-4-75-805556-7	July 15, 2014	978-1-626920-42-2
3	November 25, 2010	978-4-75-805605-2	November 18, 2014	978-1-626920-82-8
4	December 24, 2011	978-4-75-805672-4	February 17, 2015	978-1-626921-12-2
5	June 25, 2012	978-4-75-805718-9	May 5, 2015	978-1-626921-28-3
6	December 25, 2012	978-4-75-805774-5	August 4, 2015	978-1-626921-66-5
7	June 25, 2013	978-4-75-805826-1; 978-4-75-805827-8 (LE)	November 17, 2015	978-1-626921-80-1
8	December 25, 2013	978-4-75-805868-1; 978-4-75-805869-8 (LE)	March 1, 2016	978-1-626921-81-8
9	December 25, 2013	978-4-75-805917-6; 978-4-75-805918-3 (LE)	May 17, 2016	978-1-626922-68-6
10	December 25, 2013	978-4-75-805974-9; 978-4-75-805975-6 (LE)	August 9, 2016	978-1-626922-94-5
11	July 25, 2015	978-4-75-803077-9; 978-4-75-803078-6 (LE)	November 8, 2016	978-1-626923-52-2
12	July 25, 2015	978-4-75-803147-9; 978-4-75-803148-6 (LE)	April 25, 2017	978-1-626924-50-5
13	October 25, 2016	978-4-75-803235-3; 978-4-75-803236-0 (LE)	November 28, 2017	978-1-626925-13-7
14	July 25, 2017	978-4-75-803299-5; 978-4-75-803300-8 (LE)	March 27, 2018	978-1-626925-74-8
15	July 25, 2017	978-4-75-803371-8; 978-4-75-803372-5 (LE)	March 12, 2019	978-1-626926-99-8

=== Anime ===
It was announced on December 24, 2012, that an anime adaptation of the series was in production, consisting of twelve episodes, and premiered on July 7, 2013. Crunchyroll streamed the series with English subtitles as it airs in Japan. The anime has been licensed in North America by Sentai Filmworks.

The anime television series is produced by Doga Kobo and Pony Canyon, directed by Chiaki Kon, written by Michiko Yokote, and features character designs by Kikuko Sadakata. The opening and ending themes, "Believe My Dice" and "a shadow's love song", respectively, are performed by Takuya Eguchi, Takuma Terashima, Yoshitsugu Matsuoka, and Tetsuya Kakihara. A CD for the songs was released on July 24, 2013.

The first Makai Ouji: Devils and Realist Blu-ray/DVD set was released on September 18, 2013, and the second set was released on October 16, 2013. The third set was released on November 20, 2013, and the fourth set on December 18, 2013. The fifth set was released January 1, 2014 and the sixth and final set on February 19, 2014. Limited editions of the Blu-ray/DVD included special goods and alternative disc covers.

==== Episode list ====
No.	Title	Original release date
1	"Pillar 1 - Devil and Realist"; Transliteration: "Dai 1-hashira「devil and realist」" (Japanese: 第1柱「devil and realist」)	July 7, 2013
Intelligent, young noble William Twining maintains his spot as the top student of his school before the holidays start. When the principal tells him that his tuition has not been paid, William goes home to ask his uncle about it, only to discover that they had gone bankrupt. In order to find a way to pay for his tuition, William breaks down the door to the secret family treasury, cutting himself in the process. His blood drips onto a drawing on the ground and a man appears, calling himself Dantalion, Grand Duke of Hell, and tells William to elect him to be king of Hell. Being a realist, William refuses to believe Dantalion's words about demons and has him dragged away by the police. When William returns to the treasury to find Dantalion's appearance "trick", he is transported to Dantalion's mansion in Hell. He meets Baphomet, the goat butler, who explains the election for interim king and their world. They are soon attacked by another demon, Gilles de Rais, who engages Dantalion in ferocious battle upon the latter's arrival, causing the warp space between the human world and Hell. William, not wanting to be stuck in Hell, orders Dantalion to stop, and Dantalion unwillingly does. Having learned of William's status as the "Elector", Gilles leaves to report back to his master. Dantalion calls William and asks if he has really forgotten him, much to William's bewilderment. Later, William returns to the human world and to school, where he learns that his tuition was paid by an anonymous donator. Wondering whom the mysterious donator is, William sits in class when Dantalion comes in and introduces himself as a new student.
2	"Pillar 2 - Human and Angel"; Transliteration: "Dai 2-hashira「human and angel」" (Japanese: 第2柱「human and angel」)	July 14, 2013
Isaac attempts to summon a demon to form a contract with it, but another candidate for Lucifer's throne, Sytry, disrupts Isaac's ritual, and demands the latter to take him to the Elector or he will lose his soul. Meanwhile, Dantalion reveals to William that he was the one paid for his tuition and that he will stay until he is chosen for the throne. William refuses to be indebted to him and asks a friend and fellow perfect, Mycroft Swallow, to give him scholarship forms so he can pay for his tuition on his own. Dantalion becomes popular with the jocks at school, but later leaves to attend business in Hell. Using Isaac, Sytry approaches William as an underclassman and proposes that his uncle could be his "patron" after William meets him. Desperate to get rid of Sytry, Isaac tries to summon an angel to defeat the former, but summons a demon boar that chases after him and William instead. Sytry kills it and reveals his true nature as the viscount and twelfth noble of Hell and one of Lucifer's candidates to an uncaring William. To force William's hand, Sytry captures Isaac, who is then saved by Dantalion. The two demons engage in a battle until William forces them to stop, who then declares that he will not elect anyone for the throne before leaving. While Isaac takes delight in William's status as the Elector and a descendant of Solomon, Sytry informs William that he will be staying at the school, a fact that he reluctantly accepts. At William's manor, his butler, Kevin Cecil, opens a box containing the ring that once belonged to Solomon that given was to him by God.
3	"Pillar 3 - Exorcist and Ghost"; Transliteration: "Dai 3-hashira「exorcist and ghost」" (Japanese: 第3柱「exorcist and ghost」)	July 21, 2013
Pastor Crosby is alerted of Lucifer's candidates' competition to become the interim ruler of Hell, and sets out to exorcise them. Becoming increasingly popular with their classmates, Dantalion and Sytry continue to enjoy school life at Stradford, much to William's annoyance. William goes to the church and inquires if Crosby he could exorcise demons, although he does not reveal Dantalion's and Sytry's identities to him. Later on, William orders Dantalion to stay away from him, but is then warned by the latter that his orders will only work on Solomon's seventy-two pillars and that more demons will come after him. In addition, Dantalion asks why William cannot remember him in his past life, angering him. At night, William, Isaac, and Sytry venture into the woods to investigate a rumor of a ghost haunting their dormitory. They discovered that it is actually a low-leveled demon under Crosby's command, who lures them to the church to weaken Sytry's powers in order to kill him. Dantalion arrives and offers to save Sytry if William requests it, who refuses because he does not to rely on Dantalion. Crosby informs Dantalion that, despite William being a human, he will kill him due to his status as the Elector. Dantalion easily defeats Crosby, but is unable to deliver the finishing blow when William orders him to stop. While William decides to no longer deny the existence of demons, Crosby escapes to relay William's status to his organization, the Hand of God. The next day, the headmaster introduces Kevin as the new priest of the school.
4	"Pillar 4 - An Old Love Story"; Transliteration: "Dai 4-hashira「an old love story」" (Japanese: 第4柱「an old love story」)	July 28, 2013
Kevin requests William to keep his distance from him now that he is working at Stradford. William is shocked by Kevin's cold demeanor, but acquiesces to his wish. Later that night, William and the dormitory mother, Maria Mollins, confronts three boys who broke a window. The next day, he overhears the boys planning to break into Maria's room to find something to blackmail her with, much to his irritation. While skipping boating lessons, he spots the Head Boy, Nathan Caxton, acting suspiciously around Maria's room. Shortly thereafter, William barges into her room when he heard a crash and finds a magic circle drawn onto the floor. During the boat race, Nathan exposes his identity as a demon to Dantalion and William when he uses his power to save Maria from a broken oar flying in her direction. At night, Sytry informs William that Maria opened a portal from Hell in order to summon a demon to form a contract with it. The demon attempts to attack Maria, but she is then saved by Nathan in his demon form. Dantalion arrives and explains that Nathan's true name is Camio, a half-demon born from a human woman, one of Solomon's pillars, and a candidate for Lucifer's throne. Maria and Camio reminisce over their past and her desire to become a demon when she dies from her lung disease. Dantalion advises Camio to let Maria die as a human rather than becoming a Nephilim. On Maria's suggestion, Camio decides to remain in the school so he will not be alone once she is dead. Before Maria retires from Stradford to enter treatment for her illness, the three boys that broke into her room comes by and apologizes for stealing an old photo of her and Camio.
5	"Pillar 5 - Mill and Flour"; Transliteration: "Dai 5-hashira「mill and flour」" (Japanese: 第5柱「mill and flour」)	August 4, 2013
Solely focus on his education and tuition, William remains unconcerned about the election for the interim ruler of Hell and proceeds with life at school. Camio informs William that an old water mill located at the back of the Headmaster's House is preparing to be torn down to make room for a new building at the school and wants him to catch the students who have been causing a ruckus at night with an odd song before the school's chairman comes to check on the construction for it. William accepts the assignment, thinking that it might help with his tuition if he wins the headmaster's good graces. Dantalion dislikes the fact that William seems to favor Camio and gets into an argument with him about the election and how William still refuses to rely on him. Afterwards, William, Isaac, and Sytry investigate the old mill, but left after Isaac was frightened by the rustlings in the forest. Meanwhile, Dantalion visits his guardian, Astaroth, to talk about Camio and she warns Dantalion that he be should more concern about another powerful person close to William. At night, William and Isaac wake up to singing and find a goblin-like creature lurking in the mill. Sytry tells them that the creature is a killmoulis, a fairy that has to mill grains or it will die. William sends the killmoulis to India to work at Isaac's father's tea and spices factory as a solution, but is disappointed that he was unable to receive any merit for his efforts. Later that evening, Dantalion confronts Kevin about his true identity and boasts that he will uncover all of the latter's secrets.
6	"Pillar 6 - The One Who Scheme"; Transliteration: "Dai 6-hashira「the one who scheme」" (Japanese: 第6柱「the one who scheme」)	August 11, 2013
Still hurt by Kevin's distant behavior, Isaac encourages an upset William to invite Kevin to family day at the school to find a chance to talk to him. During the event, Mycroft asks William to let him take the day off to avoid meeting with his father, Adrian Swallow, due to the pressure of being sent to a military school after his father's near-death accident. Adrian meets William, slightly disturbing the latter when the former invited him to dinner, but Kevin intervenes before William could accept. On his parents' behest, Mycroft requests that William comes to his manor to meet his family. Sensing Beelzebub at work, Dantalion and Sytry tag along to protect William, although they have no intention to interfere with Beelzebub's affairs in accordance to demon law. William dozes off at the party being held the manor and awakens to find that Adrian's corpse is possessed by demon, Eligos, one of Solomon's pillars and Beelzebub's subordinate. Eligos tries to kill William for her master, but Dantalion saves him. When Sytry and Mycroft enter the room, Eligos plans to take Mycroft's soul once she realizes that she is outnumbered. William wishes to save Mycroft, but Sytry stops him and explains that Eligos has the right to take Mycroft's soul because of the law. Dantalion volunteers to save Mycroft if William elects him to rule Hell, but then an exorcist and servant of Kevin, Raguel, arrives and tries to exorcise Eligos, who escapes. Returning to school, William and Kevin reconcile. Later that day, Kevin is revealed to be the archangel Uriel as he speaks to Raguel, who pleads with him to leave the school. However, Kevin is determined to stay so the demons will not take Solomon's soul.
7	"Pillar 7 - Party and Battle"; Transliteration: "Dai 7-hashira「party and battle」" (Japanese: 第7柱「party and battle」)	August 18, 2013
Beelzebub warns Camio things are different now that the latter's identity is revealed, though Camio replies that he is now interested in the covenants he and Dantalion made to Solomon long ago. Meanwhile, Stradford is putting on a production of the play Hamlet with William as the director, Dantalion as Claudius, and Sytry as Ophelia. Later, Gilles de Rais comes to the school to remind Dantalion and Sytry that they must attend the annual Great Sabbat in Hell, which will also be attended by the Four Kings. At the party, it is revealed that Camio is the offspring of Lucifer and has power surpassing that of the Four Kings. Sytry's uncle, Baalberith, sends a horde of demons to the human world to kill William in a plot to take Solomon's soul. After Dantalion flashbacks to a memory with Solomon and remembers that it was Solomon's wish to die by Dantalion's hands someday, Amon informs Dantalion about Baalberith's plan. Sytry, Dantalion, and Baphomet rush to the human world to protect William, who still refuses to elect anyone for Lucifer's throne. When a demon was about to attack William, the barrier that was placed on him by Kevin earlier appears and surrounds Dantalion, oppressing his powers and causing him to go berserk. Before Dantalion could kill William, Camio arrives to stop him and orders the demons away. Afterwards, William brushes off what happened with Dantalion to help ease the latter's guilt. On the night of the play, William is forced to play as Hamlet and scolds Dantalion and Sytry for ruining it with their antics.
8	"Pillar 8 - Pain and Ecstasy"; Transliteration: "Dai 8-hashira「pain and ecstasy」" (Japanese: 第8柱「pain and ecstasy」)	August 25, 2013
Archangel Michael visits Kevin at the school, demanding to know why he is allowing William to roam freely when he knows that the demons are after his soul. Desiring to observe William, Michael poses as a student at the school named Elliot Eden and boldly challenges William to take first place on an upcoming exam. Initially irritated by him, William meets Michael later in the library and befriends him. However, Dantalion is suspicious of "Elliot", sensing that he has "too much light". During the exam, Michael uses his powers to transfer notes from another student's desk onto William's, causing him to be accused of cheating and sent to the punishment room to await his trial. While there, Isaac and Camio visit him, the latter offering his assistance to help prove William's innocence. Michael comes to see William that night, questioning if he would choose Heaven or Hell, but is chased away by Kevin's arrival. At the trial, Michael transports William and Isaac to another dimension and prepares to perform "ecstasy" on William to turn him into Heaven's pawn. Dantalion appears and engages in a battle with Michael, who tells the former that he knew Dantalion when he was human and taunts him of his past cruelty. Enraged, Dantalion defeats Michael and Kevin intervenes before Dantalion could kill him. Michael returns to Heaven, and William is proven innocent with Camio's help back at the trial. In Hell, Baalberith informs Gilles de Rais that there is a possibility that Lucifer will not awaken from his sleep while Astaroth plans to bring William to Hell to protect him from Heaven.
9	"Pillar 9 - Vice and Virginity"; Transliteration: "Dai 9-hashira「vice and virginity」" (Japanese: 第9柱「vice and virginity」)	September 1, 2013
Michael sends his prized soldier, Jeanne d'Arc, to Hell to act as a distraction so Kevin (Uriel) will be able to perform the ecstasy ceremony on William. While looking for Kevin in his room, William discovers his family ring, which causes him to remember the death of his parents and how Kevin consoled him after their funeral. Once there, Kevin sends William away to talk to Michael about Heaven's plan to lure the demons away from William, and the latter threatens to take the former's last wing if he fails to acquire Solomon's soul. Outside, William sneaks the ring out and runs into Dantalion, Sytry, and Camio. They inform him they must return to Hell to deal with an emergency and warns him to be careful while they are gone, much to his annoyance. While Jeanne engages the demons on the battlefield, Kevin tries to perform the ceremony and finds out that William rejects it for some reason. Appointed to guard William, Gilles de Rais goes to stop Kevin, but is deterred by Raguel. Gilles expresses his utter hatred and disgust of Heaven and its angels, as they were the ones that turned his "beloved Jeanne" into their pawn. Raguel tells Gilles that Jeanne is in Hell, but Gilles disregards the information and professes his desire to defile Jeanne to free her from Heaven's ecstasy. To save Raguel, Kevin agrees to cease the ceremony on William. However, Gilles moves in to kill both of them until Dantalion interferes. While Dantalion orders Amon and Mamon to take Gilles back to Hell, Kevin reports to Michael about his failure. Although prepared to take Uriel's last wing, Michael demands that Uriel leaves, distressed that he is beginning to fade from existence.
10	"Pillar 10 - Another Battle -As An Intermission-"; Transliteration: "Dai 10-hashira「Another Battle -as an intermission-」" (Japanese: 第10柱「Another Battle -as an intermission-」)	September 8, 2013
Stradford is holding their annual culture festival on campus, where the students set up booths in order to compete for the most brooches as part of their curriculum. After seeing how well Sytry's booth is doing, Dantalion and Isaac begin their own booth, both of them becoming increasingly popular. However, William, wanting to use this as an opportunity to raise money for his tuition and boost his grades, is unable to formulate an idea for the festival. Manipulating Dantalion and the others (including Gilles de Rais, who was at the school to help with Sytry's booth), William decides to use to them as workers for his café. Soon, he is approached by Baphomet and Sytry's butler, Leonard, in their human forms and is asked to be a judge for the butlers' cooking competition. Ultimately, Baphomet is declared the winner, much to Leonard's dismay. Afterwards, William makes Baphomet and Leonard serve as chefs for the café. Although William's café did well, Camio is proclaimed the winner of the culture festival. Note: Rashid (voiced by Yoshimasa Hosoya) and Hebdar (voiced by Tomokazu Sugita), the two original characters from the 3DS game, made cameo appearances within the crowd of students.
11	"Pillar 11 - King and Ring"; Transliteration: "Dai 11-hashira「king and ring」" (Japanese: 第11柱「king and ring」)	September 15, 2013
Reflecting on his previous plan's failure, Michael meets with Uriel to discuss their next strategy to obtain Solomon's soul. In Hell, the Four Kings unanimously agree to bring William to Hell to protect him from Heaven, and tasks Astaroth to bring William to them. Sent by her mother Astaroth, Lamia appears at Stradford and drags William and delivers him to a meeting composed of Sytry, Camio, the Four Kings, and other aristocratic demons. Due to William's dismissive attitude on the election for interim king, a demon tries to attack William out of rage, but Dantalion appears and defends him. Solomon's Ring of Wisdom, which William still has in his possession, falls out of his clothes and the demons recognize it as the ring that Solomon used to enslave them. Determined to put an end to Solomon's control over the demons and gain power, Baalberith and his minions move in to kill William, who slips the ring onto his finger, causing Solomon's soul to take over his body. While Michael and Kevin sense this from Heaven, Solomon easily fends off the demons and uses his power blessed by God to nearly eradicate Hell. As Solomon greets each of his former demon friends and pillars, Dantalion goes to remove the ring to no avail. Dantalion is shocked to learn that he is the only one Solomon does not recognize.
12	"Pillar 12 - Realist but Romanticist"; Transliteration: "Dai 12-hashira「realist but romanticist」" (Japanese: 第12柱「realist but romanticist」)	September 22, 2013
Solomon, who has forgotten Dantalion's identity, demands that Dantalion should not interfere with his battle against Baalberith and the other demons. Unable to go against him, Dantalion is beaten down by Solomon's powers as he remembers their past together: Despite being imprisoned by his father, King David, and being labeled as "a child of sin", Solomon summoned demons and subjected them under his control while also befriending many of them. Despite being powerful, Solomon did not raise arms against his father and lived most of his life peacefully with his demon companions, much to Dantalion's bewilderment. After crushing his father's army that was sent to kill him, Solomon took over the kingdom of Israel. Although Solomon showed his father mercy, David refused to acknowledge him as his son and cursed him, much to Solomon's sadness. Soon after, Solomon requested to die by Dantalion's hands. Regaining consciousness, Dantalion saves Baalberith from being destroyed by Solomon and urges William to remember who he is to break Solomon's control. Lucifer awakens from his sleep and meets with Solomon, who then allows Dantalion to remove his ring to release his control over William. With Lucifer awake, the election for the interim ruler is halted and William is returned to the human world. However, William is distraught to learn that no one at the school, except for him (and Kevin), remembers Dantalion, Sytry, and Camio. On his way out from visiting Kevin at the church, Solomon's ring falls out of his clothes and is picked up by Dantalion, who smiles and asks William to take good care of it.

=== Music ===
A CD for the opening and ending songs was released on July 24, 2013. On November 6, 2013, an album of ten character songs was released and performed by the voice actors of the main characters. As part of the album, it contains a solo versions of "Believe My Dice" performed by William's voice actor, Takuya Eguchi, and Sytry's voice actor, Yoshitsugu Matsuoka, respectively. Dantalion's voice actor, Takuma Terashima, and Camio's voice actor, Tetsuya Kakihara, performed their respective solo versions of "a shadow's love song".

=== Drama CDs ===
A limited edition drama CD titled "「realist and companion」" was released and sold during the 84th Comiket. Buyers who purchased the DVD/Blu-ray sets at Animate received a special drama CD titled "「realist and steward」".

=== Publications ===
On July 6, 2013, the "Makai Ouji: Devils and Realist Introduction Guide" (魔界王子 devils and realist イントロダクションガイ) was released. It contains artworks of its manga and anime series, and interviews with Madoka Takadono, Utako Yukihiro, Michiko Yokote, and Chiaki Kon. The "Utako Yukihiro's Artworks: Makai Ouji: Devils and Realist" (雪広うたこ アートワークス 魔界王子devils and realist) and "Makai Ouji Official Fanbook" (魔界王子devils and realist 公式ファンブック) were released on September 25, 2013.

Another book titled "Makai Ouji: Devils and Realist - Animation Fanbook" (魔界王子devils and realist アニメーションファンブック [単行本（ソフトカバー）]) was released on December 25, 2013.

=== Video game ===
Namco Bandai Games announced the development of a video game adaptation titled Makai Ōji: Devils and Realist: Treasure of the Substitute King (魔界王子 devils and realist 代理王の秘宝) for Nintendo 3DS. It features an original storyline and introduced two new characters, Rashid voiced by Yoshimasa Hosoya and Hebdar voiced by Tomokazu Sugita.

The Devils and Realist game will feature an original story featuring Rashild, a transfer student and the son of an Egyptian diplomat. William and Rashid quickly become friends, but when a mysterious intruder invades the school, they discover the existence of a treasure hidden within the school. William and Dantalion soon begin their treasure hunt, bent on grasping fame and fortune.

The game elements has decision-making points and branching storylines, as well as multiple endings. As part of the original storyline, Kevin will become a candidate for the interim ruler of Hell. As the player progress through the story as William, the game will measure William's wealth and his friendship with the demon characters (Dantalion, Sytry, and Camio) and Kevin. Since the game will include multiple endings, the story will end differently depending on whether the player choose to bond with the demons and Kevin, or follow your own desires. To help complete every route, the game will have a chart that lets the player review every decision-making point the player has passed and the player's friendship levels with the demons and Kevin.

In the limited-edition version, buyers can also receive a special CD drama, a booklet containing Utako Yukihiro's artworks and visuals, and interviews about the originals characters. The game was released on September 26, 2013.

=== Musical ===
A musical adaptation of the manga ran between June 1, 2016, to June 5 at the Zenrōsai Hall Space Zero in Shibuya, Tokyo. Tsuneyasu Motoyoshi (Emukichi-Beat) directed the musical, Naohiro Ise wrote the script, and CLIE produced the play. Mashū Ishiwatari portrayed William, Taiyō Ayukawa as Dantalion, Takuya Kawaharada as Sytry, Kōhei Norizuki as Kevin, Masato Saki as Gilles de Rais, Seiya Konishi as Isaac Morton, Kousuke Yonehara as Camio, Yūichi Matsumoto as Crosby, Ken as Baphomet, and Makoto Endō as Baalberith. A DVD of the performance shipped in October 2016 in Japan. In June 2017, a sequel to the first musical was announced and was performed in 2017 from November 4 to November 12 at Shinjuku FACE. Tsuneyasu Motoyoshi returned to direct the musical, with Naohiro Ise having returned to write the script and CLIE producing the play as well. Returning from the first musical, Mashū Ishiwatari and Taiyō Ayukawa reprised their roles as William and Dantalion, respectively.
