= Mammon (disambiguation) =

Mammon is a term from the Christian Bible used to describe material wealth or greed, often personified.

Mammon may also refer to:

== Fictional characters ==
- Mammon (comics), an antagonist in the Spawn comic book series
- Mammon (Dungeons & Dragons), a devil in the Dungeons & Dragons role-playing game
- Mammon, a Hai-Genti in the 2006 video game Maelstrom
- Mammon, an antagonist in the Reborn! anime and manga series

== Literature ==
- Mammon, or The Hardships of an Heiress, an 1855 novel by Catherine Gore
- Mammon, a novel by Maud Howe Elliott
- Mammon, Robot Born of Woman, a comedic play by Robert Llewellyn
- Mammon Inc., a 2003 novel by Hwee Hwee Tan
- Mammon, or Microsoft Internet Explorer, a character in The Book of Mozilla

== Other uses ==
- Mammon (painting), an 1885 painting by George Frederic Watts
- "Mammon", a song by Quasi from Early Recordings
- "Mammon", a song by Todd Rundgren from Liars
- "Mammon", an episode of Law & Order
- Mammon (TV series), a Norwegian TV series broadcast by NRK
