= Five Little Pigs =

1942 mystery novel by Agatha Christie

- Dust-jacket illustration of the US (true first) edition with alternative title. See Publication history (below) for UK first edition jacket image with original title.
- Author: Agatha Christie
- Cover artist: Not known
- Language: English
- Series: Hercule Poirot
- Genre: Crime novel
- Publisher: Dodd, Mead and Company
- Publication date: May 1942
- Publication place: United Kingdom; United States
- Media type: Print (hardback & paperback)
- Pages: 234 (first edition, hardback)
- ISBN: 0-00-616372-6
- Preceded by: Evil Under the Sun
- Followed by: The Hollow

Five Little Pigs is a mystery novel by British writer Agatha Christie, first published in the US by Dodd, Mead and Company in May 1942 under the title Murder in Retrospect and in the UK by the Collins Crime Club in January 1943 (although some sources state that publication was in November 1942). The UK first edition carries a copyright date of 1942 and retailed at eight shillings (Note: Equivalent to £16 in 2025.) while the US edition was priced at $2.00. (Note: Equivalent to $39 in 2025.)

In the book, detective Hercule Poirot investigates five people about a murder committed sixteen years earlier. Caroline Crale died in prison after being convicted of murdering her husband, Amyas Crale, by poisoning him. In her final letter from prison, she claims to be innocent of the murder. Her daughter Carla Lemarchant asks Poirot to investigate this cold case, based on the memories of the people closest to the couple.

== Plot summary ==
Sixteen years after Caroline Crale was convicted of fatally poisoning her husband Amyas, her twenty-one-year-old daughter Carla Lemarchant is given a letter; in it, the late Caroline claims to be innocent of the murder. Carla asks Hercule Poirot to reinvestigate the case; he does, and establishes that, on the day of the murder at the Crales' home, there were five other people present. Poirot dubs these "the five little pigs" – stockbroker Philip Blake, amateur chemist Meredith Blake (Philip's brother), Caroline's young half-sister Angela Warren, Angela's governess Cecilia Williams, and Amyas's painting model Elsa Greer. The police investigation found that Amyas had died of coniine poisoning, and Caroline confessed to stealing coniine from Meredith's lab, as she had been contemplating suicide. She had later brought a cold bottle of beer to Amyas, and both the police and the jury assumed she had poisoned the beer because Amyas was openly having an affair with Elsa.

Poirot interviews the five other suspects, noting that none has an obvious motive, and that Caroline's half-sister Angela is the only one who believes Caroline was innocent. He assembles the five, along with Carla and her fiancé, at Meredith Blake's house, and reveals the truth. Caroline was innocent, but chose not to defend herself because she believed Angela had committed the murder. Although Angela had handled the beer bottle, she had added nothing to it before her sister took it to Amyas. Caroline later assumed that her sister had added something to the beer as a prank, accidentally causing Amyas's death. When they were children, Caroline had thrown a paperweight at Angela, blinding her in one eye and scarring her face; Caroline had suffered from guilt ever since, and believed that sacrificing herself for Angela was a way to atone for her sin.

Poirot reveals the murderer was Elsa Greer. She had taken Amyas' promises to marry her seriously, unaware that he was merely lying to keep her from leaving until his "masterpiece" painting was finished. She overheard Amyas reassure Caroline that he was not going to divorce her, felt betrayed, and wanted revenge. She had seen Caroline take the poison from Meredith's lab, so she took it from Caroline's room and put it in a glass of warm beer that she gave Amyas. When Caroline later brought him a cold bottle of beer, he commented that "everything tastes foul today" after drinking it; this remark had shown Poirot that Amyas had taken the nasty-tasting coniine before Caroline brought him the beer.

Poirot's explanation solves the case to the satisfaction of Carla and her fiancé. He plans to present his findings to the police, though he admits the chances of a posthumous pardon for Caroline or a murder conviction for Elsa are slim, due to the lack of physical evidence. As she leaves, Elsa contends that Amyas and Caroline escaped her revenge, and that she, now living an empty life, is the one who really "died".

== Characters ==
- Hercule Poirot: the Belgian detective.
- Carla Lemarchant: the daughter of Caroline and Amyas Crale; born Caroline Crale II, she was aged 5 when her father was murdered at their home, Alderbury.
- John Rattery: fiancé of Carla.
- Amyas Crale: painter by profession, who liked his paintings and his mistresses but loved his wife most. He was murdered 16 years before the story opens.
- Caroline Crale: wife of Amyas, half-sister to the younger Angela Warren, of whom she was fiercely protective. She was found guilty of the murder of her husband and died in prison within a year.
- Sir Montague Depleach: Counsel for the Defence in the original trial.
- Quentin Fogg, KC: Junior for the Prosecution in the original trial.
- George Mayhew: son of Caroline's solicitor in the original trial.
- Edmunds: Managing clerk in Mayhew's firm.
- Caleb Jonathan: Family solicitor for the Crales.
- Superintendent Hale: Investigating officer in the original case.

The five people Poirot questions, who he dubs "the five little pigs" after the nursery rhyme This Little Piggy, are:

- Philip Blake: a stockbroker ("This little piggy went to market"). He expressed disdain for Caroline, but was actually attracted to her.
- Meredith Blake: Philip's elder brother, a reclusive one-time amateur herbalist who owns the adjacent property, Handcross Manor ("This little piggy stayed at home"). He had at one point hoped to marry Caroline, but after the murder he proposed to Elsa and was rejected.
- Lady Dittisham, née Elsa Greer: a spoiled society lady, formerly the twenty-year-old mistress to Amyas Crale ("This little piggy had roast beef").
- Cecilia Williams: the devoted governess ("This little piggy had none").
- Angela Warren: half-sister of Caroline Crale, a disfigured archaeologist ("This little piggy cried 'wee wee wee' all the way home"). She was a teenager at the time of the murder.

== Literary significance and reception ==
Author and critic Maurice Willson Disher's review in The Times Literary Supplement of 16 January 1943 concluded, "No crime enthusiast will object that the story of how the painter died has to be told many times, for this, even if it creates an interest which is more problem than plot, demonstrates the author's uncanny skill. The answer to the riddle is brilliant."

Maurice Richardson reviewed the novel in the 10 January 1943 issue of The Observer, writing: "Despite only five suspects, Mrs Christie, as usual, puts a ring through the reader's nose and leads him to one of her smashing last-minute showdowns. This is well up to the standard of her middle Poirot period. No more need be said."

J D Beresford in The Guardian's 20 January 1943 review, wrote: "...Christie never fails us, and her Five Little Pigs presents a very pretty problem for the ingenious reader". He concluded that the clue as to who had committed the crime was "completely satisfying".

Robert Barnard has strong praise for this novel and its plot. He remarked that it was "The-murder-in-the-past plot on its first and best appearance – accept no later substitutes. Presentation more intricate than usual, characterization more subtle." His judgment was that "All in all, it is a beautifully tailored book, rich and satisfying. The present writer would be willing to chance his arm and say that this is the best Christie of all."

Charles Osborne praised this novel, saying that "The solution of the mystery in Five Little Pigs is not only immediately convincing but satisfying as well, and even moving in its inevitability and its bleakness."

== References and allusions ==
The novel's title is from the nursery rhyme This Little Piggy, which is used by Poirot to organise his thoughts regarding the investigation. Each of the five little pigs mentioned in the nursery rhyme is used as a title for a chapter in the book, corresponding to the five suspects. Agatha Christie used this style of title in other novels, including One, Two, Buckle My Shoe, Hickory Dickory Dock, A Pocket Full of Rye, and Crooked House.

Hercule Poirot mentions the celebrated case of Hawley Harvey Crippen as an example of a crime reinterpreted to satisfy the public enthusiasm for psychology.

Romeo and Juliet is a theme among characters recalling the trial, starting with solicitor Caleb Jonathan reading Juliet's lines from the balcony scene: "If that thy bent of love...". Jonathan compares Juliet to the character of Elsa Greer, for their passion, recklessness, and lack of concern about other people.

Coniine (in the story, specifically coniine hydrobromide, derived from poison hemlock) was indeed the poison with which Socrates took his own life, as described by Phaedo, and has indeed been used to treat whooping cough and asthma. The "poisons act" referred to is the Pharmacy and Poisons Act 1933, now superseded by the Poisons Act 1972.

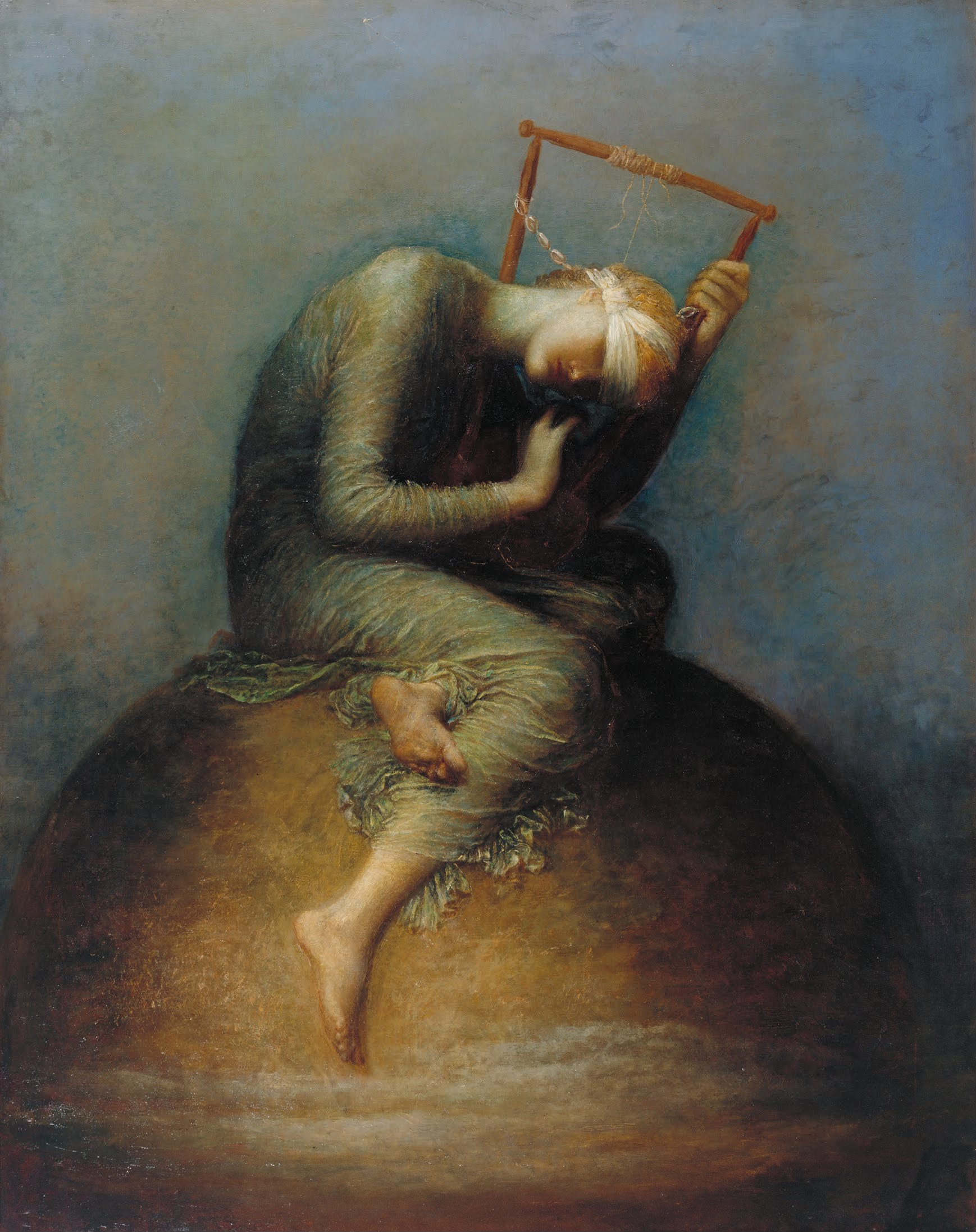
Hope by George Frederic Watts

The painting that is hung upon the wall of Cecilia Williams' room, described as a "blind girl sitting on an orange," is by George Frederic Watts and is called "Hope." In it, a blind girl is featured with a harp, which, though it has only one string left, she does not give up playing. The description is by Oswald Bastable, a character in the third book in the Bastable series by E. Nesbit, titled The New Treasure Seekers. The other identifiable prints are Dante and Beatrice, and Primavera by Botticelli.

Two of Amyas's paintings are in the Tate. Miss Williams remarks disparagingly that "So is one of Mr Epstein's statues," referring to American-born British sculptor Jacob Epstein.

When Poirot approaches Meredith Blake, he introduces himself as a friend of Lady Mary Lytton-Gore, a character known from Three Act Tragedy. This case is later referred to by Poirot many years later, in Elephants Can Remember, published in 1972.

"Take what you want and pay for it, says God" is referred to as an "old Spanish proverb" by Elsa. The same proverb is cited in Hercule Poirot's Christmas. The proverb is mentioned in South Riding (1936), by Winifred Holtby, and in Windfall's Eye (1929), by Edward Verrall Lucas.

The "interesting tombs in the Fayum" refers to the Fayum Basin south of Cairo, famous for Fayum mummy portraits.

Angela Warren refers to Shakespeare, and quotes John Milton's Comus: "Under the glassy, cool, translucent wave".

In the UK version of the story Five Little Pigs, Poirot refers to the novel The Moon and Sixpence, by W. Somerset Maugham, when he asks Angela Warren if she had recently read it at the time of the murder. Poirot deduces that Angela must have read The Moon and Sixpence from a detail given in Philip Blake's account of the murder, in which he describes an enraged Angela quarrelling with Amyas and expressing the hope that Amyas would die of leprosy. The central character of The Moon and Sixpence, Charles Strickland, is a stockbroker who deserts his wife and children to become an artist and eventually dies of leprosy. (Note: However, in the US version, Murder in Retrospect, Poirot only refers to a book of "a life of the painter Gauguin" without mentioning any title or author, but with the reference to leprosy unchanged. At one time it was thought Gauguin had died of leprosy but this had been debunked as early as 1921.)

== Adaptations ==
=== 1960 play ===
In 1960, Christie adapted the book into a play, Go Back for Murder, but edited Poirot out of the story. His function in the story is filled by a young lawyer, Justin Fogg, son of the lawyer who led Caroline Crale's defence. During the course of the play, it is revealed that Carla's fiancé is an obnoxious American who is strongly against her revisiting the case, and in the end, she leaves him for Fogg. Go Back for Murder previewed in Edinburgh, Scotland. It later came to London's Duchess Theatre on 23 March 1960, but it lasted for only thirty-seven performances.

Go Back for Murder was included in the 1978 Christie play collection, The Mousetrap and Other Plays.

=== Television ===
- 2003: Five Little Pigs – Episode 1, Series 9, of Agatha Christie's Poirot, starring David Suchet as Poirot. There were many changes to the story. Caroline was executed, instead of being sentenced to life in prison and then dying a year later. Philip has a romantic infatuation with Amyas, rather than Caroline, the root of his dislike for Caroline. Carla's name was changed to Lucy and she has no fiancé. She does not fear she has hereditary criminal tendencies; she merely wishes to prove her mother innocent. After Poirot exposes Elsa, Lucy threatens her with a pistol; Elsa dares her to shoot, but Poirot persuades her to leave Elsa to face justice.

The cast of the 2003 version includes Rachael Stirling as Caroline, Julie Cox as Elsa, Toby Stephens as Philip, Aidan Gillen as Amyas, Sophie Winkleman as adult Angela, Talulah Riley as young Angela, Aimee Mullins as Lucy, Marc Warren as Meredith, Patrick Malahide as Sir Montague Depleach, and Gemma Jones as Miss Williams.

- 2011: Cinq petits cochons – Episode 7, Series 1, of Les Petits Meurtres d'Agatha Christie, a French television series. The setting is changed to France, Poirot is omitted, and the case is solved by Émile Lampion (Marius Colucci), a police detective turned private investigator, and his former boss, Chief Inspector Larosière (Antoine Duléry). The plot is once again adapted very loosely. The character of Philip Blake is omitted. Caroline is alive and exonerated at the end. The identification of the "five little pigs" with the suspects is omitted, but the rhyme appears in the Carla character's childhood memories of her father.

=== Radio ===
Five Little Pigs was adapted for radio and broadcast on BBC Radio 4 in 1994, featuring John Moffatt as Poirot.

== Publication history ==
Dustjacket illustration of the UK First Edition (Book was first published in the US)

- 1942, Dodd Mead and Company (New York), May 1942, Hardback, 234 pp
- 1943, Collins Crime Club (London), January 1943, Hardback, 192 pp
- 1944, Alfred Scherz Publishers (Berne), Paperback, 239 pp
- 1948, Dell Books, Paperback, 192 pp (Dell number 257 [mapback])
- 1953, Pan Books, Paperback, 189 pp (Pan number 264)
- 1959, Fontana Books (Imprint of HarperCollins), Paperback, 192 pp
- 1968, Collins Crime Club (London), Hardback (reprint of 1943 ed., same dust jacket design)
- 1982, Ulverscroft Large-print Edition, Hardcover, 334 pp; ISBN 0-7089-0814-4
- 2008, Agatha Christie Facsimile Edition (Facsimile of 1943 UK First Edition), HarperCollins, 1 April 2008, Hardback; ISBN 0-00-727456-4

The novel was first serialized in the US in Collier's Weekly in ten installments from 20 September (Volume 108, Number 12) to 22 November 1941 (Volume 108, Number 21) as Murder in Retrospect with illustrations by Mario Cooper.
