= Mamon =

Mamon may refer to:

== People ==
- Józef Mamoń (1922–1979), Polish footballer
- Odjie Mamon (fl. from 2011), Filipino volleyball coach
- Rogemar Mamon (fl. from 2006), Canadian mathematician

== Other uses ==
- Mamon (TV series), Czech television series
- Mamón, traditional Filipino chiffon or sponge cakes

== See also ==
- Mammon (disambiguation)
