= Agatha Christie (disambiguation) =

Agatha Christie (1890–1976) was an English detective fiction writer and creator of fictional detectives Hercule Poirot and Miss Marple.

Agatha Christie may also refer to:

== TV ==
- Agatha Christie: A Life in Pictures, a 2004 BBC docudrama
- Agatha Christie's Great Detectives Poirot and Marple, a 2004 Japanese anime cartoon TV show
- The Agatha Christie Hour, a 1982 TV show based on the short story collection The Listerdale Mystery
- Agatha Christie's Poirot (1989–2013), based on the Hercule Poirot books, with David Suchet as Poirot
- Agatha Christie's Marple (2004–2013), based on the Miss Marple books, with Geraldine McEwan and Julia McKenzie as Miss Marple

== Video games ==
- Agatha Christie: Behind the Screen, a 1986 VCR-based interactive videogame
- Agatha Christie (video game series), a series (2005–2009) of videogame adaptations of mystery stories by Agatha Christie, created by video game developers AWE Productions and DreamCatcher Interactive:
  - Agatha Christie: And Then There Were None, a 2005 adventure game adapted from the Agatha Christie story of the same name
  - Agatha Christie: Murder on the Orient Express, 2006 adventure game adapted from the Agatha Christie story of the same name
  - Agatha Christie: Evil Under the Sun, a 2007 adventure game adapted from the Agatha Christie story of the same name
  - Agatha Christie: The ABC Murders (2009 video game), a 2009 adventure game adapted from the Agatha Christie story of the same name
- Agatha Christie: The ABC Murders (2016 video game), a 2016 adventure game adapted from the Agatha Christie story of the same name created by Artefacts Studio

== Other uses ==
- Agatha Christie: An Autobiography, a 1977 posthumous book
- Agatha Christie (band) (Russian: Агата Кристи), a Soviet rock band
- Agatha Christie Award (Japan), a Japanese literary award
- Agatha-Christie-Krimipreis (German: Agatha Christie Crime Prize), a German literary award

== See also ==
- Agatha Christie bibliography
- Adaptations of Agatha Christie
- Hercule Poirot
- Miss Marple
- Wagatha Christie, a popular name for a 2022 dispute and court case
