= Adaptations of works by Agatha Christie =

Lists of adaptations of the works of Agatha Christie. As of 2025, the only Christie novels not to have received an adaptation of any kind are Postern of Fate, Destination Unknown, Passenger to Frankfurt and Death Comes as the End.

== Film ==
| Year | Title | Story based on | Character | Country | Notes |
|---|---|---|---|---|---|
| 1928 | The Passing of Mr. Quin | The Coming of Mr Quin | Dr. Alec Portal | | First Christie film adaptation |
| 1929 | Die Abenteurer G.m.b.H. | The Secret Adversary | Names changed | Germany | First foreign Christie film adaptation; names changed from the novel. |
| 1931 | Alibi | Alibi and The Murder of Roger Ackroyd | Hercule Poirot | | First Christie film adaptation to feature Hercule Poirot; believed to be lost |
| 1931 | Black Coffee | Black Coffee | Hercule Poirot | | Believed to be lost |
| 1932 | Le Coffret de Laque | Black Coffee | Hercule Poirot | France | Adaptation of Black Coffee |
| 1934 | Lord Edgware Dies | Lord Edgware Dies | Hercule Poirot | | |
| 1937 | Love from a Stranger | Love from a Stranger and Philomel Cottage | Names changed | | Released in the US as A Night of Terror |
| 1945 | And Then There Were None | The And Then There Were None stage play and novel | Names changed | | First Christie film adaptation of And Then There Were None |
| 1947 | Love from a Stranger | Love from a Stranger and Philomel Cottage | Cecily Harrington | | Released in the UK as A Stranger Walked In |
| 1957 | Witness for the Prosecution | The Witness for the Prosecution stage play and short story | Leonard Vole | | |
| 1960 | The Spider's Web | Spider's Web | Clarissa Hailsham-Brown | | |
| 1960 | Chupi Chupi Aashey | The Mousetrap and Three Blind Mice | Names changed | India | Uncredited adaptation possibly the only notable film version of the play. |
| 1961 | Murder, She Said | 4:50 from Paddington | Miss Marple | | First Christie film adaptation to feature Miss Marple |
| 1963 | Murder at the Gallop | After the Funeral | Miss Marple | | Changed from the original novel, which features Hercule Poirot |
| 1964 | Murder Most Foul | Mrs McGinty's Dead | Miss Marple | | Changed from the original novel, which features Hercule Poirot |
| 1964 | Murder Ahoy! | None | Miss Marple | | An original film, not based on any book, although it borrows some elements of They Do It with Mirrors |
| 1965 | Ten Little Indians | The And Then There Were None stage play and novel | Names changed | | |
| 1965 | Gumnaam | And Then There Were None | Names changed | India | Uncredited adaptation |
| 1965 | The Alphabet Murders | The A.B.C. Murders | Hercule Poirot | | |
| 1970 | Nadu Iravil | And Then There Were None | Names changed | India | Uncredited adaptation in Tamil |
| 1972 | Endless Night | Endless Night | Michael Rogers | | |
| 1973 | Dhund | The Unexpected Guest | Names changed | India | Dhund (translation: Fog), produced and directed by B. R. Chopra |
| 1974 | Murder on the Orient Express | Murder on the Orient Express | Hercule Poirot | | |
| 1974 | And Then There Were None | The And Then There Were None stage play and novel | Names changed | | Released in the US as Ten Little Indians |
| 1978 | Death on the Nile | Murder on the Nile and Death on the Nile | Hercule Poirot | | |
| 1980 | The Mirror Crack'd | The Mirror Crack'd from Side to Side | Miss Marple | | |
| 1982 | Evil Under the Sun | Evil Under the Sun | Hercule Poirot | | |
| 1983 | Secret of the Blackbirds (Russian: Тайна "Чёрных дроздов") | A Pocket Full of Rye | Names changed | Soviet Union | |
| 1984 | Ordeal by Innocence | Ordeal by Innocence | Arthur Calgary | | |
| 1987 | Desyat Negrityat (= Ten Little Niggers) (Russian: Десять негритят) | The And Then There Were None stage play and novel | Lawrence Wargrave | Soviet Union | |
| 1988 | Appointment with Death | The Appointment with Death stage play and novel | Hercule Poirot | | |
| 1989 | Ten Little Indians | The And Then There Were None stage play and novel | Lawrence Wargrave | | |
| 1989 | Zagadka Endhausa (Russian: Загадка Эндхауза) | Peril at End House | Hercule Poirot | Soviet Union | |
| 1990 | Myshelovka (Russian: Мышеловка) | The Mousetrap | Sergeant Trotter | Soviet Union | |
| 1995 | Innocent Lies | Towards Zero | Names changed | | Loose adaptation of Towards Zero after scripts issue. |
| 2003 | Shubho Mahurat | The Mirror Crack'd from Side to Side | Names changed | India (Bengali) | Loosely based on Miss Marple Novel The Mirror Crack'd from Side to Side |
| 2004 | Mindhunters | n/a | Names changed | | Very loose adaptation of the stage play And Then There Were None and the novel And Then There Were None |
| 2005 | Mon petit doigt m'a dit... | By the Pricking of My Thumbs | Prudence Beresford | France | |
| 2007 | L'Heure zéro | Towards Zero | Names changed | France | |
| 2008 | Le crime est notre affaire | 4:50 from Paddington | Prudence Beresford | France | The adaptation replaces Miss Marple with Prudence Beresford. |
| 2008 | Le Grand Alibi | The Hollow | Names changed | France | Poirot does not appear in the adaptation. |
| 2011 | Aduthathu | The And Then There Were None stage play and novel | Names changed | India (Tamil) | |
| 2012 | Grandmaster | The A.B.C. Murders | Names changed | India (Malayalam) | |
| 2012 | Associés contre le crime | The Case of the Missing Lady | Prudence Beresford | France | |
| 2015 | Aatagara | The And Then There Were None stage play and novel | Names changed | India (Kannada) | |
| 2016 | Chorabali | Cards on the Table | Names changed | Bangladesh (Bengali) | |
| 2017 | Murder on the Orient Express | Murder on the Orient Express | Hercule Poirot | | |
| 2017 | Crooked House | Crooked House | Charles Hayward | | |
| 2022 | Death on the Nile | Death on the Nile | Hercule Poirot | | A sequel to 2017's Murder on the Orient Express. |
| 2023 | A Haunting in Venice | Hallowe'en Party | Hercule Poirot | | A sequel to 2022's Death on the Nile. |

== Television ==
| Run | Title | Story based on | Character | Country | Notes |
|---|---|---|---|---|---|
| 1938 | Love from a Stranger | Love from a Stranger | Bruce Lovell | UK | TV play; the original play is based on the short story Philomel Cottage |
| 1947 | Love from a Stranger | Love from a Stranger | Bruce Lovell | UK | TV play; the original play is based on the short story Philomel Cottage |
| 1949 | Ten Little Indians | And Then There Were None | Multiple | UK | |
| 1952 | They Came to Baghdad | They Came to Baghdad | Victoria Jones | US | 151st episode of Studio One |
| 1955 | Spider's Web | Spider's Web | Clarissa Hailsham-Brown | UK | |
| 1956 | Spider's Web | Spider's Web | Clarissa Hailsham-Brown | West Germany | |
| 1959 | Ten Little Indians | And Then There Were None | Multiple | UK | |
| 1980 | Why Didn't They Ask Evans? | Why Didn't They Ask Evans? | Bobby Jones & Frankie Derwent | UK | |
| 1980 | Fondoa Al Dahaia (Hotel of Victims) | The Mousetrap | Names changed | Egypt | Setting changed to Egypt |
| 1981 | The Seven Dials Mystery | The Seven Dials Mystery | Eileen 'Bundle' Brent | UK | |
| 1982 | Spider's Web | Spider's Web | Clarissa Hailsham-Brown | UK | |
| 1982 | The Agatha Christie Hour | Multiple short stories List: The Case of the Middle-Aged Wife; In a Glass Darkly; The Girl in the Train; The Fourth Man; The Case of the Discontented Soldier; Magnolia Blossom; The Mystery of the Blue Jar; The Red Signal; Jane in Search of a Job; The Manhood of Edward Robinson | Multiple | UK | |
| 1982 | Murder Is Easy | Murder is Easy | Luke Fitzwilliam | US | |
| 1982 | The Witness for the Prosecution | The Witness for the Prosecution | Wilfred Robarts QC | US | |
| 1983 | The Secret Adversary | The Secret Adversary | Tommy & Tuppence Beresford | UK | |
| 1983 | Agatha Christie's Partners in Crime | Partners in Crime List: The Secret Adversary; The Affair of the Pink Pearl; The House of Lurking Death; The Sunningdale Mystery; The Clergyman's Daughter; Finessing the King; The Ambassador's Boots; The Man in the Mist; The Unbreakable Alibi; The Case of the Missing Lady; The Crackler | Tommy & Tuppence Beresford | UK | Also adapted The Secret Adversary |
| 1983 | A Caribbean Mystery | A Caribbean Mystery | Miss Marple | US | |
| 1983 | Sparkling Cyanide | Sparkling Cyanide | Anthony Browne | US | Colonel Race omitted |
| 1984–92 | Miss Marple | Miss Marple novels List: The Murder at the Vicarage; The Body in the Library; The Moving Finger; A Murder is Announced; They Do It with Mirrors; A Pocket Full of Rye; 4:50 from Paddington; The Mirror Crack'd from Side to Side; A Caribbean Mystery; At Bertram's Hotel; Nemesis; Sleeping Murder | Miss Marple | UK | |
| 1985 | Murder with Mirrors | They Do It with Mirrors | Miss Marple | UK, US | Made-for-TV film |
| 1985 | Thirteen at Dinner | Lord Edgware Dies | Hercule Poirot | UK, US | Made-for-TV film |
| 1986 | Dead Man's Folly | Dead Man's Folly | Hercule Poirot | UK, US | Made-for-TV film |
| 1986 | Murder in Three Acts | Three Act Tragedy | Hercule Poirot | UK, US | Made-for-TV film |
| 1989 | The Man in the Brown Suit | The Man in the Brown Suit | Anne Beddingfeld | US | Made-for-TV film |
| 1989–2013 | Agatha Christie's Poirot | Poirot novels and short stories List: The Adventure of the Clapham Cook; Murder in the Mews; The Adventure of Johnnie Waverly; Four and Twenty Blackbirds; The Third Floor Flat; Triangle at Rhodes; Problem at Sea; The Incredible Theft; The King of Clubs; The Dream; Peril at End House; The Veiled Lady; The Lost Mine; The Cornish Mystery; The Disappearance of Mr. Davenheim; Double Sin; The Adventure of the Cheap Flat; The Kidnapped Prime Minister; The Adventure of the 'Western Star'; The Mysterious Affair at Styles; How Does Your Garden Grow?; The Million Dollar Bond Robbery; The Plymouth Express; Wasps' Nest; The Tragedy at Marsdon Manor; The Double Clue; The Mystery of the Spanish Chest; The Adventure of the Christmas Pudding; The Affair at the Victory Ball; The Mystery of Hunter's Lodge; The A.B.C. Murders; Death in the Clouds; One, Two, Buckle My Shoe; The Adventure of the Egyptian Tomb; The Underdog; Yellow Iris; The Case of the Missing Will; The Adventure of the Italian Nobleman; The Chocolate Box; Dead Man's Mirror; The Jewel Robbery at the Grand Metropolitan; Hercule Poirot's Christmas; Hickory Dickory Dock; The Murder on the Links; Dumb Witness; The Murder of Roger Ackroyd; Lord Edgware Dies; Evil Under the Sun; Murder in Mesopotamia; Five Little Pigs; Sad Cypress; Death on the Nile; The Hollow; The Mystery of the Blue Train; Cards on the Table; After the Funeral; Taken at the Flood; Mrs. McGinty's Dead; Cat Among the Pigeons; Third Girl; Appointment with Death; Three Act Tragedy; Hallowe'en Party; Murder on the Orient Express; The Clocks; Elephants Can Remember; The Big Four; Dead Man's Folly; The Labours of Hercules; Curtain: Poirot's Last Case | Hercule Poirot | UK | |
| 1996 | The Pale Horse | The Pale Horse | Mark Easterbrook | UK | Made-for-TV film |
| 2001 | Murder on the Orient Express | Murder on the Orient Express | Hercule Poirot | US | Made-for-TV film |
| 2003 | Sparkling Cyanide | Sparkling Cyanide | Names changed | UK | |
| 2004–5 | Agatha Christie's Great Detectives Poirot and Marple | Multiple novels List: The Jewel Robbery at the Grand Metropolitan; The Adventure of the Cheap Flat; Strange Jest; The Case of the Perfect Maid; The A.B.C. Murders; The Kidnapped Prime Minister; The Adventure of the Egyptian Tomb; The Tape-Measure Murder; Ingots of Gold; The Blue Geranium; Peril at End House; The Adventure of the Christmas Pudding; 4:50 from Paddington; The Plymouth Express; Motive v. Opportunity; The Adventure of the Clapham Cook; Sleeping Murder; Four and Twenty Blackbirds; The Disappearance of Mr. Davenheim; Death in the Clouds | Hercule Poirot and Miss Marple | Japan | Animated series, introduced Mabel West and her duck Oliver as new characters |
| 2004–13 | Agatha Christie's Marple | Several novels and short stories List: The Body in the Library; The Murder at the Vicarage; 4:50 from Paddington; A Murder Is Announced; Sleeping Murder; The Moving Finger; By the Pricking of My Thumbs; The Sittaford Mystery; Towards Zero; Nemesis; At Bertram's Hotel; Ordeal by Innocence; A Pocket Full of Rye; Murder Is Easy; They Do It with Mirrors; The Mirror Crack'd from Side to Side; The Secret of Chimneys; The Blue Geranium; Why Didn't They Ask Evans?; The Pale Horse; A Caribbean Mystery; Greenshaw's Folly; Endless Night | Miss Marple | UK | Adapted several novels and short stories that did not feature Miss Marple originally |
| 2005–7 | Agathe kann's nicht lassen | n/a | Names changed | Germany, Austria | Loosely based on Miss Marple |
| 2006–9 | Petits Meurtres en famille | Hercule Poirot's Christmas | Names changed | France | |
| 2009–present | Les Petits Meurtres d'Agatha Christie | Multiple novels List: The A.B.C. Murders; Ordeal by Innocence; The Moving Finger; Peril at End House; Cat Among the Pigeons; Sad Cypress; Five Little Pigs; Taken at the Flood; The Body in the Library; Sleeping Murder; Lord Edgware Dies; They Do It With Mirrors; Sparkling Cyanide; Dumb Witness; Why Didn't They Ask Evans?; Hallowe'en Party; Cards on the Table; Murder on the Links; Hickory Dickory Dock; Murder is Easy; A Murder is Announced; The Adventure of Johnnie Waverly; The Pale Horse; The Murder at the Vicarage; The Mysterious Affair at Styles; A Caribbean Mystery; The Man in the Brown Suit; The Mirror Crack'd from Side to Side; Third Girl; Three Act Tragedy; Hercule Poirot's Christmas; The Sittaford Mystery; Evil Under the Sun; Towards Zero; Appointment with Death; The Hollow; Endless Night | Names changed | France | The third season is not based on works by Agatha Christie |
| 2015 | Oriento kyuukou satsujin jiken | Murder on the Orient Express | Names changed | Japan | Setting changed to 1933 Japan |
| 2015 | Partners in Crime | The Secret Adversary; N or M? | Tommy & Tuppence Beresford | UK | Title taken from Partners in Crime |
| 2015 | And Then There Were None | And Then There Were None | Multiple | UK | One of the few adaptations to retain the original book's ending |
| 2016 | The Witness for the Prosecution | The Witness for the Prosecution | John Mayhew | UK | |
| 2018 | Ordeal by Innocence | Ordeal by Innocence | Arthur Calgary | UK | |
| 2018 | Kuroido Goroshi | The Murder of Roger Ackroyd | Names changed | Japan | Setting changed to Japan |
| 2018 | The ABC Murders | The A.B.C. Murders | Hercule Poirot | UK | |
| 2018 | Ms. Ma, Nemesis | Nemesis | Names changed | South Korea | Setting changed to South Korea |
| 2020 | The Pale Horse | The Pale Horse | Mark Easterbrook | UK | |
| 2021 | Shi to no Yakusoku | Appointment with Death | Names changed | Japan | Setting changed to Japan |
| 2021 | Murder in the Hills | Murder on the Orient Express | Names changed | India | Loose adaptation, setting changed to India |
| 2022 | Why Didn't They Ask Evans? | Why Didn't They Ask Evans? | Bobby Jones & Frankie Derwent | UK | |
| 2022 | Checkmate | Multiple stories List: Murder on the Orient Express; The Murder of Roger Ackroyd; Cat Among the Pigeons; One, Two, Buckle My Shoe; Five Little Pigs; The Kidnapped Prime Minister; Three Act Tragedy; Curtain: Poirot's Last Case | Names changed | China | Setting changed to 1910s and 1920s China |
| 2023 | Charlie Chopra & the Mystery of Solang Valley | The Sittaford Mystery | Names changed | India | Setting changed to India |
| 2023 | Murder is Easy | Murder Is Easy | Luke Fitzwilliam | UK | |
| 2025 | Towards Zero | Towards Zero | Inspector Leach | UK | |
| 2026 | Agatha Christie's Seven Dials | The Seven Dials Mystery | Eileen 'Bundle' Brent | UK | |
| 2026 | Agatha Christie's Tommy & Tuppence | Multiple stories List Short Stories from Partners in Crime: Finessing the King/The Gentleman Dressed in Newspaper; The Affair of the Pink Pearl; The Man in the Mist; By the Pricking of My Thumbs | Tommy and Tuppence | UK | Modern retelling. |
| 2027 | Hercule | Multiple stories | Hercule Poirot | UK | |

== BBC Radio ==
Many of Christie's novels have been adapted for BBC Radio over the course of several years. The most prominent productions were the dramatisations of the Poirot and Miss Marple stories:

=== Poirot ===
(Starring John Moffatt as Poirot, unless otherwise stated)

- The Mysterious Affair at Styles
- Murder on the Links
- The Adventure of the Christmas Pudding
- The Murder of Roger Ackroyd
- The Mystery of the Blue Train (* Maurice Denham as Poirot)
- Peril at End House
- Lord Edgware Dies (aka Thirteen at Dinner)
- Murder in Mesopotamia
- Murder on the Orient Express
- Three Act Tragedy
- Death in the Clouds
- The A.B.C. Murders
- Dumb Witness
- Cards on the Table
- Death on the Nile
- Appointment with Death
- Hercule Poirot's Christmas (* Peter Sallis as Poirot)
- One, Two, Buckle My Shoe
- Sad Cypress
- Evil Under the Sun
- Five Little Pigs
- Taken at the Flood
- Mrs McGinty's Dead
- After the Funeral
- Dead Man's Folly
- Hallowe'en Party
- Elephants Can Remember

=== Miss Marple ===
(Starring June Whitfield as Miss Marple)

- The Body in the Library
- The Murder at the Vicarage
- 4:50 from Paddington
- A Murder Is Announced
- Sleeping Murder
- The Moving Finger
- At Bertram's Hotel
- Nemesis
- A Caribbean Mystery
- They Do It With Mirrors
- The Mirror Crack'd From Side To Side
- A Pocket Full of Rye

=== Notable others ===
- Endless Night

Starring Jonathan Forbes as Mike and Lizzy Watts as Ellie

- Towards Zero

Starring Hugh Bonneville as Nevile and Marcia Warren as Lady Tresselian

- The Sittaford Mystery

Starring Melinda Walker as Emily Trefusis, Stephen Tompkinson as Charles Enderby, John Moffatt as Mr. Rycroft and Geoffrey Whitehead as Inspector Narracott

- And Then There Were None

Geoffrey Whitehead as Justice Wargrave, Lyndsey Marshal as Vera Claythorne, Alex Wyndham as Philip Lombard, John Rowe as Dr. Armstrong, and Joanna Monro as Emily Brent.

- Sparkling Cyanide

Starring Naomi Frederick as Iris and Amanda Drew as Ruth

- Ordeal by Innocence

Starring Mark Umbers as Arthur Calgary and Jacqueline Defferary as Gwenda

== Graphic novels ==
Euro Comics India began issuing a series of graphic novel adaptations of Christie's work in 2007.

| Year | Title | Story based on | Adapted by | Illustrated by | Notes |
|---|---|---|---|---|---|
| 2007 | The Murder on the Links | The Murder on the Links | François Rivière | Marc Piskic | |
| 2007 | Murder on the Orient Express | Murder on the Orient Express | François Rivière | Solidor (Jean-François Miniac). | |
| 2007 | Death on the Nile | Death on the Nile | François Rivière | Solidor (Jean-François Miniac). | |
| 2007 | The Secret of Chimneys | The Secret of Chimneys | François Rivière | Laurence Suhner | |
| 2007 | The Murder of Roger Ackroyd | The Murder of Roger Ackroyd | Bruno Lachard | | |
| 2007 | The Mystery of the Blue Train | The Mystery of the Blue Train | Marc Piskic | | |
| 2007 | The Man in the Brown Suit | The Man in the Brown Suit | Alain Paillou | | |
| 2007 | The Big Four | The Big Four | Hichot | Bairi | |
| 2007 | The Secret Adversary | The Secret Adversary | François Rivière | Frank Leclercq | |
| 2007 | The Murder at the Vicarage | The Murder at the Vicarage | Norma | | |
| 2007 | Murder in Mesopotamia | Murder in Mesopotamia | François Rivière | Chandre | |
| 2007 | And Then There Were None | And Then There Were None | François Rivière | Frank Leclercq | |
| 2007 | Endless Night | Endless Night | François Rivière | Frank Leclercq | |
| 2008 | Ordeal by Innocence | Ordeal by Innocence | Chandre | | |
| 2008 | Hallowe'en Party | Hallowe'en Party | Chandre | | |
| 2008 | Peril at End House | Peril at End House | Thierry Jollet | Didier Quella-Guyot | |
| 2009 | Dumb Witness | Dumb Witness | Marek | | |
| 2010 | Cards on the Table | Cards on the Table | Frank Leclercq | | |
| 2010 | Five Little Pigs | Five Little Pigs | Miceal O'Griafa | David Charrier | |
| 2012 | Dead Man's Folly | Dead Man's Folly | Marek | | |
| 2013 | Evil Under the Sun | Evil Under the Sun | Thierry Jollet | Didier Quella-Guyot | |

== Video games ==
| Year | Title | Story based on | Console | Country | Notes |
|---|---|---|---|---|---|
| 1988 | The Scoop | The Scoop and Behind the Screen | PC | US | |
| 2005 | Agatha Christie: And Then There Were None | And Then There Were None | PC and Wii | US | |
| 2006 | Agatha Christie: Murder on the Orient Express | Murder on the Orient Express | PC | US | |
| 2007 | Agatha Christie: Death on the Nile | Death on the Nile | PC | US | I-Spy hidden-object game |
| 2007 | Agatha Christie: Evil Under the Sun | Evil Under the Sun | PC and Wii | US | |
| 2008 | Agatha Christie: Peril at End House | Peril at End House | | US | I-Spy hidden-object game |
| 2009 | Agatha Christie: The ABC Murders | The A.B.C. Murders | DS | US | |
| 2009 | Agatha Christie: Dead Man's Folly | Dead Man's Folly | PC | US | I-Spy hidden-object game |
| 2010 | Agatha Christie 4:50 from Paddington | 4:50 from Paddington | PC | US | I-Spy hidden-object game |
| 2016 | Agatha Christie: The ABC Murders | The A.B.C. Murders | PC, Nintendo Switch, PlayStation 4 and Xbox One | France | |
| 2021 | Agatha Christie – Hercule Poirot: The First Cases | Poirot's Early Cases | PC, Nintendo Switch, PlayStation 4 and Xbox One | US | |
| 2023 | Agatha Christie – Hercule Poirot: The London Case | | PC, Nintendo Switch, PlayStation 4, PlayStation 5, Xbox One and Xbox Series X/S | US | |
| 2023 | Agatha Christie – Murder on the Orient Express | Murder on the Orient Express | PC, Nintendo Switch, PlayStation 4, PlayStation 5, Xbox One and Xbox Series X/S | US | |
