= ABC Murders (disambiguation) =

The A.B.C. Murders, is a 1936 novel by Agatha Christie.

ABC Murders may also refer to:

== Crime ==
- ABC Murders, a series of murders in the 1990s in South Africa committed by serial killer Moses Sithole

== Television ==
- The ABC Murders (TV series), a 2018 TV series based on the 1936 novel by Agatha Christie
- "The ABC Murders", a 1992 episode of the TV show Agatha Christie's Poirot; see List of Agatha Christie's Poirot episodes
- "The ABC Murders", a 2004 multipart episode in the TV show Agatha Christie's Great Detectives Poirot and Marple
- "The ABC Murders" (French: Les meurtres ABC), a 2009 TV episode of Les Petits Meurtres d'Agatha Christie

== Videogames ==
- Agatha Christie: The ABC Murders (2009 video game), a 2009 videogame based on the 1936 novel by Agatha Christie
- Agatha Christie: The ABC Murders (2016 video game), a 2016 videogame based on the 1936 novel by Agatha Christie

== Other ==
- The ABC Murders (Japanese: ABC殺人事件, romanized: ABC Satsujin Jiken), a manga by Yasushi Hoshino; an adaptation of The A.B.C. Murders by Agatha Christie
- "The ABC Murders", a 2000 episode of the radio series Hercule Poirot (radio series)

== See also ==
- Alphabet Murders (disambiguation)
- The Alphabet Killer (film), a 2008 US horror film based on the 1970s New York alphabet murders
- The ABCs of Death, an experimental comedy horror anthology film produced by international producers and directed by filmmakers from around the world.
