= Agatha Christie (video game series) =

- Genres: Adventure; Hidden object game
- Developers: AWE Productions; DreamCatcher Interactive; Blazing Griffin; Floodlight Games; Oberon Games; Black Lantern Studios; Microids
- Publishers: The Adventure Company; DreamCatcher Interactive; Hullabu; Tri Synergy; Microids
- Platforms: Windows; Wii; Nintendo DS; PlayStation 4 Xbox One; Xbox Series; Nintendo Switch iOS; Android; PlayStation 5
- First release: Agatha Christie: And Then There Were None; September 30, 2005
- Latest release: Agatha Christie - Death on the Nile; September 25, 2025

The Agatha Christie series is a series of adventure games developed by AWE Games and published by The Adventure Company and DreamCatcher Interactive, based on the works of the English mystery writer Agatha Christie.

== Profile ==
The first three games were developed by American developer AWE Productions and published between 2005 and 2007 by The Adventure Company, a division of DreamCatcher Interactive. In 2006 Dreamcatcher Interactive and its intellectual property was bought by Austrian publishing company JoWooD Entertainment. Since the acquisition, DreamCatcher has continued to launch titles both under The Adventure Company and DreamCatcher labels including the fourth game in the Agatha Christie series (which was co-developed by AWE Productions and Black Lantern Studios for the Nintendo DS handheld console and was published by Dreamcatcher).

Four hidden object games were developed by Floodlight Games and published by Oberon Games between 2006 and 2010.

In 2011, both DreamCatcher Interactive, and its parent company, JoWood Entertainment went into administration and their assets were absorbed into Nordic Games (which was later re-branded as THQ Nordic). The company did not acquire the rights to Agatha Christie games in the process.

In August 2013 the French video game publisher and distributor Anuman Interactive announced that its adventure label Microïds had purchased the rights to use Agatha Christie novels. The game, titled Agatha Christie: The ABC Murders was developed by Lyon-based Artefacts Studio and published in February 2016.

In September 2021 Anuman Interactive released a prequel, titled Agatha Christie: Hercule Poirot - The First Cases, developed by Blazing Griffin.

In 2023, Agatha Christie - Hercule Poirot: The London Case was developed by Blazing Griffin Limited and published by Microids SA. The game is available on PC, PlayStation 4, PlayStation 5, Xbox One, Xbox Series X/S, and Nintendo Switch.

The following games in the series have been released:

Release	Title	PC	Console	Handheld / Mobile	Developer	Publisher	Work Based On	Metacritic Score	Ref
2005	Agatha Christie: And Then There Were None	Windows	Wii	—N/a	AWE Productions	The Adventure Company	And Then There Were None (1939)	68	
2006	Agatha Christie: Murder on the Orient Express	Windows	—N/a	—N/a	AWE Productions	The Adventure Company	Murder on the Orient Express (1934)	60	
2007	Agatha Christie: Evil Under the Sun	Windows	Wii	—N/a	AWE Productions	The Adventure Company	Evil Under the Sun (1941)	66	
2007	Agatha Christie: Peril at End House	Windows macOS	—N/a	—N/a	Floodlight Games; Oberon Games; Red Marble Games (macOS)	I-play; Tri Synergy (re-release); Microids (re-release)	Peril at End House (1932)	N/A	
2008	Agatha Christie: Death on the Nile	Windows macOS	—N/a	—N/a	Floodlight Games; Oberon Games; Red Marble Games (macOS)	The Adventure Company; I-play; Tri Synergy (re-release); Microids (re-release)	Death on the Nile (1937)	49	
2009	Agatha Christie: Dead Man's Folly	Windows	—N/a	iOS	Floodlight Games; Oberon Games; Hullabu (mobile version)	The Adventure Company; I-play; Tri Synergy (re-release); Microids (re-release); Hullabu (mobile re-release)	Dead Man's Folly (1956)	N/A	
2009	Agatha Christie: The ABC Murders	—N/a	—N/a	Nintendo DS	Black Lantern Studios	The Adventure Company	The A.B.C. Murders (1936)	53	
2010	Agatha Christie: 4:50 from Paddington	Windows	—N/a	Android iOS	Floodlight Games; Oberon Games; Hullabu (mobile version)	I-play; Tri Synergy (re-release); Microids (re-release); Hullabu (mobile re-release)	4:50 from Paddington (1957)	N/A	
2016	Agatha Christie: The ABC Murders	Windows; Linux macOS	PlayStation 4 Xbox One	Nintendo Switch; Android iOS	Artefacts Studio	Microids	The A.B.C. Murders (1936)	69	
2021	Agatha Christie: Hercule Poirot - The First Cases	Windows macOS	PlayStation 4 Xbox One; Xbox Series	Nintendo Switch	Blazing Griffin	Microids		75	
2023	Agatha Christie: Hercule Poirot - The London Case	Windows	PlayStation 4 PlayStation 5 Xbox One; Xbox Series	Nintendo Switch	Blazing Griffin	Microids		65	
2023	Agatha Christie - Murder on the Orient Express	Windows	PlayStation 4 PlayStation 5 Xbox One; Xbox Series	Nintendo Switch	Microids	Microids	Murder on the Orient Express (1934)	75	
2025	Agatha Christie - Death on the Nile	Windows	PlayStation 5 Xbox Series	Nintendo Switch	Microids	Microids	Death on the Nile (1937)	TBD	
