= Lee Sheldon (writer) =

American writer and game designer

- Education: Boston University (BFA); California Institute of the Arts (MFA)
- Occupations: Game writer/designer, author, TV producer, scriptwriter
- Writing career
- Years active: 1970s–present
- Genre: High tech
- Notable works: The Multiplayer Classroom: Designing Coursework as a Game; Character Development and Storytelling for Games; Impossible Bliss

Charles Lee Sheldon is an American academic, game writer and designer, book author, television producer and scriptwriter, often in the mystery genre, and is best known for creating game teaching projects.

== Education ==
Sheldon has a bachelor of fine arts degree in stage directing from Boston University, and an MFA in film direction from California Institute of the Arts. During his time as a student at CalArts, he was mentored under Alexander Mackendrick. In addition, he had two pairs of mentors while he was a writer and producer in television — Ron Austin and Jim Buchanan, as well as William Link and Richard Levinson.

== Career ==
His television credits as a scriptwriter include Charlie's Angels, Quincy, M.E., Cagney & Lacey, The Edge of Night (head writer), Snoops, Another World, and Star Trek: The Next Generation. He was nominated for two Edgar Awards from the Mystery Writers of America and a Writers Guild of America award.

As the new head writer of The Edge of Night on May 23, 1983, he increased the pace of the soap opera, with shorter timelines for crime mystery plots and more storylines within the half-hour show. He promoted the use of computers to accelerate the writing and development process.

Sheldon said he was brought on as a producer in 1990 to the fourth season Star Trek: The Next Generation to add more mystery and action to the fourth season. He wrote the episode, "Remember Me", which featured the character Beverly Crusher trying to solve the mystery of disappearing crew members that others don't remember. He recommended a former co-worker, Jeri Taylor, to join the series.

In 1995, Sheldon supplied the voice of Monk 13 in the video game Ripley's Believe It or Not!: The Riddle of Master Lu. He also wrote the scripts for the gameplay, casting, and voice acting direction.

He is the author of a mystery novel, Impossible Bliss, and two non-fiction books, The Multiplayer Classroom: Designing Coursework as a Game (CRC Press, 2009) and Character Development and Storytelling for Games (Course Technology, 2nd ed., 2013).

Sheldon was lead writer on several video game projects, including Disney Fantasia: Music Evolved (Harmonix, 2014), Adventure World (Zynga), and Star Trek: Infinite Space (Gameforge). He also worked as writer and designer of The Adventure Company's Agatha Christie video game series which includes And Then There Were None, Murder on the Orient Express and Evil Under the Sun).

In 2006, Sheldon became an assistant professor in the Department of Telecommunications at Indiana University until 2010. For a couple of his game design classes, he used the structure of role-playing games for teaching with experience points to decide grades. One of his projects, Londontown, is a virtual world that emphasizes storytelling.

He previously taught as an associate professor in the communication and media department and as co-director of the Games and Simulation Arts and Sciences program at the Rensselaer Polytechnic Institute in Troy, New York.

He is a professor of practice in game writing in the Interactive Media & Game Development Program at Worcester Polytechnic Institute in Worcester, Massachusetts, starting in 2014.

In February 2020, Sheldon wrote an episode of Extra Credits on developing non-player characters (NPC) with narrative depth. He now holds a recurring position on the company's writing staff.
