= ABC Rail Guide =

UK railway timetable guide

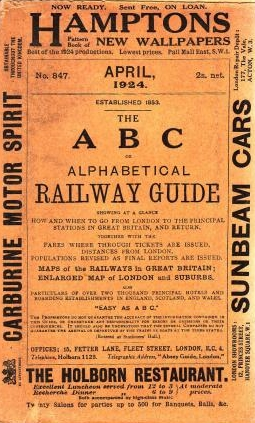
- The ABC Alphabetical Railway Guide, No. 847, April 1924
- Categories: Travel
- Frequency: Monthly
- Founded: 1853
- Final issue: 2007
- Country: United Kingdom
- Language: English

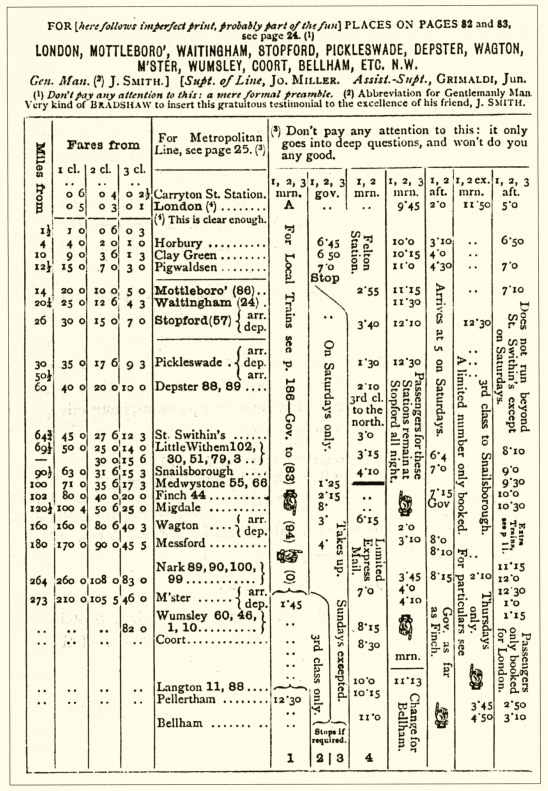
Mock railway timetable from Punch magazine, 1865, satirising the complexity of ABC's competitor Bradshaw.

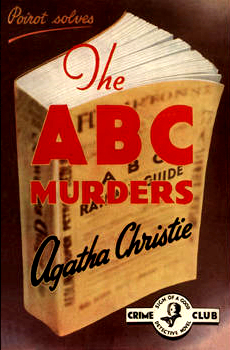
Cover of first edition of Agatha Christie's The A.B.C. Murders, 1936.

The ABC Rail Guide, first published in 1853 as The ABC or Alphabetical Railway Guide, was a monthly railway timetable guide to the United Kingdom that was organised on an alphabetical basis that made it easier to use than its competitor Bradshaw's Guide which had a reputation for difficulty.

It was one of many railway timetable guides published during the expansion of the British railway network in the Victorian era, had many imitators, and was seen as symbolic of the more regulated nature of life in the industrial era.

In 1936, the guides were a plot element in Agatha Christie's detective novel The A.B.C. Murders. After a number of changes of publisher in the later twentieth century during which it was renamed the OAG Rail Guide, it ceased publication in 2007.

== Victorian origins ==
The guide was first published in 1853 by William Tweedie of 337 Strand, London, under the title The ABC or Alphabetical Railway Guide. It had the subtitle: How and when you can go from London to the different stations in Great Britain, and return; together with the fares, distances, population, and the cab fares from the different stations. Also a new map of the railways, telegraphs &c., of Great Britain.

The guide's slogan was "Easy as ABC", reflecting its alphabetical listings that made it much easier to use than its competitor Bradshaw's Guide which was notoriously difficult to understand, requiring "the patience of a chess player and the ingenuity of a crossword puzzle addict". Oscar Wilde is said to have observed that he would "sooner lose a train by the ABC than catch it by Bradshaw".

The disadvantage of the ABC guide, however, was that it only allowed the reader to see the timetable information when travelling from one principal station to another while Bradshaw's tabular form allowed every passenger service and every station, even the minor ones, to be shown.

It was one of many similar railway timetable guides published during the Victorian era during the expansion of the railway network in what has been called "the age of timetables", the production of which was seen at the time as symbolic of the more regulated nature of life in the industrial era, and "a necessity in these days of constant locomotion" as a clergyman put it in 1885. The scope of the guide was national but contemporary commentators noted that every large city seemed to have its own version of the ABC guide.

== Agatha Christie novel ==
In Agatha Christie's detective novel of 1936 featuring Hercule Poirot, The A.B.C. Murders, an "ABC railway guide" is left at the scene of each of a series of murders of which Alexander Bonaparte Cust is suspected. A copy of the guide was pictured on the cover. Christie's grandson, Mathew Prichard, stated in an interview that the story was inspired by a copy of the ABC guide that she always kept by her telephone. In the novel, after the first murder, a copy of a railway guide is found, open at Andover. Poirot asks the police inspector, "A railway guide, you say. A Bradshaw – or an A B C?" to which the inspector replies "By the Lord, it was an A B C". Poirot subsequently attributes his interest in the case to the involvement of the railway guide, "so familiarly known by its abbreviation of A B C".

In the 1960s, the guide again featured on the cover of Christie's The A.B.C. Murders after the August 1935 edition was chosen as the background image and frame for a scene from the novel in one of Tom Adams' illustrations for the Fontana paperback edition.

== Twentieth century ==
A section on air travel was introduced and the guide briefly had the title ABC or Alphabetical Railway and Air Guide (March 1945 to May 1946) before that section was spun-off and published separately as The ABC or Alphabetical Air Guide.

In 1986, the July 1923 edition was reprinted by David & Charles with an introduction by David St John Thomas in which he observed that fans of Bradshaw's were inclined to regard users of the ABC as lazy as it gave only the times to and from London and ignored cross-country trains. He felt, however, that it did greatly stimulate the mind of the railway historian, the July 1923 edition being particularly interesting as it was one of the first published after the January 1923 railway company consolidation into the "big four" companies.

In the twentieth century, its publishers were Thomas Skinner & Co., who also published the Stock Exchange Official Year-Book and the Directory of Directors, ABC Travel Guides of Dunstable, Reed, and OAG (founded as the Official Aviation Guide). The guide was retitled the OAG Rail Guide in 1996. It ceased to be published in 2007.

== See also ==
- History of rail transport in Great Britain
