= Outerlight =

British video game developer

Outerlight Limited
- Company type: Private
- Industry: Video games
- Founded: 10 March 2003; 23 years ago
- Founders: Chris Peck; Ailsa Bates; Ed Wilson
- Defunct: 2010
- Fate: Dissolved
- Headquarters: Edinburgh, Scotland
- Key people: Chris Peck (managing director)
- Products: The Ship: Murder Party; Bloody Good Time
- Number of employees: ▼1 (2010)

Outerlight Limited was a British video game developer based in Edinburgh. The company was incorporated by Christopher "Chris" Peck, Ailsa Jeannette Bates and Edward "Ed" Wilson, at the United Kingdom's Companies House, on 10 March 2003.

== History ==
The company's first game was The Ship, a mod for Half-Life, released for free in 2004. The game was reworked as a standalone title, under the name The Ship: Murder Party, and released commercially, independently via Steam, in July 2006. Peck described the time of The Ship's development as "a costly and soul destroying two years chasing publishing deals and failing". Retail versions of the game were distributed by Merscom and Mindscape in North America and Europe, respectively.

A sequel to the game, The Ship 2, was announced to be in development in September 2007. The game was briefly known as Hollywood Murder Party, and was announced as Bloody Good Time, published by Ubisoft, in September 2010. Shortly prior to the game's October 2010 release, Peck announced that all of Outerlight's staff, except for him, had been laid off, and the offices vacated. Peck remained with the company as managing director and kept it trading using ongoing sales from The Ship: Murder Party, hoping that the upcoming income from Bloody Good Time would help re-establish the company. Although no further news came from Outerlight, with the website having shut down, the studio is believed to have closed completely sometime in 2010.

The Ship's intellectual property was acquired by Blazing Griffin in November 2011. Using the license, Blazing Griffin attempted to finance a sequel to the game, The Ship: Full Steam Ahead, through a Kickstarter campaign starting in October 2012, and seeking £128,000. However, project funding was cancelled in January 2013, after Blazing Griffin saw major communication problems with the Kickstarter community. In place of the sequel, Blazing Griffin instead announced in June 2015 that they were developing a remastered version of the original The Ship: Murder Party game, titled The Ship: HD, although this was later changed to The Ship: Remasted. The game was released into Steam Early Access in February 2016, which it exited in October 2016.

== Games developed ==
Year	Title	Platform(s)	Publisher(s)
2006	The Ship: Murder Party	Microsoft Windows	Outerlight, Merscom, Mindscape
2010	Bloody Good Time	Microsoft Windows, Xbox 360	Ubisoft
