= Alphabet Murders (disambiguation) =

Alphabet murders are a 1970s series of child murders in the surroundings of Rochester, New York (United States).

Alphabet murders may also refer to:

== Crime ==
- California alphabet murders, a series of late-20th-century murder-rapes in California committed by Joseph Naso

== Other uses ==
- The Alphabet Murders (poem), a 1976 poem by John Tranter
- The Alphabet Murders (film), a 1965 UK film based on the Agatha Christie story The ABC Murders

== See also ==
- ABC Murders (disambiguation)
- The Alphabet Killer (film), a 2008 US horror film based on the 1970s New York alphabet murders
