= Kevin Delaney =

American voice actor

- Born: Pittsburgh, Pennsylvania, U.S.
- Occupation: Voice actor
- Years active: 1995–present
- Website: voninja.com

Kevin Delaney is an American voice actor, who is best known for voicing Edna Mode in Disney Infinity, Captain Marvel in Mortal Kombat vs. DC Universe and Ryuji Keikain in Nura: Rise of the Yokai Clan: Demon Capital. He also provided additional voices for Looney Tunes: Stranger Than Fiction, Looney Tunes: Reality Check, and Lightning Returns: Final Fantasy XIII.

== Filmography ==
=== Anime ===
- Nura: Rise of the Yokai Clan - Demon Capital - Ryuji Keikain (2013)

=== Video games ===
- Agatha Christie: Evil Under the Sun - Hercule Poirot
- Anvil of Dawn - Court Magician, Book Thing, Second in Command
- Chronomaster - Fortune Teller
- Disney's Chicken Little: Ace in Action - Space Goosey Lucy
- Disney Infinity - Edna Mode
- Dracula: Origin - Abraham Van Helsing, Dracula
- Earth Defense Force 2025 - Soldier
- Experience112 - Mike Loyd
- Galactic Bowling - Sasquatch
- Kingdom Hearts II - Tournament Announcer
- Lightning Returns: Final Fantasy XIII - Additional Voices
- Math Blaster: Master the Basics - Cyclotron X, Tribal Leader, Announcer
- The Matrix: Path of Neo - Theater Heckler, SWAT, Army Soldier
- Mortal Kombat vs. DC Universe - Captain Marvel
- Sanitarium - Scotty Havel, Hector Vasquez, Frank Rizzo, Ometoch, Priest, Newscaster
- Tarr Chronicles - Captain Eric Heriot
- Watchmen: The End Is Nigh - Mercenary
- World of Warcraft: Wrath of the Lich King - Varos Cloudstrider, Skarvald the Constructor, Slad'ran, XT-002 Deconstructor

=== Other ===
- Search For the Lost Giants - Narrator
- Looney Tunes - Various

=== Movies ===
- 50 Ways to Leave Your Lover - Daniel
- Sister Sarah's Sky - Pool Boy
- Soar into the Sun - Major Lee

=== Shorts ===
- The Landing - Radio Presenter

=== Live shows ===
- Disney on Ice - Edna Mode (Disneyland Adventure)
