= Bloody Good Time =

2010 video game

- Bloody Good Time cover
- Developer: Outerlight
- Publisher: Ubisoft
- Engine: Source
- Platforms: Windows, Xbox 360
- Release: 27 October 2010
- Genre: First-person shooter
- Modes: Single-player, multiplayer

Bloody Good Time is a first-person shooter developed by Outerlight and published by Ubisoft for Microsoft Windows and Xbox 360. It was released in October 2010.

== Overview ==
The game is a spiritual sequel to The Ship, Outerlight's debut title, with similar but improved gameplay and graphics. It features four various game modes (hunt, elimination, revenge and deathmatch). Up to eight players can play in online matches. There is also an arcade mode which allows the player to fight against the AI bots. The title uses Valve's Source engine.

The game takes place on a Hollywood movie set and it features three different maps: beach, casino and horror house. Players can choose one of the eight available B-movie characters (The Surfer, The Beach babe, The Goth, The Bunny girl, The Showgirl, The Clown, The Gambler and The Stoner) and then kill other players with 21 different weapons, including usual guns and various items, such as frying pan or remote-controlled rats. The reception has been indifferent, with very weak sales, which was attributed to Outerlight's demise.

== Reception ==
Reception

Aggregate score
Aggregator	Score	
Aggregator	PC	Xbox 360
Metacritic	73/100	55/100

Review scores
Publication	Score	
Publication	PC	Xbox 360
Edge	N/A	5/10
Eurogamer	N/A	6/10
Gamekult	5/10	N/A
GamesMaster	N/A	40%
GameSpot	N/A	6.5/10
GameZone	N/A	5/10
Jeuxvideo.com	10/20	N/A
Official Xbox Magazine (US)	N/A	5.5/10
PALGN	N/A	3.5/10
PC Gamer (US)	88%	N/A

The game received "mixed or average reviews" on both platforms according to the review aggregation website Metacritic.
