= SOL: Exodus =

2012 video game

- Developer: Seamless Entertainment
- Publishers: Seamless Entertainment; Headup Games (Germany)
- Designers: Chris Stockman, Dan Magaha, Ben Rosendahl
- Engine: Unreal Engine 3
- Platform: PC
- Release: January 25, 2012
- Genre: Space combat simulator
- Mode: Single player

SOL: Exodus is the first episode in a series of space combat simulator games by Bit Plantes Games (formerly Seamless Entertainment), an independent game developer located in Austin, Texas, released on January 25, 2012. Two episodes, The Battle of Sol and The Fleets of Sol were released in 2015.

== Gameplay ==
The game is set in the Solar System, and features both dogfighting and battles with capital ships. The game is described by the designers as being in the spirit of older space combat simulators such as Wing Commander, FreeSpace, Descent and Star Wars: X-Wing.

== Reception ==
Reception

Aggregate score
Aggregator	Score
Metacritic	57/100

Review scores
Publication	Score
Destructoid	8/10
IGN	5.5/10

Aggregate review site Metacritic scores SOL: Exodus 57/100, indicating "mixed or average reviews".
