= Agatha Christie: And Then There Were None =

2005 video game

- Developer: AWE Productions
- Publisher: The Adventure Company
- Designer: Lee Sheldon
- Series: Agatha Christie
- Platforms: Windows, Wii
- Release: Windows: NA: October 27, 2005; UK: February 10, 2006; Wii: EU: February 8, 2008; NA: February 25, 2008; AU: April 24, 2008
- Genre: Adventure
- Mode: Single-player

Agatha Christie: And Then There Were None (With 16 Chapters) (also known simply as And Then There Were None) is a 2005 point-and-click adventure game developed by AWE Productions and published by The Adventure Company for Microsoft Windows. It was the first in The Adventure Company's Agatha Christie series. The game is a detective murder-mystery; it begins with nine people, including Patrick Narracott, the playable character, who meet and journey to the fictional Shipwreck (Soldier) Island. There, two additional onscreen characters are introduced, and the story then follows the events that unfold.

And Then There Were None retains most of the basic plot elements of Agatha Christie's 1939 novel of the same name; the major differences are the inclusion of the playable character, Patrick Narracott, and the creation of a range of possible endings. To further the connection between the game and its source material, Christie's novel was included in the North American PC release of the game. Agatha Christie: And Then There Were None was followed by two more games, Agatha Christie: Murder on the Orient Express and Agatha Christie: Evil Under the Sun. Since they were based on their respective novels, their plots were unrelated to this first game.

Reactions to the game were mixed, with many reviewers polarized in their opinions: some calling it a good adaptation of the novel; others, an extremely poor adventure game. Several reviews harshly criticized the game's character design and graphics as being archaic and outdated, whereas others praised aspects such as character dialogue and a captivating story.

== Gameplay ==
And Then There Were None is a point-and-click adventure game, played from a third-person perspective. Most of the interactive elements of And Then There Were None consist of asking other characters questions, and collecting and combining items. The player can carry items using an inventory system, consisting of screens which can show up to twelve items. New items go into the first available slot, and these items can be combined or examined throughout the game. The game's cursor is context-sensitive, and changes into a rotating gear when held over an item the player can interact with and use. And Then There Were None features a 2.5D graphics engine, which combines pre-rendered backgrounds with 3D-modelled characters.

The inventory can contain multiple items.

And Then There Were None is divided into 10 chapters. After completing a certain trigger event, the next chapter begins. The developers ensured that nothing essential to the game could be missed during the player's progression, although large sections of gameplay are optional, and the player may ignore many of the side-quests. This divided progression adds another dimension to gameplay, as not only does the player have to be in the right place to find a clue or solve a puzzle, but must be there at the right time. For example, an empty room in one act could hold a vital clue in the next.

And Then There Were None features a journal system to aid in the collection and piecing together of clues. The in-game journal records everything that the player needs to advance in the game, in order to prevent the player wandering aimlessly, unable to proceed. For example, the journal records conversations the player has with other characters, so that if they forget what was said, it will still be accessible. The developers also created the journal so that players did not have to use external resources, such as pen and paper. The journal is separated by content into several categories, such as a characters page, which lists all the characters by name and includes details about them, as well as separate pages for important items, documents and books. This information can be referenced at any time by the player.

Another feature of And Then There Were None is the "Suspicion Meter", which measures the player's relationship with other characters, starting from a neutral position at the start of the game. There are negative consequences if the player is caught doing things that other characters deem inappropriate, which directly affects the "Suspicion Meter": falling one point for every negative action and raising one point for each positive act. Depending on which of three positions the meter is in regarding a particular character, dialogue actions with that character are affected. The player is also able to regain approval points by solving "Suspicion Meter" puzzles; multiple inventory items and combining items and can be quite complicated.

After completing the game, the player is given one final puzzle. Completing it shows the original ending of the novel.

== Synopsis ==
=== Setting and characters ===
And Then There Were None is set in 1939, taking place at "a beautiful mansion on the deserted Soldier Island." A quote by one of the characters, Emily Brent, in the first chapter sets the month as August ("This same week of August 4 years ago.") The player can explore the two-storey Art Deco-style mansion, which includes a secret room behind a bookcase in the library. The exterior of Soldier Island, including a beach, a forest, and an apiary, may also be explored.

The player character is Patrick Narracott. Patrick is the only character not mentioned in Christie's original novel, although his brother — Fred Narracott — is the one who ferries the guests to the island in the original book. The other characters are the guests: Judge Lawrence John Wargrave; Vera Elizabeth Claythorne; Philip Lombard; General John Gordon MacKenzie; Emily Caroline Brent; Anthony James Marston; William Henry Blore; the butler, Thomas Gregg Rogers; and his wife, Ethel Maria Rogers.

=== Plot ===
The events of the book, with the exception of the killer's identity and the player character, are closely retained in the game. The game begins with eight of the characters (all but the two servants) arriving at the fictional seaside town of Sticklehaven, where they are to be ferried to Shipwreck Island by Patrick Narracott (who is substituting for his brother who is "under the weather"). When they arrive on the island, the other two characters are introduced, but when Patrick returns to his boat he finds it sabotaged, forcing him to stay on the island. Later, Blore confesses to Patrick that he is the one who damaged the boat, believing Patrick to be his brother Fred, who he thought was a thief. At dinner that night, the guests discover that none of them have met, or are familiar with, "U.N. Owen", the enigmatic host who invited most of them to the party.

After dinner, a gramophone record accuses the ten non-player characters of getting away with murder. Moments later, Anthony Marston dies after drinking a poisoned cocktail. That night, Ethel Rogers dies of a drug overdose in her sleep. The deaths are initially thought to be suicides or accidents until, after the death of General MacArthur, Judge Wargrave determines that they are actually murders and that the host, U.N. Owen, is most likely the killer. Wargrave further speculates that Owen must be one of the remaining 8, and is following the pattern of the nursery rhyme over the fireplace, "Ten Little Sailor Boys". After each murder, one of the ten figurines in the dining room goes missing. Narracott is now established as the detective of the group since his presence on the island was not expected by the killer. It is also discovered that Lombard has brought a revolver to the island.

After the deaths of Thomas Rogers by axe and Emily Brent from anaphylactic shock from multiple bee stings, Lombard announces that his revolver has been stolen, and a search for it is fruitless. Narracott discovers he has been poisoned with the fictional drug Solidamide, but he obtains a remedy: a bottle of the fictional "Bellman's Universal Application", found near the site of Miss Brent's death. During a blackout after dinner that night, Wargrave is killed by a shot to the head. Later in the night, however, Wargrave's body goes missing along with Armstrong, whose drowned body washes up on the shore. Wargrave's body turns up later in the screening room, but looks to have been bludgeoned to death, rather than shot. Blore is also found to have been killed, his head caved in by a marble clock.

Narracott returns to the house to find that the killer is Emily Brent, who is really the famous actress Gabrielle Steele, a previous owner of the island who has been mentioned several times. Steele wanted Wargrave killed because he sentenced her love, Edward Seton, to death. She would torture him first by killing those around him first, all criminals who had gotten away with their crimes, and explains how she had faked her own death earlier, using an overdose of the Bellman's Universal Application found earlier to simulate a fatal allergic reaction to the bee stings.

There are four different endings depending on whether Vera and Phillip – one, both, or neither – are saved. If Phillip is saved, he will reveal that his name is actually Charles Morley, a friend of Lombard's who assumed his identity when the real Phillip Lombard committed suicide out of guilt for his past crime. If Vera is saved, she and Narracott return to Sticklehaven (with Morley, if he also survives), where Vera explains her innocence of the crime the gramophone accused her of. If either Vera or Morley (or both) are saved, their statements to the police will clear Narracott and his brother. If neither of them survive, the Naracott brothers make their escape from the police. If Vera survives, she and Naracott decide to get married.

Following the game's completion, the player is given one last challenge that will reward them with the original ending to the book, where Wargrave is the killer. Dying, he wants to mete out justice personally to criminals who have escaped punishment, whom he has invited to the island. The alternate ending details the events of the book, And Then There Were None, wherein all the guests on the island are killed by Wargrave except for the last two, Vera and Lombard. Vera then shoots Lombard, thinking him the murderer (since Wargrave has faked his own death), and then hangs herself. Wargrave then shoots himself.

== Development ==
And Then There Were None was announced on February 3, 2005, as the first in a series of games based on novels by Agatha Christie. For the release, The Adventure Company collaborated with developer AWE Productions. Lee Sheldon was named Lead Designer and writer for the game, while Scott Nixon, from AWE, was appointed managing director. The Adventure Company chose the novel And Then There Were None as the first game, instead of other Christie novels involving famous detectives Hercule Poirot and Miss Marple, for several reasons. Among them was the popularity of the novel, which would help with marketing; and the island nature of the story which would provide a natural barrier, while allowing more freedom of movement for the players within that confined area.

One major obstacle in the development of And Then There Were None was gaining the approval of aspects of the game from Chorion, the company which owned the rights to Agatha Christie's works. The development team met with Mathew Prichard, Christie's grandson, and other members of Chorion. While protective of Christie's license, Chorion was quite open about changes to the plot, as long as they were within the style of Christie's novels. These included a change to the identity of the killer, the addition of a player character, and changes to the figurines at the table – renaming them "sailor boys", to fit in with the boat motif of being moored on the island. Chorion did not accept all the changes proposed by the developers, for example rejecting the idea of a one-man submarine the player could operate as not being in the style of Christie's work. The survival of Vera and Lombard, and the change of the General's name from MacArthur to MacKenzie, were both used by Christie herself in a 1943 stage adaptation of the novel. Patrick Narracott as the eleventh character was a major plot change, and was done to explore a semi-romance between him and Vera Claythorne, as well as the developers' desire to have players connect to a more human character, rather than a nameless one.

The main concern designer Lee Sheldon had was the emphasis placed on story and dialogue. He had considered the idea that the killer could change every time a player played the game; this idea of open-ended, modular gameplay was quickly discarded, as Sheldon thought it didn't pay homage to Christie's work. The orders of the murders forced Sheldon down a linear path, and the numerous cut scenes, cinematics and long dialogues were needed because the novel is composed largely of dialogue. Sheldon strived to make the puzzles a seamless part of the game's environment and plot, and not simply tacked on for the sake of a puzzle.

The designers of And Then There Were None decided to leave the game in its original time period, the 1930s. Sheldon was firmly against updating the game to a modern time period, calling this "a futile attempt to attract an audience that really doesn't care anyway." One of the main attractions to the past for Sheldon was the ability to explore its culture and mores. The mansion in the game was researched using architecture and Art Deco books as references. Christie described the mansion in the novel as stark and modern, and this made Sheldon turn to the work of famous architect Frank Lloyd Wright, and in particular his house Fallingwater.

And Then There Were None was shipped to North American stores on October 27, 2005. The Adventure Company announced on March 19, 2007, that the game would be ported to the Wii console, which would feature an ability to spin the Wii Remote to turn safe handles, and the ability to unearth clues by imitating a digging action.

== Reception ==
Reception

Aggregate scores
Aggregator	Score	
Aggregator	PC	Wii
GameRankings	65.36%	54.96%
Metacritic	68/100	50/100

Review scores
Publication	Score	
Publication	PC	Wii
Adventure Gamers	3/5	
Eurogamer	4/10	
GameRevolution		D+
GameSpot	6.4/10	
GameSpy	2.5/5	
GameZone	8/10	5/10
IGN	7/10	4.9/10
Nintendo World Report		3.5/10
PC Gamer (US)	73%	
VideoGamer.com		6/10
The Times	3/5	

And Then There Were None has received widely varying reviews since its release. Metacritic's weighted average score for the game was 68 out of 100 on the PC and 50 out of 100 on the Wii, indicating "mixed or average reviews", with individual reviews falling between 20% and 90%. One aspect of the game which has garnered some criticism are the graphics. 2404 denounced the game's environments, commenting that "there are graphically better games that were made two years ago." An aspect of the game's graphics more heavily criticized was the character models, with GameSpy decrying them, saying: "The 3D models used for Mr. Owen's guests are crude and simplistic, with silly, sausage-like fingers, hair that looks like blocks of wood, lousy animation, poor lip-synching, and bland faces with barely any facial expression."

Adventure Gamers found many faults with the character designs, describing them as ugly, and no more realistic than the characters from Sierra's Gabriel Knight 3, released six years previously. However, Just Adventure commented that the characters are nicely designed, with detailed facial expressions during close-ups, but could have been better by current standards. Opinions on the character voice acting were generally positive: praised by Adventure Gamers for injecting life into the wooden character models, and ICGames commented that the voice acting made the characters convincing. However, GameSpy denounced the game for not allowing readers to skip through dialogue, instead forcing them to sit through hours of spoken words. Sound in And Then There Were None received mixed reactions as well, with Game Chronicles calling the sound decent, with realistic weather and animal sounds. 2404, in contrast, said that the game's music is pleasant and unannoying, but never captures the emotions and tensions in the game.

The puzzle aspects also received varying reactions. Game Over Online called the few puzzles bad, complaining that often the solutions were obscure and illogical, and did not advance the plot. GameSpot criticized the puzzles, saying that the player is "regularly tasked with backtracking back and forth across the island with only a vague notion of what to do in order to progress the story." 2404 was more encouraging, saying that although the game was formulaic, there was a welcome lack of mazes and slider puzzles in the game, making it more accessible to a wider audience.
