= Agatha Christie: Behind the Screen =

Game

Agatha Christie: Behind the Screen is an interactive murder mystery game published by Spinnaker Software in 1986 that requires the use of a VCR.

== Description ==
Agatha Christie: Behind the Screen is an interactive murder mystery game in which players watch a 30-minute drama on a VHS videocassette. The drama takes place in a boarding house, where the body of one of the boarders is discovered behind a Chinese screen during dinner. At certain times during the drama, the players stop the videotape and read clues read aloud from eight playing cards. At the end of the drama, the players must deduce who is the murderer.

The game also comes with a Detective's Notepad, a Solution Decoder Sheet and several blue/red decoders, and a 36-Page Answer Book. There are more than 250 possible combinations of clues which may lead to different endings, so the game can be replayed by the same players.

== Reception ==
In 1987, David M. Wilson reviewed the game for Computer Gaming World, and stated that "The concept of players actively participating in the denouement is not wholly bad [...] because families need to learn how to interact more with each other instead of always viewing their forms of entertainment passively."
