= The Ship (video game) =

2006 first-person shooter video game by Outerlight

- Developers: Outerlight; Blazing Griffin (Remastered)
- Publishers: WW: Outerlight (digital); NA: Merscom; EU: Mindscape; WW: Blazing Griffin (Remastered)
- Engine: Source; Unity (Remastered)
- Platform: Microsoft Windows
- Release: WW: 30 July 2006 (digital); EU: 15 September 2006; NA: 10 April 2007; WW: 31 October 2016 (Remastered)
- Genre: First-person shooter
- Modes: Single-player, multiplayer

The Ship (later retitled The Ship: Murder Party) is a first-person shooter video game developed by Outerlight using Valve's Source engine. The game was released on 11 July 2006, on Steam with retail distribution in Europe and Australia in September, and 10 April 2007, for North America. A playable concept for The Ship was released as a modification for the game Half-Life in 2004.

The game is set on a 1920s recreational cruise ship. Each player is assigned a quarry, and the object is to murder them with nobody watching, while at the same time watching out for, and defending themselves against their own hunter.

== Plot ==
A mysterious man named Mr. X has handed out free tickets for his luxury cruise. Little did the passengers know they were falling into his devious trap. All the passengers are required to track down and murder another passenger. If a passenger chooses not to do so, Mr. X will kill them.

=== Single-player plot ===
The single-player story begins with an introduction from Mr. X. He tells the passengers of his wish and warns that those too weak to play his "game" may be of use to the sharks, but not for him. The player assumes the role of Charlie Panther, second class passenger.

After (easily) dispatching his quarry, Charlie hears a young man whisper to him from a nearby third class cabin. Upon investigating, he is greeted (and complimented on how well he killed his quarry) by the young man who introduces himself as Jimmy the Bellboy. Jimmy explains that "Mr. X don't like no loose ends" and that he is planning on destroying the boat after the hunt is over—along with whoever wins. Jimmy then offers to get Charlie off the boat for $100,000. However, before he can start gathering money, Charlie has to deal with his own hunter. Jimmy suggests he find someone who looks just like him so he can fool his hunter.

Charlie notices someone who could definitely pass for him at the museum, so he steals a tranquilizer syringe from the sickbay and injects the man with it, causing him to instantly become unconscious. Charlie returns to Jimmy, who in turn tells Charlie's hunter that he is in the museum asleep, therefore taking the target off Charlie's back.

With Charlie safe (from his hunter, at least) Jimmy sends him to the Vesuvius bar on Deck B, where Bruno, the bartender, has him steal wallets from rich customers and give him half of what's in them. This works for a while, but the guard become suspicious of their plot, and Charlie is forced to leave.

Jimmy then directs him to the Fence, a portly British man in Deck B's restaurant. The Fence has Charlie steal several treasures (including the Holy Grail), paying him more for each returned. He then has to escort an ambassador around the ship to complete his "mission". After the ship is picked clean, Charlie returns to Jimmy, who has been injured by an assailant who was soon jailed. He tells Charlie that he wants the man dead, and if Charlie does him in, that he will take him off the boat for $25,000 less. Charlie gets himself arrested by pulling a weapon in front of a guard and is hauled to the brig. Inside the brig, Charlie meets with a very large muscle-bound convict, who hints to Charlie about the whereabouts of a knife hidden in a Bible. The convict is shot dead by the guards, however, as he begins to become insane with rage as he talks about Mr. X and the Bermuda Triangle. Charlie finds the shank in a bookshelf and stabs Jimmy's assailant. Upon being released from the brig, Jimmy is ecstatic that his assailant is dead and gladly takes $25K off Charlie's escape price. Charlie is then directed to a Japanese Yakuza, who wants the captain of the ship dead for having an affair with his wife. After killing him, Jimmy tells him that the captain is still alive. After killing the captain, this time for real, Charlie is directed to Miss Tweed, who wants him to kill some kidnappers who took her dog. The player then meets with them, but upon seeing that he does not have the ransom money, they kick the dog off the ship, presumably to its death. After killing the kidnappers, Charlie returns to Mrs. Tweed, who sobbingly (due to her dog going overboard) gives him the money. After, Charlie returns to Jimmy who gladly accepts the reduced price, but tells him to do one last job, in which he has to go to the Radar room of the ship, and put the radar itself out, so when in the water he can't be spotted by the crew. Returning to Jimmy on the Boat Deck, he wishes him good luck, and that the two can maybe see each other again.

As Charlie floats away in his escape boat and Mr. X flies off of the ship in a helicopter, a massive explosion tears through the ship, separating it in two, and starts to sink. It is then revealed that Mrs. Tweed's dog survived, as it pops out of the water. The screen suddenly goes black, which might have meant Charlie was hit by debris from the explosion. Charlie then wakes up in a hospital lying on a bed with a nurse treating him. Mr. X's voice is heard on the nearby speaker saying "Welcome ladies and gentlemen, welcome one and all..."

== Multiplayer gameplay ==
Each player is given a nickname by which they are identified. This is done to make it more difficult to tell players apart from NPCs, who have similar names and look the same as normal players. Each player is assigned a quarry, whom they must murder. The last known location of a player's quarry is always revealed to the player. However, the appearance of the quarry is only revealed if the player converses with the quarry.

There are several different weapons with which to eliminate one's quarry. Different amounts of money are rewarded for a kill depending on how difficult it is to use the weapon and how many times it has been used. If a player murders an NPC or anyone other than their quarry or hunter, a cash amount - dependent on the server settings - will be deducted from their bank account. Players with less than a certain figure, set by the server, in their bank account will be kicked from the cruise. Various weapons can be found scattered all around the ship, such as flare guns, fire axes, firearms, knives, swords, crowbars (which state "to be used by a free man" - a reference to Half-Life's storyline), even secret traps provided just for killing your quarry, like falling lifeboats, saunas, freezers, even a deck that turns into a 60 degree angle by command, among others.

If a player is seen pulling out a weapon in front of a guard or a camera, or spotted by eyewitnesses, then they are sent to jail. There is an "eye" symbol in the player's HUD that tells them whether they are being spotted or not; if they are watched by security the eye turns red; if not, the eye is green. The meter for trespassing counts down and the player is fined when the countdown is complete (and, if they run out of money to pay the fines, go to jail). Guards can be bribed to overlook weapons.

Everyone has eight needs similar to The Sims. Such needs are eating, drinking, sleeping, socialising, maintaining proper hygiene and using the bathroom. Some of the needs would cause impairment, such as lack of sleep would cause the player to fall asleep on the spot. Other needs could become fatal, such as thirst and hunger. If the player does not fulfill these needs, they will die, resulting in a loss of $1,000. Needs are sated by going to restaurants, taking showers, talking with other players, etc. This forces players into situations where they are vulnerable to attack, and also attempts to prevent players from camping.

== Reception ==
The Ship received generally positive reviews from critics and has a score of 78 on Metacritic. Reviewers praised the innovation of the game and their enjoyment of the game itself, but thought it would need some refinements and fixes to some inconsistencies to complete the game. It received less favorable reviews from players.

== Spiritual sequel ==
In September 2010, Ubisoft and Outerlight announced Bloody Good Time. The game was released on 28 October 2010 for Xbox Live Arcade and 29 October for Windows.

The game is very similar in style and gameplay. A mysterious individual, known as X (except this time he is a British director), finds eight stereotypical slasher victims being sent to kill each other or partake in other missions during scenes.

== Sequel/HD remake ==
In November 2011, developers Blazing Griffin bought the game from Outerlight, who were going to disband. Blazing Griffin ran a Kickstarter campaign in order to fund a direct steampunk-themed sequel to The Ship titled The Ship: Full Steam Ahead. After several months, Blazing Griffin was unable to secure the funding goal of £128,000, only amassing £18,247 instead.

The project appears to have been scrapped in favour of creating a HD remake of The Ship, titled The Ship: Remasted. The new iteration of the game is in response to the fact that when Blazing Griffin acquired the right of the game from Outerlight, they were not given a license to make technical changes to the source code and thus, were not legally allowed to make new updates or content for the game. The Ship: Remasted was released on Steam Early Access on 15 February 2016. It has since left Early Access.
