= Agatha Christie: Murder on the Orient Express =

2006 video game

- Developer: AWE Productions
- Publisher: The Adventure Company
- Designer: Lee Sheldon
- Series: Agatha Christie
- Platform: Microsoft Windows
- Release: NA: November 14, 2006; EU: March 9, 2007
- Genre: Adventure
- Mode: Single-player

Agatha Christie: Murder on the Orient Express is a 2006 adventure game developed by AWE Productions and published by The Adventure Company for Microsoft Windows. It is the second installment in The Adventure Company's Agatha Christie series. The setting is five years before the events in Agatha Christie: And Then There Were None, with a largely unrelated storyline. The story takes place in 1934 and follows an amateur sleuth, Antoinette Marceau, and her investigation of a murder with twelve possible suspects aboard the Orient Express, which has been blocked by an avalanche in Yugoslavia. She is aided by famous detective Hercule Poirot.

Murder on the Orient Express retains the main plot elements of Agatha Christie's 1934 novel of the same name. An additional ending is presented in the game which differs from the conclusion of Christie's novel. As with And Then There Were None, Christie's novel is bundled with the game. Some reviewers of Murder on the Orient Express criticized the game because of the repetitive nature of tasks the player must complete, and also complained about the inefficient and cumbersome inventory system. Others have praised it for improved graphics compared to And Then There Were None, as well as convincing voice acting and audio effects. Murder on the Orient Express is followed by Agatha Christie: Evil Under the Sun, the third installment in the Agatha Christie series.

Murder on the Orient Express is the first game in the Agatha Christie series to feature Hercule Poirot, Christie's most popular and famous detective. David Suchet, whose portrayal of Poirot achieved fame through the popular television series Agatha Christie's Poirot, was hired to provide Poirot's voice. His performance was generally met with praise. Some have criticized the game for not allowing the player to actually control Poirot; the developers explained this choice by saying that adventure gamers who make mistakes throughout the game do not reflect the genius of Poirot, but are better represented by amateur sleuth Antoinette Marceau.

== Gameplay ==
The player can navigate and interact with the game's environment, mainly carriages on the Orient Express, through use of a context-sensitive cursor. The cursor changes when it is placed over an item with which the player can interact, and can be used to talk to other characters, listen to other characters' conversations, look around the environment, and move. The player can walk to a location with a single click, and run to a location with a double-click. Double-clicking on the edge of the screen instantly takes the player to the next screen. There is a map of the train in the game's interface at the top of the screen, and once each carriage has been unlocked, the player can click on any part of the map and instantly be transported to that location, saving the player from having to travel through the train screen by screen. Another accessible feature is an objectives menu interface which states the general tasks the player should be attempting to complete. This menu is designed to guide players in the right direction without giving any explicit hints.

Antoinette Marceau looks through a carriage for clues.

Murder on the Orient Express, as with its predecessor, features an inventory system. There are several components of the inventory, including a fingerprint examination screen, a scrapbook, and a passport screen for managing and viewing the passengers' passports. There are a total of eighty slots for carrying items in the inventory, spread across five separate screens. Items cannot be discarded from the inventory once they have been acquired. The player can access the inventory by clicking on an icon on the game's interface, or can simply right-click. After items are used, a right-click returns them to the inventory, and the exact slot they were originally placed in. Each item is labelled, and the player can inspect each inventory item in more detail by dragging it over a magnifying glass icon, and can also listen for a soft hissing sound which indicates that there is something relevant for the player to note about a certain item. In a divergence from other games in its genre, Murder on the Orient Express does not allow the player to combine items in the main inventory screen. There is a separate interface for item combinations, and the player must drag items into this screen if they wish to try to combine them.

A large portion of gameplay in Murder on the Orient Express has the player questioning characters and listening to lengthy periods of dialogue in order to acquire clues which may lead to the murderer. Other tasks the player must complete include collecting passports and other paraphernalia left by the passengers in an effort to acquire clues to lead to the solution of the murder, and retrieving certain objects for various characters. Combining items in the inventory forms a major part of the puzzles in the game. There are no puzzles with time limits in the game, although some puzzles require correct timing. There are also several single screen puzzles, such as a safe-cracking puzzle.

A unique feature of Murder on the Orient Express is Poirot, who serves as a hint system for the duration of the game. The player can access Poirot at any time during the game, and can receive hints to help them proceed. The game has two difficulty levels, and the player can determine which one they prefer to play at soon after the murder occurs. Poirot challenges the player, allowing them to choose to either readily accept help from him and allow him to guide the player through the game, or alternatively try to outsmart the famous sleuth by solving the mystery with obscure, and in some cases nonexistent hints. If the player has trouble once they have chosen the more difficult setting, Poirot will gradually become more forthcoming with information.

== Synopsis ==
=== Setting and characters ===
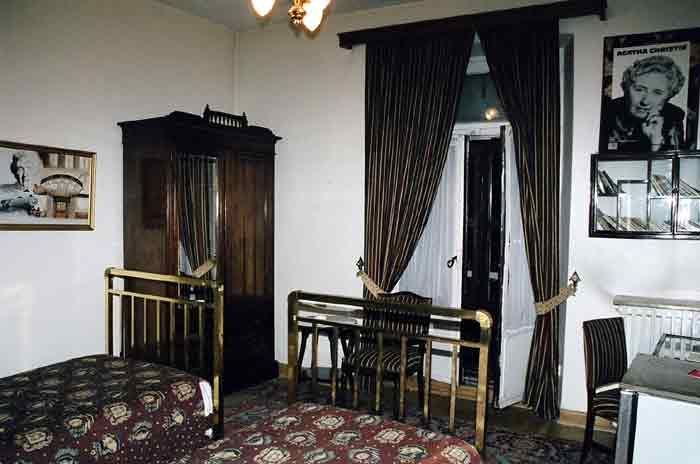
Room 411 at the Pera Palace Hotel in Istanbul, the room where Agatha Christie wrote Murder on the Orient Express.

Murder on the Orient Express is set in the year 1934. The game initially begins in Istanbul, Turkey, while the remaining majority occurs within the carriages of the Orient Express on its way to Paris, France, when it is blocked by an avalanche in the middle of Yugoslavia. However, the player has some opportunities to venture outside the train into the snowy exterior environment.

The player character is Antoinette Marceau, a devoted junior clerk at the Istanbul offices of the Compagnie Internationale des Wagons-Lits. At the encouragement of her employer Marcel Bouc, she is to tend to the wishes of Bouc's friend Hercule Poirot, and the two work together. She is also aided by Poirot's friend Dr. Constantine. Ten of the thirteen murder suspects from Christie's novel are included in the game adaption. These suspects are Count and Countess Andrenyi, Colonel Arbuthnot, Mary Debenham, Princess Dragomiroff, Greta Ohlsson, Antonio Foscarelli, Cyrus Hardman, Caroline Hubbard, Hector McQueen, and several staff on the Orient Express. The victim is Samuel Ratchett. In total, there are twenty characters featured in the game.

=== Plot ===
In 1924, on the outskirts of New Paltz, New York. Police have a farmhouse surrounded and issue a final warning to surrender. The men inside refuse. A fierce exchange of gunfire follows, echoing across the countryside. When the shooting ends, silence settles over the scene. At last, the farmhouse door creaks open, and two unknown men step out with their hands raised, surrendering to the waiting officers.

10 years later, in 1934, Antoinette Marceau begins her adventure in Sirkeci Terminal, Istanbul. She becomes acquainted with Poirot, whom she admires, as well as the other characters who later accompany her aboard the Orient Express. Soon after the train departs Istanbul for Paris and makes a brief stop in Belgrade, the passage is blocked by an avalanche stopping it between Vinkovci and Brod. The sudden stop causes Poirot to fall out of his bunk and sprain his ankle, rendering him bed-ridden. Soon after, Ratchett is found murdered, with twelve possible suspects to the murder, and the investigation begins. Marceau is challenged by Poirot to find the solution to the murder and do the legwork by gathering clues. Marceau splits her time between seeing to the duties of the train (such as helping to fix the heat in the engine), interviewing passengers about the murder, and examining the train and surrounding area for clues. She travels to several additional locations that Poirot does not travel to in the book, such as the engine, the baggage car, and an old shack outside of the snowed-in train. Additionally, a sabotaged ham radio is in one of the compartments which, when repaired, allows Antoinette to contact Barnaby Lewes, a young friend of Poirot's, and ask him to research the passengers.

Ratchett is eventually revealed to be Cassetti, the criminal mastermind behind the Daisy Armstrong kidnapping. Each of the passengers on the train as well as the conductor are connected in some way to the Armstrong family, each with a motive for murder. Additionally, each person had an alibi corroborated by other passengers.

When Marceau believes she has solved the murder, Poirot gathers the passengers and poses a series of questions to Marceau about the clues found. Three possible solutions to Ratchett's death emerge. In the first, Poirot suggests that an assassin may have come aboard the train during the night, killed Cassetti, and then escaped the train, which is supported by evidence such as a bloodied stiletto with fingerprints that do not match anyone on the train. The second solution pieces together a number of clues showing that all of the train's passengers and the conductor, Pierre Michel, are responsible for the murder, to which they confess.

Unique to this adaptation of the story, Antoinette finds additional clues such as a crate full of living accommodations in the security vault of the baggage compartment and a picture of Michel's family, despite Barnaby Lewes reporting that the man has none. After explaining the second solution, Poirot reveals that Michel is not who he appears, but is in fact Robert Perkinson, Cassetti's criminal partner. Perkinson confirms this to the shock of the other passengers, and reveals that Cassetti kept Daisy Armstrong at his house. But when he and his brother, Jeffrey, refused to kill Daisy, Cassetti decided to do the job himself. In doing so, he gunned down Perkinson's daughter, Teresa, whom he mistook for Daisy. Afterwards, Perkinson and his wife fled to France and raised Daisy as their own daughter.

Perkinson reveals that, after his wife's death, he had sought out Pierre Michel, and that Michel had told him of the plan to murder Cassetti. However, in spite of his own loss, he was too afraid to go through with it himself. Since the others had never seen Michel in person, Perkinson volunteered to impersonate Michel and stab Cassetti on his behalf so that he could get revenge for Teresa's death. He then reveals that the now 13-year-old Daisy Armstrong has been hidden in the baggage compartment of the train during the journey, having boarded at Belgrade disguised as an attendant. Daisy then comes out to meet the people who thought she was dead. Poirot, Dr. Constantine, and Antoinette decide to tell the police when they arrive in Brod, the first solution – that an unknown assassin came aboard the train, killed Rachett, and left. The passengers are overjoyed that Daisy is alive and Poirot concludes that it is "a most satisfactory solution indeed."

== Development ==
Murder on the Orient Express was announced in May 2006, as the second installment in The Adventure Company's Agatha Christie series. As with the game's predecessor, And Then There Were None, Murder on the Orient Express was developed by AWE Productions, in collaboration with producer The Adventure Company. The production team remained largely the same, with Lee Sheldon reprising his role as Lead Designer, and Scott Nixon from AWE Productions reprising his position as Managing Director.

The Adventure Company and Chorion, the owners of the rights to Christie's works, chose Agatha Christie's novel Murder on the Orient Express, widely considered the author's magnum opus, as the basis for the next game in the Agatha Christie series. AWE Productions had little influence in the choice, other than being asked for an opinion. Sheldon created a concept document for the new game and sent it to Chorion, who sent it back with some suggestions. Sheldon agreed to some of these, but refused others. Chorion was generally more comfortable with the development team for their second outing. They did not have to scrutinize every aspect of the game as with And Then There Were None, and generally had fewer complaints with Murder on the Orient Express, as opposed to its predecessor.

Mike Adams, the producer of Murder on the Orient Express, was extremely determined to have David Suchet as the voice actor for Poirot, a major character in the game. Nixon thought that Suchet had become so intertwined with the character of Poirot, after his success with the television series Agatha Christie's Poirot, that it would be hard to imagine someone else doing Poirot's voice without constantly being compared to Suchet. Nixon described the situation as a catch-22, saying that he "worried about someone coming in and doing a Suchet impression instead of a unique rendition of Poirot, yet the more the voice strays from Suchet's version, the more people will wish it was Suchet doing it!" Another reason for the development team's determination to have Suchet aboard was that they thought he would spur the other voice actors in the game, such as Vanessa Marshall who portrayed Antoinette Marceau, to step up and compete with Suchet's skillful portrayal of Poirot. Fairly late in the game's development, Suchet agreed to do the voice acting. He admitted that one reason for his acceptance of the offer was that he felt possessive of the role of Poirot, considering he had been portraying the character for so long. Adams expressed pride at having succeeded in convincing Suchet to do voice acting for Murder on the Orient Express, and said that his skillful voice acting would bring "tremendous excitement and authenticity" to the game.

As with And Then There Were None, Sheldon introduced a new character to the plot of Murder on the Orient Express, who was not present in Christie's novel, in order to fulfill the role of a player character and protagonist. The character, Antoinette Marceau, is described by Sheldon as an amalgam of two characters from the novel. These were Poirot's friend who ran the Orient Express, Marcel Bouc, and a young soldier who is present in both the novel and the film version of the story, who shepherds Poirot to Istanbul. Sheldon stated that he did not want to create entirely new protagonists for the Christie games, but rather preferred to draw from sources in Christie's novels to piece together the games' protagonists. Sheldon also addressed concerns from several early previews of the game, which asked why the player could not actually play as Poirot. He explained the choice of Marceau as the protagonist, saying "the reason for choosing Marceau over Poirot as the protagonist is that most of the fun of Poirot is seeing what he is up to, watching how he acts and solves things. I've always thought the more interesting character was the 'Watson' character rather than the Sherlock Holmes character."

To make Poirot an even more integral part of Murder on the Orient Express, Sheldon made him into an elaborate hint system. After players complained about a sense of aimlessness in And Then There Were None, which arose whilst they tried to find a trigger to begin the next section of gameplay, Sheldon made Poirot an "oracle of sorts," who can provide help whenever the player is stuck or unsure of what to do next.

The development team decided that, as with And Then There Were None, they would change Christie's original ending for Murder on the Orient Express. The aim of the developers was to create games that would not only appeal to casual gamers, but also to Christie fans. As nearly all Christie fans have read Murder on the Orient Express, and know the solution, and considering that the novel was to be included with the game, the developers decided that the ending needed to be changed. The novel has two solutions – one being what appears to be happening and the other being what is actually occurring – and the developers aimed to develop a third solution which drew on these two solutions and still surprised the player. Lee Sheldon admitted that his variation to the ending of And Then There Were None received some criticism, and said that in Murder on the Orient Express changing the ending was even harder because of the sheer fame of the book and its solution. He also expressed his hatred of adaptations of older material which make fun of that time period, and said that he was trying to stay as faithful to Christie's work and time era as possible.

A major difference between And Then There Were None and Murder on the Orient Express that Sheldon pointed out was that in the former, the premise of the novel was that no one solved the murder. This forced Sheldon to desperately try to find a way to integrate clues into the story so that the player could actually discover the murderer, although the game remained quite non-interactive. In Murder on the Orient Express, the actual novel follows an investigation, so Sheldon could more easily integrate clues to lead to all three possible solutions. Sheldon also excised unnecessary puzzles from Murder on the Orient Express, as they were an unpopular feature of its predecessor.

Several graphical improvements were made to Murder on the Orient Express over And Then There Were None. These were mostly dedicated to character design and animation, which were extremely poorly received features of the first Christie game. The development team introduced animation layers, allowing them to control parts of character models independently. This allowed the developers to use the same animations whether the character was sitting, standing or lying down, and also gave them more head and upper body control. In And Then There Were None, characters had to rotate their entire bodies to talk to one another, whereas in Murder on the Orient Express, characters can simply turn their heads. The game has no physics features, but screen resolution has been increased, more detailed backgrounds have been made, and characters models contain more polygons.

Research was a major component of the developmental stages of Murder on the Orient Express. Most of the research was focused on Yugoslavia in 1934, the game's setting. Sheldon focused on the political and scientific situation of this era, and explained his intensive research, saying "all of the puzzles have to be contextual. They all have to either help character, help story or define period." The developers also drew influence from a train museum outside Miami with an original Pullman carriage – the same as the carriages used on the Orient Express in the 1930s. The museum also contained a locomotive similar to the one the developers were looking for. The developers ended up using the train museum, several books about the Orient Express, the 1974 film version of Christie's novel, and the internet as research resources. With Murder on the Orient Express being the first Poirot game produced, Sheldon was careful that the game fitted into Christie's timeline of Poirot's exploits. The television series often took liberties with the time in which stories were set, but Sheldon was determined to keep everything in strict accordance with Christie's work. There are several references in the game to Poirot's earlier cases, all of which are chronologically accurate. This was partly so that Sheldon could use the culture of specific eras of time, and also so that in the future other Poirot-based games will be chronologically accurate.

The official site for Murder on the Orient Express was unveiled in September 2006, and contains screenshots, character biographies and photos, environment artwork, trailers, demos, music, wallpaper and contests. Murder on the Orient Express was released on November 14, 2006 in North America. The Adventure Company held a launch party for the gaming press two days after the game was shipped. Among the guests were the development team of Murder on the Orient Express, and actors portraying the game's various characters. The demo for Murder on the Orient Express was released on December 20, 2006, and contained a small portion of the game which has the player exploring the train.

== Reception ==
Reception

Aggregate scores
Aggregator	Score
GameRankings	65.22%
Metacritic	60/100

Review scores
Publication	Score
Adventure Gamers	3/5
Eurogamer	4/10
GameSpot	5.8/10
GamesRadar+	2.5/5
GameZone	7/10
IGN	6.1/10
PC Format	27%
PC Gamer (UK)	51%
PC Gamer (US)	71%
PC Zone	61%

Since its release, Murder on the Orient Express has received widely differing reviews. GameRankings gave it a score of 65.22%, while Metacritic gave it 60 out of 100.

An aspect of gameplay in Murder on the Orient Express which received largely negative reactions was the repetitive nature of many tasks the player must complete. 2404 accused the game of reducing Christie's novel, and the game, into a series of repetitive and secretarial tasks, such as collecting fingerprints, passports, and other random items. The site further went on to say that the player is made to feel "like a secretary for Poirot." Game Over Online agreed with this view, saying that much of the game consisted of "goofy little errands" such as completing tasks for characters and mindlessly searching for objects. Eurogamer provides an example of this, by saying that at one point in the game the player is required to go through each cabin checking the shoe sizes of the various passengers' shoes to check if one matches shoe prints outside the train. The inventory system featured in Murder on the Orient Express has also received significant criticism. IGN complained that instead of being able to find item combinations through trial and error in the main screen, the player is forced to drag items to a separate screen, leading to tedious gameplay. Some reviewers, in contrast, praised the inventory system, with Quandary calling it intuitive, and easy for players to organize. The puzzles in Murder on the Orient Express received positive responses from some reviewers. GameSpot commented favourably on the relatively small number of puzzles in the game, saying that they are integrated fairly well within the plot, and are not excessively difficult. The review went on to say that later puzzles in the game often rely more heavily on inventory combinations, but are still reasonably satisfying to solve. Game Over Online, in comparison, accused the game of giving the player too little information to solve puzzles, and also called the puzzles convoluted. The choice of the developers of Murder on the Orient Express to use Antoinette Marceau, rather than Poirot, as the protagonist and player character was criticized by some. 2404 disapproved of the choice, accusing the developers of not fully utilizing the talent of David Suchet, arguably the most famous and successful portrayer of Poirot. The reviewer even went so far as to tell AWE Productions to "make use of talent like David Suchet when you've got it." Like its predecessor, Murder on the Orient Express was criticized for diverging from Christie's original ending. Adventure Gamers called the new ending "a little too contrived for the game's good." 2404 also disapproved of the ending, commenting that it goes off in too much of a Hollywood direction, and that the original ending is much better and a far more satisfying conclusion.

Murder on the Orient Express received some praise for graphical improvements over its predecessor. Among the aspects of the game which received positive reactions were the game's environments. Just Adventure called the game environments "head and shoulders above And Then There Were None," describing the train's carriages on the Orient Express as oozing with elegance, and a faithful and accurate recreation of the 1930s. The site criticized the game for suffering graphically in later stages, but praised it overall for improving on the graphics of And Then There Were None. Character models were another aspect of Murder on the Orient Express which received positive attention. Quandary described the character modelling as much improved from And Then There Were None, and while still a tinge woody, "all the characters feel as if they just stepped out of the book." Adventure Gamers called the characters "some of the best seen in recent adventure games," saying that each character has a unique design and costume perfect for the game's setting. The reviewer also pointed out several small touches added to the characters, such as the main character shivering when she is outside the train in the cold weather, and also brushing lint off her clothing while waiting for the player to decide what to do next. Adventure Gamers also complimented AWE Productions for lighting effects in the game, and for creating a "very soft glow to the scenes, which give a much more lifelike look to the characters." IGN agreed that the interior of the Orient Express is quite sharp, but complained that character models lack detail and are animated awkwardly. Another complaint from IGN was that the compression used for cutscenes causes the animations to look "washed out and blocky," and that this problem continues as the cutscenes are noticeably pixelated throughout Murder on the Orient Express.

An aspect of Murder on the Orient Express which many reviewers praised was the game's audio. The voice acting in particular gained widespread positive reviews. GameSpot called the voice acting excellent, with the voice actors bringing the characters to life, thanks largely to David Suchet as Poirot. IGN also called the voice acting well done, despite a few characters sounding artificial. Music in the game was positively reviewed by 2404, who said that it was tense at moments, but probably could have been played more frequently throughout the game. 2404 also praised the game for providing realistic sound effects, such as noises coming from the Orient Express itself, and other environmental noises such as howling wind. IGN, in contrast, heavily criticized the game for a lack of background music, and simplistic and monotonous sound effects.

Murder on the Orient Express was used as a learning tool during a study on learner autonomy in video games. This study took Greek high school students and had them involved in several tests and evaluations at several different points of the study.
