= Agatha Christie: Evil Under the Sun =

2007 video game

- Developer: AWE Productions
- Publisher: The Adventure Company
- Director: Scott Nixon
- Designer: Lee Sheldon
- Programmer: Jamie Nye
- Artist: Kris Creco
- Composer: Joshua Nosley
- Series: Agatha Christie series
- Platforms: Windows, Wii
- Release: Windows: NA: October 15, 2007; EU: November 23, 2007; Wii: NA: November 18, 2008; EU: December 5, 2008
- Genre: Adventure
- Mode: Single-player

Agatha Christie: Evil Under the Sun is a video game by AWE Productions released for the Windows and Nintendo Wii, and is the third installment of The Adventure Company's Agatha Christie series based on Agatha Christie's 1941 novel Evil Under the Sun. The Windows version was released in 2007, and the Wii version one year later.

Evil Under the Sun features Hercule Poirot as the protagonist, unlike the previous game in the series, Agatha Christie: Murder on the Orient Express, which had featured Poirot as a non-playable character. It also features numerous improvements and expanded gameplay elements, with a new inventory system, dialogue choices, and more environments. While players take the role of Poirot, they are actually playing as Captain Hastings playing as Poirot, in an interactive scenario designed by Poirot in order to allow his long-time friend a chance to solve the mystery in the way Poirot would.

== Plot ==
The game's plot follows Poirot as he investigates the murder of a noted actress on an island. It is divided into two sections: story-time, in which Poirot uncovers the secrets of Seadrift Island, and real-time, in Poirot's office in London, in which the player, as Captain Hastings, can request hints, review information and consult the locations of the suspects on a wall map.

Despite the fact that the murderer remains the same, new plot aspects are included, such as new characters, a slight change of location, and the fact that Hastings becomes a part of the plot. Poirot's voice is performed by actor Kevin Delaney.

== Reception ==
Reception

Aggregate scores
| Aggregator | Score | |
| Aggregator | PC | Wii |
|---|---|---|
| GameRankings | 68.94% | 49% |
| Metacritic | 66/100 | 46/100 |

Review scores
| Publication | Score | |
| Publication | PC | Wii |
|---|---|---|
| Adventure Gamers | 2.5/5 | N/A |
| GameSpot | 5/10 | N/A |
| GameZone | 7/10 | N/A |
| IGN | 6/10 | 4.6/10 |
| Official Nintendo Magazine | N/A | 43% |
| PC Gamer (US) | 58% | N/A |

Reviews of Evil Under the Sun ranged from mixed to negative. GameRankings and Metacritic gave it a score of 69% and 66 out of 100 for the PC version, and 49% and 46 out of 100 for the Wii version.
