= The A.B.C. Murders =

1936 mystery novel by Agatha Christie

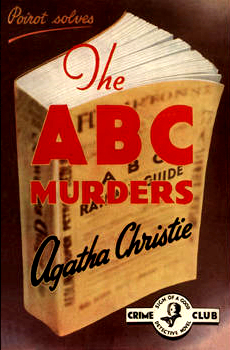
- Dust-jacket illustration of the first UK edition
- Author: Agatha Christie
- Cover artist: Not known
- Series: Hercule Poirot
- Genre: Crime novel
- Publisher: Collins Crime Club
- Publication date: 6 January 1936
- Publication place: United Kingdom
- Media type: Print (hardback and paperback)
- Pages: 256 (first edition, hardback)
- ISBN: 978-1-57912-624-7
- Preceded by: Death in the Clouds
- Followed by: Murder in Mesopotamia

The A.B.C. Murders is a work of detective fiction by British writer Agatha Christie, featuring her characters Hercule Poirot, Arthur Hastings and Chief Inspector Japp, as they contend with a series of killings by a mysterious murderer known only as "A.B.C.". The book was first published in the UK by the Collins Crime Club on 6 January 1936, sold for seven shillings and sixpence (7/6) (Note: Equivalent to £23 in 2025.) while a US edition, published by Dodd, Mead and Company on 14 February of the same year, was priced $2.00. (Note: Equivalent to $46 in 2025.)

The form of the novel is unusual, combining first-person narrative and third-person narrative. This approach was previously used by Agatha Christie in The Man in the Brown Suit. In The A.B.C. Murders the third-person narrative is supposedly reconstructed by the first-person narrator of the story, Arthur Hastings.

The initial premise is that a serial killer is murdering people with alliterative names. The murders follow an alphabetical order, starting with a victim whose initials were A. A., and appear to lack a motive.

The novel was well received in the UK and the US when it was published. One reviewer said it was "a baffler of the first water", while another remarked on Christie's ingenuity in the plot. A reviewer in 1990 said it was "a classic, still fresh story, beautifully worked out".

== Plot ==
Returning from South America, Arthur Hastings meets with his old friend, Hercule Poirot, at his new flat in London. Poirot shows him a mysterious letter he has received, signed "A.B.C.", that details a crime that is to be committed very soon, which he suspects will be a murder. Two more letters of the same nature soon arrive at his flat, each before a murder being carried out by A.B.C., and committed in alphabetical order: Alice Ascher, killed in her tobacco shop in Andover; Elizabeth "Betty" Barnard, a flirty waitress killed on the beach at Bexhill; and Sir Carmichael Clarke, a wealthy man, killed at his home in Churston. In each murder, an ABC Rail Guide is left beside the victim.

The police team for the investigation, led by Chief Inspector Japp, includes Inspector Crome, who doubts Poirot's detective abilities, and Dr. Thompson, who tries to profile the killer. Poirot forms a "Legion" of relatives of the deceased to uncover new information: Franklin Clarke, Sir Carmichael's brother; Mary Drower, Ascher's niece; Donald Fraser, Betty's fiancé; Megan Barnard, Betty's elder sister, and Thora Grey, Sir Carmichael's young assistant. Following a meeting with the third victim's widow, Lady Clarke, one key similarity between the murders is established – on the day of each murder, a man selling silk stockings has appeared at or near each crime scene. Despite this information, Poirot wonders why the letters were sent to him, rather than the police or the newspapers, and why the third letter misspelled Poirot's address, causing a delay in his receipt of it. Soon, A.B.C. sends his next letter, directing everybody to Doncaster, where it is suspected that the next murder will occur at the St. Leger Stakes race meeting that day. However, the murderer strikes at a cinema instead, and the victim's name does not match the alphabetical pattern of the other killings.

The police soon get a tip-off about the man linked to the murders – Alexander Bonaparte Cust, an epileptic travelling salesman, who suffers from memory blackouts and constant agonising headaches as the result of a head injury during the First World War. Cust flees his apartment but collapses upon arriving at the Andover police station, where he is taken into custody. Apart from claiming that a stocking firm hired him, he lacks any memory of committing the murders but believes he must be guilty of them – he had been at the cinema when the last murder occurred and found blood on his sleeve and a knife in his pocket after he had left. The police learn that the firm in question never hired Cust. Their search of his room turns up an unopened box of ABC railway guides and the typewriter and fine paper used in A.B.C.'s letters, while the knife is discovered in the hallway outside his room where he dropped it. Poirot doubts Cust's guilt because of his memory blackouts, and especially because he had a solid alibi for the Bexhill murder.

Calling a Legion meeting, Poirot proclaims Cust's innocence, and exposes Franklin Clarke as the A.B.C. murderer. His motive was simple: Lady Clarke is slowly dying from cancer, and Sir Carmichael has left her a life interest in his estate, which would then go to his brother after her death. However, had Carmichael survived her, he would probably have married his assistant Thora and had children, who would have inherited instead. Franklin feared a possible second marriage, as he wants all of his brother's wealth, so he chose to murder his brother while Lady Clarke was still alive. A chance encounter with Cust at a pub gave Franklin the idea for the murder plot – he would disguise his crime as part of a serial killing. Having created the letters Poirot would receive, Franklin set up Cust with his job, giving him the typewriter and other items Franklin would use to frame him for the murders. A suggestion by Hastings makes clear that the third letter was misaddressed intentionally because Franklin wanted no chance of the police interrupting that murder. Franklin then followed Cust to the cinema, committed the last murder, and planted the knife on him as he left.

Franklin laughs off Poirot's theory but panics when he is told that his fingerprint has been found on Cust's typewriter key and that Milly Higley, a co-worker of Betty Barnard, saw him in her company. Franklin attempts to end his life with his own gun, only to find that Poirot has emptied it with the help of a pickpocket. With the case solved, Poirot pairs off Donald with Megan. Later, Cust tells Poirot that the press has made him an offer for his story; Poirot suggests that he demand a higher price for it and that his headaches may have arisen from his poorly fitted spectacles. Once alone, Poirot tells Hastings that the claim of the fingerprint on the typewriter was a bluff but is pleased that the pair "went hunting once more".

== Characters ==
- Hercule Poirot – Renowned Belgian detective, involved in investigating the serial killings by A.B.C., due to letters received from him.
- Captain Arthur Hastings – Poirot's old friend and companion on the case. He is also the narrator of the novel.
- Inspector Japp – Poirot's old friend in Scotland Yard, and the chief investigating officer into the serial killings.
- Inspector Crome – Part of Japp's police team investigating the murders. Initially in charge of the Bexhill murder, and maintains a low opinion of Poirot.
- Dr Thompson – Forensic psychologist, assigned to Japp's police team. Focuses on making a profile of the killer.
- A.B.C. – The unknown, cold-blooded serial killer of the case. His pattern of murders is done in alphabetical order, with his calling card being an ABC railway guide left at each crime scene.
- Alice Ascher – A.B.C.'s first victim. An elderly woman with no children, and the owner of a tobacco shop in Andover.
- Betty Barnard – A.B.C.'s second victim. A young, flirtatious part-time waitress in Bexhill.
- Sir Carmichael Clarke – A.B.C.'s third victim. A rich, childless old man from Churston.
- George Earlsfield – A.B.C.'s fourth victim. A barber by trade, killed at a cinema in Doncaster. Considered illogical to be a victim in the pattern of A.B.C.'s murders.
- Franklin Clarke – Sir Carmichael's aggrieved younger brother and his immediate successor. A member of the Legion assisting Poirot in the investigation, responsible for inspiring Poirot to form the group.
- Mary Drower – Ascher's niece. A member of the Legion assisting Poirot in the investigation.
- Megan Barnard – Betty's elder, sensible and comparatively down to earth sister. A member of the Legion assisting Poirot in the investigation.
- Donald Fraser – Betty's would-be fiancé, and a temperamental man. Initially a suspect in her murder, he later becomes a member in the Legion.
- Thora Grey – Sir Carmichael Clarke's attractive young assistant. A member of the Legion assisting Poirot in the investigation.
- Alexander Bonaparte Cust – An epileptic travelling salesman; his condition is the result of a blow to the head during the war, leaving him prone to blackouts and severe headaches. The prime suspect of the case, unknowingly set up by A.B.C., and the main red herring of the novel.
- Franz Ascher – Alice's alcoholic and estranged husband. The initial suspect in his wife's murder.
- Milly Higley – A co-worker of Betty.
- Charlotte, Lady Clarke – Sir Carmichael's wife, suffering from terminal cancer. Rendered delusional or irritated by the medication she takes.
- Roger Downes – School teacher visiting the cinema in Doncaster, and comes across Earlsfield's body after his murder.
- Lily Marbury – Daughter of Cust's landlady, who warns him about the police coming after him.
- Tom Hartigan – Lily's boyfriend, who tells police of his suspicions about Cust's movements on the day of Earlsfield's murder.

== Literary significance and reception ==
The Times Literary Supplement on 11 January 1936 concluded, with a note of admiration for the plot that, "If Mrs Christie ever deserts fiction for crime, she will be very dangerous: no one but Poirot will catch her."

Isaac Anderson in The New York Times Book Review of 16 February 1936 finished his review by writing, "This story is a baffler of the first water, written in Agatha Christie's best manner. It seems to us the very best thing she has done, not even excepting Roger Ackroyd."

In The Observer's issue of 5 January 1936, "Torquemada" (Edward Powys Mathers) wrote, "Ingenuity ... is a mild term for Mrs Christie's gift. In The A.B.C. Murders, rightly chosen by the [crime] club as its book of the month, she has quite altered her method of attack upon the reader, and yet the truth behind this fantastic series of killings is as fairly elusive as any previous truth which Poirot has had to capture for us. The reader adopts two quite different mental attitudes as he reads. At first, and for a great many pages, he is asking himself: "Is Agatha Christie going to let me down? Does she think she can give us this kind of tale as a detective story and get away with it?" Then the conviction comes to him that he has been wronging the authoress, and that he alone is beginning to see through her artifice. In the last chapter he finds, because brilliant circus work with a troop of red horses and one dark herring has diverted his attention from a calm consideration of motive, he has not been wronging, but merely wrong. It is noticeable, by the way, that characters break off at intervals to tell us that we have to do with "a homicidal murderer". We are ready to take this for granted until Mrs Christie (I wouldn't put it past her) gives us one who isn't."

E R Punshon reviewed the novel in 1936, writing that "Some readers are drawn to the detective novel by the sheer interest of watching and perhaps anticipating the logical development of a given theme, others take their pleasure in following the swift succession of events in an exciting story, and yet others find themselves chiefly interested in the psychological reactions caused by crime impinging upon the routine of ordinary life. Skilful and happy is that author who can weave into a unity this triple thread. In Mrs Agatha Christie's new book...the task is attempted with success." He added, "In the second chapter, Mrs Christie shows us what seems to be the maniac himself. But the wise reader, remembering other tales of Mrs Christie's, will murmur to himself 'I trust her not; odds on she is fooling me,' and so will continue to a climax it is not 'odds on' but a dead cert he will not have guessed. To an easy and attractive style and an adequate if not very profound sense of character Mrs Christie adds an extreme and astonishing ingenuity, nor does it very greatly matter that it is quite impossible to accept the groundwork of her tale or to suppose that any stalking-horse would behave so invariably so exactly as required. As at Bexhill, a hitch would always occur. In the smooth and apparently effortless perfection with which she achieves her ends Mrs. Christie reminds one of Noël Coward; she might, indeed, in that respect be called the Noël Coward of the detective novel."

An unnamed reviewer in the Daily Mirror of 16 January 1936 said, "I'm thanking heaven I've got a name that begins with a letter near the end of the alphabet! That's just in case some imitative soul uses this book as a text book for some nice little series of murders." They summed up, "It's Agatha Christie at her best."

Robert Barnard reviewed this novel favorably, calling it "A classic, still fresh story, beautifully worked out." He noted that the plot "differs from the usual pattern in that we seem to be involved in a chase: the series of murders appears to be the work of a maniac. In fact the solution reasserts the classic pattern of a closed circle of suspects, with a logical, well-motivated murder plan. The English detective story cannot embrace the irrational, it seems." His final judgment on this novel is that it was "a total success – but thank God she didn't try taking it through to Z".

In the "Binge!" article of Entertainment Weekly issue #1343–44 (26 December 2014 – 3 January 2015), the writers picked The A.B.C. Murders as an "EW favorite" on the list of the "Nine Great Christie Novels".

== References to other works ==
In Chapter 1, Poirot alludes to a situation in the 1935 novel, Three Act Tragedy. In the same chapter, Poirot mentions his failed attempt at retirement to grow vegetable marrows as depicted in The Murder of Roger Ackroyd.

In Chapter 3, an exchange between Japp and Poirot shows that, in 1935, Christie was already thinking about Poirot's death as later narrated in Curtain: "I shouldn't wonder if you ended by detecting your own death," said Japp, laughing heartily. "That's an idea, that is. Ought to be put in a book." "It will be Hastings who will have to do that," said Poirot, twinkling at me. "Ha ha! That would be a joke, that would," laughed Japp."

Still in Chapter 3, Poirot lays out the plot of what he considers a perfect crime, a crime so challenging that "even he" would find it hard to solve. This exact murder – where someone is murdered by one of four people playing bridge in the same room with him – is the subject of Christie's Cards on the Table, which was published later in the same year and which, in turn, features Hercule Poirot and has another character refer to him as the man who solved the ABC murders.

In Chapter 19, Poirot reflects over his first case in England, where he "brought together two people who loved one another by the simple method of having one of them arrested for murder". This is a reference to the novel The Mysterious Affair at Styles, and the lovers mentioned are John and Mary Cavendish.

== References in other works ==
The plot of The A.B.C. Murders is mentioned by Detective Inspector John Appleby in Michael Innes′ novel Appleby's End (1945).

Chapters 393–397 of Gosho Aoyama's manga Detective Conan feature a case with some similarities as the criminal was inspired by the plot of The A.B.C. Murders. Episodes 325–327 of its anime adaptation also featured the incident. The 1998 anime film Case Closed: The Fourteenth Target is a combination of this story, with a murderer killing based on numbers in names as a ruse to confuse detectives, while also incorporating Christie's And Then There Were None.

A Bengali detective novel of Narayan Sanyal 'O Aa Ka Khuner Kanta' was based on The A.B.C. Murders. Sanyal admitted the inspiration from Christie's novel in the introduction to the book. Here the character P. K. Basu, Bar-at-law, has the role of main protagonist, similar to Poirot.

== Film, TV and other adaptations ==
=== Film ===
The first adaptation of the novel was the 1965 film The Alphabet Murders with Tony Randall as Hercule Poirot, a version far more comic than mysterious. The story of the 2012 Malayalam film Grandmaster written by director B. Unnikrishnan draws inspirations from The A.B.C. Murders. The characterisation of Chandrasekhar in the movie as played by the Indian movie veteran Mohanlal, while inspired by that of the legendary Hercule Poirot, has more to do with the popular established screen persona of Mohanlal in Malayalam.

=== Radio ===
The BBC Radio adaptation Poirot – The ABC Murders starring John Moffatt and Simon Williams was first broadcast in 2000. The show is periodically rebroadcast on BBC Radio 4 Extra.

The 18 May 1943 episode of Suspense was an adaptation of The ABC Murders, starring Charles Laughton as Cust. The plot was heavily condensed, with Poirot completely absent.

An audio adaptation was released by Audible in 2025, with Peter Dinklage as Poirot and Himesh Patel as Hastings. The cast also features Sam Claflin, Joel Fry, Lydia West, Rahul Kohli, Ben Hardy, Amrita Acharia, Sian Clifford and Rosie Cavaliero.

=== Television ===
Agatha Christie's Poirot (1992)

In 1992, the novel was adapted for television as part of ITV's Agatha Christie's Poirot, and was first aired in the UK on 5 January 1992. It stars David Suchet as Hercule Poirot, Hugh Fraser as Captain Hastings, and Philip Jackson as Chief Inspector Japp, with its guest stars including Donald Sumpter as Alexander Bonaparte Cust, Donald Douglas as Franklin Clarke, Nicholas Farrell as Donald Fraser, and Pippa Guard as Megan Barnard.

The adaptation, while mostly faithful to the novel's plot, has a number of minor changes:

- The characters of Inspector Crome, Dr Thompson, Lily Marbury and Tom Hartigan are omitted.
- Police are alerted to Cust's suspected involvement with the murders through his landlady, while the knife used in the fourth murder is found in his room.
- Franklin Clarke attempts to escape when he is exposed by Poirot as the killer.

Meitantei Akafuji Takashi (2005)

This Japanese adaptation aired as the first night of a two-night release in December 2005. The second night was an adaptation of The Murder on the Links. The show stars Shirō Itō as Takashi Akafuji, who represents the character of Poirot.

Les Petits Meurtres d'Agatha Christie (2009)

The first aired episode of the French television series Les Petits Meurtres d'Agatha Christie was an adaptation of The A.B.C. Murders. The episode aired in January 2009.

BBC's The ABC Murders (2018)

In 2018, an adaptation of the novel, written by Sarah Phelps, was filmed for the BBC. It was aired as a three-part miniseries over three consecutive days from 26 December that year. It stars John Malkovich as Hercule Poirot and Rupert Grint as Inspector Crome, with guest stars including Eamon Farren as Alexander Bonaparte Cust, Jack Farthing as Donald Fraser, Freya Mavor as Thora Grey, Kevin McNally as Inspector Japp, and Anya Chalotra as Lily Marbury.

This adaptation only loosely follows the novel's plot, and features considerable changes to both story and character:

- Captain Hastings is omitted from the plot.
- Japp dies from a heart attack at the start, leaving the investigation to be solely conducted by Inspector Crome.
- Poirot's background is explored prior to the outbreak of the First World War; in this adaptation, he was a priest before the conflict rather than a detective in the Belgian police force.
- Instead of his literary counterpart's social affluence and high public regard, Poirot has fallen out of favour with the general populace, and is treated with scorn by the police.
- The first three murders are committed in locations that have some relevance to Poirot; he helped deliver a baby when on a refugee train that stopped in Andover, visited the café where Betty Barnard would later work on a visit to Bexhill, and attended a party at the Clarke house.
- Poirot is on friendly terms with the Clarke family. In the book he was unacquainted with them prior to the murders.
- More care is taken in planning the D murder; rather than just stabbing a person in a cinema, reasoning that someone with a suitable name would be nearby, the killer intends to murder a ventriloquist at a theatre, but kills another performer on the theatre bill who shares the same dressing room.
- A fifth murder is conducted pertaining to the letter E and Cust is present at the scene. The killer is surprised by this and takes this opportunity to implicate Cust by planting the weapon when Cust has a fit.
- Cust is pursued by police shortly after murder E. He is caught after he injures himself, rather than passing out at a police station.
- There is no reference to Mary Drower, Alice Ascher's niece, within the plot. Thora Grey's character is changed to being manipulated into being Franklin's accomplice by establishing an alibi for him in one of the murders.
- Franklin claims, prior to his execution, that he committed the crimes to give Poirot a new cause to live for, considering them friends, although Poirot has nothing but disdain for the man's methods.

=== Anime ===
A four-part episode of the anime Agatha Christie's Great Detectives: Poirot and Marple is based on the book.

The A.B.C. Murders are also an arc of the anime "Hyouka", or episode 15 "The Jūmonji Case".

=== Manga ===
'ABC Satsujin Jiken' (ABC殺人事件, The ABC Murders) is a two-volume manga by Yasushi Hoshino, set in Japan, loosely based on a mixture of the original novel and Murder in the Mews. Poirot retains his iconic appearance, though is renamed Eikubo, while Hastings is renamed Asakura.

=== Video games ===
In 2009, DreamCatcher Interactive released a video game version of the novel for the Nintendo DS titled Agatha Christie: The ABC Murders. The game has players control Captain Hastings and must solve the mystery by inspecting crime scenes and questioning suspects. To appeal to players familiar with the original story, the game also offers the option to play with a different murderer, which results in different clues and testimony throughout the entire game. The game received mediocre reviews, but was commended for its faithful recreation of the source material.

In 2016, a game titled Agatha Christie: The ABC Murders was released by Microids for PC, PS4 and Xbox One.

== Publication history ==
- 1936, Collins Crime Club (London), 6 January 1936, hardcover, 256 pp
- 1936, Dodd Mead and Company (New York), 14 February 1936, hardcover, 306 pp
- 1941, Pocket Books (New York), paperback (Pocket number 88)
- 1948, Penguin Books, paperback, (Penguin number 683), 224 pp
- 1958, Pan Books, paperback (Great Pan 95), 191 pp
- 1962, Fontana Books (imprint of HarperCollins), paperback, 192 pp
- 1976, Greenway edition of collected works (William Collins), hardcover, 251 pp; ISBN 0-00-231014-7
- 1978, Greenway edition of collected works (Dodd Mead), hardcover, 251 pp
- 1979, Pan Books, Paperback, 191 pp
- 1980, Collins Crime Club (London), Golden Jubilee of Crime Club with introduction by Julian Symons, hardcover, 224 pp; ISBN 0-00-231323-5
- 1980, Ulverscroft large-print edition, hardback; ISBN 0-7089-0590-0
- 2006, Poirot Facsimile Edition (facsimile of 1936 UK first edition), HarperCollins, 4 September 2006, hardcover; ISBN 0-00-723443-0

The first true publication of The A.B.C. Murders occurred in the US, when an abridged version appeared in the November 1935 (Volume XCIX, Number 5) issue of Cosmopolitan magazine with illustrations by Frederic Mizen.

The UK serialisation was in 16 parts in the Daily Express from Monday 28 November to Thursday 12 December 1935. All the instalments carried an illustration by Steven Spurrier. This version did not contain any chapter divisions and totally omitted the foreword as well as chapters 26, 32 and 35; in addition, most of chapters seven and 20 were missing. Combined with other abridgements, this serialisation omitted almost 40% of the text of the published novel.
