= Agatha Christie: The ABC Murders (2016 video game) =

- Developer: Artefacts Studio
- Publisher: Anuman / Kalypso
- Series: Agatha Christie
- Engine: Unity
- Platforms: Microsoft Windows; Xbox One; PlayStation 4; macOS; Linux; Nintendo Switch; Android
- Release: Windows, Linux, OS X: NA: February 4, 2016; EU: February 5, 2016; PlayStation 4, Xbox One: EU: February 4, 2016; NA: February 23, 2016; Android: EU: September 29, 2016; Nintendo Switch: WW: October 6, 2020
- Genre: Adventure
- Mode: Single-player

Agatha Christie: The ABC Murders is a point-and-click adventure mystery video game developed by Artefacts Studio and published by Anuman under their Microïds brand for Microsoft Windows, Linux, Mac OS X, PlayStation 4 and Xbox One in February 2016. It was later released for Nintendo Switch in October 2020.

== Differences from the novel ==
The game retains the main plot from the novel, The A.B.C. Murders, and also the murderer's identity. However, there are some changes, like the number of victims, which are now only three, as the fourth planned victim (here a man called Dick Dunbar, owner of the Black Swan hotel) is saved by Poirot. In the game, all victims are related, as Alice Archer and Betty Bernard (together with Cust and Dunbar) are former patients of Sir Carmichael Clarke (who is a doctor in the game). The finding of the burnt patient files by Poirot at Combeside, and the recovery of these files, allows Poirot to discover the next victim's identity and prevent the murder (this clue also gives players a strong hint about who the real murderer is, even if it's not necessary to know it to finish the game). There are two endings in the game, depending on whether Poirot loads his gun with real bullets or blanks, before handing it to Hastings just prior to the final meeting.

== Reception ==
The game was met with a mixed reception.

Reception

Aggregate scores
Aggregator	Score
Metacritic	(PS4) 67/100 (XONE) 66/100 (NS) 69/100
OpenCritic	66/100

== Legacy ==
Microids would follow The ABC Murders with a number of other Hercule Poirot video games including Hercule Poirot: The First Cases (2021), Hercule Poirot: The London Case (2023), Murder on the Orient Express (2023) and Death on the Nile (2025).

== See also ==
- Yesterday Origins
