= Agatha Christie: The ABC Murders (2009 video game) =

2009 video game

- NTSC-U cover art
- Developer: AWE Games/Black Lantern Studios
- Publisher: DreamCatcher Interactive
- Director: Matt Raithel
- Programmer: Ankur Sharma
- Artist: Gary Bedell
- Composer: Nathan Lee
- Engine: Unity
- Platform: Nintendo DS
- Release: November 12, 2009
- Genre: Point-and-click
- Mode: Single-player

Agatha Christie: The ABC Murders is a 2009 mystery adventure game for the Nintendo DS, based on Agatha Christie's 1936 novel The ABC Murders. The game was co-developed by American companies AWE Games and Black Lantern Studios, and published by DreamCatcher Interactive.

== Gameplay ==
The game follows Hercule Poirot and Captain Hastings as they solve mysteries by inspecting crime scenes and questioning suspects. In order to appeal to players familiar with the original story, the game also offers the option to play with a different murderer, which results in different clues and testimony throughout the entire game.

== Reception ==
Reception

Aggregate scores
Aggregator	Score
GameRankings	53.82%
Metacritic	53/100

Review scores
Publication	Score
Adventure Gamers	1/5
GameZone	6/10
Nintendo Life	6/10
Official Nintendo Magazine	61%
VideoGamer.com	6/10

The game was met with a poor reception, as GameRankings gave it a score of 53.82%, while Metacritic gave it 53 out of 100.
