= List of listed buildings in Inverarity, Angus =

This is a list of listed buildings in the parish of Inverarity in Angus, Scotland.

== List ==
Name	Location	Date Listed	Grid Ref. (Note: Sometimes known as OSGB36, the grid reference (where provided) is based on the British national grid reference system used by the Ordnance Survey. • "Guide to National Grid". Ordnance Survey. • "Get-a-map". Ordnance Survey.)	Geo-coordinates	Notes	LB Number (Note: Historic Environment Scotland assign a unique alphanumeric identifier to each designated site in Scotland, for listed buildings this always begins with "LB", for example "LB12345".)	Image
Fothringham - Bridge Over Kerbet Burn				56°35′01″N 2°53′02″W	Category C(S)	10999	Upload Photo
Fothringham-Ice-House				56°34′42″N 2°52′54″W	Category C(S)	11000	Upload Photo
Meathie Graveyard				56°36′18″N 2°52′21″W	Category B	11003	Upload Photo
Loanfoot Cottages 2, Kincaldrum				56°35′19″N 2°55′24″W	Category B	11007	Upload Photo
Fothringham - South Lodge				56°34′35″N 2°52′47″W	Category B	10992	Upload Photo
Fothringham House				56°35′24″N 2°52′37″W	Category C(S)	10995	Upload Photo
Holemill - Old Corn Mill				56°35′33″N 3°02′35″W	Category B	11008	Upload Photo
Inverarity Parish Kirk				56°35′16″N 2°53′33″W	Category B	10993	Upload another image See more images
Parish Kirk Manse				56°35′22″N 2°53′38″W	Category B	10994	Upload Photo
Fothringham - Doocot				56°35′08″N 2°53′01″W	Category B	10997	Upload another image
Easter Meathie - Sundial				56°36′30″N 2°52′29″W	Category C(S)	11004	Upload Photo
Kincaldrum House Doocot				56°35′35″N 2°55′36″W	Category B	11005	Upload Photo
Holemill Bridge Over Kerbet Burn				56°34′56″N 2°50′38″W	Category B	10988	Upload Photo
Fothringham Stables				56°35′07″N 2°52′57″W	Category C(S)	10996	Upload Photo
Fothringham - Home Farm Cottages				56°35′17″N 2°52′58″W	Category C(S)	10998	Upload Photo
Old Invereighty Bridge Over Kerbet Water				56°35′44″N 2°54′36″W	Category C(S)	11001	Upload another image
Meathie Church (On Easter Meathie Farm)				56°36′18″N 2°52′21″W	Category B	11002	Upload Photo
Loanfoot Cottages 1, Kincaldrum				56°35′19″N 2°55′25″W	Category B	11006	Upload Photo
Kirkbuddo Old Graveyard				56°34′43″N 2°49′35″W	Category C(S)	10989	Upload Photo
Fothringham-Mid-Lodge				56°35′14″N 2°53′07″W	Category B	10990	Upload another image
"The Hostel" South Tarbrax				56°33′39″N 2°55′36″W	Category B	10991	Upload Photo

== Key ==
The scheme for classifying buildings in Scotland is:

- Category A: "buildings of national or international importance, either architectural or historic; or fine, little-altered examples of some particular period, style or building type."
- Category B: "buildings of regional or more than local importance; or major examples of some particular period, style or building type, which may have been altered."
- Category C: "buildings of local importance; lesser examples of any period, style, or building type, as originally constructed or moderately altered; and simple traditional buildings which group well with other listed buildings."

In March 2016 there were 47,288 listed buildings in Scotland. Of these, 8% were Category A, and 50% were Category B, with the remaining 42% being Category C.

== See also ==
- List of listed buildings in Angus
