= List of listed buildings in Aberlemno, Angus =

This is a list of listed buildings in the parish of Aberlemno in Angus, Scotland.

== List ==
Name	Location	Date Listed	Grid Ref. (Note: Sometimes known as OSGB36, the grid reference (where provided) is based on the British national grid reference system used by the Ordnance Survey. • "Guide to National Grid". Ordnance Survey. • "Get-a-map". Ordnance Survey.)	Geo-coordinates	Notes	LB Number (Note: Historic Environment Scotland assign a unique alphanumeric identifier to each designated site in Scotland, for listed buildings this always begins with "LB", for example "LB12345".)	Image
Auldbar - West Lodge				56°42′58″N 2°41′57″W	Category C(S)	4938	Upload another image See more images
West Milldens Cottage				56°38′41″N 2°44′33″W	Category B	4945	Upload Photo
Melgund Castle				56°41′47″N 2°44′34″W	Category A	4931	Upload another image
Balglassie House Including Garden Walls With Bee-Boles				56°42′30″N 2°45′21″W	Category C(S)	4933	Upload another image
Hillbarns Farmhouse				56°42′09″N 2°45′45″W	Category B	4934	Upload another image
Kirkton Farm - Old Schoolhouse				56°41′21″N 2°46′54″W	Category C(S)	4952	Upload Photo
Auldbar Road, Balgavies, (Former Station House) Including Stables, Signal Box, Platform, External Staircase, Railings And Retaining Wall				56°38′53″N 2°45′24″W	Category C(S)	48696	Upload another image See more images
Woodrae - Doocot				56°41′57″N 2°47′24″W	Category B	4928	Upload Photo
Balgavies Castle				56°39′14″N 2°45′09″W	Category B	4940	Upload Photo
West Milldens Bridge Over Lunan Water				56°38′41″N 2°44′35″W	Category B	4944	Upload Photo
Parish Kirk Manse, Including Garden Walls, Gardenhouse With Dovecot				56°41′23″N 2°46′50″W	Category B	4949	Upload Photo
Balgavies House				56°39′05″N 2°44′57″W	Category B	4941	Upload Photo
Carsgownie Farmhouse				56°40′55″N 2°48′48″W	Category B	4954	Upload Photo
Carsgownie - Walled Garden				56°40′54″N 2°48′48″W	Category C(S)	4955	Upload Photo
Flemington Farmhouse				56°41′26″N 2°46′31″W	Category B	5120	Upload Photo
Carsgownie - Entrance Gates				56°40′44″N 2°48′35″W	Category B	4923	Upload Photo
Melgund - Gatepier (2)				56°41′49″N 2°44′35″W	Category C(S)	4932	Upload Photo
Hillbarns Farm Barn				56°42′10″N 2°45′43″W	Category C(S)	4936	Upload Photo
Quarry Park Cottage, Balgavies				56°39′26″N 2°45′53″W	Category B	4946	Upload Photo
Kirkton Farmhouse				56°41′20″N 2°46′56″W	Category C(S)	4951	Upload Photo
Aberlemno Bridge Over Henwell Burn				56°41′20″N 2°46′51″W	Category C(S)	4953	Upload Photo
Flemington Symbol Stone				56°41′23″N 2°46′43″W	Category B	4926	Upload Photo
Aberlemno Parish Kirk				56°41′21″N 2°46′52″W	Category C(S)	4947	Upload another image
Parish Kirkyard				56°41′22″N 2°46′52″W	Category B	4948	Upload another image
Flemington Castle				56°41′24″N 2°46′31″W	Category B	5119	Upload Photo
Tillywhanland Farmhouse				56°40′31″N 2°46′26″W	Category B	4924	Upload Photo
Balbinny - Doocot				56°41′56″N 2°46′44″W	Category B	4929	Upload Photo
Melgund - Gatepier (1)				56°41′49″N 2°44′35″W	Category C(S)	4930	Upload Photo
Auldbar - Chapel				56°42′49″N 2°41′56″W	Category C(S)	4937	Upload Photo
Balgavies - Doocot				56°38′57″N 2°44′57″W	Category B	4942	Upload Photo
Crosston Farmhouse				56°41′36″N 2°46′49″W	Category C(S)	4927	Upload Photo
Auldbar - Bridge				56°42′42″N 2°41′48″W	Category C(S)	4935	Upload Photo
Blaikie Mill Farmhouse				56°43′03″N 2°41′58″W	Category C(S)	4939	Upload another image
West Milldens Cornmill				56°38′41″N 2°44′36″W	Category B	4943	Upload Photo

== Key ==
The scheme for classifying buildings in Scotland is:

- Category A: "buildings of national or international importance, either architectural or historic; or fine, little-altered examples of some particular period, style or building type."
- Category B: "buildings of regional or more than local importance; or major examples of some particular period, style or building type, which may have been altered."
- Category C: "buildings of local importance; lesser examples of any period, style, or building type, as originally constructed or moderately altered; and simple traditional buildings which group well with other listed buildings."

In March 2016 there were 47,288 listed buildings in Scotland. Of these, 8% were Category A, and 50% were Category B, with the remaining 42% being Category C.

== See also ==
- List of listed buildings in Angus
