= List of listed buildings in Kinnell, Angus =

This is a list of listed buildings in the parish of Kinnell in Angus, Scotland.

== List ==
Name	Location	Date Listed	Grid Ref. (Note: Sometimes known as OSGB36, the grid reference (where provided) is based on the British national grid reference system used by the Ordnance Survey. • "Guide to National Grid". Ordnance Survey. • "Get-a-map". Ordnance Survey.)	Geo-coordinates	Notes	LB Number (Note: Historic Environment Scotland assign a unique alphanumeric identifier to each designated site in Scotland, for listed buildings this always begins with "LB", for example "LB12345".)	Image
Old Schoolhouse, Muirside Of Kinnell				56°39′35″N 2°38′43″W	Category C(S)	12324	Upload Photo
Willanyards Farmhouse				56°40′13″N 2°36′47″W	Category B	12326	Upload Photo
Former Kinnell Parish Church Graveyard Including Gatepiers, Gates And Enclosure Walls				56°38′34″N 2°38′22″W	Category C(S)	51307	Upload Photo
Kinnells Mill - Gate Piers				56°38′30″N 2°38′34″W	Category B	12322	Upload Photo
Kinnells Mill - Granary And Cottages				56°38′31″N 2°38′36″W	Category B	12323	Upload Photo
Kinnells Mill Bridge Over Lunan Water				56°38′28″N 2°38′38″W	Category B	13815	Upload Photo
Kinnells Mill Farmhouse				56°38′30″N 2°38′44″W	Category B	12321	Upload Photo
Braikie Castle				56°38′54″N 2°36′27″W	Category A	12325	Upload another image

== Key ==
The scheme for classifying buildings in Scotland is:

- Category A: "buildings of national or international importance, either architectural or historic; or fine, little-altered examples of some particular period, style or building type."
- Category B: "buildings of regional or more than local importance; or major examples of some particular period, style or building type, which may have been altered."
- Category C: "buildings of local importance; lesser examples of any period, style, or building type, as originally constructed or moderately altered; and simple traditional buildings which group well with other listed buildings."

In March 2016 there were 47,288 listed buildings in Scotland. Of these, 8% were Category A, and 50% were Category B, with the remaining 42% being Category C.

== See also ==
- List of listed buildings in Angus
