= List of listed buildings in Monifieth, Angus =

This is a list of listed buildings in the parish of Monifieth in Angus, Scotland.

== List ==
Name	Location	Date Listed	Grid Ref. (Note: Sometimes known as OSGB36, the grid reference (where provided) is based on the British national grid reference system used by the Ordnance Survey. • "Guide to National Grid". Ordnance Survey. • "Get-a-map". Ordnance Survey.)	Geo-coordinates	Notes	LB Number (Note: Historic Environment Scotland assign a unique alphanumeric identifier to each designated site in Scotland, for listed buildings this always begins with "LB", for example "LB12345".)	Image
62 Hill Street, Viewfirth				56°29′00″N 2°49′03″W	Category C(S)	37971	Upload Photo
Victoria Street, Ashlea, With 2 Sets Of Gatepiers And Wall And Enclosing Wall To North And East				56°28′57″N 2°49′16″W	Category C(S)	37981	Upload Photo
Kingennie, Kingennie House				56°30′26″N 2°51′04″W	Category B	17463	Upload Photo
Laws Hill, 'Bone-House'				56°30′13″N 2°49′39″W	Category B	17465	Upload Photo
Church Street, St Rule's Parish Church With Churchyard				56°28′50″N 2°49′16″W	Category B	37955	Upload Photo
Hill Street, Lamp Standard At No 10				56°28′49″N 2°49′24″W	Category B	37966	Upload Photo
Hill Street, Seaview, Including Balustrade, Terrace Wall And Garden Wall With Gatepiers				56°28′55″N 2°49′20″W	Category B	37968	Upload Photo
20 Union Street, Station House				56°28′47″N 2°49′07″W	Category B	37979	Upload Photo
Union Street, Monifieth Station, Footbridge Over Railway				56°28′48″N 2°49′03″W	Category C(S)	37980	Upload Photo
Victoria Street, Ashludie, Walled Garden And Conservatory				56°29′20″N 2°49′24″W	Category B	37985	Upload Photo
Former Monifieth North (Hillock) Church With Gatepiers And Walls				56°29′52″N 2°51′32″W	Category B	17468	Upload Photo
South Grange Farm, Horse Mill				56°29′13″N 2°50′01″W	Category C(S)	17469	Upload Photo
Wellbank, Wellbank Farm House				56°31′33″N 2°52′11″W	Category B	17470	Upload Photo
Drumsturdy Road, Cunmont Cottages West				56°30′34″N 2°49′40″W	Category B	17481	Upload Photo
76 Hill Street, Greenbourne				56°29′05″N 2°48′55″W	Category B	37972	Upload Photo
Ferry Road, Grange Works (Former Milton Tram Depot)				56°28′36″N 2°50′02″W	Category B	37958	Upload Photo
Grange Road, 1 And 2 Paradise Cottages, Boundary Wall At North				56°28′54″N 2°50′01″W	Category B	37961	Upload Photo
Grange Road, The Grange Lodge, Including Gatepiers				56°29′06″N 2°49′57″W	Category C(S)	37963	Upload Photo
High Street, Holy Trinity Episcopal Church With Enclosing Wall And Gates				56°29′02″N 2°48′55″W	Category B	37964	Upload Photo
Queen Street, Tighnduin				56°28′55″N 2°49′30″W	Category B	37978	Upload Photo
4 Victoria Street, Tigh-Na-Muirn, Motor House, Game Larder, Lamp Standard, Enclosing Walls At North, South, East And West, And Gatepiers At Victoria Street				56°29′00″N 2°49′16″W	Category B	37982	Upload Photo
Victoria Street, Ashludie Stable Court				56°29′21″N 2°49′20″W	Category C(S)	37984	Upload Photo
Laws Hill, Lodge And Gatepiers To Demolished Laws House				56°30′09″N 2°49′35″W	Category B	19802	Upload Photo
Laws Hill, Stable Court To Demolished Laws House				56°30′13″N 2°49′51″W	Category B	17466	Upload Photo
Albert Street, Railway Footbridge				56°28′43″N 2°49′26″W	Category B	37954	Upload Photo
Church Street, Former Manse				56°28′52″N 2°49′16″W	Category B	37956	Upload Photo
Church Street, Gerard Hall				56°28′49″N 2°49′14″W	Category B	37957	Upload Photo
Ferry Road, Milton Mill				56°28′37″N 2°50′03″W	Category B	37959	Upload Photo
Grange Road, Milton House Hotel				56°28′49″N 2°50′01″W	Category B	37960	Upload Photo
Hill Street, Lamp Standard At No 50				56°28′58″N 2°49′08″W	Category B	37970	Upload Photo
Maule Street, Invertay House, Former Invertay Primary School And School House				56°28′49″N 2°49′10″W	Category B	37974	Upload Photo
Princes Street, Ladies' Panmure Golf Club				56°28′55″N 2°48′47″W	Category B	37977	Upload Photo
Victoria Street, Ashludie With Enclosing Wall To Victoria Street				56°29′20″N 2°49′16″W	Category B	37983	Upload Photo
Hill Street, South Church				56°28′52″N 2°49′22″W	Category C(S)	37967	Upload Photo
50 Hill Street				56°28′58″N 2°49′08″W	Category C(S)	37969	Upload Photo
Maule Street, War Memorial				56°28′46″N 2°49′26″W	Category B	37973	Upload another image
Monifieth Golf Course Starters Box At Medal Course, Near Panmure Hotel				56°28′53″N 2°48′41″W	Category C(S)	37975	Upload Photo
Panmurefield Road, Lamp Standard At No 5				56°28′38″N 2°50′18″W	Category B	37976	Upload Photo
Kingennie, Kingennie House, The Gardens				56°30′23″N 2°51′14″W	Category C(S)	17464	Upload Photo
Laws Hill, Laws Farm Granary And Yard				56°30′18″N 2°49′34″W	Category B	17467	Upload Photo
Drumsturdy Road, The Harrow's, Omachie Lodge West				56°30′23″N 2°50′40″W	Category C(S)	17483	Upload Photo
4 Hill Street With Wall And Gatepiers, And Similar Wall And Gatepiers Leading To Maule Street				56°28′48″N 2°49′25″W	Category C(S)	37965	Upload Photo
Victoria Street, Ashludie, South Lodge And Gatepiers				56°29′14″N 2°49′25″W	Category C(S)	37986	Upload Photo
Drumsturdy Road, Linlathen North Lodge, Linlathen				56°29′40″N 2°52′33″W	Category C(S)	17461	Upload Photo
Kincordie House Including Coach House And Wall, Former Monifieth North (Hillock) Manse				56°29′53″N 2°51′30″W	Category C(S)	17462	Upload Photo
Drumsturdy Road, Laws Lodge And Gatepiers				56°30′22″N 2°50′38″W	Category C(S)	17482	Upload Photo
The Grange With Gatepiers				56°29′09″N 2°49′51″W	Category C(S)	37962	Upload Photo

== Key ==
The scheme for classifying buildings in Scotland is:

- Category A: "buildings of national or international importance, either architectural or historic; or fine, little-altered examples of some particular period, style or building type."
- Category B: "buildings of regional or more than local importance; or major examples of some particular period, style or building type, which may have been altered."
- Category C: "buildings of local importance; lesser examples of any period, style, or building type, as originally constructed or moderately altered; and simple traditional buildings which group well with other listed buildings."

In March 2016 there were 47,288 listed buildings in Scotland. Of these, 8% were Category A, and 50% were Category B, with the remaining 42% being Category C.

== See also ==
- List of listed buildings in Angus
