= List of listed buildings in Panbride, Angus =

This is a list of listed buildings in the parish of Panbride in Angus, Scotland.

== List ==
Name	Location	Date Listed	Grid Ref. (Note: Sometimes known as OSGB36, the grid reference (where provided) is based on the British national grid reference system used by the Ordnance Survey. • "Guide to National Grid". Ordnance Survey. • "Get-a-map". Ordnance Survey.)	Geo-coordinates	Notes	LB Number (Note: Historic Environment Scotland assign a unique alphanumeric identifier to each designated site in Scotland, for listed buildings this always begins with "LB", for example "LB12345".)	Image
Panmure Estate Margaret's Mount				56°32′12″N 2°44′37″W	Category B	18420	Upload Photo
Panmure Estate - The East Gate				56°32′21″N 2°44′28″W	Category B	18421	Upload Photo
Hatton House - Doocot				56°31′29″N 2°40′07″W	Category B	18425	Upload Photo
Craigmill Bridge Over Craigmill Burn				56°30′48″N 2°41′33″W	Category B	19879	Upload Photo
Panbride Parish Kirk				56°30′44″N 2°41′53″W	Category C(S)	18434	Upload another image See more images
Panmure Estate - Gazebo, Corrieara Den (1)				56°32′01″N 2°45′40″W	Category B	18414	Upload Photo
Panmure Estate - The West Gate				56°32′08″N 2°45′52″W	Category A	18418	Upload Photo
Panmure Estate - Commemorative Column				56°32′25″N 2°45′13″W	Category A	18419	Upload another image
Parish School House				56°30′44″N 2°41′55″W	Category B	18437	Upload Photo
Panmure Castle - Bridge Over Monikie Burn				56°32′02″N 2°45′26″W	Category B	18412	Upload Photo
Panbride Burial Aisle				56°30′45″N 2°41′52″W	Category B	18435	Upload Photo
Panmure Estate - Former Stables And Service Court				56°32′13″N 2°45′11″W	Category B	49308	Upload Photo
Panmure Estate - Artificial Ruins				56°31′42″N 2°47′19″W	Category B	19877	Upload Photo
Panmure Castle				56°31′44″N 2°44′31″W	Category B	18411	Upload Photo
Panmure Estate - Montague Bridge Over Monikie Burn				56°32′07″N 2°45′47″W	Category B	18416	Upload Photo
Panbride House				56°30′29″N 2°41′10″W	Category B	18422	Upload Photo
Hatton Farmhouse				56°31′36″N 2°40′08″W	Category B	18426	Upload Photo
Pitlivie Farmhouse				56°32′08″N 2°43′43″W	Category C(S)	19148	Upload Photo
Panmure Estate - Gardener's House				56°31′44″N 2°44′45″W	Category B	18413	Upload Photo
Panmure Estate - Gazebo, Corrieara Den (2)				56°32′03″N 2°45′26″W	Category B	18415	Upload Photo
Panbride House - Stables				56°30′30″N 2°41′11″W	Category B	18423	Upload Photo
Hatton House				56°31′26″N 2°40′08″W	Category B	18424	Upload Photo
Loupin'-On-Stane, Parish Kirk, Courtyard				56°30′46″N 2°41′53″W	Category B	18436	Upload Photo

== Key ==
The scheme for classifying buildings in Scotland is:

- Category A: "buildings of national or international importance, either architectural or historic; or fine, little-altered examples of some particular period, style or building type."
- Category B: "buildings of regional or more than local importance; or major examples of some particular period, style or building type, which may have been altered."
- Category C: "buildings of local importance; lesser examples of any period, style, or building type, as originally constructed or moderately altered; and simple traditional buildings which group well with other listed buildings."

In March 2016 there were 47,288 listed buildings in Scotland. Of these, 8% were Category A, and 50% were Category B, with the remaining 42% being Category C.

== See also ==
- List of listed buildings in Angus
