= List of listed buildings in Mains And Strathmartine, Angus =

This is a list of listed buildings in the parish of Mains And Strathmartine in Angus, Scotland.

== List ==
Name	Location	Date Listed	Grid Ref. (Note: Sometimes known as OSGB36, the grid reference (where provided) is based on the British national grid reference system used by the Ordnance Survey. • "Guide to National Grid". Ordnance Survey. • "Get-a-map". Ordnance Survey.)	Geo-coordinates	Notes	LB Number (Note: Historic Environment Scotland assign a unique alphanumeric identifier to each designated site in Scotland, for listed buildings this always begins with "LB", for example "LB12345".)	Image
Balmuir, Balmuir House, Walled Kitchen Garden				56°29′48″N 2°58′32″W	Category B	19032	Upload Photo
Baldovan, Baldovan House, West Lodge, Including Gatepiers And Adjoining Walls				56°29′57″N 2°59′41″W	Category C(S)	18702	Upload Photo
Balmuir, Balmuirfield House, Lodge, Including Adjoining Road Bridge Over Dichty Water				56°29′41″N 2°58′44″W	Category B	19035	Upload Photo
Balmuir, Balmuirfield House, Mill, Including Wheel And Sluice				56°29′41″N 2°58′47″W	Category B	19036	Upload Photo
Kirkton Of Strathmartine, Old Graveyard				56°30′19″N 3°00′42″W	Category B	19042	Upload Photo
Strathmartine Castle, Tower At Rear Of Farmhouse				56°30′55″N 3°01′24″W	Category B	19052	Upload Photo
Craigmill Road, Road Bridge Over Dichty Water				56°29′54″N 2°59′42″W	Category B	19087	Upload Photo
Baldovan, Strathmartine Hospital, Former Baldovan Institute				56°30′13″N 2°59′52″W	Category B	48113	Upload Photo
Kirkton Of Strathmartine, Craigmount House, Including Game Larder				56°30′40″N 3°00′53″W	Category B	19041	Upload Photo
Baldovan, Baldovan House				56°30′06″N 2°59′07″W	Category B	18700	Upload Photo
Balmuir, Balmuir House, Including Adjoining Walled Garden				56°29′51″N 2°58′22″W	Category B	19027	Upload Photo
Balmuir, Balmuirfield House				56°29′42″N 2°58′50″W	Category B	19033	Upload Photo
Balmuir, Road Bridge Over Dichty Water				56°29′43″N 2°58′34″W	Category B	19038	Upload Photo
Kirkton Of Strathmartine, Westlands, Including Boundary Walls				56°30′31″N 3°00′50″W	Category B	19045	Upload Photo
North Auchray Farmhouse, Including Enclosing Walls				56°30′20″N 3°02′28″W	Category B	19046	Upload Photo
Baldovan, Craigmill Road, Lodge To Former Baldovan_Institute, Including Boundary Wall And Gatepiers				56°30′11″N 3°00′01″W	Category B	18703	Upload Photo
Balmuir, Balmuir House, Dovecot				56°29′57″N 2°58′25″W	Category B	19029	Upload Photo
Kirkton Of Strathmartine, Strathmartine War Memorial				56°30′17″N 3°00′51″W	Category C(S)	19044	Upload Photo
Rosemill, Rosemill Cottage, Dovecot				56°30′28″N 3°01′54″W	Category B	19048	Upload Photo
Balmuir, Balmuir House, Coach House/.Stables				56°29′53″N 2°58′27″W	Category C(S)	19028	Upload Photo
Balmuir, Balmuirfield House, Coach House				56°29′42″N 2°58′47″W	Category C(S)	19034	Upload Photo
Balmuir, Balmuirfield House, Road Bridge Over Lade				56°29′42″N 2°58′44″W	Category C(S)	19037	Upload Photo
Craigmill Road, Craigmill House, Including Stable Court, Gatepiers And Boundary Walls				56°30′19″N 3°00′28″W	Category B	19039	Upload Photo
'Teach Feirme', Hillhouses, Farmhouse Including Boundary Walls				56°30′40″N 3°00′09″W	Category B	19040	Upload Photo
Old Baldragon Farmhouse, Including Steading				56°30′09″N 3°00′30″W	Category B	19047	Upload Photo
Strathmartine Castle, Farmhouse, Including Gatepiers And Adjoining Walls				56°30′52″N 3°01′27″W	Category B	19051	Upload Photo
Baldovan, Baldovan House, Walled Garden				56°30′02″N 2°58′54″W	Category B	19903	Upload Photo
Rose Mill, Former Dundee And Newtyle Railway Bridge Over Dichty Water (1)				56°30′29″N 3°02′26″W	Category B	19480	Upload Photo
Balmuir, Balmuir House, Garage Cottage				56°29′53″N 2°58′27″W	Category C(S)	19030	Upload Photo
Balmuir, Balmuir House, Old Stable, Including Loupin On Stane, Gatepiers And Kennels				56°29′52″N 2°58′25″W	Category B	19031	Upload Photo
Rosemill, Rosemill Cottage, Old Cottage				56°30′28″N 3°01′54″W	Category C(S)	19049	Upload Photo
Baldovan, Baldovan House, East Lodge, Including Gatepiers And Adjoining Wall				56°30′03″N 2°58′50″W	Category C(S)	18701	Upload Photo
Kirkton Of Strathmartine, Road Bridge Over Dichty Water				56°30′20″N 3°00′50″W	Category B	19043	Upload Photo
Rosemill, Tilehouses, East Cottage				56°30′34″N 3°01′58″W	Category C(S)	19050	Upload Photo

== Key ==
The scheme for classifying buildings in Scotland is:

- Category A: "buildings of national or international importance, either architectural or historic; or fine, little-altered examples of some particular period, style or building type."
- Category B: "buildings of regional or more than local importance; or major examples of some particular period, style or building type, which may have been altered."
- Category C: "buildings of local importance; lesser examples of any period, style, or building type, as originally constructed or moderately altered; and simple traditional buildings which group well with other listed buildings."

In March 2016 there were 47,288 listed buildings in Scotland. Of these, 8% were Category A, and 50% were Category B, with the remaining 42% being Category C.

== See also ==
- List of listed buildings in Angus
