= List of listed buildings in Kinnettles, Angus =

This is a list of listed buildings in the parish of Kinnettles in Angus, Scotland.

== List ==
Name	Location	Date Listed	Grid Ref. (Note: Sometimes known as OSGB36, the grid reference (where provided) is based on the British national grid reference system used by the Ordnance Survey. • "Guide to National Grid". Ordnance Survey. • "Get-a-map". Ordnance Survey.)	Geo-coordinates	Notes	LB Number (Note: Historic Environment Scotland assign a unique alphanumeric identifier to each designated site in Scotland, for listed buildings this always begins with "LB", for example "LB12345".)	Image
Brigton - Home Farmhouse				56°36′47″N 2°57′00″W	Category B	12078	Upload Photo
10,11,12,13,14,15 Douglastown "The Row"				56°36′52″N 2°57′10″W	Category C(S)	12039	Upload Photo
Douglastown Cottage (North Of The New Road)				56°36′55″N 2°57′15″W	Category C(S)	12041	Upload Photo
7,8,9 Douglastown Brigton Cottages				56°36′50″N 2°57′06″W	Category C(S)	13799	Upload Photo
Brigton - Stables				56°36′40″N 2°56′51″W	Category B	13801	Upload Photo
Brigton House				56°36′38″N 2°56′52″W	Category B	12074	Upload Photo
3,4,5,6 Douglastown				56°36′51″N 2°57′07″W	Category C(S)	12038	Upload Photo
Kirkton Cottages				56°36′29″N 2°56′39″W	Category B	12069	Upload Photo
Douglastown Bridge Over Kerbet Water				56°36′49″N 2°57′11″W	Category B	12042	Upload Photo
North Leckaway Steading				56°37′53″N 2°55′44″W	Category C(S)	12043	Upload Photo
Burnside Cottage West				56°36′08″N 2°55′47″W	Category C(S)	12044	Upload Photo
Kirkyard Walls				56°36′29″N 2°56′38″W	Category B	12067	Upload Photo
Brigton - Doocot				56°36′40″N 2°56′50″W	Category B	12075	Upload Photo
Douglastown House				56°36′53″N 2°57′13″W	Category C(S)	12036	Upload Photo
16 Douglastown (North Of Item 19)				56°36′53″N 2°57′11″W	Category C(S)	12040	Upload Photo
Burnside Bridge Over Kerbet Water				56°36′07″N 2°55′46″W	Category C(S)	12045	Upload another image
Kinnettles Parish Kirk				56°36′29″N 2°56′38″W	Category B	12066	Upload another image See more images
Kinnettles Mill				56°36′21″N 2°56′26″W	Category C(S)	12073	Upload Photo
Brigton - Sundial				56°36′36″N 2°56′54″W	Category B	12076	Upload Photo
Kinnettles Castle (Formerly Kinnettles House)				56°36′37″N 2°56′03″W	Category B	12070	Upload another image See more images
North Leckaway Farmhouse				56°37′52″N 2°55′43″W	Category B	13077	Upload Photo
Kinettles - Doocot				56°36′31″N 2°56′21″W	Category B	12072	Upload another image
Brigton - East Gates				56°36′33″N 2°56′42″W	Category B	12077	Upload Photo
Parish Kirk Manse - Now Kerbet House				56°36′27″N 2°56′36″W	Category B	12068	Upload another image
Kinettles - Monument				56°36′31″N 2°55′48″W	Category B	12071	Upload Photo
1-2 Douglastown				56°36′50″N 2°57′09″W	Category C(S)	12037	Upload Photo

== Key ==
The scheme for classifying buildings in Scotland is:

- Category A: "buildings of national or international importance, either architectural or historic; or fine, little-altered examples of some particular period, style or building type."
- Category B: "buildings of regional or more than local importance; or major examples of some particular period, style or building type, which may have been altered."
- Category C: "buildings of local importance; lesser examples of any period, style, or building type, as originally constructed or moderately altered; and simple traditional buildings which group well with other listed buildings."

In March 2016 there were 47,288 listed buildings in Scotland. Of these, 8% were Category A, and 50% were Category B, with the remaining 42% being Category C.

== See also ==
- List of listed buildings in Angus
