= List of listed buildings in Kirkden, Angus =

This is a list of listed buildings in the parish of Kirkden in Angus, Scotland.

== List ==
Name	Location	Date listed	Grid ref. (Note: Sometimes known as OSGB36, the grid reference (where provided) is based on the British national grid reference system used by the Ordnance Survey. • "Guide to National Grid". Ordnance Survey. • "Get-a-map". Ordnance Survey.)	Geo-coordinates	Notes	LB number (Note: Historic Environment Scotland assign a unique alphanumeric identifier to each designated site in Scotland, for listed buildings this always begins with "LB", for example "LB12345".)	Image
Burnside Cottage				56°38′14″N 2°41′47″W	Category B	11882	Upload Photo
Guthrie, East And West Damside Cottages				56°38′11″N 2°41′31″W	Category C(S)	11883	Upload Photo
Kirkden House, (Formerly Parish Kirk Manse)				56°37′33″N 2°45′56″W	Category C(S)	11912	Upload Photo
Gardyne Castle				56°37′44″N 2°41′47″W	Category A	11914	Upload Photo
Pitmuies - Home Farm				56°38′18″N 2°42′27″W	Category A	11875	Upload Photo
Pitmuies Bridge Over Vinny Water				56°38′12″N 2°42′22″W	Category C(S)	11877	Upload Photo
Gardyne Castle - West Gates				56°37′45″N 2°41′52″W	Category C(S)	11916	Upload Photo
Mains Of Gardyne Farmhouse				56°37′44″N 2°41′53″W	Category C(S)	11917	Upload Photo
Middleton House				56°37′41″N 2°40′52″W	Category B	11919	Upload Photo
Middleton - Gardener's Cottage				56°37′43″N 2°40′41″W	Category C(S)	11922	Upload Photo
Middleton - Home Farm				56°37′45″N 2°40′48″W	Category C(S)	11923	Upload Photo
Dumbarrow - Windmill Tower				56°36′49″N 2°44′10″W	Category B	13791	Upload Photo
Middleton - North Lodge Gates				56°38′08″N 2°41′04″W	Category C(S)	11871	Upload Photo
Pitmuies - Walled Garden Sundial, Seat And Gatepiers				56°38′15″N 2°42′28″W	Category B	11873	Upload Photo
Pitmuies - Doocot				56°38′14″N 2°42′27″W	Category B	11874	Upload another image
Hillhead Of Ascurry Farmhouse				56°36′09″N 2°45′38″W	Category C(S)	11884	Upload Photo
Dumbarrow - Mill Cottage				56°36′47″N 2°43′19″W	Category C(S)	11915	Upload Photo
Middleton - Sundial				56°37′40″N 2°40′54″W	Category B	11920	Upload Photo
Middleton - Garden House				56°37′41″N 2°40′49″W	Category C(S)	11921	Upload Photo
Pitmuies - Laundry				56°38′14″N 2°42′27″W	Category B	11876	Upload Photo
Pitmuies - East Gates				56°38′21″N 2°42′13″W	Category C(S)	11880	Upload Photo
Pitmuies - West Gates				56°38′24″N 2°42′43″W	Category C(S)	11881	Upload Photo
Middleton - South Lodge				56°37′28″N 2°40′33″W	Category C(S)	11869	Upload Photo
Pitmuies House				56°38′16″N 2°42′26″W	Category A	13076	Upload another image
Middleton - North Lodge				56°38′08″N 2°41′03″W	Category C(S)	11870	Upload Photo
Pitmuies - Over-Bridge				56°38′21″N 2°42′26″W	Category B	11878	Upload another image
Pitmuies - Upright Cross Slab				56°38′22″N 2°42′29″W	Category B	11879	Upload Photo
Idvieshill				56°36′51″N 2°45′13″W	Category C(S)	11913	Upload Photo
Middleton - "Vinny Cottage"				56°37′53″N 2°40′47″W	Category B	11867	Upload Photo
Middleton - Fingerhill Bridge Over Vinny Burn				56°37′57″N 2°40′59″W	Category B	11868	Upload Photo
Mains Of Gardyne Steading				56°37′42″N 2°41′54″W	Category C(S)	11918	Upload Photo
Friockheim & Kinnell Parish Church				56°38′14″N 2°40′05″W	Category C(S)	11872	Upload another image

== Key ==
The scheme for classifying buildings in Scotland is:

- Category A: "buildings of national or international importance, either architectural or historic; or fine, little-altered examples of some particular period, style or building type."
- Category B: "buildings of regional or more than local importance; or major examples of some particular period, style or building type, which may have been altered."
- Category C: "buildings of local importance; lesser examples of any period, style, or building type, as originally constructed or moderately altered; and simple traditional buildings which group well with other listed buildings."

In March 2016 there were 47,288 listed buildings in Scotland. Of these, 8% were Category A, and 50% were Category B, with the remaining 42% being Category C.

== See also ==
- List of listed buildings in Angus
