= List of listed buildings in Dun, Angus =

This is a list of listed buildings in the parish of Dun in Angus, Scotland.

== List ==
Name	Location	Date Listed	Grid Ref. (Note: Sometimes known as OSGB36, the grid reference (where provided) is based on the British national grid reference system used by the Ordnance Survey. • "Guide to National Grid". Ordnance Survey. • "Get-a-map". Ordnance Survey.)	Geo-coordinates	Notes	LB Number (Note: Historic Environment Scotland assign a unique alphanumeric identifier to each designated site in Scotland, for listed buildings this always begins with "LB", for example "LB12345".)	Image
Bridge Of Dun, K6 Telephone Kiosk, Opposite Railway Station				56°43′07″N 2°32′59″W	Category B	6387	Upload Photo
House Of Dun Walled Garden. Gateway To Old House Of Dun				56°43′48″N 2°32′45″W	Category B	4664	Upload Photo
Langley Park Walled Garden				56°44′04″N 2°31′07″W	Category C(S)	4681	Upload Photo
House Of Dun Walled Garden Footbridge East Of				56°43′49″N 2°32′38″W	Category C(S)	4666	Upload Photo
Dun Mill				56°43′27″N 2°32′42″W	Category C(S)	4671	Upload another image
Balwyllo, Farmhouse				56°43′20″N 2°33′51″W	Category B	4674	Upload Photo
Langley Park Lodge And Gates, S.W. Drive				56°43′41″N 2°31′16″W	Category B	4683	Upload Photo
Parish Church				56°43′50″N 2°32′59″W	Category B	4687	Upload Photo
Langley Park				56°44′04″N 2°31′12″W	Category B	4680	Upload another image
Dun Parish School				56°43′54″N 2°33′06″W	Category C(S)	4688	Upload Photo
Old Churchyard Of Dun				56°43′45″N 2°32′41″W	Category B	4689	Upload Photo
House of Dun (Hotel)				56°43′46″N 2°32′25″W	Category A	4691	Upload another image See more images
Bridge Of Dun				56°42′59″N 2°33′09″W	Category A	4677	Upload another image See more images
Broomley House				56°43′35″N 2°31′29″W	Category B	4678	Upload Photo
Langley Park Steading Now Called Langley Park Farm				56°44′00″N 2°31′27″W	Category B	4682	Upload Photo
Old Churchyard Of Dun Mausoleum				56°43′45″N 2°32′41″W	Category B	4690	Upload another image See more images
House Of Dun Court Of Offices				56°43′46″N 2°32′28″W	Category A	4692	Upload another image See more images
House Of Dun Sundial				56°43′44″N 2°32′25″W	Category B	4695	Upload another image
House Of Dun Walled Garden. Icehouse Near S.E. Corner				56°43′46″N 2°32′40″W	Category B	4665	Upload Photo
House Of Dun East Gates				56°43′32″N 2°32′13″W	Category B	4669	Upload another image
Bridge Over Railway E. Of Gilrivie				56°43′38″N 2°30′53″W	Category C(S)	4679	Upload Photo
Bridge Over Railway S. Of Wellhill				56°43′48″N 2°30′29″W	Category C(S)	4685	Upload Photo
Old Toll House (Burnside) Sleepyhillock				56°43′20″N 2°28′57″W	Category B	4686	Upload another image
House Of Dun Steps				56°43′45″N 2°32′25″W	Category C(S)	4694	Upload Photo
House Of Dun Icehouse (W. On Map Perhaps Wellhouse) S.S.W. Of House				56°43′39″N 2°32′29″W	Category B	4667	Upload Photo
Langley Park Mid Lodge, S.W. Drive				56°43′53″N 2°31′21″W	Category C(S)	4684	Upload Photo
House Of Dun West Gates				56°43′29″N 2°32′26″W	Category B	4668	Upload Photo
Balwyllo, Grieve's House (Former Farmhouse)				56°43′18″N 2°33′56″W	Category C(S)	4675	Upload Photo
Balwyllo, Range Of Cartsheds				56°43′19″N 2°33′57″W	Category B	4676	Upload another image
House Of Dun Walled Garden				56°43′48″N 2°32′42″W	Category B	4696	Upload Photo
House Of Dun East Gates Lodge				56°43′32″N 2°32′14″W	Category C(S)	4670	Upload Photo
Den Of Dun Bridge				56°43′32″N 2°32′29″W	Category C(S)	4672	Upload Photo
Icehouse In Den Wood N.W. Of Den Of Dun Bridge				56°43′46″N 2°32′39″W	Category B	4673	Upload Photo
House Of Dun Walled Garden And Terrace Gatepiers				56°43′48″N 2°32′42″W	Category B	4693	Upload Photo

== Key ==
The scheme for classifying buildings in Scotland is:

- Category A: "buildings of national or international importance, either architectural or historic; or fine, little-altered examples of some particular period, style or building type."
- Category B: "buildings of regional or more than local importance; or major examples of some particular period, style or building type, which may have been altered."
- Category C: "buildings of local importance; lesser examples of any period, style, or building type, as originally constructed or moderately altered; and simple traditional buildings which group well with other listed buildings."

In March 2016 there were 47,288 listed buildings in Scotland. Of these, 8% were Category A, and 50% were Category B, with the remaining 42% being Category C.

== See also ==
- List of listed buildings in Angus
