= List of listed buildings in Newtyle, Angus =

This is a list of listed buildings in the parish of Newtyle in Angus, Scotland.

== List ==
Name	Location	Date Listed	Grid Ref. (Note: Sometimes known as OSGB36, the grid reference (where provided) is based on the British national grid reference system used by the Ordnance Survey. • "Guide to National Grid". Ordnance Survey. • "Get-a-map". Ordnance Survey.)	Geo-coordinates	Notes	LB Number (Note: Historic Environment Scotland assign a unique alphanumeric identifier to each designated site in Scotland, for listed buildings this always begins with "LB", for example "LB12345".)	Image
Newtyle Parish Kirk				56°33′28″N 3°08′49″W	Category B	17996	Upload another image
Hatton Castle				56°33′23″N 3°08′15″W	Category B	17999	Upload Photo
35, 37, 39 Belmont Street Newtyle				56°33′31″N 3°08′33″W	Category C(S)	18002	Upload Photo
Parish Kirk Manse				56°33′24″N 3°08′44″W	Category C(S)	19848	Upload another image
33 Church Street Newtyle				56°33′31″N 3°08′40″W	Category C(S)	19849	Upload Photo
Old Observatory, Kinpurney Hill				56°33′46″N 3°06′14″W	Category B	18005	Upload Photo
Millhole, Road Bridge Over Former Dundee And Newtyle Railway				56°32′46″N 3°07′18″W	Category C(S)	49914	Upload Photo
Bannatyne House				56°33′20″N 3°09′02″W	Category B	17998	Upload Photo
A P Morris Church Street Newtyle				56°33′31″N 3°08′39″W	Category C(S)	18001	Upload Photo
Kinpurnie Castle				56°33′05″N 3°09′55″W	Category B	18006	Upload Photo
Davidston, Road Bridge Over Former Dundee And Newtyle Railway				56°32′35″N 3°06′59″W	Category C(S)	49913	Upload Photo
Kinpurnie Castle - Lodge Gates				56°33′09″N 3°09′53″W	Category B	18008	Upload Photo
44 Belmont Street Newtyle				56°33′30″N 3°08′38″W	Category C(S)	18003	Upload Photo
Kinpurnie Castle - Lodge				56°33′09″N 3°09′52″W	Category B	18007	Upload Photo
Former Railway Goods Station, Commercial Street Newtyle, Including Stepped Plinth Of Former Crane				56°33′32″N 3°08′28″W	Category B	18009	Upload another image
Newtyle Parish Kirkyard				56°33′27″N 3°08′49″W	Category B	17997	Upload Photo
1, 3 Castle Street Newtyle				56°33′30″N 3°08′36″W	Category C(S)	18000	Upload Photo
Nethermill				56°34′26″N 3°09′00″W	Category B	18004	Upload Photo
Near East Kinpurnie, Rail Bridge Over Former Dundee And Newtyle Railway				56°33′31″N 3°09′15″W	Category C(S)	49912	Upload Photo
East Kinpurnie, Rail Bridge Over Former Dundee And Newtyle Railway				56°33′24″N 3°09′33″W	Category C(S)	49892	Upload Photo

== Key ==
The scheme for classifying buildings in Scotland is:

- Category A: "buildings of national or international importance, either architectural or historic; or fine, little-altered examples of some particular period, style or building type."
- Category B: "buildings of regional or more than local importance; or major examples of some particular period, style or building type, which may have been altered."
- Category C: "buildings of local importance; lesser examples of any period, style, or building type, as originally constructed or moderately altered; and simple traditional buildings which group well with other listed buildings."

In March 2016 there were 47,288 listed buildings in Scotland. Of these, 8% were Category A, and 50% were Category B, with the remaining 42% being Category C.

== See also ==
- List of listed buildings in Angus
