= List of listed buildings in Logie Pert, Angus =

This is a list of listed buildings in the parish of Logie Pert in Angus, Scotland.

== List ==
| Name | Location | Date Listed | Grid Ref. (Note: Sometimes known as OSGB36, the grid reference (where provided) is based on the British national grid reference system used by the Ordnance Survey. • "Guide to National Grid". Ordnance Survey. • "Get-a-map". Ordnance Survey.) | Geo-coordinates | Notes | LB Number (Note: Historic Environment Scotland assign a unique alphanumeric identifier to each designated site in Scotland, for listed buildings this always begins with "LB", for example "LB12345".) | Image |
|---|---|---|---|---|---|---|---|
| Gallery | | | | 56°46′51″N 2°32′11″W | Category A | 11165 | Upload Photo |
| Pert Church, Churchyard | | | | 56°47′05″N 2°34′28″W | Category B | 11175 | Upload Photo |
| Craigo School | | | | 56°45′58″N 2°30′42″W | Category C(S) | 11180 | Upload Photo |
| Manse Lodge, Logie Pert | | | | 56°46′04″N 2°32′50″W | Category B | 11185 | Upload Photo |
| Dovecot, Mains Of Gallery | | | | 56°46′40″N 2°31′59″W | Category B | 11188 | Upload Photo |
| Church Of Logie | | | | 56°45′44″N 2°29′00″W | Category B | 13739 | Upload Photo |
| Marykirk Bridge | | | | 56°46′32″N 2°30′56″W | Category A | 11177 | Upload Photo |
| Marykirk Bridge, Tollhouse | | | | 56°46′31″N 2°30′58″W | Category A | 11178 | Upload Photo |
| Gallery Former Coach-House Etc | | | | 56°46′53″N 2°32′16″W | Category B | 11168 | Upload Photo |
| Craigo House, Gate Piers At East Lodge | | | | 56°45′26″N 2°30′05″W | Category C(S) | 11181 | Upload Photo |
| Gallery Walled Garden | | | | 56°46′53″N 2°32′13″W | Category B | 11166 | Upload Photo |
| Post Office, North Water Bridge | | | | 56°47′06″N 2°34′13″W | Category B | 11171 | Upload Photo |
| Pert Cottage, North Water Bridge | | | | 56°47′06″N 2°34′13″W | Category C(S) | 11172 | Upload Photo |
| Craigo House Coachhouses, Doocot Etc | | | | 56°45′15″N 2°30′39″W | Category C(S) | 11182 | Upload Photo |
| Smithy House, North Water Bridge | | | | 56°47′06″N 2°34′10″W | Category C(S) | 13738 | Upload Photo |
| Gallery Sundial | | | | 56°46′54″N 2°32′14″W | Category B | 11167 | Upload Photo |
| Smithy, North Water Bridge | | | | 56°47′06″N 2°34′10″W | Category C(S) | 11173 | Upload Photo |
| Pert Church (A Ruin) | | | | 56°47′05″N 2°34′29″W | Category B | 11174 | Upload Photo |
| Mill Of Pert, Farmhouse | | | | 56°47′13″N 2°35′23″W | Category B | 11176 | Upload Photo |
| Upper North Water Bridge | | | | 56°47′08″N 2°34′12″W | Category A | 11170 | Upload Photo |
| Church Of Logie, Churchyard | | | | 56°45′44″N 2°28′59″W | Category C(S) | 11179 | Upload Photo |
| Parish Church | | | | 56°46′09″N 2°32′54″W | Category B | 11184 | Upload another image |
| Gallery West Gates | | | | 56°46′49″N 2°32′30″W | Category C(S) | 11169 | Upload Photo |
| Logie Schoolhouse, Former U.F. Church | | | | 56°45′45″N 2°29′44″W | Category A | 50209 | Upload Photo |
| The Kirklands (Former Logie-Pert Manse) | | | | 56°46′05″N 2°32′46″W | Category C(S) | 13465 | Upload Photo |
| Craigo House, Walled Garden | | | | 56°45′20″N 2°30′33″W | Category C(S) | 11183 | Upload Photo |
| Dubton, Farmhouse | | | | 56°46′36″N 2°35′55″W | Category C(S) | 11187 | Upload Photo |

== Key ==
The scheme for classifying buildings in Scotland is:

- Category A: "buildings of national or international importance, either architectural or historic; or fine, little-altered examples of some particular period, style or building type."
- Category B: "buildings of regional or more than local importance; or major examples of some particular period, style or building type, which may have been altered."
- Category C: "buildings of local importance; lesser examples of any period, style, or building type, as originally constructed or moderately altered; and simple traditional buildings which group well with other listed buildings."

In March 2016 there were 47,288 listed buildings in Scotland. Of these, 8% were Category A, and 50% were Category B, with the remaining 42% being Category C.

== See also ==
- List of listed buildings in Angus
