= List of listed buildings in Fowlis Easter, Angus =

This is a list of listed buildings in the parish of Fowlis Easter in Angus, Scotland.

== List ==
Name	Location	Date Listed	Grid Ref. (Note: Sometimes known as OSGB36, the grid reference (where provided) is based on the British national grid reference system used by the Ordnance Survey. • "Guide to National Grid". Ordnance Survey. • "Get-a-map". Ordnance Survey.)	Geo-coordinates	Notes	LB Number (Note: Historic Environment Scotland assign a unique alphanumeric identifier to each designated site in Scotland, for listed buildings this always begins with "LB", for example "LB12345".)	Image
Fowlis Easter Parish Church Hearse House				56°29′19″N 3°06′11″W	Category B	13145	Upload another image
Former School House Including Boundary Walls				56°29′22″N 3°06′14″W	Category C(S)	12895	Upload Photo
Tayvallich Including Coach House/Stable And Boundary Walls				56°29′17″N 3°06′06″W	Category C(S)	13149	Upload Photo
Fowlis Castle				56°29′14″N 3°06′12″W	Category B	13619	Upload another image
Keithhall Farmhouse And Steading				56°30′14″N 3°06′14″W	Category C(S)	13148	Upload Photo
Fowlis Den Waulkmill Bridge				56°28′52″N 3°05′33″W	Category B	12898	Upload Photo
Berryhill Farmhouse Steading And Cottages				56°29′05″N 3°07′00″W	Category C(S)	12893	Upload Photo
Former Smithy Including Boundary Walls And Pigsty				56°29′16″N 3°06′16″W	Category C(S)	12896	Upload Photo
Fowlis Mill Including Outbuilding And Road Bridge Over Fowlis Burn With Sluice Walls				56°29′17″N 3°06′12″W	Category B	13146	Upload Photo
Fowlis Easter Parish Church Including Churchyard Cross And Graveslab And Boundary Wall				56°29′18″N 3°06′09″W	Category A	13144	Upload another image
Former School Including Playshed Wcs Boundary Wall And Railings				56°29′21″N 3°06′13″W	Category B	12894	Upload Photo

== Key ==
The scheme for classifying buildings in Scotland is:

- Category A: "buildings of national or international importance, either architectural or historic; or fine, little-altered examples of some particular period, style or building type."
- Category B: "buildings of regional or more than local importance; or major examples of some particular period, style or building type, which may have been altered."
- Category C: "buildings of local importance; lesser examples of any period, style, or building type, as originally constructed or moderately altered; and simple traditional buildings which group well with other listed buildings."

In March 2016 there were 47,288 listed buildings in Scotland. Of these, 8% were Category A, and 50% were Category B, with the remaining 42% being Category C.

== See also ==
- List of listed buildings in Angus
