= List of listed buildings in Lunan, Angus =

This is a list of listed buildings in the parish of Lunan in Angus, Scotland.

== List ==
Name	Location	Date Listed	Grid Ref. (Note: Sometimes known as OSGB36, the grid reference (where provided) is based on the British national grid reference system used by the Ordnance Survey. • "Guide to National Grid". Ordnance Survey. • "Get-a-map". Ordnance Survey.)	Geo-coordinates	Notes	LB Number (Note: Historic Environment Scotland assign a unique alphanumeric identifier to each designated site in Scotland, for listed buildings this always begins with "LB", for example "LB12345".)	Image
Lunan House, Icehouse				56°39′19″N 2°30′31″W	Category B	13819	Upload Photo
Nether Dysart Farmhouse				56°40′16″N 2°29′43″W	Category B	18243	Upload Photo
Lunan House				56°39′20″N 2°30′39″W	Category B	12442	Upload another image
Lunan House, Doocot				56°39′19″N 2°30′29″W	Category C(S)	12444	Upload Photo
Lunan Bridge Over Lunan Water				56°39′15″N 2°30′41″W	Category B	12440	Upload another image See more images
Former Parish Kirk Manse And Lunan Lodge				56°39′50″N 2°30′43″W	Category C(S)	12445	Upload Photo
Nether Dysart, Doocot				56°40′16″N 2°29′42″W	Category B	12446	Upload Photo
Lunan House, Steadings And "Aunt's Cottage"				56°39′18″N 2°30′35″W	Category B	12443	Upload Photo
Lunan Parish Kirk				56°39′17″N 2°30′43″W	Category B	12439	Upload another image See more images
Kirkton Of Lunan, Old Schoolhouse				56°39′22″N 2°30′46″W	Category C(S)	12441	Upload Photo
Lunan Lodge - Sundial				56°39′50″N 2°30′43″W	Category C(S)	18242	Upload Photo

== Key ==
The scheme for classifying buildings in Scotland is:

- Category A: "buildings of national or international importance, either architectural or historic; or fine, little-altered examples of some particular period, style or building type."
- Category B: "buildings of regional or more than local importance; or major examples of some particular period, style or building type, which may have been altered."
- Category C: "buildings of local importance; lesser examples of any period, style, or building type, as originally constructed or moderately altered; and simple traditional buildings which group well with other listed buildings."

In March 2016 there were 47,288 listed buildings in Scotland. Of these, 8% were Category A, and 50% were Category B, with the remaining 42% being Category C.

== See also ==
- List of listed buildings in Angus
