= List of listed buildings in Menmuir, Angus =

This is a list of listed buildings in the parish of Menmuir in Angus, Scotland.

== List ==
Name	Location	Date Listed	Grid Ref. (Note: Sometimes known as OSGB36, the grid reference (where provided) is based on the British national grid reference system used by the Ordnance Survey. • "Guide to National Grid". Ordnance Survey. • "Get-a-map". Ordnance Survey.)	Geo-coordinates	Notes	LB Number (Note: Historic Environment Scotland assign a unique alphanumeric identifier to each designated site in Scotland, for listed buildings this always begins with "LB", for example "LB12345".)	Image
Parish Church				56°46′07″N 2°45′50″W	Category B	19821	Upload another image See more images
Balnamoon House - Icehouse				56°45′48″N 2°44′12″W	Category B	17703	Upload Photo
The Old Inn Kirkton Of Menmuir				56°46′08″N 2°45′51″W	Category B	17732	Upload Photo
Tigerton, Fingerpost				56°46′09″N 2°45′25″W	Category C(S)	51610	Upload another image See more images
Milton Of Balhall Bridge Over Cruick Water				56°45′07″N 2°47′52″W	Category C(S)	17711	Upload Photo
Parish Churchyard				56°46′07″N 2°45′48″W	Category B	17729	Upload Photo
Balnamoon House - Lectern-Type Sundial E. Of House				56°45′45″N 2°44′07″W	Category A	17700	Upload Photo
Balnamoon House - Sundial Shaft By Stream E. Of House				56°45′43″N 2°44′10″W	Category B	17701	Upload Photo
Milton Of Balhall, Former Corn Mill				56°45′04″N 2°47′56″W	Category B	17710	Upload Photo
Balnamoon House - Sundial In Front Of Porch				56°45′45″N 2°44′10″W	Category B	17737	Upload Photo
Balrownie - Farmhouse				56°46′06″N 2°42′18″W	Category C(S)	17708	Upload Photo
Former Lochty Free Church, Now Outbuilding Of Lochty Farm				56°45′02″N 2°45′26″W	Category C(S)	17734	Upload Photo
Balnamoon House - Garden				56°45′45″N 2°44′03″W	Category B	17702	Upload Photo
Mill Of Cruick, Former Corn Mill				56°45′16″N 2°42′48″W	Category B	17706	Upload Photo
Mill Of Balrownie Bridge Over Cruick Water				56°45′45″N 2°41′59″W	Category C(S)	17707	Upload Photo
Balconnel-Farmhouse				56°45′53″N 2°47′07″W	Category C(S)	17709	Upload Photo
Balnamoon House				56°45′46″N 2°44′10″W	Category B	17736	Upload Photo
Balnamoon House - House (Mrs. Laing Tenant)				56°45′46″N 2°44′10″W	Category B	17705	Upload Photo
Blackhall, Former Corn Mill				56°45′17″N 2°44′15″W	Category B	17735	Upload Photo
Balnamoon House - Doocot				56°45′49″N 2°44′30″W	Category B	17704	Upload another image
Parish Manse				56°46′05″N 2°45′49″W	Category B	17730	Upload Photo
Parish Manse Offices				56°46′06″N 2°45′51″W	Category C(S)	17731	Upload Photo
Bridge Over Blackhall Mill Lade N. Of Lochty Farm				56°45′17″N 2°45′34″W	Category C(S)	17733	Upload Photo

== Key ==
The scheme for classifying buildings in Scotland is:

- Category A: "buildings of national or international importance, either architectural or historic; or fine, little-altered examples of some particular period, style or building type."
- Category B: "buildings of regional or more than local importance; or major examples of some particular period, style or building type, which may have been altered."
- Category C: "buildings of local importance; lesser examples of any period, style, or building type, as originally constructed or moderately altered; and simple traditional buildings which group well with other listed buildings."

In March 2016 there were 47,288 listed buildings in Scotland. Of these, 8% were Category A, and 50% were Category B, with the remaining 42% being Category C.

== See also ==
- List of listed buildings in Angus
