= List of listed buildings in Inverkeilor, Angus =

This is a list of listed buildings in the parish of Inverkeilor in Angus, Scotland.

== List ==
Name	Location	Date Listed	Grid Ref. (Note: Sometimes known as OSGB36, the grid reference (where provided) is based on the British national grid reference system used by the Ordnance Survey. • "Guide to National Grid". Ordnance Survey. • "Get-a-map". Ordnance Survey.)	Geo-coordinates	Notes	LB Number (Note: Historic Environment Scotland assign a unique alphanumeric identifier to each designated site in Scotland, for listed buildings this always begins with "LB", for example "LB12345".)	Image
Ethie Castle				56°36′45″N 2°30′39″W	Category A	11278	Upload Photo
Lunan Bank House				56°37′29″N 2°34′46″W	Category B	11286	Upload Photo
Lawton House Including Hencote And Steading				56°37′38″N 2°35′34″W	Category B	11287	Upload Photo
Leysmill, Main Street Cottages				56°37′08″N 2°38′46″W	Category C(S)	11293	Upload Photo
St. Murdoch's Chapel				56°37′21″N 2°29′07″W	Category B	11283	Upload another image
Boysack Mill Bridge Over Lunan Water				56°37′57″N 2°36′50″W	Category B	11292	Upload another image
Leysmill Farmhouse				56°37′14″N 2°38′49″W	Category C(S)	11294	Upload Photo
"Rowan Cottage", Inverkeilor				56°38′03″N 2°32′48″W	Category C(S)	11301	Upload Photo
Hilton Farmhouse				56°38′43″N 2°33′23″W	Category B	11272	Upload Photo
Ethie - Walled Garden				56°36′46″N 2°30′36″W	Category B	11279	Upload Photo
Abbeythune House - North Lodge				56°37′40″N 2°33′02″W	Category C(S)	11284	Upload Photo
Old Kinblethmont				56°36′48″N 2°35′31″W	Category B	11288	Upload Photo
Boysack Mill				56°37′57″N 2°36′49″W	Category B	11290	Upload Photo
Leysmill, K6 Telephone Kiosk				56°37′09″N 2°38′43″W	Category B	13078	Upload Photo
Marywell Bridge Over Lunan Water				56°37′57″N 2°33′10″W	Category B	11302	Upload Photo
Anniston Mill				56°37′37″N 2°31′25″W	Category C(S)	11276	Upload Photo
Raesmill Farmhouse				56°37′17″N 2°31′16″W	Category C(S)	11277	Upload Photo
Inverkeilor Parish Kirk				56°38′13″N 2°32′54″W	Category C(S)	11295	Upload another image
Kirkton Mill Bridge Over Lunan Water				56°38′09″N 2°33′53″W	Category B	11270	Upload another image
Cotton Of Inchock - Farm Cottage				56°37′30″N 2°31′42″W	Category C(S)	11275	Upload Photo
Ethie - Barns				56°36′49″N 2°30′20″W	Category C(S)	11282	Upload Photo
Boysack Miller's House				56°37′56″N 2°36′36″W	Category B	11291	Upload Photo
Northesk Burial Aisle				56°38′13″N 2°32′54″W	Category B	11296	Upload Photo
Old Kirkton Mill				56°38′04″N 2°33′42″W	Category C(S)	11269	Upload Photo
Red Castle - Keep				56°39′02″N 2°30′39″W	Category A	11274	Upload another image
Chapelton Burial Place				56°37′14″N 2°36′47″W	Category C(S)	11289	Upload Photo
Rait Mural Monument, Parish Kirkyard				56°38′14″N 2°32′55″W	Category B	11297	Upload Photo
Parish Kirk Manse				56°38′11″N 2°32′53″W	Category C(S)	11299	Upload Photo
Red Castle - Enceinte				56°39′02″N 2°30′39″W	Category A	11273	Upload another image
Balmullie Mill - Bridge Over Lunan Water				56°37′43″N 2°34′35″W	Category C(S)	11285	Upload another image
Balmullie Mill				56°37′43″N 2°34′33″W	Category C(S)	13746	Upload another image See more images
Carnegie Mural Monument, Parish Kirkyard				56°38′14″N 2°32′55″W	Category C(S)	11298	Upload Photo
Kirkton Farm Building				56°38′10″N 2°32′48″W	Category C(S)	11300	Upload Photo
Grange House				56°38′13″N 2°33′42″W	Category C(S)	11271	Upload Photo
Ethie - Garden Storehouse				56°36′43″N 2°30′30″W	Category B	11280	Upload Photo
Ethie - Garden - House				56°36′43″N 2°30′35″W	Category C(S)	11281	Upload Photo

== Key ==
The scheme for classifying buildings in Scotland is:

- Category A: "buildings of national or international importance, either architectural or historic; or fine, little-altered examples of some particular period, style or building type."
- Category B: "buildings of regional or more than local importance; or major examples of some particular period, style or building type, which may have been altered."
- Category C: "buildings of local importance; lesser examples of any period, style, or building type, as originally constructed or moderately altered; and simple traditional buildings which group well with other listed buildings."

In March 2016 there were 47,288 listed buildings in Scotland. Of these, 8% were Category A, and 50% were Category B, with the remaining 42% being Category C.

== See also ==
- List of listed buildings in Angus
