= List of listed buildings in Auchterhouse, Angus =

This is a list of listed buildings in the parish of Auchterhouse in Angus, Scotland.

== List ==
Name	Location	Date Listed	Grid Ref. (Note: Sometimes known as OSGB36, the grid reference (where provided) is based on the British national grid reference system used by the Ordnance Survey. • "Guide to National Grid". Ordnance Survey. • "Get-a-map". Ordnance Survey.)	Geo-coordinates	Notes	LB Number (Note: Historic Environment Scotland assign a unique alphanumeric identifier to each designated site in Scotland, for listed buildings this always begins with "LB", for example "LB12345".)	Image
Kirkton Of Auchterhouse, War Memorial				56°31′55″N 3°04′07″W	Category C(S)	6496	Upload another image
Eastfield, Road Bridge Over Former Newtyle Railway				56°31′30″N 3°04′27″W	Category B	6492	Upload Photo
Kirkton Of Auchterhouse, Kirkton Farmhouse Including Coach House And Stable And Boundary Walls And Gateposts				56°31′35″N 3°03′59″W	Category C(S)	6495	Upload Photo
Pitpointie, Pitpointie Farmhouse Including Thatched Game Store, Enclosing Wall And Gatepiers, Walled Garden And Coach House, Gatepiers And Adjoining Walls At S, And Timber Piers At W				56°31′29″N 3°03′15″W	Category B	6497	Upload Photo
Auchterhouse Old Mansion House Hotel Laundry				56°31′23″N 3°05′16″W	Category B	6474	Upload Photo
Auchterhouse Bridge Cottage Weir Adjacent To Road Bridge Over Auchterhouse Burn				56°31′26″N 3°05′17″W	Category B	5688	Upload Photo
Kirkton Of Auchterhouse, Former Manse Including Buildings Identified As Old Manse And Steading And Boundary Walls				56°31′50″N 3°04′13″W	Category B	6494	Upload Photo
Templeton, Road Bridge Over Dichty Water				56°30′26″N 3°02′55″W	Category B	6499	Upload Photo
Auchterhouse Old Mansion House Hotel Stable/Coach House/Squash Court				56°31′23″N 3°05′18″W	Category C(S)	6476	Upload Photo
Balbeuchley, Balbeuchley Steading				56°31′42″N 3°02′29″W	Category B	6481	Upload Photo
Dronley Road, Bridge Over Dronley Burn				56°30′30″N 3°04′03″W	Category B	6485	Upload another image
Eastfield, Eastfield Steading				56°31′20″N 3°04′27″W	Category B	6491	Upload Photo
Auchterhouse Old Mansion House Hotel Including Game Store Garden And Enclosing Walls				56°31′22″N 3°05′20″W	Category A	5689	Upload another image
South Fallows, Road Bridge Over Fallows Burn				56°30′53″N 3°02′01″W	Category C(S)	6498	Upload Photo
Auchterhouse Old Mansion House Hotel Sundial				56°31′22″N 3°05′21″W	Category B	6477	Upload Photo
Auchterhouse Old Mansion House Hotel, Wallace Tower				56°31′22″N 3°05′17″W	Category B	6479	Upload Photo
Balbeuchley, Balbeuchley House, Including Walled Garden, Boundary Wall And Gateposts				56°31′45″N 3°02′37″W	Category B	6480	Upload Photo
Bonnyton, Bonnyton Bridge Road Bridge Over Den Burn				56°32′17″N 3°05′49″W	Category C(S)	6482	Upload Photo
East Adamston, Farmhouse Including Boundary Wall				56°30′24″N 3°05′28″W	Category B	6487	Upload Photo
East Adamston, Road Bridge Over Dichty Water				56°30′16″N 3°04′56″W	Category B	6489	Upload another image
Eastfield, Eastfield Farmhouse Including Boundary Walls				56°31′18″N 3°04′23″W	Category C(S)	6490	Upload Photo
Kirkton Of Auchterhouse, Auchterhouse Parish Church Including Churchyard				56°31′50″N 3°04′16″W	Category B	6493	Upload Photo
Auchterhouse, Auchterhouse Park, (Formerly Sidlaw Hospital), Including Gatepiers				56°32′29″N 3°03′47″W	Category B	5685	Upload Photo
Auchterhouse Old Mansion House Hotel Lodge				56°31′24″N 3°05′17″W	Category B	6475	Upload Photo
Auchterhouse Old Mansion House Hotel Turbine House Including Machinery And Water Supply Pipe From Weir				56°31′14″N 3°05′19″W	Category B	6478	Upload Photo
Dronley, Dronley Mill				56°30′36″N 3°04′12″W	Category C(S)	6484	Upload Photo
Auchterhouse Old Mansion House Hotel Dovecot				56°31′24″N 3°05′14″W	Category A	5690	Upload Photo
Auchterhouse Road Bridge Over Auchterhouse Burn				56°31′26″N 3°05′17″W	Category B	5687	Upload Photo
Auchterhouse Old Mansion House Hotel Gatepiers And Adjoining Boundary Walls				56°31′25″N 3°05′18″W	Category B	5691	Upload Photo
Denhead, Former Road Bridge Over Dronley Burn				56°30′53″N 3°04′50″W	Category B	6483	Upload Photo
Dronley, Dronley House Including Gatepiers And Quadrants				56°30′58″N 3°04′19″W	Category B	6486	Upload Photo
East Adamston Mill, Road Bridge Over Dichty Water				56°30′19″N 3°05′13″W	Category C(S)	6488	Upload Photo
Auchterhouse Auchterhouse Park Formerly Sidlaw Hospital South Lodge				56°32′26″N 3°03′45″W	Category C(S)	5686	Upload Photo

== Key ==
The scheme for classifying buildings in Scotland is:

- Category A: "buildings of national or international importance, either architectural or historic; or fine, little-altered examples of some particular period, style or building type."
- Category B: "buildings of regional or more than local importance; or major examples of some particular period, style or building type, which may have been altered."
- Category C: "buildings of local importance; lesser examples of any period, style, or building type, as originally constructed or moderately altered; and simple traditional buildings which group well with other listed buildings."

In March 2016 there were 47,288 listed buildings in Scotland. Of these, 8% were Category A, and 50% were Category B, with the remaining 42% being Category C.

== See also ==
- List of listed buildings in Angus
