= List of listed buildings in Lintrathen, Angus =

This is a list of listed buildings in the parish of Lintrathen in Angus, Scotland.

== List ==
| Name | Location | Date Listed | Grid Ref. (Note: Sometimes known as OSGB36, the grid reference (where provided) is based on the British national grid reference system used by the Ordnance Survey. • "Guide to National Grid". Ordnance Survey. • "Get-a-map". Ordnance Survey.) | Geo-coordinates | Notes | LB Number (Note: Historic Environment Scotland assign a unique alphanumeric identifier to each designated site in Scotland, for listed buildings this always begins with "LB", for example "LB12345".) | Image |
|---|---|---|---|---|---|---|---|
| West Lodge - Gates | | | | 56°40′21″N 3°11′47″W | Category C(S) | 11438 | Upload another image See more images |
| Fornethy Residential School | | | | 56°41′11″N 3°13′54″W | Category C(S) | 11439 | Upload Photo |
| Dykend Bridge Over Back Water | | | | 56°42′15″N 3°13′29″W | Category B | 11441 | Upload Photo |
| Lintrathen Parish Kirk | | | | 56°40′39″N 3°10′04″W | Category C(S) | 11431 | Upload Photo |
| Parish Kirk Manse Now Melgam House | | | | 56°40′39″N 3°10′09″W | Category C(S) | 11434 | Upload Photo |
| Lintrathen Bridge Over Melgam Water | | | | 56°40′39″N 3°10′17″W | Category C(S) | 11435 | Upload another image See more images |
| Balintore - Burnside Lodge | | | | 56°42′50″N 3°09′06″W | Category C(S) | 11442 | Upload Photo |
| Bridge Of Lintrathen, Fingerpost | | | | 56°40′38″N 3°10′18″W | Category C(S) | 51611 | Upload another image See more images |
| Balintore Castle | | | | 56°43′03″N 3°09′40″W | Category A | 13757 | Upload another image |
| Kirkton Of Lintrathen - Old Cornmill | | | | 56°40′38″N 3°10′16″W | Category C(S) | 11437 | Upload Photo |
| Lintrathen Reservoir, Main Lodge Including Stable Courtyard And Archway, Entrance Gatepiers And Gates | | | | 56°40′22″N 3°11′16″W | Category B | 48618 | Upload Photo |
| Parish Kirkyard Walls And Tombstones | | | | 56°40′39″N 3°10′03″W | Category C(S) | 11432 | Upload Photo |
| Foldend Forester's House | | | | 56°41′15″N 3°09′48″W | Category C(S) | 11440 | Upload Photo |
| Parish Kirkyard - Hearse House | | | | 56°40′39″N 3°10′05″W | Category C(S) | 11433 | Upload Photo |
| Kirkton Of Lintrathen - "Craigie Linn Cottage" | | | | 56°40′39″N 3°10′15″W | Category C(S) | 11436 | Upload Photo |
| Lintrathen Water Board - West Lodge | | | | 56°40′22″N 3°11′48″W | Category C(S) | 13756 | Upload Photo |
| Balintore Castle, Kennels | | | | 56°43′05″N 3°09′44″W | Category C(S) | 12969 | Upload Photo |

== Key ==
The scheme for classifying buildings in Scotland is:

- Category A: "buildings of national or international importance, either architectural or historic; or fine, little-altered examples of some particular period, style or building type."
- Category B: "buildings of regional or more than local importance; or major examples of some particular period, style or building type, which may have been altered."
- Category C: "buildings of local importance; lesser examples of any period, style, or building type, as originally constructed or moderately altered; and simple traditional buildings which group well with other listed buildings."

In March 2016 there were 47,288 listed buildings in Scotland. Of these, 8% were Category A, and 50% were Category B, with the remaining 42% being Category C.

== See also ==
- List of listed buildings in Angus
