= List of listed buildings in Liff And Benvie, Angus =

This is a list of listed buildings in the parish of Liff And Benvie in Angus, Scotland.

== List ==
Name	Location	Date Listed	Grid Ref. (Note: Sometimes known as OSGB36, the grid reference (where provided) is based on the British national grid reference system used by the Ordnance Survey. • "Guide to National Grid". Ordnance Survey. • "Get-a-map". Ordnance Survey.)	Geo-coordinates	Notes	LB Number (Note: Historic Environment Scotland assign a unique alphanumeric identifier to each designated site in Scotland, for listed buildings this always begins with "LB", for example "LB12345".)	Image
Liff, Liff Primary School (Later Building), Including Boundary Walls				56°29′06″N 3°04′28″W	Category C(S)	13212	Upload Photo
Liff, Parish Church, Hearse House				56°29′00″N 3°05′04″W	Category B	13215	Upload another image
Muirhead Of Liff, Coupar Angus Road, Lundie And Muirhead Church, Lundie And Muirhead War Memorial				56°29′51″N 3°04′15″W	Category C(S)	13221	Upload Photo
Balruddery, West Coach House/Steading				56°28′39″N 3°06′52″W	Category C(S)	10857	Upload Photo
Birkhill, Coupar Angus Road, Browhead Cottage				56°29′32″N 3°02′55″W	Category C(S)	50077	Upload Photo
Liff, Lossie Hall, Including Boundary Walls				56°29′09″N 3°04′32″W	Category C(S)	13213	Upload Photo
Liff, Parish Church Including Churchyard, Boundary Walls And Gatepiers, And Old Font				56°28′58″N 3°05′04″W	Category B	13214	Upload another image See more images
Muirhead Of Liff, Coupar Angus Road, Muirhead School (Later Building), Including Playsheds, Boundary Wall And Gatepiers				56°29′51″N 3°04′19″W	Category B	13223	Upload Photo
Balruddery, East Lodge				56°28′25″N 3°06′26″W	Category C(S)	10855	Upload Photo
Benvie, Benvie Farmhouse, Including Outbuildings And Boundary Walls				56°28′14″N 3°05′39″W	Category B	10863	Upload Photo
Liff, 8 Church Road, Former Manse, Including Coach House/Stable/Steading, And Boundary Walls				56°29′03″N 3°04′58″W	Category B	13209	Upload Photo
Liff 9 Fowlis Road, The Cottage, Including Boundary Walls				56°29′09″N 3°05′12″W	Category C(S)	13210	Upload Photo
Liff, Parish Church, Watt/Webster Memorial				56°28′59″N 3°05′05″W	Category B	13217	Upload Photo
Muirhead Of Liff, Coupar Angus Road, Lundie And Muirhead Church, Including Gatepier And Boundary Walls				56°29′51″N 3°04′16″W	Category C(S)	13220	Upload Photo
Balruddery, East Gates, Including Gatepiers, Quadrants And Adjoining Walls				56°28′25″N 3°06′25″W	Category A	10854	Upload Photo
Liff, Parish Church, War Memorial				56°28′59″N 3°05′04″W	Category B	13216	Upload Photo
Muirhead Of Liff, 147 Coupar Angus Road, The Old Schoolhouse				56°29′51″N 3°04′14″W	Category C(S)	13224	Upload Photo
Balruddery, Wester Balruddery				56°28′38″N 3°07′09″W	Category B	10860	Upload Photo
Balruddery, Balruddery Farm, Road Bridge Over Blacklaw Burn, North Of Balruddery Farm				56°29′10″N 3°07′45″W	Category C(S)	10859	Upload Photo
Liff, Gray Cottage				56°28′56″N 3°05′01″W	Category C(S)	12860	Upload Photo
Balruddery, Balruddery Farm, Farmhouse, Including Boundary Walls				56°28′59″N 3°07′57″W	Category B	10858	Upload Photo
Little Dronley, Road Bridge Over Dichty Water				56°30′16″N 3°04′00″W	Category C(S)	13219	Upload Photo
Birkhill 170 Coupar Angus Road Rose Cottage Including Boundary Walls				56°29′39″N 3°03′26″W	Category C(S)	12857	Upload Photo
Balruddery, East Stable Court/Steading				56°28′40″N 3°06′50″W	Category C(S)	10856	Upload Photo
Liff, Corner Of Church And Woodside Road, The Neuk, (Formerly Liff Inn)				56°29′08″N 3°05′06″W	Category B	13208	Upload Photo
Liff, Liff Primary School And School House (Original Building), Including Boundary Walls				56°29′04″N 3°04′28″W	Category C(S)	13211	Upload Photo
Liff, Wild Acres, Old Manse				56°28′56″N 3°05′03″W	Category B	13218	Upload Photo
Muirhead Of Liff, Muirhead School (Original Building), Including Boundary Walls				56°29′53″N 3°04′16″W	Category C(S)	13222	Upload Photo
Balruddery, Wester Balruddery, Ice House				56°28′36″N 3°07′05″W	Category C(S)	10861	Upload Photo

== Key ==
The scheme for classifying buildings in Scotland is:

- Category A: "buildings of national or international importance, either architectural or historic; or fine, little-altered examples of some particular period, style or building type."
- Category B: "buildings of regional or more than local importance; or major examples of some particular period, style or building type, which may have been altered."
- Category C: "buildings of local importance; lesser examples of any period, style, or building type, as originally constructed or moderately altered; and simple traditional buildings which group well with other listed buildings."

In March 2016 there were 47,288 listed buildings in Scotland. Of these, 8% were Category A, and 50% were Category B, with the remaining 42% being Category C.

== See also ==
- List of listed buildings in Angus
