= List of listed buildings in Rescobie, Angus =

This is a list of listed buildings in the parish of Rescobie in Angus, Scotland.

== List ==
Name	Location	Date Listed	Grid Ref. (Note: Sometimes known as OSGB36, the grid reference (where provided) is based on the British national grid reference system used by the Ordnance Survey. • "Guide to National Grid". Ordnance Survey. • "Get-a-map". Ordnance Survey.)	Geo-coordinates	Notes	LB Number (Note: Historic Environment Scotland assign a unique alphanumeric identifier to each designated site in Scotland, for listed buildings this always begins with "LB", for example "LB12345".)	Image
Balmadies - North Lodge Gates				56°38′35″N 2°44′02″W	Category B	17667	Upload Photo
Chapelton - Burial Ground				56°38′45″N 2°45′03″W	Category B	17671	Upload Photo
Guthrie Castle - West Lodge				56°38′29″N 2°43′12″W	Category B	17673	Upload Photo
Carse Gray House				56°40′22″N 2°52′32″W	Category B	17676	Upload another image
Guthrie Castle - Icehouse				56°38′35″N 2°43′15″W	Category B	17675	Upload Photo
North Mains Of Turin - Doocot				56°40′02″N 2°46′10″W	Category B	17677	Upload Photo
Kirkyard Walls				56°39′27″N 2°48′07″W	Category B	17679	Upload Photo
Manse - Gatepiers				56°39′29″N 2°48′10″W	Category C(S)	17681	Upload Photo
Burnside House				56°38′23″N 2°48′53″W	Category C(S)	17686	Upload Photo
Burnside - Doocot				56°38′21″N 2°48′55″W	Category B	17687	Upload Photo
Burnside Bridge Over Burnside Burn				56°38′21″N 2°49′37″W	Category C(S)	19816	Upload Photo
Balmadies - Bridge Over The Holms				56°38′26″N 2°43′59″W	Category B	17665	Upload Photo
Milldens Of Balmadies Farmhouse				56°38′38″N 2°44′19″W	Category B	17672	Upload Photo
Rescobie Parish Kirk				56°39′27″N 2°48′07″W	Category B	17678	Upload another image
Manse - Offices				56°39′28″N 2°48′08″W	Category C(S)	17682	Upload Photo
Reswallie House				56°39′10″N 2°48′39″W	Category B	19815	Upload Photo
Pitscandly House				56°39′42″N 2°50′35″W	Category A	17657	Upload Photo
Pitscandly - Sundial (1)				56°39′41″N 2°50′36″W	Category C(S)	17658	Upload Photo
Pitscandly - Sundial (2)				56°39′42″N 2°50′36″W	Category C(S)	17660	Upload Photo
Balmadies - Stable Gatepiers				56°38′15″N 2°43′59″W	Category B	17664	Upload Photo
Balmadies - Birkward Croft				56°38′07″N 2°45′02″W	Category C(S)	17669	Upload Photo
"The Old Toll House" Clocksbriggs				56°39′23″N 2°48′42″W	Category C(S)	17683	Upload Photo
Reswallie - West Lodge Gates				56°39′08″N 2°48′47″W	Category B	17685	Upload Photo
Pitscandly - Walled Garden				56°39′42″N 2°50′31″W	Category C(S)	17659	Upload Photo
Balmadies House				56°38′13″N 2°43′51″W	Category B	17662	Upload Photo
Balmadies - Red Lodge				56°38′08″N 2°45′02″W	Category B	17668	Upload Photo
Guthrie Castle - West Gate				56°38′29″N 2°43′13″W	Category B	17674	Upload another image
Reswallie - West Lodge				56°39′09″N 2°48′47″W	Category B	17684	Upload Photo
Balmadies - Mains Farmhouse				56°38′13″N 2°44′09″W	Category C(S)	19813	Upload Photo
Balmadies - Stables				56°38′15″N 2°43′59″W	Category B	17663	Upload Photo
Chapelton Farmhouse				56°38′26″N 2°45′14″W	Category B	17670	Upload Photo
Carse Gray - Sundial				56°40′20″N 2°52′31″W	Category B	19814	Upload Photo
Pitscandly - Doocot				56°39′41″N 2°50′32″W	Category B	17661	Upload Photo
Balmadies - North Lodge				56°38′34″N 2°44′02″W	Category B	17666	Upload Photo
Former Parish Kirk Manse				56°39′29″N 2°48′10″W	Category C(S)	17680	Upload Photo

== Key ==
The scheme for classifying buildings in Scotland is:

- Category A: "buildings of national or international importance, either architectural or historic; or fine, little-altered examples of some particular period, style or building type."
- Category B: "buildings of regional or more than local importance; or major examples of some particular period, style or building type, which may have been altered."
- Category C: "buildings of local importance; lesser examples of any period, style, or building type, as originally constructed or moderately altered; and simple traditional buildings which group well with other listed buildings."

In March 2016 there were 47,288 listed buildings in Scotland. Of these, 8% were Category A, and 50% were Category B, with the remaining 42% being Category C.

== See also ==
- List of listed buildings in Angus
