= List of listed buildings in Angus =

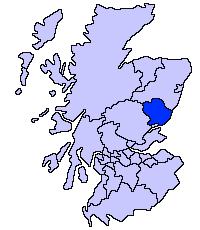
Angus shown within Scotland

This is a list of listed buildings in Angus, Scotland. The list is split out by parish.

- List of listed buildings in Aberlemno, Angus
- List of listed buildings in Airlie, Angus
- List of listed buildings in Arbirlot, Angus
- List of listed buildings in Arbroath and St Vigeans, Angus
- List of listed buildings in Arbroath, Angus
- List of listed buildings in Auchterhouse, Angus
- List of listed buildings in Barry, Angus
- List of listed buildings in Brechin, Angus
- List of listed buildings in Careston, Angus
- List of listed buildings in Carmyllie, Angus
- List of listed buildings in Carnoustie, Angus
- List of listed buildings in Cortachy And Clova, Angus
- List of listed buildings in Craig, Angus
- List of listed buildings in Dun, Angus
- List of listed buildings in Dunnichen, Angus
- List of listed buildings in Eassie And Nevay, Angus
- List of listed buildings in Edzell, Angus
- List of listed buildings in Farnell, Angus
- List of listed buildings in Fern, Angus
- List of listed buildings in Forfar, Angus
- List of listed buildings in Fowlis Easter, Angus
- List of listed buildings in Glamis, Angus
- List of listed buildings in Glenisla, Angus
- List of listed buildings in Guthrie, Angus
- List of listed buildings in Inverarity, Angus
- List of listed buildings in Inverkeilor, Angus
- List of listed buildings in Kingoldrum, Angus
- List of listed buildings in Kinnell, Angus
- List of listed buildings in Kinnettles, Angus
- List of listed buildings in Kirkden, Angus
- List of listed buildings in Kirriemuir, Angus
- List of listed buildings in Lethnot And Navar, Angus
- List of listed buildings in Liff And Benvie, Angus
- List of listed buildings in Lintrathen, Angus
- List of listed buildings in Lochlee, Angus
- List of listed buildings in Logie Pert, Angus
- List of listed buildings in Lunan, Angus
- List of listed buildings in Lundie, Angus
- List of listed buildings in Mains And Strathmartine, Angus
- List of listed buildings in Maryton, Angus
- List of listed buildings in Menmuir, Angus
- List of listed buildings in Monifieth, Angus
- List of listed buildings in Monikie, Angus
- List of listed buildings in Montrose, Angus
- List of listed buildings in Murroes, Angus
- List of listed buildings in Newtyle, Angus
- List of listed buildings in Oathlaw, Angus
- List of listed buildings in Panbride, Angus
- List of listed buildings in Rescobie, Angus
- List of listed buildings in Ruthven, Angus
- List of listed buildings in Stracathro, Angus
- List of listed buildings in Tannadice, Angus
- List of listed buildings in Tealing, Angus

== See also ==
- Scheduled monuments in Angus
