= List of listed buildings in Lundie, Angus =

This is a list of listed buildings in the parish of Lundie in Angus, Scotland.

== List ==
Name	Location	Date listed	Geo-coordinates	Notes	Category	LB number	Image
Lundie Castle Including Enclosing Walls And Gatepiers And Garden House			56°30′42″N 3°07′26″W		C(S)	13082	Upload Photo
Lundie Mill House/Kirklands			56°30′58″N 3°09′14″W		B	13084	Upload Photo
Lundie Mill And Steading			56°30′55″N 3°09′03″W		B	13636	Upload Photo
Neuk Farmhouse			56°31′58″N 3°07′42″W		C(S)	13088	Upload Photo
Parish Church, Including Duncan Burial Enclosure, Churchyard Wall And Gatepiers			56°30′58″N 3°09′16″W		A	13090	Upload another image
Clushmill Mill House, Including Stables			56°31′17″N 3°08′15″W		C(S)	13080	Upload Photo
The Roundie, Village Pump			56°30′58″N 3°09′13″W		B	13087	Upload Photo
Wester Keith, Cartshed And Granary			56°31′43″N 3°09′31″W		B	13091	Upload Photo
Lundie Village, K6 Telephone Kiosk Close To The Church			56°30′57″N 3°09′13″W		B	13085	Upload Photo
Ardgarth Cottage			56°31′15″N 3°09′48″W		C(S)	13079	Upload Photo
Former School Including Boundary Wall			56°30′57″N 3°09′07″W		B	13081	Upload Photo
Lundie Castle Farm, Farmhouse			56°30′29″N 3°07′20″W		C(S)	13083	Upload Photo
Lundie Village, Pump Near Village Hall			56°31′00″N 3°09′21″W		B	13086	Upload Photo
Old Manse, Garden Wall And Pump, Coach House/Stable			56°30′53″N 3°09′17″W		C(S)	13089	Upload Photo

== Key ==
The scheme for classifying buildings in Scotland is:

- Category A: "buildings of national or international importance, either architectural or historic; or fine, little-altered examples of some particular period, style or building type."
- Category B: "buildings of regional or more than local importance; or major examples of some particular period, style or building type, which may have been altered."
- Category C: "buildings of local importance; lesser examples of any period, style, or building type, as originally constructed or moderately altered; and simple traditional buildings which group well with other listed buildings."

In March 2016 there were 47,288 listed buildings in Scotland. Of these, 8% were Category A, and 50% were Category B, with the remaining 42% being Category C.

== See also ==
- List of listed buildings in Angus
