= List of listed buildings in Tealing, Angus =

This is a list of listed buildings in the parish of Tealing in Angus, Scotland.

== List ==
Name	Location	Date Listed	Grid Ref. (Note: Sometimes known as OSGB36, the grid reference (where provided) is based on the British national grid reference system used by the Ordnance Survey. • "Guide to National Grid". Ordnance Survey. • "Get-a-map". Ordnance Survey.)	Geo-coordinates	Notes	LB Number (Note: Historic Environment Scotland assign a unique alphanumeric identifier to each designated site in Scotland, for listed buildings this always begins with "LB", for example "LB12345".)	Image
Tealing House, Tealing Home Farm, Steading, Including Implement Shed, Gatepiers And Boundary Wall				56°31′54″N 2°57′20″W	Category B	18992	Upload Photo
Balgray, Mansefield (Former Free Church Manse), Including Former Free Church, Gig House And Stable, Ha-Ha, Gatepiers And Boundary Walls And Horse Shelter				56°32′24″N 2°57′51″W	Category B	17445	Upload Photo
Kirkton Of Tealing, Old Manse, Cottage And Steading				56°31′48″N 2°58′14″W	Category C(S)	17453	Upload Photo
Over Finlarg, Farmhouse, Including Boundary Walls, Gatepiers, Gateposts, Terrace Wall And Steps				56°33′39″N 2°57′10″W	Category C(S)	17455	Upload Photo
South Balluderon Farm, Farmhouse, Including Walled Garden, Retaining Walls And Gatepiers				56°31′49″N 3°00′58″W	Category C(S)	17457	Upload Photo
Tealing House, Walled Garden				56°31′50″N 2°57′16″W	Category C(S)	18993	Upload Photo
Tealing House, Tealing Home Farm, Dovecot				56°31′54″N 2°57′22″W	Category A	18988	Upload Photo
Balgray, Road Bridge Over Tealing Burn				56°32′08″N 2°57′46″W	Category C(S)	17446	Upload Photo
Tealing House				56°31′49″N 2°57′21″W	Category B	17459	Upload Photo
Balgray, Tealing War Memorial				56°31′58″N 2°58′12″W	Category C(S)	17447	Upload another image See more images
Mill Of Tealing, Road Bridge Over Tealing Burn				56°32′00″N 2°57′22″W	Category C(S)	17454	Upload Photo
Kirkton Of Tealing, Former Tealing Parish Church Hearse House				56°31′47″N 2°58′17″W	Category B	17451	Upload Photo
South Balluderon Farm, Steading Including Stackyard Walls, Implement Shed, Field Trough And Mill Dam With Walls				56°31′51″N 3°01′02″W	Category A	17458	Upload Photo
Tealing House, Tealing Home Farm, Old Mill				56°31′56″N 2°57′22″W	Category C(S)	18990	Upload Photo
Balkello, Smithy Cottage				56°31′53″N 3°01′04″W	Category C(S)	17448	Upload Photo
Balkemback Farm, Farmhouse				56°31′51″N 2°59′26″W	Category C(S)	17449	Upload Photo
Kirkton Of Tealing, Old Manse, Gig House And Stable				56°31′48″N 2°58′14″W	Category C(S)	17452	Upload Photo
Tealing House, Tealing Home Farm, Road Bridge Over Tealing Burn				56°31′52″N 2°57′24″W	Category C(S)	18991	Upload Photo
Kirkton Of Tealing, Former Tealing Parish Church, Including Churchyard				56°31′47″N 2°58′17″W	Category A	17450	Upload another image
South Balluderon Farm, Cottage And Former Bothy, Including Garden Walls				56°31′50″N 3°00′58″W	Category B	17456	Upload Photo
Tealing House, Tealing Home Farm, Ice House On E Bank Of Tealing Burn				56°31′54″N 2°57′23″W	Category B	18989	Upload Photo
Balgray, Back Law, Road Bridge Over The Burn Near Junction Of School And Huntingfaulds Roads				56°32′13″N 2°57′49″W	Category C(S)	17443	Upload Photo
Balgray, Back Law, Road Bridge Over Tealing Burn				56°32′08″N 2°58′00″W	Category C(S)	17444	Upload Photo

== Key ==
The scheme for classifying buildings in Scotland is:

- Category A: "buildings of national or international importance, either architectural or historic; or fine, little-altered examples of some particular period, style or building type."
- Category B: "buildings of regional or more than local importance; or major examples of some particular period, style or building type, which may have been altered."
- Category C: "buildings of local importance; lesser examples of any period, style, or building type, as originally constructed or moderately altered; and simple traditional buildings which group well with other listed buildings."

In March 2016 there were 47,288 listed buildings in Scotland. Of these, 8% were Category A, and 50% were Category B, with the remaining 42% being Category C.

== See also ==
- List of listed buildings in Angus
