= List of listed buildings in Maryton, Angus =

This is a list of listed buildings in the parish of Maryton in Angus, Scotland.

== List ==
Name	Location	Date Listed	Grid Ref. (Note: Sometimes known as OSGB36, the grid reference (where provided) is based on the British national grid reference system used by the Ordnance Survey. • "Guide to National Grid". Ordnance Survey. • "Get-a-map". Ordnance Survey.)	Geo-coordinates	Notes	LB Number (Note: Historic Environment Scotland assign a unique alphanumeric identifier to each designated site in Scotland, for listed buildings this always begins with "LB", for example "LB12345".)	Image
Old Montrose - Steading				56°42′15″N 2°32′24″W	Category C(S)	18238	Upload Photo
Old Montrose, Walled Garden, Garden Buildings, And Gardener's Cottage				56°42′15″N 2°32′15″W	Category B	50233	Upload Photo
Old Montrose House With Gatepiers And Wing Walls To East Drive				56°42′14″N 2°32′12″W	Category C(S)	50235	Upload Photo
Haugh Bridge Over Old Montrose Burn				56°42′16″N 2°31′56″W	Category C(S)	18235	Upload Photo
Old Montrose - Gatepiers				56°42′17″N 2°32′03″W	Category B	18237	Upload Photo
Barnhead Farmhouse				56°42′29″N 2°32′49″W	Category B	18239	Upload Photo
Old Montrose House - Grieve's Cottage				56°42′19″N 2°32′15″W	Category B	18236	Upload Photo
Bonnyton Farm - Threshing Mill				56°41′31″N 2°33′17″W	Category C(S)	18241	Upload Photo
Maryton Parish Kirk				56°41′41″N 2°31′04″W	Category B	19867	Upload another image See more images
Parish Kirk Manse Now "Annfield House"				56°41′42″N 2°30′57″W	Category B	18234	Upload Photo
Barnhead Bridge Over Little Pow Burn				56°42′37″N 2°33′06″W	Category C(S)	18240	Upload Photo

== Key ==
The scheme for classifying buildings in Scotland is:

- Category A: "buildings of national or international importance, either architectural or historic; or fine, little-altered examples of some particular period, style or building type."
- Category B: "buildings of regional or more than local importance; or major examples of some particular period, style or building type, which may have been altered."
- Category C: "buildings of local importance; lesser examples of any period, style, or building type, as originally constructed or moderately altered; and simple traditional buildings which group well with other listed buildings."

In March 2016 there were 47,288 listed buildings in Scotland. Of these, 8% were Category A, and 50% were Category B, with the remaining 42% being Category C.

== See also ==
- List of listed buildings in Angus
