= List of listed buildings in Stracathro, Angus =

This is a list of listed buildings in the parish of Stracathro in Angus, Scotland.

== List ==
Name	Location	Date Listed	Grid Ref. (Note: Sometimes known as OSGB36, the grid reference (where provided) is based on the British national grid reference system used by the Ordnance Survey. • "Guide to National Grid". Ordnance Survey. • "Get-a-map". Ordnance Survey.)	Geo-coordinates	Notes	LB Number (Note: Historic Environment Scotland assign a unique alphanumeric identifier to each designated site in Scotland, for listed buildings this always begins with "LB", for example "LB12345".)	Image
Footbridge S.W Of Stracathro House				56°46′46″N 2°36′58″W	Category B	17779	Upload Photo
Parish Churchyard				56°46′54″N 2°37′40″W	Category C(S)	17790	Upload Photo
Inchbare, Former Corn Mill				56°46′57″N 2°38′48″W	Category B	17796	Upload Photo
Dunlappie East Gate And Lodge				56°48′02″N 2°40′20″W	Category C(S)	17800	Upload Photo
Newtonmill House Walled Garden Dovecot				56°46′05″N 2°38′41″W	Category B	19825	Upload Photo
Manse Bridge Over Cruick Water				56°46′44″N 2°37′41″W	Category C(S)	19827	Upload another image
Footbridge Over Cruick Water And Flight Of Steps N. Of Stracathro House				56°46′51″N 2°36′55″W	Category C(S)	17780	Upload Photo
Newtonmill House Lodge And Gates				56°46′08″N 2°38′39″W	Category B	17781	Upload Photo
Manse Of Stracathro - Gatepiers				56°46′42″N 2°37′39″W	Category C(S)	17793	Upload Photo
Newtonmill House Cottage				56°46′07″N 2°38′45″W	Category B	17809	Upload Photo
Priestoun, With Adjoining Walls And Gates				56°32′09″N 2°59′20″W	Category B	17801	Upload Photo
Parish Church				56°46′55″N 2°37′40″W	Category C(S)	19826	Upload another image See more images
Stracathro House (Staff Residence Of Stracathro Hospital)				56°46′48″N 2°36′51″W	Category A	17803	Upload another image See more images
Stracathro House Walled Garden				56°46′45″N 2°37′11″W	Category B	17805	Upload Photo
Newtonmill Bridge Over Keithock Burn				56°46′10″N 2°38′33″W	Category B	17778	Upload Photo
Manse Of Stracathro				56°46′42″N 2°37′34″W	Category C(S)	17791	Upload Photo
Dalhousie Bridge Over West Water				56°48′04″N 2°40′12″W	Category C(S)	17802	Upload Photo
Stracathro House Statue E. Of Walled Garden				56°46′46″N 2°37′06″W	Category C(S)	17806	Upload Photo
Newtonmill, Farm House				56°46′05″N 2°38′52″W	Category C(S)	17811	Upload Photo
Newtonmill, Farm Cottage				56°46′04″N 2°38′52″W	Category C(S)	17812	Upload Photo
Newtonmill, Mill House				56°46′07″N 2°38′50″W	Category C(S)	17784	Upload Photo
Dunlappie With Adjoining Walls And Gates				56°48′02″N 2°40′33″W	Category C(S)	17799	Upload Photo
Stracathro House Stables				56°46′49″N 2°37′03″W	Category A	17804	Upload Photo
Stracathro House Gatepiers Of Brechin North Water Bridge Road				56°46′23″N 2°36′43″W	Category B	17807	Upload Photo
Newtonmill House With Screen Wall Adjoining On West				56°46′07″N 2°38′44″W	Category B	17808	Upload Photo
Newtonmill, East Mill (Mr. Kennoway's)				56°46′09″N 2°38′49″W	Category C(S)	17810	Upload Photo
Newtonmill House Walled Garden				56°46′06″N 2°38′43″W	Category C(S)	19829	Upload Photo
Newtonmill House Garages And Newtonmill Farm Steading (E. Part Usher And W. Parts Mr. Kennoway)				56°46′07″N 2°38′45″W	Category B	17782	Upload Photo
Manse Of Stracathro - Outbuildings				56°46′44″N 2°37′33″W	Category C(S)	17792	Upload Photo
Millden Bridge Over Cruick Water				56°46′51″N 2°37′11″W	Category C(S)	17795	Upload Photo
West Water Bridge Over West Water At Inchbare				56°47′01″N 2°38′43″W	Category B	17797	Upload Photo
Stracathro House Engineer's House				56°46′43″N 2°37′19″W	Category C(S)	19828	Upload Photo
Newtonmill, West Mill (Usher)				56°46′07″N 2°38′50″W	Category C(S)	17783	Upload Photo
Store, West Of Mill House				56°46′06″N 2°38′51″W	Category C(S)	17785	Upload Photo
Millden				56°46′52″N 2°37′09″W	Category B	17794	Upload Photo
Auchenreoch				56°46′50″N 2°39′20″W	Category B	17798	Upload Photo

== Key ==
The scheme for classifying buildings in Scotland is:

- Category A: "buildings of national or international importance, either architectural or historic; or fine, little-altered examples of some particular period, style or building type."
- Category B: "buildings of regional or more than local importance; or major examples of some particular period, style or building type, which may have been altered."
- Category C: "buildings of local importance; lesser examples of any period, style, or building type, as originally constructed or moderately altered; and simple traditional buildings which group well with other listed buildings."

In March 2016 there were 47,288 listed buildings in Scotland. Of these, 8% were Category A, and 50% were Category B, with the remaining 42% being Category C.

== See also ==
- List of listed buildings in Angus
