= List of listed buildings in Murroes, Angus =

This is a list of listed buildings in the parish of Murroes in Angus, Scotland.

== List ==
Name	Location	Date Listed	Grid Ref. (Note: Sometimes known as OSGB36, the grid reference (where provided) is based on the British national grid reference system used by the Ordnance Survey. • "Guide to National Grid". Ordnance Survey. • "Get-a-map". Ordnance Survey.)	Geo-coordinates	Notes	LB Number (Note: Historic Environment Scotland assign a unique alphanumeric identifier to each designated site in Scotland, for listed buildings this always begins with "LB", for example "LB12345".)	Image
Gagie, Gagie House, Summerhouse				56°31′37″N 2°53′48″W	Category A	19004	Upload Photo
Gagie, Gagie Lodge, Road Bridge Over Burn				56°31′07″N 2°53′29″W	Category C(S)	19007	Upload Photo
Murroes, Murroes And Tealing Parish Church, Church Hall (Formerly Manse Stable And Coach House)				56°30′18″N 2°52′38″W	Category C(S)	19014	Upload Photo
Murroes, Murroes Primary School, Former School House, Including Boundary Wall				56°30′57″N 2°54′18″W	Category C(S)	19016	Upload Photo
Westhall Farm, Cartshed And Granary				56°30′17″N 2°53′19″W	Category B	19022	Upload Photo
Ballumbie, 2 And 2A Ballumbie Gardens, Centre Cottage				56°29′48″N 2°54′05″W	Category C(S)	18661	Upload Photo
Duntrune, Duntrune Home Farm, The Steading				56°30′15″N 2°54′19″W	Category B	18668	Upload Photo
Kellas, Old School House				56°30′46″N 2°53′13″W	Category C(S)	17460	Upload Photo
Gagie, Gagie House				56°31′37″N 2°53′49″W	Category A	19001	Upload Photo
Wellbank, Little Gagie Farm, Aqueduct, Including Embankment				56°31′43″N 2°52′46″W	Category B	19021	Upload Photo
Westhall Terrace, Road Bridge Over Murroes Burn				56°31′22″N 2°54′20″W	Category C(S)	19025	Upload Photo
Ballumbie, 2 And 2A Ballumbie Gardens, West Cottage				56°29′48″N 2°54′05″W	Category B	18663	Upload Photo
Gagie, Gagie Lodge, Aqueduct, Including Embankment				56°31′09″N 2°53′33″W	Category B	19006	Upload Photo
Kellas, Saw Mill And Cottage				56°30′37″N 2°52′57″W	Category C(S)	19008	Upload Photo
Murroes, Murroes And Tealing Parish Church, Churchyard, Including Walls And Gatepiers				56°30′17″N 2°52′36″W	Category B	19013	Upload Photo
Westhall Farm, Old Farmhouse				56°30′16″N 2°53′23″W	Category C(S)	19024	Upload Photo
Ballumbie, 2 And 2A Ballumbie Gardens, East Cottages				56°29′49″N 2°54′04″W	Category C(S)	18662	Upload Photo
Burnside Of Duntrune, 6/7, 8 And 9 Burnside Of Duntrune, Including Boundary Wall And Railings				56°30′09″N 2°54′41″W	Category C(S)	18667	Upload Photo
Burnside Of Duntrune, Weir Abutting Road Bridge Over Fithie Burn				56°30′11″N 2°54′38″W	Category B	18997	Upload Photo
Gagie, Gagie Filters, Gagie Well, Including Filter Beds, Gatepier And Boundary Wall				56°31′26″N 2°53′13″W	Category B	18998	Upload Photo
Murroes, Murroes Farm, Including Steading, Mill, Farmhouse And Outhouse				56°30′17″N 2°52′29″W	Category B	19009	Upload Photo
Murroes, Murroes Farm, Dovecot				56°30′17″N 2°52′34″W	Category B	19010	Upload Photo
Whitehouse Farm, Farmhouse				56°32′19″N 2°55′49″W	Category C(S)	19026	Upload Photo
Burnside Of Duntrune, Duntrune House, Walled Garden				56°30′14″N 2°54′14″W	Category C(S)	18994	Upload Photo
Burnside Of Duntrune, Highbroom				56°30′29″N 2°54′36″W	Category C(S)	18995	Upload Photo
Gagie, Gagie House, Coach House/Stable Block				56°31′37″N 2°53′53″W	Category B	19002	Upload Photo
Gagie, Gagie House, Gatepiers And Adjoining Walls				56°31′34″N 2°53′52″W	Category B	19003	Upload Photo
Murroes War Memorial, Including Enclosing Wall				56°30′59″N 2°54′20″W	Category C(S)	19084	Upload Photo
Ballumbie, Ballumbie House, Walled Garden				56°29′55″N 2°54′06″W	Category C(S)	18665	Upload Photo
Burnside Of Duntrune, Aqueduct Over Fithie Burn, Including Embankment				56°30′11″N 2°54′47″W	Category B	18666	Upload Photo
Burnside Of Duntrune, Duntrune House, Including Ha-Ha, Terrace Steps, Wall With Bee-Boles, And Gatepiers With Adjoining Walls				56°30′13″N 2°54′09″W	Category B	18669	Upload Photo
Gagie, Gagie Home Farm, Farmhouse At No 3 Holding				56°31′36″N 2°53′59″W	Category C(S)	18999	Upload Photo
Gagie, Gagie Home Farm, Steading				56°31′37″N 2°54′00″W	Category B	19000	Upload Photo
Murroes, Murroes Primary School, Including Play Sheds, Detached Classroom And Boundary Wall				56°30′58″N 2°54′18″W	Category C(S)	19015	Upload Photo
Ballumbie, Ballumbie House				56°29′56″N 2°53′58″W	Category B	18664	Upload Photo
Ballumbie, Ballumbie Castle				56°29′57″N 2°54′03″W	Category B	19482	Upload Photo
Burnside Of Duntrune, Road Bridge Over Fithie Burn, Including Adjoining Walls And Milestone				56°30′10″N 2°54′38″W	Category B	18996	Upload Photo
Gagie, Gagie House Walled Garden And Sundial				56°31′36″N 2°53′50″W	Category B	19005	Upload Photo
Murroes, Murroes House, Including Boundary Wall And Out Buildings				56°30′15″N 2°52′37″W	Category A	19011	Upload Photo
Murroes, Murroes And Tealing Parish Church				56°30′17″N 2°52′36″W	Category B	19012	Upload Photo
Murroes, Road Bridge Over Murroes Burn				56°30′14″N 2°52′34″W	Category B	19017	Upload Photo
Westhall Farm, Farmhouse, Including Boundary Walls				56°30′15″N 2°53′22″W	Category B	19023	Upload Photo

== Key ==
The scheme for classifying buildings in Scotland is:

- Category A: "buildings of national or international importance, either architectural or historic; or fine, little-altered examples of some particular period, style or building type."
- Category B: "buildings of regional or more than local importance; or major examples of some particular period, style or building type, which may have been altered."
- Category C: "buildings of local importance; lesser examples of any period, style, or building type, as originally constructed or moderately altered; and simple traditional buildings which group well with other listed buildings."

In March 2016 there were 47,288 listed buildings in Scotland. Of these, 8% were Category A, and 50% were Category B, with the remaining 42% being Category C.

== See also ==
- List of listed buildings in Angus
