= List of listed buildings in Airlie, Angus =

This is a list of listed buildings in the parish of Airlie in Angus, Scotland.

== List ==
Name	Location	Date Listed	Grid Ref. (Note: Sometimes known as OSGB36, the grid reference (where provided) is based on the British national grid reference system used by the Ordnance Survey. • "Guide to National Grid". Ordnance Survey. • "Get-a-map". Ordnance Survey.)	Geo-coordinates	Notes	LB Number (Note: Historic Environment Scotland assign a unique alphanumeric identifier to each designated site in Scotland, for listed buildings this always begins with "LB", for example "LB12345".)	Image
Braideston Mill				56°36′52″N 3°06′07″W	Category C(S)	4614	Upload Photo
Bridge Of Dean Over Dean Water				56°35′56″N 3°09′49″W	Category C(S)	4615	Upload Photo
Parish Kirk Manse And Gig-House				56°39′01″N 3°07′16″W	Category C(S)	4624	Upload Photo
Old Schoolhouse, Baitland				56°38′19″N 3°07′00″W	Category C(S)	4611	Upload Photo
Old Free Kirk, Airlie				56°37′51″N 3°05′09″W	Category B	4612	Upload another image
Parish Kirk - Ministers Aisle				56°39′01″N 3°07′19″W	Category B	4622	Upload Photo
Airlie Parish Kirkyard				56°39′01″N 3°07′18″W	Category B	4623	Upload another image See more images
Barns Of Airlie Earth-House				56°39′02″N 3°08′02″W	Category B	4627	Upload Photo
Airlie Castle - Stables				56°39′17″N 3°09′05″W	Category B	4629	Upload Photo
Bridge Of Dillavaird Over River Isla				56°38′30″N 3°09′01″W	Category B	4630	Upload another image See more images
Parish Kirk - Hearse-House				56°39′02″N 3°07′20″W	Category C(S)	4626	Upload Photo
Coockston Bridge Over Dean Water				56°37′07″N 3°04′40″W	Category B	4617	Upload another image
Airlie Parish Kirk				56°39′02″N 3°07′18″W	Category A	4621	Upload another image See more images
Parish Kirk Manse - "St. Medan"				56°39′00″N 3°07′17″W	Category C(S)	4625	Upload Photo
Moberty (Former Manse)				56°37′50″N 3°05′11″W	Category C(S)	4613	Upload Photo
Airlie Castle				56°39′21″N 3°09′19″W	Category B	4628	Upload Photo
Old Bridge Of Dean Over Dean Water				56°35′58″N 3°09′41″W	Category B	4616	Upload Photo

== Key ==
The scheme for classifying buildings in Scotland is:

- Category A: "buildings of national or international importance, either architectural or historic; or fine, little-altered examples of some particular period, style or building type."
- Category B: "buildings of regional or more than local importance; or major examples of some particular period, style or building type, which may have been altered."
- Category C: "buildings of local importance; lesser examples of any period, style, or building type, as originally constructed or moderately altered; and simple traditional buildings which group well with other listed buildings."

In March 2016 there were 47,288 listed buildings in Scotland. Of these, 8% were Category A, and 50% were Category B, with the remaining 42% being Category C.

== See also ==
- List of listed buildings in Angus
