= List of listed buildings in Farnell, Angus =

This is a list of listed buildings in the parish of Farnell in Angus, Scotland.

== List ==
Name	Location	Date Listed	Grid Ref. (Note: Sometimes known as OSGB36, the grid reference (where provided) is based on the British national grid reference system used by the Ordnance Survey. • "Guide to National Grid". Ordnance Survey. • "Get-a-map". Ordnance Survey.)	Geo-coordinates	Notes	LB Number (Note: Historic Environment Scotland assign a unique alphanumeric identifier to each designated site in Scotland, for listed buildings this always begins with "LB", for example "LB12345".)	Image
Kinnaird Park - Private Burial Ground				56°41′50″N 2°35′52″W	Category B	13766	Upload Photo
Kinnaird Park - Wood Cottage				56°42′32″N 2°36′27″W	Category C(S)	13767	Upload Photo
Kinnaird Castle - Flora Statue				56°42′15″N 2°35′59″W	Category B	11510	Upload Photo
Little Fithie - Old Farmhouse				56°40′58″N 2°36′59″W	Category C(S)	11504	Upload Photo
Farnell Mill				56°41′23″N 2°36′42″W	Category B	11503	Upload Photo
Farnell Road Bridge Over Pow Burn				56°41′19″N 2°36′27″W	Category B	11505	Upload another image
Parish Kirk Manse				56°41′20″N 2°36′39″W	Category B	11498	Upload Photo
Farnell Castle - Doocot				56°41′19″N 2°36′48″W	Category B	11502	Upload Photo
Kinnaird Castle				56°42′16″N 2°35′57″W	Category B	11508	Upload another image
Kinnaird Castle - Garden Gate And Walls				56°42′14″N 2°35′59″W	Category B	11509	Upload Photo
Railway Bridge Over Farnell Road				56°41′16″N 2°36′24″W	Category C(S)	13765	Upload Photo
Farnell Parish Kirk				56°41′21″N 2°36′36″W	Category A	11497	Upload another image
Manse - Sundial				56°41′19″N 2°36′39″W	Category B	11499	Upload Photo
Haughs Of Kinnaird Farmhouse				56°42′27″N 2°34′50″W	Category C(S)	11507	Upload Photo
Kinnaird Park - Gazebo Also Known As "Montrose View"				56°42′27″N 2°36′16″W	Category C(S)	11511	Upload Photo
Kinnaird Park - Over-Bridge				56°42′35″N 2°36′16″W	Category C(S)	11512	Upload Photo
Kinnaird Park - Sundial				56°42′35″N 2°36′19″W	Category B	11513	Upload Photo
Kinnaird Park - Old Parish Kirkyard				56°42′06″N 2°36′33″W	Category C(S)	11514	Upload Photo
Manse - Gatepiers				56°41′20″N 2°36′40″W	Category B	11500	Upload Photo
Farnell Castle				56°41′23″N 2°36′54″W	Category A	11501	Upload Photo
Powmill Farmhouse				56°41′30″N 2°35′59″W	Category C(S)	11506	Upload Photo

== Key ==
The scheme for classifying buildings in Scotland is:

- Category A: "buildings of national or international importance, either architectural or historic; or fine, little-altered examples of some particular period, style or building type."
- Category B: "buildings of regional or more than local importance; or major examples of some particular period, style or building type, which may have been altered."
- Category C: "buildings of local importance; lesser examples of any period, style, or building type, as originally constructed or moderately altered; and simple traditional buildings which group well with other listed buildings."

In March 2016 there were 47,288 listed buildings in Scotland. Of these, 8% were Category A, and 50% were Category B, with the remaining 42% being Category C.

== See also ==
- List of listed buildings in Angus
