= List of listed buildings in Careston, Angus =

This is a list of listed buildings in the parish of Careston, in Angus, Scotland.

== List ==
Name	Location	Date Listed	Grid Ref. (Note: Sometimes known as OSGB36, the grid reference (where provided) is based on the British national grid reference system used by the Ordnance Survey. • "Guide to National Grid". Ordnance Survey. • "Get-a-map". Ordnance Survey.)	Geo-coordinates	Notes	LB Number (Note: Historic Environment Scotland assign a unique alphanumeric identifier to each designated site in Scotland, for listed buildings this always begins with "LB", for example "LB12345".)	Image
Manse - Stables				56°43′57″N 2°46′24″W	Category C(S)	4655	Upload Photo
Careston - Doocot				56°43′48″N 2°45′52″W	Category B	4658	Upload Photo
Careston - South Gates				56°43′10″N 2°45′53″W	Category B	4660	Upload Photo
Kirkyard Walls				56°43′56″N 2°46′21″W	Category B	4662	Upload Photo
Careston - North Lodge				56°44′00″N 2°45′47″W	Category B	4659	Upload Photo
Parish Kirk Manse				56°43′56″N 2°46′25″W	Category C(S)	4663	Upload Photo
Careston Parish Kirk				56°43′56″N 2°46′21″W	Category B	4661	Upload Photo
Careston - Old Gates				56°43′44″N 2°46′09″W	Category B	4657	Upload Photo
Careston Castle				56°43′42″N 2°46′07″W	Category A	4656	Upload another image

== Key ==
The scheme for classifying buildings in Scotland is:

- Category A: "buildings of national or international importance, either architectural or historic; or fine, little-altered examples of some particular period, style or building type."
- Category B: "buildings of regional or more than local importance; or major examples of some particular period, style or building type, which may have been altered."
- Category C: "buildings of local importance; lesser examples of any period, style, or building type, as originally constructed or moderately altered; and simple traditional buildings which group well with other listed buildings."

In March 2016 there were 47,288 listed buildings in Scotland. Of these, 8% were Category A, and 50% were Category B, with the remaining 42% being Category C.

== See also ==
- List of listed buildings in Angus
