= List of listed buildings in Dunnichen, Angus =

This is a list of listed buildings in the parish of Dunnichen in Angus, Scotland.

== List ==
Name	Location	Date Listed	Grid Ref. (Note: Sometimes known as OSGB36, the grid reference (where provided) is based on the British national grid reference system used by the Ordnance Survey. • "Guide to National Grid". Ordnance Survey. • "Get-a-map". Ordnance Survey.)	Geo-coordinates	Notes	LB Number (Note: Historic Environment Scotland assign a unique alphanumeric identifier to each designated site in Scotland, for listed buildings this always begins with "LB", for example "LB12345".)	Image
Hall Of Letham, The Square				56°37′45″N 2°46′10″W	Category C(S)	4605	Upload Photo
Old Church, Off The Square, Letham				56°37′42″N 2°46′05″W	Category C(S)	4606	Upload Photo
Letham, 21 The Den, Blunt Neuk				56°37′38″N 2°45′45″W	Category C(S)	6469	Upload Photo
Craichie Old Cornmill				56°36′37″N 2°48′35″W	Category C(S)	4601	Upload another image
Letham Den Cottages				56°37′40″N 2°45′41″W	Category C(S)	4607	Upload Photo
Parish Kirk Manse				56°37′39″N 2°48′01″W	Category B	4619	Upload Photo
Dunnichen Parish Kirk				56°37′42″N 2°48′04″W	Category B	4618	Upload another image
Bractullo Bridge Over Bractullomill Burn				56°36′20″N 2°47′01″W	Category C(S)	4604	Upload Photo
Letham Den Bridge Over Vinny Water				56°37′37″N 2°45′44″W	Category B	4608	Upload Photo
20 Blairs Road				56°37′36″N 2°46′29″W	Category C(S)	4610	Upload Photo
7 Braehead Road				56°37′27″N 2°46′03″W	Category C(S)	4609	Upload Photo
Craichie Mill Farmhouse				56°36′36″N 2°48′37″W	Category C(S)	4620	Upload Photo

== Key ==
The scheme for classifying buildings in Scotland is:

- Category A: "buildings of national or international importance, either architectural or historic; or fine, little-altered examples of some particular period, style or building type."
- Category B: "buildings of regional or more than local importance; or major examples of some particular period, style or building type, which may have been altered."
- Category C: "buildings of local importance; lesser examples of any period, style, or building type, as originally constructed or moderately altered; and simple traditional buildings which group well with other listed buildings."

In March 2016 there were 47,288 listed buildings in Scotland. Of these, 8% were Category A, and 50% were Category B, with the remaining 42% being Category C.

== See also ==
- List of listed buildings in Angus
