= List of listed buildings in Guthrie, Angus =

This is a list of listed buildings in the parish of Guthrie in Angus, Scotland.

== List ==
Name	Location	Date Listed	Grid Ref. (Note: Sometimes known as OSGB36, the grid reference (where provided) is based on the British national grid reference system used by the Ordnance Survey. • "Guide to National Grid". Ordnance Survey. • "Get-a-map". Ordnance Survey.)	Geo-coordinates	Notes	LB Number (Note: Historic Environment Scotland assign a unique alphanumeric identifier to each designated site in Scotland, for listed buildings this always begins with "LB", for example "LB12345".)	Image
Parish Kirk Manse				56°38′37″N 2°42′23″W	Category C(S)	13750	Upload Photo
Guthrie Parish Kirk				56°38′38″N 2°42′25″W	Category B	11375	Upload Photo
Kirkyard Gateway And Enclosing Walls				56°38′38″N 2°42′27″W	Category B	11377	Upload Photo
Guthrie Burial Aisle				56°38′38″N 2°42′25″W	Category B	11376	Upload Photo
Smithy House, The Kirkton				56°38′38″N 2°42′27″W	Category C(S)	11378	Upload Photo
Cottages North Of Wheelwright's House				56°38′51″N 2°42′33″W	Category B	11381	Upload Photo
Guthrie Castle - Old Garden Gate				56°38′40″N 2°42′55″W	Category B	11384	Upload Photo
Wheelwright's House, Cotton Of Guthrie				56°38′50″N 2°42′32″W	Category B	11380	Upload Photo
Guthrie Castle				56°38′38″N 2°42′55″W	Category B	11382	Upload Photo
Guthrie Castle - Wall Gardens				56°38′42″N 2°42′55″W	Category B	11383	Upload Photo
Guthrie Castle - East Gateway				56°38′39″N 2°42′29″W	Category C(S)	11379	Upload Photo
Guthrie Castle - Sundial				56°38′39″N 2°42′57″W	Category B	11385	Upload Photo

== Key ==
The scheme for classifying buildings in Scotland is:

- Category A: "buildings of national or international importance, either architectural or historic; or fine, little-altered examples of some particular period, style or building type."
- Category B: "buildings of regional or more than local importance; or major examples of some particular period, style or building type, which may have been altered."
- Category C: "buildings of local importance; lesser examples of any period, style, or building type, as originally constructed or moderately altered; and simple traditional buildings which group well with other listed buildings."

In March 2016 there were 47,288 listed buildings in Scotland. Of these, 8% were Category A, and 50% were Category B, with the remaining 42% being Category C.

== See also ==
- List of listed buildings in Angus
