= List of listed buildings in Ruthven, Angus =

This is a list of listed buildings in the parish of Ruthven in Angus, Scotland.

== List ==
Name	Location	Date Listed	Grid Ref. (Note: Sometimes known as OSGB36, the grid reference (where provided) is based on the British national grid reference system used by the Ordnance Survey. • "Guide to National Grid". Ordnance Survey. • "Get-a-map". Ordnance Survey.)	Geo-coordinates	Notes	LB Number (Note: Historic Environment Scotland assign a unique alphanumeric identifier to each designated site in Scotland, for listed buildings this always begins with "LB", for example "LB12345".)	Image
Ruthven Parish Kirk				56°37′34″N 3°09′58″W	Category C(S)	17599	Upload another image See more images
Old Post Office Ruthven				56°37′31″N 3°09′48″W	Category C(S)	17602	Upload Photo
Ruthven House - Ice House				56°37′05″N 3°08′20″W	Category C(S)	19806	Upload Photo
Ruthven Castle				56°37′04″N 3°08′20″W	Category B	17598	Upload Photo
Ruthven Bridge Over River Isla				56°37′35″N 3°09′35″W	Category B	17600	Upload another image See more images
Bridgend Cottage Ruthven				56°37′35″N 3°09′33″W	Category C(S)	17601	Upload Photo
Milton Of Ruthven Farmhouse				56°37′30″N 3°09′15″W	Category C(S)	17596	Upload Photo
Kirk House Barn				56°37′33″N 3°10′03″W	Category C(S)	17603	Upload Photo
Ruthven Old Bridge Over River Isla				56°37′35″N 3°09′35″W	Category B	19807	Upload Photo

== Key ==
The scheme for classifying buildings in Scotland is:

- Category A: "buildings of national or international importance, either architectural or historic; or fine, little-altered examples of some particular period, style or building type."
- Category B: "buildings of regional or more than local importance; or major examples of some particular period, style or building type, which may have been altered."
- Category C: "buildings of local importance; lesser examples of any period, style, or building type, as originally constructed or moderately altered; and simple traditional buildings which group well with other listed buildings."

In March 2016 there were 47,288 listed buildings in Scotland. Of these, 8% were Category A, and 50% were Category B, with the remaining 42% being Category C.

== See also ==
- List of listed buildings in Angus
