= List of listed buildings in Tannadice, Angus =

This is a list of listed buildings in the parish of Tannadice in Angus, Scotland.

== List ==
Name	Location	Date Listed	Grid Ref. (Note: Sometimes known as OSGB36, the grid reference (where provided) is based on the British national grid reference system used by the Ordnance Survey. • "Guide to National Grid". Ordnance Survey. • "Get-a-map". Ordnance Survey.)	Geo-coordinates	Notes	LB Number (Note: Historic Environment Scotland assign a unique alphanumeric identifier to each designated site in Scotland, for listed buildings this always begins with "LB", for example "LB12345".)	Image
Marcus - Miller's House				56°43′27″N 2°47′16″W	Category C(S)	18033	Upload Photo
Memus Church				56°43′08″N 2°56′16″W	Category B	18039	Upload another image
Wester Memus Farmhouse				56°43′28″N 2°55′48″W	Category B	18041	Upload Photo
Kirkton Cottages Opposite Old School (Now 2 Cottages)				56°42′45″N 2°51′36″W	Category C(S)	18024	Upload Photo
"Burnside Cottage", Kirkton Of Tannadice				56°42′48″N 2°51′39″W	Category B	18026	Upload Photo
Turfachie Farmhouse				56°42′49″N 2°57′11″W	Category C(S)	18037	Upload Photo
3 `Kennedy Well' Stand Pumps, Tannadice Village				56°42′45″N 2°51′36″W	Category C(S)	49887	Upload Photo
Easter Memus Farmhouse				56°43′33″N 2°55′31″W	Category B	18010	Upload Photo
Mains Of Ogil - Old Cornmill				56°44′33″N 2°54′07″W	Category B	18017	Upload Photo
Tannadice Parish Kirk				56°42′41″N 2°51′32″W	Category C(S)	18022	Upload Photo
Mains Of Ogil - Wheel-House				56°44′33″N 2°54′07″W	Category B	47427	Upload Photo
Cortachy Castle - Private Burial Ground				56°43′33″N 2°59′15″W	Category C(S)	18011	Upload Photo
Tannadice - Sundial				56°42′27″N 2°50′34″W	Category B	18030	Upload Photo
Downiepark - Sundial				56°42′53″N 2°58′04″W	Category B	18035	Upload Photo
Memus Old Manse				56°43′08″N 2°56′15″W	Category B	18040	Upload Photo
Finavon, Former Blacksmith's Workshop And Dwelling				56°42′25″N 2°49′40″W	Category C(S)	44924	Upload Photo
Cortachy - East Mill Cottage				56°43′18″N 2°58′43″W	Category C(S)	18012	Upload Photo
Justinhaugh Bridge				56°42′08″N 2°52′51″W	Category B	18018	Upload another image See more images
Parish Kirk Manse				56°42′43″N 2°51′33″W	Category C(S)	18023	Upload Photo
Inshewan House				56°42′02″N 2°54′17″W	Category B	18027	Upload Photo
Tannadice House (6 Flats)				56°42′29″N 2°50′26″W	Category B	18029	Upload Photo
Turfachie Bridge Over White Burn				56°42′51″N 2°56′22″W	Category C(S)	18038	Upload Photo
Water Pump And Enclosing Wall, B937, Near Tannadice Village				56°42′32″N 2°50′55″W	Category C(S)	49888	Upload Photo
Ronty Bridge Over White Burn, At Newmill Of Inshewam				56°44′12″N 2°56′39″W	Category C(S)	18014	Upload Photo
Kirkton Bridge Over Bogburn				56°42′45″N 2°51′37″W	Category C(S)	18025	Upload Photo
Inshewan - Farm Steading				56°42′06″N 2°54′22″W	Category B	18028	Upload Photo
Downie Park House				56°42′54″N 2°58′04″W	Category A	18034	Upload Photo
Downie Park - Stables And Steading				56°43′00″N 2°58′02″W	Category B	18036	Upload Photo
Tannadice, Broomhill Road/South Esk Road, K6 Telephone Kiosk				56°42′46″N 2°51′33″W	Category B	19203	Upload Photo
Kinalty Farmhouse				56°44′03″N 2°59′08″W	Category C(S)	18013	Upload Photo
Sealywell Cottage Glenquiech				56°44′44″N 2°57′28″W	Category B	18015	Upload Photo
Mains Of Ogil Farmhouse				56°44′32″N 2°54′08″W	Category B	18016	Upload Photo
Nether Balgillo Farmhouse				56°42′58″N 2°50′16″W	Category C(S)	18031	Upload Photo
Marcus Mill				56°43′27″N 2°47′17″W	Category C(S)	18032	Upload Photo

== Key ==
The scheme for classifying buildings in Scotland is:

- Category A: "buildings of national or international importance, either architectural or historic; or fine, little-altered examples of some particular period, style or building type."
- Category B: "buildings of regional or more than local importance; or major examples of some particular period, style or building type, which may have been altered."
- Category C: "buildings of local importance; lesser examples of any period, style, or building type, as originally constructed or moderately altered; and simple traditional buildings which group well with other listed buildings."

In March 2016 there were 47,288 listed buildings in Scotland. Of these, 8% were Category A, and 50% were Category B, with the remaining 42% being Category C.

== See also ==
- List of listed buildings in Angus
