= List of listed buildings in Barry, Angus =

This is a list of listed buildings in the parish of Barry in Angus, Scotland.

== List ==
Name	Location	Date Listed	Grid Ref. (Note: Sometimes known as OSGB36, the grid reference (where provided) is based on the British national grid reference system used by the Ordnance Survey. • "Guide to National Grid". Ordnance Survey. • "Get-a-map". Ordnance Survey.)	Geo-coordinates	Notes	LB Number (Note: Historic Environment Scotland assign a unique alphanumeric identifier to each designated site in Scotland, for listed buildings this always begins with "LB", for example "LB12345".)	Image
Woodhill House - Doocot				56°30′02″N 2°46′45″W	Category B	4631	Upload Photo
High Lighthouse, Budden Ness				56°28′08″N 2°45′00″W	Category B	4634	Upload Photo
Woodhill House				56°29′59″N 2°46′44″W	Category B	4653	Upload Photo
Doocot, Ravensby House				56°30′14″N 2°45′27″W	Category B	4651	Upload Photo
Low Lighthouse, Budden Ness				56°28′03″N 2°44′41″W	Category B	4635	Upload Photo
Old Parish Kirk Manse				56°29′51″N 2°45′28″W	Category C(S)	4647	Upload Photo
Barry Buddon, Training Camp, Gunnery Gymnasium				56°28′56″N 2°46′57″W	Category B	50983	Upload Photo
Woodhill Farm				56°30′01″N 2°47′11″W	Category B	4632	Upload Photo
Nether Mill				56°30′02″N 2°45′16″W	Category C(S)	4648	Upload Photo
Barry Mill Including Miller's Cottage				56°30′16″N 2°45′31″W	Category A	4649	Upload another image
Upper Mill Bridge Over Pitairlie Burn				56°30′16″N 2°45′29″W	Category B	4650	Upload Photo
Woodhill House - Sundial				56°29′59″N 2°46′44″W	Category B	4654	Upload Photo
Old Lighthouse, Budden Ness				56°28′07″N 2°44′59″W	Category C(S)	4633	Upload Photo
Trave Bridge Over Pitairlie Burn				56°30′41″N 2°45′57″W	Category C(S)	4652	Upload Photo

== Key ==
The scheme for classifying buildings in Scotland is:

- Category A: "buildings of national or international importance, either architectural or historic; or fine, little-altered examples of some particular period, style or building type."
- Category B: "buildings of regional or more than local importance; or major examples of some particular period, style or building type, which may have been altered."
- Category C: "buildings of local importance; lesser examples of any period, style, or building type, as originally constructed or moderately altered; and simple traditional buildings which group well with other listed buildings."

In March 2016 there were 47,288 listed buildings in Scotland. Of these, 8% were Category A, and 50% were Category B, with the remaining 42% being Category C.

== See also ==
- List of listed buildings in Angus
