= List of listed buildings in Kingoldrum, Angus =

This is a list of listed buildings in the parish of Kingoldrum in Angus, Scotland.

== List ==
Name	Location	Date Listed	Grid Ref. (Note: Sometimes known as OSGB36, the grid reference (where provided) is based on the British national grid reference system used by the Ordnance Survey. • "Guide to National Grid". Ordnance Survey. • "Get-a-map". Ordnance Survey.)	Geo-coordinates	Notes	LB Number (Note: Historic Environment Scotland assign a unique alphanumeric identifier to each designated site in Scotland, for listed buildings this always begins with "LB", for example "LB12345".)	Image
Baldovie - Bridge Over Cromie Burn (Baldovie Farms - South Road)				56°40′20″N 3°06′10″W	Category B	11419	Upload Photo
Nether Ascreavie Farmhouse				56°41′33″N 3°04′50″W	Category B	11423	Upload Photo
Kingoldrum Parish Kirk				56°40′56″N 3°05′18″W	Category C(S)	11412	Upload another image See more images
Parish Kirk Manse (Now <> But Still Known As Manse)				56°40′58″N 3°05′17″W	Category B	13753	Upload another image
Kinclune House				56°41′25″N 3°07′24″W	Category C(S)	13754	Upload another image
Kingoldrum - Church Hall				56°41′00″N 3°05′18″W	Category C(S)	11415	Upload Photo
Baldovie Farmhouse				56°40′25″N 3°06′15″W	Category A	11417	Upload Photo
Barnton Farmhouse				56°41′25″N 3°06′25″W	Category C(S)	11421	Upload Photo
Muir Pearsie Bridge Over Corogle Burn				56°44′00″N 3°02′49″W	Category C(S)	11424	Upload Photo
Pearsie House				56°43′18″N 3°02′15″W	Category B	13755	Upload Photo
Manse Bridge Over Cromie Burn				56°40′59″N 3°05′16″W	Category C(S)	11414	Upload Photo
Baldovie - Doocot				56°40′24″N 3°06′13″W	Category B	11418	Upload Photo
Meikle Kenny Farmhouse				56°40′10″N 3°07′46″W	Category B	11420	Upload Photo
Cairnleith Bridge Over Cromie Burn				56°40′34″N 3°04′50″W	Category C(S)	11422	Upload Photo
Kirkyard - Farquharson Mausoleum				56°40′56″N 3°05′19″W	Category C(S)	11413	Upload another image
Balfour Castle, Incorporating Mains Farm House				56°40′43″N 3°04′58″W	Category B	11416	Upload another image

== Key ==
The scheme for classifying buildings in Scotland is:

- Category A: "buildings of national or international importance, either architectural or historic; or fine, little-altered examples of some particular period, style or building type."
- Category B: "buildings of regional or more than local importance; or major examples of some particular period, style or building type, which may have been altered."
- Category C: "buildings of local importance; lesser examples of any period, style, or building type, as originally constructed or moderately altered; and simple traditional buildings which group well with other listed buildings."

In March 2016 there were 47,288 listed buildings in Scotland. Of these, 8% were Category A, and 50% were Category B, with the remaining 42% being Category C.

== See also ==
- List of listed buildings in Angus
