= List of listed buildings in Lochlee, Angus =

This is a list of listed buildings in the parish of Lochlee in Angus, Scotland.

== List ==
Name	Location	Date Listed	Grid Ref. (Note: Sometimes known as OSGB36, the grid reference (where provided) is based on the British national grid reference system used by the Ordnance Survey. • "Guide to National Grid". Ordnance Survey. • "Get-a-map". Ordnance Survey.)	Geo-coordinates	Notes	LB Number (Note: Historic Environment Scotland assign a unique alphanumeric identifier to each designated site in Scotland, for listed buildings this always begins with "LB", for example "LB12345".)	Image
St. Drostan's Episcopal Church, Tarfside				56°54′23″N 2°50′13″W	Category B	13748	Upload another image See more images
Lochlee Old Parish Church And Churchyard				56°54′24″N 2°50′15″W	Category C(S)	11356	Upload another image See more images
Maule Memorial Church, Tarfside (Former Free Church)				56°54′12″N 2°49′42″W	Category B	11359	Upload another image
Tarfside Bridge Over Water Of Tarf				56°54′22″N 2°50′10″W	Category C(S)	11360	Upload Photo
Invermark Lodge Stables				56°54′51″N 2°55′19″W	Category C(S)	50721	Upload Photo
Maule Monument, Craig Of Migvie Or Hill Of Rowan				56°54′19″N 2°49′59″W	Category B	11353	Upload another image
Cross Stone At Tarfside				56°54′23″N 2°50′55″W	Category B	11355	Upload another image
Dalbrack Bridge				56°53′35″N 2°52′22″W	Category C(S)	11363	Upload Photo
House Of Mark With Former Steading Range, Walled Garden, Bothy And Pig Sty				56°54′48″N 2°54′54″W	Category C(S)	11348	Upload Photo
Invermark Lodge				56°54′47″N 2°55′34″W	Category B	11350	Upload another image
Chapel Near Burn Of Rowan				56°54′31″N 2°51′12″W	Category C(S)	11354	Upload Photo
St. Andrew's Tower Near Auchintoul				56°53′51″N 2°46′44″W	Category B	11361	Upload another image See more images
Corn Mill, Aucheen				56°54′06″N 2°45′29″W	Category B	11362	Upload another image
Kirkton Old House And Shepherd's Bothy With Ancillary Building				56°54′37″N 2°56′04″W	Category C(S)	50723	Upload another image
Invermark Lodge Kennels With East And West Bothies				56°54′38″N 2°56′08″W	Category C(S)	50719	Upload Photo
Lochlee Parish Church And Churchyard (Church Of Scotland)				56°54′42″N 2°54′43″W	Category B	11346	Upload another image
Inchgrundle With Ancillary Buildings				56°53′57″N 2°58′05″W	Category C(S)	11357	Upload Photo
Invermark Lodge Deer Larder				56°54′45″N 2°55′42″W	Category C(S)	11351	Upload another image
Gleneffock Bridge				56°53′53″N 2°53′33″W	Category C(S)	11352	Upload another image See more images
Glen Mark, The Queen's Well				56°56′00″N 2°57′18″W	Category C(S)	11358	Upload another image See more images
Invermark Castle				56°54′41″N 2°55′03″W	Category A	11349	Upload another image

== Key ==
The scheme for classifying buildings in Scotland is:

- Category A: "buildings of national or international importance, either architectural or historic; or fine, little-altered examples of some particular period, style or building type."
- Category B: "buildings of regional or more than local importance; or major examples of some particular period, style or building type, which may have been altered."
- Category C: "buildings of local importance; lesser examples of any period, style, or building type, as originally constructed or moderately altered; and simple traditional buildings which group well with other listed buildings."

In March 2016 there were 47,288 listed buildings in Scotland. Of these, 8% were Category A, and 50% were Category B, with the remaining 42% being Category C.

== See also ==
- List of listed buildings in Angus
