= List of listed buildings in Carmyllie, Angus =

This is a list of listed buildings in the parish of Carmyllie in Angus, Scotland, United Kingdom.

== List ==
Name	Location	Date listed	Grid ref. (Note: Sometimes known as OSGB36, the grid reference (where provided) is based on the British national grid reference system used by the Ordnance Survey. • "Guide to National Grid". Ordnance Survey. • "Get-a-map". Ordnance Survey.)	Geo-coordinates	Notes	LB number (Note: Historic Environment Scotland assign a unique alphanumeric identifier to each designated site in Scotland, for listed buildings this always begins with "LB", for example "LB12345".)	Image
Carmyllie East Parish School				56°35′25″N 2°42′43″W	Category B	4588	Upload another image
Tillyhiot Farm Cottage				56°34′38″N 2°43′28″W	Category C(S)	4589	Upload Photo
Carmyllie Bridge Over Elliot Water				56°34′12″N 2°43′56″W	Category C(S)	4582	Upload another image
Carmyllie Old Parish Schoolhouse (Now "Viewfar")				56°34′38″N 2°44′12″W	Category B	4587	Upload Photo
Cononsyth Farmhouse				56°36′28″N 2°42′29″W	Category B	4590	Upload Photo
Parish Kirk - Hearse House				56°34′24″N 2°44′06″W	Category C(S)	4578	Upload Photo
Parish Kirk - Beadle's House				56°34′24″N 2°44′05″W	Category C(S)	4580	Upload Photo
Carmyllie House, Former Parish Kirk Manse Including Ancillary Buildings, Bee Boles, Garden Walls And Ha-Ha				56°34′23″N 2°44′03″W	Category C(S)	4579	Upload Photo
Guynd House				56°33′58″N 2°42′41″W	Category B	4584	Upload Photo
Cononsyth - Gates				56°36′26″N 2°42′16″W	Category C(S)	4591	Upload Photo
Milton Of Carmyllie - Farm Cottage				56°34′11″N 2°43′58″W	Category C(S)	4581	Upload Photo
Guynd - Gazebo				56°33′53″N 2°42′26″W	Category B	4586	Upload Photo
Carmyllie Parish Kirk Including Graveyard And Boundary Walls				56°34′23″N 2°44′07″W	Category B	4577	Upload another image See more images
Milton Haugh - Farm Cottage				56°34′10″N 2°43′57″W	Category C(S)	4583	Upload another image See more images
Guynd - Dower House				56°33′49″N 2°42′42″W	Category B	4585	Upload Photo

== Key ==
The scheme for classifying buildings in Scotland is:

- Category A: "buildings of national or international importance, either architectural or historic; or fine, little-altered examples of some particular period, style or building type."
- Category B: "buildings of regional or more than local importance; or major examples of some particular period, style or building type, which may have been altered."
- Category C: "buildings of local importance; lesser examples of any period, style, or building type, as originally constructed or moderately altered; and simple traditional buildings which group well with other listed buildings."

In March 2016 there were 47,288 listed buildings in Scotland. Of these, 8% were Category A, and 50% were Category B, with the remaining 42% being Category C.

== See also ==
- List of listed buildings in Angus
