= List of listed buildings in Fern, Angus =

This is a list of listed buildings in the parish of Fern in Angus, Scotland.

== List ==
Name	Location	Date Listed	Grid Ref. (Note: Sometimes known as OSGB36, the grid reference (where provided) is based on the British national grid reference system used by the Ordnance Survey. • "Guide to National Grid". Ordnance Survey. • "Get-a-map". Ordnance Survey.)	Geo-coordinates	Notes	LB Number (Note: Historic Environment Scotland assign a unique alphanumeric identifier to each designated site in Scotland, for listed buildings this always begins with "LB", for example "LB12345".)	Image
Noranside - Stables				56°44′13″N 2°52′02″W	Category B	12330	Upload Photo
Near Wellford Bridge, Fingerpost				56°43′46″N 2°50′50″W	Category C(S)	51612	Upload Photo
Fern Parish Kirk Including Churchyard				56°44′37″N 2°50′41″W	Category C(S)	12327	Upload another image See more images
Noranside - Gardener's Cottage				56°44′30″N 2°51′28″W	Category C(S)	12331	Upload Photo
Noranside House				56°44′22″N 2°51′49″W	Category B	12329	Upload Photo
Vayne Farmhouse				56°43′51″N 2°49′42″W	Category C(S)	12335	Upload another image See more images
Fern Old Manse				56°44′35″N 2°50′40″W	Category C(S)	12328	Upload Photo
Vayne Castle				56°43′42″N 2°49′46″W	Category B	12334	Upload another image See more images
Courtford Bridge Over Noran Water				56°44′13″N 2°52′30″W	Category C(S)	12332	Upload Photo
Deuchar House				56°44′49″N 2°52′23″W	Category B	12333	Upload Photo

== Key ==
The scheme for classifying buildings in Scotland is:

- Category A: "buildings of national or international importance, either architectural or historic; or fine, little-altered examples of some particular period, style or building type."
- Category B: "buildings of regional or more than local importance; or major examples of some particular period, style or building type, which may have been altered."
- Category C: "buildings of local importance; lesser examples of any period, style, or building type, as originally constructed or moderately altered; and simple traditional buildings which group well with other listed buildings."

In March 2016 there were 47,288 listed buildings in Scotland. Of these, 8% were Category A, and 50% were Category B, with the remaining 42% being Category C.

== See also ==
- List of listed buildings in Angus
