= List of listed buildings in Oathlaw, Angus =

This is a list of listed buildings in the parish of Oathlaw in Angus, Scotland.

== List ==
Name	Location	Date listed	Grid ref. (Note: Sometimes known as OSGB36, the grid reference (where provided) is based on the British national grid reference system used by the Ordnance Survey. • "Guide to National Grid". Ordnance Survey. • "Get-a-map". Ordnance Survey.)	Geo-coordinates	Notes	LB number (Note: Historic Environment Scotland assign a unique alphanumeric identifier to each designated site in Scotland, for listed buildings this always begins with "LB", for example "LB12345".)	Image
Finavon Castle - Doocot				56°42′08″N 2°49′59″W	Category B	17724	Upload Photo
Parish Kirkyard Walls				56°35′43″N 2°51′19″W	Category B	17720	Upload another image See more images
Milton of Finavon House				56°42′05″N 2°49′44″W	Category C(S)	17725	Upload another image See more images
Parish Kirk Manse (Not Now In Use As Such)				56°41′42″N 2°51′22″W	Category C(S)	17721	Upload Photo
West Mains Farmhouse				56°41′51″N 2°50′05″W	Category B	17726	Upload Photo
Oathlaw Parish Kirk				56°41′40″N 2°51′26″W	Category B	17719	Upload another image See more images
Old Castle Of Finavon				56°41′50″N 2°49′24″W	Category B	17723	Upload Photo
Tannadyce House - Lodge				56°42′22″N 2°49′54″W	Category B	17727	Upload Photo
Finavon Castle				56°41′50″N 2°49′33″W	Category C(S)	17722	Upload Photo
Tannadyce House - Lodge Gates				56°42′22″N 2°49′54″W	Category B	17728	Upload Photo

== Key ==
The scheme for classifying buildings in Scotland is:

- Category A: "buildings of national or international importance, either architectural or historic; or fine, little-altered examples of some particular period, style or building type."
- Category B: "buildings of regional or more than local importance; or major examples of some particular period, style or building type, which may have been altered."
- Category C: "buildings of local importance; lesser examples of any period, style, or building type, as originally constructed or moderately altered; and simple traditional buildings which group well with other listed buildings."

In March 2016 there were 47,288 listed buildings in Scotland. Of these, 8% were Category A, and 50% were Category B, with the remaining 42% being Category C.

== See also ==
- List of listed buildings in Angus
