= List of listed buildings in Monikie, Angus =

This is a list of listed buildings in the parish of Monikie in Angus, Scotland.

== List ==
Name	Location	Date Listed	Grid Ref. (Note: Sometimes known as OSGB36, the grid reference (where provided) is based on the British national grid reference system used by the Ordnance Survey. • "Guide to National Grid". Ordnance Survey. • "Get-a-map". Ordnance Survey.)	Geo-coordinates	Notes	LB Number (Note: Historic Environment Scotland assign a unique alphanumeric identifier to each designated site in Scotland, for listed buildings this always begins with "LB", for example "LB12345".)	Image
Bridge Over Downie Mill Burn, Arbroath Road				56°30′34″N 2°48′40″W	Category C(S)	17616	Upload Photo
Ardestie Earth House				56°29′58″N 2°48′38″W	Category B	17618	Upload Photo
Hynd Castle				56°33′48″N 2°48′25″W	Category C(S)	17619	Upload Photo
Parish Kirk - Hearse House				56°32′20″N 2°47′08″W	Category C(S)	17605	Upload Photo
Mains Of Ardestie Farmhouse				56°29′49″N 2°48′22″W	Category B	17617	Upload Photo
Parish Kirk Manse				56°32′21″N 2°47′00″W	Category C(S)	17606	Upload Photo
Bridge Over Pitairlie Burn Near Carlungie				56°30′57″N 2°47′22″W	Category C(S)	17613	Upload Photo
Affleck House				56°32′18″N 2°49′26″W	Category B	17610	Upload Photo
Panmure Estates - Panmure Testimonial, Camustane Hill				56°31′45″N 2°47′22″W	Category B	17607	Upload Photo
Pitairlie Bridge Over Pitairlie Burn				56°31′23″N 2°48′42″W	Category B	17612	Upload another image
Carlungie Earth House				56°30′48″N 2°47′45″W	Category B	17614	Upload Photo
Panmure Estates - Camus's Cross Camustane Hill				56°31′51″N 2°46′57″W	Category B	17608	Upload another image
Monikie Parish Kirk				56°32′21″N 2°47′06″W	Category C(S)	17604	Upload another image See more images
Affleck Castle				56°32′19″N 2°49′28″W	Category A	17609	Upload another image
Doccot - Pitairlie Farm				56°31′14″N 2°48′41″W	Category B	17611	Upload Photo
Downie Mill - Doocot				56°30′28″N 2°48′27″W	Category B	17615	Upload Photo

== Key ==
The scheme for classifying buildings in Scotland is:

- Category A: "buildings of national or international importance, either architectural or historic; or fine, little-altered examples of some particular period, style or building type."
- Category B: "buildings of regional or more than local importance; or major examples of some particular period, style or building type, which may have been altered."
- Category C: "buildings of local importance; lesser examples of any period, style, or building type, as originally constructed or moderately altered; and simple traditional buildings which group well with other listed buildings."

In March 2016 there were 47,288 listed buildings in Scotland. Of these, 8% were Category A, and 50% were Category B, with the remaining 42% being Category C.

== See also ==
- List of listed buildings in Angus
