= Corn Exchange, Arbroath =

Commercial building in Arbroath, Angus, Scotland

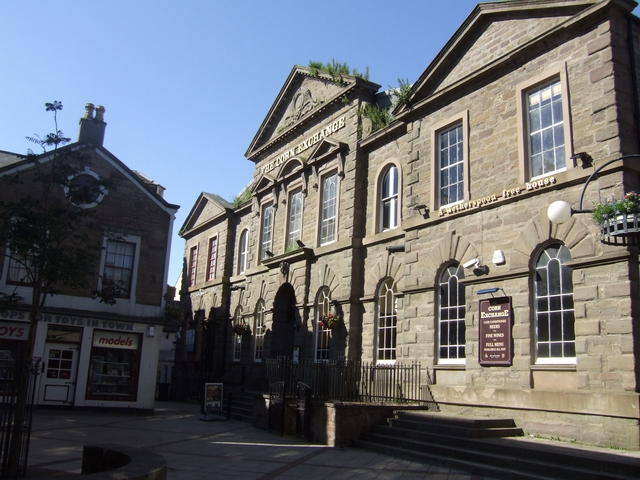
- Corn Exchange, Arbroath

- Shown in Angus
- 56.5585°N 2.5824°W
- Location: Market Place, Arbroath

History
- Built: 1856

Site notes
- Architect: Charles Edward
- Architectural style: Renaissance style

Listed Building – Category B
- Official name: Old Corn Exchange, Market Place
- Designated: 11 October 1971
- Reference no.: LB21182

The Corn Exchange is a commercial building in the Market Place, Arbroath, Angus, Scotland. The structure, which is now used as a public house, is a Category B listed building.

== History ==
In the early 19th century, corn merchants conducted their trade in the open air in front of the Town House. However, as time went on, they were asked to remove their business to the rear of the Town House. The first market hall was a very basic structure consisting of a roof supported by iron pillars. By the mid-19th century, this arrangement was deemed inadequate, and civic leaders decided to commission a dedicated corn exchange on the same site. The new building was designed by Charles Edward of Dundee in the Renaissance style, built in ashlar stone and was completed in 1856.

The design involved a symmetrical main frontage of nine bays facing onto the Market Place. The central section of three bays, which was slightly projected forward, featured a round headed opening with voussoirs and a keystones flanked by round headed windows, also with voussoirs and keystones. The central bay on the first floor was fenestrated by a sash window with an architrave and a segmental pediment, while the bays that flanked it were fenestrated with sash windows with architraves and triangular pediments. The central section was surmounted by a pediment with carvings in the tympanum. The outer sections of three bays each were fenestrated on the ground floor by round headed windows with voussoirs and keystones, while on the first floor, they were fenestrated by small round headed windows in the inner bays, and by sash windows with architraves in the outer bays. Internally, the principal room was the main hall which stretched out behind the main frontage.

The first major function in the building was held on 30 December 1856, when the Lord Lieutenant of Angus, Fox Maule-Ramsay, 11th Earl of Dalhousie, who had served as Secretary of State for War during the Crimean War, was entertained to dinner by the gentlemen of the county.

The building was a commercial failure: the local historian, James McBain, said that it "never yet realised the expectations of the promoters either with respect to its utility or financial success." In any case, the use of the building as a corn exchange declined significantly in the wake of the Great Depression of British Agriculture in the late 19th century.

It was converted for use as a cinema with a large proscenium arch and was re-opened by the provost, William Alexander, as the Olympia Picture Palace on 8 July 1912. It was rebranded as the Olympia Theatre in the 1930s and continued in that use until closure in 1959. It later became a public house, which has been operated by Wetherspoons since January 2001.

== See also ==
- List of listed buildings in Arbroath, Angus
