= List of listed buildings in Arbroath, Angus =

This is a list of listed buildings in the burgh of Arbroath in Angus, Scotland.

== List ==
Name	Location	Date listed	Grid ref. (Note: Sometimes known as OSGB36, the grid reference (where provided) is based on the British national grid reference system used by the Ordnance Survey. • "Guide to National Grid". Ordnance Survey. • "Get-a-map". Ordnance Survey.)	Geo-coordinates	Notes	LB number (Note: Historic Environment Scotland assign a unique alphanumeric identifier to each designated site in Scotland, for listed buildings this always begins with "LB", for example "LB12345".)	Image
Nos. 23, 25 And 27, Marketgate				56°33′26″N 2°34′57″W	Category B	21203	Upload Photo
Nos. 48 And 50, Marketgate				56°33′27″N 2°35′00″W	Category C(S)	21211	Upload Photo
No. 56, Marketgate				56°33′27″N 2°35′00″W	Category C(S)	21213	Upload Photo
No. 64, Marketgate				56°33′28″N 2°35′00″W	Category B	21214	Upload Photo
Nos. 9 And 11, Old Shore Head				56°33′23″N 2°34′51″W	Category C(S)	21217	Upload Photo
Nos. 6-9, The Shore				56°33′23″N 2°35′05″W	Category B	21227	Upload another image
No. 37, Millgate				56°33′29″N 2°35′13″W	Category C(S)	21233	Upload Photo
Nos. 12-18, Keptie Street				56°33′30″N 2°35′20″W	Category B	21234	Upload Photo
St Thomas Of Canterbury Roman Catholic Church, Dishlandtown Street				56°33′22″N 2°35′26″W	Category B	21241	Upload another image
Gladshiel Private Hotel, Ogilvy Place				56°33′52″N 2°35′26″W	Category C(S)	21246	Upload Photo
Hospital Field - Doocot				56°33′21″N 2°36′52″W	Category B	21257	Upload Photo
Arbroath Abbey - Conventual Building				56°33′44″N 2°34′58″W	Category A	21131	Upload Photo
Arbroath Abbey - Regality Tower				56°33′44″N 2°35′02″W	Category A	21133	Upload another image
West Abbey Street, Abbey Parish Church Including Boundary Walls, Gatepiers And Church Halls				56°33′41″N 2°34′54″W	Category B	21136	Upload another image
Nos. 267, 269 And 271 High Street				56°33′42″N 2°35′00″W	Category C(S)	21138	Upload Photo
Inverbrothock Parish Church, James Street				56°33′43″N 2°35′08″W	Category B	21139	Upload another image
No. 3, Ponderlaw Street				56°33′37″N 2°34′46″W	Category C(S)	21149	Upload Photo
Nos. 36 And 38, Hill Street				56°33′31″N 2°34′47″W	Category C(S)	21153	Upload Photo
Nos. 115 And 117, High Street, National Commercial Bank				56°33′32″N 2°34′53″W	Category C(S)	21160	Upload another image
Nos. 147 And 149, High Street				56°33′34″N 2°34′53″W	Category C(S)	21165	Upload Photo
Nos. 80-84 High Street				56°33′31″N 2°34′54″W	Category B	21170	Upload Photo
Nos. 90, 92 And 94, High Street, Guildry Buildings				56°33′32″N 2°34′55″W	Category C(S)	21173	Upload another image
124, High Street				56°33′34″N 2°34′55″W	Category C(S)	21180	Upload Photo
Seaton Smithy				56°34′20″N 2°34′06″W	Category C(S)	47321	Upload Photo
No. 17, Marketgate				56°33′24″N 2°34′56″W	Category B	21201	Upload Photo
No. 7, Old Shore Head				56°33′24″N 2°34′50″W	Category C(S)	21216	Upload Photo
Mortuary Chapel - Western Cemetery				56°33′59″N 2°36′44″W	Category A	21252	Upload another image
Arbroath Abbey - Abbot's House				56°33′43″N 2°34′58″W	Category A	21134	Upload Photo
Abbey Lodge, Abbey Street				56°33′43″N 2°35′01″W	Category B	21137	Upload Photo
Nos. 123 And 125, High Street				56°33′32″N 2°34′53″W	Category C(S)	21162	Upload Photo
Nos. 129 - 133 & 141 High Street, Royal Hotel				56°33′33″N 2°34′53″W	Category B	21163	Upload Photo
Nos. 163 And 165, High Street, Formerly The White Hart Inn				56°33′35″N 2°34′53″W	Category B	21167	Upload Photo
High Street, At Corner Of Commerce Street, Bank Of Scotland				56°33′30″N 2°34′54″W	Category B	21168	Upload another image
No. 10, Marketgate				56°33′23″N 2°34′57″W	Category B	21190	Upload Photo
No. 16, Marketgate				56°33′24″N 2°34′57″W	Category B	21193	Upload Photo
No. 21, Marketgate "The Ship Inn"				56°33′25″N 2°34′57″W	Category C(S)	21202	Upload another image See more images
Ladyloan, Bell Rock Lighthouse Signal Tower And Entrance Lodges				56°33′17″N 2°35′11″W	Category A	21230	Upload another image See more images
Nos. 7 And 9, West Keptie Street				56°33′34″N 2°35′35″W	Category B	21236	Upload another image
3 Albert Street, Mound House				56°33′21″N 2°35′33″W	Category C(S)	21242	Upload another image
"Collingdale" (Formerly Cairniehill Stables)				56°33′56″N 2°35′43″W	Category C(S)	21249	Upload Photo
Kirk Square, K6 Telephone Kiosk				56°33′36″N 2°34′52″W	Category B	21258	Upload another image
Arbroath Abbey - Abbey Church And Precincts				56°33′45″N 2°34′56″W	Category A	21130	Upload another image
Arbroath Abbey - Pend				56°33′44″N 2°35′01″W	Category A	21132	Upload Photo
Dens Road, Baltic Works (Former Arbroath Warehouse Limited Bond Number 1)				56°33′50″N 2°35′18″W	Category A	21141	Upload another image
Wesley House, Ponderlaw Street				56°33′37″N 2°34′43″W	Category C(S)	21148	Upload Photo
100 And 102 High Street				56°33′32″N 2°34′55″W	Category C(S)	21175	Upload Photo
"Ye Lorne Bar", Commerce Street				56°33′30″N 2°34′56″W	Category C(S)	21185	Upload another image
Halls Of Arbroath Old Church, Commerce Street				56°33′29″N 2°34′55″W	Category C(S)	21186	Upload another image
Bank Of Scotland Brothock Bridge				56°33′30″N 2°34′59″W	Category B	21187	Upload Photo
No. 14, Marketgate				56°33′23″N 2°34′57″W	Category B	21192	Upload Photo
Ladybridge House, Ladybridge Street				56°33′24″N 2°34′59″W	Category C(S)	21196	Upload another image
No. 15, Marketgate				56°33′24″N 2°34′56″W	Category B	21200	Upload Photo
64 High Street, Webster Memorial Theatre				56°33′29″N 2°34′53″W	Category C(S)	51409	Upload another image
No. 33, Marketgate				56°33′27″N 2°34′58″W	Category C(S)	21206	Upload Photo
No. 2 And 3, The Shore				56°33′23″N 2°35′03″W	Category B	21225	Upload another image
Ladyloan School Ladyloan				56°33′11″N 2°35′24″W	Category B	21232	Upload another image
Keptie Road, Arbroath High School				56°33′32″N 2°35′42″W	Category B	21239	Upload another image
Water Tower, Keptie Hill				56°33′27″N 2°35′41″W	Category B	21240	Upload another image
Hospital Field				56°33′16″N 2°36′37″W	Category A	21253	Upload another image
Hospital Field - Fernery				56°33′16″N 2°36′34″W	Category B	21254	Upload another image
Hospital Field - North Lodge				56°33′29″N 2°36′48″W	Category B	21255	Upload Photo
St Mary's Rectory, Springfield Terrace				56°33′40″N 2°34′33″W	Category C(S)	21146	Upload Photo
No. 37, West Newgate Street, Newgate House				56°33′30″N 2°34′42″W	Category B	21152	Upload Photo
No. 42, Hill Street				56°33′31″N 2°34′45″W	Category B	21155	Upload Photo
Nos. 99 And 101, High Street				56°33′31″N 2°34′53″W	Category C(S)	21158	Upload Photo
No. 145 High Street				56°33′34″N 2°34′52″W	Category C(S)	21164	Upload Photo
78 High Street And 3 And 5 Commerce Street, Court House				56°33′30″N 2°34′55″W	Category B	21169	Upload another image
114 And 116, High Street				56°33′33″N 2°34′55″W	Category C(S)	21178	Upload Photo
118 And 122 High Street				56°33′34″N 2°34′54″W	Category C(S)	21179	Upload Photo
Arbroath Guide Offices, Market Place				56°33′32″N 2°34′56″W	Category C(S)	21183	Upload another image
No. 8, Marketgate				56°33′23″N 2°34′56″W	Category B	21189	Upload Photo
Nos. 52 And 54, Marketgate				56°33′27″N 2°35′00″W	Category C(S)	21212	Upload Photo
No. 13, Old Shore Head, "The Commercial Inn"				56°33′23″N 2°34′52″W	Category C(S)	21218	Upload another image
No. 7, High Street				56°33′24″N 2°34′47″W	Category C(S)	21222	Upload Photo
No. 1, The Shore				56°33′24″N 2°35′03″W	Category B	21224	Upload another image
No. 13, The Shore				56°33′23″N 2°35′06″W	Category B	21229	Upload another image
4 And 5 Gayfield				56°33′12″N 2°35′30″W	Category B	21245	Upload Photo
Arbroath Abbey - Monument In Burial Ground				56°33′47″N 2°34′56″W	Category B	21135	Upload another image
Maulesbank House, Maule Street				56°33′40″N 2°35′07″W	Category B	21144	Upload Photo
Nos. 105, 107 And 109, High Street				56°33′31″N 2°34′53″W	Category C(S)	21159	Upload Photo
Nos. 151 And 153, High Street				56°33′34″N 2°34′53″W	Category C(S)	21166	Upload Photo
104-108 High Street				56°33′33″N 2°34′55″W	Category C(S)	21176	Upload Photo
No. 20, Marketgate				56°33′24″N 2°34′58″W	Category B	21195	Upload another image
No. 44, Marketgate				56°33′26″N 2°35′00″W	Category B	21209	Upload Photo
Nos. 17 And 19, High Street				56°33′25″N 2°34′48″W	Category C(S)	21223	Upload Photo
No. 4, The Shore, Harbour House				56°33′23″N 2°35′04″W	Category B	21226	Upload another image
"The Croft" No. 31, Keptie Road				56°33′34″N 2°36′01″W	Category C(S)	21238	Upload another image
Infirmary Grounds, House At North-West Corner				56°33′17″N 2°35′54″W	Category C(S)	21243	Upload another image
Millgate, Windmill Hotel				56°33′15″N 2°35′29″W	Category C(S)	21244	Upload another image
Inverbrothock Public School				56°33′55″N 2°35′33″W	Category C(S)	21247	Upload another image
No. 6 Marketgate				56°33′23″N 2°34′56″W	Category B	21188	Upload another image
No. 12, Marketgate				56°33′23″N 2°34′57″W	Category B	21191	Upload Photo
No. 18, Marketgate				56°33′24″N 2°34′58″W	Category B	21194	Upload Photo
No. 11, Marketgate				56°33′24″N 2°34′56″W	Category B	21198	Upload Photo
No. 29, Marketgate				56°33′26″N 2°34′57″W	Category B	21204	Upload Photo
Nos. 39, 41 And 43, Marketgate				56°33′27″N 2°34′58″W	Category C(S)	21207	Upload another image
No. 46, Marketgate				56°33′26″N 2°35′00″W	Category B	21210	Upload Photo
No. 23, Old Shore Head				56°33′23″N 2°34′54″W	Category B	21220	Upload Photo
Nos. 3 And 5, High Street				56°33′23″N 2°34′47″W	Category B	21221	Upload another image
The Elms				56°33′59″N 2°36′01″W	Category A	21250	Upload another image
House In Hays Lane				56°33′51″N 2°34′55″W	Category C(S)	21140	Upload Photo
Gravesend, Burnside Works				56°33′33″N 2°35′03″W	Category B	21143	Upload Photo
St Mary's Episcopal Church, Springfield Terrace				56°33′41″N 2°34′33″W	Category B	21145	Upload another image
Public Library And Art Gallery, Hill Place				56°33′36″N 2°34′46″W	Category B	21150	Upload another image
Old Church Of Arbroath, Kirk Square				56°33′36″N 2°34′51″W	Category B	21151	Upload another image See more images
No. 93, High Street				56°33′31″N 2°34′52″W	Category C(S)	21157	Upload Photo
Nos. 121 And 123, High Street				56°33′32″N 2°34′52″W	Category C(S)	21161	Upload Photo
96 And 98, High Street				56°33′32″N 2°34′55″W	Category C(S)	21174	Upload Photo
110 And 112, High Street				56°33′33″N 2°34′55″W	Category C(S)	21177	Upload Photo
Howard Street Knox's Church Including Boundary Walls And Railings				56°33′47″N 2°35′29″W	Category B	21181	Upload another image
No. 9, Marketgate				56°33′23″N 2°34′55″W	Category B	21197	Upload Photo
No. 31, Marketgate, "Kingsley House"				56°33′26″N 2°34′57″W	Category B	21205	Upload Photo
No. 42, Marketgate				56°33′26″N 2°35′00″W	Category B	21208	Upload Photo
No. 5, Old Shore Head				56°33′24″N 2°34′50″W	Category C(S)	21215	Upload Photo
No. 21, Old Shore Head				56°33′23″N 2°34′54″W	Category B	21219	Upload Photo
Nos. 10 And 11 The Shore				56°33′23″N 2°35′05″W	Category B	21228	Upload Photo
Jock's Lodge, Gowan Street				56°33′29″N 2°35′30″W	Category B	21235	Upload Photo
St Margaret's Church, Keptie Road				56°33′36″N 2°35′38″W	Category B	21237	Upload another image
The Elms - East Lodge				56°33′55″N 2°35′57″W	Category B	21251	Upload Photo
Hospital Field - Farmbuilding				56°33′24″N 2°36′51″W	Category B	21256	Upload Photo
St. John's Methodist Church, 15 Ponderlaw Street				56°33′37″N 2°34′43″W	Category B	21147	Upload another image
No. 40, Hill Street				56°33′31″N 2°34′46″W	Category C(S)	21154	Upload Photo
High Street At Corner Of Hill Street, Clydesdale And North Bank And Prudential Buildings				56°33′31″N 2°34′52″W	Category B	21156	Upload another image
No. 86 High Street				56°33′31″N 2°34′55″W	Category C(S)	21171	Upload Photo
No. 88, High Street Town House				56°33′31″N 2°34′55″W	Category B	21172	Upload another image See more images
Old Corn Exchange, Market Place				56°33′31″N 2°34′57″W	Category B	21182	Upload another image See more images
2 And 8 Market Place				56°33′31″N 2°34′55″W	Category C(S)	21184	Upload Photo
No. 13, Marketgate				56°33′24″N 2°34′56″W	Category B	21199	Upload Photo
Hill Road, Grant's Former Boot/Shoe Factory				56°33′30″N 2°34′34″W	Category B	48019	Upload another image

== Key ==
The scheme for classifying buildings in Scotland is:

- Category A: "buildings of national or international importance, either architectural or historic; or fine, little-altered examples of some particular period, style or building type."
- Category B: "buildings of regional or more than local importance; or major examples of some particular period, style or building type, which may have been altered."
- Category C: "buildings of local importance; lesser examples of any period, style, or building type, as originally constructed or moderately altered; and simple traditional buildings which group well with other listed buildings."

In March 2016 there were 47,288 listed buildings in Scotland. Of these, 8% were Category A, and 50% were Category B, with the remaining 42% being Category C.

== See also ==
- List of listed buildings in Angus
