= Sivewright =

Sivewright is a surname. Notable people with the surname include:

- Edward Sivewright (1806–1873), English cricketer
- James Sivewright (1848–1916), South African businessman and politician
- Jon Sivewright (born 1965), Australian actor

== See also ==
- Sievwright
