= List of listed buildings in Arbroath and St Vigeans, Angus =

This is a list of listed buildings in the parish of Arbroath And St Vigeans in Angus, Scotland.

== List ==
Name	Location	Date listed	Geo-coordinates	Notes	Category	LB number	Image
Woodside House, South Gatelodge Including Boundary Walls And Gatepiers			56°34′23″N 2°37′07″W		C(S)	6473	Upload Photo
Nos. 5-8, Auchmithie			56°35′22″N 2°31′22″W		C(S)	4728	Upload another image
1-6 Fountain Square, Auchmithie			56°35′23″N 2°31′21″W		C(S)	4733	Upload another image See more images
Colliston Castle			56°36′29″N 2°37′58″W		B	4740	Upload another image See more images
Parish Kirk, Manse			56°34′32″N 2°35′25″W		C(S)	4743	Upload Photo
East Kirkton Farmhouse			56°34′25″N 2°35′47″W		B	4745	Upload Photo
Seaton House			56°34′27″N 2°33′28″W		B	4746	Upload Photo
Parkhill Mains Farmhouse			56°36′09″N 2°34′32″W		C(S)	4758	Upload Photo
Windyhills House			56°34′59″N 2°32′03″W		B	4762	Upload Photo
No. 1, Kirkstyle, St. Vigeans	St Vigeans		56°34′37″N 2°35′24″W		B	4774	Upload another image
Nos. 5-8, Kirkstyle, St. Vigeans	St Vigeans		56°34′37″N 2°35′26″W		B	4776	Upload another image
Letham House - West Gates And Lodges			56°34′52″N 2°36′00″W		B	4778	Upload another image
St Vigeans Primary School	St Vigeans		56°34′44″N 2°35′17″W		B	48272	Upload another image
Woodside House Including Sundial To South			56°34′28″N 2°37′05″W		B	6471	Upload Photo
Woodside House, Former Steading And Water Tower			56°34′30″N 2°37′04″W		C(S)	6472	Upload Photo
North Tarry - Garden Walls			56°34′39″N 2°34′55″W		B	4753	Upload Photo
Parkhill House			56°35′55″N 2°34′47″W		B	4756	Upload Photo
Cairnton Farmhouse			56°36′43″N 2°32′22″W		B	4769	Upload Photo
No. 16, Auchmithie			56°35′24″N 2°31′19″W		C(S)	4729	Upload another image
66 Auchmithie ("Musselcrag" Craft Shop)			56°35′22″N 2°31′21″W		B	4732	Upload another image
Letham Grange - Doocot			56°36′07″N 2°36′51″W		B	4735	Upload Photo
North Tarry House			56°34′37″N 2°34′56″W		B	4751	Upload Photo
"Lyona", Marywell			56°35′09″N 2°34′16″W		C(S)	4764	Upload Photo
Newton House			56°36′24″N 2°33′32″W		B	4767	Upload Photo
Woodville House, Lodge And Gatepiers			56°34′51″N 2°37′50″W		B	4722	Upload Photo
Auchmithie Kirk			56°35′19″N 2°31′31″W		B	4725	Upload another image
Nos. 1-3, Auchmithie			56°35′21″N 2°31′24″W		C(S)	4727	Upload another image See more images
Rosely Hotel			56°34′22″N 2°37′15″W		B	4742	Upload Photo
Letham Grange - East Lodge Gates			56°36′04″N 2°35′59″W		C(S)	4760	Upload Photo
Marywell - North-East Side			56°35′15″N 2°34′13″W		C(S)	4765	Upload Photo
Newton House - West Lodge			56°36′14″N 2°33′35″W		B	4766	Upload Photo
St Vigeans Bridge Over Brothock Burn	St Vigeans		56°34′36″N 2°35′22″W		B	4773	Upload another image See more images
Nos. 2-4, Kirkstyle, St. Vigeans	St Vigeans		56°34′37″N 2°35′25″W		B	4775	Upload another image See more images
Letham Mill Bridge Over Brothock Burn			56°35′01″N 2°35′50″W		C(S)	108	Upload another image
Former Stables And Coach House, Seaton House			56°34′29″N 2°33′29″W		B	5108	Upload Photo
Abbeythune - Cottage			56°37′14″N 2°32′23″W		C(S)	4724	Upload Photo
Auchmithie School			56°35′16″N 2°31′35″W		C(S)	4726	Upload Photo
Letham Grange House			56°36′06″N 2°36′47″W		B	4734	Upload another image See more images
West Seaton House (West Seaton Farmhouse)			56°33′55″N 2°33′27″W		B	4749	Upload another image
Seaton House Tower			56°34′27″N 2°33′30″W		B	4752	Upload Photo
Letham Grange East Lodge			56°36′04″N 2°35′59″W		C(S)	4759	Upload Photo
Windyhills - Walled Garden			56°34′59″N 2°32′02″W		B	4763	Upload Photo
Letham House			56°34′52″N 2°35′58″W		B	4777	Upload another image
Letham House - Walled Garden			56°34′50″N 2°36′00″W		B	4779	Upload another image
38 Auchmithie			56°35′23″N 2°31′16″W		C(S)	4730	Upload Photo
Captain's House, (Formerly Woodlands), Royal Naval Air Station			56°35′03″N 2°37′48″W		B	4739	Upload Photo
Seaton House - West Lodge			56°34′27″N 2°34′00″W		B	4747	Upload Photo
East Seaton Farmhouse			56°34′15″N 2°33′07″W		C(S)	4748	Upload Photo
Tarry Mill - Out Building			56°34′49″N 2°35′02″W		B	4754	Upload Photo
Kirkyard Walls	St Vigeans		56°34′37″N 2°35′25″W		B	4771	Upload another image
50 Auchmithie			56°35′23″N 2°31′17″W		C(S)	4731	Upload Photo
Letham Grange - North Entrance Gateway			56°36′13″N 2°37′19″W		C(S)	4736	Upload Photo
North Tarry - South Gates			56°34′32″N 2°35′00″W		C(S)	4750	Upload another image
Letham Mill Farmhouse			56°35′01″N 2°35′45″W		C(S)	4755	Upload Photo
Parkhill - Sundial			56°35′55″N 2°34′48″W		C(S)	4757	Upload Photo
Seaton House - Cottage			56°34′12″N 2°33′15″W		C(S)	4761	Upload Photo
Bell Rock Lighthouse			56°25′58″N 2°23′17″W		A	45197	Upload Photo
Abbeythune House			56°37′08″N 2°32′24″W		B	4723	Upload Photo
East Mains Of Colliston Farmhouse			56°36′12″N 2°37′37″W		B	4737	Upload Photo
Colliston Mill Smithy			56°36′08″N 2°39′00″W		C(S)	4738	Upload Photo
Earth-House, Cairn Conan			56°35′44″N 2°41′48″W		B	4741	Upload Photo
Elm Bank			56°34′32″N 2°35′36″W		B	4744	Upload Photo
Old Wheelwright's Workshop, Drunkendub			56°36′31″N 2°32′58″W		C(S)	4768	Upload Photo
St. Vigeans Parish Kirk	St Vigeans		56°34′36″N 2°35′25″W		A	4770	Upload another image See more images
Hearse House			56°34′32″N 2°35′24″W		B	4772	Upload Photo
Angus, Arbroath, Rm Condor, Control Tower			56°34′58″N 2°37′19″W		C(S)	50470	Upload Photo

== Key ==
The scheme for classifying buildings in Scotland is:

- Category A: "buildings of national or international importance, either architectural or historic; or fine, little-altered examples of some particular period, style or building type."
- Category B: "buildings of regional or more than local importance; or major examples of some particular period, style or building type, which may have been altered."
- Category C: "buildings of local importance; lesser examples of any period, style, or building type, as originally constructed or moderately altered; and simple traditional buildings which group well with other listed buildings."

In March 2016 there were 47,288 listed buildings in Scotland. Of these, 8% were Category A, and 50% were Category B, with the remaining 42% being Category C.

== See also ==
- List of listed buildings in Arbroath, Angus - for listed buildings within the boundaries of Arbroath.
- List of listed buildings in Angus
