= St Andrew's Parish Church, Arbroath =

St Andrew's Church
- St Andrew's Parish Church, Arbroath
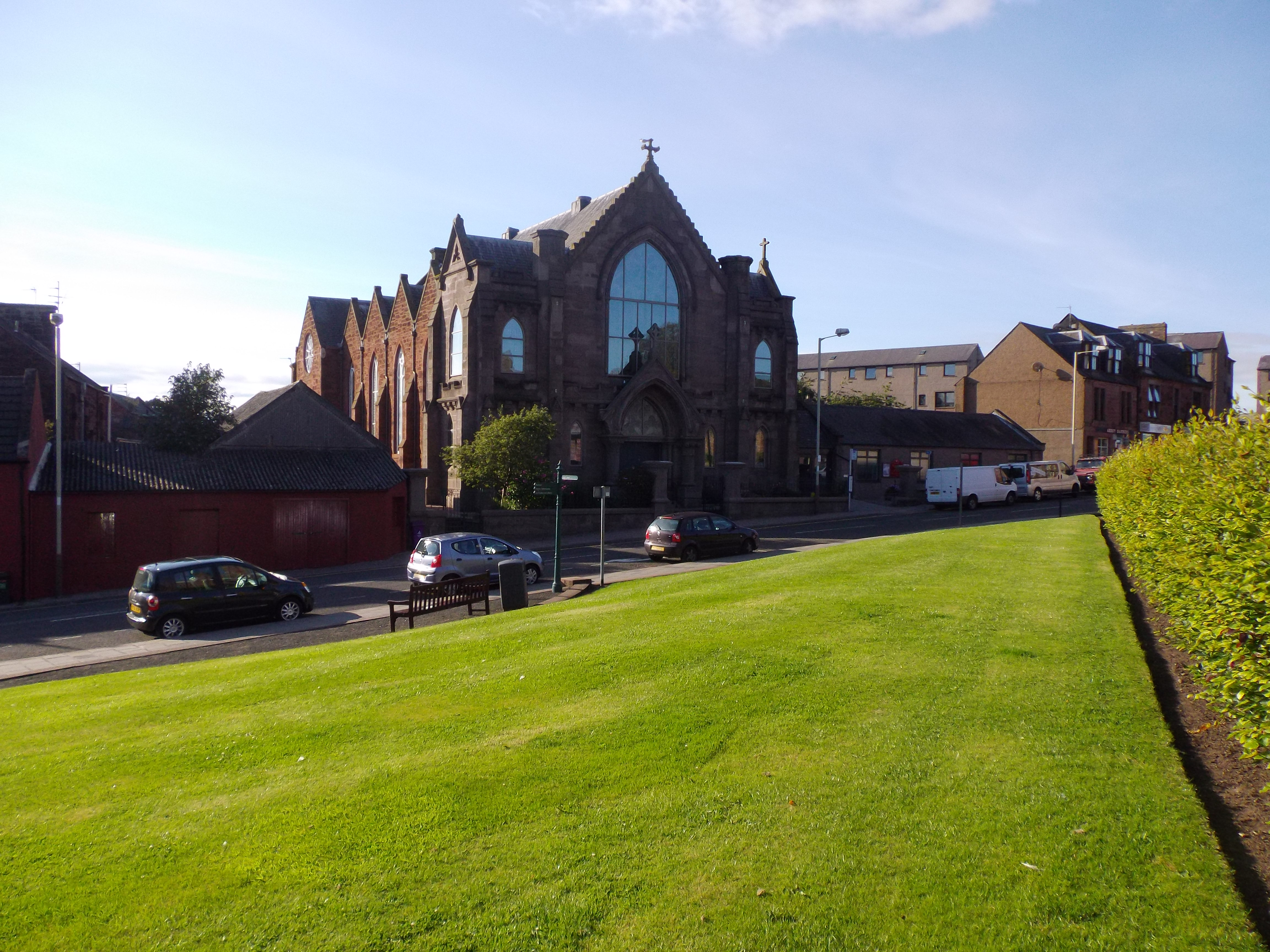
- St Andrew's Church
- 56.562788°N 2.584186°W
- Location: Arbroath, Angus
- Country: Scotland
- Denomination: Church of Scotland
- Website: www.arbroathstandrews.org.uk

History
- Status: Parish church
- Dedication: Saint Andrew

Architecture
- Functional status: Active

St Andrew's Parish Church is a congregation of the Church of Scotland located in Arbroath, Angus, Scotland.

The church building was constructed in the late 1880s. In 2007 the church underwent extensive refurbishment, funded by donations from the congregation and a grant from the Church of Scotland. The final minister of the congregation (before it united) was the former Moderator of the General Assembly of the Church of Scotland, Right Rev. Martin Fair.

The church houses the 7th Arbroath Boys' Brigade and other youth groups.

It is now part of the larger Arbroath and District Church, an amalgamation of nine churches in Arbroath and the surrounding area. It is now a team ministry, with Christine Hay, Peter Philips and Judith MacLeod filling the three allocated ministry posts. The St Andrew's Church is still in use each Sunday for worship.

== See also ==
- Church of St Mary the Virgin, Arbroath (Episcopal)
- St John's Methodist Church, Arbroath
