= Signal Tower Museum =

Museum in Angus, Scotland

Coordinates: 56°33′16″N 2°35′11″W

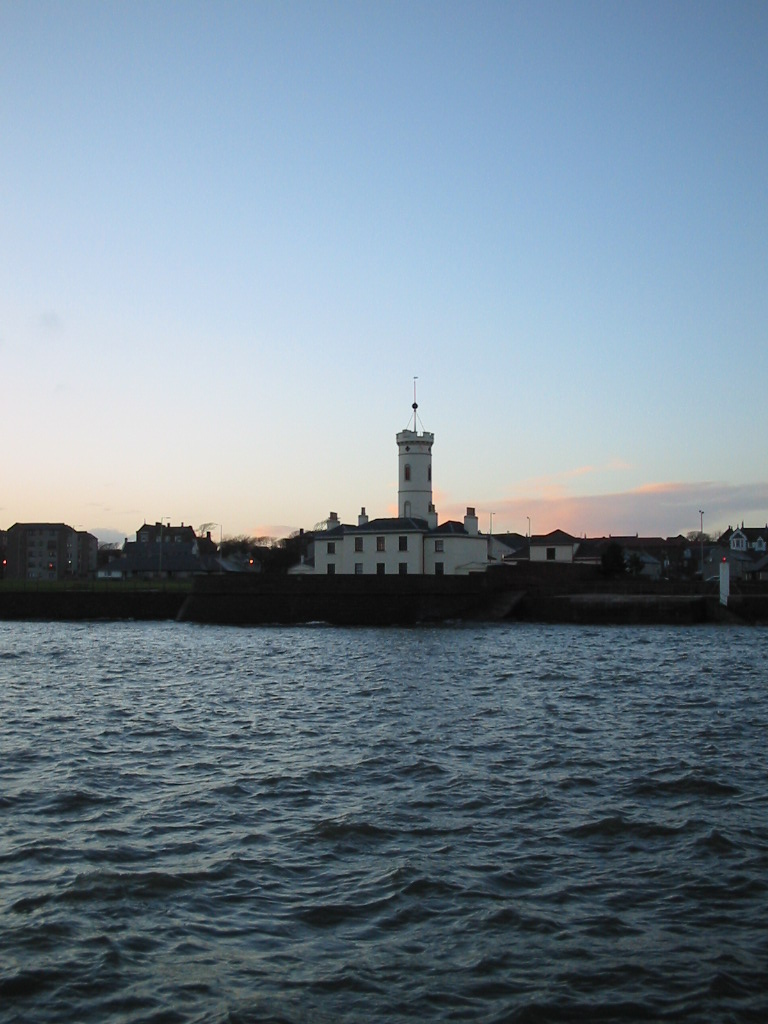
- Established: Built 1813; Council Housing 1955-1974; Museum 1974-present
- Location: Arbroath Signal Tower Museum, Ladyloan, Arbroath, DD11 1PU
- Director: Angus Alive

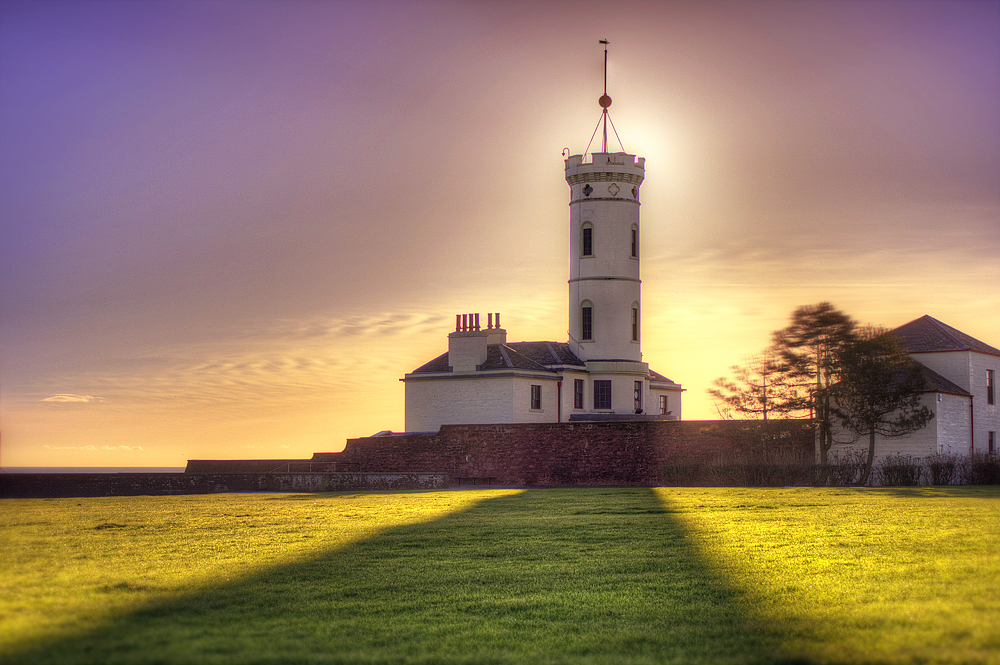
Signal Tower Museum at sunset. Photograph by David McIntosh

The Signal Tower is a museum in the coastal town of Arbroath, Angus, Scotland.

== Working life ==
Originally built in 1813 as a base of operations for the famous Bell Rock Lighthouse, the Signal Tower housed the families of the keepers stationed on the 'rock', along with the vital shore staff who ran the lighthouse tender supplying the light. The name Signal Tower comes from the signalling apparatus installed atop of the tower building that was used to communicate between the shore staff (the Master Of The Tender) and the keepers of the lighthouse. An identical set of signalling apparatus is installed atop the lighthouse itself. Installed within the Signal Tower was a small observatory outfitted with a powerful telescope; it was through this telescope that the signalling apparatus on the lighthouse was monitored during the day. In an age before wireless communications, the ball system employed by the Bell Rock was seen as state of the art technology. At night, any fluctuation to the light would see the supply vessel set sail for the 'rock' to investigate.

The signalling apparatus worked with a ball hoisted up and down a pole. The Master of the Tender or one of his staff was responsible for keeping watch between 9 am and 10 am, during which period the lighthouse keepers would hoist the ball up to the top of the pole if all was well. During foggy weather, the watch was postponed to 1 pm. If the ball did remain down, it usually signified a major emergency such as a chronic shortage of provisions or illness of one of the lighthouse keepers, in any case, the tender was launched and would sail for the lighthouse as soon as possible. In 1955, with the advent of helicopters and faster boats, staffing for the lighthouse was carried out from Leith, home of the Northern Lighthouse Board.

Fishing vessels from Arbroath would routinely carry newspapers, fresh rolls and other non-essential provisions to the keepers and would relay messages back to the shore station, either on behalf of the Master of the Tender or as a favour to the lighthouse keepers.

== Council housing ==
After the NLB handed the building to the then Arbroath Town Council, it was used for around 15 years as council housing before being converted in the 1970s into a museum.

== Museum ==
View of the Bell Rock Signal Tower shore station in Arbroath, looking out to sea.

After its brief and bizarre spell as council housing, the building was converted into a museum, focusing on Arbroath and the surrounding area. Arbroath, like Dundee was a major jute processor and was home to many world-renowned companies, including Shanks Lawnmowers, Giddings + Lewis-Fraser and Keith & Blackman. The museum holds many items and documents relating to the lawnmower manufacturer Shanks, including a number of lawnmowers produced by the company, as well as a variety of documents, photographs and company insignia from Giddings + Lewis-Fraser and Keith & Blackman.

In addition to the manufacturing exhibits, the Signal Tower Museum also has many exhibits relating to the Bell Rock Lighthouse, a scale model of the Inchcape Rock and the lighthouse upon it, and one of the light mechanisms previously fitted to the lighthouse. There is a wide range of exhibits relating to the fishing industry, with scale models of many fishing vessel types once found in the harbour at Arbroath, along with information on fishing and the fish processing industry in Arbroath.

In addition to the historical exhibits relating to Arbroath, there is also useful information for ramblers with information on the numerous nature trails around Arbroath.

== References and further reading ==
- BellRock.org.uk
- Angus Alive Signal Tower Museum Website
- Signal Tower Museum on Tripadvisor
- Arbroath Timeline
