= Colliston =

Coordinates: 56.596°N 2.645°W

- Location within Angus
- OS grid reference: NO605450
- Council area: Angus
- Lieutenancy area: Angus
- Country: Scotland
- Sovereign state: United Kingdom
- Post town: ARBROATH
- Postcode district: DD11
- Dialling code: 01241
- Police: Scotland
- Fire: Scottish
- Ambulance: Scottish
- UK Parliament: Angus
- Scottish Parliament: Angus

Colliston is a roadside hamlet in Angus, Scotland that is four miles north of Arbroath on the A933 Arbroath to Brechin road, in the parish of St Vigeans.

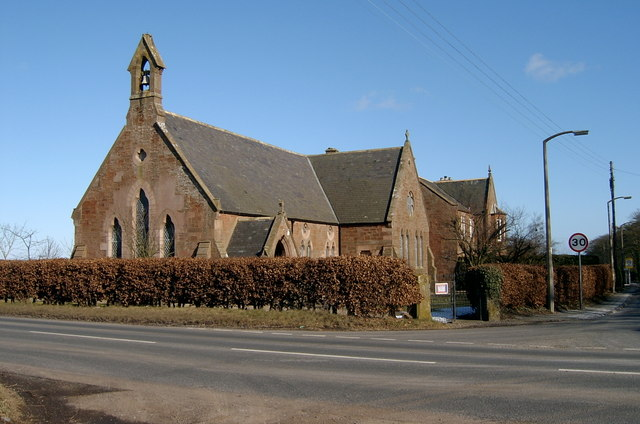
Parish church at Colliston

== See also ==
- Arbroath

== Sources ==
- Colliston in the Gazetteer for Scotland.
