= Sievwright =

The following people have the surname Sievwright, or Sievewright:

- Charles Sievwright (1800–1855 ) British army officer and Assistant Protector of Aborigines in New South Wales.
- George Sievwright (born 1937), Scottish footballer
- James Sievewright (1783–1852) minister and Free Church moderator
- John Sievewright (born 1846), Canadian politician and teacher
- Margaret Sievwright (1844–1905), New Zealand political activist
- Nikki Sievwright (1943–2018), model
- Robert Sievwright (1882–1947), Scottish cricketer
