= St John's Methodist Church, Arbroath =

Church in Scotland

St John's Methodist Church
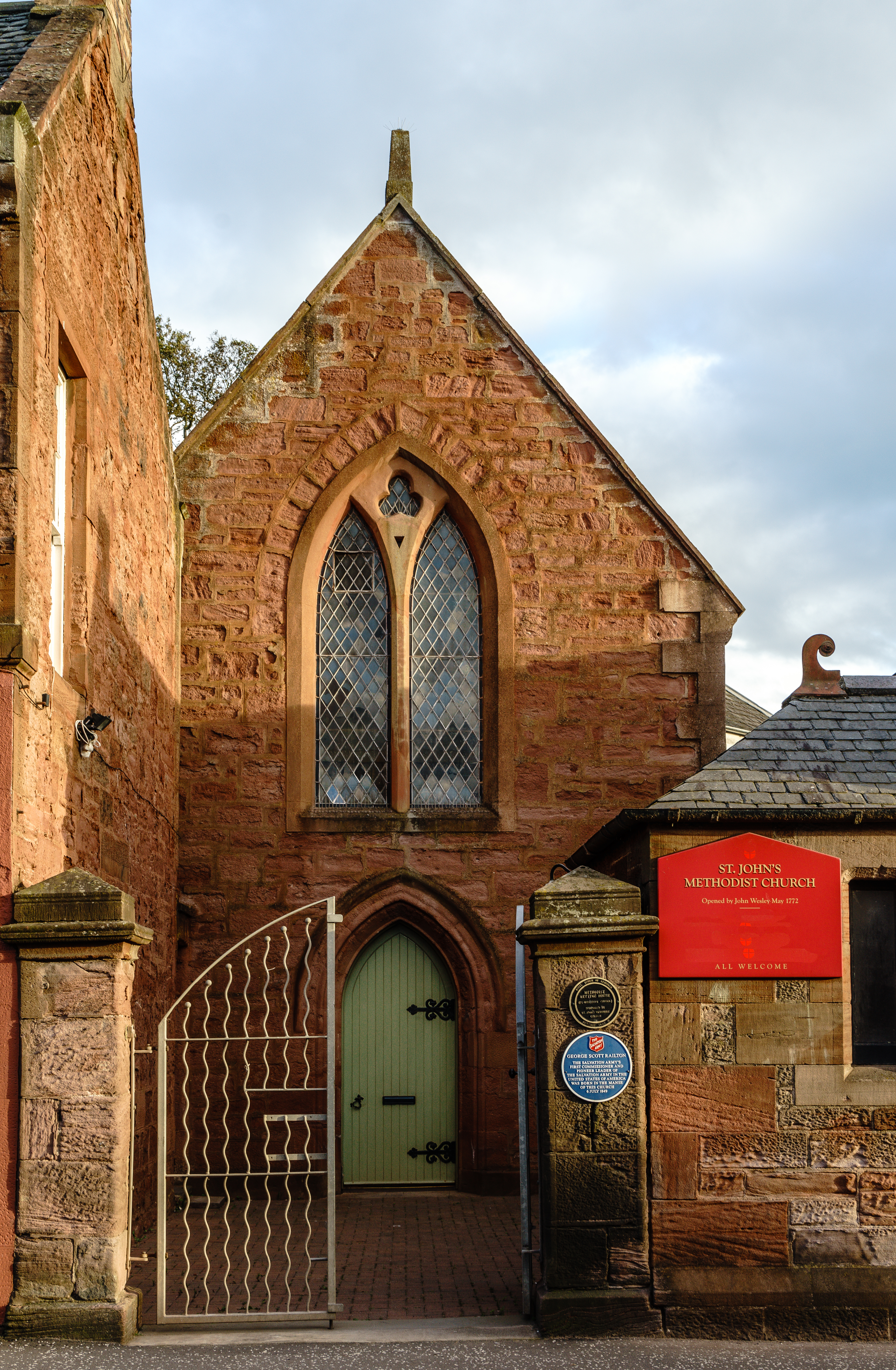

- Location of St John's Methodist Church in Angus
- 56°33′36.8″N 2°34′43″W
- OS grid reference: NO645410
- Location: Arbroath
- Country: Scotland
- Denomination: Methodist

History
- Founded: 6 May 1772
- Founder: John Wesley

Architecture
- Heritage designation: Category B
- Designated: 11 October 1971

St John's Methodist Church, on Ponderlaw Street, Arbroath, Scotland, was founded by John Wesley on 6 May 1772. The nave is octagonal and the church has been nicknamed Totum Kirkie from 'totum', an eight-sided spinning top, and 'kirk', the Scottish word for church. It is a listed building and the second-oldest Methodist church in Scotland.

== Architecture ==
St John's is an octagonal church — a style that was preferred by John Wesley. The interior of the church has not been altered; however, the church was extended in 1882 when a porch and gallery were added. A church hall was built in 1896. The Lifeboat Window is a memorial to the loss of the RNLI lifeboat Robert Lindsay (ON 874) and six crew members in 1953.

The building became a Category B listed building on 11 October 1971.

== Manse ==
The Church's former manse, now Wesley House, located next door, is also a listed building. It was built as a single-storey building in 1772; an upper storey was added in 1869.

George Scott Railton (1849 – 1913), the first Commissioner of The Salvation Army and second in command to its founder William Booth, was born in the manse. He was the son of Methodist missionaries, Lancelot Railton and his wife, Margaret Scott. A blue plaque marks his birthplace.

== Archives ==
Archives relating to the church are held by Archive Services University of Dundee as part of the Arbroath and Montrose Methodist Circuit Collection.

== See also ==
- St Andrew's Parish Church, Arbroath (Church of Scotland)
- Church of St Mary the Virgin, Arbroath (Episcopal)
