= Arbroath =

Scottish town in Angus

Arbroath: Scottish Gaelic: Obar Bhrothaig; Scots: Aiberbrothock
- Town
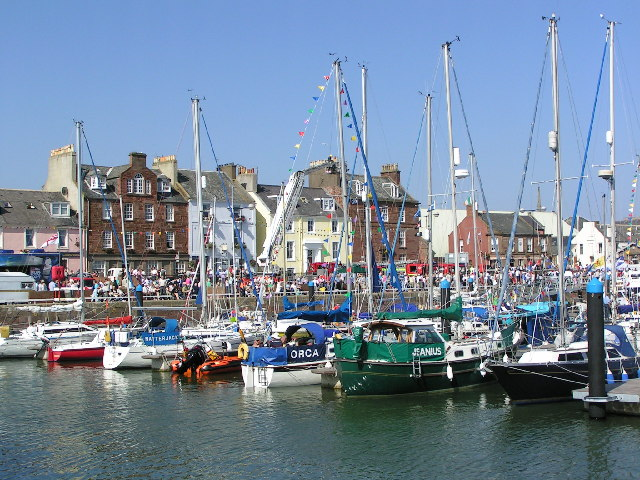
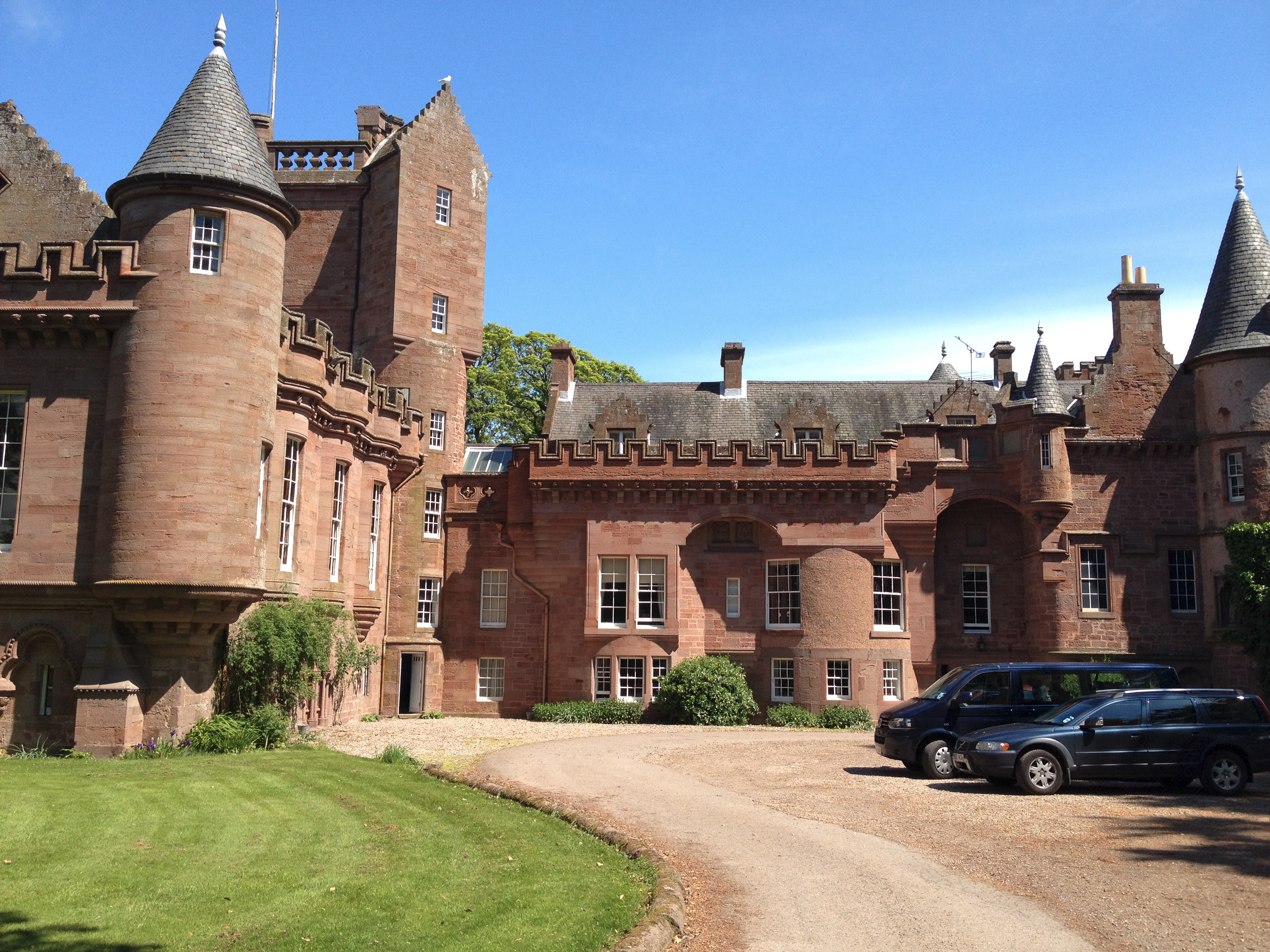
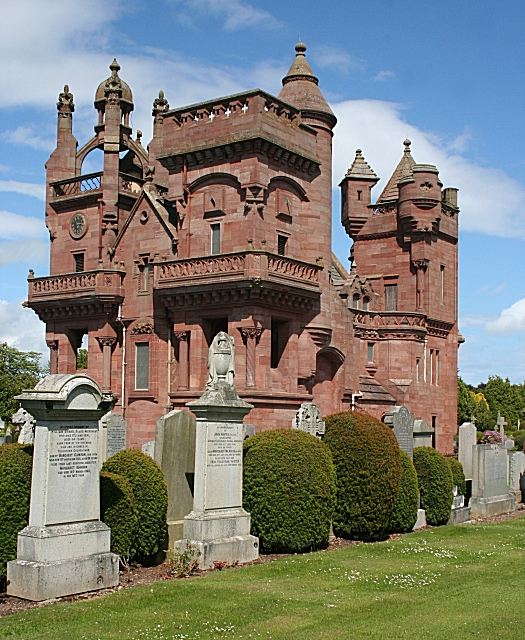
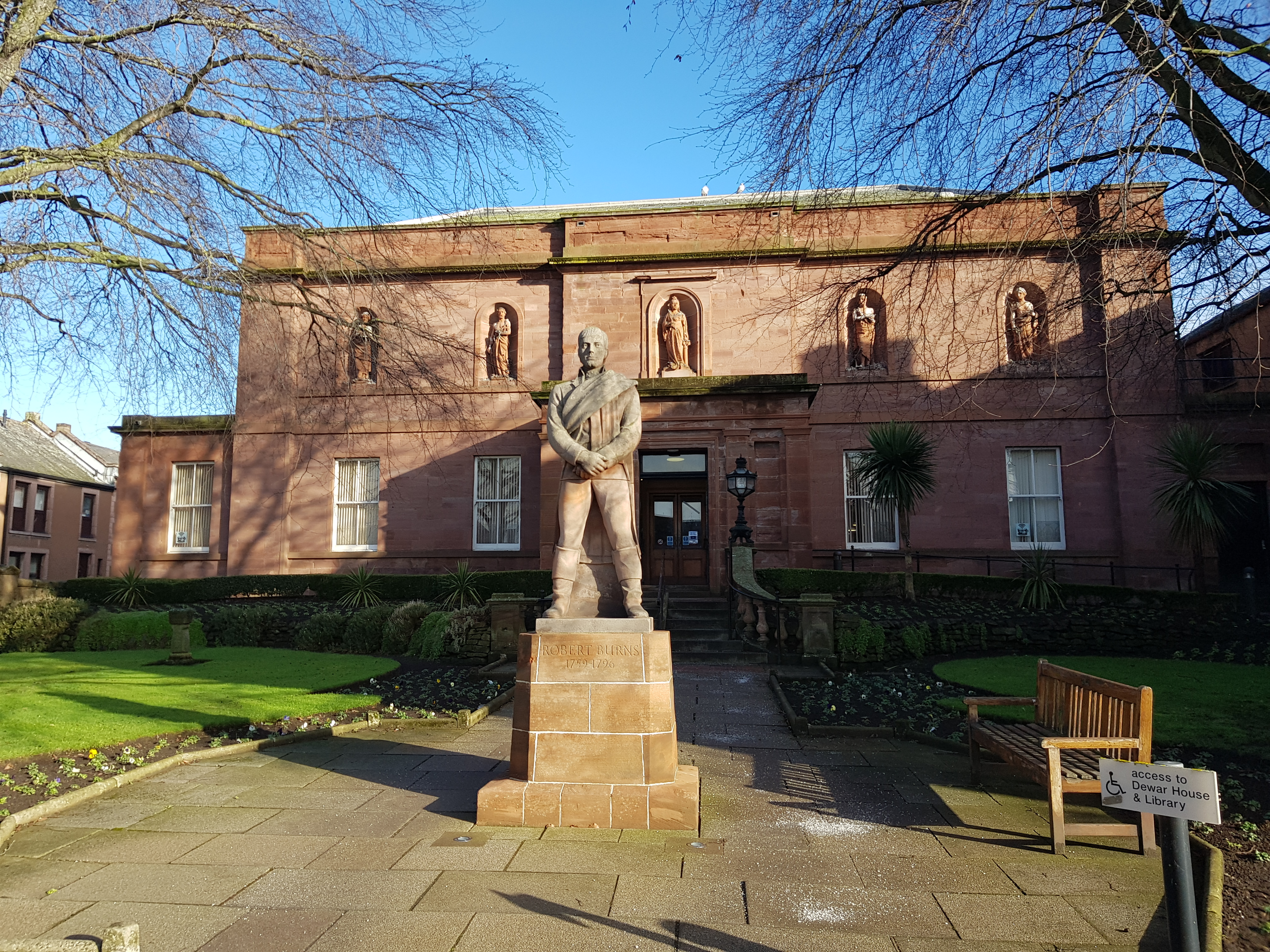
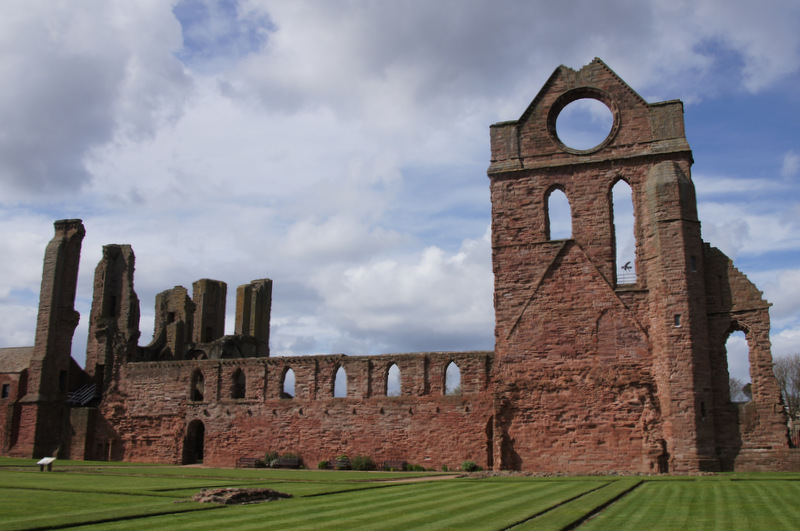
- Arbroath Harbour Hospitalfield House Mortuary Chapel The Library Arbroath Abbey

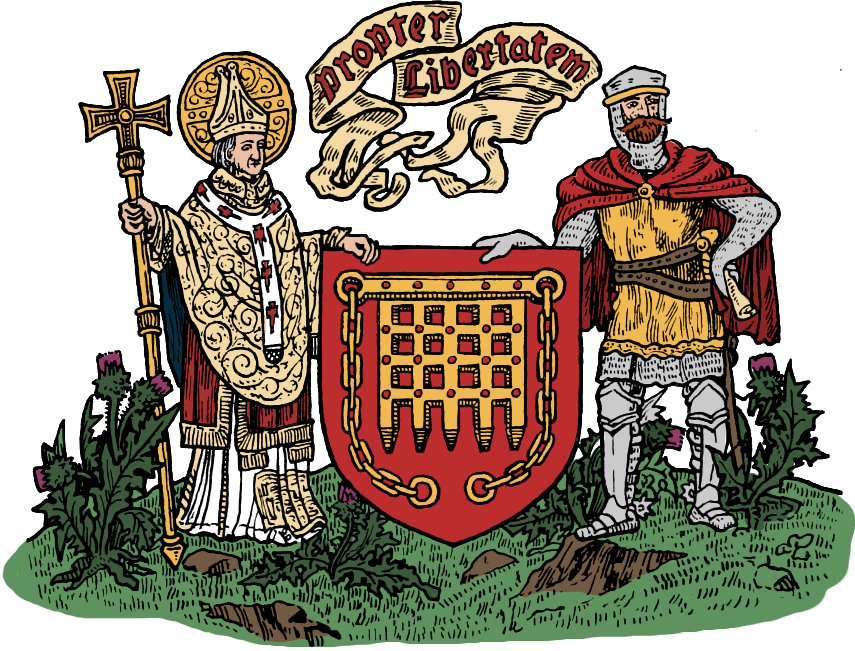
- Coat of Arms

- Location within Angus
- Population: 23,481 (2022)
- OS grid reference: NO641412
  - Edinburgh: 45 mi (72 km) SSW
  - London: 371 mi (597 km) SSE
- Council area: Angus
- Lieutenancy area: Angus
- Country: Scotland
- Sovereign state: United Kingdom
- Post town: ARBROATH
- Postcode district: DD11
- Dialling code: 01241
- Police: Scotland
- Fire: Scottish
- Ambulance: Scottish
- UK Parliament: Arbroath and Broughty Ferry
- Scottish Parliament: Angus South

Arbroath (/ɑːrˈbroʊθ/) or Aberbrothock (Scottish Gaelic: Obar Bhrothaig [ˈopəɾ ˈvɾo.ɪkʲ]) is a historic coastal town and former royal burgh in Angus, Scotland. It is the largest town in the council area, with a population of 23,481 in 2022. It lies on the North Sea coast, some 16 miles (26 km) east-northeast of Dundee and 45 miles (72 km) south-southwest of Aberdeen.

There is evidence of Iron Age settlement, but its history as a town began with the founding of Arbroath Abbey in 1178. It grew much during the Industrial Revolution through the flax and then the jute industry and the engineering sector. A new harbour was created in 1839; by the 20th century, Arbroath was one of Scotland's larger fishing ports.

The town is notable for the Declaration of Arbroath and the Arbroath smokie. Arbroath Football Club holds the world record for the number of goals scored in a professional football match: 36–0 against Bon Accord of Aberdeen in the Scottish Cup in 1885.

== History ==
=== Toponymy ===
The earliest recorded name was 'Aberbrothock', referring to the Brothock Burn that runs through the town. The prefix Aber derived either from the Gaelic 'Obair', or the earlier Brythonic term Aber for confluence or river mouth. The name Aberbrothock was spelt numerous ways. The earliest manuscripts available have it as "Abirbrothoke" (in a letter to Edward I confirming the Treaty of Salisbury, which agreed that the Queen regnant, Margaret, Maid of Norway would marry Edward I) and "Aberbrothok" (in a subsequent letter of consent to the marriage). In the Declaration of Arbroath, it is seen as "Abirbrothoc". Early maps show a number of variants including Aberbrothock, Aberbrothik, Aberbrothick, and Aberbrothwick.

The modern name Arbroath came into common use from the mid-19th century, the older name being largely dropped by the time of the first Ordnance Survey edition. However, variants of 'Arbroath' had been used since the 17th century, including 'Arbroth' and Aberbreth.

=== Early history ===
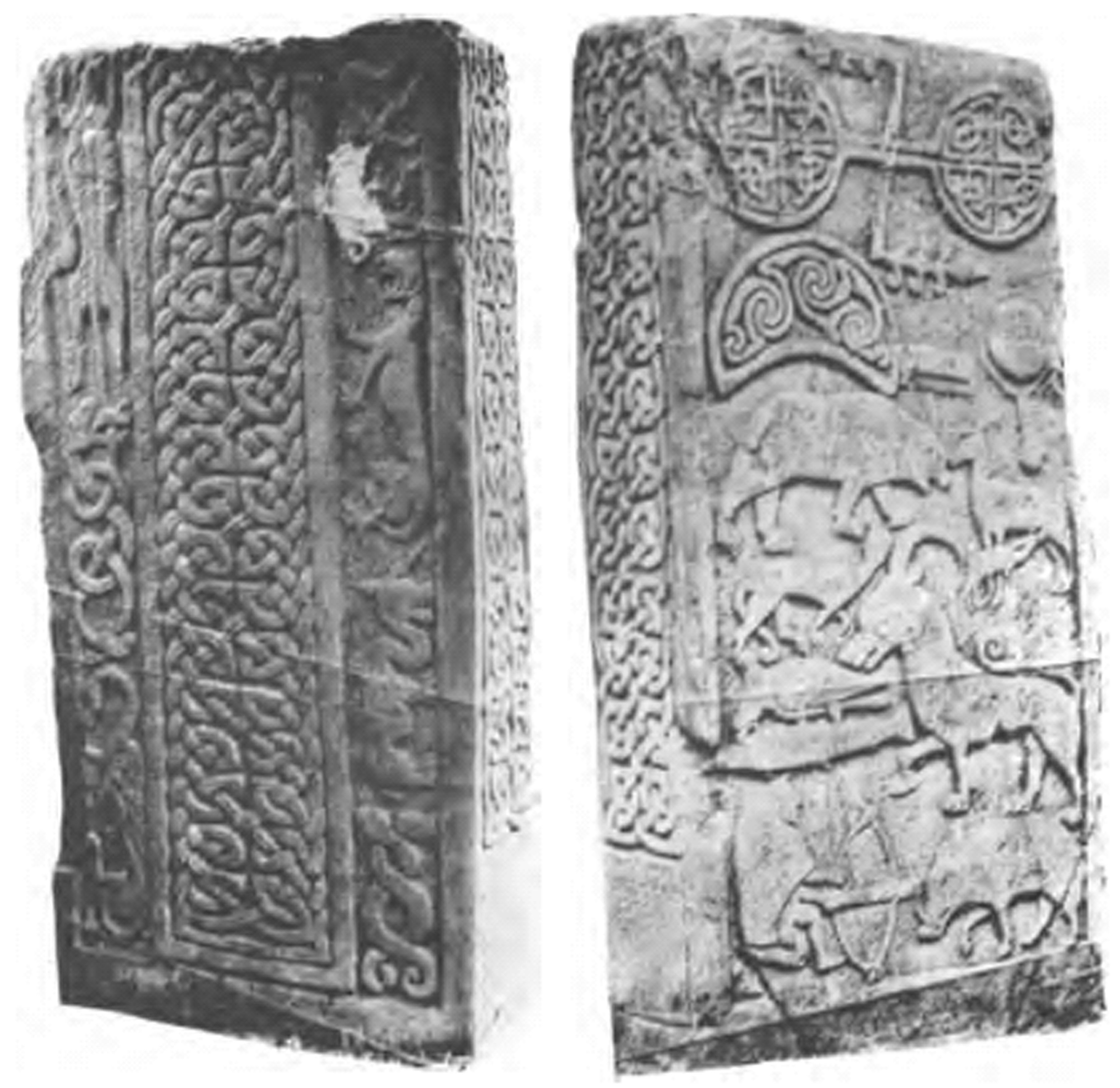
Drosten Stone

The area of Arbroath has been inhabited since at least the Neolithic period. Material from postholes at an enclosure at Douglasmuir, near Friockheim, some five miles north of Arbroath, have been radiocarbon dated to about 3500 BCE. The function of the enclosure is unknown – perhaps for agriculture or for ceremonial purposes.

Bronze Age finds are abundant in the area. They include short-cist burials near West Newbigging, about a mile north of the town, which yielded pottery urns, a pair of silver discs and a gold armlet. Iron Age archaeology is also present, for example in the souterrain near Warddykes Cemetery and at West Grange of Conan, as well as better-known examples at Carlungie and Ardestie.

The area appears to have had importance in the early Christian period, as shown by Pictish stone carvings found during restoration of St Vigeans Church, now housed in the small museum there. The stones had been used in building the old church and many were badly damaged. One of them, the 9th century Drosten Stone, is among the few Pictish artefacts with a Latin inscription: DROSTEN: IREUORET [E]TTFOR CUS'. This has been variously construed, but is thought to refer to the Pictish King Uurad, who reigned in 839–842 CE.

=== Medieval history ===
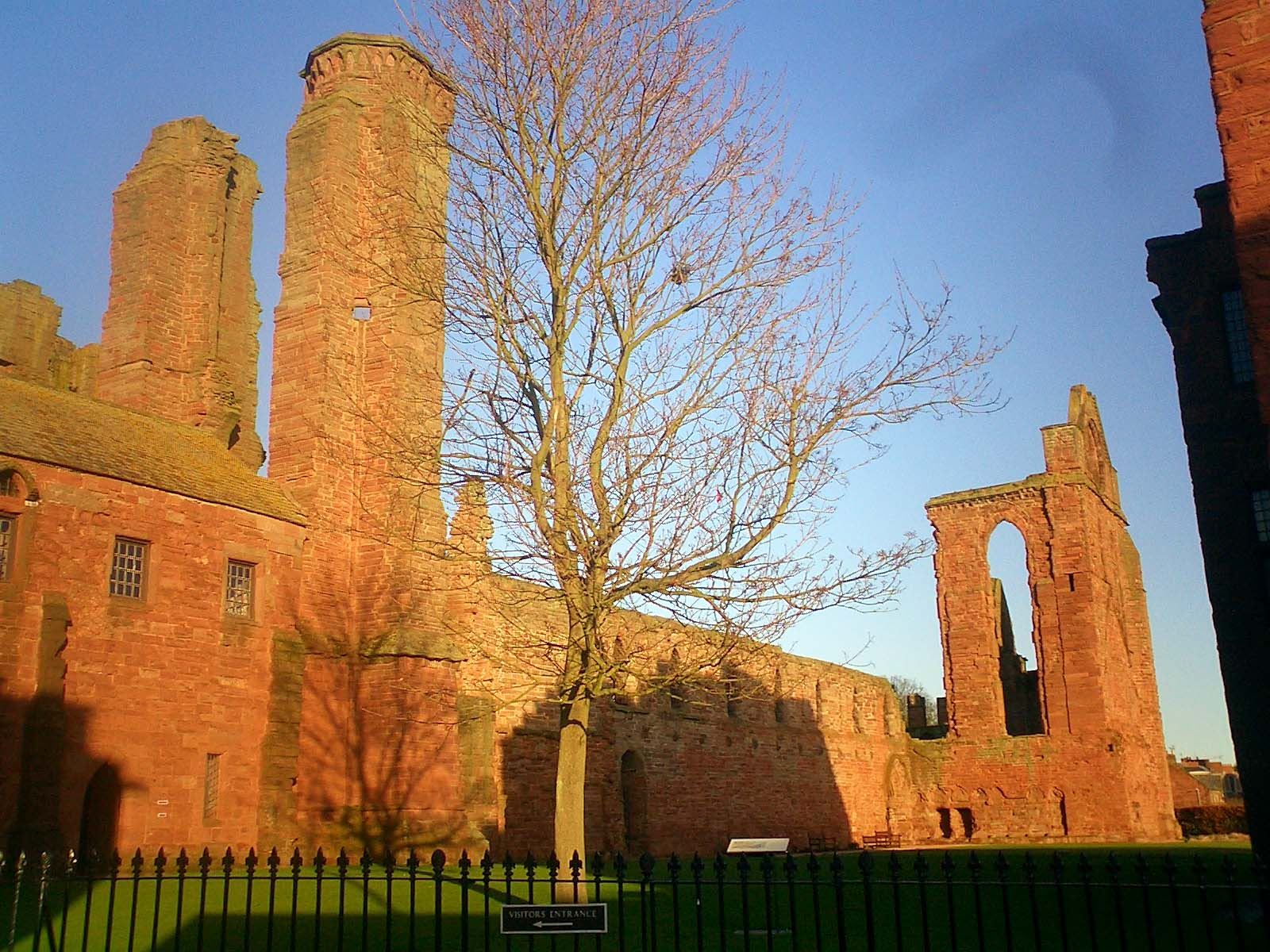
Ruined Arbroath Abbey, built from local red sandstone

The recorded history of Arbroath begins with the foundation of the Abbey by King William the Lion in 1178 for monks of the Tironensian order from Kelso Abbey. It was consecrated in 1197 with a dedication to Saint Thomas Becket, as the King's only personal foundation; he was buried within its precincts in 1214. The Abbey was not finally completed until 1233.

King John, also in the 13th century, exempted Arbroath from "toll and custom" in every part of England except London.

On 6 April 1320 the Scottish Parliament met at Arbroath Abbey and addressed to the Pope the Declaration of Arbroath, drafted by the Abbot of the time, Bernard. This detailed the services which their "lord and sovereign" Robert the Bruce had rendered to Scotland and eloquently affirmed Scots independence.

The Battle of Arbroath in 1446 came after a series of clashes between the Chief Justiciary of Arbroath, Alexander Lindsay, third Earl of Crawford and Bishop James Kennedy of St Andrews, which resulted in Lindsay sacking the bishop's lands and burning his properties. Lindsay was excommunicated and it was felt this conflicted with his role as Chief Justiciary. The monks of Arbroath Abbey selected Alexander Ogilvy of Inverquharity as his replacement and the insult led to pitched battle in the town, leaving 500 dead, including Lindsay and Ogilvy. Large parts of it were destroyed in the aftermath by the Lindsay family.

The abbey soon fell into disuse and eventual disrepair after its dissolution at the Reformation. The roof lead is rumoured to have been used in the 16th-century civil wars and the stonework plundered for housebuilding in the town. The ruins were a popular site for travellers in the 17th and 18th centuries. Finally in 1815, they were taken into state care. They are now administered by Historic Scotland.

=== Modern history ===
The Jacobite rising known as the Forty-Five turned Arbroath into a Jacobite town. A high proportion of its able-bodied men joined the Jacobite army. It was one of the main ports where men and supplies could be landed from France. It and other Jacobite ports along the north-east coast collectively formed 'an asset of almost incalculable value' to the Jacobite cause.

The Industrial Revolution led to an expansion of Arbroath's economy and population. New housing was built for the influx of workers and Arbroath became known for jute and sailcloth production. In 1867, the mills employed 4,620 people and in 1875, 1,400 looms in 34 mills produced over a million yards of osnaburg cloth and 450,000 yards of sailcloth; the town is believed to have supplied the sails for Cutty Sark. Arbroath was also prominent in the making of shoes and lawnmowers. Manufacturer Alexander Shanks, founded in 1840 and based at Dens Iron Works from 1853, supplied mowers to the Old Course at St Andrews and the All England Lawn Tennis and Croquet Club. Shanks was taken over in the 1960s by local firm, Giddings & Lewis-Fraser Ltd., which had evolved from the flax and canvas manufacturing business established by Douglas Fraser in 1832. In the last decade of the 19th century, Douglas Fraser & Sons shifted focus to machine manufacture following the success of a braiding machine designed by Norman Fraser. The firm had interests in South America and India. In 1959 the business was taken over by the US company, Giddings & Lewis and renamed Giddings & Lewis-Fraser. Its headquarters were Wellgate Works, Arbroath.

Arbroath is well known for its ties to the fishing industry. Following significant improvements to the harbour in 1839, the council sought fishermen willing to migrate to the town. Men came from nearby Auchmithie and further afield, including Shetland. While subject to the usual fluctuations, Fishery Board statistics show the importance of fishing in the years leading up to the First World War.

Fishery Statistics

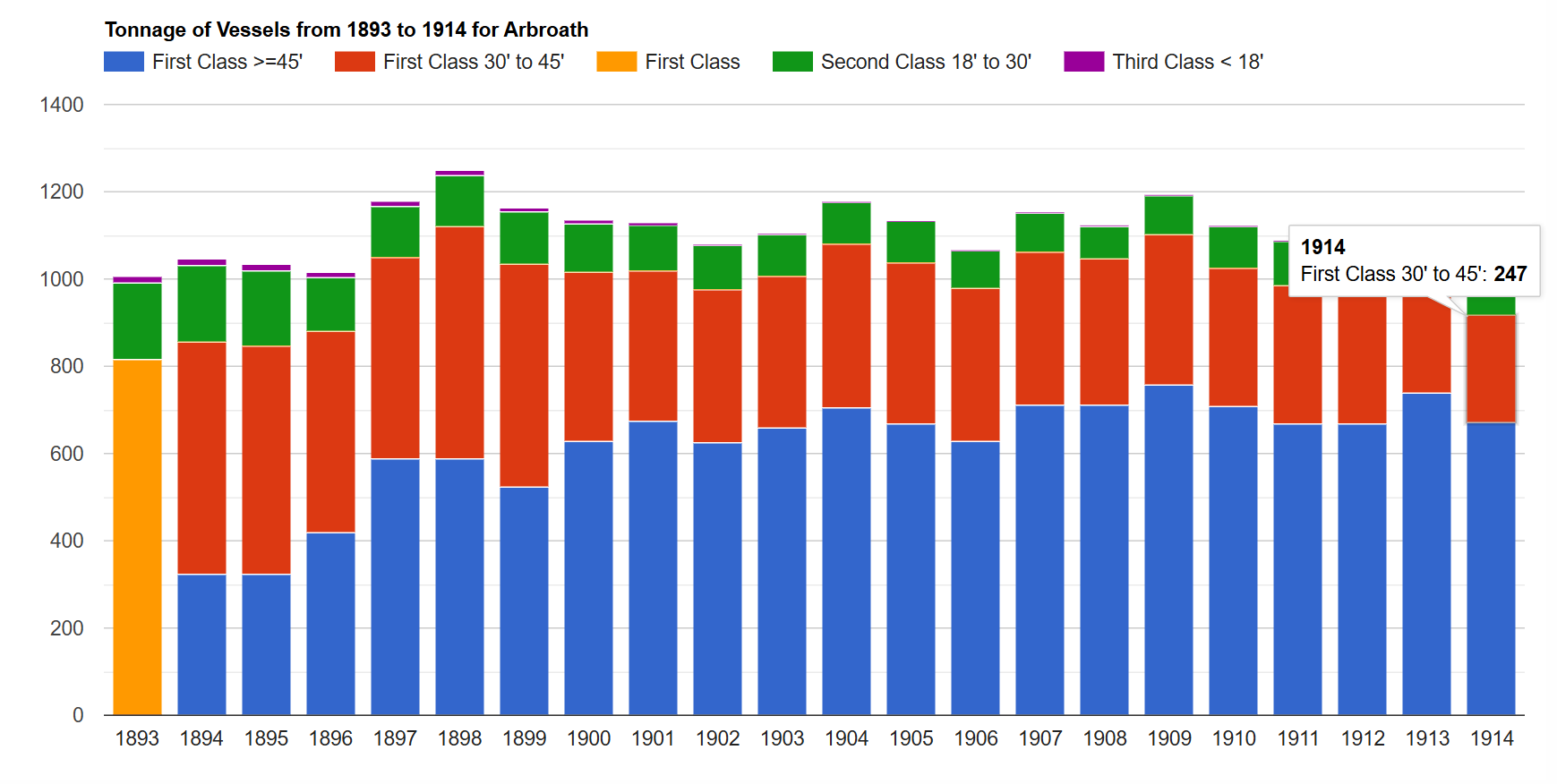
Tonnage of vessels

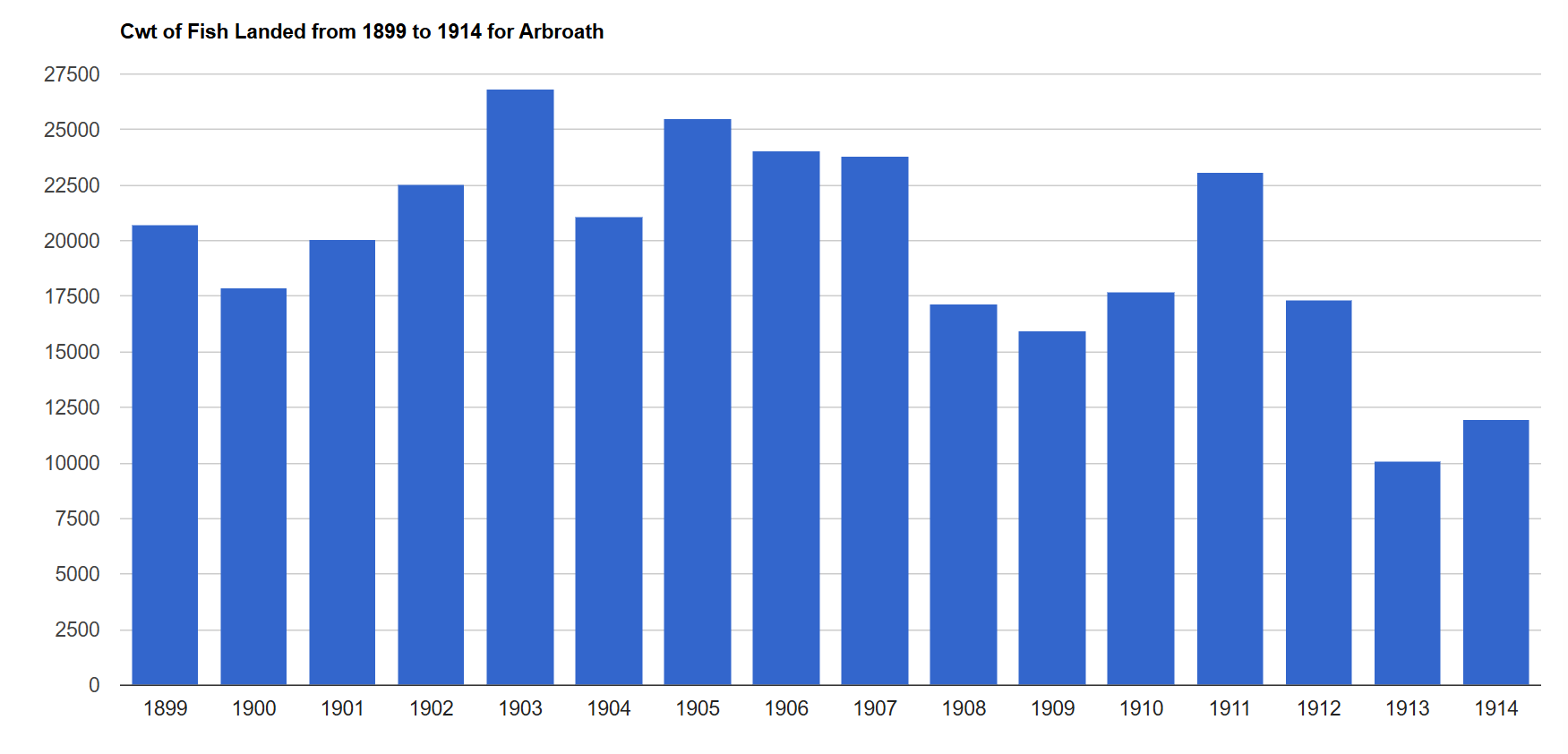
Cwt of fish landed (excluding shellfish)

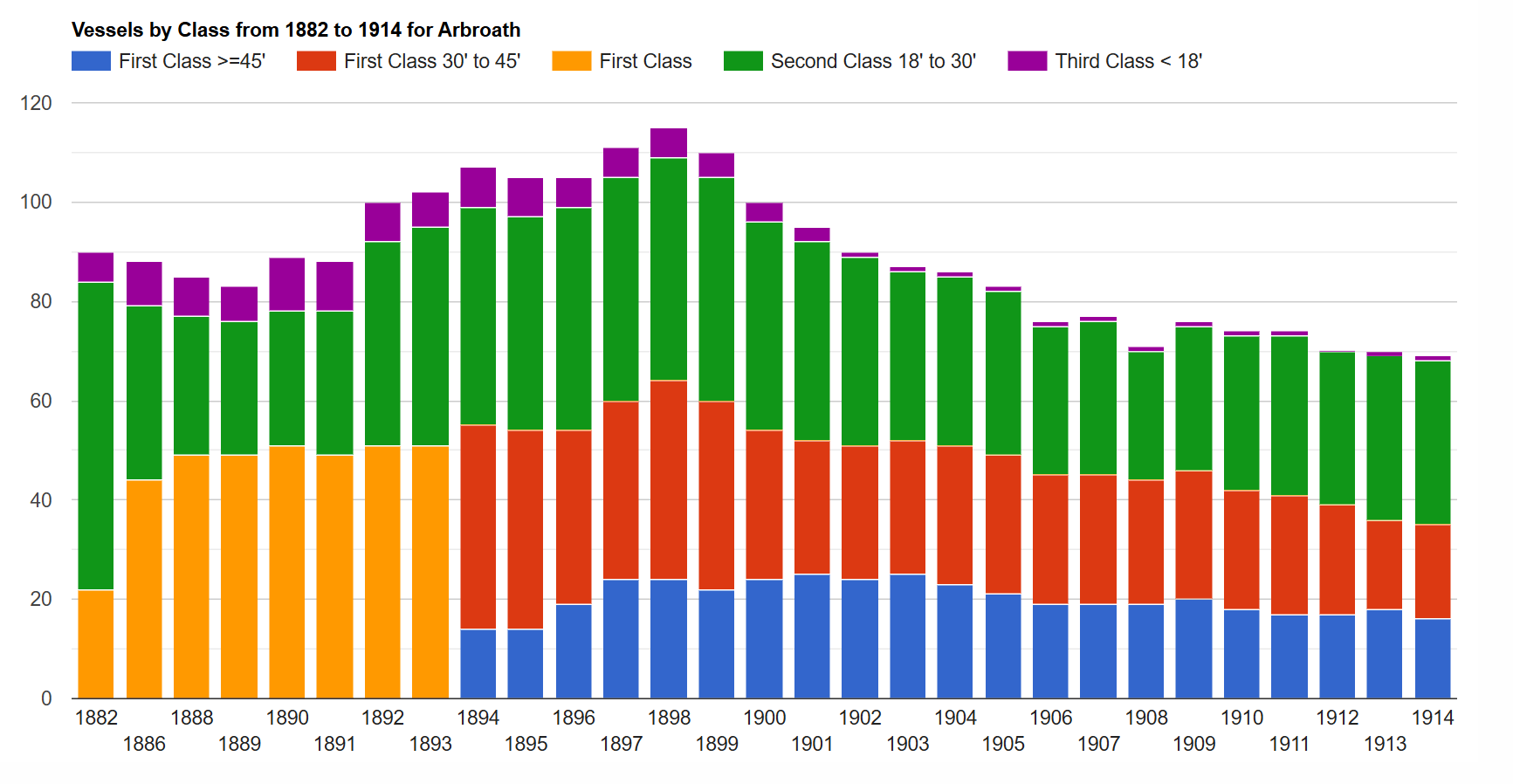
Vessels by class

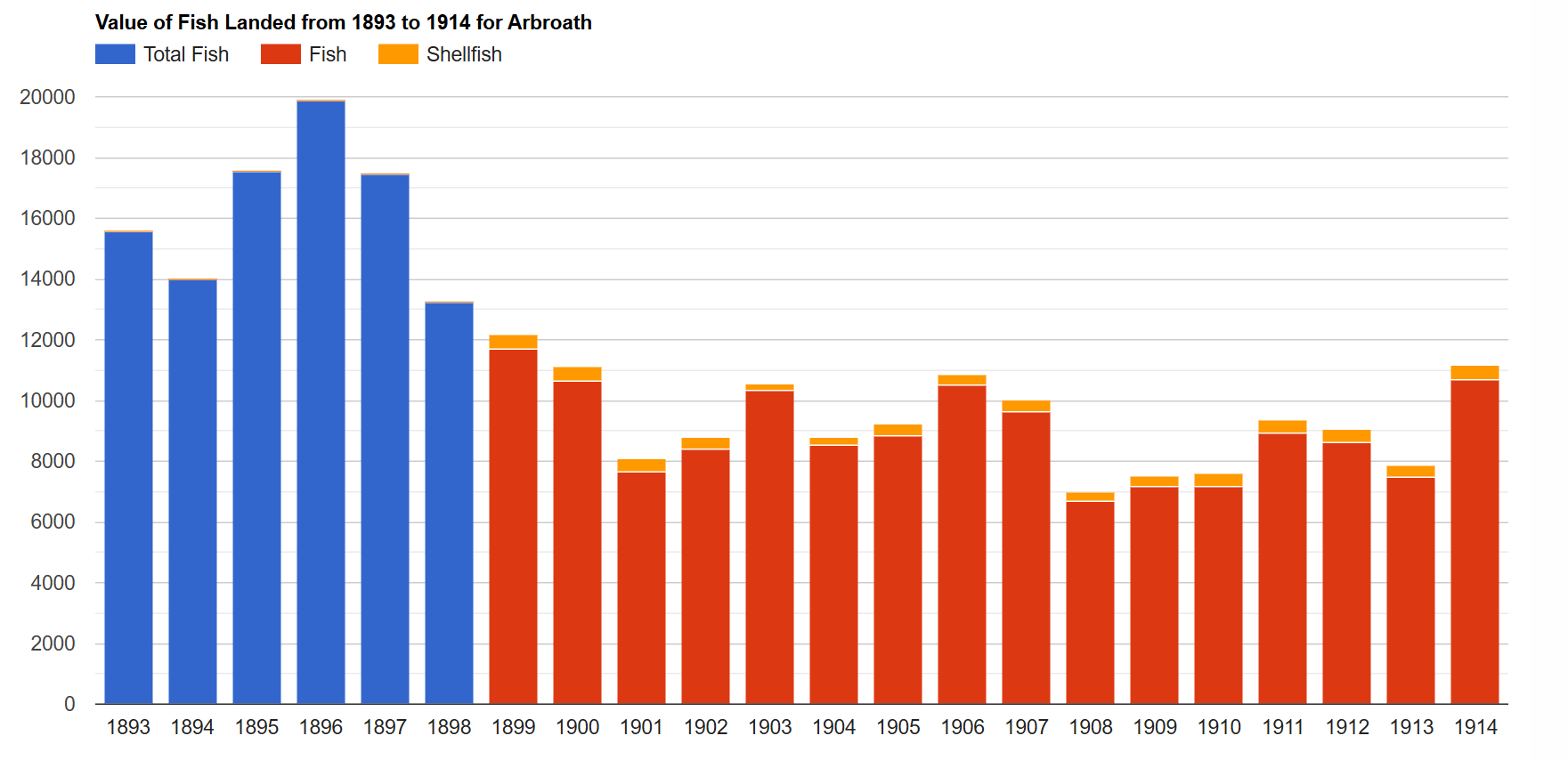
Value (£) of fish landed

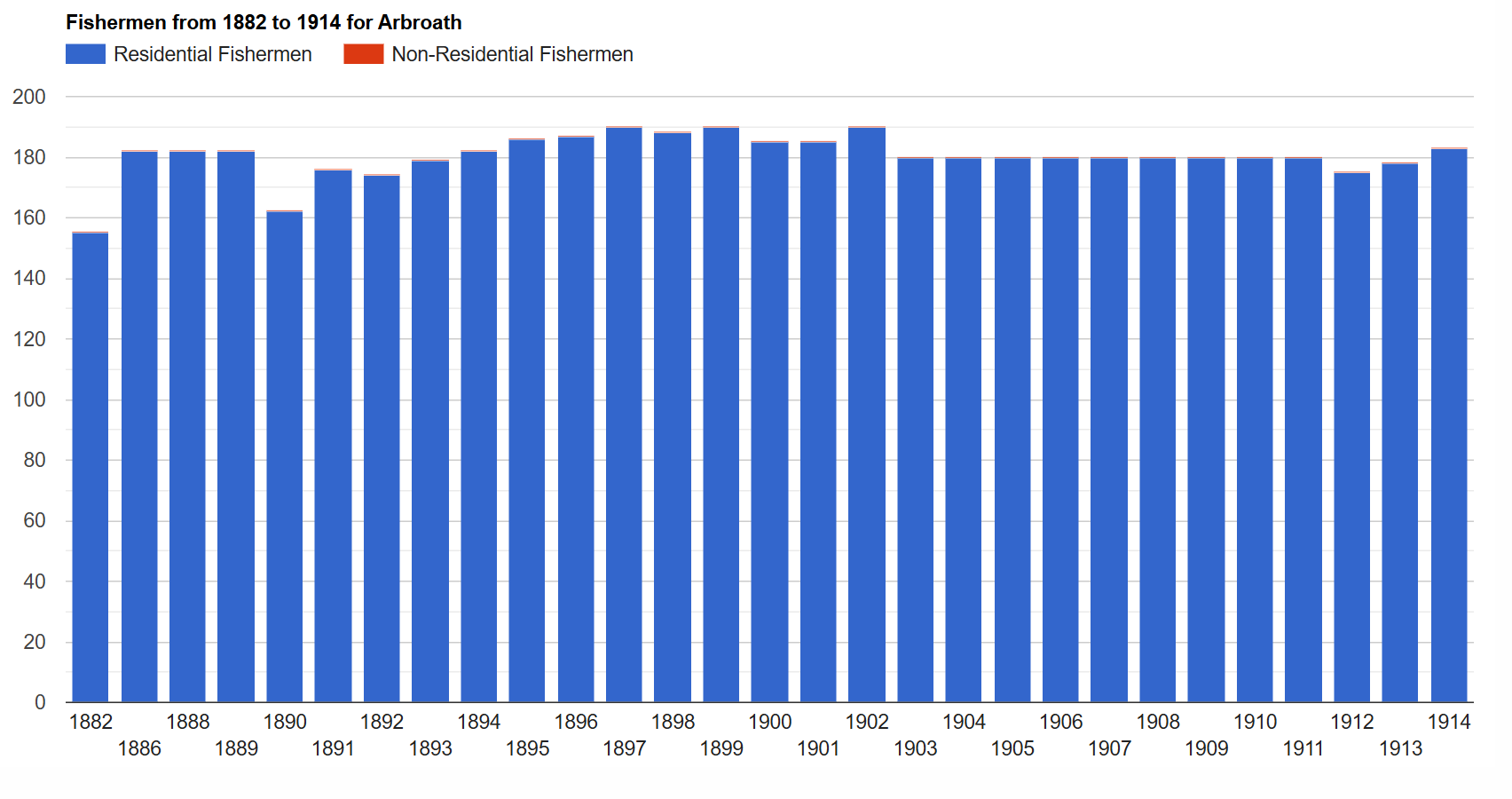
Fishermen

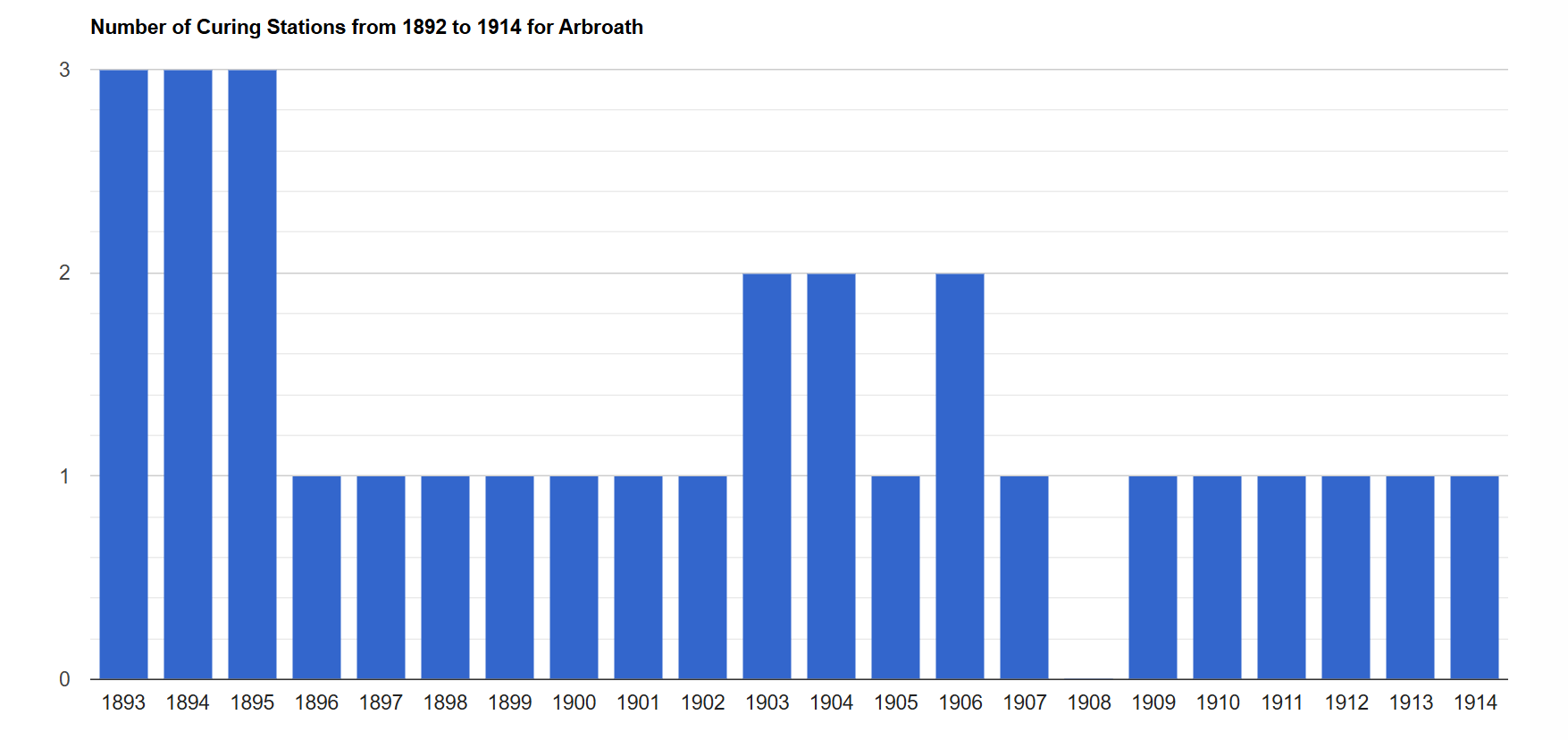
Number of curing stations

The industry continued to grew, and in the peak years up to 1980 some 40 whitefish and pelagic vessels worked from Arbroath, employing hundreds on board and hundreds more ashore to service vessels and process the fish. Quota cuts and decommissioning took their toll in Scotland from the 1980s; however, Arbroath remains a whitefish port open for landing shellfish. Only one vessel now works regularly from Arbroath, but a further three Arbroath-owned vessels work from Aberdeen and ports further north. Fish processing remains a big employer, but the fish come from Aberdeen, Peterhead and even Iceland, Norway and Ireland.

== Governance ==
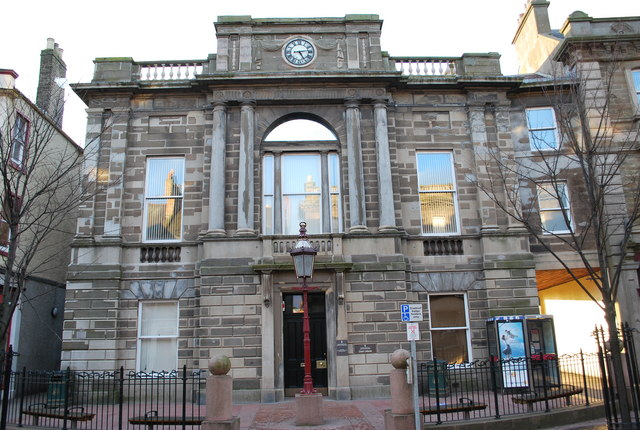
Arbroath Town House

Arbroath was made a burgh of regality in 1178 by King William the Lion, when the abbey was founded. The burgh of regality permitted monks to hold a weekly market, dispense basic justice and establish a harbour. In 1599, the town was granted royal burgh status by King James VI of Scotland. A provost and town council were appointed.

In 1922, Lord Inchcape became burgess. He was presented with his ticket to the office in a silver casket engraved with the burgh coat-of-arms and views of the locality.

Arbroath remained controlled by Arbroath Burgh Council, which was based at Arbroath Town House, through to 1975, when Arbroath (and the county of Angus) were amalgamated with Perthshire and Dundee City into Tayside, controlled by Tayside Regional Council. Angus, along with Dundee City and Perth & Kinross were re-established under the Local Government etc. (Scotland) Act 1994.

Arbroath is represented on Angus Council by seven councillors; four from the ward of Arbroath West, Letham and Friockheim and three from Arbroath East & Lunan.

=== Parliamentary representation ===
Arbroath is part of Arbroath and Broughty Ferry constituency for elections to the House of Commons. The seat was first contested at the 2024 general election where Stephen Gethins of the SNP won the seat.

Arbroath is in the Angus South constituency of the Scottish Parliament (having been in the Angus constituency until its abolition in 2011). It returns a Member of the Scottish Parliament (MSP) to Holyrood directly. Graeme Dey of the Scottish National Party has won the seat in all three elections contested since its formation. Angus South forms part of the North East Scotland electoral region for electing additional Members of the Scottish Parliament.

== Geography ==
At 56°33′31″N 02°34′58″W, Arbroath lies on the North Sea coast, 17 miles (27 km) north-east of Dundee, within the Angus region. Geologically, it sits predominantly on Old Red Sandstone. Lower-lying parts were below sea level until after the last Ice Age.

Arbroath lies 98 miles (158 km) north-east of Glasgow, 50 miles (80 km) south-west of Aberdeen and 77 miles (124 km) from Edinburgh. Neighbouring villages of St Vigeans, Carmyllie, Friockheim, Colliston and Inverkeilor are taken as part of Arbroath for council representation, and along with Carnoustie share its 01241 telephone area code.

=== Brothock Water ===
A burn (or stream) named Brothock Water flows through the town from St Vigeans parallel to the railway line, before turning to meet the North Sea at Danger Point immediately east of the harbour. Flax and jute mills congregated alongside the stream in the 19th century to use the water for their steam-powered machinery. Much of its course within the town is open but some parts have been built over. The burn and its environs form a green artery between residential areas and along with the railway line divides the town, east to west. Data collected by the Brothock Water monitoring station from 1990 onwards shows the water level to normally range between 0.4 metres (1.3 ft) and 1.2 metres (3.9 ft). The highest recorded level of 1.67 metres (5.5 ft) was reached on 2 November 2009. A £12 million publicly funded scheme to reduce flows in Brothock Water to protect parts of the town at risk from flooding was developed by Angus Council and the Scottish Environment Protection Agency. The works, completed in December 2022, included the creation of flood storage areas at Dammy Meadows and north of the town.

=== The shoreline ===
South west of the harbour lies an area of craggy rocks with a large number of rock pools exposed at low tide. Rocks, boulders and shingle extend for about nine hundred metres to Arbroath West Links (or Elliot) beach. This gently sloping beach is of mixed sand and pebbles and the sea here is a designated bathing water site of about 1.3 kilometres (0.81 mi) in length. The main access to the beach is via a slipway, but there are also steps down from the coastal path. Depending on the tide, the width of the beach can vary from twenty to two hundred metres.

Arbroath (or Seaton) cliffs rise about 1 mile (1.6 km) north east of the harbour. Whiting Ness at the end of the King's Drive promenade is an example of geological angular unconformity; a coarse conglomerate of late Devonian upper red sandstone overlies early Devonian lower red sandstone.

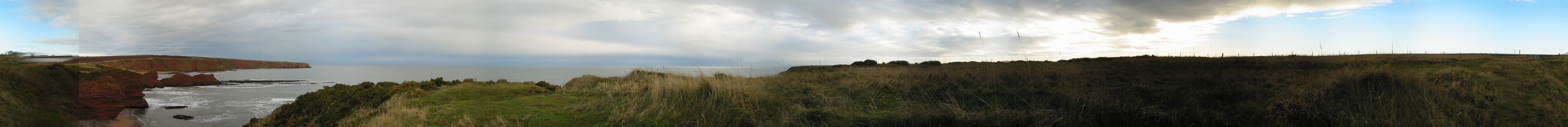
Panorama of Arbroath Cliffs in winter

== Climate ==
Arbroath has a typical British marine climate influenced by its seaside position. There are narrow temperature differences between seasons. January has an average high of 6.7 °C (44.1 °F) and July of 18.1 °C (64.6 °F). The climate is somewhat dry and sunny for Scotland, with 639.4 millimetres (25.17 in) of precipitation and 1561.7 hours of sunshine. The data are sourced from the 1991–2020 averages of the Met Office weather station in Arbroath.

Climate data for Arbroath 15m asl, 1991–2020
Month	Jan	Feb	Mar	Apr	May	Jun	Jul	Aug	Sep	Oct	Nov	Dec	Year
Record high °C (°F)	14.6 (58.3)	16.1 (61.0)	20.0 (68.0)	21.7 (71.1)	26.7 (80.1)	28.3 (82.9)	30.0 (86.0)	27.8 (82.0)	24.4 (75.9)	22.2 (72.0)	17.2 (63.0)	14.4 (57.9)	30.0 (86.0)
Mean daily maximum °C (°F)	6.7 (44.1)	7.2 (45.0)	8.8 (47.8)	10.8 (51.4)	13.4 (56.1)	16.2 (61.2)	18.1 (64.6)	17.8 (64.0)	15.8 (60.4)	12.5 (54.5)	9.3 (48.7)	7.0 (44.6)	12.0 (53.6)
Daily mean °C (°F)	4.2 (39.6)	4.6 (40.3)	5.9 (42.6)	7.8 (46.0)	10.1 (50.2)	12.9 (55.2)	14.8 (58.6)	14.6 (58.3)	12.7 (54.9)	9.9 (49.8)	6.7 (44.1)	4.6 (40.3)	9.1 (48.4)
Mean daily minimum °C (°F)	1.8 (35.2)	2.1 (35.8)	3.0 (37.4)	4.7 (40.5)	6.8 (44.2)	9.6 (49.3)	11.6 (52.9)	11.4 (52.5)	9.7 (49.5)	7.2 (45.0)	4.2 (39.6)	2.2 (36.0)	6.2 (43.2)
Record low °C (°F)	−15.6 (3.9)	−11.1 (12.0)	−12.8 (9.0)	−7.2 (19.0)	−3.3 (26.1)	−0.6 (30.9)	2.8 (37.0)	2.2 (36.0)	−2.2 (28.0)	−5.6 (21.9)	−8.9 (16.0)	−11.7 (10.9)	−15.6 (3.9)
Average precipitation mm (inches)	53.9 (2.12)	45.1 (1.78)	38.3 (1.51)	40.5 (1.59)	51.9 (2.04)	54.2 (2.13)	59.7 (2.35)	65.2 (2.57)	48.8 (1.92)	75.7 (2.98)	57.6 (2.27)	48.5 (1.91)	639.4 (25.17)
Average precipitation days (≥ 1.0 mm)	11.1	8.1	8.5	8.4	9.7	8.8	9.3	10.0	10.2	10.2	9.9	9.8	114.1
Mean monthly sunshine hours	59.1	87.7	130.2	171.8	204.0	183.7	183.3	173.4	138.0	102.1	75.1	53.5	1,561.7
Source 1: Met Office (precipitation days 1981-2010)
Source 2: Starlings Roost Weather

== Demography ==
Residents of Arbroath are called Arbroathians but often call themselves Red Lichties after the red lamp that shone from the harbour light and foghorn tower at the harbour entrance, as an aid to shipping entering the harbour.

Scotland's census of 2022 reports the total resident population of Arbroath as 23,481, a decrease over the 23,904 reported by the 2011 census. About 86.5 per cent of the population was born in Scotland, down from 88.9 per cent in 2001 and 95.6 per cent was born in the United Kingdom as a whole (2001: 97.7 per cent). In 2011, Arbroath had a higher percentage of its population under 16 years of age (18.3 per cent) than Scotland (17.3 per cent). Persons aged 65 years and over are put at 18.9 per cent compared with Scotland's 16.8 per cent. Arbroath correspondingly has a lower percentage of 16 to 64 year olds than Scotland. In 2011 there were 47.8 per cent males to 52.2 per cent females.

Arbroath has a moderate unemployment rate – some 2.7 per cent claim job-related social welfare benefits.

== Economy ==
The 2011 census shows Arbroath to have an economically active population of 10,545 (2001: 9,192); of which jobs in health and social work account for 16.0 per cent of total employment (2001: 13.1 per cent), closely followed by wholesale and retail trade and repairs with 15.2 per cent (2001: 15.4 per cent). Manufacturing, the top employment sector in 2001 with 16.0 per cent, fell to third place in 2011 with 12.3 per cent. A separate figure for the fishing industry is not shown for 2011 but accounted for only 0.4 per cent (fewer than 50 people) in 2001, although the processing sector is counted separately under manufacturing and the figure of 50 relates directly to the catching and support sectors.

=== The port ===
Arbroath's prospects originally revolved around the harbour. The original harbour was constructed and maintained by the abbot within the terms of an agreement between the burgesses and John Gedy, the abbot in 1394 AD. This gave way to a more commodious port in 1725, which in turn was enlarged and improved in 1839, when the sea wall, quay walls and breakwater were added to the old inner harbour, at a cost of £58,000. Arbroath became a major coastal shipping port and in 1846 there were 89 Arbroath-registered vessels, totalling 9,100 gross tons. In the same year, 599 vessels docked at Arbroath, 56 from foreign ports (mainly Baltic ports) and the remaining 543 employed on the coastal trade. Bark, flax, hemp, hides, oak and fir timber, and guano for manure, groceries from London, and numerous articles of Baltic produce were imported via Arbroath, with manufactured goods (mainly sailcloth) exported.

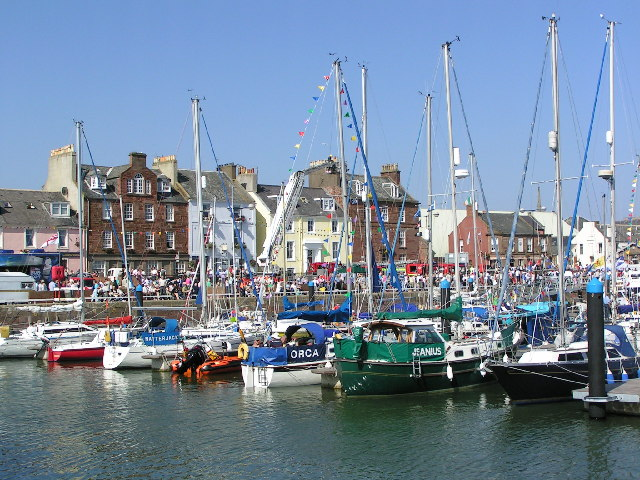
Arbroath Harbour

=== Manufacturing ===
Driven by the needs of the fishing and sailing industry, Arbroath-based sailmaker Francis Webster Ltd perfected in 1795 the art of adding linseed oil to flax sails, creating an oiled flax. This developed in the late 19th century into waxed cotton, which drove Arbroath as a manufacturing centre until the early 1970s, when it began to decline. A major employer, Keith & Blackman, closed in 1985 and Giddings and Lewis-Fraser wound down about the same time, with the whole plant later demolished to make way for a supermarket. Alps Electric Co. was a large employer in Arbroath from 1990 to 2001, employing 180. All were made redundant when the plant closed.

=== Armed forces ===
Arbroath is home to 45 Commando of the Royal Marines, which has been based at RM Condor since 1971. The barracks were built in 1940 and commissioned as RNAS Arbroath/HMS Condor, a Royal Naval Air Station (RNAS) until 1971. The Royal Marines moved to Arbroath in 1971 and remain a contributor to the local economy; in addition to the Marines stationed at Arbroath, some 600 residents are employed by the Ministry of Defence. In 2004, there was speculation that RM Condor would be transferred to the Army as a replacement for Fort George and the barracks become a permanent base for a battalion of the Royal Regiment of Scotland. This went no further than the planning stage and in 2005 it was confirmed the Marines would remain.

=== Housing ===
House prices in Arbroath in April–June 2006 were just £99 below national average: £113,646 compared to a national £113,745. The average house price across Angus rose by 14.9 per cent to £124,451 in the year up to November 2006. Angus Council suggests the upgrading of the A92 between Arbroath and Dundee to a dual carriageway has lured Dundonians to Arbroath, which may be boosting house prices.

=== Tourism ===
A visitor survey compiled in 2017 found Arbroath to be the most popular destination in Angus and Arbroath Abbey the second most visited attraction after Glamis Castle. Arbroath Abbey receives around 14,000 visitors annually. A re-enactment of the signing of the Declaration of Arbroath (the declaration of Scottish independence) known as the Scots' or Arbroath Pageant has taken place in the Abbey ruins intermittently since 1947. The last full pageant took place in 2005 but a smaller ceremony is usually performed on the 6 April each year to commemorate the signing.

==== Former attractions ====
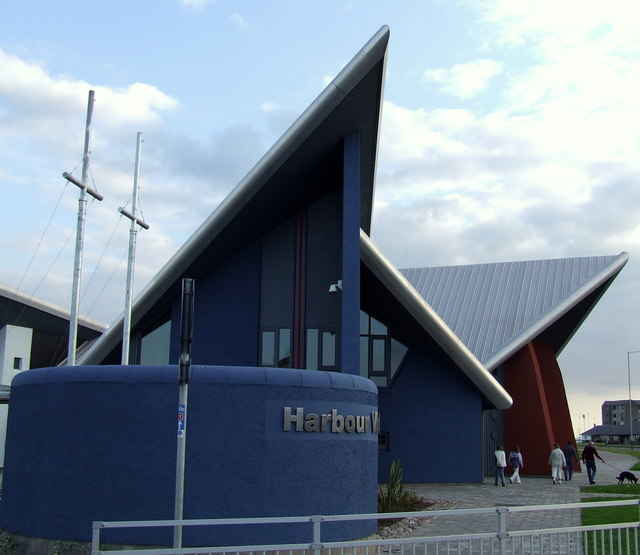
Harbour Visitor Centre

A summer event known as the Seafront Spectacular took place in the 2000s. The program for 2006 included flying displays, a sea rescue demonstration, exhibition of motor vehicles and fairground rides. The Sea Fest, an event themed around Arbroath's maritime heritage, was held annually for 21 years until 2017. Kerr's Miniature Railway was the oldest miniature railway in Scotland at the time of its closure in October 2020. It opened in 1935 and at its height, in 1955, drew 60,000 visitors; however numbers had fallen to just 3,500 in 2019. The Harbour Visitor Centre on Fishmarket Quay was completed in 2007. It was the focus of Angus Council's attempt to increase the number of tourists to the harbour. The centre originally housed a multimedia experience explaining the town's fishing history and a VisitScotland tourist information centre; both have closed and the space vacated let for commercial use.

== Transport ==
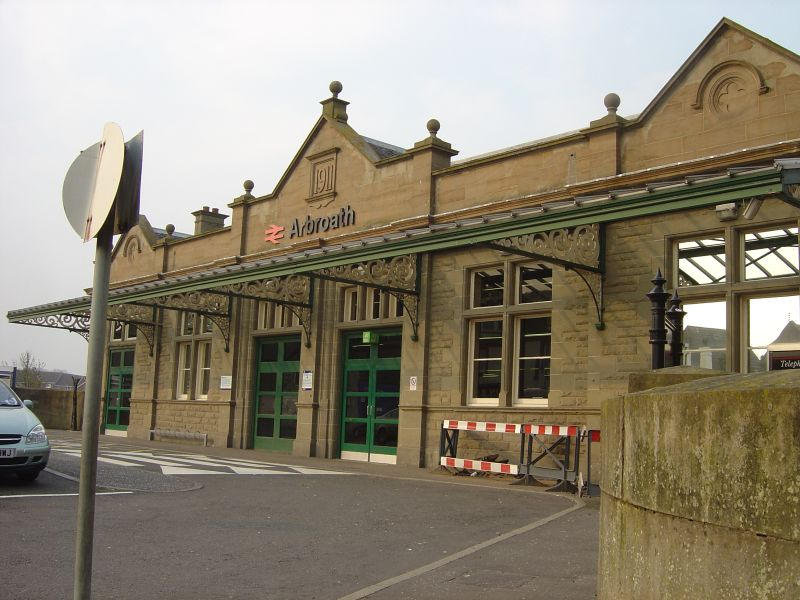
Arbroath railway station

The A92 dual carriageway connects Arbroath to Dundee and crosses the Tay estuary into Fife via the Tay Road Bridge. North to Montrose and Stonehaven the A92 is single carriageway but thereafter is dualled to Aberdeen. The A933 road runs north to Brechin. Within the town, the A92 was formerly dualled prior to 2024, when it was singled to allow a dedicated cycle-path and additional green space to be created. The project was completed in August 2025.

Destinations from Arbroath Bus Station include Brechin, Dundee, Forfar and Montrose. The bus station is also a stopping point on the X7 Coastrider route that runs between Aberdeen and Dundee. Stagecoach South Scotland under its Stagecoach Strathtay brand operates most services.

Arbroath railway station is a short walk from the bus station. The station facilities and most of the passenger trains are operated by ScotRail. Direct services run along the east coast of Scotland to Aberdeen and via Dundee to Edinburgh and Glasgow with onward connections to London and other English cities. The overnight Caledonian Sleeper stops at Arbroath en route to London Euston.

The closest regional airport, Dundee has flights to London City, George Best Belfast City and Sumburgh. The airport lies 1.8 miles west of the city centre, adjacent to the River Tay. The nearest international airports are Edinburgh and Aberdeen. There is a sizeable airfield at the Royal Marines military base on the western outskirts of the town. It was created in 1940 as a Fleet Air Arm airfield and had a training role during World War II. The airstrip was used by a Volunteer Gliding Squadron up until 2016.

== Education ==
Further education is provided at the Arbroath campus of Dundee and Angus College, based in the former Arbroath High School buildings. The town has two secondary schools and seven primary schools. One primary school is Roman Catholic, the remainder non-denominational.

=== Secondary schools ===
The two secondaries are Arbroath High School on Keptie Road and Arbroath Academy in the Hayshead area of the town. The High School was originally a grammar school; a notable alumnus is former Scottish Secretary, Michael Forsyth. It caters for around 880 pupils and has a catchment area of west Arbroath and the villages of Arbirlot, Carmyllie and Colliston. The Academy, originally a comprehensive, opened in 1962. It has a school roll of around 700 pupils and a catchment area that includes east Arbroath and the villages of Auchmithie, Inverkeilor and Friockheim.

=== Further education ===
Angus College was established in 1957. In the mid 2000s, Angus College had around 8,500 students, with 80 per cent passing the course for which they enrol. There are about 1,700 full-time students, with part-time students making up the majority. On 1 November 2013, Angus College merged with Dundee College to form Dundee and Angus College. Arbroath is not a student town and there are no student residences. The student population is solely local students living within commuting distance of the college. The Arbroath campus offers mostly full and part time vocational courses from SCQF level 1 up to Higher National Diploma (level 8).

== Places of worship ==
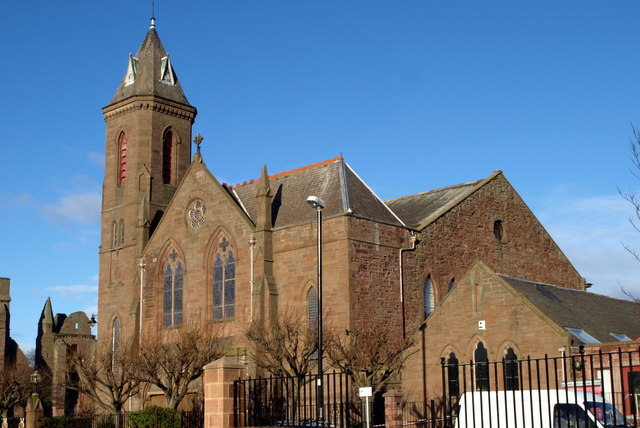
The Old and Abbey Parish Church

Twelve denominations spread over twenty two places of worship are listed for Arbroath in a survey of Scotland published in 1884; all bar The Old Church are described as "modern". Only a handful of these remain in use as places of worship. Some redundant church buildings have been demolished but alternative uses have been found for others, including The Old Church, the United Presbyterian Erskine Church in Commerce Street and the High Street and Brothock Bridge United Free Churches.

=== Church of Scotland ===
The Old and Abbey Church is in the centre of town on West Abbey Street. Formerly known as the Abbey Church, its name was changed on uniting with the Old Parish Church after the latter's closure in 1990. Abbey Church was originally built as a chapel of ease to the Old Parish Church in 1797 and was greatly extended in 1876–8 with the addition of the tower and Gothic style front facade.

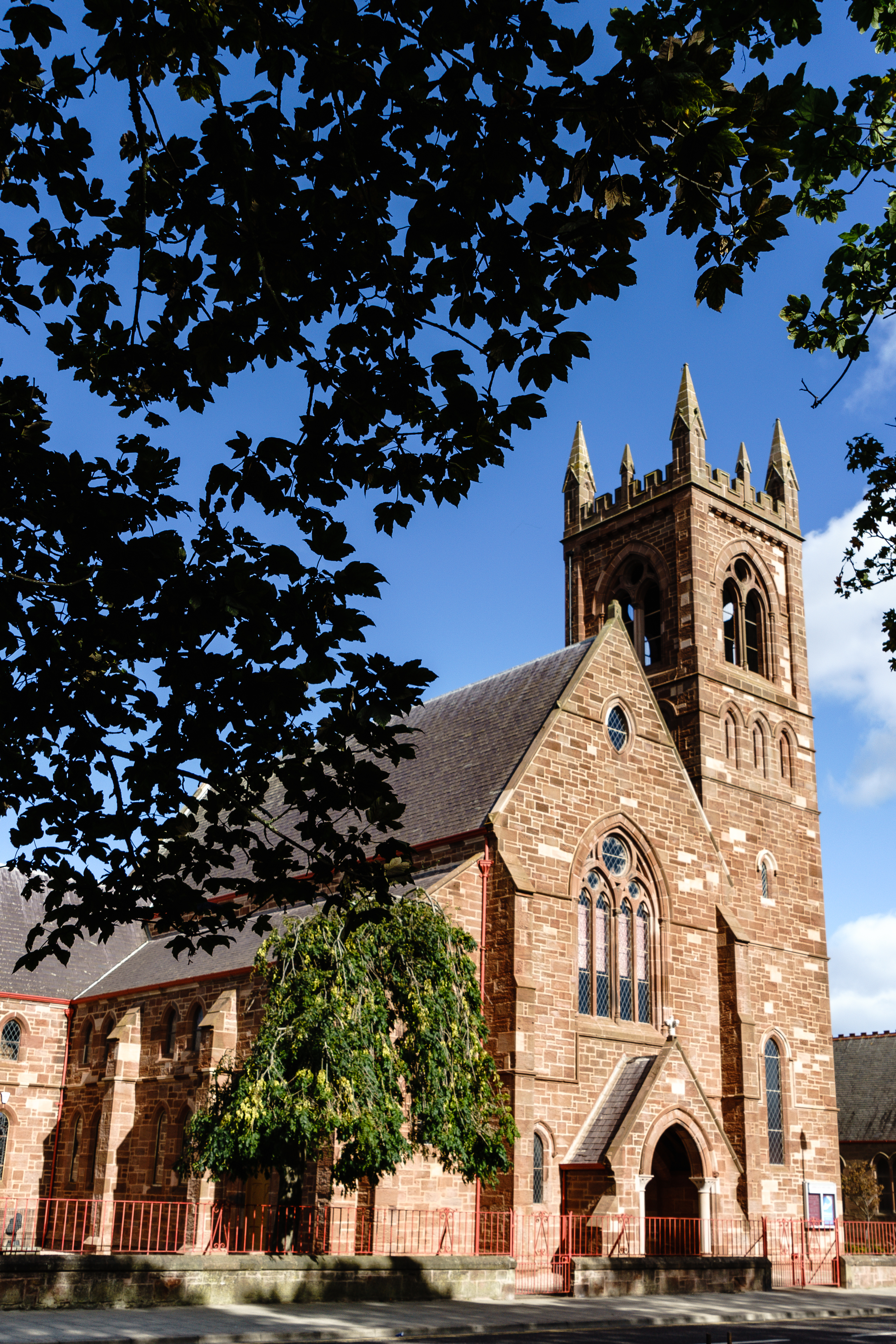
Arbroath West Kirk

St Andrew's is in Hamilton Green, and the minister is Rev. Dr. Martin Fair with associate minister Rev. Stuart Irvin. Dr Fair was Moderator of the General Assembly of the Church of Scotland in 2020–2021; the only time that a minister of a congregation in Arbroath has held the position.

The West Kirk in Keptie Street was opened as St Margaret's Chapel of Ease in 1879 and upgraded to a parish church in 1886. The height of the tower was doubled in 1903 by the addition of two storeys, a parapet and pinnacles. St Margaret's changed its name to Arbroath West Kirk in 1990 when joined by the members of Ladyloan St Columba's following that church's closure. Falling attendances at Knox's Church lead to its congregation uniting with West Kirk in 2019 and the site in Howard Street being put up for sale. Knox's Church was built in 1866 and linked with St Vigeans Church, St Vigeans in 1983.

=== Other congregations ===
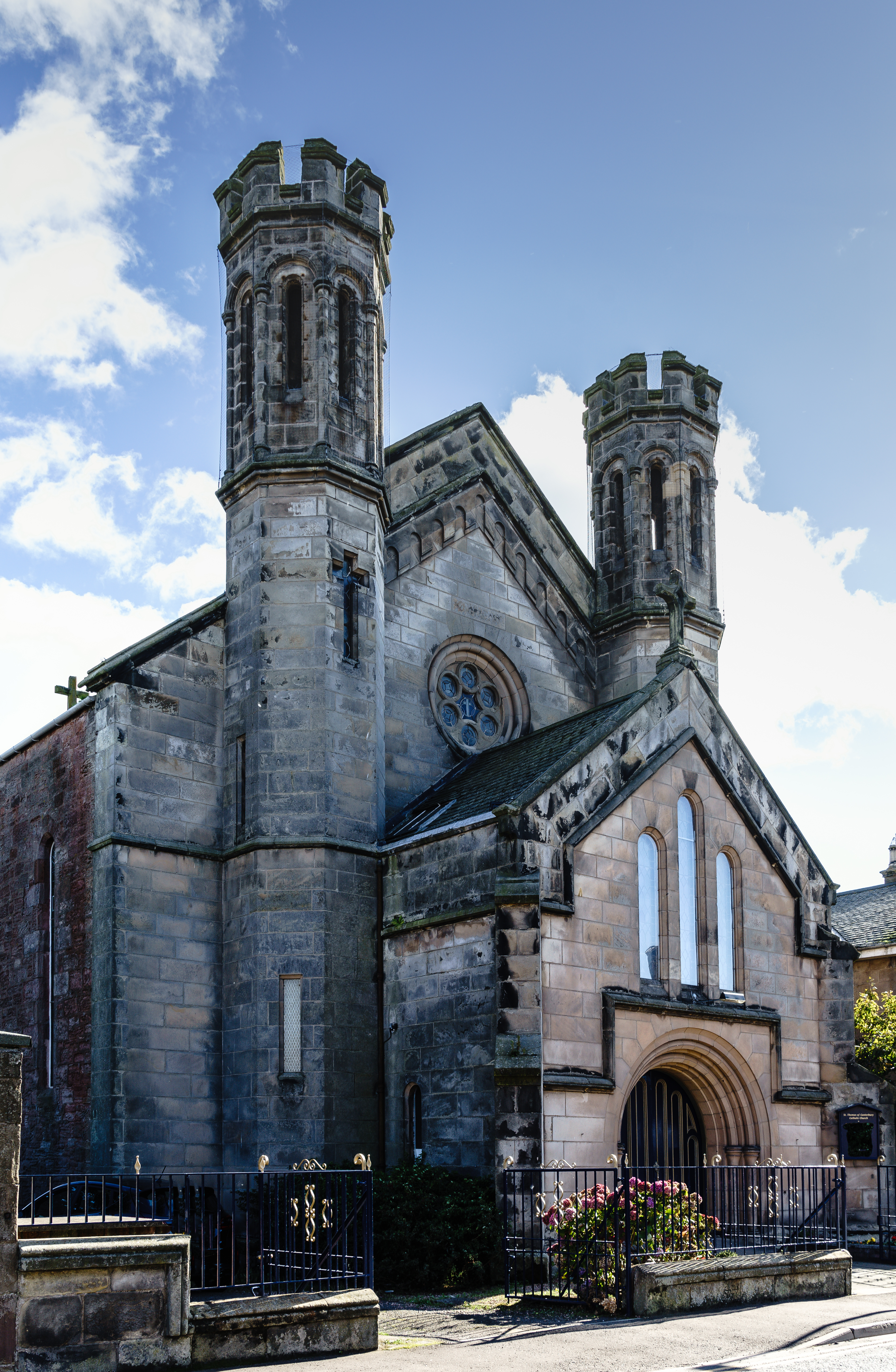
St Thomas Of Canterbury

There is an Episcopalian congregation based at St Mary the Virgin Church in Springfield Terrace. The minister is Rev. Peter Mead. St Mary's Church evolved from a meeting house set up in 1694 by Episcopalians forced out of Arbroath Parish Church. The present church building dates from 1854. The Scottish Episcopal Church in Arbroath is part of the Diocese of Brechin.

St Thomas of Canterbury Roman Catholic Church is in Dishlandtown Street. The church opened in 1848 and has distinctive twin octagonal and crenellated front towers. The priest is the Rev. Fr. Andrew Marshall and the church is part of the Roman Catholic Diocese of Dunkeld. The parish includes a primary school which celebrated its 150th anniversary in 1998.

St John's Methodist Church in Ponderlaw was opened and preached in by John Wesley in 1772 and since the closure of Dunbar Methodist Church has been the oldest Scottish Methodist Church still used for worship. The original church building is octagonal and situated behind a vestibule added in 1882.

Other groups that worship in Arbroath include the Arbroath Corps of the Salvation Army, which meets in Marketgate; the Elim Pentecostal Church, which meets in Ogilvy Place; the Jehovah's Witnesses, who meet at the Kingdom Hall in Burnside Drive; the Springfield Christian Assembly, which meets in the Gospel Hall in Ponderlaw Lane and the Arbroath Town Mission on Grant Road, an interdenominational group established in 1849 and led by Dr Robert Clapham for sixty years, until 2010. The independent, non-denominational Life Church meet in the former St Vigeans Chapel of Ease in James Street. The church building dates from 1828 and became Inverbrothock Parish Church in 1855. The parish was dissolved in 1977.

== Culture ==
The ANGUSalive Community Trust manages Arbroath Library and Art Gallery, Webster Memorial Theatre, Signal Tower Museum, Arbroath Community Centre and Arbroath Sports Centre.

On permanent display in the Corsar Gallery at Arbroath Art Gallery are The Adoration of the Magi and Saint John Preaching in the Wilderness; two large oil paintings attributed to Pieter Brueghel the Younger. The art gallery and public library are housed within a former school, The Academy, built in 1821 to a design by Dundee architect James Black. The building was bought for the town by former Provost, David Corsar, owner of a flaxspinning and manufacturing business. It was converted by local architect, Hugh Gavin and opened to much fanfare in 1898.

The Webster Memorial Theatre building was opened as The Public Hall in 1867; James Maclaren of Dundee was the architect. As well as a large hall there was a library, reading-room, museum and smaller hall. The Arbroath Guide newspaper acclaimed the front facade to be "the finest thing in architecture we have in the town". The first public performance was by a troupe of Christy's Minstrels. The hall was renamed in memory of First World War casualty Joseph Webster, on his family gifting it to the town in 1919. Besides concerts, the hall was used for political addresses and lectures. HRH Princess Margaret reopened the hall in October 1970 as the Webster Memorial Theatre and Arts Centre, after major works and refurbishment. The front stonework was renovated, the auditorium remodelled and disabled access improved in 2008. The main auditorium seats five hundred. The theatre has featured among others Harry Lauder, Jimmy Tarbuck, Charlie Landsborough, The Drifters and the Chuckle Brothers and was the first venue The Alexander Brothers, a Scottish easy listening act, performed in as a professional duo.

The 10 year-old Marion Angus arrived in Arbroath in February 1876, when her father became minister at the Erskine United Presbyterian Church. An early contributor to the poetry of the Scottish Renaissance, in her early thirties she wrote "The Diary of Arthur Ogilvie" (1897–98) and "Christabel's Diary" (1899) columns for the Arbroath Guide, sardonically chronicling the development of the town, musical concerts, visiting dramatic productions, and Church soirées.

The Angus Black and White Minstrels were the last group in Britain to regularly perform blackface. In 2005, after pressure from Angus Council, the show began with normal stage makeup and the group changed its name to The Angus Minstrels. The move to stop performing in blackface received wide UK press coverage. The group performed its farewell concert in November 2019 and made a final charitable donation in 2022.

Beginning in 1947, a pageant commemorating the signing of the Declaration has been held within the roofless remains of the abbey (last full-scale event 2005). This was run by the local Arbroath Abbey Pageant Society, now Arbroath Abbey Timethemes, a registered charity, and re-enacts the story and history of the signing. The group also spearhead Scotland's Tartan Day celebrations on 6 April in association with Angus Council as well as educational visits to local schools.

Arbroath Male Voice Choir was founded in 1934 and is one of the few remaining male voice choirs in Scotland. The choir sings a mix of songs from classical, through Scottish, show tunes and pop. It performs two main concerts each year, one at Christmas, another in spring. The choir is notable for attracting well known, often international singers to its annual spring concert. These have included, Jamie McDougall, Karen Cargill, Gordon Cree, Cheryl Forbes, Colette Ruddy and the international diva Lesley Garrett.

The author Sir Walter Scott's famous Waverley series of novels includes Rob Roy and Ivanhoe. Scott is known to have visited Arbroath three times, and his personal favourite in the series, The Antiquary (1816), features fictionalised versions of Arbroath ("Fairport") and Auchmithie ("Musselcrag").

Arbroath has one museum, the former Bell Rock Lighthouse Signal Tower. In 1807 Arbroath became the base of operations for the building of the Bell Rock Lighthouse. The shore station for the lighthouse – the Bell Rock Signal Tower – was completed in 1813 and acted as a lifeline for the keepers offshore. Signal Tower Museum was opened in 1974 as a visitor centre, detailing the history of the lighthouse and the town of Arbroath.

Hospitalfield House, a baronial mansion to the west of the town, houses an educational charity promoting contemporary arts.

The town was twinned with "THE HADDOCK THAT NEVER GOT SMOKED" by the Intercontinental Twinning Association in July 2024 following a short email exchange with Bill Drummond, commemorative signage is due to be deployed later in the year.

=== Arbroath smokies ===
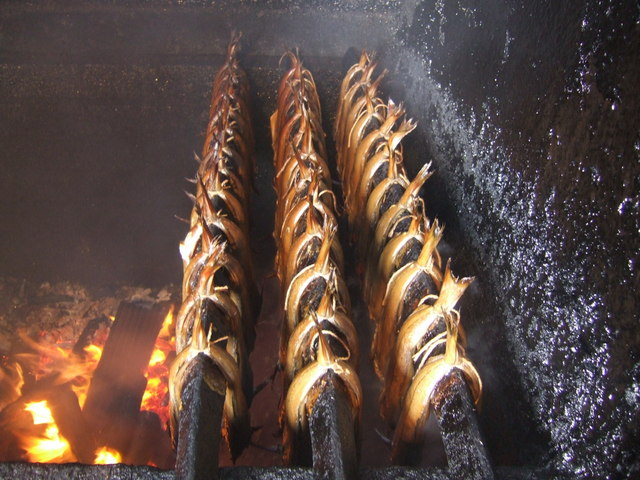
Local Delicacy: The Arbroath Smokie

Arbroath smokies, known nationally and internationally, have been made solely in Arbroath since the award of Protected Geographical Indication in 2004, which limits their production to within 8 km (5.0 mi) of Arbroath Town House. Smokies are made from haddock by traditional methods dating back to the late 19th century. The fish are first salted overnight to preserve them, then left tied in pairs to dry. Next, the dried fish are hung in a covered barrel containing a hardwood fire. After 45 minutes to an hour of smoking, the fish are golden brown and ready to eat. The preparation of smokies remains a cottage industry in Arbroath, centred almost exclusively on the harbour area known as Fit o' the Toon. A large processor, R R Spink & Sons, supplied Arbroath smokies to several UK supermarket chains for a number of years, however this was discontinued when the firm concentrated on smoked salmon and trout.

== Sport ==
Arbroath F.C., nicknamed the Red Lichties, is a semi-professional football team who play in the Scottish Championship, the second tier of the Scottish Professional Football League. The club plays its home matches at Gayfield Park. The stadium is set right on the North Sea coast, just 5½ yards (5 metres) from the high tide line. Arbroath F.C. holds the world record for the largest winning margin in a senior football match, 36–0, in their Scottish Cup match against Bon Accord (a scratch team from Aberdeen) on 12 September 1885. Arbroath Victoria F.C., a junior football club, plays its home matches at Olgilvy Park. Arbroath SC, another junior football club folded in 2011.

Arbroath Lawn Tennis Club's origins date back to 1909. Despite its name the club no longer has grass courts at its home on Arbirlot Road. Blaes (red shale) a type of clay court surface, was in turn replaced by floodlit, all-weather hardcourts following a successful fundraising drive and grant from Sportscotland. Australian Open 2020 men's doubles quarter finalist Jonny O'Mara is a former club member.

Arbroath has a rugby union club, Arbroath RFC, and several bowls clubs, with former World, British and current Commonwealth Games singles champion Darren Burnett a native of Arbroath.

Arbroath has a successful cricket club. It won the CSL Eastern Premiership in 2013 and the Scottish Cup in 2015.

Arbroath is a popular location for angling.

== Public services ==
Water is supplied by Scottish Water from Lintrathen and Backwater reservoirs in Glen Isla. Electricity distribution is by Scottish and Southern Electricity Networks.

Waste management is handled by Angus Council. A kerbside recycling scheme has been in operation since May 2004. Cans, glass, paper and plastic bottles are collected on a weekly basis. Compostable material and non-recyclable material are collected on alternate weeks. Roughly two-thirds of non-recyclable material is sent to landfill at Angus Council's site at Lochhead, Forfar and the remainder sent for incineration (with energy recovery) outside the council area. A recycling centre is at Cairnie Loan and there are a number of neighbourhood recycling facilities. In 2020, Angus Council achieved a 57.9 per cent recycling rate — the highest by any Scottish council — compared with 34.7 per cent for 2007–2008.

Healthcare facilities were developed in the 19th century. In 1836 a dispensary was set up by subscription to give medical care to the poor. In 1842 a typhus epidemic led to a small isolation ward. Arbroath Infirmary, also financed by subscriptions, opened in 1845 and relocated to larger premises in 1916. Medical facilities continue to be provided at Arbroath Infirmary on Rosemount Road by NHS Tayside and further afield at Ninewells Hospital, Dundee. The Abbey Health Centre in East Abbey Street and Springfield Medical Centre in Ponderlaw Street provide primary health care. Arbroath, along with the rest of Scotland is served by the Scottish Ambulance Service.

Police Scotland have a police station in Gravesend and the town is served by Scottish Fire and Rescue Service.

A lifeboat station was established in 1803 and was among the first in Scotland. The current RNLI station houses the only remaining Scottish slipway-launched lifeboats. The two lifeboats are an inshore inflatable D-class lifeboat (IB1), the Robert Ferguson, and an all-weather Mersey Class, the Inchcape.

== Notable people ==
In alphabetical order:

- Gus Alexander (1934–2010), footballer
- Marion Angus (1865–1946), poet, lived in Arbroath from 1876 until her father's death in 1902. Returned in 1945, a year before her death. Her ashes were scattered across Elliot Links.
- Neil Arnott (1788–1874) was born in Arbroath. He became physician-extraordinary to Queen Victoria and was the inventor of a prototype waterbed and warm air stove.
- James Barnet (1827-1904) born in Arbroath. Architect
- David Dunbar Buick (1854–1929), founder of Buick. Inventor of the enamelled bathtub and the overhead valve engine was born and baptised in the town.
- James Chalmers (1782–1853), Post Office reformer and disputed inventor of the adhesive postage stamp was born in the town.
- Dominik Diamond (born 1969), TV presenter
- Ned Doig (1866–1919), Arbroath-born goalkeeper. The only Arbroath F.C. footballer to win a Scotland cap while playing for the club.
- Martin Fair (born 1964), Moderator of the General Assembly of the Church of Scotland for 2020–2021 and minister at St Andrew's Parish Church, Arbroath.
- John Ritchie Findlay (1824–1898), proprietor of The Scotsman newspaper and philanthropist.
- Graham Gano (born 1987), American football placekicker for the Carolina Panthers and the New York Giants of the National Football League (NFL) was born in Arbroath and considers it his home town.
- James Glen Sivewright Gibson (1861–1951), architect, Arbroath born.
- Jamie Gillan (born 1997), American football punter for the New York Giants and the Cleveland Browns of the National Football League (NFL) was born in Arbroath.
- Robert Pearse Gillies (1789–1858), poet and writer, born near or at Arbroath.
- George Gordon (1829–1907), civil engineer working in the Netherlands, India and Australia was born in the town.
- Patrick Hennessy (1915–1980), Irish born, realist painter, educated and lived in Arbroath.
- Harry Lauder (1870–1950), Scottish singer and comedian. He lived in Arbroath until age of 14
- Durward Lely (1852–1944), opera singer, especially Gilbert and Sullivan. Arbroath born.
- Bernard of Kilwinning (died c. 1331), Abbot of Arbroath, Chancellor of Scotland and Bishop of the Isles. Widely credited since the 18th century as the author of the Declaration of Arbroath; Abbot at Arbroath Abbey from 1309 and immortalised in the town in a statue with Robert the Bruce holding aloft the Declaration sited at the West (or Cricket) Common.
- David Nicoll Lowe (1909–1999), botanist
- Isabella Macdonald Macdonald (1856–1947), physician
- James Mackay, 1st Earl of Inchcape (1852–1932), Chairman of P&O and the British India Steam Navigation Company was born in Arbroath.
- Megan McColl (born 2000), International cricketer, represented Scotland on at least 48 occasions. Born and grew up in Arbroath.
- Gareth Murray (born 1984), basketball player/coach of Glasgow Rocks, represented Great Britain at seven or more major tournaments. Grew up in Arbroath.
- Morris Pert (1947–2010), Scottish composer, percussionist, pianist and session musician, born in Arbroath.
- George Scott Railton (1849–1913), Scottish missionary, first commissioner of The Salvation Army and 2nd in Command to William Booth was born in Arbroath.
- Alexander Ross (1895–1972), born in Arbroath. Made one first-class appearance as wicket keeper and batsman for the Civil Service cricket team against New Zealand in 1927, scoring a single run over the two innings.
- Robert Sievwright (1882–1947), international cricketer for Scotland, born in Arbroath.
- David Frederick Skea (1871–1950), was a Scottish association football player (1890s).
- Andy Stewart, (1933–1993), musician and entertainer, lived in Arbroath as a boy and retired to Arbroath.
- Gavin Swankie (born 1983), Arbroath born footballer.
- Paul Tosh (born 1973), football striker was born and raised in Arbroath.

== See also ==
- Aber and Inver as place-name elements
- List of places in Angus
