= Church of St Mary the Virgin, Arbroath =

Church in Angus, Scotland

Coordinates: 56.5613°N 2.5757°W

St Mary the Virgin's Church, Arbroath
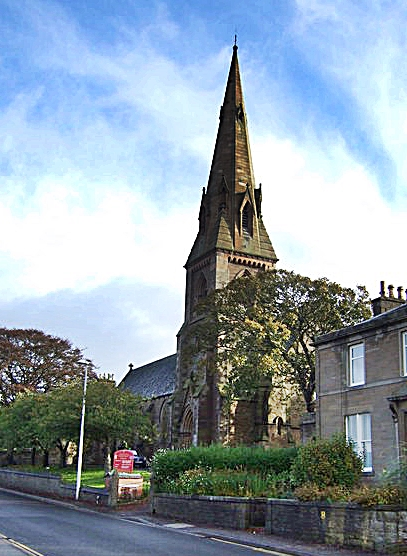
- St Mary the Virgin's Church, Arbroath
- Denomination: Scottish Episcopal Church
- Churchmanship: Central Episcopalian Tradition
- Website: http://www.stmarysarbroath.org.uk/

History
- Dedication: St Mary the Virgin

Administration
- Diocese: Brechin

Clergy
- Rector: Rev. Peter Mead

The Church of St Mary the Virgin is a Scottish Episcopal Church, in Arbroath, Angus, Scotland. It is part of the Diocese of Brechin.

== Church building ==
The church building in Springfield Terrace was erected in 1852–1854 to the designs of John Henderson of Edinburgh. Robert Lorimer contributed the chancel screen and panelling in 1927.

The church has a large oblong nave and north aisle with chancel and side chapel. The tower with lucarned spire is at the north-west of the nave and the spire is a prominent landmark on the skyline of the town. The materials are snecked masonry and slate. It became a Category B listed building in 1971. The rectory, also by Henderson, is separately listed as Category C.

The organ is by Blackett & Howden of Newcastle upon Tyne.

== History of the congregation ==
The Episcopalians were driven out of Arbroath parish church in 1694 and met in a series of meeting houses in the town. A Qualified congregation was formed about 1760. After the Episcopal and Qualified congregations joined in 1806 they worshipped in the former Qualified chapel, St Mary's which was sold in 1859 after the present church was built. The St Ninian's United Free Church (now disused) stands on the site of the earlier St Mary's.

== Records ==
Church records for St Mary's are at University of Dundee Archives among the Brechin Diocesan Library Manuscripts.

== See also ==
- St Andrew's Parish Church, Arbroath (Church of Scotland)
- St John's Methodist Church, Arbroath
