= Arbroath Town House =

Municipal Building in Arbroath, Scotland

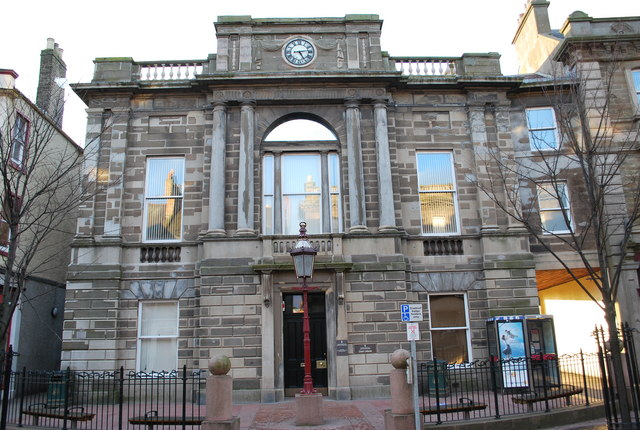
- Arbroath Town House

- Shown in Angus
- 56.5587°N 2.5818°W
- Location: High Street, Arbroath

History
- Built: 1808

Site notes
- Architect: David Logan
- Architectural style: Neoclassical style

Listed Building – Category B
- Official name: No. 88 High Street (Former Town House), Arbroath
- Designated: 11 October 1971
- Reference no.: LB21172

Arbroath Town House is a municipal building in the High Street, Arbroath, Scotland. The town house, which was the headquarters of Arbroath Burgh Council, is a Category B listed building.

== History ==
The first municipal building in the town was the tolbooth which was built on the east side of the High Street using stones from Arbroath Abbey in 1686. It was rebuilt, after becoming dilapidated, in 1779. In the early 19th century, in the context of the growing importance of the town as a coastal port, civic leaders decided to procure a town house for the royal burgh on the west side of the High Street.

Work started on the new building in 1803. It was designed by a local architect, David Logan, in the neoclassical style, built in ashlar stone and completed in 1808. It was altered and extended to the rear to a design by David Smith of Dundee in 1844. The design involved a symmetrical main frontage with three bays facing onto the High Street; the central bay, which slightly projected forward, featured a doorway flanked by brackets supporting a cornice; there was a tri-part round headed window on the first floor flanked by paired Doric order columns supporting a frieze containing carved rosettes with a parapet above containing a clock decorated with festoons. Internally, the principal rooms were the great hall, the town clerk's office and the burgh chamber which could also be used for court hearings. A new jail, a jailer's house and a police station were erected behind the town house and formed part of the complex. The magistrates held hearings once a week and cells were provided for holding prisoners. In 1900 the magistrates moved to No. 78 High Street allowing the whole of the building to be used for municipal purposes.

Following further population growth, largely related to the jute and sailcloth industries, the area became a large burgh with the town house as its headquarters in 1936. The building continued to serve as the headquarters of the burgh council, but ceased to be the local seat of government when the enlarged Angus District Council was formed in 1975. In 1977 the Scottish Courts and Tribunals Service decided that No. 78 High Street was no longer suitable for judicial use and moved back into the town house, converting the burgh chamber into a courtroom. In 2007 the significance of the town house was recognised by the European Union when it ruled that, for Arbroath smokies to have "protected status", they must be produced within "a coastal corridor with an inland boundary 8 kilometres radius from Arbroath Town House".

After all court hearings moved to Forfar in May 2014, the building closed as a courthouse. The Arbroath Court House Community Trust, which was formed at the time of the closure, acquired the building for a nominal sum in December 2020 and outlined its proposals for converting the building into a community hub in May 2021.

== See also ==
- List of listed buildings in Arbroath, Angus
