= Robert Sievwright =

Scottish cricketer

Cricket information
- Batting: Left-handed
- Bowling: Slow left-arm orthodox

Career statistics
Competition	First-class
Matches	13
Runs scored	98
Batting average	7.53
100s/50s	0/0
Top score	13*
Balls bowled	2,840
Wickets	65
Bowling average	19.96
5 wickets in innings	5
10 wickets in match	1
Best bowling	7/71
Catches/stumpings	2/0
- Source: CricketArchive

Robert Willis Sievwright (16 June 1882 – 12 July 1947) was a Scottish first-class cricketer from Angus.

A left arm orthodox bowler, Sievwright made his debut for Scotland against the touring South African national team in 1912 and took 6 wickets in the first innings. His following game came against Australia and he managed what would remain his career best figures of 7 for 71.

Sievwright played club cricket in Scotland for Arbroath United for whom he took 2242 wickets. He died on the pitch during a game against Perthshire after suffering a heart attack.
