= Love from a Stranger =

Love from a Stranger is the name of several works based on the short story Philomel Cottage written by Agatha Christie:

- Love from a Stranger (1936 play), written by Frank Vosper based on the short story
- Love from a Stranger (1937 film), a British film directed by Rowland V. Lee; released as A Night of Terror in the USA
- Love from a Stranger (1947 film), an American film directed by Richard Whorf; released as A Stranger Walked In in the United Kingdom
- Love from a Stranger (1938 TV play), a play directed by George More O'Ferrall starring Bernard Lee and Edna Best
- Love from a Stranger (1947 TV play), a play directed by George More O'Ferrall starring Joy Harington and Henry Oscar
