= Walter Fitzgerald =

English actor (1896–1976)

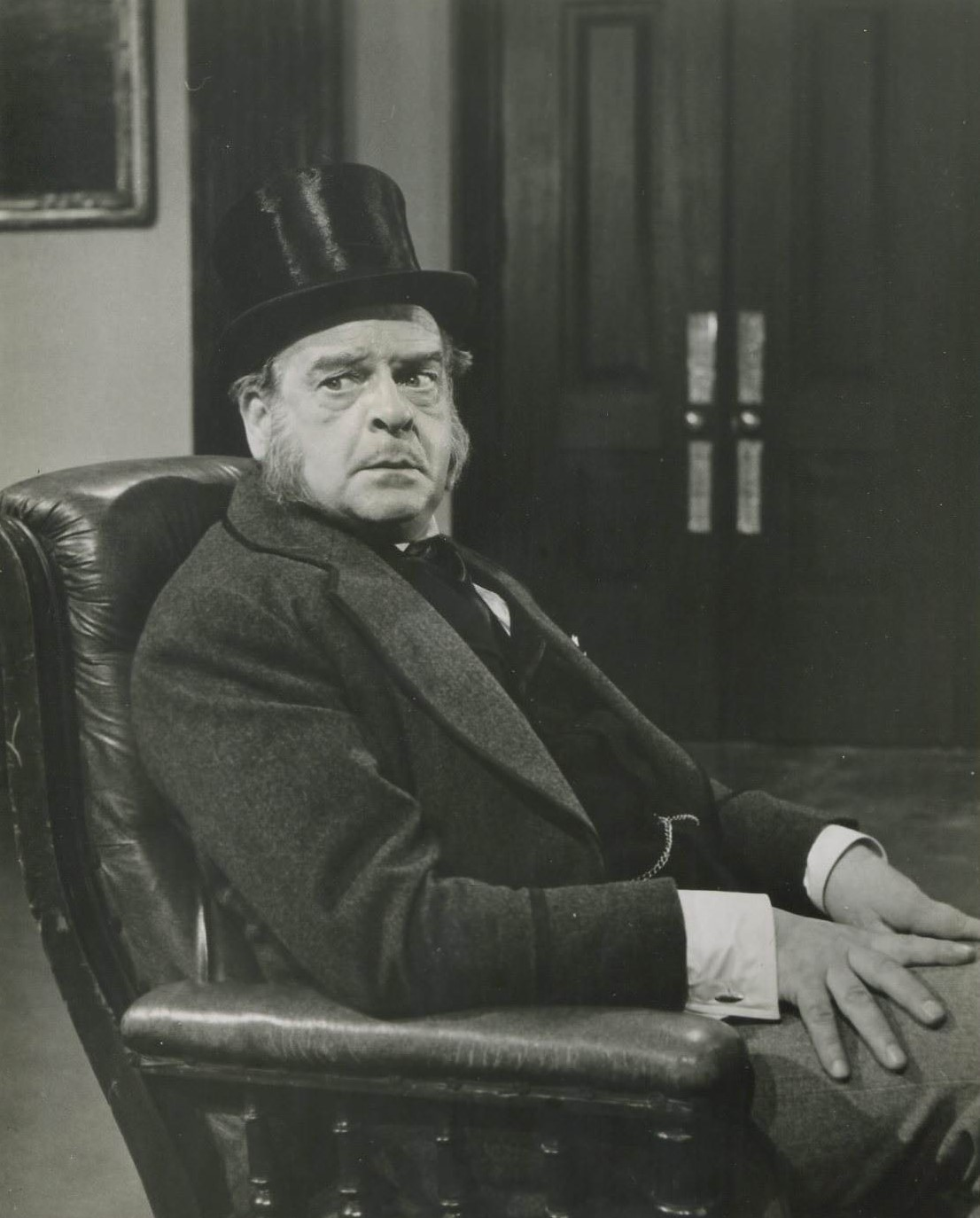
- Fitzgerald in Around The World in 80 Days (1956).
- Born: Walter Fitzgerald Bond; 18 May 1896; Stoke, Plymouth, Devon, England
- Died: 20 December 1976 (aged 80); Fulham, London, England
- Occupation: Actor
- Years active: 1922–1969
- Spouse(s): Rosalie Constance Grey (m. 1924; div. 19??) Angela Kirk (m. 1942; died 1970)
- Children: 5

Walter Fitzgerald Bond (18 May 1896 – 20 December 1976) was an English character actor.

== Early life ==
Born in Stoke, Plymouth, Fitzgerald was a former stockbroker before he began his theatrical training at RADA. He joined the British Army during World War I, serving with the Worcestershire Regiment, the Devonshire Regiment, and the Somerset Light Infantry.

== Career ==
Fitzgerald made his professional stage bow in 1922 and his first film appearance in 1930.

He toured with Sir John Martin-Harvey and Sir Seymour Hicks. He was understudy to Sir Gerald du Maurier (1928–29). Fitzgerald appeared in films from the 1930s, often in 'official' roles (policemen, doctors, lawyers). He appeared on British television in the 1950s and 1960s before his retirement. His best-remembered film roles include Simon Fury in Blanche Fury (1948), Dr. Fenton in The Fallen Idol (1948), and Squire Trelawney in Treasure Island (1950). In the opening scenes of H.M.S. Defiant (1962) he played the admiral who listens to – and then disregards – Captain Crawford's complaints about maritime cruelty.

== Personal life ==
He married Rosalie Constance Grey in 1924. They had one son, Michael Lewis Fitzgerald-Bond. His second marriage was to Angela Kirk in 1938, and they had three sons (Jonathan, Timothy, and Charles) and one daughter (Julia).

== Filmography ==
- Murder at Covent Garden (1932) – Donald Walpace
- The Show Goes On (1937) – Soldier with His Family on Troopship (uncredited)
- This England (1941) – Vicar
- In Which We Serve (1942) – Colonel Lumsden
- Squadron Leader X (1943) – Inspector Milne
- San Demetrio London (1943) – Chief Engineer Charles Pollard
- Strawberry Roan (1945) – Walter Morley
- Great Day (1945) – Bob Tyndale
- Mine Own Executioner (1947) – Dr. Norris Pile
- This Was a Woman (1948) – Arthur Russell
- Blanche Fury (1948) – Simon Fury
- The Fallen Idol (1948) – Dr. Fenton
- The Winslow Boy (1948) – First Lord
- The Small Back Room (1949) – Brine
- Edward, My Son (1949) – Mr. Kedner
- Treasure Island (1950) – Squire Trelawney
- Flesh and Blood (1951) – Dr. Cooper
- The Pickwick Papers (1952) – Mr. Wardle
- The Ringer (1952) – Commissioner
- The Net (1953) – Sir Charles Craddock
- Appointment in London (1953) – Mulvaney
- The Cruel Sea (1953) – Warden (uncredited)
- Twice Upon a Time (1953) – Professor Reynolds
- Personal Affair (1953) – Henry Vining
- Our Girl Friday (1953) – Captain
- Front Page Story (1954) – Black
- Lease of Life (1954) – The Dean
- The Cockleshell Heroes (1955) – Gestapo Comdt.
- Around The World in 80 Days (1956) – Club Member
- The Man in the Sky (1957) – Conway
- Something of Value (1957) – A White Settler – Henry McKenzie
- The Birthday Present (1957) – Sir John Dell
- The Camp on Blood Island (1958) – Cyril Beattie
- Darby O'Gill and the Little People (1959) – Lord Fitzpatrick
- Third Man on the Mountain (1959) – Herr Hempel
- H.M.S. Defiant (1962) – Admiral Jackson
- We Joined the Navy (1962) – Admiral Thomas
- Decision at Midnight (1963) – Prime Minister

== Selected stage roles ==
- Debonair by Frank Vosper (1930)
- Black Coffee by Agatha Christie (1931)
- Someone at the Door by Campbell Christie (1935)
- Poison Pen by Richard Llewellyn (1938)
- Death on the Table by Michael Pertwee (1938)
- The Duke in Darkness by Patrick Hamilton (1942)
- The Green Bay Tree by Mordaunt Shairp (1950)
