= Debonair =

Debonair or Debonaire may refer to:

- Debonair (airline), a British airline that operated from 1996 to 1999
- Debonair (magazine), an Indian men's magazine
- Debonair (play), a 1930 British play by Frank Vosper
- Beechcraft Debonair, a model variant of the Beechcraft Bonanza aircraft
- Mitsubishi Debonair, an automobile
- The Debonaires, the early name of The Flairs, an American doo wop group
- "Debonair", a song by The Afghan Whigs from the 1993 album Gentlemen
- Debonaire, a 2016 album by Ike Moriz
- "Debonaire", a song by Dope from the 1999 album Felons and Revolutionaries
- Debonairs Pizza, a South African based pizza restaurant chain

== See also ==
- Thangam Debbonaire (born 1966), British politician
- DevonAir, a former local radio station
