= The Listerdale Mystery =

1934 short story collection by Agatha Christie

- Dust-jacket illustration of the first UK edition
- Author: Agatha Christie
- Language: English
- Genre: Detective fiction Short stories
- Publisher: Collins Mystery
- Publication date: June 1934
- Publication place: United Kingdom
- Media type: Print (hardback & paperback)
- Pages: 256 pp (first edition, hardcover)
- Preceded by: Unfinished Portrait
- Followed by: Why Didn't They Ask Evans?

The Listerdale Mystery is a short story collection written by Agatha Christie and first published in the UK by William Collins and Sons in June 1934. The book retailed at seven shillings and sixpence (7/6). The collection did not appear in the US; however, all of the stories contained within it did appear in other collections only published there.

The collection is notable for the first book appearance of the story Philomel Cottage, which was turned into a highly successful play and two feature films, and was also televised twice in the UK.

== Plot summaries ==
=== The Listerdale Mystery ===
Mrs St. Vincent is a genteel lady living in reduced circumstances with her son and daughter, Rupert and Barbara. After her husband's financial speculations went wrong, he died, and they were forced to vacate the house, which had been in their family for generations. They now live in rooms in a boarding house (one which has seen better times). Therefore, they are unable to entertain people of similar class and upbringing. Rupert has just started a job in the city, with excellent prospects but, at this point in time, only a small income. Barbara enjoyed a trip to Egypt the previous winter with – and paid for by – a cousin. On this trip she met a young man called Jim Masterson, who is interested in courting her, but who would be put off if he saw their reduced circumstances.

Looking through the Morning Post, Mrs St. Vincent sees an advertisement for a house to let in Westminster, furnished, and with a nominal rent. Although she thinks she has little chance of being able to afford the house, she goes to see the house agents and then the house itself, and is instantly taken with it and pleasantly surprised at its very low rent. The agents offer her the house for a six-month rental. Barbara is delighted, but Rupert is suspicious – the house belonged to Lord Listerdale, who disappeared eighteen months previously and supposedly turned up in East Africa, supplying his cousin, Colonel Carfax, with power of attorney.

They take the house and are looked after in style by Quentin, the butler, whose wages are paid for by Lord Listerdale's estate, as are the wages of the two other servants. Delicious food regularly turns up on the table. It is sent up regularly from his Lordship's country seat of King's Cheviot – an old custom.

After three months, Mrs St. Vincent is very happy in the house and Jim has proposed to Barbara. Rupert still entertains his suspicions, and is somewhat convinced that Listerdale is not in Africa, but has perhaps been murdered, and his body hidden in the house. Rupert also suspects Quentin of being part of whatever plot has occurred. Rupert goes on a motorcycling holiday, which takes him near to King's Cheviot.

Spotting someone who resembles Quentin, he questions the man, who tells him he is really called Quentin; was butler to Lord Listerdale; but retired on a pension to an estate cottage some time before. Rupert brings the real butler to London and confronts the fake one. The real butler tells an astonished St Vincent family that the fake is in fact Lord Listerdale himself. His Lordship explains that, ashamed of his selfish life to date, he faked his relocation to Africa, and has since spent his time helping people like the St Vincents, whose lives have been reduced to something akin to begging. Over the past few months, he has fallen in love with Mrs St Vincent, and now proposes marriage to the delighted lady.

=== Philomel Cottage ===
Alix Martin is a woman in her mid-thirties who has worked as a shorthand typist for fifteen years. For most of that time she has had an understanding with a fellow clerk by the name of Dick Windyford; but, as both are short of funds and, at various times, had family dependants, romance and marriage have been out of the question and never spoken of. Two events happen suddenly: a distant cousin of Alix dies, leaving her enough money to generate an income of a couple of hundred pounds a year – however, her financial independence seems to annoy Dick – and, at much the same time, Alix meets a man, Gerald Martin, at a friend's house, and after a whirlwind romance they are engaged within a week and married soon after. Dick is furious, and warns Alix that she knows nothing whatsoever about her new husband.

A month after they are married, Gerald and Alix are living in the picturesque Philomel Cottage. It is isolated, but fitted with all modern conveniences. Alix has some anxieties: she has a recurring dream in which Gerald lies dead on the floor, Dick standing over him having committed the deed of murder, and Alix grateful for the act. She is troubled that the dream is a warning. By coincidence, Dick phones her. He is staying at a local inn and wishes to call on her. She puts him off, afraid of what Gerald's reaction might be.

After the call she chats to the gardener, George, and during the course of the conversation is told two strange things: Gerald has told George that Alix is going to London the next day, and that he does not know when she will be returning (although she knows nothing about this); and that the cost of the cottage was two thousand pounds. Gerald had told Alix that it was three thousand, and she gave him part of her inheritance to make up the difference. Alix finds Gerald's pocket diary dropped in the garden and looks through it, seeing her husband's meticulous entries for everything he does in his life. An appointment is marked down for 9:00 pm that night, but no indication is given as to what will happen at that time.

Alix suddenly has doubts about her husband, which only increase when he gives her a cryptic warning about prying into his past life. He is also furious that George made the comment about going to London. He claims the 9:00 pm entry was to remind him to develop photographs in his dark room, but he has now decided not to carry out this chore. The next day, driven by questions and insecurities, Alix starts to search through her husband's papers in two locked drawers, and in one of them finds newspaper clippings from America dated seven years previously which report on a swindler, bigamist and suspected murderer called LeMaitre. Although found not guilty of murder, he was imprisoned on other charges and escaped four years before.

Alix seems to recognise LeMaitre from the photographs – it is Gerald! He returns to the cottage, carrying a spade, supposedly to do work in the cellar, but Alix is convinced that he intends to kill her. Desperately keeping up a pretence of normality, she makes a supposed call to the butcher. It is in fact a coded call for help to Dick at the inn. Gerald tries to get her to join him in the cellar, but she plays for time, telling Gerald that she is in fact an unsuspected murderess who killed two previous husbands by poisoning them with hyoscine, which induces the symptoms of heart failure. Gerald had been complaining that his coffee was bitter, and he is convinced that she has now poisoned him. At that moment, Dick and a policeman arrive at the cottage as Alix runs out. The policeman investigates inside and reports that there is a man in a chair who is dead, looking as though he has had a bad fright.

=== The Girl in the Train ===
George Rowland is a mildly dissolute young man who is dependent on his rich uncle for both his keep and his job at the family's city firm. Annoyed with his nephew's late night carousing, his uncle sacks him. Annoyed in turn with his uncle, George makes plans to leave home. Abandoning ambitious plans to go to the colonies, George decides instead to travel by train from the London Waterloo station to a place he spots in an ABC guide called Rowland's Castle. He is sure that he will be welcomed with open arms by the feudal inhabitants. He is happily alone in the first class carriage when a girl jumps onto the train begging to be hidden. George chivalrously hides her under the train seat, before a moustached foreign man appears at the window and "demands" his niece back. George calls a platform guard who detains the foreign man, and the train departs.

The girl introduces herself as Elizabeth but tells George that she can't give him an explanation for her actions. At the next station, she gets off the train. While speaking to George through the window, she spots a man with a small dark beard further down the platform getting into the train and tells George to keep an eye on him and to guard safely a package that she hands to him.

George follows the bearded man down to Portsmouth, books into the same commercial hotel, and watches him carefully. He is aware that there is another, ginger-haired man carefully watching both of them. He follows the bearded man as he goes on a quick walk through the streets, which ends up taking them both back to their hotel with no sign of any assignation. George wonders if the bearded man has spotted that he is being watched. His suspicions grow further when the ginger-haired man returns to the hotel, also seemingly after a night's walk. His puzzlement increases when two foreign men call at the hotel and ask George (although calling him "Lord Rowland") where the Grand Duchess Anastasia of Catonia, a small Balkan state, has gone to. The younger of the two men grows violent but George is able to subdue him with a martial arts manoeuvre. The two men leave, uttering threats.

That night, George watches the black-bearded man as he secretes a small packet behind the skirting board in the bathroom. Returning to his own room, George finds that the package Elizabeth gave him is no longer under the pillow where he hid it. After breakfast, the package has returned to his room. Investigating its contents at last, George finds only a box with a wedding ring inside it. He hears from the chambermaid that she is unable to gain access to the black-bearded man's room and decides to gain access himself via a parapet outside the window. He deduces that the man escaped via the fire escape just before he hears a noise from inside the wardrobe. He investigates the source of the noise and is attacked from within by the ginger-haired man. The latter identifies himself as DI Jarrold of Scotland Yard.

The black-bearded man was called Mardenberg and was a foreign spy who secreted the plans of the Portsmouth Harbour defences behind the skirting board. His accomplice is a young girl, and George wonders if this could have been Elizabeth. He is on the train back to London when he reads of a secret wedding between the Grand Duchess Anastasia of Catonia and Lord Roland Gaigh. At the next station Elizabeth gets onto the train and explains events to George. She was acting as a decoy for Anastasia to throw the latter's uncle, who opposed the romance, off the scent, and the black-bearded man and the packet were simply a ruse to distract George, as he was so willing to be part of a mystery – another wedding ring could easily have been procured, and George's adventures with the spy were a remarkable coincidence.

George realises that Elizabeth is actually Lord Roland's sister. He proposes to her. His uncle will be delighted he is marrying into the aristocracy, and Elizabeth Gaigh's parents, with five daughters, will be delighted that she is marrying into money. She accepts.

=== Sing a Song of Sixpence ===
Sir Edward Palliser, KC, receives a visit in his Westminster house from a woman called Magdalen Vaughan whom he met on a boat trip some ten years previously. She begs him for help, as she is the great-niece of Lily Crabtree, an old woman who was murdered some three weeks ago. The victim was found dead in her downstairs room in her Chelsea house, her head crushed in by a paperweight, which had then been wiped clean. Magdelen was one of five people in the house at the time of the death. The others were Magdelen's brother (Matthew Vaughan), Mrs Crabtree's nephew and his wife (William and Emily), and a servant (Martha). All four of the family members in the house were supported financially by Miss Crabtree and all four inherit one quarter of her estate. The police have been unable to establish any concrete evidence against anyone in the house and the suspicion against them is telling on them all. Magdalen begs Sir Edward to investigate thereby keeping to a promise he made to her ten years before to help her in any way he could, should the need arise. He agrees to help.

From a meeting with Miss Crabtree's solicitor, Palliser discovers that the old lady always collected from the latter three hundred pounds in five pound notes, every quarter for the next three-months' household expenses. He goes to Chelsea and meets Magdalen's relatives and discovers the tensions that exist in house. Emily rowed with Miss Crabtree at lunch and retired to her room following afternoon tea with a headache pill. William also went to his room with his stamp collection. Magdalen was upstairs sewing. Matthew Vaughan refuses to speak with Sir Edward, claiming to be tired of the whole business.

Palliser speaks with Martha who was devoted to Miss Crabtree as she took her into service thirty years before after she had had an illegitimate baby. She confirms that she can hear the creak of the stairs when anyone comes downstairs – and no one did during the period in question. She reports that Matthew was in a downstairs room, typing a journalistic piece. She could constantly hear the keys of the typewriter. She confesses, however, that Miss Crabtree could have opened the door to anyone and she would not have heard from the kitchen – especially as Miss Crabtree's room faced the street and she would have seen anyone approaching the house.

In questioning her as to whether Miss Crabtree was expecting anyone, Martha relates her final conversation with Miss Crabtree, which includes trivial complaints about the household budget and the dishonesty of tradesmen. Miss Crabtree cited a supposedly bad sixpence she was given.

Palliser searches Miss Crabtree's bag with her personal belongings and money, but finds nothing of interest. He is on his way home when Matthew Vaughan stops him in the street to apologise for his behaviour. Sir Edward catches sight of a shop over his shoulder called "Four and Twenty Blackbirds" and runs back to the house to confront Martha. No sixpence was in Miss Crabtree's bag but a piece of poetry from an unemployed man was – Miss Crabtree must have taken this from a man calling begging and she gave him the missing sixpence in return. Martha confesses that the killer was a caller to the house – it was her illegitimate son, Ben, who has fled the country.

=== The Manhood of Edward Robinson ===
Edward Robinson is a young man firmly under the thumb of his fiancée, Maud, who does not wish to rush into marriage until his prospects and income improve. He is a romantic at heart who wishes he was masterful and rugged like the men he reads of in novels. Somewhat impetuous in nature, he enters a competition and wins the first prize of £500. He does not tell Maud of this, knowing that she will insist for the money to be wisely invested for the future. He instead uses it to buy a small two-seater car.

On Christmas Eve, on holiday from his work as a clerk, he goes for a drive into the country. Stopping off in the dark evening at the Devil's Punch Bowl, he gets out of his car to admire the view and takes a short walk. He returns to his vehicle and drives back to London but on the way, reaching into the door pocket for his muffler, he instead finds a diamond necklace. In shock, he realises that although it is the same model car as his, it is not the same car. By coincidence, he got into the wrong car after his walk and drove off. He returns to the Punch Bowl but his car has gone. Searching further, he finds a note in the car which he is driving. It gives instructions to meet someone at a local village at ten o'clock.

Edward keeps the assignation and meets a beautiful woman in evening dress and cloak who thinks he is someone called Gerald. He tells her that his name is Edward. She is not thrown by the mistake and in conversation reveals that 'Gerald's' brother is called Edward. She has not seen this Edward since she was six years old.' She gets in the car but realises quickly that Edward has only recently learnt to drive and takes the wheel herself.

She tells Edward a story about her and 'Jimmy' having successfully stolen the necklace from a rich lady called Agnes Larella. She drives him to a London townhouse where the butler arranges evening dress for him and the lady drives them onto Ritson's – the nightclub of the rich and famous. He drinks cocktails and dances with the lady. He discovers that she is Lady Noreen Elliot, a famous society debutante. The theft of the necklace was in fact an elaboration of a treasure hunt, the rule being that the 'stolen' item must be worn in public for one hour to claim the prize.

As Edward and Lady Noreen leave the nightclub, the real Gerald turns up in Edward's car. He also reveals Edward not to be the one Noreen thought he was. Edward hurriedly retrieves his car and is about to drive off, when Noreen begs him to 'be a sport' and give her the necklace so she can return it. He does so and receives a passionate kiss in return.

Edward arrives at Maud's home in Clapham the next day. He happily admits to the competition win and buying the car. He tells her that he means to marry her next month, despite her objections. Maud is much taken with her newly masterful fiancé and agrees.

=== Accident ===
In an English village, ex-Inspector Evans, late of the CID tells his friend, Captain Haydock (ex-Royal Navy), that he has recognised a local woman, Mrs Merrowdene, as being Mrs Anthony, a notorious woman who was charged and tried nine years previously with the murder of her husband by arsenic poisoning. She claimed that her husband was an arsenic-eater and that he took too much. Giving her the benefit of the doubt, the jury acquitted her; and, for the past six years, she has been the wife of a local elderly professor. After recognising her, Evans has carried out further investigations and found out that Mrs Merrowdene's stepfather died when he fell off a cliff path when walking with her one day. At that time, the stepfather had opposed the girl's relationship (she was eighteen at the time of this incident) with a young man. Evans is convinced this earlier death was not accidental and that Mrs Merrowdene is guilty of multiple murders.

Soon afterward, walking in the village, Evans meets and talks with Professor Merrowdene and finds out that he has just taken out a large insurance policy which will pay out to his wife should he die. Evans is more convinced than ever that Mrs Merrowdene is planning a third killing. He goes to the village fête where a fortuneteller foresees him being involved in a matter of 'life and death.' He meets Mrs Merrowdene at the fête and deliberately calls her Mrs Anthony, trying to provoke a reaction, but the lady remains composed. She invites Evans home for tea with her and her husband. Once there, she tells him they drink Chinese tea in bowls and then admonishes her husband for using the bowls for his chemical laboratory work, as it leaves a residue. Evans sees that she is about to poison her husband in front of him, using him as a witness.

When Merrowdene leaves the room, Evans insists that the lady drinks from the bowl she prepared for her husband. She hesitates and then pours the contents into a plant pot. Evans is satisfied that he has prevented the murder and warns Mrs Merrowdene that she must not continue her 'activities.' He then drinks his bowl, chokes and dies on the spot. Having declared his suspicions of the woman, Evans himself, and not her husband, was Mrs Merrowdene's victim.

It is mentioned toward the end of the story that Evans was the third man who had threatened to cross Mrs Merrowdene and separate her from the man she loved; this means that Professor Merrowdene is the man she loved when she was 18 and that the three men were: her stepfather, Mr Anthony (whom she presumably did not want to marry), and Evans. She then calls her husband, telling him there has been a terrible accident, to presumably be blamed on her husband's carelessness in using the bowls for his chemical laboratory work, as she made a point of mentioning earlier to her beloved husband.

=== Jane in Search of a Job ===
Jane Cleveland, a young woman of twenty-six, is in need of a job. Her financial position is precarious and she lives in a shabby boarding house. Browsing the Daily Leader jobs column, she finds nothing of note, but in the personal column she sees an advert for a young woman of her age, build and height who is a good mimic and can speak French. She goes to the address given and is one of many girls queuing up in answer to the advert. Getting through to the final six, she is interviewed by a foreign gentleman and told to go to Harridge's hotel and ask for Count Streptitch.

Presenting herself there as instructed, Jane is again interviewed by the Count and then introduced to an ugly middle-aged lady by the title of Princess Poporensky. They both declare her to be suitable. They ask Jane if she does not mind the prospect of danger, to which she answers that she does not. Finally, Jane is introduced to the Grand Duchess Pauline of Ostrava, exiled from her country after a Communist revolution. Jane is similar in looks and colouring to the Grand Duchess, although she is slightly shorter. It is explained to Jane that the Grand Duchess is the target of assassination attempts by the people who overthrew and slaughtered her family. They want Jane to act as a decoy for her during the next two weeks, when she is in Britain and has to attend several charitable events. Jane agrees and is given money to stay at the nearby Blitz hotel (under the assumed name of Miss Montresor of New York) and to buy a dress to wear when she is following the Grand Duchess to the events. During these events, they will swap dresses when they suspect that a kidnap or murder attempt is imminent. Jane suggests a bright red dress in contrast to the Grand Duchess's dress of choice for a charity bazaar at Orion House. The house is located 10 mi (16 km) outside London. Jane will wear high-heeled boots to cover up the difference in height.

Three days later, the bazaar is taking place. The main feature of it is that one-hundred society women will each donate one pearl, which will be auctioned the next day. The real Grand Duchess declares the bazaar open and meets the people there. When it is time to depart, she and Jane swap dresses in a side room. Jane leaves in the Duchess's place – news having reached them that the assassins will make an attempt on the journey back to Harridge's. Jane is travelling back with the Princess Poporensky, when the chauffeur takes them down a side road and down an unknown and secluded route. The chauffeur stops the car and holds up the two women with a pistol. They are at an empty house, which they are locked in. A short time later, bowls of soup are given to the two women, which Jane eats but the Princess refuses. Jane falls asleep suddenly.

The next day Jane wakes up. She is alone in the house and inexplicably back in her red dress. She finds a newspaper in the house, which states that the charity bazaar was held up by a girl in a red dress and three other men. They stole the pearls and got away. The girl in the red dress has been traced as staying at the Blitz hotel under the name of Miss Montresor of New York – Jane realises that she has been set up by a gang of jewel thieves. She hears someone in the garden and finds a young man coming round from having been knocked out. He and Jane swap stories and the young man reveals that he was at the bazaar and was puzzled when he saw the Grand Duchess enter a room in low-heeled shoes and exit in high-heeled ones. He followed her to the empty house and saw a second car arrive with three men and a woman in a red dress. Presently, this woman came out in the Duchess's dress and all except Jane seemed to have departed. When the young man went to investigate, someone knocked him out.

The duo suddenly become aware that another man is nearby and listening to them. He introduces himself as Detective-Inspector Farrell. He has overheard the stories that the two told, and all has become clear to him. He realises what really happened at the bazaar hold-up and that Jane is innocent. The young man reveals that having seen Jane at the bazaar, he has fallen in love with her.

=== A Fruitful Sunday ===
Dorothy Pratt, a housemaid, is enjoying a Sunday drive in a cheap old car with her young man, Edward Palgrove. They stop at a roadside fruit stall and buy a basket of fruit from the seller who tells them with a leer on his face that they are getting more than their money's worth. Stopping off near a stream, they sit by the road to eat the fruit and read in a discarded Sunday paper of the theft of a ruby necklace worth fifty thousand pounds. A moment later, they find such a necklace in the bottom of the basket! Edward is shocked and scared of the sight, seeing the possibility of arrest and imprisonment but Dorothy sees the possibility of a new and better life from selling the jewels to a 'fence'. Edward is shocked by the suggestion and demands that she hand them over which she reluctantly does.

The next day, Dorothy contacts Edward. She has come to her senses after a sleepless night and realises that they must hand the necklace back. On the way back from his office-clerk job that night, Edward reads the latest developments on the jewel robbery in the newspaper but it is another adjacent story, which catches his attention. He meets Dorothy that night and shows her the second story – it is about a successful advertising stunt in which one out of fifty baskets of fruit sold will contain an imitation necklace. To their mutual relief, they realise that they are not the possessors of the stolen necklace.

=== Mr. Eastwood's Adventure ===
Anthony Eastwood is suffering from writer's block with a commission from an editor. He has typed a title – "The Mystery of the Second Cucumber", hoping that it will give him some inspiration but to no avail. He suddenly receives a mysterious telephone call from a girl identifying herself as Carmen. She begs for his help to avoid being killed, gives him an address to go to and tells him the codeword is "cucumber".

Interested in this coincidence, he goes to the address given, which is a second-hand glass shop. Trying desperately to avoid buying anything expensive, he finally lets slip the word "cucumber". The old lady who runs the shop tells him to go upstairs. Once there he meets a beautiful young woman of foreign extraction. She praises the saints that Anthony has come to save her, but is worried that he has been followed to the shop and tells him not to underestimate "Boris", who is a fiend.

Suddenly the police arrive and arrest Anthony for the murder of Anna Rosenborg. They are calling him "Conrad Fleckman", Anthony is not too worried about this turn of events, because he knows that he can prove his identity. He begs for a moment alone with the girl and tells her the truth. He asks her to ring him at home later.

Once outside the shop, Anthony again tries to persuade the police of his innocence. The more senior of the two men – Detective-Inspector Verrall – seems interested in Anthony's story while his subordinate – Detective-Sergeant Carter – is more sceptical. Anthony persuades the two men to take him back to his flat, where the porter confirms his identity. Then the trio go up to his rooms. Leaving Carter to conduct a search of his rooms to finally establish the truth of his identity, Anthony pours a whisky for himself and Verrall.

Anthony hears the story of Conrad Fleckman. It goes back over ten years and involves the sale of a Spanish shawl from the impoverished family of a man called Don Fernando to Anna Rosenborg. After buying the shawl, she seemed to have large sums of money at hand. Fernando was stabbed to death shortly afterwards and eight attempts have been made to burgle Anna Rosenborg's house in the intervening years. A week ago, Fernando's daughter, Carmen Ferrarez, arrived in Britain and threatened Rosenberg over the "shawl of a thousand flowers". She has now disappeared after the murder. Conrad Fleckman is a man whose name appears on a note found in Ferrarez's rooms. Now Rosenborg has been found dead in Fleckman's rooms.

Verrall is called away by a call at the front door and Anthony ponders the story he has been told. After a while, he realises that all has gone quiet. He goes out of his rooms and the porter tells him that he helped the two men with the packing of his goods. Puzzled, Anthony investigates and finds that his valuable collection of enamelled ceramics has been taken. He calls the police, who tell him that the culprits sound like the Patterson gang. He has been the subject of an elaborate hoax to get into people's houses and distract them with wild stories while they are robbed. Anthony is annoyed until he realises that his writer's block is cured. He has a new title for his story – "The Mystery of the Spanish Shawl".

=== The Golden Ball ===
George Dundas is sacked from his job by his uncle, for taking too much time off work. He is accused of not grasping the "golden ball of opportunity". Walking through the City of London, he is stopped by a society girl, Mary Montresor, in her expensive touring car. While driving past Hyde Park Corner, she questions George as to whether or not he would like to marry her. Somewhat distracted by Mary's reckless driving, he has answered yes when he sees newspaper bills. They report that Mary is to marry the Duke of Edgehill. Mary does not seem interested in her commitment and suggests that they should drive into the country and find a place to live.

Going along with her, George agrees. Heading southwest they spot a house on the brow of a hill that Mary likes and go to investigate. Mary states that they will suggest to anyone that is there that they thought it belonged to a "Mrs Pardonstenger" to cover up their investigations. Peeping through the windows, they are approached by a butler. He does not seem surprised by the pseudonym Mary uses and asks them into the house.

Once inside they are quickly accosted by a man and a woman. The man produces a revolver and tells George and Mary to go upstairs at gunpoint. At the top of the stairs, George suddenly fights back and knocks the man out. George is all for tying the man up but Mary begs him to leave the house, which they do. George takes the revolver with him. Once in the car, he checks the gun and is astonished to find that it is not loaded.

Mary confesses that the house is hers and the situation they found themselves in was staged by her. This was a test for any prospective husband, to see how he would react instinctively to protect her from danger. All candidates so far have failed the test. The couple in the house were engaged by her for the purpose, the man being Rube Wallace, a film actor. As George has been proposed to and passed the test, he suggests getting a special licence for the wedding. Mary wants him to go down on bended knee, which George refuses to do. He tells her that it is degrading.

When they arrive in London he contrives to slip on a banana skin when he gets out of the car, thereby getting down on one knee. George enjoys going back to his uncle and telling him that he is going to marry a rich young society girl – he has grasped the golden ball!

=== The Rajah's Emerald ===
James Bond, a young man, is on holiday at a fashionable coastal resort with his young lady, Grace. They observe the proprieties of the age by staying in separate accommodation. He is staying in a cheap boarding house, while she has put herself up in the high-class Esplanade Hotel on the front. She has discovered that her friends are also staying in the hotel – Claud Sopworth and his three sisters. At almost every opportunity James is being treated in a fairly cavalier manner by Grace. Claud eventually suggests that they should all go bathing in the sea.

The Esplanade has its own changing huts on the beach, but James, as a non-resident, is not allowed to use them. He therefore has to leave his "friends" and use the public huts, all of which have long queues. He takes a chance and uses an unlocked private hut, which belongs to one of the large private villas in the resort. He leaves his clothes in the hut. After their sea-bathe, James changes back into his clothes which he left in the hut. He does not join Grace or the others for lunch, as he has taken offence at Grace's jibes at the cheap trousers he is wearing.

While eating in a dingy café, James is astounded to find a large emerald in his pocket. From reading stories in the resort's weekly paper, he has no doubt that it belongs to the Rajah of Maraputna, who is staying at Lord Edward Campion's private villa. The beach hut belongs to Lord Campion. James realises that when he changed out of his bathing clothes, he put on the wrong trousers. Leaving the café he sees newspaper bills stating that the Rajah's emerald has been stolen. Wondering why a priceless emerald was left in a beach hut in the first place, he goes back to the hut to change back into his own trousers.

James is suddenly stopped by a man who shows him his badge and identifies himself as Detective-Inspector Merrilees of Scotland Yard. He states that he is on the track of the emerald. James is arrested and claims that the emerald is at his lodging. The policeman is taking him back there, but on the way they pass a police station. James suddenly grabs the man and shouts for the police himself, claiming that Merrilees has picked his pocket. The police search Merrilees and find the emerald, which James secreted there. James is in turn accused by Merrilees but Lord Campion arrives and identifies Merrilees as Jones, his suspected valet.

James relates the whole story to Lord Campion, but intentionally omits a detail. James had recognised that the badge that "Merrilees" showed him was a badge for a cycling club. By coincidence, James is a member of the same club. As the Rajah wants to thank James personally, Lord Campion invites him to his villa for lunch. James is delighted to accept the invitation. He also enjoys the opportunity to turn down a half-hearted invitation from Grace and the Sopwith siblings. He points to Grace that Lord Campion's dressing style is similar to his own.

=== Swan Song ===
Madame Paula Nazorkoff, the famous but temperamental operatic soprano, is in London for a short series of appearances. Her manager, Mr Cowan, has arranged five appearances at Covent Garden as well as a single appearance at the Albert Hall and also a performance of Madame Butterfly at the private theatre in the castle home of Lord and Lady Rustonbury where royalty will be present. The name seems familiar to Madame Nazorkoff and she realises that she read of it in an illustrated magazine, which is still with her in her Ritz Hotel room. Scanning through it, she immediately becomes less scornful of the idea but insists that the performance be changed to Tosca. Mr Cowan hears her mutter, "At last, at last – after all these years".

Preparations on the day at the home of Lord Rustonbury are going well until Signor Roscari, due to sing the part of Scarpia, suddenly falls strangely ill. Lady Rustonbury remembers that a nearby neighbour is Edouard Bréon, the retired French baritone and she drives off to ask him to step in at the last moment. He agrees and returns. In the hall of the castle, Bréon reminisces over past performances of Tosca that he has heard. He states that the best one was over twenty years before, performed by a young girl called Bianca Capelli. She was foolish though, as she was in love with a man involved with the Camorra. She begged Bréon to use his influence to save his life, when her love interest was condemned to death. Bréon states he did nothing for the man, as he was not worth it. Following his execution, Capelli entered a convent. Blanche, the Rustonbury's daughter, watches Mr Cowan as Nazorkoff claims that as a Russian she is not so fickle.

The performance goes well and the invited audience are appreciative. The second act reaches its climax as the character of Tosca stabs Scarpia. After the curtain has fallen, a stagehand rushes out and a doctor is called for. Nazorkoff was apparently so involved with her performance that she really did stab Bréon. Blanche knows differently though and she tells how she has realised that Nazorkoff was in fact Capelli, who has waited years for her revenge on the man who let her lover die – the story of Tosca has come to life. As the police take Nazorkoff away, she quotes another line from opera – "La commedia è finita" ("The show is over").

== Literary significance and reception ==
The Times Literary Supplement of 5 July 1934 after introducing the title story, stated, "After a heavy meal of full-course detective stories these friandises melt sweetly – perhaps a shade too sweetly – on the tongue: but they are, without exception, the work of an experienced and artful cook, whose interest it is to please. And just as one accepts and swallows, without misgiving a green rose, knowing it to be sugar, so one can accept the improbabilities and the fantasy with which Mrs. Christie's stories are liberally sprinkled. The little kernel of mystery in each tale is just sufficient to intrigue the reader without bewildering him. Here is no Hercule's vein: indeed Poirot would find little worthy of his great gift of detection in these situations, where one knows from the start that everything will come delightfully right in the end."

The Scotsman of 14 June 1934 summarised its review by stating, "They are all good stories with plausible ideas neatly handled. A capital book for odd-half-hours."

Robert Barnard: "Most of the stories in this collection are 'jolly', rather than detection. The final story is a dreadfully obvious one based on Tosca. The two stories with detective interest are the often reprinted Philomel Cottage (good but rather novelettish in style), and the clever Accident".

== References to other works ==
- In Mr Eastwood's Adventure, Anthony Eastwood misquotes from the Rubaiyat of Omar Khayyam when he states "Tomorrow I may be Myself with Yesterday's ten thousand years". The quote should be for seven thousand years.
- In The Rajah's Emerald, James Bond quotes "Thanking heaven fasting, for a good man's love" from Act III, Scene 5 of As You Like It. The name of James Bond is pure coincidence to the famous literary secret agent, The Rajah's Emerald having first appeared in print twenty-seven years before the first Bond book, Casino Royale. Lord Edward Campion is a character in the Parade's End novels by Ford Madox Ford.
- In Swan Song, Paula Nazorkoff's final words, "La commedia è finita!" are taken from the opera Pagliacci. This opera is also referenced in The Face of Helen, a short story in the 1930 collection The Mysterious Mr. Quin.

== Film, TV or theatrical adaptations ==
=== Philomel Cottage ===
Philomel Cottage was, before the Second World War, the most successful short story written by Agatha Christie in terms of number of adaptations. A stage version by the author herself was not published in her lifetime, and is seldom performed.

==== Stage play and further adaptations ====
It was adapted as a highly successful West End stage play in 1936 by Frank Vosper called Love from a Stranger.

The stage adaptation was filmed twice, once in 1937 and once in 1947.

The stage adaptation was further adapted into two TV plays – one in 1938 and another in 1947. It was also later adapted into a TV movie version, starring Emrys Jones, which aired on BBC TV on 26 December 1958.

==== West German adaptations ====
The first known West German adaptation was titled Ein Fremder kam ins Haus and broadcast 26 June 1957. It was directed by Wilm ten Haaf, and starred Elfriede Kuzmany and Fritz Tillmann.

A further adaptation was produced by Hessischer Rundfunk for broadcast on West German television on 5 December 1967 under the title of Ein Fremder klopft an starring Gertrud Kückelmann and Heinz Bennent.

==== Radio adaptations ====
It was adapted three times for the American half-hour radio programme Suspense (CBS) under its original name Philomel Cottage, first airing on 29 July 1942, starring Alice Frost and Eric Dressler. This episode has apparently been lost. The second adaptation aired 7 October 1943, with Geraldine Fitzgerald as Alix Martin and Orson Welles as Gerald Martin. A third aired 26 December 1946, with Lilli Palmer as Alix Martin and Raymond E. Lewis as Gerald Martin.

Philomel Cottage was also adapted as a half-hour BBC Radio 4 play broadcast on Monday, 14 January 2002 at 11.30am. This was a modernised adaptation involving a dotcom company.

Adaptor: Mike Walker
Producer: Jeremy Mortimer

Cast:
Lizzy McInnerny as Alex
Tom Hollander as Terry
Adam Godley as Richard
Struan Rodger as Merlin

Music was by Nick Russell-Pavier.

=== Fireside Theatre ===
The story The Golden Ball was adapted as the first half of the episode "The Golden Ball / Just Three Words", broadcast on 17 January 1950, as part of the NBC anthology series Fireside Theatre.

=== The Agatha Christie Hour ===
Three stories of the stories in the collection, The Girl in the Train, Jane in Search of a Job and The Manhood of Edward Robinson were adapted by Thames Television in 1982 as part of its ten-part series The Agatha Christie Hour, a series of one-off plays from short stories by the writer.

=== Swan Song ===
Swan Song was adapted as a thirty-minute play featuring a lesbian relationship for BBC Radio 4 and broadcast at 11.30am on Monday 28 January 2002.

Adaptor: Mike Walker
Director: Ned Chaillet

Cast:
Maria Friedman as Polina
Emily Woof as Beth
Sylvester Morand as Bréon
Ray Lonnen as Dominik

== Publication history ==
- 1934, William Collins and Sons, June 1934, Hardcover, 256 pp
- 1961, Fontana Books (Imprint of HarperCollins), Paperback, 192 pp
- 1970, Pan Books, Paperback, 188 pp, ISBN 0-330-02504-X
- 1990, Ulverscroft Large-print Edition, Hardcover, ISBN 0-7089-2291-0
- 2010, HarperCollins; Facsimile edition, Hardcover: 256 pages, ISBN 978-0-00-735466-5

=== First publication of stories ===
The first UK publication details of all the stories contained in The Listerdale Mystery are as follows:

- The Listerdale Mystery: First published in issue 250 of The Grand Magazine in December 1925.
- Philomel Cottage: First published in issue 237 of The Grand Magazine in November 1924.
- The Girl in the Train: First published in issue 228 of The Grand Magazine in February 1924.
- Sing a Song of Sixpence: First published in Holly Leaves, the annual Christmas special of the Illustrated Sporting and Dramatic News in December 1929 with illustrations by C. Watson.
- The Manhood of Edward Robinson: First published in issue 238 of The Grand Magazine in December 1924.
- Accident: First published as The Uncrossed Path in the 22 September 1929 issue of the Sunday Dispatch with an uncredited illustration.
- Jane in Search of a Job: First published in issue 234 of The Grand Magazine in August 1924.
- A Fruitful Sunday: First published in the Daily Mail on 11 August 1928 with an uncredited illustration.
- Mr Eastwood's Adventure: First published as The Mystery of the Second Cucumber in issue 233 of The Novel Magazine in August 1924, with an illustration by Wilmot Lunt.
- The Golden Ball: First published as Playing the Innocent in the Daily Mail on 5 August 1929 with an illustration by Lowtham. The line early in the story where Ephraim Leadbetter tells his nephew that he has failed to grasp "the golden ball of opportunity" is missing from this version but the reference to the "Golden Ball" is intact at the end of the tale.
- The Rajah's Emerald: First published in issue 420 of the fortnightly Red Magazine on 30 July 1926, with an illustration by Jack M. Faulks.
- Swan Song: First published in issue 259 of The Grand Magazine in September 1926.

=== Publication of book collection ===
As with Parker Pyne Investigates, this collection did not appear under the usual imprint of the Collins Crime Club but instead appeared as part of the Collins Mystery series. Along with The Hound of Death, this makes The Listerdale Mystery one of only three major book publications of Christie's crime works not to appear under the Crime Club imprint in the UK between 1930 and 1979.

=== US book appearances of stories ===
The stories contained in The Listerdale Mystery appeared in the following US collections:

- The Witness for the Prosecution and Other Stories (1948) – Accident, Mr Eastwood's Adventure (under the revised title of The Mystery of the Spanish Shawl), Philomel Cottage and Sing a Song of Sixpence.
- The Golden Ball and Other Stories (1971) – The Listerdale Mystery, The Girl in the Train, The Manhood of Edward Robinson, Jane in Search of a Job, A Fruitful Sunday, The Golden Ball, The Rajah's Emerald, Swan Song
