= The Green Bay Tree =

1933 three-act drama written by Mordaunt Shairp

- Original language: English
- Written by: Mordaunt Shairp
- Genre: Drama
- Setting: Mr. Dulcimer's Mayfair flat, Mr. Owen's Camden Town house

Premiere
- Date: 25 January 1933
- Place: St Martin's Theatre; London

The Green Bay Tree is a 1933 three-act drama written by Mordaunt Shairp that explores a "half-suggested homosexual relationship" between a man and his protégé or, in the words of one critic "a rich hot-house sybarite" and someone "he adopted at a tender age and has reared in emasculating luxury". It was included in Burns Mantle's The Best Plays of 1933-1934.

The play premiered at St Martin's Theatre in London's West End on 25 January 1933 and had a highly successful run of 217 performances, closing on 19 August 1933. It was directed by Marguerite Rea and the cast included Hugh Williams (the author's stepson) as Julian, Catherine Lacey as Leonora, Frank Vosper as Mr. Dulcimer, Herbert Lomas as Mr. Owen and Henry Hewitt as Trump.

Its Broadway premiere was produced and staged by Jed Harris with scenic design by Robert Edmond Jones. The play was a hit, running for 166 performances from 20 October 1933 to March 1934 at the Cort Theatre. Laurence Olivier appeared as Julian, Jill Esmond as Leonora, James Dale as Mr. Dulcimer, O. P. Heggie as Mr Owen and Leo G. Carroll as Trump. It was Heggie's final Broadway role. Harris's direction was lauded for its subtlety. Decades later, Olivier described the play as "a wonderful piece of work... brilliantly done and sensationally successful". In the New York Times, Brooks Atkinson wrote: "When the curtain rings down after a long, tense evening, you feel that the entire story has been brilliantly and forcefully told.... The theater has unleashed one of its thunderbolts."

The play was also produced at the Northampton Repertory in England in March 1934 with Errol Flynn as Trump. In 1935, when Lillian Hellman's The Children's Hour was prohibited by the British censor, its producer, Alec L. Rea, was asked to compare it to The Green Bay Tree. He said:

The two plays cannot be compared, as The Green Bay Tree had not a word to which anyone could take offense, while The Children's Hour calls a spade a spade. As a matter of fact, many people saw nothing erotic in The Green Bay Tree. Even the author himself told me such a suggestion was not intended.

The play was revived in the West End at the Playhouse Theatre on 24 April 1950, directed by Anthony Pelissier. The cast included Jack Watling as Julian, Brenda Bruce as Leonora, Hugh Williams this time playing Mr. Dulcimer, Walter Fitzgerald as Mr. Owen and Henry Hewitt reprising his 1933 performance as Trump.

Its Broadway revival at the John Golden Theatre on 20 January 1951 ran for only 20 performances. It was directed by Shepard Traube (1907–1983) and the cast included Denholm Elliott as Julian, Anne Crawford as Leonora, Joseph Schildkraut as Mr. Dulcimer, Mercer McLeod as Mr. Owen and Francis Compton as Trump. Atkinson again praised it as a "thoroughly absorbing drama" but found the performance could not compare with the 1933 production in "craft and tone". He noted the production minimized the homosexual overtones: "You can read his association with his ward as an abnormal attraction but Mr. Schildkraut does not put it there. ... [He] has proved there it more than one way to play it and still preserve the horror and the tragedy."

The play was revived from 25 November to 21 December 2014 at Jermyn Street Theatre, directed by Tim Luscombe, with Christopher Leveaux as Julian, Poppy Drayton as Leonora, Richard Stirling as Mr. Dulcimer, Richard Heap as Mr. Owen and Alister Cameron as Trump. One American critic asked: "[O]ne wonders what audiences in 1933 made of The Green Bay Tree given that Mordaunt Shairp’s play ... is pretty hard to stomach even today." He also wrote that "The casual misogyny that gets voiced makes for pretty tough going".

== Unrelated ==
The play is not based on Louis Bromfield's 1924 novel The Green Bay Tree.
