= Mithra Malek =

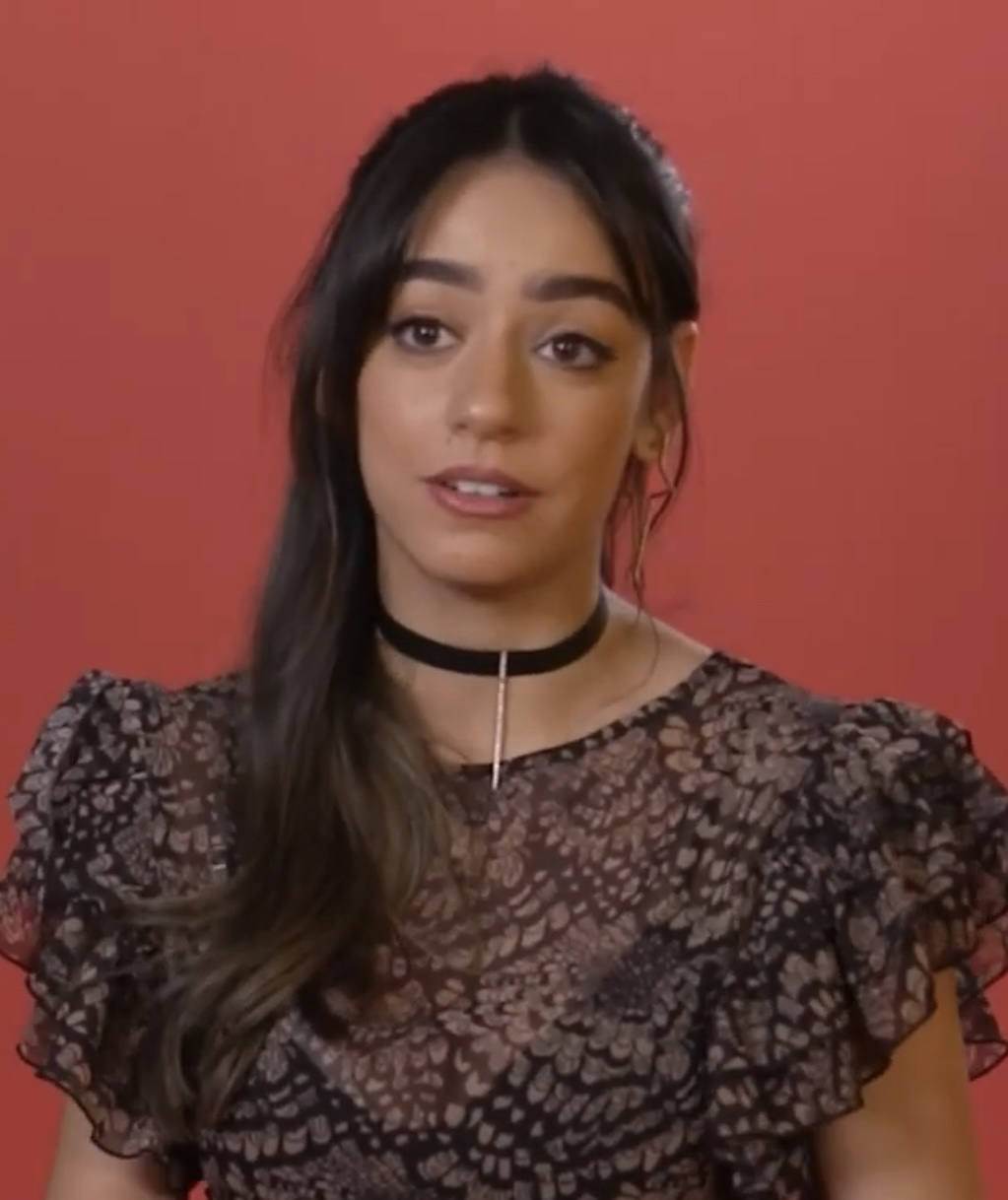
- Malek at the British Independent Film Awards 2021
- Born: Mithra Marie-Anne Malek; Westminster, London, England
- Other name: Missy Malek
- Education: Oxford University
- Occupations: Actress, filmmaker

Mithra Marie-Anne Malek, also known as Missy Malek, is a British actress, screenwriter, and director.

== Early life and education ==
Malek was raised in London and is of Middle Eastern descent. As a teenager, she joined the National Youth Theatre. Malek attended Queen's Gate School and graduated with a Bachelor of Arts (BA) in Philosophy from Oxford University. She also studied clowning under Philippe Gaulier.

== Career ==
=== Theatre ===
At the Theatre Royal Windsor in 2021, Malek appeared in Hamlet, with Sir Ian Mckellen in the title role, as Osric and understudied Ophelia, stepping into the role on multiple occasions. Malek then starred in Michael Chekhov's The Cherry Orchard in the lead role of Anya, opposite Sir Ian McKellen in the role of Firs. Rosemary Waugh of The i Paper highlighted Malek's performance, singling her and Mckellen out as "redeeming features" of the production, while The Stage praised her "subtlety". and Judi Herman of WhatsOnStage wrote "Malek, who made so much of the small role of Osric in Hamlet, shows an affecting depth as Ranevskaya's conflicted daughter". Writing for The Guardian, Michael Billington noted that Malek's Anya and Kezrena James's Varya "affectingly portray older and younger versions of Chekhov's female paradox."

In 2024, Malek served as the alternate for Rachel Zegler in the role of Juliet in Sam Gold's Broadway production of Romeo and Juliet (billed as R + J) at the Circle in the Square Theatre, performing opposite Kit Connor.

Malek played the lead role of T in the world premiere of The Meat Kings Inc. of Brooklyn Heights at London's Park Theatre in late 2025. Malek was described as a "revelation" by Theatre Weekly and "a standout" for her "slowly unbending hardness" by Nick Curtis of the Evening Standard. Patrick Marmion of the Daily Mail described Malek as "an exciting prospect", writing that as T, "she can turn on a dime — childlike and panicky one minute, dishing out verbal roastings the next."

In 2026, Malek played the title role in a contemporary staging of the Greek tragedy Iphigenia at the Arcola Theatre, opposite Simon Kunz and Indra Ove. Nick Curtis of the Evening Standard described her performance: "Malek emerges from the audience, a potent, dark eyed presence... Speaking with measured emphasis, she passes from joy to despair to acceptance, weeping hot tears on the way". He noted "her performance is as arresting as the one she gave in the wildly different role as an ex-con butcher in The Meat Kings Inc. Of Brooklyn Heights".

=== Television and film ===
In 2022, Malek appeared in the Netflix legal drama Anatomy of a Scandal. She starred in the 2024 film Party People opposite Matthew Daddario.

As a filmmaker, Malek wrote, directed, and acted in the short film Laughing Branches starring herself, Tom Hanson, and Leo Suter. Laughing Branches screened at international film festivals in 2017 and 2018 and picked up a number of accolades. Her second short film Tala premiered at the 2019 Santa Barbara International Film Festival.

Malek directed and wrote her third short We're Too Good For This based on a true story. The short film opened at the 2021 BFI London Film Festival. Malek was selected as a 2024 fellow for the Sundance Screenwriters Lab.

== Filmography ==
Year	Title	Role	Notes
2015	Anti-Social	Fashion PR Girl	
2016	Now You See Me 2	Case Assistant	
2017	Laughing Branches	Alex Page	Short film; director, writer, producer
2019	Tala,	Tala	Short film; director, writer, executive producer
2021	We're Too Good for This	—N/a	Short film; director, writer
2022	Anatomy of a Scandal	Nikita	Miniseries; 5 episodes
2024	Party People	Dana	Also known as Party O'Clock

== Stage ==
Year	Title	Role	Notes
2020	Love from a Stranger	Mavis Wilson	Theatre Royal Windsor
2021	Hamlet	Osric	Theatre Royal Windsor
2021	The Cherry Orchard	Anya	Theatre Royal Windsor
2024	Romeo + Juliet	Juliet Alternate	Circle in the Square Theatre, New York
2025	The Meat Kings! (Inc.) of Brooklyn Heights	T	Park Theatre, London
2026	Iphigenia	Iphigenia	Arcola Theatre, London
