= Norah Howard =

British actress (1900–1968)

- Norah Howard 1939 Spotlight photo by Houston Rogers
- Born: Norah Lillian Emily Smed; 12 December 1900; Fulham, London, England, UK
- Died: 2 May 1968 (aged 67); New York City, New York, USA
- Occupation(s): Stage and screen actress

Norah Howard (12 December 1900 – 2 May 1968) was a British actress of stage and screen.

== Biography ==
She was born as Norah Lillian Emily Smeed on 12 December 1900, in Fulham, London, England, her father was Alfred Howard Smeed. She changed her stage name from Smeed to Howard, adopting her father's middle name. Her theatre work included the original West End productions of Cole Porter's Nymph Errant and Frank Vosper's Love from a Stranger (1936); and on Broadway, the revival of Noël Coward's Tonight at 8.30 (1948). Norah died on 2 May 1968 in New York, New York, USA.

== Selected filmography ==
- The W Plan (1930)
- A Cuckoo in the Nest (1933)
- Love, Life and Laughter (1934)
- Car of Dreams (1935)
- Fighting Stock (1935)
- The Big Noise (1936)
- I've Got a Horse (1938)
- Star of the Circus (1938)
- The Saint in London (1939)
- The Lambeth Walk (1939)
- An Englishman's Home (1940)
- Two Loves (1961)
