= Lobsters (film) =

1936 documentary film

- Directed by: John Mathias, László Moholy-Nagy
- Starring: Alan Howland
- Edited by: László Moholy-Nagy
- Music by: Arthur Benjamin
- Distributed by: ABFD
- Release date: 1936
- Running time: 17 minutes
- Country: United Kingdom
- Language: English

Lobsters is a British documentary film made in 1935 and released in 1936 about lobster fishermen in the port of Littlehampton in Sussex, England and is one of the first aquatic films ever made. Hungarian-born László Moholy-Nagy spent several weeks getting to know the fishermen and their families, which had a long history of fishing for lobsters. Moholy Nagy also got to know the local community and listened to their dialect.
