= Queen's Gate School =

Location
- 131-133 Queen's Gate; London, SW7 5LE; England; 51°29′41″N 0°10′43″W

Information
- Type: Private day school
- Established: 1891; 135 years ago
- Local authority: Kensington and Chelsea
- Department for Education URN: 100511 Tables
- Chair of governors: Reica Gray
- Principal: Mrs Lydia Kyle
- Gender: Girls
- Age: 4 to 18
- Enrolment: 538 as of September 2019
- Website: Queen's Gate

Queen's Gate School is a private day school for girls aged 4–18 in Queen's Gate, South Kensington, London, England.

The Good Schools Guide described it as a "Charming popular school, with a mixed intake, which does jolly well by its girls." It is one of a handful of independent girls' schools in the country that does not have a prescribed uniform but girls are expected to abide by a strict dress code.

== History ==
Queen's Gate School was founded in 1891 by Eleanor Beatrice Wyatt (who later founded Heathfield School, Ascot) in her parents' home in nearby Stanhope Gardens. The following year, the School moved to 132 Queen's Gate, later expanding into the adjacent houses at 131 and 133. In May 2005, the school acquired 125/126 Queen's Gate and refurbished it as accommodation for Junior School pupils.

It celebrated its 120th anniversary in 2011, and a special service was held at the local parish church, St Augustine's, Queen's Gate.

Several notable figures have passed through their halls, among both the student body and teaching staff. The former Director-General of MI5 (2002-2007), Baroness Manningham-Buller, taught at Queen's Gate for three years before joining the secret service. The novelist Penelope Mary Fitzgerald, winner of the 1979 Booker Prize, also taught at the school in the 1960's, while Queen Camilla (then Camilla Shand) was a student.

== Academics ==
It has a strong academic track record in examinations. In 2011, it placed in the top 100 independent schools nationally for the GCSEs.

The school placed within the top 1.5% of schools nationally for 'value added' in 2026, indicating that students consistently outperform their baseline potential in GCSE and A-Level. 73% of GCSE students achieved A*- A grades. They have a strong Art and Design offering, regularly sending school leavers to leading Arts education institutions, including Parson's School of Art in New York.

== Notable alumnae ==
- Queen Camilla
- Lily Clempson, fashion designer
- Susannah Constantine, fashion designer and author
- Angela Delevingne, socialite
- Bryony Gordon, journalist
- Lulu Guinness, accessories fashion designer
- Belinda Harris-Reid, knit-wear designer and promoter of hand-knitting
- Harriet Hillier, GB fencer
- Lucinda Lambton, photographer and broadcaster
- Emma McQuiston, fashion model
- Nigella Lawson, food writer and television presenter
- Mithra Malek, actress and filmmaker
- Imogen Poots, actress
- Issy van Randwyck, singer
- Vanessa Redgrave, actress, socialist and activist
- Twinkle, singer
- Samantha Robinson, actress
- Sophia Swire, business woman
- Tilda Swinton, actress
- Coco Warner Allen, artist
- Trinny Woodall, fashion designer
- Anya Taylor-Joy, actress
