= The Big Noise (1936 British film) =

1936 British film by Alex Bryce

- Alastair Sim in a scene from the film
- Directed by: Alex Bryce
- Written by: Gerard Fairlie; Gene Markey; Harry Ruskin
- Produced by: John Findlay
- Starring: Alastair Sim; Norah Howard; Fred Duprez
- Cinematography: Stanley Grant
- Music by: Colin Wark
- Production company: Fox Film Company
- Distributed by: Fox Film Company
- Release date: 1936
- Running time: 65 minutes
- Country: United Kingdom
- Language: English

The Big Noise is a 1936 British musical comedy film directed by Alex Bryce and starring Alastair Sim, Norah Howard and Fred Duprez. It was written byGerard Fairlie, Gene Markey and Harry Ruskin, and was a quota quickie made at Wembley Studios by the Hollywood studio Fox's British subsidiary.

== Preservation status ==
The British Film Institute National Archive holds ephemera but no film or video materials.

== Synopsis ==
A clerk in an oil company is promoted in order to make him the fall guy for a series of illegal transactions that have brought it to the brink of ruin, but instead manages to turn the business around.

== Cast ==
- Alastair Sim as Finny
- Norah Howard as Mary Miller
- Fred Duprez as Henry Hadley
- Grizelda Harvey as Consuelo
- C. Denier Warren as E. Pinkerton Gale
- Viola Compton as Mrs. Dayton
- Peter Popp as Jenkins
- Howard Douglas as Gluckstein
- Reginald Forsyth as orchestra leader
- Edie Martin as old lady

== Reception ==
Kine Weekly wrote: "Slight comedy of big business rather thin in humour, and lacking the necessary polish and punch to make it really effective. ... Alastair Sim has his funny moments, but he is apt to 'mug' overmuch and exaggerate the character to too farcical a pitch. ... Straighiforward production involving a great deal of talk, but not much action. The characters are rather sketchily drawn, and there is not enough polish or pep to get over the essentials of the humorous situations."

The Daily Film Renter wrote: "Farcical story of nit-wit employee appointed figurehead president of crooked oil concern. Presented on straightforward lines with fair lashings of comedy and a couple of song numbers. Staged almost entirely in big City office, film has occasional good moments, but is inclined to drag. There are one or two amusing situations, but these are invariably offset by tedious sequences. The acting generally is suitable to the story's demands. Alastair Sim adequately suggests the nincompoop he is supposed to be."

Picturegoer wrote: "Alastair Sim, as Finny, is amusing at times, but he tends to strike too farcical a note, and often exaggerates the character beyond the bounds of possibility."

Picture Show wrote: "It Is straightforwardly directed, but the comedy situations are a little gparsely distributed and not enough got out of them."
