= Love from a Stranger (1947 TV play) =

- Based on: Love from a Stranger by Frank Vosper
- Directed by: George More O'Ferrall
- Country of origin: United Kingdom

Original release
- Release: 25 May 1947

Love from a Stranger is the name of two live BBC Television plays directed by George More O'Ferrall. The plays are based on the 1936 stage play of the same name by Frank Vosper. In turn, the play was based on the short story "Philomel Cottage", written by Agatha Christie.

The plays were only broadcast in the London area as this was the only part of the UK that could receive television transmissions at this time; recordings do not exist.

The 1947 version of the Vosper's play was transmitted on Sunday, 25 May 1947, just as the first, live from Alexandra Palace, at 8.45pm in a 75-minute broadcast. The performers in this version were Joy Harington and Henry Oscar. The play was broadcast again two days later when the cast and crew repeated their Sunday performance at 3.00pm on Tuesday, 27 May. Three days later BBC Radio broadcast Three Blind Mice which was later turned into a short story and in 1952 opened as The Mousetrap, the longest-running play in stage history.

== Main cast ==
- Joy Harington played Cecily Harrington
- Henry Oscar played Bruce Lovell
- Arthur Wontner played Dr Gribble
- Elizabeth Kirkby played Mavis Wilson
- William Roderick played Nigel Lawrence
- Edna Morris played Louise Garrard
- Sam Lysons played Hodgson, the gardener

== See also ==
- Love from a Stranger (1938 TV play)
