= The Crime at Blossoms =

1933 British film by Maclean Rogers

- Frame from the film
- Directed by: Maclean Rogers
- Written by: Mordaunt Shairp
- Based on: play The Crime at Blossoms by Mordaunt Shairp
- Produced by: Henry Edwards
- Starring: Hugh Wakefield; Joyce Bland; Eileen Munro
- Cinematography: Walter J. Harvey
- Production company: British & Dominions Film Corporation
- Distributed by: Paramount British Pictures (UK)
- Release date: March 1933 (UK)
- Running time: 78 minutes
- Country: United Kingdom
- Language: English

The Crime at Blossoms is a 1933 British "quota quickie" crime film directed by Maclean Rogers and starring Hugh Wakefield and Joyce Bland." It was written by Mordaunt Shairp based on his 1932 play of the same title. It was remade by Rogers in 1949 as Dark Secret.

== Preservation status ==
The British Film Institute National Archive holds a collection of ephemera and stills but no film or video materials.

== Plot ==
After moving into a picturesque country cottage, a woman becomes increasingly concerned about the fate of the previous owner who she believes was murdered.

== Cast ==
- Hugh Wakefield as Chris Merryman
- Joyce Bland as Valerie Merryman
- Eileen Munro as Mrs. Woodman
- Ivor Barnard as a late visitor
- Frederick Lloyd as George Merryman
- Iris Baker as Lena Denny
- Arthur Stratton as Mr. Woodman
- Maud Gill as Mrs. Merryman
- Wally Patch as Palmer
- Barbara Gott as fat lady
- Moore Marriott as driver
- George Ridgwell as process-server

== Critical reception ==
Kine Weekly wrote: "The novel entertainment lies mainly in the dialogue, but the construction of the play shows ingenuity and intelligence, and the characterisation is of interest."

The Daily Film Renter wrote: "Early action tedious, and dialogue often incredibly banal. Theme deals with exploitation of murder mystery, but action is strangely scattered. Acting poor except for type players, and one good passage by Joyce Bland. May prove acceptable among not too critical patrons."

TV Guide called it an "Okay crime melodrama."
