= Murder on the Second Floor =

1932 film

- Theatrical release poster
- Directed by: William C. McGann
- Written by: Roland Pertwee; Challis Sanderson
- Based on: play by Frank Vosper
- Produced by: Irving Asher
- Starring: Pat Paterson; John Longden; Sydney Fairbrother
- Cinematography: Willard Van Enger
- Production company: Warner Brothers-First National Productions
- Distributed by: Warner Brothers (UK)
- Release date: January 1932 (UK)
- Running time: 68 minutes
- Country: United Kingdom
- Language: English

Murder on the Second Floor is a 1932 British thriller film directed by William C. McGann and starring Pat Paterson, John Longden and Sydney Fairbrother. It was written by Roland Pertwee and Challis Sanderson based on the 1929 play of the same name by Frank Vosper. Warner Brothers later remade it in Hollywood as Shadows on the Stairs (1941).

== Plot ==
When commercial traveller Joseph Reynolds is found murdered, suspicion falls on Lucy, the maid in his boarding-house, who is found dead in a cupboard – an apparent suicide. But young playwright Hugh Bromilow, who also lives in the house, believes that Lucy is innocent, and decides to investigate. He identifies the landlady's husband as the murderer. But there is a twist.

== Cast ==
- John Longden as Hugh Bromilow
- Pat Paterson as Sylvia Armitage
- Sydney Fairbrother as Miss Snell
- Ben Field as Mr. Armitage
- Florence Desmond as Lucy
- Franklyn Bellamy as Joseph Reynolds
- John Turnbull as Inspector

== Reception ==
Kine Weekly wrote: "The fantastic story is written with skill and showmanship, and all the intriguing qualities are brought to the fore by good team work and competent direction. ... The story, when one gets down to fundamentals, is wildly incredible, but the ingenious manner of presenting it disarms criticism on this score. In fact, it is its fantastic qualities which furnish the unexpected, without which this type of entertainment is incomplete. There are so many twists, thrills and surprises that the interest is always held, and there is no time to dwell upon the improbabilities."

Film Weekly wrote: "Unhappily, the director has failed to catch the atmosphere essential to the drama, or to interpret the author's idea, and he is hindered rather than helped most of his players. Sydney Fairbrother, the only really capable member of the cast, saves the situation occasionally by her delightful comedy touches in the role of an elderly maiden lady... Murder on the Second Floor is a good film gone wrong in the making."

Picture Show wrote: "No little credit for the thoroughly entertaining hour the film provides is due to the all-round excellence of the cast. Sydney Fairbrother, as a 'refaned' and acid spinster, provides the delightful comedy moments, John Longden, as the young author, acts with restraint and sincerity, Pat Paterson, Florence Desmond, as the Cockney servant, Ben Field and others, do sound work. Photography and recording are well above the average."
