= Reginald Foresythe =

British musician (1907–1958)

Reginald Charles Foresythe (28 May 1907 – 28 December 1958) was a British jazz pianist, arranger, composer, and bandleader.

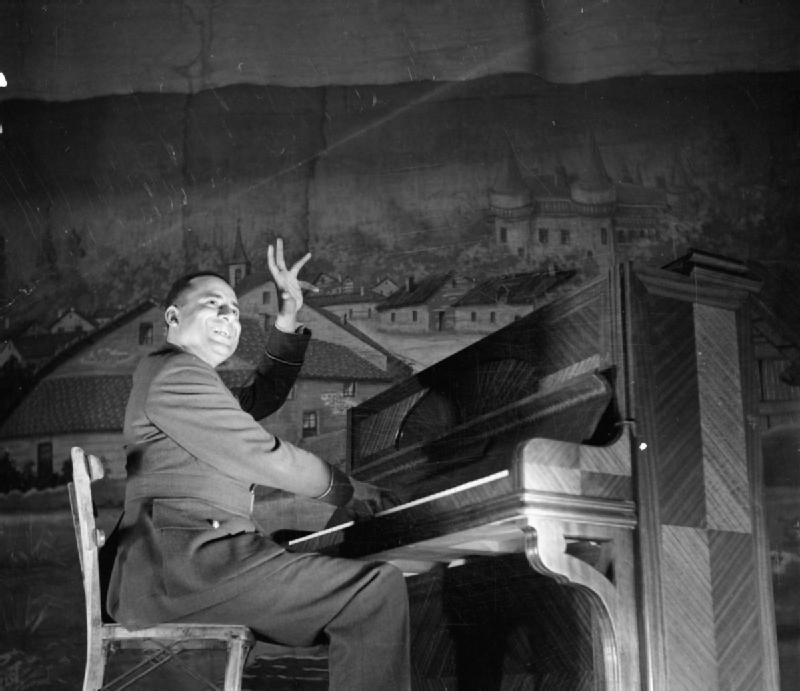
Foresythe entertains members of the RAF at the piano during a performance of the Services variety show Entertainment Pie, at Setif, Algeria during WWII, 1943

== Early life ==
Foresythe was born and died in London. His father was a West African barrister of Sierra Leone Creole descent and his mother was an Englishwoman of German descent. The Foresythe family descended from Charles Foresythe, a Sierra Leonean colonial official who settled in Lagos, Nigeria, in the 1860s. Charles Foresythe was born in the early nineteenth century to a European army captain and a mother from Tasso Island, Sierra Leone.

== Career ==
Foresythe played piano from the age of eight. He worked in the second half of the 1920s as a pianist and accordionist in dance bands in Paris, Australia, Hawaii, and California. He also wrote music for films by D. W. Griffith and played in Paul Howard's Quality Serenaders. In 1930, Foresythe moved to Chicago, Illinois, United States.

In America, he wrote arrangements for Earl Hines and music for Paul Whiteman. Hines made one of his songs, "Deep Forest", a part of his repertory, while Louis Armstrong, Fats Waller, Adrian Rollini, and Hal Kemp recorded Foresythe's compositions. He worked in New York City in 1934–35, arranging for Whiteman and recording with Benny Goodman, John Kirby, and Gene Krupa.

In London, Foresythe assembled a studio recording group called "The New Music of Reginald Foresythe". Between 1933 and 1936, he recorded for British Columbia and Decca, usually spotlighting his jazzy tone poems. Among the more well known were "Serenade to a Wealthy Widow", "Garden of Weed", "Dodging a Divorcee", and "Revolt of the Yes-Men". His recordings featured reeds and sax, but no horns. In January 1935, Foresythe assembled a one-off session in New York which featured Benny Goodman and Gene Krupa recording four of his compositions. Foresythe also recorded a number of piano solos and piano duets with Arthur Young (which included at least three medleys and four arrangements of "St. Louis Blues", "Tiger Rag", "Solitude" and "Mood Indigo" for His Master's Voice in 1938).

He served in the Royal Air Force during World War II, then accompanied vocalists and played solo piano in London in the 1950s.

Foresythe collaborated with songwriters Andy Razaf and Ted Weems, composing "Be Ready" (with both), "Please Don't Talk About My Man" (with Razaf), and "He's a Son of the South" (with Razaf and Paul Denniker). Foresythe died, following a fall downstairs, in relative obscurity, in 1958, aged 51.

== Personal life ==
Foresythe was gay, and was known to regularly get into fights in gay clubs and bars.

Following the war, Forsythe was diagnosed with "war nerves", what is today known as PTSD. A decade on from his heyday, his confidence shot, Foresythe became a full-blown alcoholic and spent the late 1940s and 50s playing clubs in Britain.

== Discography ==
All issues as The New Music of Reginald Foresythe unless otherwise indicated

London, 14 October 1933:

- "Serenade to a Wealthy Widow" (UK Columbia CB-675, US Columbia 2916-D)
- "Angry Jungle" (UK Columbia CB-675, US Columbia 2916-D)
- "Tea for Two" (rejected)

London, 1933 (date unknown) Reginald Foresythe, piano solo:

- "Caemembert" (UK Columbia DB-1244, US Columbia 3088-D)
- "Chromolithograph" (UK Columbia DB-1244, US no issue)

London, 9 February 1934:

- "The Duke Insists" (UK Columbia CB-764, US Columbia 3000-D)
- "Berceuse for an Unwanted Child" (UK Columbia CB-726, US no issue)
- "Garden of Weed" (UK Columbia CB-726, US Columbia 3000-D)
- "Bit" (UK Columbia CB-744, US no issue)

London, 1934 (date unknown) Reginald Foresythe and Arthur Young, piano duet:

- "St. Louis Blues" (UK Columbia DB-1407, US Columbia 3088-D)
- "Because It's Love" (UK Columbia DB-1407, US no issue)

London, 6 September 1934

- "Deep Forest" (UK Columbia FB-1643, US Columbia 139-M)
- "Lament for Congo" (UK Columbia FB-1643, US Columbia 139-M)
- "Volcanic" (Eruption For Orchestra) (UK Columbia CB-787, US no issue)
- "The Autocrat Before Breakfast" (UK Columbia CB-787, US no issue)

New York, 23 January 1935

- "The Melancholy Clown" (UK Columbia FB-1233, US Columbia 3060-D)
- "Lullaby" (UK Columbia FB-1031, US Columbia 3012-D)
- "The Greener The Grass" (UK Columbia FB-1233, US Columbia 3060-D)
- "Dodging a Divorcee" (UK Columbia FB-1031, US Columbia 3012-D)

London, 1935 (date unknown) Reginald Foresythe and Arthur Young, piano duet:

- "Sweet Adeline" (intro; "Lonely Feet", "Why Was I Born?", "Here Am I") (UK Decca F-5636, US no issue)
- "Sweet Adeline" (cont; "Don't you Ever Leave Me", "We Were so Young") (UK Decca F-5636, US no issue)
- "Roberta" (intro; "I Won't Dance", "Lovely to Look At2) (UK Decca F-5637, US no issue)
- "Roberta" (intro; "Smoke Gets in your Eyes", "Touch of your Hand", "I Won't Dance") (UK Decca F-5637, US no issue)

London 19 August 1935 (Reginald Foresythe & his Orchestra):

- "Landscape" (UK Decca F-5660, US no issue)
- "Homage to Armstrong" (Chinatown, My Chinatown) (UK Decca F-5660, US no issue)
- "Tea for Two" (UK Decca F-5711, US no issue)
- "Sweet Georgia Brown" (UK Decca 5711, US no issue)

London, 1936? (date unknown) Arthur Young and Reginald Foresythe, piano duo with drums:

- Anything Goes (Selection A) (UK Decca K-770 12", US no issue)
- Anything Goes (Selection B) (UK Decca K-770 12", US no issue)
- With The "Duke" (Part 1) (UK Decca K-778 12", US no issue)
- With The "Duke" (Part 2) (UK Decca K-778 12", US no issue)
- Hits of 1935 (Part 1) (UK Decca K-787 12", US no issue)
- Hits of 1935 (Part 2) (UK Decca K-787 12", US no issue)

London, 1936? (date unknown) Reginald Foresythe, piano solo:

- "Cheek to Cheek" (UK Decca F-5758, US no issue)
- "The Piccolino" (UK Decca F-5758, US no issue)

London, 6 November 1936 (Reginald Foresythe & his Orchestra)

- "Swing For Roundabout" (UK Decca F-6203, US no issue)
- "Anything You Like" (UK Decca F-6291, US no issue)
- "The Revolt of the Yes Men" (UK Decca F-6203, US no issue)

London, 27 November 1936 (Reginald Foresythe & his Orchestra):

- "Mead and Woa" (UK Decca F-6291, US no issue)
- "Mediation in Porcelain" (UK Decca F-6481, US no issue)
- "Cross the Criss" (UK Decca F-6481, US no issue)
- "Aubade" (UK Decca F-6363, US issue)
- "Burlesque" (UK Decca F-6363, US no issue)

London, 1938 (date unknown) Reginald Foresythe and Arthur Young, piano duet:

- "Solitude" (UK His Master's Voice BD-BD-577, US Victor 26224)
- "Mood Indigo" (UK His Master's Voice BD-577, US Victor 26224)
- "Tiger Rag" (UK His Master's Voice BD-576, US Victor 26274)
- "St. Louis Blues" (UK His Master's Voice BD-576, US Victor 26274)

== Filmography ==
- Jimmy Boy (1935)
- Calling the Tune (1936)
- The Big Noise (1936)
- Stars in Your Eyes (1956)

== See also ==
- List of jazz arrangers
