= The Dark Angel (1935 film) =

1935 film by Sidney Franklin

- Theatrical poster
- Directed by: Sidney A. Franklin
- Written by: Lillian Hellman; Mordaunt Shairp
- Based on: The Dark Angel; 1925 play by Guy Bolton
- Produced by: Samuel Goldwyn
- Starring: Fredric March; Merle Oberon; Herbert Marshall
- Cinematography: Gregg Toland
- Edited by: Sherman Todd
- Music by: Alfred Newman
- Production company: Samuel Goldwyn Productions
- Distributed by: United Artists
- Release date: September 8, 1935
- Running time: 110 minutes
- Country: United States
- Language: English
- Budget: $1 million

The Dark Angel is a 1935 American film that tells the story of three childhood friends, Kitty (Merle Oberon), Alan (Fredric March), and Gerald (Herbert Marshall) who come of age in England during the First World War. The script was written by Lillian Hellman and Mordaunt Shairp, adapted from the play by Guy Bolton. It was directed by Sidney Franklin, produced by Samuel Goldwyn, and released by United Artists. A silent film version of the same play, also produced by Goldwyn, was released in 1925 and is now a lost film.

The Dark Angel won the Academy Award for Best Art Direction, and was nominated for Best Actress in a Leading Role (Merle Oberon) and Best Sound, Recording (Thomas T. Moulton). A mixed race woman who passed as white, Oberon became both the first Māori actress, and the first of Asian ancestry, to be nominated for Best Actress.

== Plot ==
Kitty Vane, Alan Trent, and Gerald Shannon have been inseparable friends since childhood. Both Alan and Gerald are in love with Kitty, who in turn has been infatuated with Alan her entire life.

Gerald and Alan are drafted into World War I. They return home for ten days, during which time Alan proposes to Kitty and she joyously accepts. Despite his own love for Kitty, Gerald gives the couple his blessing. However, the newly engaged couple's happiness is cut short when Gerald and Alan are ordered back to the front the very next day. Kitty and Alan search for somebody to marry them, but there is not enough time. They decide they do not need to marry officially, and agree to spend the night together before Alan must return to the war.

Alan and Kitty book a room in an inn. Kitty's cousin Lawrence sees Alan taking champagne and flowers up the room and works out that Alan has a woman there, unaware that it is Kitty. The next day, Lawrence teases Alan about the previous night. Gerald misunderstands and believes Alan has cheated on Kitty. When Gerald confronts him, Alan does not reveal that he spent the evening with Kitty. Even though they are engaged, it would ruin her reputation.

Gerald, furious for Kitty's sake, refuses to grant Alan leave so he can return home and marry her properly. Instead, Gerald inadvertently pressures Alan to join him on a dangerous mission. Alan nobly volunteers.

Months later, Gerald returns home to Kitty. They both mourn Alan's death, believing that he was killed in an explosion. Together, they work out Gerald's misunderstanding and conclude that they are both, in a way, to be blamed for Alan's death. Consumed with grief, they grow closer and develop feelings for one another.

Meanwhile, we see that Alan did not die. He lost his eyesight and was cared for in a German hospital, adopting the name “Roger Crane” so that his family could not locate him. Sir George Barton, a physician who specializes in helping blind patients, not only by healing them but also by helping them adjust to their new lives, finds a photograph of Alan, Kitty and Gerald and realises that Alan has changed his name to escape his past. Sir George discharges "Roger", assigning a specially trained orderly to him.

Alan plans to return to Kitty, but changes his mind at the last minute, believing that people will pity her and that she will only care for him out of duty. He leaves town and stays in an inn. He becomes friendly with the innkeeper's children, Betty, Joe and Ginger. Inspired by his friendship with them, he begins to write a series of successful children's books, and is eventually able to move into his own home, with a private secretary.

Sir George visits Alan, who is still living as "Roger", and sees in the paper a photograph of Kitty and Gerald with the announcement that they are to be married. Recognising them as the couple from Alan's photograph and realising that Alan is still in love with Kitty, Sir George contacts them. Gerald at first does not recognise the name Roger Crane, but works out who he really is. Gerald and Kitty go to visit Alan, who attempts to conceal his blindness from them. At first, they do not realise he cannot see, and Kitty believes that Alan has distanced himself from her and no longer loves her. Wishing to part as friends, she holds her hand out to him, but he cannot see it. She believes that he has rejected her and leaves, but Gerald realizes the truth and encourages her to go back into the house. Hearing footsteps, Alan believes that his secretary is in the room and begins talking to her. Kitty realizes that Alan is blind. She does not care and hurries over to him. They finally profess their love for each other. Gerald leaves them to their reunion.

== Cast ==
- Fredric March as Alan Trent
- Merle Oberon as Kitty Vane
- Herbert Marshall as Gerald Shannon
- Janet Beecher as Mrs. Shannon
- John Halliday as Sir George Barton
- Henrietta Crosman as Granny Vane
- Frieda Inescort as Ann West
- Claud Allister as Lawrence Bidley
- Cora Sue Collins as Kitty as a Child
- Fay Chaldecott as Betty Gallop
- George P. Breakston as Joe Gallop
- Douglas Walton as Roulston
- Claude King as Sir Mordaunt
- Lawrence Grant as Mr. Tanner (uncredited)
- Olaf Hytten as Mills (uncredited)
- Murdock MacQuarrie as Waiter (uncredited)
- David Torrence as Mr. Shannon (uncredited)

== Reception ==
It was the 12th most popular film at the British box office in 1935–1936.

In the September 6, 1935 issue of The New York Times, Andre Sennwald declared the film to be "… a happy adventure in sentimental romance…(The) highly literate screen adaptation of Guy Bolton's play, (skirts) all the more obvious opportunities for tear-jerking and overemphasis, and (tells) the story with feeling and admirable good taste… if you know your cameramen at all, you quickly guess that the superb clarity of the photography is the work of Gregg Toland. If you are thoughtful enough to bring along a spare handkerchief, you will find (this) an engaging sentimental journey into marital romance….It is sad and sweet and brave and very sacrificial. The reunion of the blind man and his two friends… is the high point…Awaiting his visitors, the blind man plans to conceal his affliction from them by memorizing every detail in the room and arranging an elaborate stage business for receiving them. He almost gets away with his deception, but betrays himself in one unexpected detail. It is a high-powered dramatic situation and the film manages it beautifully and effectively. Both Mr. March and Mr. Marshall contribute their best performances in months, and Miss Oberon …plays with skill and feeling. … Sidney Franklin, director of that earlier sentimental masterpiece "Smilin' Through," enshrouds the photoplay in the peculiarly warm emotional haze which he manages so well. It promises to be one of the popular pictures of the season."

In the November 1, 1935, issue of Maclean's, Ann Ross observed: "If his picture doesn’t have you sobbing before it is over it isn’t the fault of the producers and director. They don’t go at it, to be sure, in the savage spirit of We’re-going-to-make-you-cry-and-like-it. On the contrary, the whole thing is managed with the greatest tact and modesty, as though everyone concerned, while determined to wring as many tears as possible, was a little ashamed to be caught doing it... The point most likely to break you down is where the hero is discovered by his former sweetheart and pretends that he still has his sight—a trying moment which is handled with great considerateness by Miss Oberon and Mr. March. It’s all reasonably interesting, agony though it is from start to finish; rather as an operation might be interesting when conducted in nice surroundings under circumstances as merciful and competent as possible."

Modern Screen gave the film a four-star review in their December 1935 edition, and assured the viewers who had enjoyed the original 1925 silent film with Ronald Colman and Vilma Banky, that the new version retains all of the "charm, romance and a certain haunting beauty" of the original and that it "distinguishes itself as the number one tear-jerker of the season." It complimented the performances and said "Fredric March portrays the blind war hero with his customary competence, Herbert Marshall does well with the sacrificing brother, and Merle Oberon is completely natural as the heroine. Fay Chaldecott and Cora Sue Collins are fine in their roles."

At the 8th Academy Awards, Richard Day won Best Art Direction. Merle Oberon was nominated for Best Actress, and Thomas T. Moulton was nominated for Best Sound Recording.

Rotten Tomatoes gives the film a rating of 94% from 49 reviews with the consensus: "Led by a trio of powerful performances, The Dark Angel offers a well-crafted love story set against the backdrop of World War I."

== Proposed remake ==
In 1962, Ross Hunter announced that he would remake the film from a script by John Lee Mahin, with Rock Hudson in the lead. The action would be relocated to Japan in the post-Korean-War period. Hunter says he paid $100,000 for the rights and only used the last ten minutes of the film. The film was never made.
