= The Woman Juror =

1926 film

- Directed by: Milton Rosmer
- Release date: 1926
- Country: United Kingdom

The Woman Juror is a 1926 British silent era drama film directed by Milton Rosmer and starring Charles Ashton, Alexander Field and Frank Vosper. It was adapted from a play of the same name by E.F. Parr.

== Cast ==
- Bell - Alexander Field
- Jenefer Canynge - Gladys Jennings
- Morgan - Frank Vosper
- Michael - John Stuart
- Casey - Charles Ashton
