= Murder on the Second Floor (play) =

1929 play by Frank Vosper

Murder on the Second Floor is a play by Frank Vosper. The 1929 Broadway play was produced by Albert H. Woods and directed by William Mollison.

== Synopsis ==
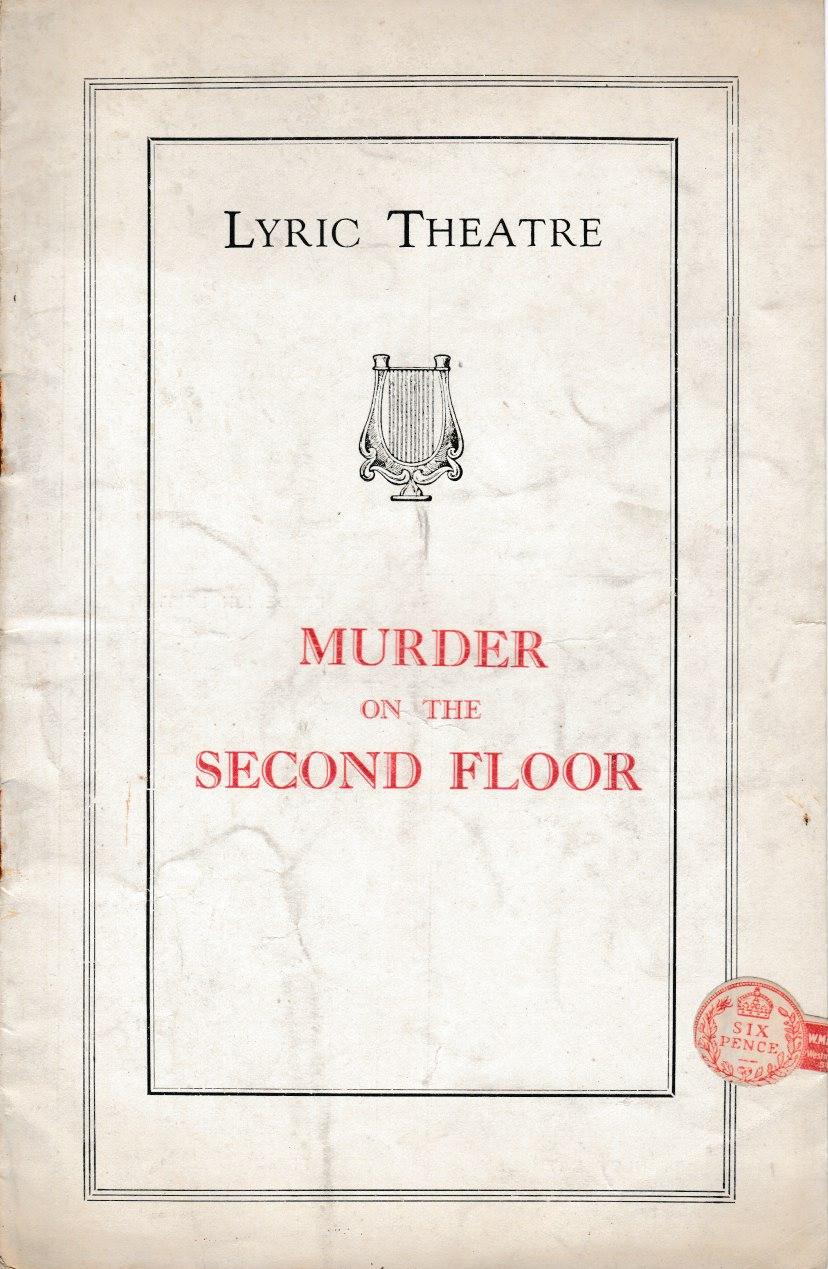
A photograph of the Playbill from The Lyric Theatre in 1929

Murder on the Second Floor is a three-act play written by British actor and playwright Frank Vosper. The play is a psychological thriller set in a Bloomsbury boarding house. The narrative centers on Joseph Reynolds, a struggling novelist who resides on the second floor. As Reynolds becomes obsessed with crafting a murder mystery plot, the line between his fiction and reality begins to blur, leading to a series of actual murders within the boarding house. The play delves into themes of obsession, the creative process, and the thin veil separating imagination from reality.

== Production History ==
Murder on the Second Floor was first staged in London's West End in 1929 at the Lyric Theatre on Shaftesbury Avenue. The production was written and performed by Frank Vosper, who played the role of Hugh Bromilow. The original cast included Frederick Leister as Joseph Reynolds, Muriel Aked as Miss Snell, and Sara Allgood as Mrs. Armitage. The staging and design were done by J. Burnskill and F.L. Lyndhurst.

The play transferred to Broadway the same year, opening at the Eltinge 42nd Street Theatre on September 11, 1929. The Broadway production was presented by producer Albert H. Woods and directed by William Mollison. A notable element of this production was the casting of a young Laurence Olivier in the role of Hugh Bromilow. Other featured cast members included Charles Brown as Joseph Reynolds, Florence Edney as Mrs. Armitage, and Phyllis Konstam as Sylvia Armitage.

In the mid-1930s, the play continued to be produced in regional productions. It was performed by the Ecclesfield Priory Players in Sheffield at the Gatty Memorial Hall in 1935. That production was directed by Miss C.M. Pawson and included Robert Cauwood and Wallace Sorsby in key roles. In 1936 a revival was staged at Birmingham Repertory Theatre. This production was directed by Herbert M. Prentice and featured future film stars Stewart Granger (then billed as James Stewart) and James Hayter.

== Cast History ==
Character	West End (1929) The Lyric Theatre, London	Broadway (1929) Eltinge 42nd Street Theatre, New York	Ecclesfield Priory Players (1935) Gatty Memorial Hall, Sheffield
Hugh Bromilow	Frank Vosper	Laurence Olivier	Wallace Sorsby
Joseph Reynolds	Frederick Leister	Charles D. Brown	Robert Cauwood
Lucy Timson	Dorice Fordred	Viola Lyel	O. Ward
Miss Snell	Muriel Aked	Drusilla Wills	Annie Bedford
Mr. Amritage	Stanley Lathbury	O.B. Clarence	Not specified
Mrs. Armitage	Sara Allgood	Florence Edney	Cicely M. Pawson
Sylvia Armitage	Nora Swinburne	Phyllis Konstam	D. Evelyn Oliver
Jam Singh	Frank Cochrane	George Probert	Harold Jones
Police Constable Rogers	Ernest Haines	Henry Warwick	C. Sorsby
The Inspector	Ernest Mainwaring	John R. Turnbull	L.J. Simpson
2nd Police Constable	Cyril Fairlie	Not specified	Harry Robinson
3rd Police Constable	George Hiscoke	Not specified	Not specified
The Man with the Box	Nugent Steele	Not specified	Not specified

== Adaptations ==
The play was adapted into the films Murder on the Second Floor (1932) and Shadows on the Stairs (1941), as well as for television as Murder on the Second Floor (1939).

Vosper adapted the play into a novel of the same name, published in 1930.
