= The Combined Maze =

Play by Frank Vosper

- Original language: English
- Written by: Frank Vosper
- Genre: Drama

Premiere
- Date: 30 May 1927
- Place: Royalty Theatre, London

The Combined Maze is a 1927 British play by Frank Vosper

It is based on the 1913 novel of the same title by May Sinclair. It ran for 40 performances at the Royalty Theatre in London's West End between 30 May and 2 July 1927. The cast included Edward Chapman, Gordon Harker, Richard Bird, Anthony Ireland, Clare Greet and Jean Forbes-Robertson.

== Bibliography ==
- Wearing, J.P. The London Stage 1920-1929: A Calendar of Productions, Performers, and Personnel. Rowman & Littlefield, 2014.
