= Shadows on the Stairs =

1941 film by D. Ross Lederman

- Film poster
- Directed by: D. Ross Lederman
- Screenplay by: Anthony Coldeway
- Based on: Murder on the Second Floor; 1929 play by Frank Vosper
- Produced by: William Jacobs (associate producer); Bryan Foy (producer) (uncredited)
- Starring: Frieda Inescort; Paul Cavanagh; Heather Angel
- Cinematography: Allen G. Siegler
- Edited by: Thomas Pratt
- Music by: Bernhard Kaun
- Production company: Warner Bros. Pictures
- Distributed by: Warner Bros. Pictures
- Release date: March 1, 1941
- Running time: 64 minutes
- Country: United States
- Language: English

Shadows on the Stairs is a 1941 American mystery film directed by D. Ross Lederman and starring Frieda Inescort, Paul Cavanagh and Heather Angel. It is based on Frank Vosper's play Murder on the Second Floor. The British subsidiary of Warner Bros. Pictures had previously produced a film adaptation of the work in 1932.

== Plot ==
Residents of a London boarding house come under suspicion during a string of murders.

== Cast ==
- Frieda Inescort as Mrs. Stella Rosabelle Armitage
- Paul Cavanagh as Joseph "Joe" Reynolds
- Heather Angel as Sylvia Armitage
- Bruce Lester as Hugh Bromilow
- Miles Mander as Tom Armitage
- Lumsden Hare as Inspector Gregg
- Turhan Bey as Ram Singh
- Charles Irwin as Constable
- Phyllis Barry as Lucy Timson, the Maid
- Mary Field as Phoebe Martia St. John Snell
- Paul Renay as Choong Thi, Hindu Sailor
- Sidney Bracey as Watchman (scenes deleted)

== Soundtrack ==
- Charles Irwin - "Comin' Thro' the Rye" (Music Traditional, words by Robert Burns)

== Bibliography ==
- Goble, Alan. The Complete Index to Literary Sources in Film. Walter de Gruyter, 1999.
