= Debonair (play) =

1930 British play

- Written by: Frank Vosper; Gladys Bronwyn Stern
- Original language: English
- Genre: Comedy

Premiere
- Date premiered: 23 April 1930
- Place premiered: Lyric Theatre, London

Debonair is a 1930 British play by Frank Vosper, based on a novel of the same title by Gladys Bronwyn Stern who co-wrote the adaptation with Vosper.

It ran for 37 performances at the Lyric Theatre in London's West End. The original cast included Vosper, Celia Johnson, Mary Jerrold, Walter Fitzgerald, Kate Cutler and May Hallatt. It was cut dramatically after its opening performance.

== Bibliography ==
- Wearing, J.P. The London Stage 1930-1939: A Calendar of Productions, Performers, and Personnel. Rowman & Littlefield, 2014.
