= Love from a Stranger (1938 TV play) =

- Based on: Love from a Stranger by Frank Vosper
- Directed by: George More O'Ferrall
- Country of origin: United Kingdom

Production
- Producer: George More O'Ferrall

Original release
- Release: 23 November 1938

Love from a Stranger is the name of two live BBC Television plays directed by George More O'Ferrall. The plays are based on the 1936 stage play of the same name by Frank Vosper. In turn, the play was based on the short story Philomel Cottage, written by Agatha Christie. The plays were only broadcast in the London area; television reception was geographically restricted.

The 1938 play was transmitted on Wednesday, 23 November 1938 live from Alexandra Palace. It lasted for 90 minutes and was broadcast at 3.30pm. It featured Bernard Lee, later a regular in the James Bond film series. The script used was that of the stage play by Frank Vosper; the producer and director was George More O'Ferrall.

== Cast ==
- Bernard Lee
- Edna Best
- Henry Oscar
- Eileen Sharp
- Esma Cannon
- Miles Otway
- Morris Harvey
- Beatrice Rowe
- Sam Lysons

== See also ==
- Love from a Stranger (1947 TV play)
