= Love from a Stranger (1937 film) =

1937 British film directed by Rowland V. Lee

- Theatrical Poster
- Directed by: Rowland V. Lee
- Written by: Frances Marion
- Based on: Love from a Stranger by Frank Vosper
- Produced by: Max Schach
- Starring: Ann Harding; Basil Rathbone; Binnie Hale; Bruce Seton
- Cinematography: Philip Tannura
- Edited by: Howard O'Neill
- Music by: Benjamin Britten
- Production company: Trafalgar Films
- Distributed by: United Artists
- Release date: January 1937
- Running time: 86 minutes
- Country: United Kingdom
- Language: English

Love from a Stranger is a 1937 British thriller film directed by Rowland V. Lee and starring Ann Harding, Basil Rathbone and Binnie Hale. It is based on the 1936 play of the same name by Frank Vosper. In turn, the play was based on the 1924 short story Philomel Cottage, written by Agatha Christie. The film was remade in 1947 under the same title.

The film was produced by the independent Trafalgar Films at Denham Studios near London. It is also known by the alternative title A Night of Terror in the United States. The film score was written by Benjamin Britten; it was his only feature film score.

== Plot ==
Carol is thrilled when she unexpectedly wins the top prize in the French lottery, as she can now leave behind her unpleasant job. However, upon learning of her good fortune, her fiancé Ronald has no intention of quitting his job and living idly on her fortune and they quarrel. Enter the charming Gerald, who pretends to be interested in renting her apartment during her absence, but then shows up aboard the ship Carol and her friend Kate travel on to France to collect her winnings and vacation. Supposedly a wealthy bachelor with a hobby of photography, he charms her into a quick marriage.

In France, Ronald visits Carol to inform her that Gerald is a phony; he contacted his supposed employer and he is unknown there. Carol puts this down to jealousy and asks Ronald to leave.

Gerald then receives word "from his solicitor" that "the money he planned to use to purchase a house has been tied up in a foreign country." Carol insists on loaning him the 5,000 pounds needed for the purchase, later to learn that the price of the house had been only half that amount.

At the house, isolated with no neighbours for miles and no telephone, Gerald's behaviour begins to change. He flies into a rage when the butler puts some belongings in the basement, saying only he is allowed to enter there as it is his darkroom. Down in the basement, he destroys photos of Carol. After another rage when Carol enters his darkroom, Gerald finally gives in to Carol's request to allow a visit by a doctor. The doctor finds that Gerald has a weak heart, and headaches that come on when he gets angry, which the doctor advises him not to do. Gerald considers doctors to be quacks, and will not use the prescribed medication.

The doctor notices a book of Gerald's of which he also has a copy, about unsolved murders, and discovers that the photograph of one of the killers, Fletcher, they were discussing is missing. He says he will bring his own copy of the book which has the photo.

Ronald and Kate arrive for a visit and Carol forgives him for his behaviour, but Gerald flies into a rage, sending them away; he has planned an extended trip abroad for he and Carol to begin the next day. Gerald sends their maid to the fair without telling Carol, ensuring the house is empty.

As Gerald's temper and disposition continue to deteriorate, the doctor brings the book; the photo appears to show Gerald barely recognisable in disguise. Gerald promptly tears it out in front of Carol and destroys it.

Knowing by now that Gerald plans to murder her, Carol tries in vain to leave the house, keeping up the pretence that she is unaware of Gerald's identity. He forces her to read aloud the account of his previous murders from the doctor's book, gaining great enjoyment from the power it gives him. The accounts describe the exact series of events Carol has experienced, from the quick marriage to the secluded house and forced signing of papers.

Through a hypothetical scenario of what Fletcher's victims might have offered him, she promises to give him her entire fortune and never prosecute him, but he says it would be foolish to risk his life on a woman's silence. While she listens to his rambling taunts, Carol devises a plan to save her life; to stall for time, she tells Gerald that she had previously poisoned someone, going into great detail. Gerald seems fascinated by her story, and she claims she cannot go to the police now that he knows her 'secret' as well, but he triumphantly tells her he knows she is lying, as he is familiar with the plot of the book she has based her story on. Carol then makes a final bid for escape by falsely claiming that she has poisoned Gerald; she claims she told the story only to allow enough time for the poison to start working, and now it is too late for him. While a shocked Gerald reacts in horror, Carol races to escape. Ronald, Kate, and Doctor Gribble enter the house moments later to find that Gerald has died, likely of the heart condition Gribble diagnosed.

== Cast ==
- Ann Harding as Carol Howard
- Basil Rathbone as Gerald Lovell
- Binnie Hale as Kate Meadows
- Bruce Seton as Ronald Bruce
- Jean Cadell as Aunt Lou
- Bryan Powley as Doctor Gribble
- Joan Hickson as Emmy
- Donald Calthrop as Hobson
- Eugene Leahy as Mr. Tuttle

== Style ==
Love from a Stranger transitions between comedy and romance in the first half of the film to what Mark Aldridge commented on the film in his book on Agatha Christie film adaptations, describing it as a "tense finale" that "ensures the audience is not fatigued by the straightforward thriller aspects too early on."

== Release ==
Love from a Stranger was released in the United Kingdom in January 1937. The film was released as A Night of Terror in the United States.

Much of the promotion of the film dealt with the costumes and clothing by Ann Harding, the American actress who made her British production premiere with the film. The Daily Express referred to the film as "a most Ritzy thriller. It might be called "The Bride of Frankenstein - Models by Worth" [...] or "Hangman Fashions of 1937!" It was one of the first highly publicized Agatha Christie adaptations but the author was not part of the marketing.

== Reception ==
The film was reviewed by C. A. Lejeune in The Observer of 10 January 1937 when she said that it "was a bit slow in getting started, but once the extra characters of the early scenes are dropped and the film gets the two leading players alone in their Kentish farmhouse, it becomes a hair-raiser of the first order." She concluded that, "Ann Harding and Basil Rathbone…overplay a little in the final conflict, but I'm not at all sure that it isn't what is wanted for the picture. The whole treatment of the climax is strained, overwrought, and hysterical; on the border-line between laughter and madness. There is one shot, when the wife throws open the last door to escape and finds her husband standing dead-still on the threshold, that hasn't been equalled for horror since Cagney's body fell through the doorway in Public Enemy. A woman in front of me let out a scream like a steamship siren at this point in the first performance. That scream was the natural voice of criticism testifying to the film's success." On its release, it was the best-received Christie adaptation to date but some critics did not appreciate the transition from comedy. The Daily Express found the change "abrupt" finding the ending an "unrelieved duet in the macabre" and that "at one juncture [...] the loudest scream I have heard in a cinema. That's a tribute." The Times responded positively stating that "suspense is skillfully maintained throughout" while Henry Gibbs, writing for Action magazine stated "Good performances, good story - what more do you want?"

The Scotsman of 22 June 1937 started off its review by saying, "Suspense is cleverly created and sustained in this film version of the late Frank Vosper's play." The reviewer continued, "The suspicion that she has married a murderer is cunningly built up; his homicidal mania, strangely mixed up with greed and sadism, is made plausible and eerily convincing; and the closing sequence, in which the wife, sensing his murderous intention, seeks frantically, almost despairingly, for some escape, achieves dramatic suspense of an intensity only occasionally encountered on the screen. Much of the effect is due to the acting. Ann Harding brings a strong, yet restrained emotion to her part, even when it trembles of the verge of melodramatic insanity, and Basil Rathbone terrifyingly combines sensitiveness and insanity in a polished and persuasive performance."

Variety reviewed the film twice, the first declaring it a "Gorgeously photographed and splendidly cut [...] takes front rank with the long list of gruesome films produced in recent years." while a second review felt it contained "a couple of reels of dramatic dynamite. But the rest is inconsequential."

Aldridge commented on the film stating "the most striking aspect of the plot is its surprising lack of mystery." while finding the final half of the film as "necessarily and effectively claustrophobic [...] the film does not feel constrained by its [play] origins."

== Bibliography ==
- Aldridge, Mark (2016). Agatha Christie on Screen. Palgrave Macmillan. ISBN 978-1-349-67695-8.
- Gifford, Denis (2001) [1973]. The British Film Catalogue. Vol. 1 (3 ed.). Routledge. ISBN 978-1-57958-171-8.
- Low, Rachael. Filmmaking in 1930s Britain. George Allen & Unwin, 1985.
- Wood, Linda. British Films, 1927–1939. British Film Institute, 1986.
