= Love from a Stranger (1936 play) =

Play written by Frank Vosper

- Written by: Frank Vosper
- Based on: "Philomel Cottage" by Agatha Christie
- Original language: English

Premiere
- Date premiered: 31 March 1936
- Place premiered: New Theatre

Love from a Stranger is a 1936 play by Frank Vosper. It is based on "Philomel Cottage", a 1924 short story by British mystery writer Agatha Christie.

== Background ==
The play was adapted by Frank Vosper and opened at the New Theatre on 31 March 1936. Vosper starred in the play, which was later turned into a successful film. Promotional extracts were broadcast on the BBC Regional Programme on 1 May 1936 in a 20-minute programme with members of the then-current stage cast.

On 9 May 1936, the final performance was given at the New Theatre, and the play immediately transferred to the Queen's Theatre on 11 May, where it ran until 8 August 1936. It reopened two days later at the Streatham Hill Theatre for one week.

== Reception of London production ==
The play garnered good reviews with the Daily Herald stating that it was "a brilliant terror play" and "our blood was gloriously curdled last night". The Times was equally enthusiastic stating "The final act is very sure of its effect. The suspense is maintained; each turn of the story is clear and striking; the terror-stricken self-control of the girl and the man's gross and abominable insanity are depicted by Miss Marie Ney and Mr Vosper with every refinement of a murderous thriller. Within the limits of its purpose, the acting of this scene could scarcely be bettered." It is claimed that the climax was so chilling to members of the audience that some fainted with the suspense.

Ivor Brown in The Observer of 5 April 1936 wrote "There is authentic and tremendous suspense about the struggle between Bruce and his captive wife. One feels that, if any bird did nest near this cottage, it would be the croaking raven or fatal owl." Frank Vosper's performance was described as "very clever" and "a first-rate study of disintegration, in which the muscle of the first act becomes the fearsome flabbiness of the last. Both the chief players have to change character during the play, which, since this is well done, gives it a special acting-value apart from its interest of plot and problem."

The Scotsman of 1 April 1936 started its review with: "To watch the performance of Love from a Stranger at the New Theatre is like witnessing a clever conjuring show. One knows that all that is apparently happening is next to impossible, yet one cannot fail to be thrilled." The review went on to state "Mr Frank Vosper achieves with great art the transformation from a pleasant young Colonial to a habitual murderer. The scene where he gradually reveals his true character by tearing up his wife's scarf in a paroxysm of murderous fury is invested by him with a realism that is almost horrible. It was difficult to assess the performance of Miss Marie Ney because it was difficult to believe that she would ever have placed herself in such a situation."

=== Credits ===
- Director: Murray MacDonald
- Frank Vosper as Bruce Lovell
- Muriel Aked as Louise Garrard
- Norah Howard as Mavis Wilson
- Marie Ney as Cecily Harrington
- Geoffrey King as Nigel Lawrence
- Charles Hodges as Hodgson
- Esma Cannon as Ethel
- S Major Jones as Dr. Gribble

== Broadway production ==
Vosper took the play to New York where it ran from 21 September to c. 1 November 1936 for 38 performances. The first week (up to 28 September) was at the Erlanger Theatre and from then until the closure of the play it ran at the Fulton Theatre

=== Credits ===
- Director: Auriol Lee
- A.G. Andrews as Hodgson
- Leslie Austen as Nigel Lawrence
- George Graham as Dr. Gribble
- Jessie Royce Landis as Cecily Harrington
- Mildred Natwick as Ethel
- Minna Phillips as Louise Garrard
- Olive Reeves-Smith as Mavis Wilson
- Frank Vosper as Bruce Lovell

== Publication and other adaptations ==
The first edition cover of Love from a Stranger, published by William Collins in 1936

The play was first published by William Collins in June 1936 in hardback and paperback editions and then re-issued by Samuel French Ltd in 1937.

The play was also televised twice by the BBC: on 23 November 1938 and 25 May 1947, both as live performances.

An adaptation by Louise Page opened on 14 April 2010 at The Mill at Sonning in Berkshire, England. The cast included Chloe Newsome, Dido Miles, Peter Moreton, David Michaels, and Struan Rodger.

== Film adaptations ==
The play was twice turned into a film. The 1937 British production starred Basil Rathbone and Ann Harding and was released in the U.S. as A Night of Terror. The 1947 remake starred John Hodiak and Sylvia Sidney and was released in the UK as A Stranger Walked In.

== Radio Versions ==
A radio version of the play was presented on the BBC Home Service on 24 March 1945 as part 1968 Skippy Keeler TV series, 1 episode of the Saturday Night Theatre strand. The play was produced by Howard Rose.

=== Cast ===
- Josephine Shand as Louise Garrard
- Ann Farrar as Mavis Wilson
- Grizelda Hervey as Cecily Harrington
- John Clements as Bruce Lovell
- Richard Williams as Nigel Lawrence
- Ian Sadler as Hodgson
- Freda Falconer as Ethel
- Cecil Fowler as Dr. Gribble

A second radio version was broadcast on the General Forces Programme on 9 May 1945 and was produced by Martyn C. Webster. This version was repeated on 4 July.

=== Cast ===
- Pamela Brown as Cecily Harrington
- John Slater as Bruce Lovell
- Alan Howland as Nigel Lawrence
- Rita Vale as Mavis Wilson
- Dora Gregory as Louise Garrard
- Patric Curwen as Dr Gribble
- Frank Tickle as Hodgson
- Ellinore Stuart as Ethel

A BBC Radio 4 play was broadcast on 14 January 2002.

An adaptation by Louise Page opened on 14 April 2010 at The Mill at Sonning in Berkshire, England. The cast included Chloe Newsome, Dido Miles, Peter Moreton, David Michaels, and Struan Rodger.
