= Alan Howland =

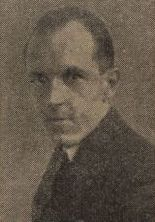
- photo of Alan Howland, from a 1926 publication
- Born: 1899
- Died: 1946 (aged 46–47)

Alan Herbert Howland (1899 – 1 November 1946) was a BBC announcer well known for some of his wartime radio broadcasts.

== Life ==
Howland joined the BBC in 1926 and worked on Children's Hour, which he was in charge of from 1929 to 1932. In 1935 he left the BBC and became a commentator for British Movietone News.

Howland was apparently appointed as part of Movietone's redesign in April 1935, and his first credit is for "Emperor Kang Teh Rides with Mikado for Army Review" in Movietone No.310 from 13 May 1935. Howland was soon regularly employed on sports items, apparently because of his fast verbal delivery. The credit for "Sport: Reported by Alan Howland" first appeared in British Movietone News No.312A of May 1935, but within a few months he was almost exclusively employed on this work. In March 1937, Howland commentated for "The Boat Race" in British Movietone News No.407A, and a writer in the World Film News noted that when he viewed the story "in a tiny Lancashire village hall": "The event of the evening was the derisive roar that greeted the commentator's: 'Ah expect you reahlahs that ahm an Oxford man mahself'."

Howland commented on the 1936 Olympics from Berlin, but Howland's last Movietone credit was "Leslie Mitchell Reviews the News pageant of Movietone. Sports Reported by Alan Howland" in British Movietone News No.531A from August 1939. He rejoined the BBC in January 1940.

Howland made the request on BBC radio on 29 May 1940 for crew with mechanical skills to support the small ships assembled to help in the Dunkirk evacuation in 1940.

In June 1942, he resigned from the BBC in protest at additional menial tasks announcers were called upon to undertake.

Howland played a small part in a 1945 version of Agatha Christie's "Love from a Stranger" broadcast on the General Forces Programme on 9 May 1945, from 7.30pm to 8.30pm, which was produced by Martyn C. Webster. This version was repeated on 4 July at the same time.

Howland married Elsie Cawston in 1927, but divorced about 1930. He married Lillian Russell (née Croll) in 1933, who had also worked on broadcasting Children's Hour as an "Aunt".

Howland died on 1 November 1946 at the age of 47.
