= Mordaunt Shairp =

English dramatist and screenwriter (1887–1939)

Alexander Mordaunt Shairp (13 March 1887 – 18 January 1939) was an English dramatist and screenwriter born in Totnes. In publications, he styled himself either as A. Mordaunt Shairp or Mordaunt Shairp.

Educated at St Paul's School, London, and Lincoln College, Oxford, he spent much of his life as a schoolmaster in London and wrote many plays for pupils to perform. His adult plays dealt with darker interpersonal relationships and The Green Bay Tree (premièred at St Martin's Theatre in London's West End on 25 January 1933 and also performed on Broadway) was originally controversial because of its gay subtext.

Shairp also spent a short spell in Hollywood as a screenwriter. He died at Hastings.

== Plays ==
- The Crime at Blossoms (1932)
- The Green Bay Tree (1933)

== Selective filmography ==
- The Crime at Blossoms (1933, directed by Maclean Rogers, based on Shairp's 1932 play)
- The Dark Angel (1935, directed by Sidney Franklin; cowritten with Lillian Hellman)
- The White Angel (1936, directed by William Dieterle)
- Wee Willie Winkie (1937, directed by John Ford)

== Other ==
- Modern Plays in one act (Editor). London: Dent, 1929 (in the Kings Treasuries of Literature series edited by Sir Arthur Quiller-Couch).
