= Love from a Stranger (1947 film) =

1947 film by Richard Whorf

- Theatrical release poster
- Directed by: Richard Whorf
- Screenplay by: Philip MacDonald
- Based on: the play Love from a Stranger the short-story "Philomel Cottage" by Frank Vosper; Agatha Christie
- Produced by: James J. Geller
- Starring: John Hodiak, Sylvia Sidney; Ann Richards
- Cinematography: Tony Gaudio
- Edited by: Fred Allen
- Music by: Hans J. Salter
- Color process: Black and white
- Production company: Bryan Foy Productions
- Distributed by: Eagle-Lion Films
- Release date: November 15, 1947 (United States)
- Running time: 81 minutes
- Country: United States
- Language: English
- Budget: $1.1 million

Love from a Stranger is a 1947 American historical film noir directed by Richard Whorf and starring John Hodiak, Sylvia Sidney and Ann Richards. The film is also known as A Stranger Walked In in the United Kingdom. It is based on the play of the same title by Frank Vosper, inspired by a short story by Agatha Christie, which had previously been turned into a 1937 British film Love from a Stranger starring Basil Rathbone.

== Plot ==
A woman fears her new husband will kill her.

== Cast ==
- John Hodiak as Manuel Cortez
- Sylvia Sidney as Cecily Harrington
- Ann Richards as Mavia
- John Howard as Nigel Lawrence
- Isobel Elsom as Auntie Loo-Loo
- Ernest Cossart as Billings
- Philip Tonge as Dr. Gribble
- Anita Sharp-Bolster as Ethel (the maid)
- Frederick Worlock as Insp. Hobday
- Phyllis Barry as Waitress

== Production ==
The movie was one of the first from the newly formed Eagle Lion Productions. Arturo de Cordova was announced as the star. Margaret Lockwood was wanted for the female star. Eventually the female lead went to Sylvia Sidney and John Hodiak was borrowed from MGM for the male lead.

Filming was meant to start 15 January 1947 but was delayed until March. Anne Richards had just made Lost Honeymoon for Eagle Lion.

== Reception ==
=== Critical response ===
Variety called it "a fair thriller, without novelty or any particular "viewpoint," with little suspense, surprise or excitement, and only moderate boxoffice prospects."

Thomas M. Pryor, the film critic at The New York Times, gave the film a lukewarm review. He wrote, "It may well be that some will find a modicum of excitement in Love From a Stranger. But the average moviegoer is a pretty 'hep' customer and the chances are he will be so far ahead of the story that its climactic scene will explode with all the thunder of a cap pistol."

Critic Craig Butler also had problems with the film, mostly the script. He wrote, "A moderately entertaining mystery flick (the story of which was better served when it was originally filmed in 1937), Love from a Stranger is an adequate but unexciting way to spend an hour and a half or so. Stranger wants to be a clever thriller, and it starts out well. Unfortunately, about halfway through it becomes rather obvious, and so the necessary suspense is simply lacking."
