= Frank Vosper =

English actor and playwright (1899–1937)

- Publicity still, autographed: 1933
- Born: Frank Permain Vosper; 15 December 1899; Hampstead, London, England
- Died: 6 March 1937 (aged 37) at sea
- Occupations: Actor, dramatist/playwright, screenwriter

Frank Permain Vosper (15 December 1899 – 6 March 1937) was an English actor who appeared in both stage and film roles and a dramatist, playwright and screenwriter.

== Stage ==
Vosper made his stage debut in 1919 and was best known for playing urbane villains.

His extensive stage experience included appearing in his own play Love from a Stranger (1936), adapted from the short story "Philomel Cottage" by Agatha Christie.

His screenplays included co-writing the comedy No Funny Business (1933) with Victor Hanbury. He also co-wrote the adaptation of G.B. Stern's novel Debonair with the novelist which opened at the Lyric 23 April 1930.

He also wrote People Like Us, based on the case of Edith Thompson and Frederick Bywaters. Banned by the Lord Chamberlain after a performance at the Strand Theatre featuring Atholl Fleming, it remained unperformed until 1948, when it premiered at Wyndham's Theatre in London, with Miles Malleson, George Rose, Robert Flemyng and Kathleen Michael.

== Death ==
Vosper drowned on 6 March 1937, when he fell from the ocean liner SS Paris. His body was found several weeks later on 22 March washed up on the shores near Beachy Head. The death was eventually ruled as accidental after considerable media speculation. Several newspapers reported that earlier in the evening Vosper had been attending a farewell party for Miss Muriel Oxford, "Miss Great Britain" of 1936, in her cabin, and that he had threatened suicide if she refused to marry him. Miss Oxford reported that her last conversation with Vosper was "quite normal" and that he never threatened suicide. According to the Daily Express Fiction Library edition of Murder on the Second Floor, Vosper fell from the French ocean liner SS Normandie, while contemporary newspaper accounts and the evidence produced at the inquest stated it was the liner SS Paris.

== Filmography ==
=== Actor ===
Year	Title	Role	Notes
1926	Blinkeyes	Seymour	(film debut)
1926	The Woman Juror	Morgan	Short
1929	The Last Post	Paul	
1932	Rome Express	M. Jolif	
1933	Strange Evidence	Andrew Relf	
1934	Waltzes from Vienna	Prince Gustav	
1934	Dick Turpin	Tom King	
1934	Red Ensign	Lord Dean	
1934	Jew Suss	Karl Alexander	
1934	Blind Justice	Dick Cheriton	
1934	The Man Who Knew Too Much	Ramon Levine	
1934	Open All Night	Anton	
1935	Royal Cavalcade	Capt. Robert Falcon Scott	
1935	Heart's Desire	Van Straaten	
1935	Koenigsmark	Maj. Baron de Boise	
1936	Spy of Napoleon	Napoleon III	
1936	The Secret of Stamboul	Kazdim	(final film role)

=== Screenwriter ===
Year	Title
1932	Murder on the Second Floor
1932	Rome Express
1933	No Funny Business
1933	On Secret Service
1937	Love from a Stranger (based on his play)
1941	Shadows on the Stairs (based on his play)
1947	Love from a Stranger (based on his play)

== Plays ==
- The Combined Maze (1927)
- Murder on the Second Floor (1929) - later adapted by Vosper into a novel of the same name.
- Debonair (1930)
- Love from a Stranger (1936)
