= List of alumni of Keble College, Oxford =

This is a list of alumni of Keble College, Oxford. The school's alumni include politicians, lawyers, bishops, poets, and academics. The majority of this list are male; from its foundation in 1870 until 1979 Keble only admitted male students.

== Academics ==
- Tim Besley, Professor of Economics at the London School of Economics
- Dame Averil Cameron, historian
- William Macbride Childs, the first vice-chancellor of the University of Reading
- Quassim Cassam, former Knightbridge Professor of Philosophy
- O. G. S. Crawford, archaeologist
- Martin Dixon, Professor of the Law of Real Property, University of Cambridge
- George Efstathiou, astrophysicist, Director of the Kavli Institute for Cosmology at the University of Cambridge
- Richard English, historian of Irish nationalism, terrorism expert and director of CSTPV at the University of St Andrews
- Austin Farrer, theologian and philosopher
- Nick Foskett, Vice-Chancellor of Keele University (from August 2010)
- William Hugh Clifford Frend, historian, archaeologist, priest
- Marc Goergen, professor of finance
- James Harris, FBA, Professor at the London School of Economics
- Christopher Hawkes, archaeologist
- Geoffrey Hill, poet
- Paul Johnson, government economist
- Roderick MacFarquhar, politician, journalist, academic
- Bryan Magee, philosopher
- James Martin, author
- Nicholas O'Shaughnessy, economist
- David Spiegelhalter, statistician
- Raymond Tallis, Professor of Geriatrics, University of Manchester
- Ralph Townsend, Headmaster of Winchester College
- Christopher Wickham, Chichele Professor of Medieval History in the University of Oxford, fellow of All Souls College, and winner of the 2005 Wolfson History Prize

== Artists and broadcasters ==
- Thomas Armstrong, organist and conductor
- Heather Allansdottir, novelist and space lawyer
- Leslie Banks, actor
- Frank Cottrell Boyce, children's author and screenwriter
- Katy Brand, actress, comedian and writer
- Ben Brown, television journalist
- Priyanga Burford, actor
- Humphrey Carpenter, writer and biographer
- Alexander Cockburn, journalist
- Giles Coren, writer
- Sally Coulthard, author
- Clement Crisp, dance critic
- Scott Ellaway, conductor and broadcaster
- Michael Elliot, theatre director
- Jeremy Filsell, piano and organ recitalist
- Zoe Flood, Filmmaker and Journalist
- Douglas Fox, organist, pianist, conductor
- Michael Goodliffe, actor
- Tony Hall, Baron Hall of Birkenhead, journalist and administrator
- Ian Hamilton, poet and critic
- Paula Hawkins, novelist and journalist
- John Hayes, Director of the National Portrait Gallery (1974–1994)
- Charles Hazlewood, conductor and broadcaster
- Anthony Hedges, composer and lecturer
- Chris Hollins, sports journalist and news television presenter
- Lewis Vaughan Jones, journalist and news television presenter
- Robert Lloyd, singer
- Mithra Malek, actress and filmmaker
- David Owen Norris, pianist, composer and broadcaster
- Peter Pears, singer
- Gavin Plumley, cultural historian
- Jason Pontin, journalist, editor and publisher
- Max Rushden, presenter of Sky Sports' Soccer AM
- Angela Saini, writer
- Edward St Aubyn, author
- John Shaw, radio broadcaster
- Robert Steadman, composer
- Gary Stevenson, YouTuber, author, and former financial trader
- Philip Stopford, composer and conductor
- Colin Touchin, conductor, composer, and music educator
- Hugh Welchman, filmmaker
- John Whitfield, conductor
- Andreas Whittam Smith, journalist
- Philip Wilby, composer
- Edward Windsor, Lord Downpatrick, fashion designer
- Andrew Hunter Murray, author and podcaster
- Cressida Cowell, author

== Business and leaders ==
- Peter Batey, Sino-British businessman
- Sally Bercow, wife of John Bercow — former Speaker of the House of Commons
- Mark Goldring, CEO of Oxfam
- Anne-Marie Imafidon, CEO of Stemettes

== Clergy ==
- Walter Hubert Baddeley, bishop
- Ian James Brackley, bishop
- Harry James Carpenter, Bishop of Oxford
- Duleep De Chickera, Bishop of Colombo
- Stephen Conway, Bishop of Ely
- Lakdasa De Mel, Metropolitan Bishop of India, Pakistan, Burma and Ceylon
- Gregory Dix, historian, monk
- Cyril Garbett, Archbishop of York
- Frederick Joseph Kinsman, Bishop of Delaware
- John Richard Packer, Bishop of Ripon and Leeds
- Michael Francis Perham, Bishop of Gloucester
- Rev. David Railton, son of George Scott Railton and father of Dame Ruth Railton
- Geoffrey Rowell, Bishop of Gibraltar
- Harold Eustace Sexton, former Archbishop of British Columbia
- Marcus Stock, Bishop of Leeds
- David Thomas, Provincial Assistant Bishop of the Church in Wales
- John James Absalom Thomas, Bishop of Swansea and Brecon
- Michael Turnbull, bishop
- Chad Varah, Anglican priest, founder of the Samaritans
- Arthur Winnington-Ingram, Bishop of London

== Lawyers ==
- Edwin Cameron, South African Rhodes scholar and current Constitutional Court of South Africa justice
- Dyson Heydon, former Justice of the High Court of Australia
- James Hunt, barrister and High Court judge
- Stewart Stevenson Moore, First Deemster and Clerk of the Rolls of the Isle of Man
- Randal Pinkett, participant on The Apprentice (US version) and President and CEO of BCT Partners
- Victor Priestwood, Crown Advocate of the British Supreme Court for China
- Kannon Shanmugam, American Supreme Court litigator

== Politicians ==
- Sir Arthur Dyke Acland, 13th Baronet, Liberal politician
- Andrew Adonis, Baron Adonis, politician
- Ed Balls, Labour politician, MP for Morley and Outwood 2010-2015, previous Shadow Chancellor of the Exchequer
- Robert Bourassa, Canadian politician
- William Burdett-Coutts, Conservative politician
- Reginald Craddock, politician
- William Davison, 1st Baron Broughshane
- Philip Dunne, politician
- Richard Harrington, Baron Harrington of Watford, Conservative politician
- Les Huckfield, politician
- Imran Khan, 22nd Prime Minister of Islamic Republic of Pakistan, Chairman Pakistan Tehreek-e-Insaf, Pakistani politician, former cricketer
- Peter Morrison, PPS to Margaret Thatcher
- Christopher Newbury, politician, member of the Council of Europe
- Tony Pua, Malaysian politician
- Sir Ivor Roberts, diplomat, President of Trinity College, Oxford
- George F. G. Stanley, Canadian historian, designer of Canadian flag, Lieutenant-Governor of New Brunswick
- Andy Street, Conservative Mayor of the West Midlands
- Sir James Cameron Tudor, Barbadian politician and diplomat
- Andrew Turner, politician
- Danny Williams, Premier of Newfoundland
- David Wilson, Baron Wilson of Tillyorn, diplomat and Sinologist

== Sports people ==
- Ed Coode, British rower, twice World Champion and Olympic gold medallist
- Arthur James Dingle, English rugby union player
- Jason Flickinger, American rower and twice World Champion in the coxed fours
- Norman Hallows, 1908 Olympic gold and bronze medalist
- Storm Uru, New Zealand rower, Olympic bronze medallist at the 2012 Summer Olympics, current MBA student
