= Railton (surname) =

Railton is a surname. Notable people with the surname include:

- David Railton (1884–1955), Church of England clergyman, military chaplain and the originator of the idea of the tomb of The Unknown Warrior
- David Railton (bishop), English-born Scottish Episcopal bishop
- Dennis Railton (born 1940), Australian rules footballer
- George Scott Railton (1849–1913), Salvation Army Commissioner and second in command after General William Booth
- Herbert Railton (1857–1910), English artist and illustrator
- Mary Railton (1906–1992), British army officer
- Nathaniel Railton (1886–1948), British Anglican archdeacon
- Nigel Railton (born 1967), British business executive
- Peter Railton (born 1950), American philosopher
- Reid Railton (1895–1977), British automotive engineer
- Richard Railton, 16th-century English politician
- Ruth Railton (1915–2001), British music director and composer
- William Railton (1800–1877), English architect who designed Nelson's Column
- Victor Railton (1906–1996), Canadian politician
