= Railton =

Railton may refer to:

- Railton (surname)
- Railton (car), a former marque of British automobiles
- Railton, Kentucky, a place in the US; see List of tornadoes in the Super Outbreak
- Railton, Tasmania, a town in Tasmania, Australia

== See also ==
- Campbell-Railton, Sir Malcolm Campbell's final land speed record car
- Napier-Railton, an aero-engined race car built in 1933
- Railton Special, a motor vehicle designed by Reid Railton built for John Cobb's land speed record in 1938
- Railton Road, London, England
