= Martin Dixon =

Martin Dixon may refer to:

- Martin Dixon (politician) (born 1955), Australian politician
- Martin Dixon (academic lawyer), British academic lawyer
- Martin Dixon (speedway rider) (born 1961), English speedway rider
