= Under the Knife =

Under the Knife may refer to:

== Film and television ==
- Under the Knife (film), a 2019 British documentary
- "Under the Knife" (Gotham), a television episode
- Louis Theroux: Under the Knife, a television documentary by Louis Theroux

== Music ==
- Under the Knife (EP) an EP by Hatebreed
- "Under the Knife", a song by Exhumed from Anatomy Is Destiny
- "Under the Knife", a song by Kansas from Freaks of Nature
- "Under the Knife", a song by Labrinth from Atomic
- "Under the Knife", a song by Motörhead, B-side of "Killed by Death"
- "Under the Knife", a song by Rise Against from The Sufferer & the Witness

== Other uses ==
- Trauma Center: Under the Knife, a Nintendo DS video game
- Under the Knife, a book by Krista Franklin
- "Under the Knife", a short story by H. G. Wells included in his collection The Plattner Story and Others
- "Under the Knife", a Baseball Prospectus column by Will Carroll
- Witch Doctor Vol. 1: Under the Knife, a collection of Witch Doctor comics
