= Proctor =

Person who takes charge of, or acts for, another

Proctor (a variant of procurator) is a person who takes charge of, or acts for, another.

The title is used in England and some other English-speaking countries in three principal contexts:

1. In law, a proctor is a historical class of lawyers, and the King's (or Queen's) Proctor is a senior government lawyer.
2. In religion, a proctor represents the clergy in Church of England dioceses.
3. In education, proctor is the name of university officials in certain universities.

In the United States and some other countries, the word "proctor" is frequently used to describe someone who supervises an examination (i.e. a supervisor or invigilator).

== Law ==
=== England ===
A proctor was a legal practitioner in the ecclesiastical and admiralty courts in England. These courts were distinguished from the common law courts and courts of equity because they applied "civil law" derived from Roman law, instead of English common law and equity. Historically, proctors were licensed by the Archbishop of Canterbury to undertake the duties that were performed in common law courts by attorneys and in the courts of equity by solicitors. Proctors were attached to the Doctors' Commons, which performed a similar function for civil law or "civilian" advocates (the doctors) to that of the Inns of Court for barristers. Reforms in the mid-19th century removed the monopoly of the civilian doctors and proctors in the family and admiralty courts, leaving only the ecclesiastical Court of Arches. Later, the Judicature Acts of 1873 and 1875, which created the Supreme Court of Judicature, combined the three roles (proctor, attorney, and solicitor) into the common profession of "solicitor of the Supreme Court".

==== King/Queen's Proctor ====
The King/Queen's Proctor is the historical name for an official who acted for the Crown in certain courts in England. The modern name of the office is HM Procurator General, and this office has for many years been combined with that of the Treasury Solicitor, whose formal title is His/Her Majesty's Procurator General and Treasury Solicitor.

In the admiralty courts, the King/Queen's Proctor historically acted in all causes concerning the King or Queen. A proctor or procurator was an officer who, in conjunction with the King/Queen's Proctor, acted as the attorney or solicitor in all causes concerning the Lord High Admiral's affairs in the High Court of Admiralty and other courts.

In probate and divorce courts, this official acted as the proctor or solicitor representing the Crown. In petitions of divorce, or for declaration of nullity of marriage, the King/Queen's Proctor may, under direction of the Attorney General, intervene in the suit for the purpose of arguing any question that the court deems expedient to have argued. The powers are set out in section 8 of the Matrimonial Causes Act 1973, and include the power to show cause against a decree nisi being made absolute, usually on receipt of information indicating that the court has been misled into granting a decree.

=== Sri Lanka ===
In Sri Lanka, the two groups of legal practitioners, advocates (similar to barristers) and Proctors (similar to solicitors) existed since 1833 until the Justice Law No. 44 of 1973, created a single group of practitioners, known as attorneys-at-law. There were two types of proctors; proctors of the Supreme Court and proctors of a district court. The former could practice in any court, while the latter was allowed to practice in the lower courts in a specific district. The Attorney General was authorised a proctor from each district to serve as the Crown Proctor to instruct or brief crown counsel on civil and criminal cases in district courts, courts of requests and police courts on behalf of the Crown.

=== Australia ===
Proctor is a term that survives in Western Australia and in South Australia. Until it was amended in 1992 and later superseded by the Legal Profession Act in 2008, the Legal Practitioners Act 1893 (WA) provided for legal practitioners in Western Australia to be admitted and entitled to practice as "practitioners". That term was then defined as "a person admitted and entitled to practice as a barrister, solicitor, attorney, and proctor of the Supreme Court of Western Australia, or in any one or more of these capacities". Whilst it was theoretically possible to apply for admission in any of these capacities, as there was no separate qualification for such separate admissions, the standard practice (pre-1992) was for all persons to be admitted as barristers, solicitors, and proctors of the Supreme Court of Western Australia. Many survive today. South Australian legislation still provides as of December 2019 that a person admitted as a Solicitor to the Supreme Court of South Australia is also both a Proctor and an Attorney of that court.

=== United States ===
The American colonies continued the British use of the term proctor in admiralty for attorneys who were admitted to specialized admiralty and patent bars. With the unification of the federal Admiralty Rules with the Federal Rules of Civil Procedure in 1966, attorneys practicing admiralty law before the federal courts ceased to be formally called proctors, though the term remains in unofficial use.

== Ecclesiastical ==
In the context of the Church of England, a proctor represents clergy in convocation. The Lower Houses of the Convocations of Canterbury and York include specially elected proctors (the deans of cathedrals and the Dean of either Jersey or Guernsey) and directly elected proctors (representing beneficed and licensed clergy, clergy with permission to officiate, archdeacons, clergy holding office in a cathedral, religious communities, universities and institutions of theological education).

== Education ==
=== High university official ===
In some universities, a proctor is a high official.

==== University of Cambridge ====
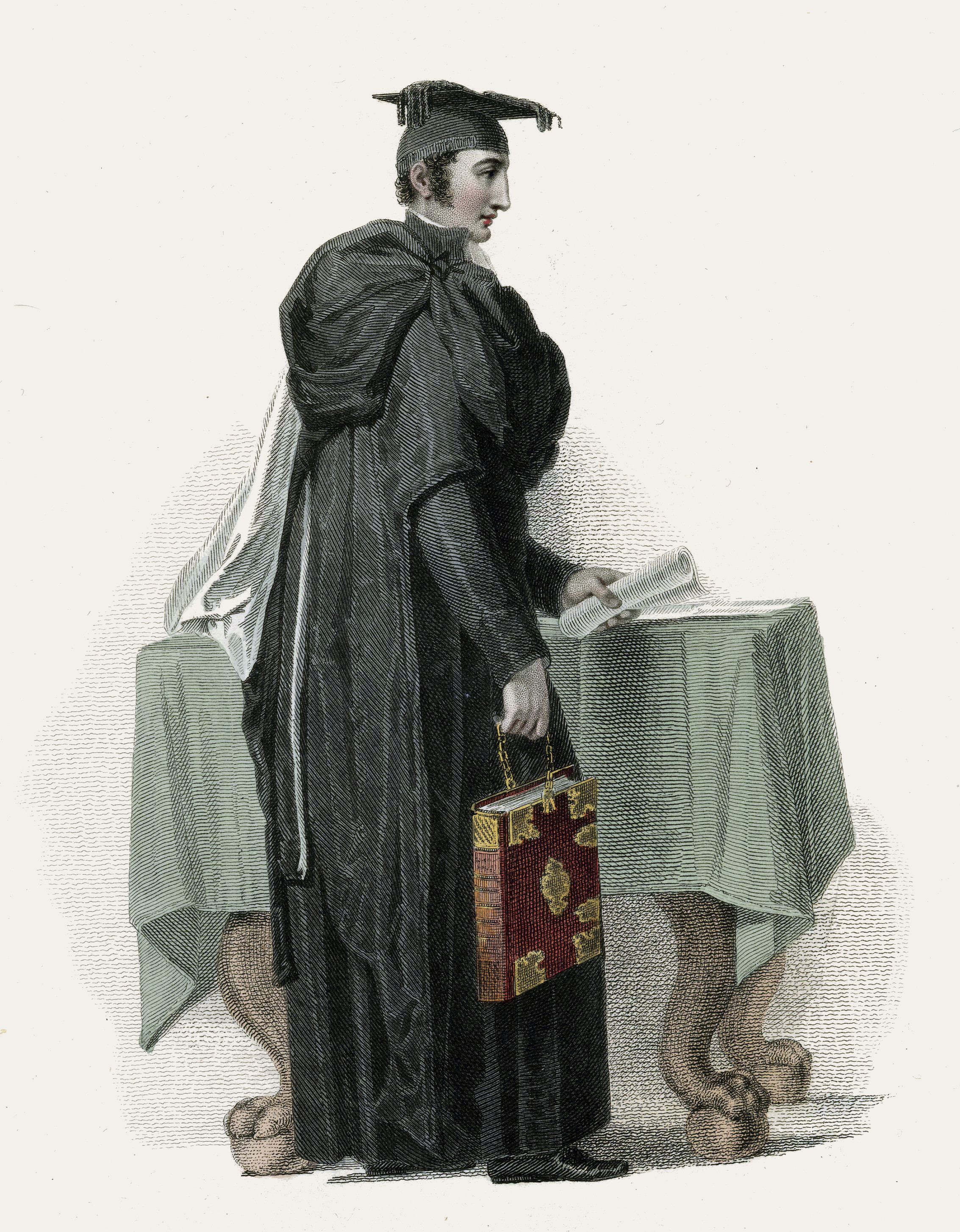
Proctor of the University of Cambridge, aquatint by John Samuel Agar after Thomas Uwins, from History of the University of Cambridge (1815) by William Combe

The early history of the office at Cambridge is obscure, but it seems that the Proctors have always represented the colleges in University proceedings. In the past the Proctors administered the university's finances, acted as examiners for all candidates for the degree of Bachelor of Arts, prosecuted anyone suspected of unfair trading, and had a multitude of other tasks. At present their functions are twofold: (1) taking part in all university ceremonials, and (2) enforcing discipline in the case of members of the university who are in statu pupillari (undergraduates, Bachelors of Arts and Bachelors of Laws).

===== Election =====
At the University of Cambridge, the Proctors are nominated every May by colleges identified in a predetermined cycle. They then serve for one year from 1 October, assisted by their Deputy Proctors and two Pro-Proctors. They must have been a member of the Senate for three years, and must have resided two years at the university. The two Pro-Proctors are not, as at Oxford, nominated by the Proctors, but are also elected by the Regent House on the nomination of the colleges, each college having the right to nominate a Pro-Proctor for the year next before that in which it nominates the Proctor (Grace of 26 February 1863). Two additional Pro-Proctors are also elected by the Senate each year, on the nomination of the Vice-Chancellor and Proctors, to assist the latter in the maintenance of discipline (Grace of 6 June 1878).

The Proctors for 2025–2026 are Dr Martin Parker Dixon (Senior Proctor) of Sidney Sussex College and Dr Benjamin Spagnolo (Junior Proctor) of Trinity College.

The Deputies to the Proctors are Professor Markus Gehring (Deputy to the Senior Proctor) of Hughes Hall and Dr Fraz Mir (Deputy to the Junior Proctor) of King's College.

The Pro-Proctors are Professor Martin Dixon (Senior Pro-Proctor) of Queens' College and Dr Daniel Trocme-Latter (Junior Pro-Proctor) of Homerton College.

The Pro-Proctor for Ceremonial is Mr Timothy Milner of Darwin College.

The Additional Pro-Proctors are Dr Mark Purcell of Pembroke College and Dr Seb Falk of Girton College.

The first hundred years of Proctorial records are mostly lost, but the Proctors' Office web site has a more or less complete list of the Proctors since 1314.

===== Ceremonial functions =====
The Proctors are ex officio members of the Board of Scrutiny, the Board of Examinations, and various other bodies. Their presence is required at all Congregations of the Regent House, at which the Senior Proctor reads all the Graces and the Junior Proctor takes the vote of the Regent House. If any Grace is opposed by any member of the Senate saying non-placet, the Proctors take the votes of those present and announce the result. Graces are offered not only for making changes in University Statutes and Ordinances and for appointing examiners and the like, but also for granting degrees. When a degree is to be taken, the college of the candidate presents a supplicat or petition for the degree; this petition is approved by the Regent House, if and when they have satisfied themselves that the candidate has fulfilled the conditions, and is read at the Congregation by the Senior Proctor: these supplicats are practically never opposed, but Graces for new Statutes and Ordinances are frequently opposed, and on very important occasions such as the election of a new Chancellor many hundreds of non-resident members of the Senate come up to record their votes.

===== Disciplinary functions =====
The proctors' powers as to discipline have a very long history. As far as concerns members of the university they have authority to impose certain fines for minor offences, such as not wearing academic dress on occasions when it is ordered, and also to order a student not to be out of their college after a certain hour for a certain number of days ("gating"). For more serious offences, the proctor generally reports the matter to the authorities of the offender's college to be dealt with by them, or as a last resort brings the offender before the university court of discipline, which has power to rusticate or send down (expel).

The power of the proctors over persons who are not members of the university dates from charters granted by Elizabeth I and James I, which empowered the university authorities to search for undesirable characters, men and women, rogues, vagabonds, and other personas de male suspectas (persons suspected of evil), and punish them by imprisonment or banishment. In recent times this power was often exercised with respect to prostitutes. The proctors promenaded the streets attended by their servants who are always sworn in as special constables. These constables, colloquially known as "Bulldogs", are now members of Cambridge University Constabulary: they retain full police powers of arrest within 5 miles (8 km) of Great St Mary's Church, deemed to be the centre of the university. Proctors no longer have the power of arrest.

If occasion arose, the proctors and their constables could arrest a suspected woman and have her taken to the Spinning House (for which Thomas Hobson the carrier had left an endowment). The next day, the woman would be brought before the vice-chancellor, who had power to commit her to the Spinning House; as a general rule the sentence was for no longer than three weeks. For this purpose the Vice-Chancellor sat in camera and the jurisdiction had nothing to do with that of the vice-chancellor's court. In 1898, attention was called to this procedure by the case of a girl named Daisy Hopkins, who was arrested and committed to the Spinning House. Application was made on her behalf to the Queen's Bench Division for a writ of habeas corpus, and when the application came on it appeared that there had been a technical irregularity (the prisoner not having been formally charged when brought before the Vice-Chancellor); so the writ was granted and the prisoner released. She afterwards brought an action against the proctor, which failed. It was then decided to abolish the practice of hearing these cases in camera. The whole practice was, however, objected to by the authorities of the town, and after a conference an agreement was reached: the proctorial jurisdiction over persons not members of the university was abolished (1904).

Today, the Junior Proctor retains special responsibility for university societies and for resolving disputes arising from the Cambridge Students' Union. The Special Pro-Proctor for Motor Vehicles is responsible for licensing the keeping and using of motor vehicles (other than mopeds) within 10 miles (16 km) of Great St Mary's Church by University students who have not yet reached MA status and are in residence in term or in the Long Vacation period of residence. The Motor Proctor also has the power to impose a fine of up to £175 on students breaching the regulations on the keeping and using of motor vehicles.

==== University of Oxford ====
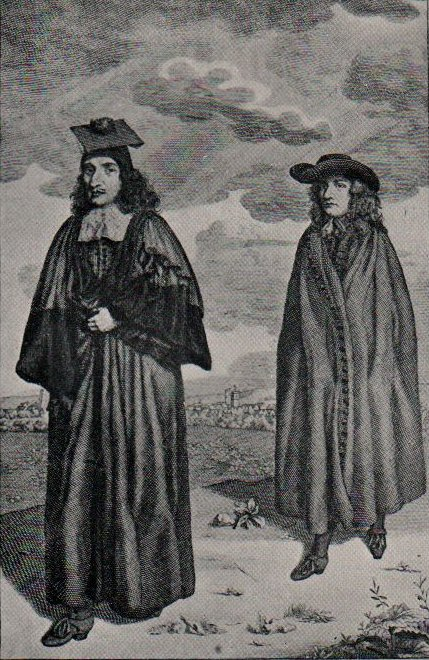
1674 engraving of a Proctor in the University of Oxford. From Habitus Academicorum, by George Edwards

The Proctors of the University of Oxford are senior officers of the university who are responsible for enforcing University discipline and sanctions, for handling complaints against the university, and for conducting public examinations (often at the Examination Schools). They are elected annually by the colleges. Two Proctors are elected each year: a Senior and a Junior Proctor. A chronological list of past Proctors is given in List of University of Oxford Proctors and Assessors.

The reform of the university statutes in 2002 reorganised the disciplinary system of the university and reduced the powers of the Proctors. However, they still act as ombudsmen for the university, and handle formal complaints by and against students (although more minor disciplinary matters are usually dealt with by the Dean of each college). They have the power to issue fines to members of the university for numerous offences, including cheating in examinations.

Prior to 2003, the Proctors were aided in disciplinary matters by the Oxford University Police (who wore bowler hats and were generally known as "Bulldogs"); the University Police were a private constabulary with full powers of arrest within the precincts of the university and within four miles (6 km) of any University building. However, after receiving public criticism in 2002 for their exercise of authority over citizens of Oxford who were not members of the university, the force was disbanded by the University Council in 2003, due partly to the excessive expense of complying with new Government requirements on police training and complaints procedures. Today, the Constables have been redesignated as "Proctors' Officers" and continue to serve under the Proctors, but no longer have the powers of police constables.

=== Examination supervisor ===
In the United States and some other countries, a proctor can be any teacher or other staff member at a university, secondary school, or even elementary school when they are supervising the administration of a test or examination; i.e., the role referred to as an "invigilator" in British, Canadian, Australian and South African English.

==== Online proctoring ====
Online proctoring is the monitoring or invigilation of assessments taken remotely.

Online proctors verify test-taker identity and monitor to prevent cheating using a variety of methods, including live, record-and-review, and automated proctoring. Online proctoring services work with colleges, universities, corporations, and other certification providers to offer identity verification services and assessment monitoring.

Demand for online proctoring has expanded in recent years as a result of rapid expansions in online learning. In 2006, the Department of Education waived the so-called “50 percent rule,” which stipulated that U.S. students in online degree programs could only receive federal student aid if half of their programs were campus-based. As of 2017, one in three students take at least one course online during their college career. In addition, instructors in face-to-face classes can also administer exams online.

Higher education institutions around the world make use of online proctoring for tens of thousands of exams. The 17 campuses of the University of North Carolina proctor between 30,000 and 40,000 exams online per year. At the fully online Western Governors University, 30,000 exams are proctored online each month. Recent estimates suggest that there are about fifteen providers of online proctoring.

==== Research on online proctoring ====
Research suggests that students are equally likely to cheat online as they are in person. However, one study found that nearly three-quarters of college students hold the perception that cheating online is easier than cheating in person. In 2016, USA Today reported on research by Examity which suggests that 6% of students violate rules for proctored online exams. There is clear evidence to that it is easily possible to circumvent e-proctoring software. A scientific test of the Proctorio software at the Dutch University of Twente showed that the software was not able to detect any of the cases of examination fraud it was subjected to. The conclusion was that the sensitivity of Proctorio is disastrous and should be considered at very close to zero.

Some online proctoring providers give colleges and universities access to anonymized, aggregated data on proctoring and cheating rates. These analytics tools allow institutions to measure their violation rates against other schools, as well as to track incidents by time of year and type of course, among other metrics.

== See also ==
- Procurator (Catholic Church)
