= David Wrigley =

British medical doctor (born 1969)

Dr David Wrigley
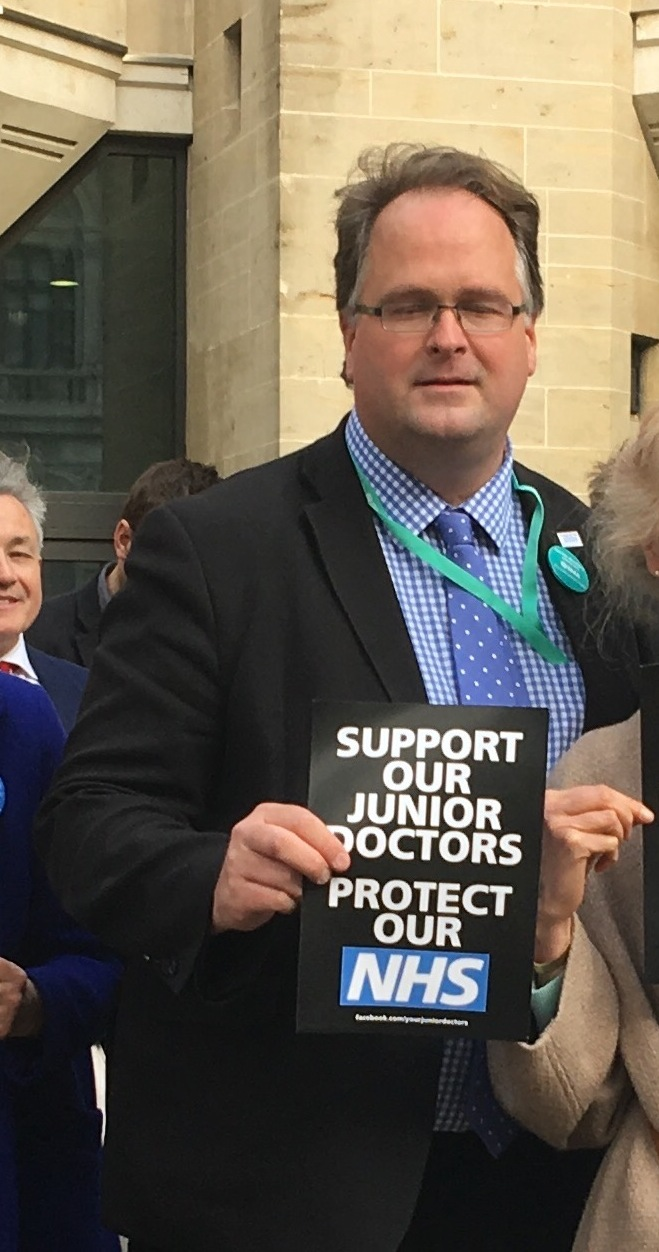
- David Wrigley in 2016.
- Born: 26 August 1969 (age 57); Blackpool, England
- Education: Sheffield Medical School
- Occupation: Doctor - general practitioner
- Years active: 1997–present
- Known for: Deputy Chair of BMA Council
- Medical career
- Profession: Doctor
- Field: General Practitioner
- Website: drdavidwrigley.blogspot.co.uk

David Wrigley is a British medical doctor who works as a general practitioner (GP) in Lancashire and is the deputy chair of the British Medical Association (BMA) Council. He is a member of the Labour Party and Socialist Health Association.

== Early life ==
Wrigley was born in Blackpool. He was educated at St Mary's RC High School, Blackpool, leaving at 15 to work in a high-street bank. Then, at the age of 21, he left Barclays Bank and studied full-time for A-levels. He gained a place at Sheffield Medical School in 1992, graduating with a medical degree in 1997.

== Career ==
He worked as a junior doctor in Oban, Chesterfield and Lancaster before becoming a GP at Ash Trees Surgery in Carnforth where he has worked since 2002.

In 2002, he was elected to the BMA's General Practitioner's Committee (GPC) as a regional representative for Lancashire and Cumbria. The following year he was elected to the Council of the BMA. He became a Trustee of the Cameron Fund (benevolent charity) in 2009, and was Treasurer from 2011-2017. He was an outspoken critic of the Health and Social Care Act 2012.

He lost his seat on BMA council in 2012, but was elected again in April 2014.

He was the chair of Doctors in Unite, also known as the Medical Practitioners' Union from 2015–2018.

He was deputy chair of the Council of the BMA from 2016–2017 and was re-elected deputy chair in August 2018 for a four year period. This included the period of the global COVID pandemic when Wrigley worked on inadequate PPE, poor rollout of vaccines and the mental health burden on doctors working during the pandemic.

He was elected as deputy chair of the BMA GP Committee for England in 2022. He was re-elected for a 3 year term in 2023 and again for another 3 years in 2026. He is the committee officer lead for health IT, digital and data issues and has seen him speak out on any issues around the involvement of Palantir in the NHS with Palantir criticising the BMA and Wrigley for their views.

The Westminster Parliament has brought forward legislation to implement a Single Patient Record. This has led to concerns from the BMA and Wrigley said it could lead to a loss in confidence over the use of confidential patient data.

== Books ==
Wrigley was a contributor to the book NHS SOS: How the NHS Was Betrayed and How We Can Save It, edited by Jacky Davis and Raymond Tallis, published in 2013 by Oneworld Publications (ISBN 9781780743288). The book outlines how the Health & Social Care Act came about due to the failings of politicians, the media and medical leaders in the UK.

He co-authored NHS for Sale with Jacky Davis and John Lister which was published in 2014 by Merlin Press (ISBN 978-0-85036-627-3). The book debunks the myths put about by politicians such as 'the private sector is more efficient than the public sector' or 'we are not privatising the NHS'. It explains how cuts and closures are impacting on the NHS and how politicians have pushed these changes through due to their ideological policies.

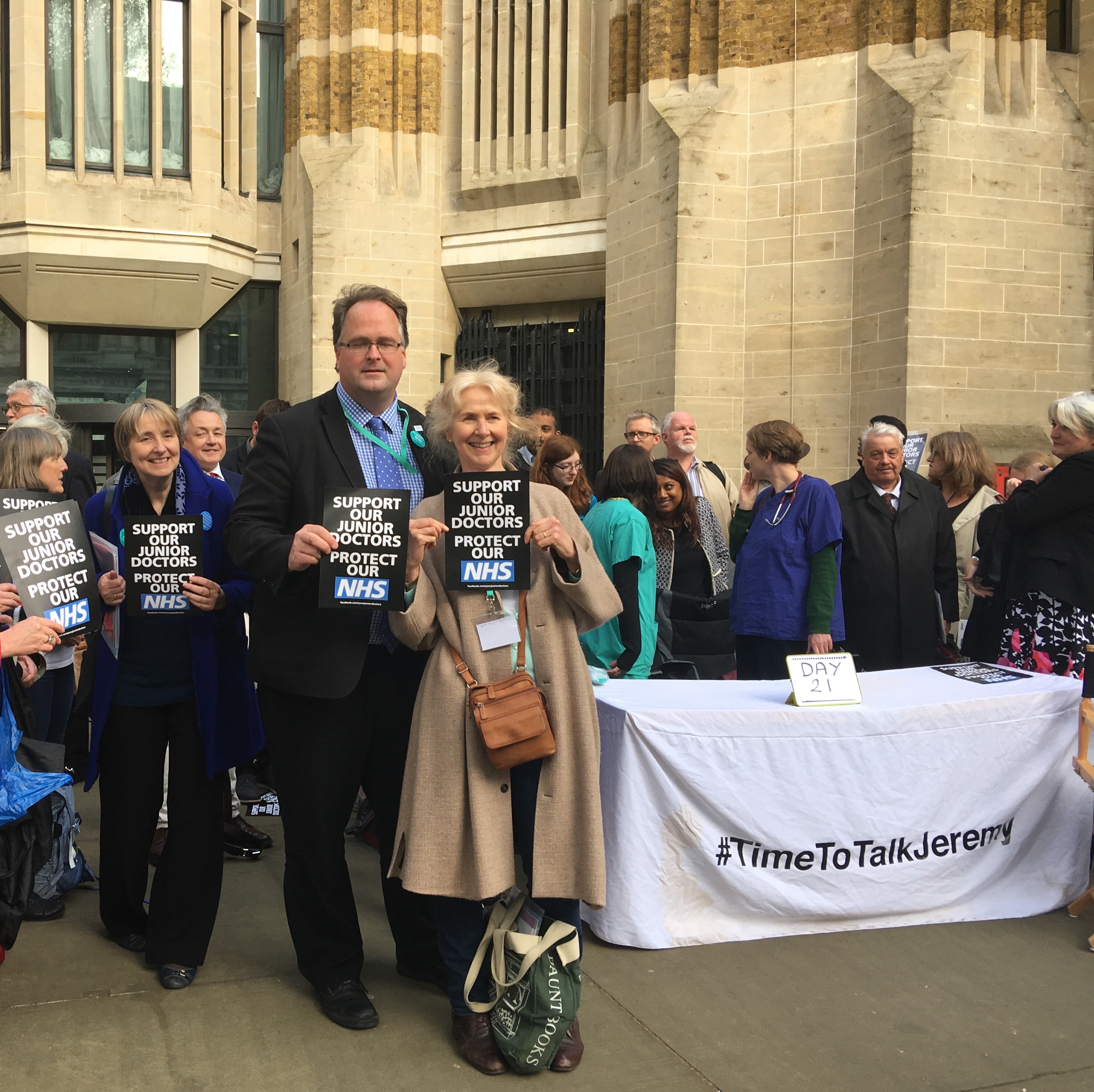
Dr Wrigley & Dr Davis supporting junior doctors outside Dept of Health, London
