= Susan Steinberg (producer) =

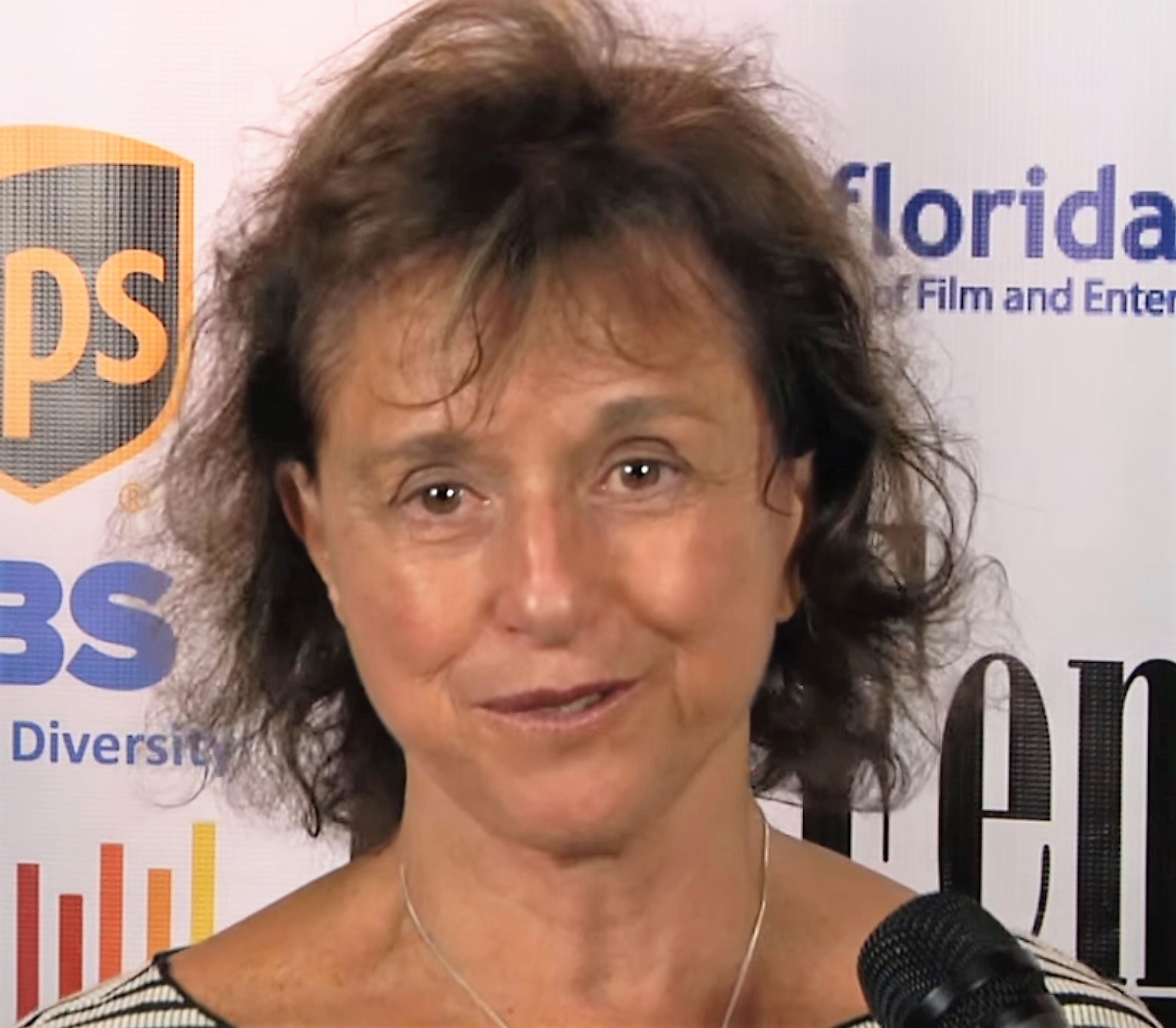
- Steinberg interviewed about her film Mirrors to Windows - The Artist as Woman by The Hollywood Social Lounge in 2015
- Occupation(s): Television/Film producer, writer, and director

Susan Steinberg is an American television producer, writer, and director. She is sometimes credited as Sue Steinberg.

In 1991, she won an Emmy Award. She was born in Chicago.

== Credits ==
=== Producer, director, writer ===
- Edward R. Murrow: This Reporter (1990) for American Masters PBS WNET/13 TV series; Emmy Award, Directors Guild of America Award.
- Paul Simon: Born at the Right Time (1993) for American Masters series.
- Plugging In (1995) - episode of The History of Rock 'n' Roll television series
  - Segment Producer, Writer, and Director for several segments
- Don Hewitt: 90 Minutes on 60 Minutes (1998) for American Masters series
- Atlantic Records: The House That Ahmet Built (2007) for American Masters series
- Under the Knife (2019).

=== Editor: selected ===
- Gimme Shelter (1970) Feature documentary directed by Albert and David Maysles and Charlotte Zwerin
- Cocksucker Blues (1972) Feature documentary directed by Robert Frank on the Rolling Stones
- Rockers (1978), Jamaican reggae film
- Ray Charles: The Genius of Soul (1992) for American Masters PBS WNET/13 TV Series
- W. Eugen Smith: Photography Made Difficult (1998) for American Masters PBS WNET/13 TV Series -Emmy Award

=== Writer ===
- Gold Fever (1997) for American Experience series
- Famous Homes & Hideaways (2004) television series

== Other ==
Steinberg is one of the founding members of The Boston Film/Video Foundation (BF/VF).
