= Under the Knife (film) =

2019 British documentary film

- Film poster
- Directed by: Susan Steinberg
- Produced by: Pamela Kleinot
- Narrated by: Alison Steadman
- Release date: October 2019
- Running time: 90 minutes
- Country: United Kingdom
- Language: English

Under the Knife is a 2019 feature-length documentary film directed by Susan Steinberg, produced by Pamela Kleinot and narrated by actor Alison Steadman. Supported by Britain's Labour Party, health trade unions, and the campaign group Keep Our NHS Public, it argues that England's state-run National Health Service (NHS) is being intentionally privatised and underfunded. Though its premise and conclusions have been disputed, Secretary of State for Health and Social Care, Matt Hancock has stated in Parliament that he considers to be outdated arguments about a split between public and private in healthcare. NHS funding going to private firms escalated during the 2020-21 COVID-19 pandemic.

The film looks at healthcare before the NHS and how this service came to be, followed by what happened over the subsequent seven decades, before presenting its arguments on privatisation, underfunding, the private finance initiative and the impact of the 2012 Health and Social Care Act. More than 60 people are interviewed in the film.

== Synopsis ==
Under the Knife is a 2019 feature-length (90 minutes) documentary film directed by Susan Steinberg, produced by Pamela Kleinot and narrated by actor Alison Steadman.

The film looks at historical archives to show the history of healthcare before the UK's National Health Service (NHS) and how the NHS came to be. It goes through the subsequent seventy years, explaining the effects of the private finance initiative and presenting arguments that the NHS is being intentionally privatised and underfunded. It then focuses on the impact of the Health and Social Care Act, implemented by Andrew Lansley in 2012. In addition, the film reports on a number of campaigns, including the legal challenge against funding cuts to Lewisham Hospital in 2012.

More than 60 people, comprising a number of patients, nurses, politicians and frontline doctors, were interviewed for the film, including:

- Phil Hammond
- Michael Mansfield
- Tony Blair
- Gina Miller
- George Monbiot
- Jacky Davis
- John McDonnell
- Clare Gerada
- Lord Owen
- Frank Dobson
- Allyson Pollock
- Colin Hutchinson

== Endorsements and funding ==
The film is endorsed by director Ken Loach and a number of Labour Party supporters and celebrities.

To produce the film, Pamela Kleinot created a company called Pam K Productions Limited and remortgaged her home to raise funds.

The showings, free to NHS staff, at more than 50 different venues in October 2019 have been hosted by Pam K. Productions, the campaign group Keep Our NHS Public and the Daily Mirror, with additional funds from crowdfunding, the trade union Unison and others.

== Reception ==
In July 2019, a discussion on the film was held with the producer, director and a number of doctors at the Institute of Psychoanalysis.

In September 2019, a review of the film by Andy Cowper in the Health Service Journal described the film as convincing about under-resourcing, citing large staff shortages and a bullying culture from management, but disputed the evidence on privatisation, saying "The NHS has used the private sector to deliver healthcare since its inception. GP services have always been supplied by independent contractors. High street dentistry, pharmacy and ophthalmology are all privately provided, as is much higher-tier mental health provision."

Cowper also commented that "privatisation of NHS-funded healthcare is neither a big problem, nor is it a real one. But it is the central charge of Under the Knife" and argued that the film's claim that private interests wish to take over the NHS, particularly "giant US healthcare companies", is undermined by "extremely questionable assertions" and a lack of knowledge of how the private sector actually works.
