= Jacky Davis =

British radiologist

Jacky Davis is a British radiologist who was appointed a consultant radiologist at Whittington Hospital London in 1981, with special interests in paediatrics, ultrasound and breast imaging.

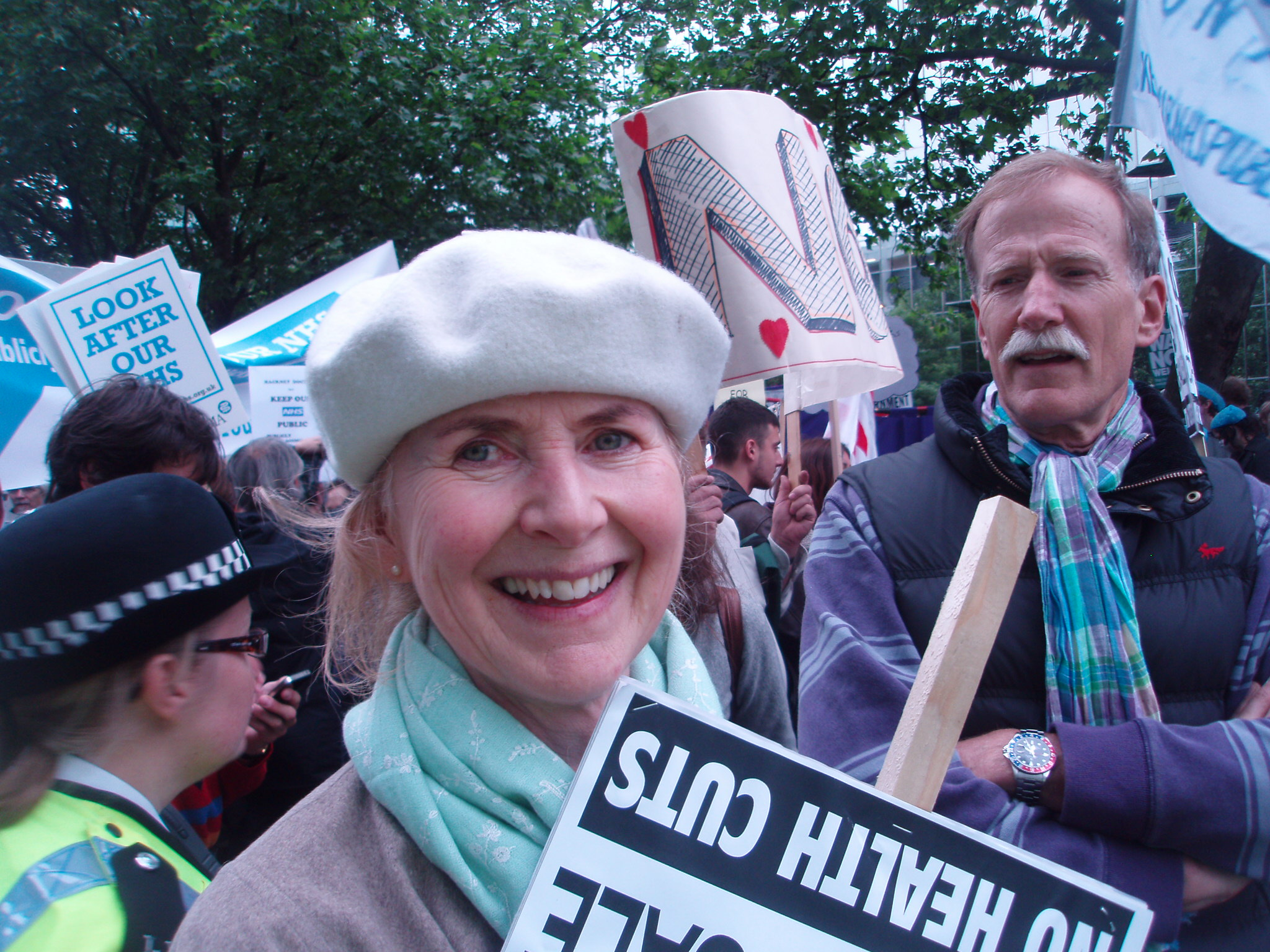
on a demonstration May 2005

She is a member of the British Medical Association (BMA) council, and is a founder member of the national campaign Keep Our NHS Public. She is a campaigner for assisted dying, is on the board of Dignity in Dying and chairs Healthcare Professionals for Assisted Dying.

She was called as a witness by the House of Commons Health Committee enquiry into top–up fees in the NHS in January 2009.

She was very active in the campaign against the Health and Social Care Act 2012. In particular she was vocal in the campaign that complained that the BBC failed to give sufficient exposure to the threat to the NHS.

She co-edited and co-authored with Raymond Tallis the 2013 book NHS SOS: How the NHS Was Betrayed and How We Can Save It, about the passage of Andrew Lansley's infamous Health and Social Care Act. The book blames three groups for allowing the legislation through: the Liberal Democrats in the 2010 Cameron–Clegg coalition government, the leaders of the medical profession, in particular the BMA and the medical royal colleges, and the news media.

She co-authored with David Wrigley and John Lister, the 2015 book NHS For Sale: Myths, Lies and Deception which exposes the myths and debunks the lies told by the Coalition during the passage of the Health and Social Care Act. It takes an evidence-based approach to exposing government claims such as that the new legislation would give power to patients and doctors and would not result in the privatisation of the NHS

In March 2013 she appeared and spoke at the rally against the sale of part of Whittington Hospital. She also spoke at a public meeting about the future of the hospital in September 2013.

== Books ==
- Davis, Jacky; Tallis, Raymond, eds. (2013). NHS SOS: how the NHS was betrayed - and how we can save it. Oneworld. ISBN 9781780743288.
- Davis, Jacky; Lister, John; Wrigley, David (2015). NHS for Sale: Myths, Lies and Deceptions. Merlin Press. ISBN 978-0-85036-627-3.
