= Arundells =

House in Salisbury, Wiltshire, England

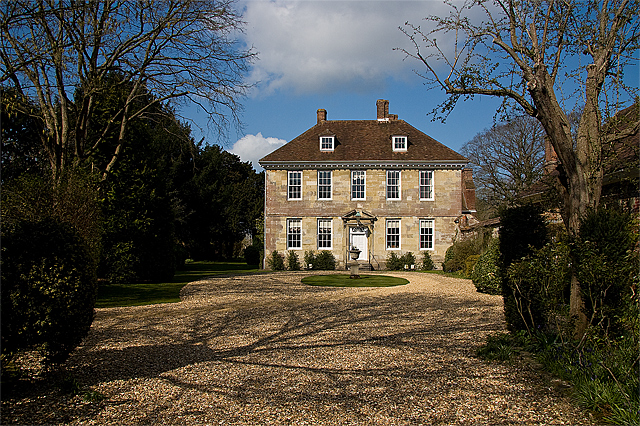
- Front of Arundells from the Close

- Location within Wiltshire
- 51°03′57″N 1°48′00″W
- Location: 59, The Close, Salisbury
- OS grid reference: SU 14116 29644

Site notes
- Area: Wiltshire
- Architectural style: Queen Anne
- Owner: Sir Edward Heath Charitable Foundation

Listed Building – Grade II*
- Official name: Arundells
- Designated: 28 February 1952
- Reference no.: 1254399

Arundells is a Grade II* listed house at 59 Cathedral Close, Salisbury, Wiltshire, England. Located on the West Walk of the Close, next to the 'Wardrobe' (Rifles Museum), it was the home of Edward Heath, the former Prime Minister of the United Kingdom, from 1985 until his death in 2005.

The house and its extensive garden are open to the public five days a week from late March to late October each year.

== History of the house ==
Arundells has its origins as a medieval canonry in the thirteenth century; its first recorded occupant was Henry of Blunston, Archdeacon of Dorset, who was resident from 1291 to 1316. Many other canons lived there up to Leonard Bilson, who was imprisoned in 1571 for practising sorcery and magic. The house was then leased by the Cathedral Chapter to a series of lay tenants, including Sir Richard Mompesson (from 1609) and John Wyndham (1718); the former rebuilt a large part of the property in the classic style of the day. Wyndham gave the house to his daughter, who married the third son, James Everard Arundel, of the sixth Baron Arundell of Wardour in 1752, resulting in the house acquiring its current name.

Arundells housed Godolphin Girls' School and a boys' boarding school at different times in the 19th century, with Godolphin's, which is still located in Salisbury, moving from Arundells after an outbreak of cholera in the city.

During the Second World War, Arundells was used as a book and wool store by the Red Cross. It fell into serious disrepair after the war and the Cathedral Chapter, responsible for the Close, considered demolishing it, before the leasehold was purchased for a token amount by Mr and Mrs Robert Hawkings in 1964, and the property was subsequently renovated. In 1985, at the age of 69, the former British Prime Minister, Sir Edward Heath, bought Arundells, partly because of its proximity to the Solent, where he sailed. He engaged the renowned interior designer, Derek Frost, whose brief was to modernise the house in a contemporary fashion while paying respect to the Queen Anne original.

Frost designed display cabinets to house Heath's many trophies and awards. He also designed a number of custom pieces of furniture for the house that remain there to this day. It was the first time in his life that Heath had owned a property. (He had been Prime Minister from June 1970 to March 1974, and remained a Member of Parliament until 2001, as the Father of the House at Westminster). In 1993, he added the freehold to the lease, purchasing it from Salisbury Cathedral, when the latter was seeking to raise money for its restoration programme. (Heath was an active supporter of the cathedral's 'Spire Appeal'.)

Following Heath's death in July 2005, his estate was bequeathed to the Sir Edward Heath Charitable Foundation, established under his will, with the express purpose of ensuring that the house and its contents could be opened to the public as a place of historic interest.

== Opening to the public ==
The ground-floor rooms at Arundells were opened to the public in 2008 and received about 50,000 visitors in the first six years to 2013 (a figure that has since gone up to around 80,000). In spring 2014, the trustees opened some of the first-floor rooms for the first time, including Heath's study, where he worked at a desk which originally belonged to an earlier Prime Minister, David Lloyd George. The exhibits on the first floor now include political and other memorabilia, such as Heath's ministerial boxes and personal banner from the Order of the Garter. The staircase is decorated by hand-painted Chinese wallpaper depicting classic legends. Heath's former political secretary, Douglas Hurd, was guest of honour at the formal opening of the study in summer 2014.

The former Labour cabinet minister, Tony Benn, was – despite his left-wing political views – a close friend of Heath and an early supporter of efforts to ensure the permanent opening of the house, saying "I know the house, I knew Ted ... and visited him there after he retired from politics.” Subsequently, a number of political figures of all parties – including Geoffrey Howe, David Hunt, Kenneth Clarke, Peter Mandelson, Hilary Benn, Charles Kennedy and Alan Beith, as well as Douglas Hurd – expressed strong public support for the house being permanently open to the public, including the necessary planning permissions for this purpose.

The former Labour Chancellor and Home Secretary, Roy Jenkins, who was a lifelong friend of Heath, dating from their time together as students at Balliol College, Oxford, is said to have looked out towards Salisbury Cathedral from the front guest bedroom on the first floor of Arundells and remarked that the view was one of the ten finest in the country, to which Heath replied: "Why, what are the other nine?"

Arundells is open to the public five days a week from late March to early November each year, being closed on Wednesdays and Thursdays. In addition to its public opening days, the property regularly hosts private events, including recitals and seminars.

== Arundells' art and other collections ==
The house contains a collection of artefacts reflecting Heath's time in public life, his passion for art, and his achievements in music and sailing. There is a large range of paintings, drawings, prints, European and Oriental ceramics, sailing memorabilia and political mementos, including:

- An art collection, including paintings by Churchill, Lowry, Sickert and John, and a selection of Japanese woodblock prints (see below);
- An 8th-century Tang dynasty horse, a 16th-century Ming bowl, and a pair of vases from the Qianlong dynasty, given to Heath by Chairman Mao Zedong;
- Heath's Steinway piano and other musical possessions and mementos;
- Heath's yachting memorabilia, including nautical paintings, photographs and models of the five Morning Cloud yachts that Heath raced during his lifetime;
- Original political cartoons by Giles, Jak, Low, Garland, Vicky, Trog and Cummings, on topics such as Heath's political rivalries, Britain's entry into the European Community in 1973, Conservative divisions over Europe, and his 1990 visit to Iraq, where he negotiated the release of Britons taken hostage as a 'human shield'.

Among the paintings and prints by over 20 artists on display are Yachts at Sea by L. S. Lowry; Between Aix and Arles and The Woods at Mimizan by Sir Winston Churchill, both given to Heath by the artist in the 1950s, one of them unique in being signed 'WSC' twice; a series of scenes by John Piper, including two views of Arundells; three paintings by John Singer Sargent; one each by Augustus John, Walter Sickert and Ken Howard, and a collection of Japanese woodblock prints by Utamaro and Hiroshi Yoshida, including the latter's 'Inland Sea series', six seascapes of the same scene at different times in the day. A painting of Heath's home-town of Broadstairs in Kent by Robert Ponsonby-Staples was given to him by the Poet Laureate Sir John Betjeman.

== Charitable trust ==
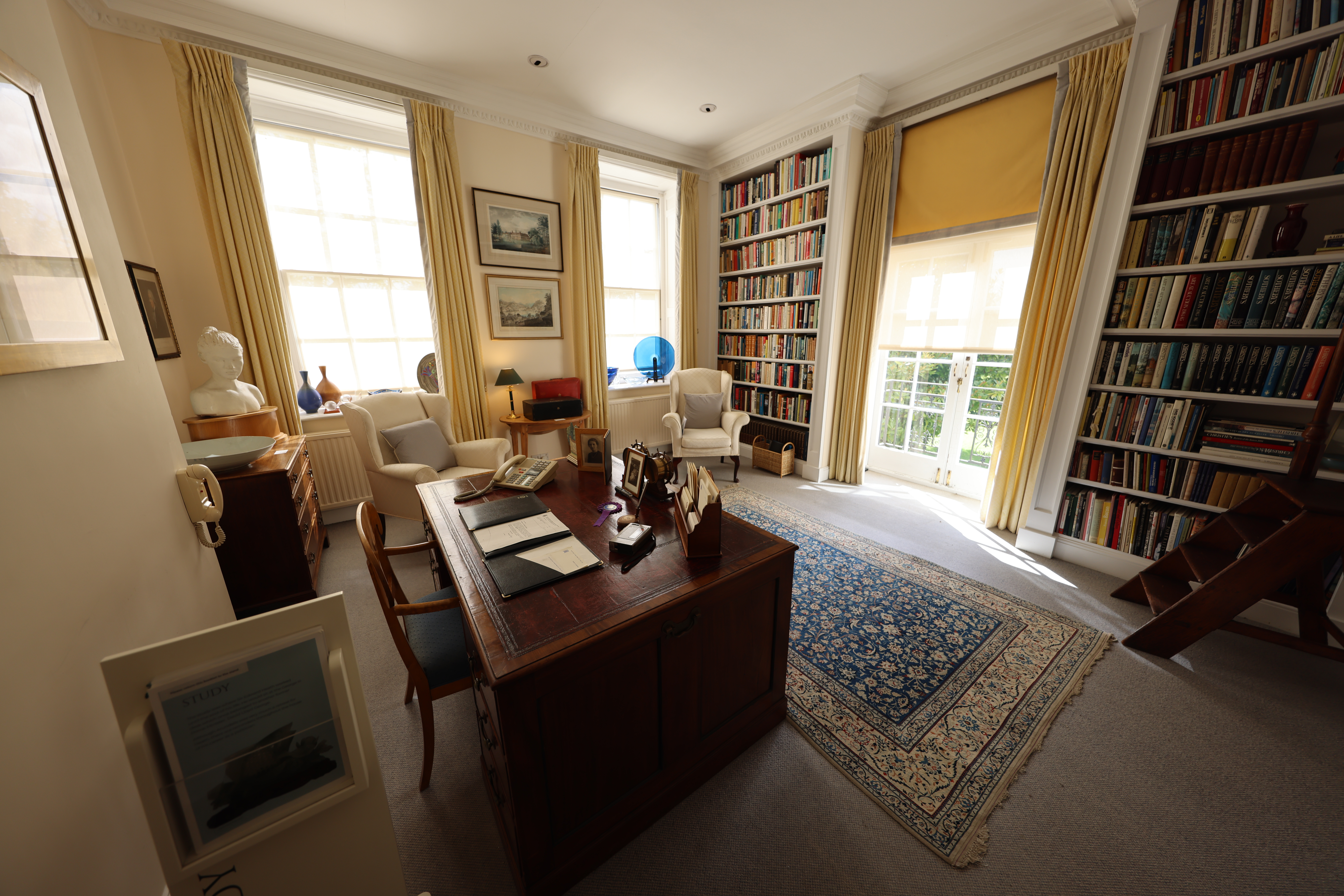
Edward Heath's study

Arundells is owned and managed by the Sir Edward Heath Charitable Foundation, a charity established under Heath's will, whose honorary chairman is currently John MacGregor, who served as Heath's political secretary in the 1960s and as Cabinet minister under both Margaret Thatcher and John Major. Major in turn serves as president of the Foundation's fund-raising campaign. Previous chairmen include Robert Armstrong, the former Cabinet Secretary, and David Hunt, also a Cabinet minister under Major.

When Heath died in 2005, his estate was valued at £5 million and the Foundation opened Arundells to the public in 2008, initially for a three-year period, under planning permission at the time. Although the property has since received around 80,000 visitors, the trustees initially found it difficult to make the property self-financing, as they wished, and concluded in September 2010 that they would prefer to sell the house and its contents, at the end of the three-year period, and to allocate the proceeds to other charitable causes, notably music, rather than continue with existing arrangements. However, opposition from local supporters of the house, organized by the 'Friends of Arundells' led by Tony Burnside, prompted the Charity Commission to rule in September 2011 that any sale would be premature, with the Foundation asked to make more vigorous efforts to meet the central objective of Heath's will. The then trustees continued to argue for a sale, and although they opened the property for the 2012 season, they announced their continued wish to sell it thereafter, if the Charity Commission would permit them to do so.

The developing impasse was broken in December 2012, when a group of former political advisers to Heath and to other leading Conservative figures (from the Heath, Thatcher and Major governments), led by Heath's former political secretary in the 1980s, Peter Batey, intervened in the dispute to offer a compromise. Under this, funding would be provided to cover any operating deficit in the near-term, whilst improvements in the management of the property were undertaken, planning permission was secured from Wiltshire Council to allow the house and garden to be open on a permanent basis (rather than on a three-year rolling basis), and a longer-term fund-raising process was undertaken to guarantee the fabric of the property and allow Arundells to become a centre for charitable activity related to Heath's interests. (The issue of planning permission was important because the Cathedral Chapter objected to it, claiming that the continued opening of the house "might change the character of the area" by "reinforcing the element of commerciality", but their objections were overruled by Wiltshire Council).

The Batey proposal was accepted by the Foundation in November 2013, with a view to Arundells remaining permanently open to the public, and Batey was appointed as a trustee. With permanent planning permission granted soon thereafter, some of the first-floor rooms of the house, including Heath's study, were opened to the public in 2014. The Foundation began to undertake a series of lectures, seminars and exhibitions at the house and elsewhere in Salisbury, including talks by leading political and yachting personalities. Exhibitions have so far included images of 1965 as a year in British politics and culture; leading statesmen and women of the 1970s; Heath and Europe; Heath and Music, Sailing, and Heath: The Soldier. The house now contains a permanent exhibition about Heath's military career, and information about the history of the house before his tenure.

The Arundells website, maintained by the Foundation, includes a selection of video and audio links relating to Heath's life and career, including the 2011 BBC television documentary, 'Wilson versus Heath: The Ten-Year Duel', which traces the defining political rivalry between the leaders of the two main British political parties which ran between July 1965 and February 1975.
