= Ruth Railton =

British music director and conductor (1915 - 2001)

Dame Ruth Railton DBE
- Born: 14 December 1915; Folkestone, Kent, England
- Died: 23 February 2001 (aged 85); London, England
- Education: St Mary's School, Wantage; Royal Academy of Music
- Occupation: Music director
- Spouse: Cecil Harmsworth King
- Parent(s): David Railton; Ruby Marion Wilson

Dame Ruth Railton DBE (14 December 1915 – 23 February 2001) was a British music director and conductor.

After St. Mary's School, Wantage, and the Royal Academy of Music, she became director of music or choral work for several schools including St. Catherine’s, Bramley. She founded the National Youth Orchestra of Great Britain in 1948. She was an adjudicator of the Federation of Music Festivals from 1946-74. She was created a Dame Commander of the Order of the British Empire in 1966.

She was one of four daughters and one son, David, born to the Rev David Railton, the son of George Scott Railton, who was second in command of William and Catherine Booth's Salvation Army. In 1962, she married Cecil Harmsworth King; he died in 1987 at their home in Dublin, where they had relocated.

After his death, she became patron of the Cecil King Award for the Young Manager of the Year, promoted jointly by the Irish Management Institute, the Institute of Management in Northern Ireland and The Irish Times.
