= Peter Batey =

British businessman (born 1958)

- Born: 1 July 1958 (age 68)
- Occupations: Chairman, Vermilion Partners Ltd Vice Chairman, China Britain Business Council
- Title: Peter Batey, CMG, OBE

Peter Batey (贝彼德) CMG OBE (born 1 July 1958) is a retired British businessman who spent much of his professional life working in China. He was Chairman and co-founder of Vermilion Partners Ltd, a merger and acquisitions and strategic advisory firm focused on China. Batey has served with numerous organisations promoting business ties between China and the UK - notably the China Britain Business Council - receiving an OBE for services to Sino-British investment and trade in 1997, and a CMG for services to UK-China relations in 2015.

== Biography ==
=== Education and early life ===
Batey was educated at Dame Allan's Boys School, Newcastle upon Tyne, from 1970 to 1976. He went on to study Philosophy, Politics and Economics (PPE) at Keble College, Oxford. He took a sabbatical year in 1979 to undertake the role of President of the Oxford University Student Union, before graduating in 1981. Following graduation, he joined Citibank NA as an executive trainee. From 1982 to 1986, he was political private secretary to the Rt. Hon. Sir Edward Heath, KG, MBE, who as Prime Minister had restored diplomatic relations between the United Kingdom and China.

=== Career ===
Batey moved to Beijing in 1986 as a representative of Arthur Andersen, subsequently becoming Chief Representative for China. In 1989 he and Richard Burn co-founded Batey Burn, a China-focused investment advisory and government relations business.

In 1999 Batey became Chairman of APCO Asia Ltd after APCO acquired Batey Burn. Batey left APCO Asia Ltd in 2004 and co-founded Vermilion Partners Ltd, where he then served as Chairman (https://www.vermilion-partners.com/)

He was a director of Shuijingfang, a public company listed on the Shanghai Stock Exchange as a nominee of Diageo Plc from 2007-2013, and serves as a director of a number of foreign-invested enterprises in China.

Batey has served in numerous roles in organisations focused on the development of business and political ties between China, and the UK and Europe, including: Chairman of the British Chamber of Commerce in China (1994–1996), Vice President and President of the European Union Chamber of Commerce in China, which he helped to establish, from 1999 to 2002, Senior Advisor to the Lord Mayor and Corporation of the City of London (2006–2008), as well as Chairman of the Great Britain China Centre (2004 – 2014); Since 2012 he has been Vice Chairman and Chairman of the Nominations Committee of the China Britain Business Council, having previously served as a member of the Board and the Executive Committee (2001 – present).

=== Later life ===
In recent years, Peter Batey has played a central role in saving 'Arundells', Sir Edward Heath's home (from 1985 to 2005) in the Cathedral Close, Salisbury, helping to spearhead the campaign to keep it open to the public in perpetuity. He is currently Executive Chairman of the Sir Edward Heath Charitable Foundation, the charity which owns Arundells and whose Honorary Chairman is Gyles Brandreth and whose Honorary President is Sir John Major.

=== Awards ===
Batey was awarded the Order of the British Empire (OBE) for services to Sino-British investment and trade in the Queen’s Birthday Honours List in June 1997, and became a Companion of the Order of St Michael and St George (CMG) in the 2015 Birthday Honours for services to Sino-British relations.
