= Sally Coulthard =

English non-fiction book author

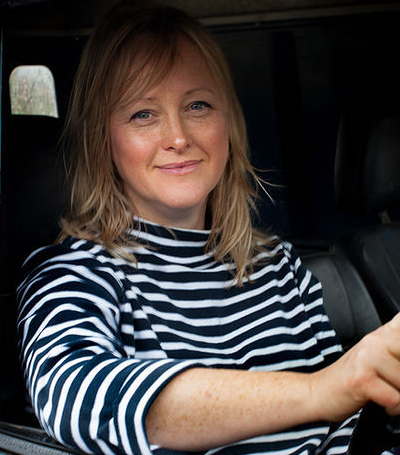
- Coulthard in 2021
- Born: 3 September 1974 (age 52); Calverley, West Yorkshire, England
- Education: Keble College, Oxford
- Years active: –present
- Spouse: James Gordon-Finlayson
- Children: 3
- Website: www.sallycoulthard.co.uk

Sally Coulthard (born 3 September 1974) is an English non-fiction author, who has published over thirty books in the areas of nature, craft, rural life and social history. Topics range from folklore, farm animals, wildlife and rural buildings, to A Brief History of the Countryside in 100 Objects, which was a Waterstones Best Book of 2024 for Nature Writing. She connects the histories of cooking, plants, animals, people and businesses with literature, folklore, and mythology using a "warmly wry narrative voice" according to the Times Literary Supplement. For Fowl Play: A History of Chicken from Dinosaur to Dinner Plate, Coulthard was complimented on the quality of her research into complex issues with real consequences. Through her books and her column in Country Living, Coulthard also gives practical advice on topics like 50 ways to help save the bees and the use of cold frames.

== Early life ==
Sally Coulthard was born September 1974 and raised in Calverley, a village in West Yorkshire. After studying Archaeology & Anthropology at Keble College, Oxford, she worked in television production for a number of years before moving back to Yorkshire to become a writer.

== Career ==
Coulthard has published more than thirty non-fiction books on nature, rural life and history, and craft. She is represented by Graham Maw Christie literary agents. Coulthard is also a columnist for Country Living magazine and Yorkshire Life magazine.

== Personal life ==
Coulthard lives on a smallholding in the Howardian Hills, North Yorkshire with her husband James Gordon-Finlayson and their three daughters.

== Bibliography ==
- 2026: A Brief History of the Coast in 100 Objects (HarperNorth)
- 2026: The Secret World of Twilight (Apollo)
- 2025: The Apple: A Delicious History (Apollo)
- 2024: A Brief History of the Countryside in 100 Objects (HarperNorth)
- 2024: The Book of the Frog (Apollo)
- 2024: The Wildlife Year (Quadrille Publishing)
- 2022: Fowl Play: A History of the Chicken from Dinosaur to Dinner Plate (Head of Zeus)
- 2021: Floriography: The Myth, Magic and Language of Flowers (Quadrille)
- 2021: The Barn: The Lives, Landscape and Lost Ways of an Old Yorkshire Farm (Head of Zeus)
- 2021: The Book of the Earthworm (Head of Zeus, 2021)
- 2021: 50 ways to help save the bees (The Countryman Press, 2021)
- 2020: A Short History of the World According to Sheep (Head of Zeus, 2020)
- 2020: Biophilia: You + Nature + Home (Quadrille, 2020)
- 2019: The Bee Bible (Head of Zeus, 2021)
- 2019: Superstition: The History of Common Folk Beliefs (Quadrille, 2019)
- 2019: Crafted: A Compendium of Craft, Artisans and the Culture of Making (Quadrille, 2019)
- 2019: The Hedgehog Handbook (Head of Zeus, 2019)
- 2018: Little Book of Snow (Head of Zeus, 2018)
- 2018: How to Build a Shed (Laurence King, 2018)
- 2017: The Little Book of Building Fires (Head of Zeus, 2017)
- 2017: Studio: Creative Spaces for Creative People (Jacqui Small LLP, 2017)
