= David Railton =

English clergyman and military chaplain (1884–1955)

- Railton in 1918
- Born: 13 November 1884; Stoke Newington, London, England
- Died: 30 June 1955 (aged 70); Fort William, Scotland
- Education: Keble College, Oxford; Bishop's Hostel, Liverpool
- Occupations: Clergyman, Military chaplain
- Spouse: Ruby Marion Wilson
- Children: 5, including Dame Ruth Railton
- Parent(s): George Scott Railton; Marianne Deborah Lydia Ellen Parkyn

The Reverend David Railton MC (13 November 1884 – 30 June 1955) was a Church of England clergyman, a military chaplain and the originator of the idea of the Tomb of The Unknown Warrior in Britain.

== Early life ==
David Railton was born on 13 November 1884 in Stoke Newington, London. He was the son of George Scott Railton, the first Commissioner of The Salvation Army and second-in-command to its Founder General William Booth, and his wife, Marianne Deborah Lydia Ellen Parkyn. Although he saw little of his father, Railton shared his faith and concern for the poorest in society.

He was educated at The King's School, Macclesfield, and at Keble College, Oxford, where he matriculated in 1904 and obtained his BA degree in 1908. He later studied at Bishop's Hostel in Liverpool. Having joined the Church of England he was ordained in Liverpool in 1908 and took up the curacy of Edge Hill there.

== First World War ==
In 1910, he moved to Ashford, Kent, and the following year became temporary chaplain to the Forces. He was curate of Folkestone from 1914 to 1920, but took a leave of absence to serve in France. He was awarded the Military Cross in 1916 for saving an officer and two men under heavy fire.

On 9 July 1917, he gave pastoral support to Denis Blakemore of the North Staffordshire Regiment at his execution for desertion, a duty he found deeply distressing.

Railton first had the idea of arranging for the body of an unknown serviceman to be brought back to England and buried with full honours in 1916, while he was serving on the Western Front during the First World War. Later in the war, he wrote to Sir Douglas Haig expressing this idea. He received no response but remained reluctant to abdandon it.

== The Unknown Warrior ==
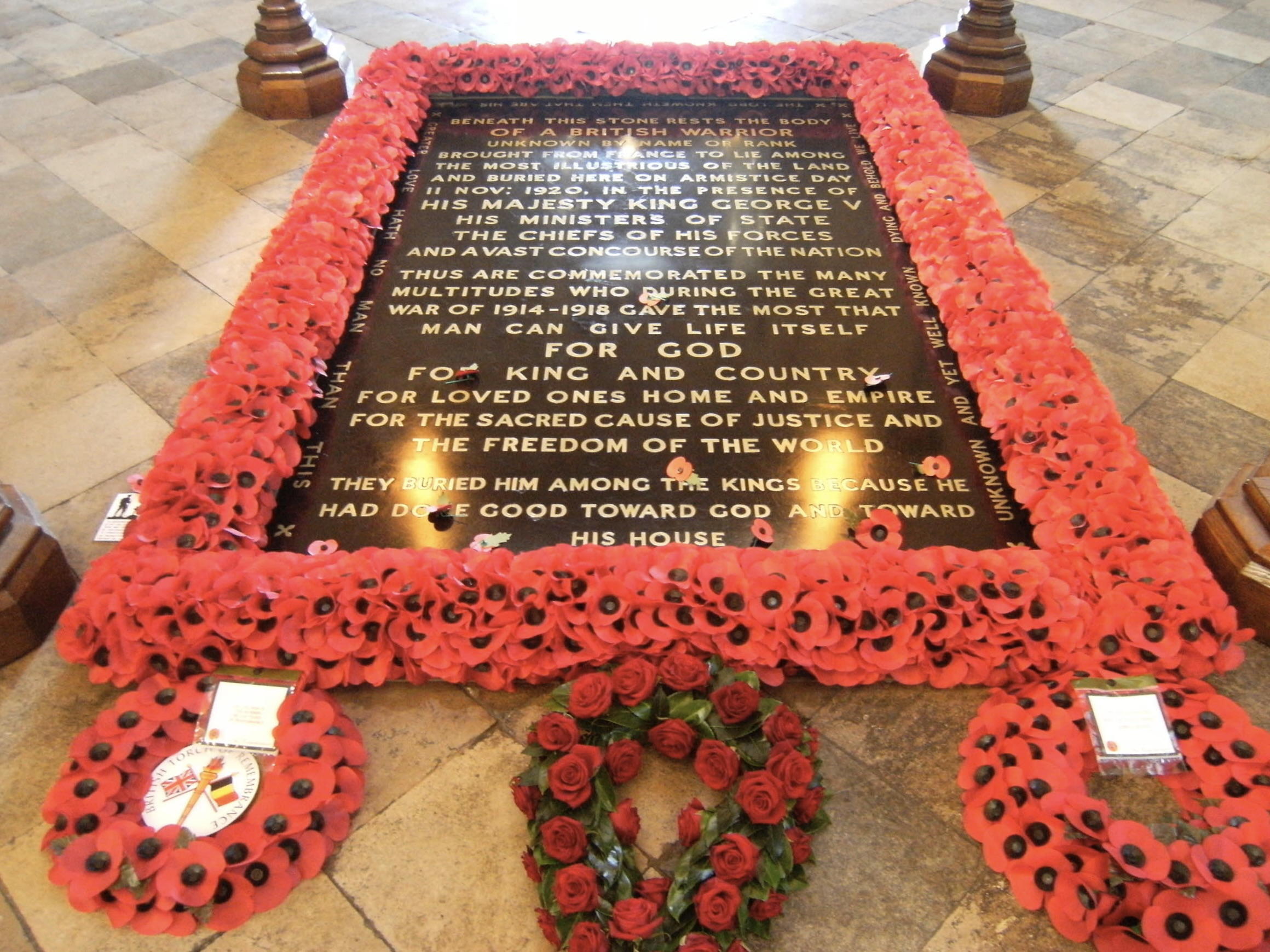
The Tomb of The Unknown Warrior in Westminster Abbey

After the war, Railton became vicar of St John the Baptist Church at Margate, but he still hoped to impress the authorities with his idea. In August 1920, he wrote to Bishop Ryle, the Dean of Westminster, about the possibility of giving an unidentified soldier a national burial service in Westminster Abbey. Ryle took up the idea and his and Lloyd George's enthusiasm won over the initially hesitant King George V.

In October 1920, Railton heard that his idea had been accepted by the Government. A committee headed by Lord Curzon, the then Foreign Secretary, was arranging for an unknown "warrior" to be disinterred in France and brought to Westminster Abbey. On 7 November 1920, six (or, according to other accounts, four), working parties visited the battlefields of Ypres, the Marne, Cambrai, Arras, the Somme, and the Aisne, where units of the Royal Naval division as well as the Army had died: each party exhumed an unidentified body which was examined to ensure that it was British before being placed in a plain coffin.

At midnight, one of these coffins was chosen by Brigadier General L. J. Wyatt, General Officer Commanding troops in France and Flanders, and thus became the official "Unknown Warrior", placed in a new coffin bearing the inscription "A British Warrior who fell in the Great War 1914–1918 for King and Country".

In 1916, Railton was an experienced and mature man in his thirties and was appalled at the sufferings and loss caused by the War. He later tried to explain why he had felt it was so important to commemorate the individual in this way. He recalled an incident near Armentières where he came across a grave with a rough wooden cross inscribed "An unknown British soldier, of the Black Watch":

How that grave caused me to think!... But, who was he, and who were they [his folk]?... Was he just a laddie... . There was no answer to those questions, nor has there ever been yet. So I thought and thought and wrestled in thought. What can I do to ease the pain of father, mother, brother, sister, sweetheart, wife and friend? Quietly and gradually there came out of the mist of thought this answer clear and strong, "Let this body – this symbol of him – be carried reverently over the sea to his native land". And I was happy for about five or ten minutes.

The Union flag which Padre Railton had used to cover bodies at battle field burials and as an makeshift communion alter cloth, prior to the execution of Denis Blakemore, covered the coffin of the unknown warrior at his 1920 burial in Westminster Abbey and again at the centenary service in 2020.

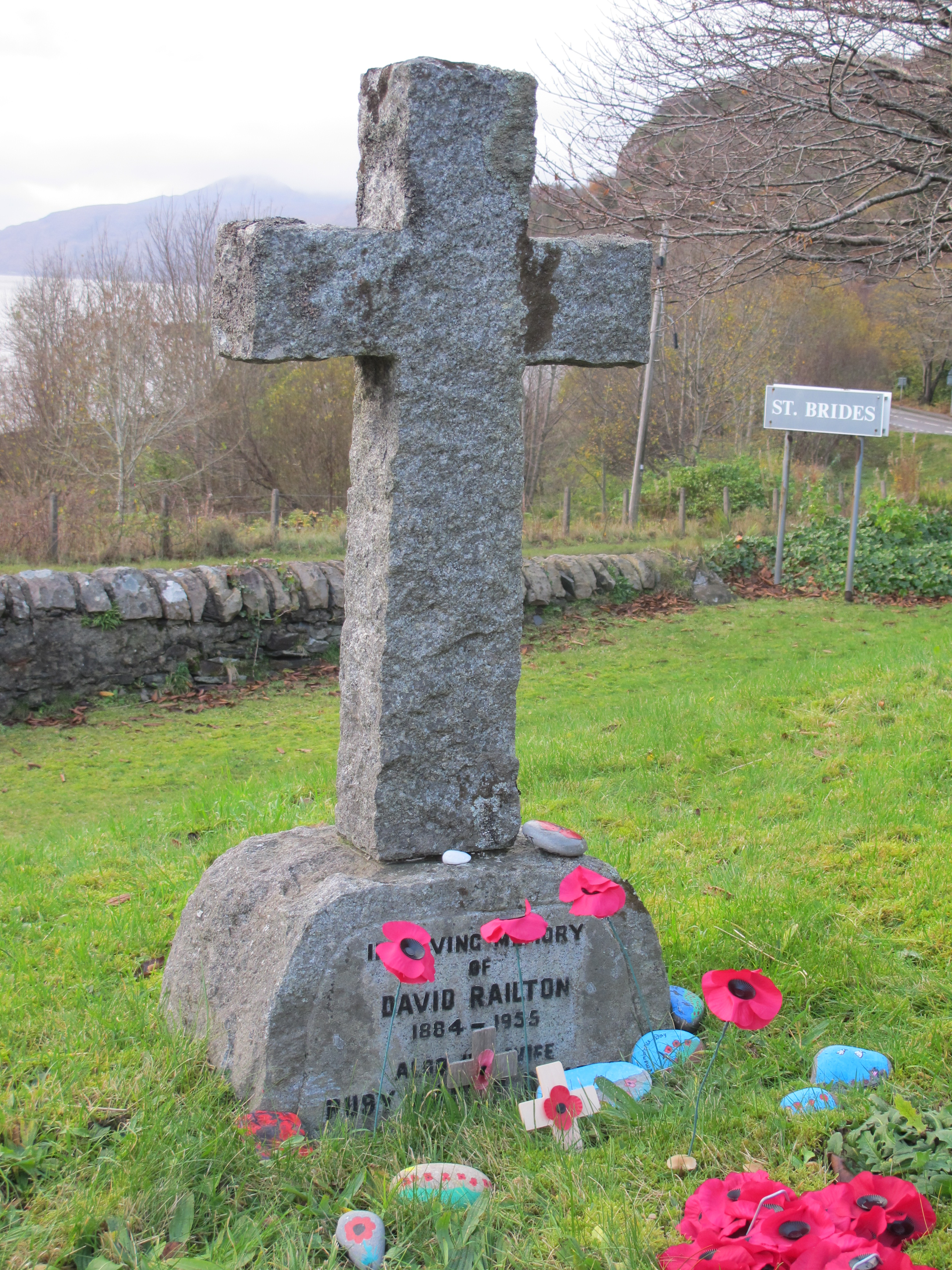
Grave of the Rev David Railton, St Bride's Churchyard, North Ballachulish, Highland Regions, shortly after Armistice Day, 2020

== Later years and death ==
After the war Railton returned briefly to Folkestone before being successively vicar of St John the Baptist, Margate (1920–25), curate of Christ Church, Westminster, vicar of St James's, Bolton, Bradford, Yorkshire, vicar of Shalford, near Guildford (1931–35), rector of St Nicholas's, Liverpool, and archbishop's visitor to the RAF (1943–45) before his retirement in 1945.

In addition, he worked with the Revd Geoffrey Anketell Studdert Kennedy (better-known as the First World War padre poet "Woodbine Willie") for the Church of England's Industrial Christian Fellowship, among workers at their places of work.

"Padre" Railton made his home in retirement at Ard Rhu, Onich, Inverness-shire, and was returning there on 30 June 1955 from Battle, Sussex, where he had been helping the Rural Dean, when he accidentally fell from a moving train at Fort William railway station and died from his injuries. He was survived by his widow, one son, and four daughters. Dame Ruth Railton, the founder of the National Youth Orchestra of Great Britain, was one of his daughters.
