= George Scott Railton =

Scottish Christian missioner (1849–1913)

- Commissioner George Scott Railton
- Born: 6 July 1849; Arbroath, Scotland
- Died: 13 July 1913 (aged 64)
- Education: Woodhouse Grove School, Leeds
- Occupation: Commissioner of The Salvation Army
- Spouse: Marianne Deborah Lydia Ellen Parkyn
- Children: David Railton
- Parent(s): Lancelot Railton & Margaret Scott

George Scott Railton (6 July 1849 – 19 July 1913) was a Scottish-born Christian missioner who was the first Commissioner of The Salvation Army.

== Early life ==
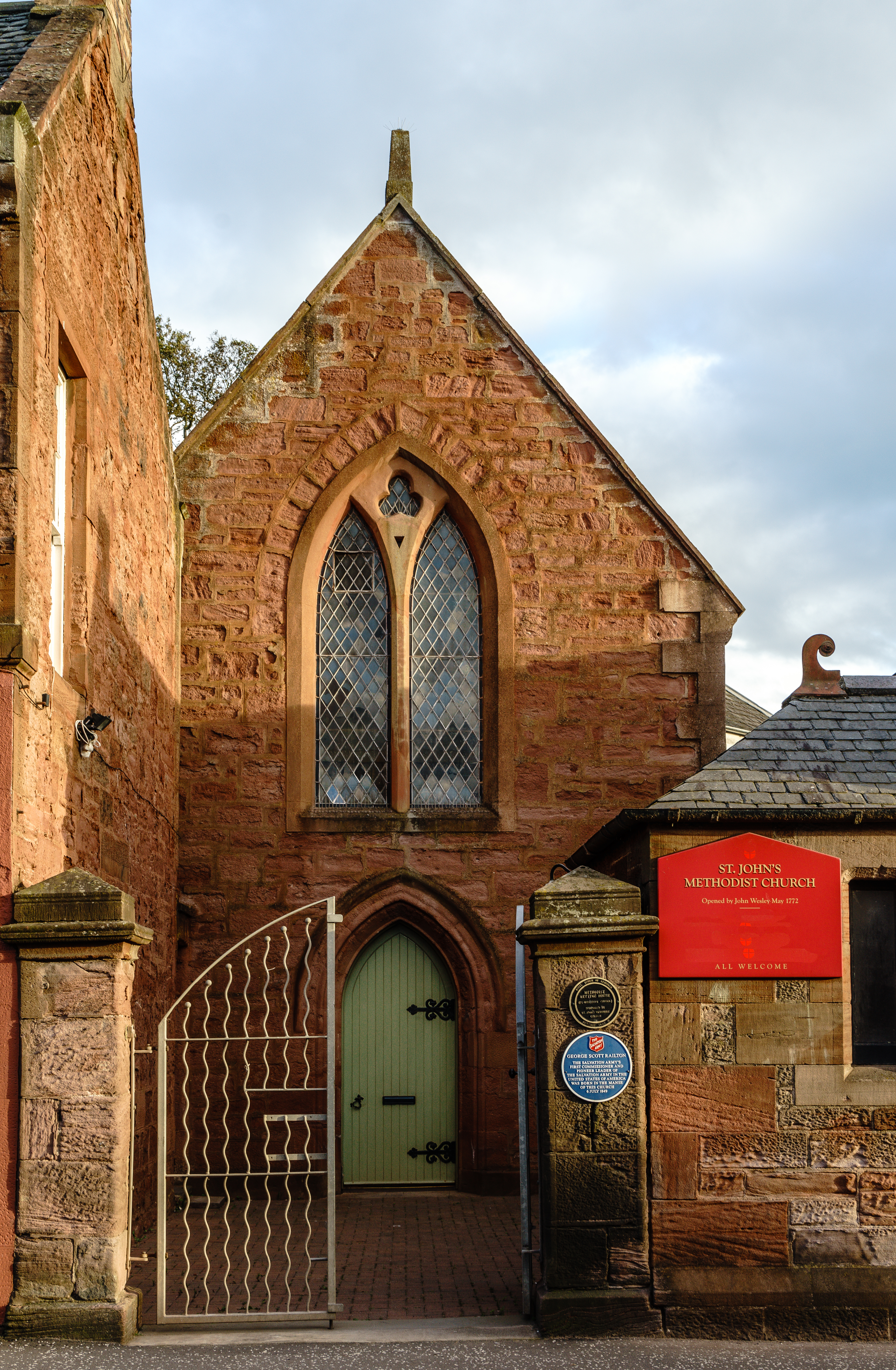
A blue plaque marks his birthplace in Arbroath

Born in the manse of St. John's Methodist Church at Arbroath in Scotland, he was the son of Methodist missionaries Lancelot Railton and his wife, Margaret Scott. Railton was educated at Woodhouse Grove School in Leeds, which was established to provide an education for the sons of itinerant ministers of the Wesleyan Methodist Church. His father and mother both died on 8 November 1864 at Peel, Isle of Man, probably of cholera.

The death of his parents left the 15-year-old Railton homeless and unemployed. His older brother, the Rev. Launcelot Railton, a Methodist minister, found him work in London with a shipping company, but not finding it to his liking Railton decided to go to Morocco in 1869 as a Christian missionary. However, this being unsuccessful and finding himself stranded in Morocco, he had to work his passage back to Britain as a steward. In 1870 he began to work in Stockton-on-Tees for an uncle who owned a shipping business, but preached the Gospel at every available opportunity. In the same year William Booth went to Matlock to recuperate and where he met the Rev. Launcelot Railton, who told Booth of his younger brother George's attempt to convert the Moroccans, adding that George was just the sort of person that Booth's Christian Mission was looking for.

Two years later, in 1872, Booth received a letter from George Scott Railton, who had read a copy of The Christian Mission's second report, "How to Reach the Masses with the Gospel", and had been so moved by it that he offered himself to the cause.

== The Salvation Army ==
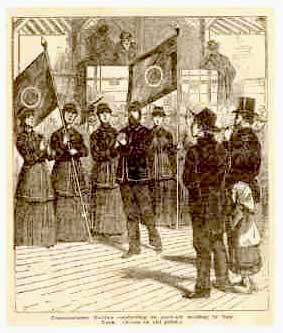
Railton and the 'Hallelujah Lassies' in New York in 1880

In October 1872 Railton travelled to London to commence his work for The Christian Mission, (renamed The Salvation Army in 1878 at a meeting at which Railton was present), and for some years he lived in the Booth household as William Booth's secretary. He became the acting editor of 'The Christian Mission Magazine' and in September 1873 was appointed General Secretary to The Christian Mission.

By 1880, Booth's son Bramwell Booth had matured and became his father's secretary. Railton, who since his youth had had a wish to be a missionary, persuaded Booth to send him to New York to begin the Army's work there. He was well suited to such work, being a skilled linguist, dedicated, and hard-working, and both he and his superiors felt more comfortable with him on the frontier than at headquarters. For example, at the celebration to mark the launch of the Salvation Army Assurance Society he sat on the platform barefoot and in sackcloth to register his disapproval of this worldly turn. With male officers being few in number, Railton took Captain Emma Westbrook and six other young women with the intention of training them for the work on the voyage to the United States.

On 10 March 1880 Railton arrived at Castle Garden, New York with his seven 'Hallelujah Lassies' and immediately set about preaching to the New Yorkers and joining with the unofficial work already begun by the Shirley family in Philadelphia. He also began the work in Newark, New Jersey, leaving two young women in charge there, while he himself set off for St. Louis, Missouri to begin preaching there, but here he was unsuccessful. Meanwhile, in New York the work had gone so well that by May there were sixteen officers, forty cadets, and four hundred and twelve soldiers. By the end of 1880 one thousand five hundred had been converted. In January 1881 Railton received orders from William Booth to return to England. Railton protested that he was needed in the United States but Booth insisted that he should return home.

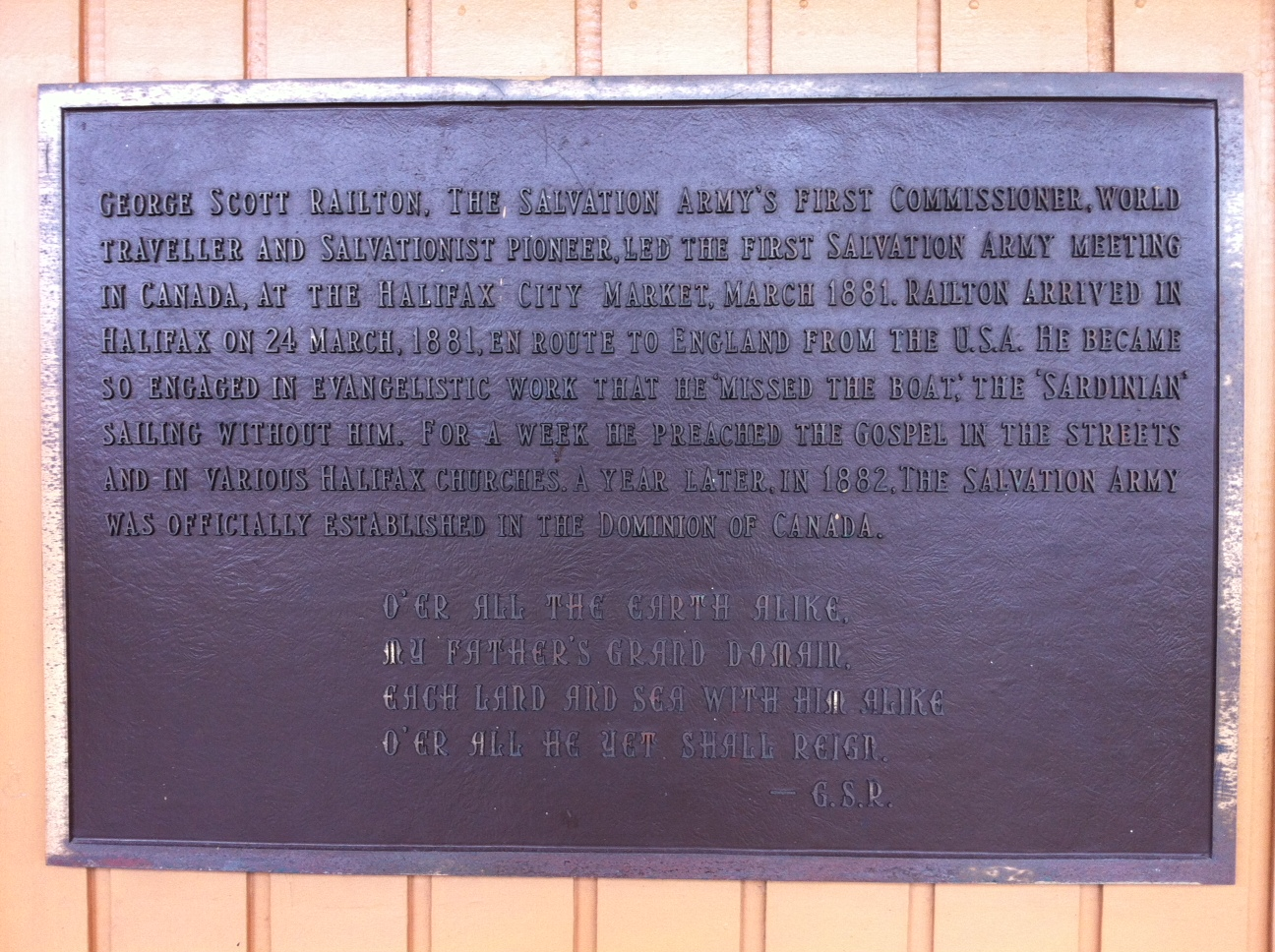
Railton held the first Salvation Army meeting in Canada - Plaque, Halifax, Nova Scotia

En route to England, Railton stopped at the port of Halifax, Nova Scotia and held the first Salvation Army meeting in Canada on 24 March 1881. He was so engaged in his sermon he missed his boat to England. He preached in Halifax for the following week in various Halifax churches and a year later the Salvation Army was officially established in Canada.

In 1884 Railton was married to Marianne Deborah Lydia Ellen Parkyn, a Salvation Army Sergeant in Torquay in Devon. Her father was a Free Church minister who disapproved of The Salvation Army and who opposed the wedding. Eventually he gave his consent and the couple were married by William Booth at Exeter Hall on 17 January 1884. The couple settled at Margate and had children, but Railton was there only rarely.

On 1 January 1885, Commissioner and Mrs. Railton set sail for Natal in South Africa, arriving there on 8 March, with Railton's health declining. On 6 May they arrived at Pietermaritzburg where the idea of the Salvation Army's 'Red Shield Work' for men in the forces came into being. On 19 August 1885 the couple set sail for England.

In 1886 General Booth sent Railton to Germany, where his preaching met with considerable hostility, and little progress was made. However, by 1890, because Germany had a new Kaiser (Wilhelm II) and Otto von Bismarck was retired, it was believed that the situation would improve, and Commissioner Railton was officially appointed Territorial Commander. Later that year, he returned to England to conduct the funeral service of Catherine Booth, 'The Army Mother'. In 1893, as part of a tightening of restrictions by the German government, Railton was expelled from the country.

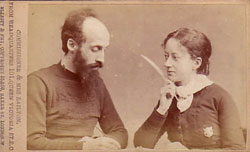
Commissioner and Mrs Railton photographed in Germany in 1886

== Later years ==
In 1894 Railton was sent to Spain, where he remained until being recalled to England in the summer of 1895. Although by now his health was declining, he was called on to assist Bramwell Booth for whom he travelled the world inspecting the work of The Salvation Army. In 1899 Railton set sail for South Africa to negotiate with the political and military leaders before the launching of the Red Shield work among the troops. Although this was initially difficult eventually he overcame all the problems and returned to England at the end of the Boer War in December 1900, where he remained until being sent to take charge of the work in France towards the end of 1901.

At the end of 1902 Railton returned to work at Salvation Army Headquarters until 1903, when he left for West Africa to launch the work of The Salvation Army there. On his return in December 1903 his health had deteriorated greatly, and he was not seen in public again until the International Congress in June 1904.

== Death ==
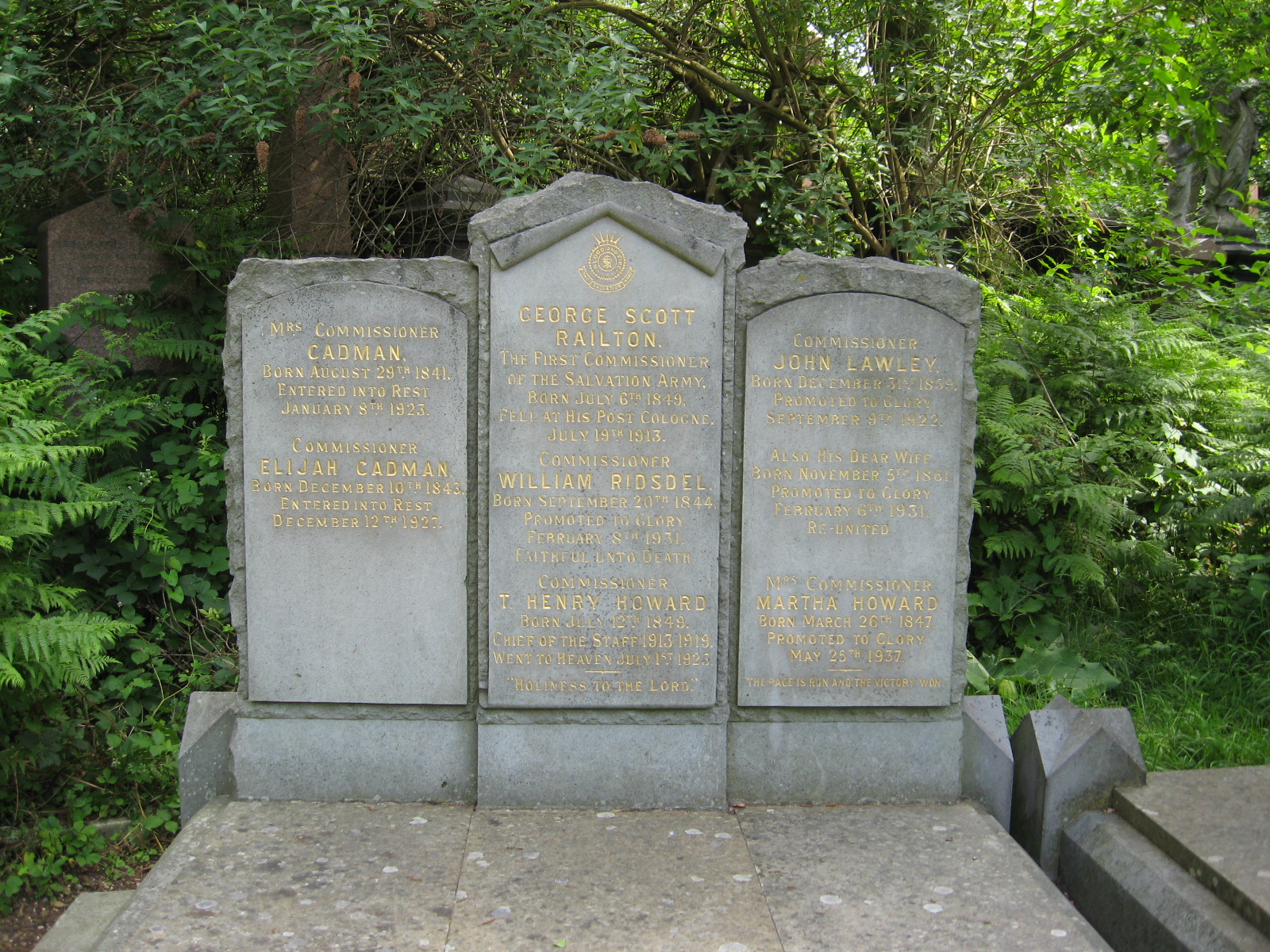
The grave of George Scott Railton in Abney Park Cemetery

In his later years Railton continued to travel widely, visiting many countries on behalf of The Salvation Army, including China, Japan and Russia.

While travelling to Le Locle in Switzerland he had to change trains at Cologne in Germany. Having a long wait for his connection he visited the quarters of the local Salvation Army officers. Delayed by their hospitality and their prayers, he had little time to catch his train and ran up the stairs to the platform carrying his heavy bags. On gaining his seat he collapsed and died of a heart attack on 19 July 1913 in Cologne. He was buried in Abney Park Cemetery, London beside the graves of Catherine and William Booth.

Railton's son was the Reverend David Railton (1884–1955), a Church of England clergyman who conceived the idea of the Tomb of the Unknown Soldier in 1916 while serving as a British Army Chaplain on the Western Front. He died after falling from the overnight train from London arriving at the train station in Fort William on 30 June 1955.

== Legacy ==
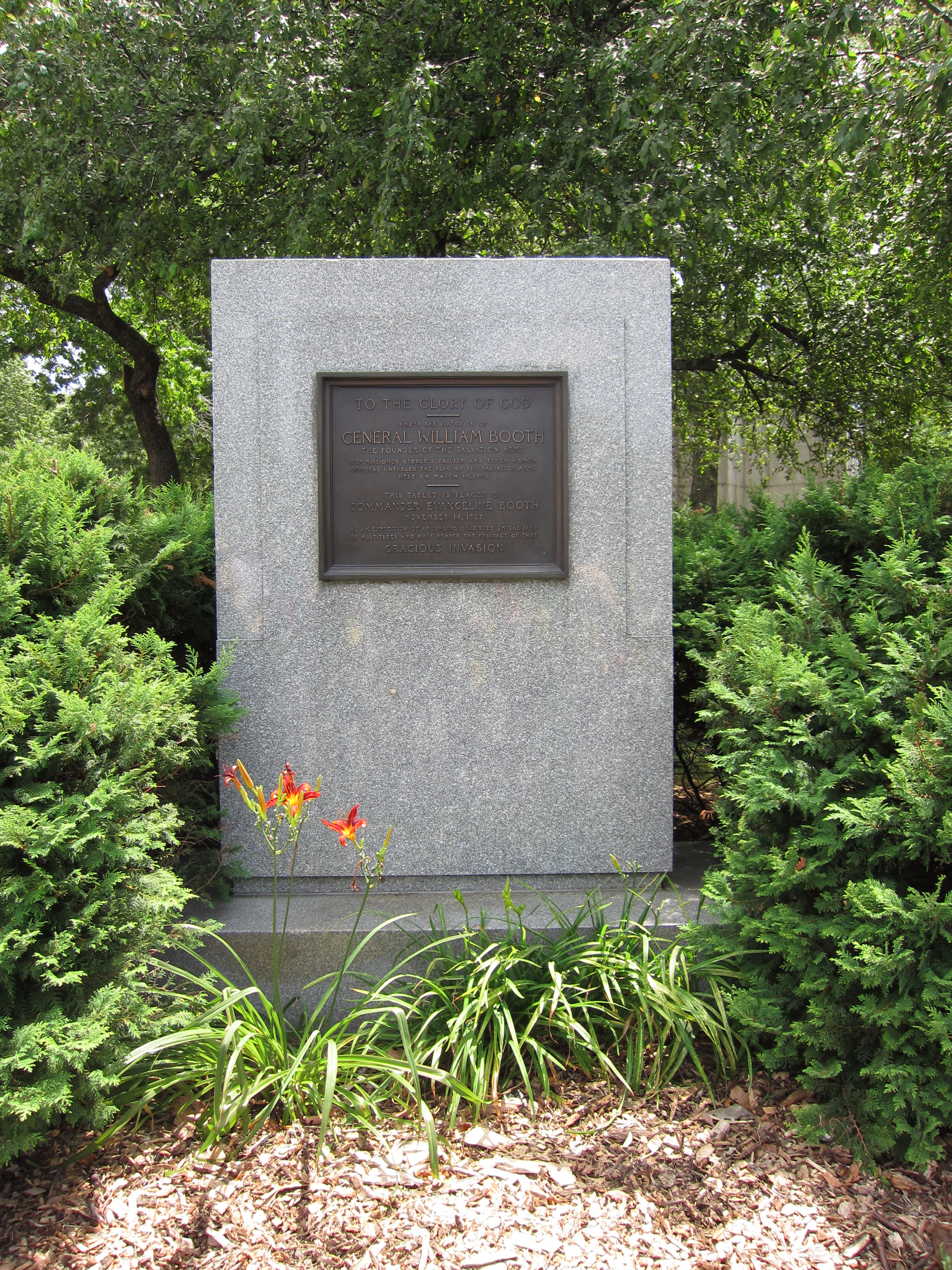
Memorial to Railton's work in Battery Park, New York City

The Railton School for Youth Worker Training in Suffern, New York is named after Commissioner Railton.

== Publications ==
- 'The Authoritative Life of General William Booth', Hodder and Stoughton, (1912)
- 'Forward against Misery. Being an illustrated review of part of the social operations of the Salvation Army, etc.' The Salvation Army, London, (1912–13)
- 'Gideon Ouseley, an Oldtime Irish Salvationist' (1904)
- 'The History of our South African War' (1902)
- 'Lieut.-Col. Jacob Junker of Germany ... With a chapter contributed by Commissioner W. E. Oliphant' (1903)
- 'Peter Cartwright, God's Rough-rider' (1902)
- 'Some Prophecies Fulfilled. Being a brief account of Salvation Army work in various countries, etc.' Salvation Army, London, (1913)
- (Editor), 'The Truth about the Armstrong Case and the Salvation Army: being the Editor of the "Pall Mall Gazette’s" Statement in full, ... the defence of W. Bramwell Booth and Madame Combe by S. D. Waddy; ... the defence of Rebecca Jarrett by Charles Russell; ... and letters from Mrs. Booth and the Chief-of-Staff' Salvation Army Book Stores, London, (1885)
