= Martin Dixon (academic lawyer) =

British academic lawyer

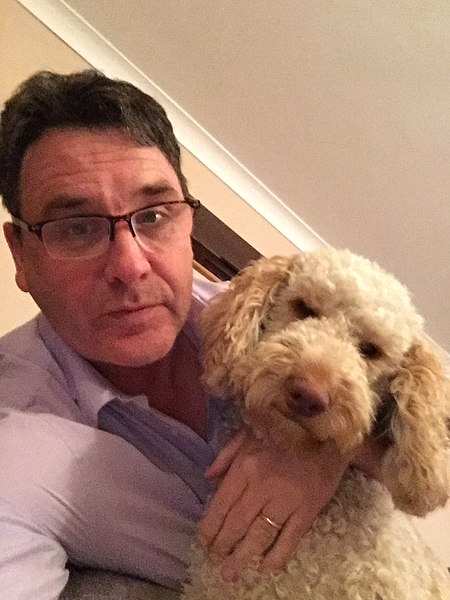
- Born: London
- Citizenship: UK
- Occupation: Professor of Law

Academic background
- Education: University of Oxford

Academic work
- Discipline: Law
- Sub-discipline: Land Law
- Institutions: University of Cambridge

Martin John Dixon, KC (Hon) FAcSS is a British academic lawyer. He is Professor of the Law of Real Property at the University of Cambridge and a Fellow of Queens' College, Cambridge. He is Director of the Cambridge Centre for Property Law and an Honorary Bencher of Lincoln's Inn. He was awarded the University of Cambridge Pilkington Prize for excellence in teaching in 2004. He was previously a Fellow of Robinson College, Cambridge and a Legal Officer for the UNRWA based in Vienna and Gaza City.

He attended Cynffig Comprehensive School and Keble College, Oxford, before teaching at Trinity College, Oxford prior to moving to Robinson College, Cambridge. He moved to Queens' College in 2000. He also teaches Land Law for the GDL at City University, London and for the London University LLB at Hong Kong University.

== Published works ==
He is the author (with HH Judge Stuart Bridge and Judge Elizabeth Cooke) of Megarry & Wade: The Law of Real Property (9th ed 2019), an editor of Ruoff and Roper: The Law and Practice of Registered Conveyancing, and the General Editor of The Conveyancer and Property Lawyer. His Modern Land Law, a student text, is in its 11th edition.
