= Raymond Tallis =

British philosopher (born 1946)

Professor Raymond Tallis FMedSci FRCP FRSA
- Born: 10 October 1946 (age 80); Liverpool, Lancashire, England
- Education: Keble College, Oxford
- Scientific career
- Fields: Medicine, geriatrics, philosophy of mind
- Workplaces: University of Manchester

Raymond C. Tallis (born 10 October 1946) is a philosopher, poet, novelist, cultural critic and a retired medical physician and clinical scientist. Specialising in geriatrics, Tallis served on several UK commissions on medical care of the aged and was an editor or major contributor to two key textbooks in the field, The Clinical Neurology of Old Age and Textbook of Geriatric Medicine and Gerontology.

== Medical career ==
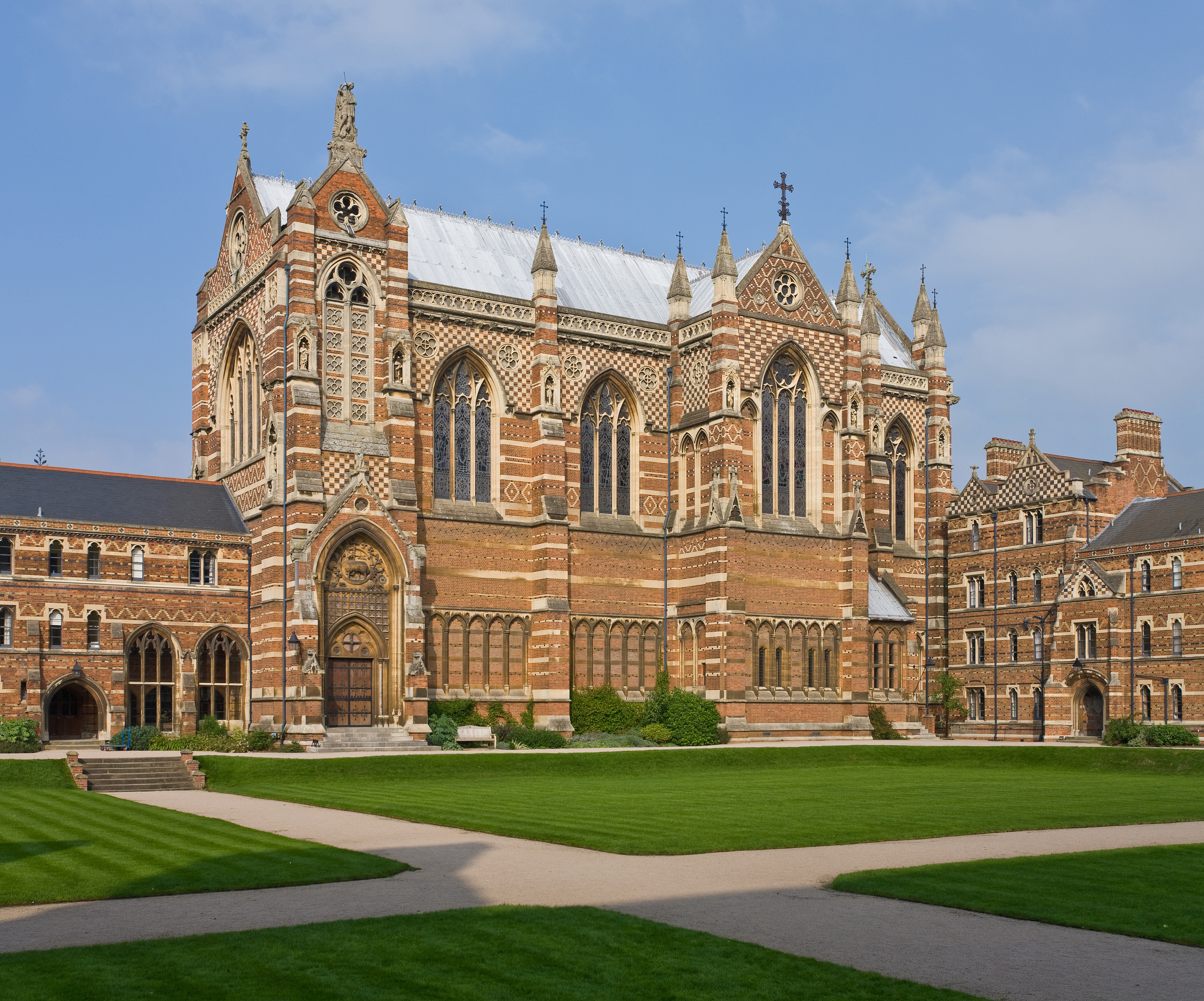
Keble College, Oxford

On leaving Liverpool College, Tallis gained an Open Scholarship to Keble College, Oxford, where he completed a degree in animal physiology in 1967. He completed his medical degree in 1970 at the University of Oxford and St Thomas' Hospital in London. From 1996 to 2000, he was Consultant Adviser in Care of the Elderly to the Chief Medical Officer. In 1999–2000, he was Vice-Chairman of the Stroke Task Force of the Advisory Group developing the National Service Framework for Older People. He has been on the Standing Medical Advisory Committee and the Council of the Royal College of Physicians and was secretary of the Joint Specialist Committee of the Royal College on Health Care of the Elderly between 1995 and 2003. He was a member of the Joint Task Force on Partnership in Medicine Taking, established by Alan Milburn, the Secretary of State for Health, in 2001. For three years he was a member of one of the appraisal panels of the National Institute for Clinical Excellence. He retired in 2006 as professor of geriatric medicine at the University of Manchester.

== Philosophical works ==
Tallis attacked post-structuralism in books such as Not Saussure and Theorrhoea and After, and he contested assumptions of artificial intelligence research in his book Why the Mind is Not a Computer: A Pocket Dictionary on Neuromythology. He denies that our appreciation of art and music can be reduced to scientific terms. His philosophical writings attempt to supply an anthropological account of what is distinctive about human beings. To this end he has written a trilogy of books entitled The Hand; I Am: A Philosophical Inquiry into First-Person Being; and The Knowing Animal. He has also argued extensively about the perceived misuse of scientific language and concepts to explain human experiences.

In 2007 Tallis published Unthinkable Thought: The Enduring Significance of Parmenides. His book The Kingdom of Infinite Space: A Fantastical Journey Around Your Head, which explores the range of activities that go on inside the human head, was published in April 2008. Michelangelo's Finger: An Exploration of Everyday Transcendence was published in 2010.

Aping Mankind: Neuromania, Darwinitis and the Misrepresentation of Humanity was published in 2011. In Defence of Wonder and Other Philosophical Reflections, a collection of essays from The Reader and elsewhere, was published in April 2012.

== Other work ==
Tallis is among the Distinguished Supporters of Humanists UK. Tallis is also a Patron of Dignity in Dying. On 15 September 2010, Tallis, along with 54 other public figures, signed an open letter published in The Guardian, stating their opposition to Pope Benedict XVI's state visit to the UK. In a 2010 interview with author Jesse Horn, Tallis declared that he is an optimistic humanist and an atheist. "Given that I was born a few months after Auschwitz was liberated, it is hardly surprising that I have a strong sense of the evil that humans – individually and collectively – do. My position is that of cautious and chastened optimism, a belief that, if we are ourselves well-treated by others, we will usually treat others reasonably well."
