= List of Agatha Christie's Marple episodes =

Agatha Christie's Marple is a British ITV television series based on the Miss Marple and other murder mystery novels by Agatha Christie. It is also known as Marple. The title character was played by Geraldine McEwan from the first to third series, until her retirement from the role. She was replaced by Julia McKenzie from the fourth series onwards. The first six episodes were all adaptations of Miss Marple novels by Christie. Subsequent episodes were derived both from works featuring Miss Marple but also Christie novels that did not feature the character.

During the course of the programme, 23 episodes of Agatha Christie's Marple aired over six series, between 12 December 2004 and 29 December 2013.

== Series overview ==
| Series | Episodes | Originally released | |
| Series | Episodes | First released | Last released |
|---|---|---|---|
| 1 | 4 | 12 December 2004 | 2 January 2005 |
| 2 | 4 | 5 February 2006 | 30 April 2006 |
| 3 | 4 | 23 September 2007 | 1 January 2009 |
| 4 | 4 | 6 September 2009 | 15 June 2011 |
| 5 | 4 | 30 August 2010 | 2 January 2011 |
| 6 | 3 | 16 June 2013 | 29 December 2013 |

== Episodes ==
=== Series 1 (2004–2005) ===
| No. overall | No. in series | Title | Directed by | Written by | Original release date | UK viewers (millions) |
|---|---|---|---|---|---|---|
| 1 | 1 | "The Body in the Library" | Andy Wilson | Kevin Elyot | 12 December 2004 | 8.72 |
A young woman's corpse is dumped in the library of Gossington Hall, home of Jane Marple's friend Dolly Bantry (Joanna Lumley) and her husband Arthur (James Fox). Pompous Chief Constable Melchett (Simon Callow) suspects a connection with Basil Blake (Ben Miller), an arty young man who lives locally but Blake is dismissive when Melchett visits him. Then Superintendent Harper (Jack Davenport) rings from the coastal town of Danemouth. Ruby Keane (Emma Williams), a young girl employed as a dancer at the Majestic Hotel there, has gone missing, and her cousin Josie Turner (Mary Stockley) identifies the corpse as Ruby's. Ruby is in favour with millionaire Conway Jefferson (Ian Richardson), whose own son and daughter were killed in a wartime air raid, and he wants to adopt her. His son-in-law Mark Gaskell (Jamie Theakston), and daughter-in-law Adelaide (Tara Fitzgerald) react variously to the news. Miss Marple is convinced that the solution to Ruby's murder may be found at the hotel and she and Dolly book into a suite to investigate. There is no shortage of suspects, not only family members but the handsome Raymond Starr (Adam Garcia), another of the hotel's dance professionals, and George Bartlett (David Walliams), the last person to see Ruby before her disappearance. Robin Soans, Bruce Mackinnon, and Richard Durden also appear.
| 2 | 2 | "The Murder at the Vicarage" | Charlie Palmer | Stephen Churchett | 19 December 2004 | 8.36 |
Colonel Lucius Protheroe (Derek Jacobi) is the local magistrate and churchwarden in St Mary Mead, and probably its least-liked resident, widely resented for his superior and demanding attitude. So, when he is found dead in the vicarage study, there is no end of suspects. His second wife, Anne (Janet McTeer), was having an affair with a local artist, Lawrence Redding (Jason Flemyng). His young daughter Lettice (Christina Cole) was rebelling under his strict rule. There is also the fretful Vicar, whose wife seemed to be harbouring secrets from him, and his assistant, whom Protheroe suspected of stealing church funds. Additionally, the Protheroes were hosting French guests who seemed too inquisitive of the estate home's contents. As well, the Protheroe's maid, Mary (Siobhan Hayes), was the girlfriend of a man the Colonel had recently sentenced to prison. Finally, there is the recently arrived Mrs. Lester (Jane Asher), with whom the Colonel has had some mysterious previous connection. Jane Marple, recuperating at home from a sprained ankle, had a bird's eye view of all the comings and goings at the vicarage around the time of the murder a nd she gladly assists Inspector Slack (Stephen Tompkinson) in solving the crime. Jana Carpenter, Tim McInnerny, Rachael Stirling, Julian Morris, Mark Gatiss, Robert Powell, Angela Pleasence, Miriam Margolyes, Herbert Lom, Emily Bruni, Ruth Sheen, and Julie Cox also appear.
| 3 | 3 | "4:50 from Paddington" | Andy Wilson | Stephen Churchett | 26 December 2004 | 5.95 |
Miss Marple investigates the wealthy Crackenthorpe clan, believing a body to be hidden on their estate after a visiting friend witnesses a brutal strangling murder occurring on a passing train. Griff Rhys Jones, David Warner, Niamh Cusack, Ben Daniels, Charlie Creed-Miles. Pam Ferris, Michael Landes, Rob Brydon, Rose Keegan, Pip Torrens, Amanda Holden, John Hannah, Celia Imrie, Neve McIntosh and Jenny Agutter appear.
| 4 | 4 | "A Murder Is Announced" | John Strickland | Stewart Harcourt | 2 January 2005 | 7.78 |
The residents of Chipping Cleghorn are astonished to read an advert in the local newspaper that a murder will take place the following Friday at 6:30 p.m. at Little Paddocks, the home of Letitia Blacklock (Zoë Wanamaker). A group gathers and at that precise moment, the lights go out and a young hotel employee, Rudi Scherz, is shot. The police assume he had placed the ad and planned it as a robbery, but for Miss Marple it's not that obvious. She believes that the killer was likely one of the people in the room. Miss Marple must unravel a complex series of relationships and false identities, all centred around Randall Goedler, a wealthy industrialist who had died 10 years earlier. Christian Coulson, Cherie Lunghi, Robert Pugh, Keeley Hawes, Claire Skinner, Frances Barber, Elaine Paige, Matthew Goode, Sienna Guillory, Catherine Tate, Alexander Armstrong, Gerard Horan, Lesley Nicol, and Virginia McKenna also appear.

=== Series 2 (2006) ===
| No. overall | No. in series | Title | Directed by | Written by | Original release date | UK viewers (millions) |
|---|---|---|---|---|---|---|
| 5 | 1 | "Sleeping Murder" | Edward Hall | Stephen Churchett | 5 February 2006 | 8.74 |
Miss Jane Marple is asked to help Gwenda (Sophia Myles), a wealthy young woman who has bought a house on the English coast, only to experience disturbing visions. Thanks to Miss Marple's investigations, Gwenda discovers that, instead of spending all her life in India, she had lived in the house as a child. The visions are actually flashes of memory – and she realizes she witnessed the murder of a beautiful woman named "Helen" (Anna-Louise Plowman). Julian Wadham, Aidan McArdle, Harry Treadaway, Richard Bremmer, Harriet Walter, Greg Hicks, Mary Healey, Peter Serafinowicz, Una Stubbs, Paul McGann, Dawn French, Nickolas Grace, Sarah Parish, Martin Kemp, Phil Davis, Russ Abbot and Geraldine Chaplin also appear.
| 6 | 2 | "The Moving Finger" | Tom Shankland | Kevin Elyot | 12 February 2006 | 7.89 |
When troubled war veteran Jerry Burton (James D'Arcy) and his sister Joanna (Emilia Fox) relocate to the quiet little village of Lymstock in order to allow Jerry to recuperate from injuries received in what he claims is a motorcycle accident, they are expecting nothing more than country sleepiness and tedium. Much to their surprise, however, they find themselves embroiled in the middle of scandal and secrets; someone is sending vicious poison-pen letters to the residents. A local dignitary has already taken his own life over the letters, and it's not long before local gossip Mona Symmington (Imogen Stubbs) also commits suicide after receiving a letter. But when the letter-writer apparently resorts to murder, Jerry finds his curiosity stoked despite himself, and he's not the only one; Miss Jane Marple is also in Lymstock, and she's decided that it's long past time someone got to the bottom of this unpleasant business. Ken Russell, Frances de la Tour, Thelma Barlow, Jessica Hynes, Sean Pertwee, Harry Enfield, Kelly Brook, John Sessions, Rosalind Knight, Ellen Capron, Talulah Riley, Angela Curran, and Keith Allen also appear.
| 7 | 3 | "By the Pricking of My Thumbs" | Peter Medak | Stewart Harcourt | 19 February 2006 | 7.93 |
When Tommy and Tuppence (Anthony Andrews and Greta Scacchi) visit an elderly aunt in her nursing home, Tuppence is concerned by the odd behaviour of some staff and residents. So when Tuppence hears about Aunt Ada's (Claire Bloom) sudden death and the disappearance of her friend Mrs Lancaster (June Whitfield), she realizes her concerns were right. Tuppence meets Miss Marple and together they follow a path of clues that lead them to the Norfolk village of Farrell St Edmund, where they find a community guarding an array of secrets. Only by getting to the bottom of these secrets do they begin to unravel the truth about the mystery of Aunt Ada's death and Mrs Lancaster's disappearance. This story did not originally feature Miss Marple. Clare Holman, Miriam Karlin, Steven Berkoff, O-T Fagbenle, Josie Lawrence, Michael Maloney, Michelle Ryan, Lia Williams, Charles Dance, Bonnie Langford, Brian Conley, Leslie Phillips and Eliza Bennett also appear.
| 8 | 4 | "The Sittaford Mystery" | Paul Unwin | Stephen Churchett | 30 April 2006 | 6.58 |
When Clive Trevelyan (Timothy Dalton) – Member of Parliament, war hero and heir apparent to Prime Minister Winston Churchill (Robert Hardy) – is killed, Miss Marple sets about to solve the case. Trevelyan has made his fortune many years before in Egypt having secretly uncovered a lost tomb. He is killed during a major snowstorm when there are no police available. There are several possible suspects including Trevelyan's ward, James Pearson (Laurence Fox) and his fiancée Emily Trefusis (Zoe Telford); his political agent, John Enderby (Mel Smith); a journalist Charles Burnaby (James Murray); a visiting American Martin Zimmerman (Michael Brandon); and several other apparently disinterested parties. A convict has also escaped from Dartmoor prison. Miss Marple concludes that Trevalyan's murder is related to his days in Egypt and sets about to identify the murderer. This story did not originally feature Miss Marple. Ian Hallard, Jeffery Kissoon, Rita Tushingham, James Wilby, Paul Kaye, Carey Mulligan, Patricia Hodge, Matthew Kelly, and Michael Attwell also appear.

=== Series 3 (2007–2009) ===
Series 3 was broadcast in Canada before the UK transmission, and in different episode orders.

| No. overall | No. in series | Title | Directed by | Written by | Original release date | UK viewers (millions) |
|---|---|---|---|---|---|---|
| 9 | 1 | "At Bertram's Hotel" | Dan Zeff | Tom MacRae | 23 September 2007 (UK); 1 April 2007 (Canada) | 5.41 |
While Miss Marple is staying at the very posh Bertram's Hotel, a hotel maid, Tilly Rice (Hannah Spearritt), is found strangled on the roof. Miss Marple investigates with the help of Jane Cooper (Martine McCutcheon), also a hotel maid. When an attempt is made on the life of a hotel guest, Elvira Blake (Emily Beecham), and Micky Gorman (Vincent Regan) is accidentally killed instead, the two Janes work together to find the motive and the identity of the killer. Adam Smethurst, Mark Heap, Mary Nighy, Charles Kay, Ed Stoppard, Nicholas Burns, Mica Paris, Francesca Annis, Peter Davison, Polly Walker, Danny Webb, and Stephen Mangan also appear.
| 10 | 2 | "Ordeal by Innocence" | Moira Armstrong | Stewart Harcourt | 30 September 2007 (UK); 3 June 2007 (Canada) | 5.54 |
Miss Marple is invited to the wedding of a friend, but the gaieties are interrupted when a stranger arrives; he provides the missing evidence which proves that the black sheep of the family, Jacko, was wrongfully hanged for murder. This raises the question of who in the household did kill the cold-hearted mistress of the house two years previously. As usual, Miss Marple is needed to uncover the hatred, jealousy, lust etc. behind the family's facade and sort out the threads of the mystery. This story did not originally feature Miss Marple. Juliet Stevenson, Denis Lawson, Alison Steadman, Richard Armitage, Stephanie Leonidas, Lisa Stansfield, Burn Gorman, Jane Seymour, Tom Riley, Reece Shearsmith, Julian Rhind-Tutt, Bryan Dick, Gugu Mbatha-Raw, Andrea Lowe, Michael Feast, Pippa Haywood, and Camille Coduri.
| 11 | 3 | "Towards Zero" | David Grindley & Nicolas Winding Refn | Kevin Elyot | 3 August 2008 (UK); 28 January 2007 (Canada) | 5.84 |
Miss Marple is visiting an old school friend, Camilla, Lady Tressilian (Eileen Atkins), along with an eclectic group: Neville Strange (Greg Wise) and his wife Kay (Zoë Tapper), his former wife Audrey (Saffron Burrows) and her childhood friend and cousin Thomas Royde (Julian Sands), Ted Latimer (who is something of a gigolo and very attracted to Kay Strange) and finally Freddie Treves (Tom Baker), a retired solicitor. When Treves is found dead the day after a dinner party at Lady Tressilian's home and Lady Tressilian herself is found bludgeoned to death a short time later, Miss Marple must sort through the complex set of relationships among all the players, and determine what role the tale of a child's crime may have had to play in the deaths. This story did not originally feature Miss Marple. Julie Graham, Amelda Brown, Jo Woodcock, Alan Davies, and Thomas Arnold also appear.
| 12 | 4 | "Nemesis" | Nicolas Winding Refn | Stephen Churchett | 1 January 2009 (UK); 25 February 2007 (Canada) | 4.48 |
Miss Marple is called upon to solve her most perplexing case yet. Upon his death, financier Jason Rafiel (Herbert Lom) asks her to solve a murder. Only problem is that the murder may or may not have taken place as yet and the victim is unknown. All that he has given her is two tickets on the Daffodil Tour Company's Mystery Tour. It soon becomes obvious that others on the tour were also "selected" by Mr. Rafiel. Jane Marple, assisted by her nephew Raymond West (Richard E. Grant), concludes that the case must be related to that of Verity Hunt (Laura Michelle Kelly), a young woman who in 1939 was running away from an overattentive landlord and eventually disappeared. When a member of the tour dies mysteriously, she also realizes that someone is desperate to keep a deep, dark secret. Dan Stevens, Graeme Garden, Ruth Wilson, Johnny Briggs, Ronni Ancona, Adrian Rawlins, Emily Woof, Will Mellor, Anne Reid, Amanda Burton, and Lee Ingleby also appear.

=== Series 4 (2009–2011) ===
The first and second episode of the fourth series were broadcast in Ireland before transmission in UK. The third and fourth episode were broadcast in Colombia and Hungary before transmission in UK.

| No. overall | No. in series | Title | Directed by | Written by | Original release date | UK viewers (millions) |
|---|---|---|---|---|---|---|
| 13 | 1 | "A Pocket Full of Rye" | Charlie Palmer | Kevin Elyot | 6 September 2009 (UK); 8 November 2008 (Ireland) | 5.39 |
When Rex Fortescue (Kenneth Cranham) dies while sitting at his desk in the City, it's determined that he was in fact poisoned. He was married to a much younger wife, who now stands to inherit. His son Percival (Ben Miles), a partner in the family firm, was a disappointment to him and a daughter, Elaine (Hattie Morahan), hasn't amounted to much. Another son, Lance, had a falling out with his father many years before and relocated to East Africa. He suddenly appears soon after his father's death claiming that they had reconciled and been invited by him to return to England with an offer to rejoin the firm. Miss Marple takes a particular interest in the case when her former maid Gladys, now working in the Fortescue household, is also murdered. She soon learns that the elder Fortescue had received veiled threats for some time and that they might have something to do with a long ago business deal that made his initial fortune. Laura Haddock, Lucy Cohu, Rupert Graves, Matthew Macfadyen, Edward Tudor-Pole, Ralf Little, Helen Baxendale, Anna Madeley, Joseph Beattie, Wendy Richard, Liz White, Paul Brooke, Chris Larkin, and Prunella Scales also appear.
| 14 | 2 | "Murder Is Easy" | Hettie Macdonald | Stephen Churchett | 13 September 2009 (UK); 15 November 2008 (Ireland) | 4.86 |
While traveling on a train to London, Miss Marple is told by a woman she has never met, Lavinia Pinkerton (Sylvia Syms), that she is certain there have been two murders in her village of Wychwood. When Lavinia dies in what is purported to be an accident – she fell, or was pushed, down the escalator in a tube station – Miss Marple decides to visit Wychwood and see what she can find. As Miss Marple is apt to say, one English village is like another and Wychwood has its secrets like any other. The first woman to die was Florie Gibbs (Lyndsey Marshal) who, despite being experienced in such things, supposedly ate poison mushrooms she picked herself. The second was the local vicar who failed to wear his mask when using poison near his beehives. The third is a young woman who, it is said, accidentally drank hat dye instead of her cough medicine. Miss Marple finds a clue that points to a motive with origins many years before and a secret someone will do anything, including murder, to keep hidden. This story did not originally feature Miss Marple. Steve Pemberton, Shirley Henderson, Benedict Cumberbatch, James Lance, Tim Brooke-Taylor, Camilla Arfwedson, Hugo Speer, Anna Chancellor, David Haig, Margo Stilley, Jemma Redgrave, Russell Tovey, and Steven Hartley also appear.
| 15 | 3 | "They Do It With Mirrors" | Andy Wilson | Paul Rutman | 1 January 2010 (UK); 4 May 2009 (Hungary) | 5.55 |
Miss Marple is requested to help her old friend Carrie-Louise (Penelope Wilton), the loving wife of benign philanthropist Lewis Serrocold (Brian Cox). Carrie-Louise is slowly poisoned by an unknown hand, and her husband and her sister Ruth (Joan Collins) want absolutely to save her from this dark menace. Elliot Cowan, Emma Griffiths Malin, Sarah Smart, Maxine Peake, Alexei Sayle, Liam Garrigan, Tom Payne, Nigel Terry, Ian Ogilvy, and Alex Jennings also appear.
| 16 | 4 | "Why Didn't They Ask Evans?" | Nicholas Renton | Patrick Barlow | 15 June 2011 (UK); 2 March 2009 (Colombia) | 3.86 |
While visiting her friend Marjorie Attfield (Helen Lederer), Miss Marple learns that her son Bobby (Sean Biggerstaff) had recently found a body, identified as a Mr. Pritchard, on the cliff side. He's received a letter asking him to appear at the enquiry but it seems to be a wild goose chase meant to keep him away from the real enquiry taking place elsewhere. Now accompanied by a friend, Frankie Derwent (Georgia Tennant), they trace the dead man to nearby Castle Savage, home to a dysfunctional family with great deal of money. The family patriarch, Jack Savage, had died not long ago and the dead man had some connection to the Savages. But what is the key to solving the mystery of Pritchard's last words to Bobby as he lay dying: "Why didn't they ask Evans?". This story did not originally feature Miss Marple. Siwan Morris, Samantha Bond, Richard Briers, Freddie Fox, Rik Mayall, Hannah Murray, Rafe Spall, Natalie Dormer, Warren Clarke, and Mark Williams also appear.

=== Series 5 (2010–2011) ===
This series was broadcast in the UK between the third and last episode of the fourth series.

| No. overall | No. in series | Title | Directed by | Written by | Original release date | UK viewers (millions) |
|---|---|---|---|---|---|---|
| 17 | 1 | "The Pale Horse" | Andy Hay | Russell Lewis | 30 August 2010 (UK); 21 July 2010 (Sweden) | 4.97 |
Miss Marple is shocked when she receives a note from an old friend, Father Gorman (Nicholas Parsons), only to read in the newspaper the very same day that he was murdered. He had attended a dying woman, Mrs. Davis (Elizabeth Rider), who died the previous evening and it was while he was on his way home that he was apparently attacked. The police have put it down to a mugging but the letter Miss Marple received from him intrigues her: a list of surnames and a quote from the bible. The policeman in charge of the case, Inspector Lejeune (Neil Pearson) is skeptical about it all being a murder but when Miss Marple inspects Mrs. Davis' rooms, she finds an identical list to that sent to her by Father Gorman and also a reference to the Pale Horse Inn in Much Deeping, Hampshire. She soon checks into the inn and pursues her own investigation. This story did not originally feature Miss Marple. Lynda Baron, JJ Feild, Jason Merrells, Jonathan Cake, Nigel Planer, Jenny Galloway, Susan Lynch, Pauline Collins, Tom Ward, Sarah Alexander, Holly Valance, Amy Manson, Holly Willoughby, and Bill Paterson also appear.
| 18 | 2 | "The Secret of Chimneys" | John Strickland | Paul Rutman | 27 December 2010 (UK); 4 April 2010 (Norway) | 4.69 |
Miss Marple finds herself spending the weekend at Chimneys, the stately home of Lord Caterham (Edward Fox) whose late wife was her cousin. The weekend has something of a diplomatic air to it as the Austrian Count Ludwig von Stainach (Anthony Higgins) is also there to negotiate a trade agreement with the British that will give it access to iron ore. Chimneys was once the 'in' place to be for a fancy weekend but over many years, it has become somewhat run-down. Except for a maid who disappeared with a valuable diamond in the 1930s, not much of note has happened there for a long time. Everyone is surprised when Count von Stainach says that in addition to signing the trade agreement, he also wants to purchase Chimneys. Lord Caterham's eldest daughter Bundle Brent (Dervla Kirwan) is dead set against the idea but it all takes a very serious turn when the Count is found murdered. There are several suspects and another member of the household will die before Miss Marple solves the crime. This story did not originally feature Miss Marple. Mathew Horne, Adam Godley, Charlotte Salt, Jonas Armstrong, Michelle Collins, Ruth Jones, and Stephen Dillane also appear.
| 19 | 3 | "The Blue Geranium" | David Moore | Stewart Harcourt | 29 December 2010 (UK); 27 June 2010 (USA) | 5.71 |
While visiting her friend Dermot (David Calder) in Little Ambrose, Miss Marple is drawn into investigating the death of Eddie Seward (Jason Durr), whom she'd met on the bus and who is found having apparently drowned in the river. Within a few days however, there is a second suspicious death, that of Mary Pritchard (Sharon Small) who seems to have died from fright. She was disliked by many and had recently caused a scene when her husband George (Toby Stephens) was inaugurated as the Captain of the local golf club. Even Dermot disliked her as did her sister Philippa (Claudie Blakley), who was once engaged to George, whom she described as the love of her life. Philippa ended up marrying George's brother, Lewis Pritchard (Paul Rhys), and they are constantly having money problems. A third death – this time one of George Pritchard's former mistresses – convinces Inspector Somerset (Kevin McNally) that George, who conveniently confesses, is the murderer. Miss Marple thinks otherwise and sets out to prove it. Joanna Page, Claire Rushbrook, Derek Hutchinson, Donald Sinden, Patrick Baladi, and Caroline Catz also appear.
| 20 | 4 | "The Mirror Crack'd from Side to Side" | Tom Shankland | Kevin Elyot | 2 January 2011 (UK); 28 February 2010 (Norway) | 4.58 |
Hollywood star Marina Gregg (Lindsay Duncan) leaves Los Angeles for the picturesque countryside of St Mary Mead. Having taken up residence at Gossington Hall with her dashing young English husband, film director Jason Rudd (Nigel Harman), his secretary, Ella Blunt (Victoria Smurfit) and Marina's exclusive personal assistant, Hailey Preston (Brennan Brown), it's not long before she becomes lady of the manor. When the glamorous couple decide to throw a benefit for the St John Ambulance, the grounds are abuzz with curious locals including previous owner of Gossington Hall, Dolly Bantry (Joanna Lumley). But when a local fan, Heather Badcock (Caroline Quentin) consumes a poisoned daiquiri, Marina finds herself starring in a real-life mystery – supported by Miss Marple and Inspector Hewitt, who suspect that the lethal cocktail was intended for someone else. But who? If it was meant for Marina, then why? Martin Jarvis, Hannah Waddingham, Neil Stuke, Hugh Bonneville, Samuel Barnett, and Will Young also appear.

=== Series 6 (2013) ===
First episode was broadcast in Hungary before transmission in UK and last in Argentina.

| No. overall | No. in series | Title | Directed by | Written by | Original release date | UK viewers (millions) |
|---|---|---|---|---|---|---|
| 21 | 1 | "A Caribbean Mystery" | Charlie Palmer | Charlie Higson | 16 June 2013 (UK); 15 June 2013 (Hungary) | 4.31 |
After a period of ill health, Miss Marple leaves St. Mary Mead for the tropical Caribbean paradise of St. Honoré, where an English couple – Tim and Molly Kendall (Robert Webb and Charity Wakefield)– run a quaint little resort called the Golden Palms. Among the many guests, which include the innocuous Hillingdons (Alastair Mackenzie and Hermione Norris), their unseemly American friends the Dysons (Charles Mesure and MyAnna Buring), and gruff business tycoon Jason Rafiel (Antony Sher), is garrulous Major Palgrave (Oliver Ford Davies), who is friendly to all – much to everyone's chagrin. When Palgrave launches into his infamous storytelling routine one evening, only Miss Marple takes enough interest to listen. Talk quickly turns to murder, and Palgrave coyly asks her if she'd like to see a photograph of a serial killer. But before he can pull it out, he sees something – or someone – and quickly changes the subject. After a night of excessive drink and entertainment, including a voodoo show, Palgrave is found dead in his room the next morning – the cause of death being a heart attack. Sensing his death is no coincidence, Miss Marple takes it upon herself to unravel the secrets of the guests of St. Honoré, intent on finding the one person with a secret worth killing for. But more victims will be claimed, and one suspect will slowly lose their grip on sanity altogether before this Caribbean mystery will be solved. Pippa Bennett-Warner, Kingsley Ben-Adir, Montserrat Lombard, and Daniel Rigby also appear. Jeremy Crutchley and Charlie Higson cameo as Ian Fleming and James Bond respectively.
| 22 | 2 | "Greenshaw's Folly" | Sarah Harding | Tim Whitnall | 23 June 2013 | 4.39 |
When old family friend Louisa Oxley (Kimberley Nixon) visits Miss Marple one stormy night seeking help, Miss Marple decides to send her and her son, Archie, to safety at the labyrinthine estate of Greenshaw's Folly, owned by Miss Marple's good friend Katherine Greenshaw (Fiona Shaw), an eccentric botanist and the last surviving Greenshaw. Louisa becomes Miss Greenshaw's secretary, and quickly attracts the attention of the gardener Alfred Pollock (Martin Compston) and actor Nat Fletcher (Sam Reid). Things turn sinister when the Folly's faithful butler, Walter Cracken (Vic Reeves), is killed in what appears to be a tragic accident. Then a guest at the house, Horace Bindler (Rufus Jones), disappears without a trace. Miss Marple is convinced all is unwell, and her suspicions are confirmed when Miss Greenshaw herself is brutally murdered. Suspects are everywhere, but none can imagine the secrets, both past and present, which Miss Marple uncovers. Julia Sawalha, Joanna David, Robert Glenister, Judy Parfitt, John Gordon Sinclair and Matt Willis also appear.
| 23 | 3 | "Endless Night" | David Moore | Kevin Elyot | 29 December 2013 (UK); 20 November 2013 (Argentina) | 4.57 |
Miss Marple is in Kingston Bishop staying with her recently widowed friend Marjorie Philpot (Wendy Craig). There she meets a handsome man, Mike Rogers (Tom Hughes). Mike hasn't done much with his life so far – he was working as a chauffeur when they first meet and later, as a barman. If Mike had his way he'd buy a piece of property that's on the market, known as Gypsy's Acre, and build a new house on the site. He's penniless and it all seems impossible until he meets Ellie (Joanna Vanderham), who has also fallen in love with the property. Ellie is a rich heiress and they soon fall in love. They are warned however that the land is cursed and once into their new house, it becomes apparent that someone is trying to scare them off. When someone is killed in an apparent riding accident, Miss Marple believes it to be murder. This story did not originally feature Miss Marple. Aneurin Barnard, Wendy Craig, Janet Henfrey, Tamzin Outhwaite, Glynis Barber, Michael McKell, Hugh Dennis, Rosalind Halstead, Celyn Jones, Caroline O'Neill and Stephen Churchett also appear.
