= Agatha Christie's Marple =

British ITV television series

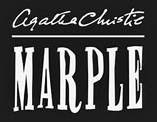
- Also known as: Marple
- Starring: Geraldine McEwan (2004–2009); Julia McKenzie (2009–2013)
- Music by: Dominik Scherrer
- Country of origin: United Kingdom
- Original language: English
- No. of series: 6
- No. of episodes: 23 (list of episodes)

Production
- Running time: 88–94 minutes
- Production companies: Agatha Christie Ltd. (Chorion/RLJ Entertainment); ITV Studios; WGBH Boston

Original release
- Network: ITV
- Release: 12 December 2004 – 29 December 2013

Related
- Miss Marple

Agatha Christie's Marple is a British ITV television programme loosely based on books and short stories by British crime novelist Agatha Christie. The title character was played by Geraldine McEwan from the first to the third series, until her retirement from the role, and by Julia McKenzie from the fourth series onwards. Unlike the counterpart TV series Agatha Christie's Poirot, the show took many liberties with Christie's works, most notably adding Miss Marple's character to the adaptations of novels in which she never appeared. Following the conclusion of the sixth series, the BBC acquired the rights for the production of Agatha Christie adaptations, suggesting that ITV would be unable to make a seventh series of Marple.

== Premise ==
Agatha Christie's Marple follows the adventures of Miss Jane Marple, an elderly spinster living in the quiet little village of St. Mary Mead. During her many visits to friends and relatives in other villages (and sometimes when simply being at home), Miss Marple often stumbles upon or hears about mysterious murders, which she helps solve. Although the police are sometimes reluctant to accept Miss Marple's help, her reputation and unparalleled powers of observation eventually win them over.

During her adventures, Miss Marple is aided by close friends, relatives, or other allies that she meets, which include Tommy and Tuppence (protagonists of another series of Christie novels).

== Cast and characters ==
The only character to appear in every episode is Miss Marple herself, played by Geraldine McEwan up to series 3 and by Julia McKenzie from series 4 onwards.

A few other characters appear in more than one episode, although they are not always played by the same actor. Exceptions are Joanna Lumley, who plays Mrs Dolly Bantry in The Body in the Library and The Mirror Crack'd from Side to Side, and Stephen Churchett, who appears as the coroner in four episodes.

Dr Haydock appears in three episodes, but is played by three actors: Robin Soans in The Body in the Library, Robert Powell in The Murder at the Vicarage and Neil Stuke in The Mirror Crack'd from Side to Side. Jason Rafiel, an old friend of Marple's, was voiced by Herbert Lom (who also made an on-screen appearance as Mr Dufosse in The Murder at the Vicarage) in Nemesis and played by Antony Sher in A Caribbean Mystery.

The series also featured real-life characters: Winston Churchill appeared in The Sittaford Mystery, Noël Coward in 4:50 from Paddington, Louis Armstrong in At Bertram's Hotel, and Ian Fleming and ornithologist James Bond in A Caribbean Mystery.

== Episodes ==
Series	Episodes	Originally released	
Series	Episodes	First released	Last released
1	4	12 December 2004	2 January 2005
2	4	5 February 2006	30 April 2006
3	4	23 September 2007	1 January 2009
4	4	6 September 2009	15 June 2011
5	4	30 August 2010	2 January 2011
6	3	16 June 2013	29 December 2013

Each series consists of four feature-length episodes, except series six which has only three episodes. The first six episodes were all adaptations of Miss Marple novels by Christie. Subsequent episodes were derived from works featuring Miss Marple and Christie novels that did not feature the character. The title of the series removes the word Miss from Miss Marple, to match the title of Agatha Christie's Poirot series.

== Production ==
Marple was filmed in various locations, including London, the villages of Englefield in Berkshire, Chilham in Kent, Turville in Buckinghamshire and Blewbury in Oxfordshire.

Windsor Guildhall in Windsor was featured as the fictional Melchester in Murder at the Vicarage,. Knebworth House in Hertfordshire was used as the exterior of Rutherford Hall in 4:50 from Paddington, while Highclere Castle was used for the interior shots. Knebworth House was also used in Greenshaw's Folly. Hatfield House was used as Chimneys in The Secret of Chimneys, and also in Greenshaw's Folly.

Hambleden was used as St Mary Mead and Dorney Court featured in The Body in the Library as Gossington Hall, home of the Bantrys, and also as the vicarage in "The Moving Finger" Fawley Court in Buckinghamshire was used as Stoneygates in They Do It with Mirrors. The Homewood in Surrey was used as Michael and Ellie's house in Endless Night, while The Grotto was used as the exterior of their secret folly.

In Why Didn't They Ask Evans?, the Castle Savage scenes were largely filmed at Loseley Park near Guildford. A Caribbean Mystery was filmed in Cape Town, South Africa, although the beach scenes were shot at Boulders Beach. For the production based on Endless Night, scenes were filmed in Dorchester.

The exterior of Marina Gregg's house in The Mirror Crack'd from Side to Side were filmed at North Mymms Park, and the cemetery in Nemesis was filmed at Waverley Abbey.

== Adaptations and changes from novels ==
Christie's twelve novels featuring Miss Marple were all adapted for the series. The Murder at the Vicarage, The Body in the Library, 4:50 from Paddington, and A Murder is Announced in Series 1, Sleeping Murder and The Moving Finger in Series 2, At Bertram's Hotel and Nemesis in Series 3, A Pocket Full of Rye and They Do It with Mirrors in Series 4, The Mirror Crack'd from Side to Side in Series 5 and A Caribbean Mystery in Series 6.

In addition, several short stories featuring Miss Marple were adapted into full-length episodes across the series. The Blue Geranium in Series 5, elements of The Herb of Death were incorporated into the adaptation of The Secret of Chimneys in Series 5, while Greenshaw's Folly and The Thumb Mark of St. Peter were combined into one story for Series 6.

Across the twenty-three adaptations, many changes have been made from the source material.

- The Body in the Library inserts a lesbian affair and changes the identity of one of the killers.
- The Murder at the Vicarage removes or changes some minor characters and manufactures Miss Marple's early life.
- 4:50 from Paddington removes one character's death and simplifies the killer's motive.
- A Murder Is Announced changes some of the characters and inserts a lesbian relationship.
- Sleeping Murder changes the killer's motive, some characters backstory, inserts a central romantic relationship, and side plot involving a travelling band of singers.
- The Moving Finger changes the time period and some character backstory, including the addition of a suicide attempt by the narrating character and two other characters in a gay relationship.
- By the Pricking of My Thumbs inserts Miss Marple into what was originally a Tommy and Tuppence novel, and therefore changes many plot elements, including Tommy and Tuppence's relationship, adding characters, subplots, and changing the time period.
- The Sittaford Mystery is very loosely based on the novel, but inserts Miss Marple and changes the identity of the killer.
- At Bertram's Hotel is only loosely based on the novel, changing many elements of the plot, characters and time period.
- Ordeal by Innocence includes significant changes to the characters, inserting Miss Marple into the story.
- Towards Zero is largely faithful to the original novel but inserts Miss Marple into the story and changes some characters.
- Nemesis is only loosely based on the novel, and changes characters and setting.
- A Pocket Full of Rye is a faithful adaptation of the novel, with only minor changes to the characters.
- Murder Is Easy is very loosely based on the novel, inserting Miss Marple and changing the murderer's motive.
- They Do It with Mirrors combines some characters and adds an arson attack.
- Why Didn't They Ask Evans? is only loosely based on the novel, inserting Miss Marple and changing the plot and characters.
- The Pale Horse is very loosely based on the novel and inserts Miss Marple.
- The Secret of Chimneys is very loosely based on the novel (which did not include Miss Marple) and uses elements from the Miss Marple short story The Herb of Death. It also changes the killer's identity.
- The Blue Geranium is greatly embellished from the original short story.
- The Mirror Crack'd from Side to Side keeps closely to the original story.
- A Caribbean Mystery keeps closely to the original story, apart from the inclusion of real-life novelist Ian Fleming and ornithologist James Bond.
- Greenshaw's Folly combines the short story with elements from The Thumb Mark of St. Peter. The story is embellished, but keeps to the core of the original works.
- Endless Night is a faithful adaptation of the novel (which did not include Miss Marple), but the story is very similar to The Case of The Caretaker.

== Worldwide distribution ==
Agatha Christie's Marple was originally aired in the United States on PBS within the anthology series Mystery!, where it is presented as Agatha Christie's "Miss Marple", before airing on the anthology series Masterpiece Theatre. The series is broadcast to the whole of Canada on CBC and in French on Radio-Canada. In Australia, Agatha Christie's Marple airs on ABC1.

Marple is also being broadcast on ATV World in Hong Kong, on EBS and MegaTV in South Korea and on CCTV-8 in China. China, however, refused to show The Body in the Library and Murder Is Easy, due to the involvement of a lesbian and an incestuous relationship respectively. Why Didn't They Ask Evans? was extensively edited, due to the involvement of War-period China.

In Norway, the series has been airing on state broadcaster NRK1 as "Miss Marple". In Sweden, Marple airs on TV4, the biggest commercial TV station. In Poland, the series airs on Ale Kino+. In the Czech Republic it is broadcast under the title Slečna Marplová, Czech for "Miss Marple".

In Brazil, the series airs on HBO Brasil. In the Netherlands it is broadcast on BBC First.

== Reception ==
=== Ratings ===
Series	No.	Title	Air date	Ratings		Ave. ratings		Ref.
Series	No.	Title	Air date	Viewers	Rank	Viewers	Rank	Ref.
1	1	The Body in the Library	12 December 2004	8.72	14	7.70	15	
1	2	The Murder at the Vicarage	19 December 2004	8.36	11	7.70	15	
1	3	4:50 from Paddington	26 December 2004	5.95	22	7.70	15	
1	4	A Murder Is Announced	2 January 2005	7.78	14	7.70	15	
2	1	Sleeping Murder	5 February 2006	8.74	12	7.79	13	
2	2	The Moving Finger	12 February 2006	7.89	14	7.79	13	
2	3	By the Pricking of My Thumbs	19 February 2006	7.93	14	7.79	13	
2	4	The Sittaford Mystery	30 April 2006	6.58	13	7.79	13	
3	1	At Bertram's Hotel	23 September 2007	5.41	17	5.32	19	
3	2	Ordeal by Innocence	30 September 2007	5.54	19	5.32	19	
3	3	Towards Zero	3 August 2008	5.84	11	5.32	19	
3	4	Nemesis	1 January 2009	4.48	27	5.32	19	
4	1	A Pocket Full of Rye	6 September 2009	5.39	14	4.92	15	
4	2	Murder Is Easy	13 September 2009	4.86	16	4.92	15	
4	3	They Do It with Mirrors	1 January 2010	5.55	12	4.92	15	
4	4	Why Didn't They Ask Evans?	15 June 2011	3.86	16	4.92	15	
5	1	The Pale Horse	30 August 2010	4.97	15	4.99	15	
5	2	The Secret of Chimneys	27 December 2010	4.69	16	4.99	15	
5	3	The Blue Geranium	29 December 2010	5.71	13	4.99	15	
5	4	The Mirror Crack'd from Side to Side	2 January 2011	4.58	17	4.99	15	
6	1	A Caribbean Mystery	16 June 2013	4.31	13	4.42	14	
6	2	Greenshaw's Folly	23 June 2013	4.39	14	4.42	14	
6	3	Endless Night	29 December 2013	4.57	14	4.42	14	

=== Awards and nominations ===
In 2005, Geraldine McEwan was nominated for a Satellite Award for Best Actress – Miniseries or Television Film for her performance in Series 1. The series was also nominated for a Primetime Emmy Award for Outstanding Special Class Program, in 2005. In 2006, series composer, Dominik Scherrer was the winner of a Gold Medal at the New York Festivals for TV Programming & Promotion - Craft: Program - Best Original Music/Lyrics, as well as receiving an Ivor Novello Award nomination for Best Television Soundtrack, in 2011. The series was Inducted into the Online Film & Television Association – Television Hall of Fame: Productions, in 2014.

== Home media ==
In the United States, Agatha Christie's Marple was made available on DVD from Acorn Media, where the entire series is available in individual sets, and a set containing the first three series. The series has been released in its entirety, in both individual and complete sets, in the UK, via ITV DVD, and in Australia, originally from ABC DVD, then Roadshow Entertainment. The series will, for the first time, receive a Blu-ray release, consisting of the first three series in a limited edition set from ViaVision in Australia, in 2024. In Germany, the DVDs were distributed by Polyband/WVG in individual sets, a complete limited edition set, followed by a complete standard edition set.

Series	Release date				
Series	Region 1	Region 2 (UK)	Region 2 (Germany)	Region 4 (Note: Series 1–5 were re-released individually on 3 April 2013 in a new style off DVD artwork. The same artwork used for the premiere release of Series 6 (2014).)	Region B (Blu-ray Australia)
Series 1	24 May 2005	14 March 2005	27 September 2019	7 April 2005 (Note: Series 1 was originally released in the four episodes over four individual dvds. They were all re-released in 2007 within a slip box.)	—N/a
Series 2	29 August 2006	17 July 2006	29 November 2019	1 August 2007	—N/a
Series 3	9 October 2007	6 October 2008	31 January 2020	1 April 2010	—N/a
Series 4	4 August 2009	4 January 2010	27 March 2020	4 November 2010	—N/a
Series 5	31 August 2010	20 June 2011	26 June 2020	3 November 2011	—N/a
Series 6	30 September 2014	6 January 2014	28 August 2020	2 April 2014	—N/a
Collection sets
Series 1 & 2	—N/a	17 July 2006	—N/a	7 November 2007	—N/a
Series 1–3	2 November 2010	31 May 2010	—N/a	8 July 2020	4 December 2024
Series 1–4	—N/a	16 August 2010	—N/a	—N/a	—N/a
Series 1–5	—N/a	15 August 2011	—N/a	—N/a	—N/a
Series 4–6	—N/a	—N/a	—N/a	17 February 2021	—N/a
Series 1–6	—N/a	13 January 2014	13 November 2020 (Note: In addition to the 2020 limited edition set, the complete series was re-released in a standard edition set on 26 March 2021.)	6 October 2021	—N/a
