= The Patrick and Maureen Maybe Music Experience =

- Genre: Sitcom
- Running time: 30 minutes
- Country of origin: United Kingdom
- Language: English
- Home station: BBC Radio 4
- Starring: Patrick Barlow; Imelda Staunton
- Written by: Patrick Barlow (writer)
- Produced by: Clare Jones
- Original release: 5 January – 26 January 1999
- No. of series: 1
- No. of episodes: 4
- Website: At BBC Radio 4

The Patrick and Maureen Maybe Music Experience was a radio situation comedy, initially broadcast on BBC Radio 4. It starred Patrick Barlow and Imelda Staunton (who had previously worked together in a TV sitcom, Is It Legal? in 1996) as the bickering hosts of their own radio program. The show was written by Patrick Barlow, who is also the creator of the National Theatre of Brent, in which he, in his alter ego of Desmond Olivier Dingle, serves as artistic director and chief actor.

Patrick and Maureen Maybe (Barlow and Staunton) are the hosts of their own radio program: The Patrick and Maureen Maybe Music Experience. Patrick is a husband with a roving eye, his wife Maureen is insanely jealous, and the guests who visit their programme are invariably humiliated and/or in tears by the end of the evening.

== Cast ==
- Patrick Maybe - Patrick Barlow
- Maureen Maybe - Imelda Staunton
- Doctor Willow-Withings - Peter Jones

== Episodes ==
- 1-1 - Stella Gonet and Jack Davenport are the guests. Broadcast 5 January 1999
- 1-2 - Juliet Stevenson and Leonie Mellinger are the guests. Broadcast 12 January 1999
- 1-3 - Mike Smith and Sarah Greene are the guests. Broadcast 19 January 1999
- 1-4 - The guest is Rachel Weisz. Broadcast 26 January 1999
