= The Arts and How They Was Done =

- Genre: Comedy
- Running time: 30 mins
- Country of origin: United Kingdom
- Language: English
- Home station: BBC Radio 4
- Original release: 4 April – 9 May 2007
- No. of series: 1
- No. of episodes: 6
- Website: Website

The Arts and How They Was Done was a comedy radio programme that aired from April 2007-May 2007, featuring Desmond Olivier Dingle and the entire National Theatre of Brent, Raymond Box. There were six half-hour episodes and it was broadcast on BBC Radio 4. It starred Patrick Barlow and John Ramm, and was directed by Martin Duncan.

== Episode list ==
Episode	Title	Original Airdate
1	The Birth of Art and How They Done The Cave Paintings	4 April 2007
2	How Michelangelo Done The Sistine Chapel	11 April 2007
3	The Taj Mahal And How It Was Done	18 April 2007
4	The Brontë Sisters And How They Done Their Novels	25 April 2007
5	How Puccini Done Madam Butterfly	2 May 2007
6	The Entire History of Theatre Through the Ages and How It Is Done	9 May 2007

== Notes and references ==
- Lavalie, John (21 July 2005). "The Arts and How They Was Done". Epguides.
