= The Blue Geranium =

The Blue Geranium may refer to:

- A short story in the book The Thirteen Problems, by Agatha Christie.
- An episode in the 5th series of ITV's Agatha Christie's Marple, see List of Agatha Christie's Marple episodes.
