= The Sittaford Mystery =

1931 mystery novel by Agatha Christie

- Dust-jacket illustration of the US (true first) edition. See Publication history (below) for UK first edition jacket image.
- Author: Agatha Christie
- Language: English
- Genre: Crime novel
- Publisher: Dodd, Mead and Company
- Publication date: 1931
- Publication place: United States
- Media type: Print (hardback & paperback)
- Pages: 308 (first edition, hardcover)

The Sittaford Mystery is a mystery novel by British writer Agatha Christie, first published in the US by Dodd, Mead and Company in 1931 under the title of The Murder at Hazelmoor and in UK by the Collins Crime Club on 7 September of the same year under Christie's original title. It is the first Christie novel to be given a different title for the US market. The US edition retailed at $2.00 and the UK edition at seven shillings and sixpence (7/6).

Mrs Willett and her daughter host an evening of "table-turning" (a séance) on a snowy winter's evening in Dartmoor. The spirit tells them that Captain Trevelyan is dead. The roads being impassable to vehicles, Major Burnaby announces his intention to go to the village on foot to check on his friend, where he appears to find the prediction has come true. Emily Trefusis, engaged to Trevelyan's nephew, uncovers the mystery along with the police.

The novel was well received, with praise for the character Miss Emily Trefusis. The references to Sir Arthur Conan Doyle, no longer alive when the book was published, and the elements of the setting that hearken to The Hound of the Baskervilles (published in 1902) were also noted and appreciated.

== Plot summary ==
Sittaford is a tiny village on the fringe of Dartmoor. Mrs Willett and her daughter Violet are the newly installed tenants of Sittaford House, a residence owned by Trevelyan, a retired Navy captain. They invite four people to tea on Friday afternoon: Captain Trevelyan's long-standing friend, Major Burnaby, Mr Rycroft, Mr Ronnie Garfield, and Mr Duke. At the suggestion of Mr Garfield, the six of them decide to play a game of table-turning. During this séance, at 5.25 pm, a spirit announces that Captain Trevelyan has just been murdered. Concerned for the Captain's safety in Exhampton, Major Burnaby says that he intends to walk the 6 mi (9.7 km) there. There is a thick layer of snow on the ground and further heavy snowfall is forecast for later that evening. There is no telephone in Sittaford, and cars cannot manoeuvre in these conditions.

Two and a half hours later, just before 8 pm, in the middle of a blizzard, Major Burnaby is trudging up the path to the front door of Hazelmoor, the house in Exhampton where Captain Trevelyan now lives. When nobody answers the door, he fetches the local police and a doctor. They enter the house through the open study window at the back, and find Captain Trevelyan's dead body on the floor. Dr Warren estimates the time of death at between 5 and 6 pm. A fracture of the base of the skull is the cause of death. The weapon was a green baize tube full of sand.

Captain Trevelyan's will states that, apart from £100 for his servant Evans, his property is to be equally divided among four people: his sister Jennifer Gardner, his nephew James Pearson, his niece Sylvia Dering, and his nephew Brian Pearson (the three children of his other, deceased sister). Each of these four will inherit approximately £20,000. James Pearson is arrested for murder because he was in Exhampton at the time of the murder, trying unsuccessfully to get a loan from Captain Trevelyan.

While the official investigation is led by Inspector Narracott, James Pearson's fiancée Emily Trefusis starts sleuthing herself. She is assisted by Charles Enderby, a Daily Wire journalist who, after the murder, presented a cheque for £5,000 to Major Burnaby for winning the newspaper's football competition in Exhampton. Emily and Charles stay with Mr and Mrs Curtis in Sittaford, searching for clues. Mr Dacres, James Pearson's solicitor, tells Emily that things look much worse than they already imagined. James has "borrowed" money from his firm to speculate in stocks without the knowledge of the firm.

There are several red herrings. Brian Pearson came under suspicion when Enderby discovered him making a late-night rendezvous with Violet Willett; he is Violet's fiancé. He was not in Australia but had returned to England on the same boat with the Willetts. The Willetts' motive for moving into the isolated Sittaford house had no connection with Captain Trevelyan. They wanted to live close to Dartmoor Prison, where Violet's father was imprisoned. His escape from the prison, three days after the murder, was engineered by Brian Pearson. He and Brian would live with the Willetts as their manservants until the danger passed, but the prisoner was recaptured. Martin Dering created a false alibi because his wife Sylvia was watching him for divorce proceedings. Sylvia is Mr Rycroft's niece; Jennifer Gardner is Mr Garfield's godmother; and Mr Duke is an ex-Chief-Inspector of Scotland Yard.

Emily solves the mystery in Hazelmoor after finding Captain Trevelyan's ski boots hidden in the chimney, and two pairs of skis in different sizes. Major Burnaby is the killer. He engineered the table movements during the séance to make the spirit convey the message that Captain Trevelyan had been murdered. Instead of walking the six miles in two and a half hours after the séance, he went to his own house to put on skis, and skied the distance in about 10 minutes. He killed Captain Trevelyan at about a quarter to six. Then he cleaned his skis and put them in the cupboard. He hid Trevelyan's ski boots in the chimney to prevent the police seeing them, and thus possibly realising how quickly a person on skis could have travelled between Sittaford and Exhampton. Major Burnaby hoped that the second pair of skis, of a different size, would pass unnoticed.

Mr Rycroft, who is a member of the Psychical Research Society, reassembles five of the six original participants for a second séance at Sittaford House, the absent Mr Duke being replaced by Brian Pearson. The séance has scarcely begun, when Inspector Narracott steps in, in the company of Emily and Mr Duke, and charges Major Burnaby with the murder of Captain Trevelyan. Emily explains that Burnaby had lost a lot of money by buying rotten shares; his motive for the murder was to keep the cheque for £5,000. He had received the letter notifying him of the win on the morning of the day of the murder, contrary to what he told Enderby. Captain Trevelyan had won the competition but used Burnaby's name to send in competition solutions. In the final chapter Emily turns down a marriage proposal by Enderby – who has fallen in love with her during the investigation – because she still loves her fiancé James.

== Characters ==
=== Inhabitants of Sittaford ===
- Sittaford House: Mrs Willett and her daughter Violet
- Cottage 1: Major John Edward Burnaby
- Cottage 2: Captain Wyatt and his Indian servant Abdul
- Cottage 3: Mr Rycroft, uncle of Mr Martin Dering
- Cottage 4: Miss Caroline Percehouse and her nephew Ronald Garfield
- Cottage 5: Mr and Mrs Curtis
- Cottage 6: Mr Duke

=== Investigators ===
- Miss Emily Trefusis: James Pearson's fiancée; amateur sleuth
- Mr Charles Enderby: journalist from the Daily Wire; amateur sleuth
- Inspector Narracott: investigator from Exeter
- Superintendent Maxwell: Narracott's boss
- Constable Graves: policeman in Exhampton
- Sgt Pollock: policeman in Exhampton
- Dr Warren: doctor in Exhampton

=== Other ===
- Captain Joseph A. Trevelyan: owner of Sittaford House, tenant of "Hazelmoor" in Exhampton
- Mr Robert Henry Evans: Captain Trevelyan's servant
- Mrs Rebecca Evans: Evans' wife
- Mrs J. Belling: Rebecca's mother, licensed proprietor of "The Three Crowns" in Exhampton
- Williamson & Williamson: estate agents
- Walters & Kirkwood: Captain Trevelyan's solicitors
- Mrs Jennifer Gardner: Captain Trevelyan's sister, lives in "The Laurels" in Exeter, godmother of Mr Ronald Garfield
- Mr Robert Gardner: Jennifer's invalid husband
- Miss Davis: Robert Gardner's nurse
- Beatrice: Mr and Mrs Gardner's maid
- Mr James Pearson: Captain Trevelyan's nephew in London
- Mr Dacres: James Pearson's solicitor
- Mrs Sylvia Dering: Captain Trevelyan's niece
- Mr Martin Dering: Sylvia's husband
- Mr Brian Pearson: Captain Trevelyan's nephew from New South Wales, Australia
- "Freemantle" Freddy: convict in Dartmoor Prison, Princetown

== Literary significance and reception ==
The New York Times Book Review's issue of 16 August 1931 posited that "Mrs. Agatha Christie's latest is up to her usual high standard and compares favourably with The Murder of Roger Ackroyd, one of the best she ever did." They went on to comment that, "Miss Trefusis is one of the sharpest and most likeable detectives of recent moons." Finally they summarised, "An excellent book to take away for week-end reading." In a short review of 23 October 1931, the Daily Mirror said that, "A pair of snow shoes and a prize competition offer clues to the villain, who is well concealed."

Robert Barnard commented: "Mayhem Parva, sharpened by Dartmoor setting and snow. Many of the usual elements are here, but also escaped convict (out of Baskervilles), séances, newspaper competitions and amateur investigator – young woman torn (as in Blue Train) between handsome weakling and hardworking, upright, born-to-success type. Highly entertaining, with adroit clueing." Charles Osborne wrote: "... strongly plotted, and the solution to its puzzles are not likely to be arrived at by deduction on the reader's part. It is also one of Mrs. Christie's most entertaining crime novels, and her use of the Dartmoor background is masterly."

== References to other works ==
The Sittaford Mystery contains several references to The Hound of the Baskervilles by Arthur Conan Doyle.

- Both stories are set in Devon and have a gothic atmosphere imparted by the suggestion that supernatural phenomena might be involved.
- There's an escaped convict from Dartmoor Prison in both stories: "Freemantle" Freddy in one, Selden in the other.
- There's a naturalist in both stories: Mr Rycroft in one, Jack Stapleton in the other.
- In chapter eleven, Charles Enderby says: "That séance business was queer too. I'm thinking of writing that up for the paper. Get opinions from Sir Oliver Lodge and Sir Arthur Conan Doyle and a few actresses and people about it." Conan Doyle was actually an enthusiastic believer in parapsychology, especially in his later years.

== Geographical locations ==
'Exhampton' is readily recognisable as Okehampton. There is a Sittaford Tor on Dartmoor, which gave Christie the name. The physical location of her fictional settlement of Sittaford closely matches that of Belstone, but its description also evokes Throwleigh where Christie owned a house.

== Publication history ==
Dustjacket illustration of the UK First Edition (Book was first published in the US)

- 1931, Dodd Mead and Company (New York), 1931, Hardcover, 308 pp
- 1931, Collins Crime Club (London), 7 September 1931, Hardcover, 256 pp
- 1948, Penguin Books, Paperback, (Penguin number 690), 255 pp
- 1950, Dell Books (New York), Paperback, (Dell number 391 [mapback]), 224 pp
- 1961, Fontana Books (Imprint of HarperCollins), Paperback, 190 pp
- 1973, Ulverscroft Large-print Edition, Hardcover, 387 pp, ISBN 0-85456-203-6
- 2010, HarperCollins; Facsimile edition, Hardcover: 256 pages, ISBN 978-0-00-735459-7

In the US the novel was serialised in Good Housekeeping magazine in six instalments from March (Volume XCII, Number 3) to August 1931 (Volume XCIII, Number 2) under the title The Murder at Hazelmoor with illustrations by W. Smithson Broadhead.

=== Book dedication ===
The book's dedication reads: "To M.E.M. With whom I discussed the plot of this book to the alarm of those around us." The subject of this dedication is Christie's second husband, Max Mallowan (1904–1978) and is one of four books dedicated to him, either singly or jointly, the others being Murder on the Orient Express (1934), Come Tell Me How You Live (1946) and Christie's final written work, Postern of Fate (1973).

In 1928, Christie had been planning a holiday to the West Indies when a chance conversation at a dinner party with a Commander Howe of the Royal Navy and his wife, who had just returned from his being stationed in the Persian Gulf, awakened an interest in her in visiting Baghdad, especially when the Howes pointed out that a part of the journey could be made by the famed Orient Express. The Howes also mentioned that not far from Baghdad, an archaeological expedition was uncovering the remains of the ancient city of Ur, about which Christie had been reading with avid interest in The Illustrated London News. Entranced by the thought of such a journey, she changed her tickets at Thomas Cook's and set off for the orient.

On the journey, she found herself in the company of a tedious Englishwoman who was determined to take Christie "under her wing", although that was the last thing she wanted. Desperate to escape she travelled to Ur and made the acquaintance of the archaeological expedition's leader, Leonard Woolley (1880–1960) and his wife, Katharine (1888–1945). Visitors to the dig were usually discouraged but Katharine Woolley was a great admirer of The Murder of Roger Ackroyd and, being an imperious and difficult woman who always got her way in things large and small (Gertrude Bell described Katherine as "dangerous"), Christie was treated as an honoured guest. In 1929, Christie gave the Woolleys the temporary use of her then residence in Cresswell Place in London and they, in turn, invited her back to the dig at the end of the season.

Arriving back there in February 1930, she met Max Mallowan, who had been away ill with appendicitis. Katharine 'ordered' him to take Christie on a tour of the local sights. They visited Nippur, Diwaniyah, Nejeif, Ukhaidir, and Kerbela and on a journey back to Baghdad, their car got stuck in the sand. Mallowan was impressed by the way in which Christie, rather than succumbing to panic in the heat and dust, just lay down in the car's shadow to sleep while a Bedouin went off for help. After being reunited with the Woolleys, most of the party made its way by stages to Greece where Christie received telegrams informing her that her daughter Rosalind (who was in the care of her sister at Abney Hall), was seriously ill with pneumonia. Christie set off for home by a four-day train journey with Max accompanying her. Getting to know her on the journey, he made up his mind to propose marriage and, after a few more meetings, that is what he did to Christie's great shock.

Christie accepted and in doing so was warned to be cautious by her brother-in-law James Watts (1878?–1957) and vehemently opposed in her plans by his wife (Christie's sister) Madge (1879–1950). Their son, Jack Watts (1903–1961) who had been at New College, Oxford with Max was also opposed, supposedly due to mistrust of his new 'uncle'. As The Sittaford Mystery was written during this period, it is probable that this opposition is what the dedication refers to.

=== Dustjacket blurb ===
The blurb on the inside flap of the dustjacket of the first edition (which is also repeated opposite the title page) reads:

It was a typical Dickens Christmas; deep snow everywhere, and down in the little village of Sittaford on the fringe of Dartmoor, probably deeper than anywhere. Mrs Willett, the winter tenant in Captain Trevelyan's country house, was, with her daughter Violet, giving a party. Finally they decided to do a little table rapping and after the usual number of inconsequential messages from the 'other side', suddenly the table announced that Captain Trevelyan was dead. His oldest friend, Captain Burnaby, was disturbed. He quickly left the house and tramped six miles of snowy roads to Exhampton. There was no sign of life in Trevelyan's house. A back window was broken in and the light was burning – and there, on the floor, was the body of Trevelyan. Inspector Narracott took the case in hand, and after wandering through a maze of false clues and suspects, he ultimately discovered the murderer of Captain Trevelyan. Mrs. Christie has never formulated a more ingenious or enthralling plot and her characterisation is of the vivid type which marked The Murder of Roger Ackroyd and The Murder at the Vicarage.

== Adaptations ==
=== Television ===
The novel was nominally adapted by Granada Television as a Miss Marple mystery as part of the Agatha Christie's Marple series (set in 1952). It featured Geraldine McEwan as Miss Marple, who did not appear in the novel. Apart from the names of some characters and locations, the plot bears little resemblance to the original story and a number of anachronistic themes are added. It guest-starred Timothy Dalton as Trevelyan, Patricia Hodge as Mrs Evadne Willett, Carey Mulligan as Violet Willett, Laurence Fox as Jim Pearson, Zoe Telford as Emily Trefusis, James Murray as Charles Burnaby, Mel Smith as John Enderby and Rita Tushingham as Elizabeth Percehouse. It aired in the UK on 30 April 2006.

The novel was also adapted as a 2018 episode of Les Petits Meurtres d'Agatha Christie. SonyLIV, in association with Agatha Christie Limited released Charlie Chopra, a Hindi web series based on the novel, in July 2023.

=== Radio ===
A five-part radio adaptation was first broadcast on BBC Radio 4 in 1990 featuring Melinda Walker as Emily Trefusis, Stephen Tompkinson as Charles Enderby, John Moffatt as Mr Rycroft and Geoffrey Whitehead as Inspector Narracott.
