= Why Didn't They Ask Evans? =

1934 mystery novel by Agatha Christie

- Dust-jacket illustration of the first UK edition
- Author: Agatha Christie
- Cover artist: Gilbert Cousland
- Language: English
- Genre: Crime novel
- Publisher: Collins Crime Club
- Publication date: September 1934
- Publication place: United Kingdom
- Media type: Print (hardback & paperback)
- Pages: 256 (first edition, hardcover)
- Preceded by: The Listerdale Mystery
- Followed by: Parker Pyne Investigates

Why Didn't They Ask Evans? is a mystery novel by Agatha Christie, first published in the United Kingdom by the Collins Crime Club in September 1934 and in the United States by Dodd, Mead and Company in 1935 under the title of The Boomerang Clue. The UK edition retailed at seven shillings and sixpence (7/6) and the US edition at $2.00.

The novel is set in Wales and Hampshire. Bobby Jones finds a man dying at his local golf course. A photo he saw in the man's pocket is replaced, as police seek his identity. Bobby and his friend Lady Frances Derwent have adventures as they solve the mystery of the man's last words: "Why didn't they ask Evans?"

The novel was praised at first publication as "a story that tickles and tantalises", and that the reader is sure to like the amateur detectives and forgive the absence of Poirot. It had a lively narrative, full of action, with two amateur detectives who "blend charm and irresponsibility with shrewdness and good luck". Robert Barnard, writing in 1990, called it "Lively" but compared it to Evelyn Waugh's Vile Bodies and felt that the detectives were too much the amateurs.

== Plot ==
Bobby Jones is playing golf with Dr Thomas in the Welsh seaside town of Marchbolt. Upon hearing what sounds like a scream, he peers over the edge of the cliff and sees a man lying on the rocks below. Bobby climbs down to the man, then calls up to the doctor to go for help. He stays with the dying man, who briefly regains consciousness and says "Why didn't they ask Evans?,” before he dies.

Bobby finds a photograph of a beautiful woman in the man's coat pocket, but nothing to identify the man himself. Bobby is needed at his father's church to play the organ, so another man, Roger Bassington-ffrench, a stranger who is wearing plus fours, offers to stay with the body.

At the inquest into the death, the man’s sister, Amelia Cayman, identifies him as Alex Pritchard. She is said to be the woman in the photograph (though Bobby wonders how such a beautiful girl could become such a coarse older woman). After the inquest, Mrs. Cayman and her husband ask if Pritchard had any last words. Bobby says no somewhat hesitantly but later, when talking with his friend Lady Frances "Frankie" Derwent, Bobby remembers Pritchard's final words and writes to the Caymans to tell them.

Bobby receives and rejects an unexpected job offer from a firm in Buenos Aires. Soon afterward he nearly dies after drinking from a poisoned bottle of beer. The local police do not investigate this incident, but Frankie thinks someone has tried to murder Bobby.

When Bobby sees the issue of the local paper with the photograph used to find Pritchard's sister, he sees that it is not the one he found in the dead man's pocket. He and Frankie realise that Bassington-ffrench swapped the photographs and that Mrs Cayman is not related to the dead man. Bobby and Frankie trace Bassington-ffrench to Merroway Court in Hampshire, owned by Roger's brother and sister-in-law, Henry and Sylvia. They stage a car accident outside the house with the help of a doctor friend so that Frankie, feigning injury, will be invited to stay to recover. Frankie produces a newspaper cutting about the mysterious dead man; Sylvia remarks that he looks like Alan Carstairs, a traveller and big-game hunter who was a friend of John Savage, a millionaire who killed himself after learning he had terminal cancer.

Frankie meets two neighbours of the Bassington-ffrenches – Dr Nicholson, who runs a local sanatorium, and his younger wife, Moira. Investigating in the grounds at night, Bobby encounters a woman who says that she fears for her life; she is the woman whose photograph Bobby found in the dead man's pocket. Several days later, Moira Nicholson turns up at the local inn where Bobby stays in his disguise as Frankie's chauffeur. She says her husband is trying to kill her and says she knew Alan Carstairs before her marriage to the doctor. Moira suggests that Bobby and Frankie ask Roger if he took the photograph from the body of the dead man. Roger admits that he took the photo, recognising Moira and wanting to avoid scandal for her. Frankie leaves after Henry Bassington-ffrench is found dead in his home, an apparent suicide.

Interested in the will of the late John Savage, Frankie consults her family's solicitor in London and learns that Carstairs had consulted him too. Savage was staying with Mr and Mrs Templeton when he became convinced he had cancer, although one specialist told him he was perfectly well. When he died by suicide, he left in his will some donations to charity and seven hundred thousand pounds to Mrs Templeton, who has apparently since left Britain. The will was signed by two witnesses - the cook and the gardener of the Templeton's residence - as well as the lawyer, so there was no doubt about its correctness; Carstairs was on their trail when he was killed. Bobby is kidnapped while checking and lurking at the Grange; Frankie is lured to the same isolated cottage by Roger disguised as Dr. Nicholson, where she is captured and tied up with Bobby in the attic. Bobby and Frankie are rescued by the timely and unexpected arrival of Badger Beadon, and they turn the tables on Roger; they also find a drugged Moira in the house. When the police arrive, Roger has escaped.

Bobby and Frankie trace the Templetons' former cook and gardener, witnesses to John Savage's will. Mr Templeton is also known as Mr Leo Cayman. The cook says that Gladys, the parlourmaid, was not asked to witness the will, made the night before Savage died. Frankie realises that the cook and gardener did not see Mr Savage before the signing, while the parlourmaid did and would have realised that it was Roger in the "deathbed" who wrote the will and not Mr Savage. The parlourmaid is Gladys Evans, hence the reason for Carstairs' question, "Why didn't they ask Evans?"

Tracing the parlourmaid, they discover she is now the married housekeeper at Bobby's home. Carstairs was trying to find her. Returning to Wales, they find Moira, who claims she is being followed by Roger and has come to them for help. Frankie is not deceived by Moira's behaviour and foils her attempt to poison their coffee, realising that Moira was Mrs Templeton and is Roger's co-conspirator. Moira then attempts to shoot Frankie and Bobby in the café, but is overpowered and arrested. Several weeks later, Frankie receives a letter from Roger, posted from South America, in which he confesses to murdering Savage, Carstairs and his brother Henry Bassington-ffrench, and conspiring in all of Moira's past crimes. Bobby and Frankie realise they are in love and become engaged.

== Characters ==
- Robert "Bobby" Jones: fourth son of the Vicar of Marchbolt, 28 years old, living at the vicarage
- Lady Frances "Frankie" Derwent: daughter of the Earl of Marchington
- Dr Thomas: golfing partner of Bobby
- The Vicar of Marchbolt: Bobby's father
- Alex Pritchard: man who died on the cliffs near Marchbolt, revealed to be Alan Carstairs, a friend of John Savage
- Mr Leo and Mrs Amelia Cayman: supposed brother-in-law and sister of Alex Pritchard; Leo Cayman is Mr Templeton
- "Badger" Beadon: stammering friend of Bobby and owner of a garage in London. He was at Oxford with Roger Bassington-ffrench
- George Arbuthnot: doctor and a friend of Frankie
- Henry Bassington-ffrench: wealthy Englishman who lives in Merroway Court in Hampshire, lately a drug addict, who died at his home
- Sylvia Bassington-ffrench: American wife of Henry who takes a liking to Frankie
- Thomas Bassington-ffrench: their young son
- Roger Bassington-ffrench: Henry's younger brother who takes a fancy to Frankie; he did impersonate John Savage
- Dr Nicholson: Canadian owner of a sanatorium near Merroway Court
- Moira Nicholson: his wife; also Mrs Templeton
- John Savage: millionaire big-game hunter who stayed with the Templetons and died under mysterious circumstances
- Mr and Mrs Templeton: friends of John Savage at the end of his life; Mr Templeton is Leo Cayman
- Mrs Rivington: friend of John Savage who knows Sylvia Bassington-ffrench, and brought Mr Carstairs to dinner at her home
- Gladys Roberts: former parlourmaid to Mr and Mrs Templeton when she was Gladys Evans, now staff with her husband to the Vicar of Marchbolt
- Rose Pratt: former cook to Mr and Mrs Templeton and witness to the last will of "John Savage"
- Albert Mere: former gardener to Mr and Mrs Templeton and witness to the last will of "John Savage"

== Insight into how the title originated ==
In the introduction of Agatha Christie's book Passenger to Frankfurt (Dodd, Mead hardcover, 1970) she gives examples of how she has come up with ideas for her books. Included is this explanation: "You go to tea with a friend. As you arrive, her brother closes a book he is reading – throws it aside, says: 'Not bad, but why on earth didn't they ask Evans?' So you decide immediately a book of yours shortly to be written will bear the title, Why Didn't They Ask Evans? You don't know yet who Evans is going to be. Never mind. Evans will come in due course – the title is fixed."

== Allusions to real people ==
The name of the novel's hero – Bobby Jones – is the same as that of the American golfer who was at the height of his fame at the time of publication. The first chapter introduces "Bobby Jones" playing golf; when his stroke scuds disappointingly along the ground, the narrative explains this Bobby is not the American master.

== Reception ==
The Times Literary Supplement (27 September 1934) concluded favourably, "Mrs Christie describes the risks (Bobby Jones and Frankie Derwent) ran in her lightest and most sympathetic manner, playing with her characters as a kitten will play with a ball of wool, and imposing no greater strain on her readers than the pleasure of reading at a sitting a story that tickles and tantalises but never exhausts their patience or ingenuity".

Isaac Anderson in The New York Times Book Review (18 September 1935) concluded, "Frankie and Bobby are not nearly so brilliant as amateur detectives usually are in books, but you are sure to like them, and you may even be able to forgive Agatha Christie for leaving out Hercule Poirot just this once".

The Observer (16 September 1934) started off by saying that, "there is an engaging zest about Agatha Christie's latest novel" and concluded that, "the narrative is lively" and "the story is full of action".

Milward Kennedy in his review in The Guardian of 21 September 1934 said after summarising the set-up of the plot that, "Poirot has no part in this book; instead, a young man and a young woman who blend charm and irresponsibility with shrewdness and good luck contrive amusingly and successfully to usurp the functions of the police. The fault which I find is the overimportance of luck. For the villains it was, for example, singular good luck which enabled them to discover and identify an obscure vicar's fourth son asleep on a solitary picnic; it was very bad luck for them that he was able to assimilate a sixteenth times fatal dose of morphia. They were lucky, again, in having always at hand just the properties required to make an extempore murder seem something else; and as for the Bright Young Couple – but these are defects which are little noticeable in the gay stream of Mrs Christie's narrative. Perhaps I should not have noticed them had I not read the book so quickly that, in a secluded village, there was nothing for it next day but to read it again with a sterner eye but no less enjoyment".

Robert Barnard wrote of the book in 1980 that it was "Lively, with occasional glimpses of a Vile Bodies world, though one short on Waugh's anarchic humour and long on snobbery ('Nobody looks at a chauffeur the way they look at a person')." His critique was that the novel was "Weakened by lack of proper detective: the investigating pair are bumbling amateurs, with more than a touch of Tommy and Tuppence".

== Publication history ==
- 1933, The McCall Company (abridged version as part of Six Redbook Novels), 1933
- 1934, Collins Crime Club (London), September 1934, Hardcover, 256 pp (priced at 7/6 – seven shillings and sixpence)
- 1935, Dodd Mead and Company (New York), 1935, Hardcover, 290 pp as The Boomerang Clue (priced at $2.00).
- 1944, Dell Books (New York), Paperback, (Dell number 46 [mapback]), 224 pp
- 1956, Fontana Books (Imprint of HarperCollins), Paperback, 192 pp
- 1968, Greenway edition of collected works (William Collins), Hardcover, 288 pp
- 1968, Greenway edition of collected works (Dodd Mead and Company), Hardcover, 288 pp
- 1974, Ulverscroft Large-print Edition, Hardcover, 394 pp ISBN 0-85456-270-2
- 1978, Pan, Paperback, 188pp ISBN 0-330-10736-4
- 1980, Pan Books in association with Collins, 188pp ISBN 0330107364
- 2012, 2022, William Morrow (imprint of HarperCollins), Paperback, 304pp ISBN 9780062074126

The novel was first published in the US in the Redbook magazine in a condensed version in the issue for November 1933 (Volume 62, Number 1) under the title The Boomerang Clue with illustrations by Joseph Franké. This version was then published in Six Redbook Novels by The McCall Company in 1933, prior to the publication of the full text by Dodd Mead in 1935. The other five condensed novels in this volume were The Thin Man by Dashiell Hammett, The Figure in the Fog by Mignon G. Eberhart, The Cross of Peace by Philip Gibbs, White Piracy by James Warner Bellah and Parade Ground by Charles L Clifford.

=== Book dedication ===
The dedication of the book reads:
"To Christopher Mallock
in memory of Hinds"

The Mallock family were friends of Christie's from the years before her first marriage. They staged amateur theatricals at their house, Cockington Court, near Torquay in which Christie, managing to overcome her usual crippling shyness, took part. The allusion to Hinds is unknown.

=== Dustjacket blurb ===
The blurb on the inside flap of the dustjacket of the first UK edition (which is also repeated opposite the title page) reads:

"Believe it or not, Bobby Jones had topped his drive! He was badly bunkered. There were no eager crowds to groan with dismay. That is easily explained – for Bobby was merely the fourth son of the Vicar of Marchbolt, a small golfing resort on the Welsh coast. And Bobby, in spite of his name, was not much of a golfer. Still, that game was destined to be a memorable one. On going to play his ball, Bobby suddenly came upon the body of a man. He bent over him. The man was not yet dead. "Why didn't they ask Evans?" he said, and then the eyelids dropped, the jaw fell...
It was the beginning of a most baffling mystery. That strange question of the dying man is the recurring theme of Agatha Christie's magnificent story. Read it and enjoy it."

=== International titles ===
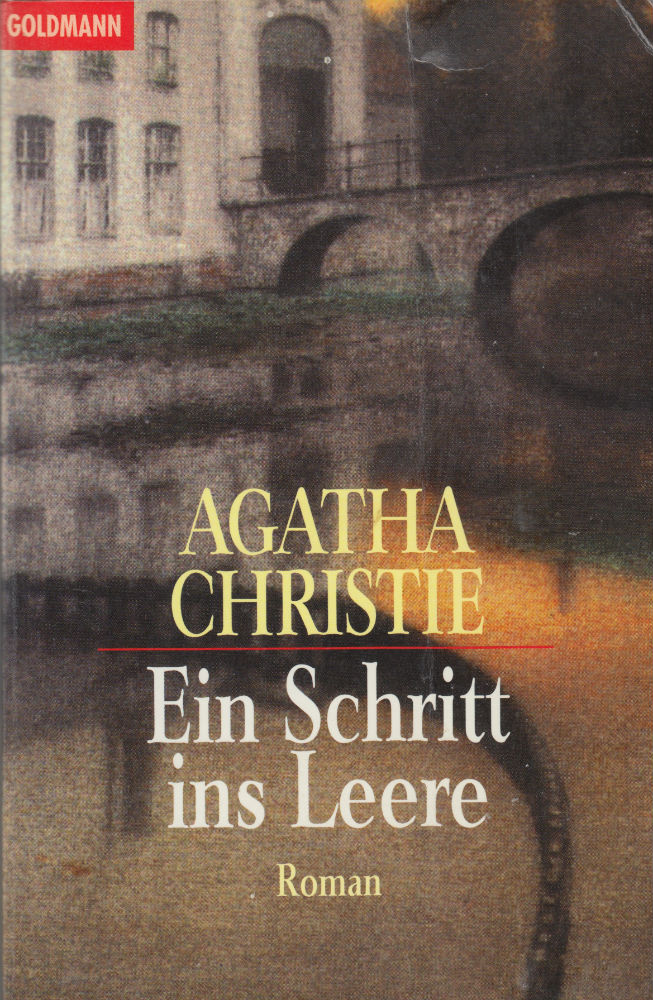
1997 German translation

This novel has been translated into various languages other than its original English. Twenty-six are listed here, some published as recently as 2014. This is in keeping with the author's reputation for being the most translated author.

- Bulgarian: Защо не повикаха Евънс? /Zashto ne povikaha Evans?/
- Catalan: La cursa del bumerang translator Esteve Riambau, 1996, Barcelona: Columna ISBN 978-8482563008
- Chinese: 悬崖上的谋杀 /Xuan ya shang de mou sha translators Lisidi Ke, Gang Ye, 2010, Beijing: Ren min wen xue chu ban she ISBN 978-7020081806
- Czech: Proč nepožádali Evanse?
- Danish: Hvorfor spurgte de ikke Evans? translator Michael Alring, 1999, Copenhagen: Peter Asschenfeldts nye Forlag ISBN 978-8778802996
- Dutch: Waarom Evans niet?
- Estonian: Miks nad ei kutsunud Evansit?
- Finnish: "Askel tyhjyyteen" translator Kirsti Kattelus, 1989, Helsinki: WSOY ISBN 978-9510155172
- French: Pourquoi Pas Evans ? translator Jean Pêcheux, 2014, Paris: Éditions France loisirs ISBN 978-2298085549
- German: Ein Schritt ins Leere, translator Otto Albrecht van Bebber, 2005, Frankfurt am Main: Fischer-Taschenbuch-Verlag ISBN 978-3596168903
- Greek: Οκτώ κόκκοι μορφίνης
- Hebrew: כדור במגרש הגולף (Ball in the Golf Field) 1960 translator unknown. ?מדוע לא ביקשו את אוונס translator: Dov Halachmi 1980
- Hungarian: Miért nem szóltak Evansnek?
- Italian: Perché non l'hanno chiesto a Evans?
- Japanese: 謎のエヴァンズ殺人事件 /Nazo no evuanzu satsujin jiken translator Tadae Fukizawa, 1989, Shinjuku: Shinchosha Publishing ISBN 978-4102135167
- Norwegian: Hvorfor spurte de ikke Evans?
- Polish: Dlaczego nie Evans? translator Katarzyna Kasterka, 2014, Wrocław: Wydawnictwo Dolnośląskie ISBN 978-8324592838
- Portuguese (Brazil): Por que não pediram a Evans?
- Portuguese (Portugal): Perguntem a Evans
- Romanian: De ce nu i-au cerut lui Evans
- Russian: Почему не Эванс /Potchemu ne Evans?/ translator not known, 1998, Warszawa: Proszynski i S-ka ISBN 978-8385661757
- Serbian: Zašto nisu pitali Evansa?, translator Tea Jovanović, 2008, Beograd: Mladinska knjiga ISBN 978-8679281432
- Slovak: Prečo nepožiadali Evans?
- Slovene: Zakaj ne Evans? translator Zoja Skušek, 2012, Ljubljana: Mladinska knjiga ISBN 978-9610118862
- Spanish: Trayectoria de boomerang
- Swedish: Varför bad de inte Evans?. Bonnier. 1984. ISBN 910-0463507.
- Turkish: Ceset dedi ki ... translator Gönül Suveren, 1980s, İstanbul: Altın Kitaplar Yayınevi ISBN 978-9754050097
- Ukrainian: Чому не Еванс? /Chomu ne Evans?/

== Adaptations for television ==
=== 1980 ===
Why Didn't They Ask Evans was adapted by London Weekend Television and transmitted on 30 March 1980. Before this production, there had been relatively few adaptations of Christie's work on the small screen as it was a medium she disliked and she had not been impressed with previous efforts, in particular a transmission of And Then There Were None on 20 August 1949 when several noticeable errors went out live, including one of the "corpses" standing up and walking off set in full view of the cameras. By the 1960s she was emphatically refusing to grant television rights to her works.

After Christie's death in 1976, her estate, principally managed by her daughter Rosalind Hicks, relaxed this ruling and Why Didn't They Ask Evans was the first major production that resulted. Evans attracted large audiences and satisfactory reviews, but more importantly, it demonstrated to television executives that Christie's work could be successful for the small screen given the right budgets, stars and attention to detail – Agatha Christie's Partners in Crime, Miss Marple with Joan Hickson (who had a minor role in Evans), Agatha Christie's Poirot with David Suchet and Marple with Geraldine McEwan, until her retirement, and then with Julia Mackenzie, can all trace their style and successes back to this 1980 adaptation.

Given a generous budget of £1 million, a large sum for the time, it had an all-star cast and a three-month shooting and videotaping schedule. Problems were encountered during the 1979 ITV strike which lasted three months and led to replacement production personnel when the strike ended, including a change of director. The original intention was that the 180-minute teleplay would be transmitted as a three-part "mini-serial", but ITV then decided to show it as a three-hour special with maximum publicity, especially for Francesca Annis in the role of Frankie.

==== Locations ====
Much of the film was taped on location in Cuddington and Long Crendon in Buckinghamshire. Hall Barn, Beaconsfield, Buckinghamshire doubled as the Bassington-ffrench residence and Castle Ashby in Northamptonshire was used as Lady Derwent's home.

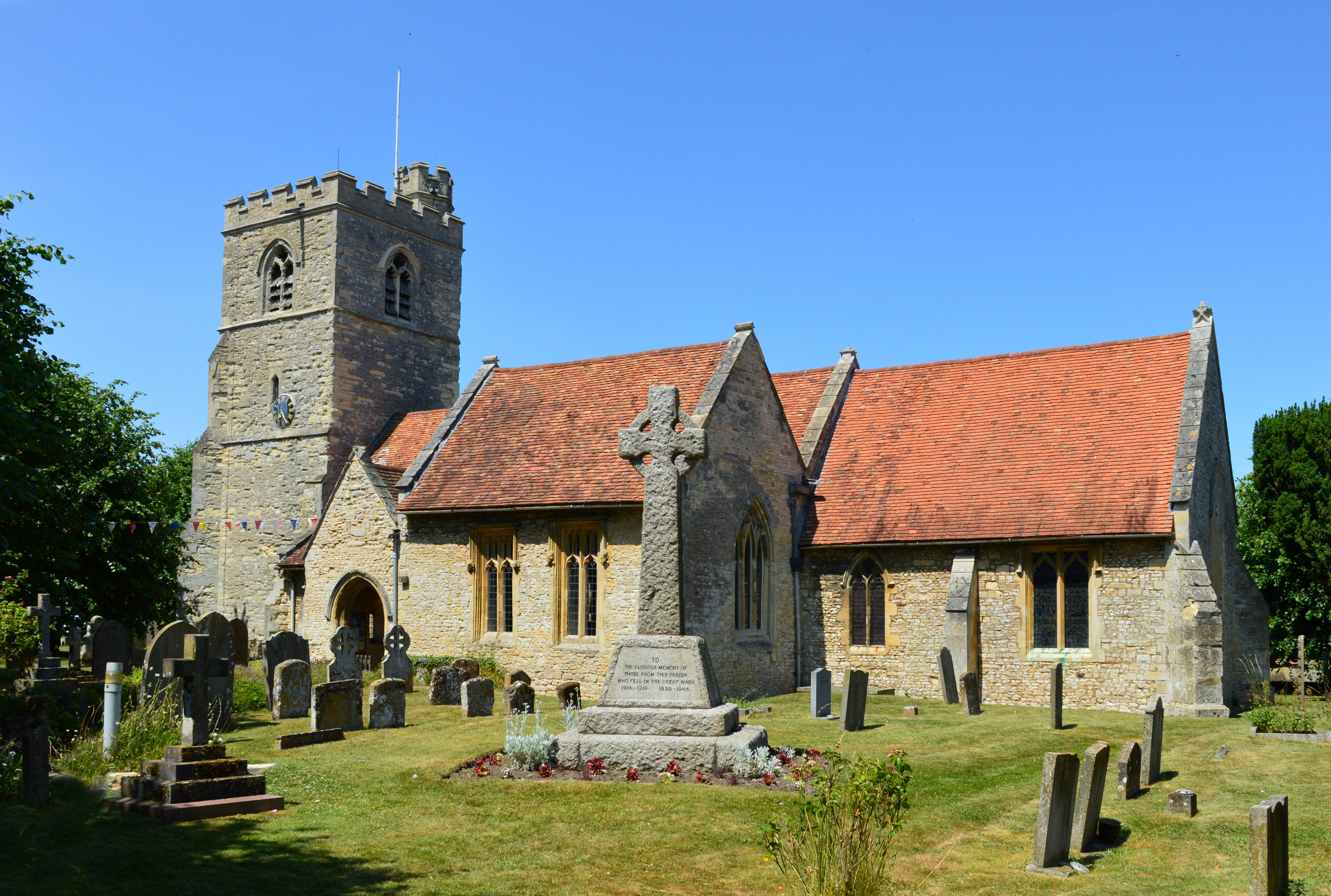
Cuddington church where Bobby's father is vicar

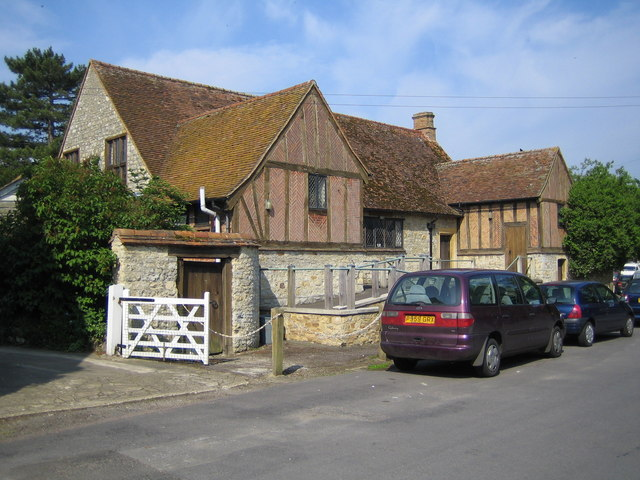
Cuddington location

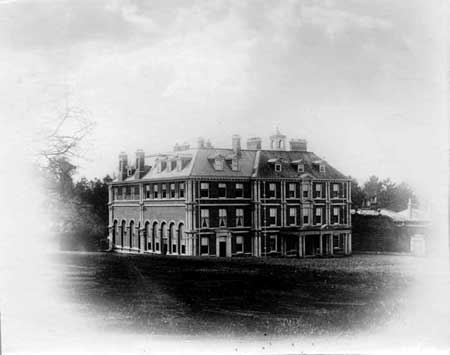
Hall Barn, the Bassington-ffrench home

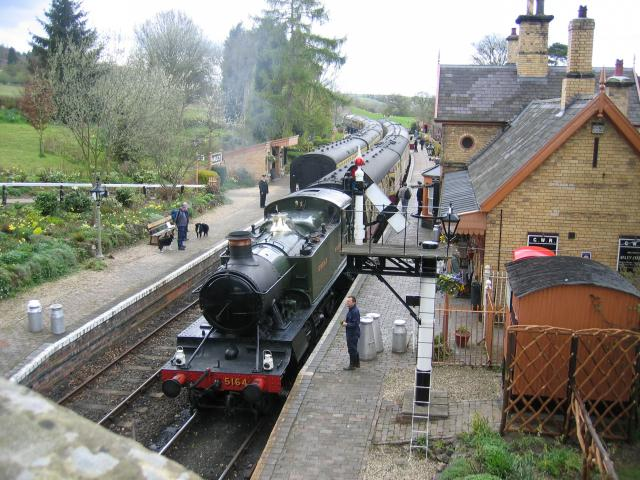
Arley Station was used as a railway station

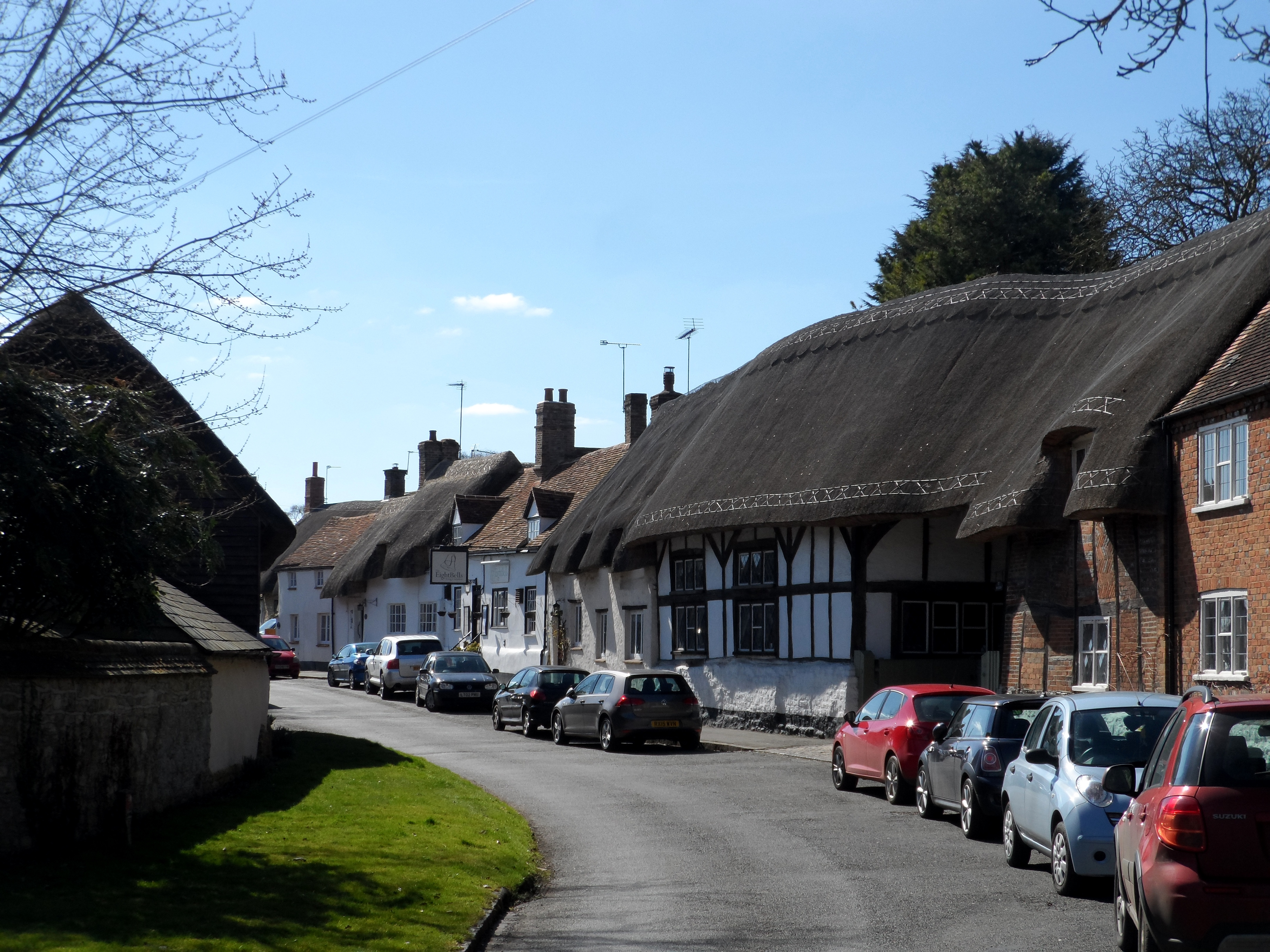
Long Crendon location

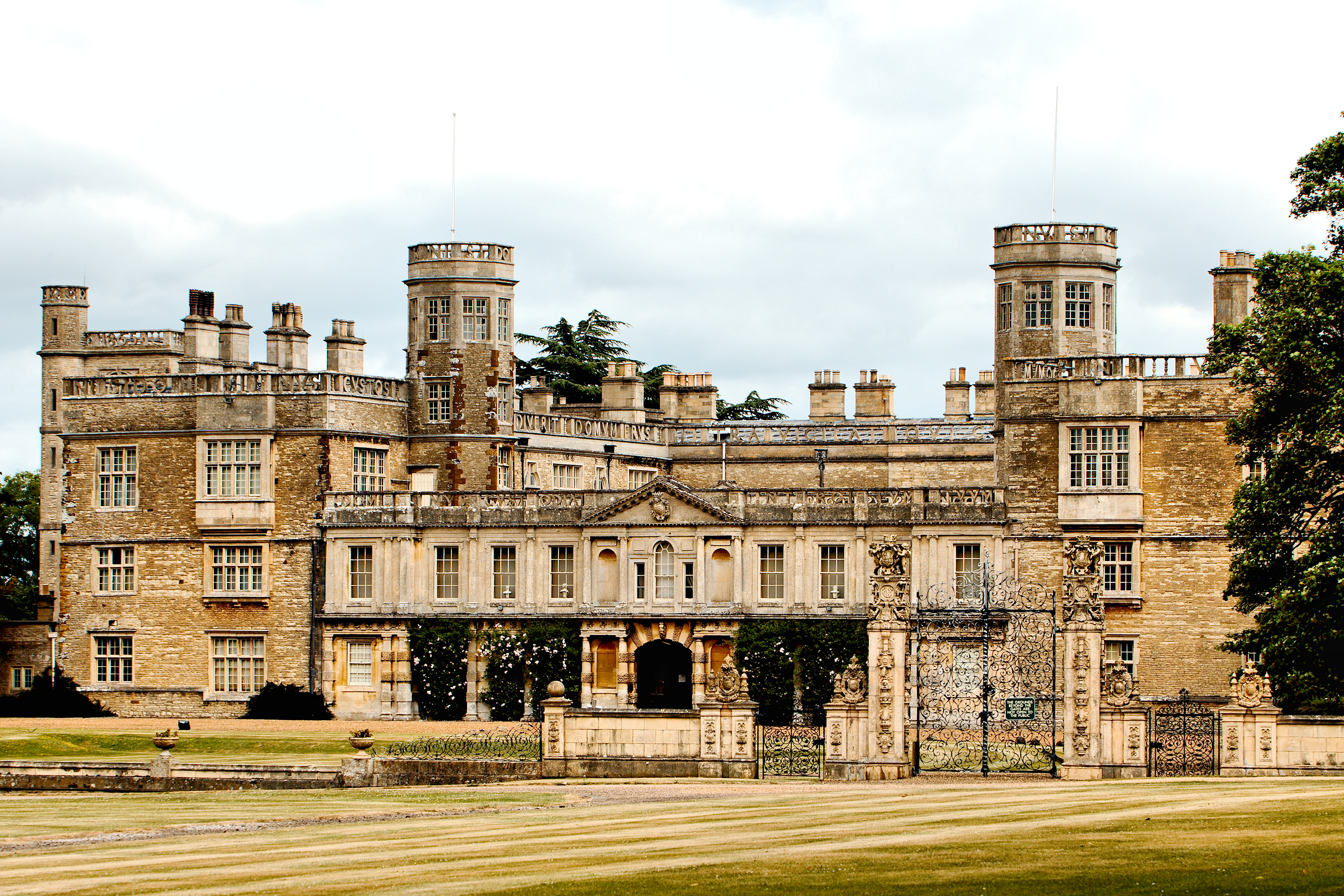
Castle Ashby House

The production was faithful to the plot and dialogue of the book. Two notable changes were made. The first is the recognition in the isolated cottage that Dr Nicholson is Roger Bassington-ffrench in disguise. In the novel, it is Bobby who recognises the deception as the man's ear-lobes are different from those of the doctor whom he had glimpsed previously. In the adaptation, Frankie witnesses one of Nicholson's patients attacking him in the sanatorium when his face is badly scratched. In the cottage, she realises the scratches have disappeared. The second change comes at the end when, instead of writing to Frankie from South America, Roger lures her to a deserted Merroway Court, makes much the same confession as appears in the book's letter and tells her he loves her, asking her to join him. When she refuses, he locks her in a room of the house (to be freed by Bobby the next day) but does not harm her as he makes his escape abroad. The production was first screened on US television as part of Mobil Showcase on 21 May 1981, introduced by Peter Ustinov.

Adaptor: Pat Sandys
Executive Producer: Tony Wharmby
Producer: Jack Williams
Directors: John Davies and Tony Wharmby
Artwork: John Tribe

Principal cast:

- Francesca Annis as Lady Frances (Frankie) Derwent
- Leigh Lawson as Roger Bassington-ffrench
- James Warwick as Bobby Jones
- Connie Booth as Sylvia Bassington-ffrench
- John Gielgud as Reverend Jones
- Bernard Miles as Dr Thomas
- Eric Porter as Dr Nicholson
- Madeline Smith as Moira Nicholson
- Doris Hare as Rose Pratt
- Joan Hickson as Mrs Rivington
- Roy Boyd as Alan Carstairs
- James Cossins as Henry Bassington-ffrench
- Robert Longden as Badger Beadon

=== 2011 ===
Patrick Barlow loosely reworked Christie's novel as a two-hour television film starring Julia McKenzie as Miss Marple, a Christie character who does not appear in the original novel. It was first transmitted on Wednesday, 15 June 2011, on ITV. Among the major changes to the plot:

- Miss Marple is portrayed as a friend of Bobby's mother (Bobby's father does not appear), and joins the investigation while masquerading as Frankie's governess.
- The time period of the book is shifted from the early 1930s to the late 1950s to match the timeframe used by the rest of the ITV Marple series.
- The characters of Leo Cayman, Amelia Cayman, Badger Beadon, Henry Bassington-ffrench, Vicar Jones and Dr Thomas are omitted.
- Thomas Bassington-ffrench is a small boy in the novel, but in the film he is a cold and introverted teenager.
- New characters and subplots are introduced, including Sylvia's two children Tom and Dorothy Savage, Wilson the butler, Commander Peters and Claude Evans. Evans, portrayed as an orchid-grower and a friend of the Savages, is murdered to throw Bobby, Frankie and Miss Marple off the track.
- Sylvia Bassington-ffrench and Alan Carstairs undergo name changes to become Sylvia Savage and John Carstairs, respectively. Sylvia becomes a drug addict in this version, her fixes supplied by Dr Nicholson.
- John Savage (called Jack in this adaptation) is made into Sylvia's husband, who is murdered before the film begins.
- Bobby does not find the body whilst playing golf; he is taking a walk across the cliff. The attempt on his life is by running his bicycle off the road rather than a poisoned beer.
- Roger's role in the household is changed: Instead of being Sylvia's brother-in-law, he is the piano player at Castle Savage, and since the Caymans are deleted and there is no photograph for him to take from Carstairs' body, he is not present when the body is discovered.
- The motive for the murders is changed: Roger and Moira are revealed to be brother and sister, children of Sylvia from her first marriage, to Jack Savage's brother George. Jack and Sylvia began an affair while the brothers were living in China shortly before the beginning of World War II, and Jack had his brother, a vocal opponent of the Japanese, murdered. As the war intensified, Jack returned to England with Sylvia but forced her to leave her children behind, where Roger was placed in an orphanage and Moira, it is implied, was used as a "comfort girl" by the Japanese army. The denouement is changed; Moira and Roger are interrupted in an attempt to kill Sylvia by injecting her with poison, but are surprised by the other suspects. During the ensuing struggle, Tom shoots Roger, and Wilson kills Moira by injecting her with the poison she intended for Sylvia.

The Castle Savage scenes were largely filmed at Loseley Park near Guildford – a 16th-century stately home in Surrey belonging to the More-Molyneux family.

The cast for this adaptation included:

- Julia McKenzie as Miss Marple
- Sean Biggerstaff as Bobby Attfield
- David Buchanan as John Carstairs
- Siwan Morris as Florrie
- Helen Lederer as Marjorie Attfield
- Georgia Tennant as Frankie Derwent
- Samantha Bond as Sylvia Savage
- Richard Briers as Wilson
- Freddie Fox as Tom Savage
- Rik Mayall as Alec Nicholson
- Hannah Murray as Dorothy Savage
- Rafe Spall as Roger Bassington
- Natalie Dormer as Moira Nicholson
- Warren Clarke as Commander Peters
- Mark Williams as Claud Evans

=== 2013 ===
It was adapted as a 2013 episode of the French television series Les Petits Meurtres d'Agatha Christie.

=== 2022 ===
In April 2021, it was announced that Hugh Laurie would be adapting the novel for BritBox in 2022. The filming took place in Surrey, mainly in the villages of Shere and Albury, between June and August 2021, and at Three Cliffs Bay in Swansea. The three-part series became available on BritBox on 14 April 2022. It was then shown on ITVX and ITV in April 2023.
