= The Body in the Library =

1942 Miss Marple novel by Agatha Christie

- First edition (US)
- Author: Agatha Christie
- Language: English
- Series: Miss Marple novels
- Genre: Crime novel
- Publisher: Dodd, Mead and Company
- Publication date: February 1942
- Publication place: United States / United Kingdom
- Pages: 245 (first edition, hardcover)
- Preceded by: The Murder at the Vicarage
- Followed by: The Moving Finger

The Body in the Library is a mystery novel by Agatha Christie, first published in the US by Dodd, Mead and Company in February 1942 and in the UK by the Collins Crime Club in May of the same year. The US edition retailed at $2.00 and the UK edition at seven shillings and sixpence. The novel features her fictional amateur detective Miss Marple.

The plot concerns the murders of two teenage girls of outwardly similar appearance. One was an 18-year-old dancer, and the other was a 16-year-old Girl Guide with aspirations to an acting career. Jane Marple eventually uncovers the murderer. The story begins at St Mary Mead, the setting of the first Marple novel.

Contemporary reviewers liked the shrewd feminine viewpoint, though they missed Hercule Poirot. Christie stated that while writing her own variation on a classic theme, she wanted the library to be completely conventional, but the body to be highly improbable and sensational.

== Plot ==
The body of a young woman is found on the hearth rug in the library at Gossington Hall, home of Colonel Arthur and Dolly Bantry. The woman has heavy makeup, platinum-blonde hair, and wears a silver-spangled dress. Nobody knows who she is. The colonel contacts the police, and Dolly calls her friend Miss Jane Marple.

Colonel Melchett and Inspector Slack investigate. Hearing of a blond woman in the vicinity, Melchett visits the nearby cottage of Basil Blake, who works in the film industry. However, Blake's platinum-blonde girlfriend, Dinah Lee, is very much alive. An autopsy reveals that the young woman died between 10 pm and 12 midnight on the previous evening; she had been drugged and then strangled. Miss Marple thinks that the appearance of the girl is not quite right, noticing her bitten fingernails.

One of the elderly guests at the Majestic Hotel in Danemouth, the wealthy Conway Jefferson, has reported a missing person: Ruby Keene, an 18-year-old professional dancer. Jefferson tells police he planned to adopt Ruby, and has revised his will in her favour. She was last seen at around 11 pm dancing with another guest, George Bartlett, but she did not appear for her scheduled dance demonstration at midnight. Josie Turner, Ruby's cousin, also employed at the hotel, identifies the body as Ruby's.

Dolly and Miss Marple move to the Majestic to investigate. Jefferson calls in an old friend, Sir Henry Clithering, a former senior police officer. Sir Henry and Miss Marple agree to collaborate.

Some eight years earlier, Jefferson's wife, son, and daughter had all been killed in an aeroplane crash, and he now lives with his son-in-law, Mark, and daughter-in-law, Adelaide, who expect to inherit when the old man dies. The three were playing bridge that evening with Josie.

George Bartlett's burned-out car is found with a charred corpse inside. From one shoe and a button, the body is identified as that of 16-year-old Girl Guide Pamela Reeves who had been reported missing the previous night. On questioning Pamela's friends, Miss Marple learns that Pamela had been lured away by a 'film producer' with an offer of a screen test. Other clues point to Blake: his hearth rug is found dumped, and Jefferson's valet reports having seen a snapshot of Blake fall out of Ruby's handbag.

Blake confesses to Miss Marple that after returning home around midnight, rather drunk after a party, he had found the corpse on his hearth rug. Not liking Colonel Bantry very much, he had moved the body to Gossington Hall and left it there.

Miss Marple asks for a search at Somerset House, and a record is found of a marriage between Mark and Josie. At Miss Marple's suggestion, Jefferson tells Mark and Adelaide that he intends to change his will the next day, leaving his money to a hostel in London. At 3 am, an intruder enters Jefferson's bedroom, and Josie is caught in the act with a syringe filled with digitalin.

Miss Marple explains her thinking. The body in the library had been Pamela Reeves, made up to look like Ruby, with her bitten fingernails giving her away; Ruby was the charred body in the car. Thus, the time-related alibis at the hotel were useless. Miss Marple had never believed Josie's identification of the library corpse.

Upon learning that Jefferson planned to adopt Ruby, Mark and Josie had planned a double murder. Mark had lured Pamela to the hotel for a fictitious screen test; Josie dressed her, dyed her hair, made her up to resemble Ruby, then drugged her. During a break in the bridge game, Mark took the drugged Pamela to Blake's home, where he strangled her. Just before midnight, when Ruby went up to change for the exhibition dance, Josie followed and killed her. She then took Bartlett's car and drove Ruby, dressed in Pamela's clothes, to a quarry and destroyed the evidence by setting the car alight.

Adelaide agrees to marry her long-time suitor, Hugo, which pleases Jefferson. He makes a new will settling a cash sum on her, leaving the rest to her son Peter.

== Principal characters ==
- Miss Marple: resident of the village of Saint Mary Mead who has much experience in solving murders.
- Colonel Melchett: Chief Constable of Radfordshire.
- Dolly Bantry: a friend of her village neighbour Miss Marple.
- Colonel Arthur Bantry: retired soldier, husband of Dolly.
- Inspector Slack: investigating police officer.
- Dr Haydock: doctor who performs the post-mortem on the first body.
- Conway Jefferson: wealthy man guest at the Majestic Hotel. He is an old friend of the Bantrys.
- Mark Gaskell: Jefferson's daughter's widower. He is a smooth-talking and handsome man, and a gambler.
- Adelaide Jefferson: Jefferson's son's widow.
- Edwards: valet to Conway Jefferson.
- Ruby Keene: a professional dancer at the hotel; born Rosy Legge.
- Josie Turner: Ruby's cousin, also professional dancer.
- Raymond Starr: born Thomas Ramon Starr. He works as the tennis professional and dancer at the Majestic Hotel.
- Sir Henry Clithering: retired head of Scotland Yard and friend to Miss Marple.
- Superintendent Harper: from the police in Glenshire, where the hotel is located.
- Basil Blake: young man who recently moved into a cottage just outside St Mary Mead, and enjoys scorning the older generation. He works for a film studio.
- Dinah Lee: woman with platinum blonde hair who appears at Blake's home. They are married, but tell no-one in the village.
- George Bartlett: Ruby's last dance partner.
- Pamela Reeves: local girl, aged 16, a Girl Guide. The second victim.
- Florence Small: Pamela Reeves's friend.
- Hugo McLean: long-time friend of Adelaide who wants to marry her.

== Title ==
In her 'Author's Foreword', Christie describes "the body in the library" as a cliché of detective fiction. She states that when writing her own variation on this theme, she decided that the library should be a completely conventional one while the body would be a highly improbable and sensational one.

== Literary significance and reception ==
Maurice Willson Disher of The Times Literary Supplement was impressed in his review of 16 May 1942 with the female view of life injected into the solution of the crimes. "Some devoted souls may sigh for Hercule Poirot, but there are bound to be others who will be glad to find his place taken by Miss Marple in the 'new Agatha Christie'. What this relief signifies is that professional detectives are no match for elderly spinsters (not all so elderly), with some training in looking under the antimacassar, who are now very much in fashion. Even while making full allowance for this, we find it hard not to be impressed by old-maid logic. When Miss Marple says, 'The dress was all wrong,' she is plainly observing facts hidden from the masculine eye – facts which are of a very lively interest. The Body in the Library should turn Hendon College co-educational."

Maurice Richardson was not as impressed with Christie's efforts in his 17 May 1942 review in The Observer when he concluded: "Ingenious, of course, but interest is rather diffuse and the red herrings have lost their phosphorescence."

An unnamed reviewer in the Toronto Daily Star (21 March 1942) wrote that "It doesn't take long to read this one, but the two killings in it are made so mysterious that you will not want to lay the book down until the killer is caught." The reviewer concludes, "Police do a lot of probing, but it is the shrewd reasoning – intuition perhaps – of Jane Marple that finds the missing link and discloses a diabolical plot."

Writing in 1990, Robert Barnard was positive, considering the plot to be classic rather than clichéd: a "bravura performance on a classic situation". The shift of locations, from Miss Marple's village to a seaside resort hotel, he felt were good for the story: "St Mary Mead regulars figure in the case, pleasantly diversified by fashionable seaside hotel guests and the film crowd." Addressing the likelihood of the novel's events, he said that "If you think what happens to the body after death is unlikely, try the more 'realistic' P. D. James' An Unsuitable Job for a Woman, published 30 years later."

== Adaptations ==
The 1984 television film The Body in the Library was part of the BBC series of Miss Marple, with Joan Hickson making the first of her appearances in the role of Jane Marple. The adaptation was transmitted in three parts between 26 and 28 December 1984.

A second adaptation of the novel was made in 2004 by ITV, as part of its Agatha Christie's Marple series. This adaptation starred Geraldine McEwan as Miss Marple, James Fox as Colonel Bantry, Joanna Lumley as Dolly Bantry, Ian Richardson as Conway Jefferson, and Jamie Theakston as Mark Gaskell.

A third adaptation appeared as the ninth episode of French television series Les Petits Meurtres d'Agatha Christie. It first aired in 2011.

A fourth adaptation aired as part of the 2018 Korean television series, Ms. Ma, Nemesis.

=== Radio ===
A radio adaptation was produced for BBC Radio 4 on 22nd May 1999. The production was dramatised by Michael Bakewell and directed by Enyd Williams. The cast list featured June Whitfield as Miss Marple, Richard Todd as Colonel Melchett, Pauline Jameson as Dolly Bantry, Jack Watling as Colonel Bantry, Graham Crowden as Sir Henry Clithering, and Ben Crowe as George Bartlett.

== Publication history ==
UK first edition (1942)

The novel was first serialised in the US in The Saturday Evening Post in seven parts from 10 May (Volume 213, Number 45) to 21 June 1941 (Volume 213, Number 51) with illustrations by Hy Rubin.
