= Endless Night (novel) =

1967 mystery novel by Agatha Christie

- Dust-jacket illustration of the first UK edition
- Author: Agatha Christie
- Cover artist: Kenneth Farnhill
- Language: English
- Genre: Crime novel
- Publisher: Collins Crime Club
- Publication date: 30 October 1967
- Publication place: United Kingdom
- Media type: Print (hardback & paperback)
- Pages: 224 pp (first edition, hardcover)
- Preceded by: Third Girl
- Followed by: By the Pricking of My Thumbs

Endless Night is a mystery novel by Agatha Christie, first published in the UK by the Collins Crime Club on 30 October 1967 and in the US by Dodd, Mead and Company the following year. It was one of her favourites of her own works and received some of the warmest critical notices of her career upon publication.

== Etymology ==
The title comes from William Blake's Auguries of Innocence:

Every night and every morn,
Some to misery are born,
Every morn and every night,
Some are born to sweet delight.
Some are born to sweet delight,
Some are born to endless night.

== Plot summary ==
The story begins with Michael Rogers, a twenty-two year old, telling the reader about his time as a chauffeur and how he met the architect Rudolf Santonix. He plans to one day have a house built by Santonix. Mike is poor though, and so cannot afford to hire Santonix to build the house he wants. Michael explains that he is a “rolling stone”; he is not content doing just one thing and so has held down many different jobs over the years. One day he wants to settle down in his dream house with his dream woman, but for now he cannot imagine settling down.

Mike is walking along a village road near the Gipsy's Acre property one day when he falls in love with the grounds. He fantasises about one day building a house there with the woman he loves. Curious to see what an auction is like, he goes to the auction for the property. Several people are interested in buying it, but the bid does not go high enough and no one ends up getting the property rights. Michael suspects that this is because of the supposed gipsy's curse over the property.

While walking through the grounds, he meets Fenella (Ellie) Guteman by chance, a wealthy heiress who wants to escape from her world of snobby friends, begging relatives, and restrictive financial advisors. She introduces herself as Fenella "Goodman," not wanting him to know her true identity as an heiress. They get along quite well and it seems like love at first sight. He shares his dream of owning the acre with her and she seems to reciprocate and encourage the idea. Ellie also mentions her lovely hired companion, Greta Andersen. Apparently, Greta has acted like a best friend to her for several years now and is described as very efficient. Mike appears incredibly jealous of their close relationship, despite never actually having met Greta before.

Mike then sees Ellie on and off over the next few weeks before she has to travel abroad for her twenty-first birthday. While away from Ellie, Michael discovers that the property he wants has finally been bought. He also returns to his mother's house to ask her for money to marry Ellie. It is quite clear that he does not like his mother and she does not like him. The situation reads as though she simply disapproves of his spontaneous lifestyle, but Michael claims that his mother knows him all too well. He leaves without the money.

When Ellie returns, she reveals to Mike that she is in fact, one of the wealthiest women in America and that she was the person who bought Gipsy's Acre. She wants to marry him and help fulfil his dream of building a beautiful house there. She does not mind leaving her home and family in America to move to England for him. They get married in a simple civil ceremony, without her family's knowledge. Michael is poor and Ellie fears that her family would not approve of him. When they find out, they are indeed highly disapproving of Mike. They fire Greta for helping arrange the marriage in secret. Regardless, Ellie refuses to leave Michael.

Once married, they hire Santonix to build a mansion for them on the acre.

On the night Ellie and Mike move in, a rock is thrown through their window, telling them to leave the acre. Ellie is shaken by the incident, but not enough to want to move. Ellie entertains the idea of inviting Greta to live with them at the acre, feeling bad for getting her fired, but Michael does not like the idea.

Mike and Ellie discover a folly near the cliffs on their property, which they restore and use as a secret getaway.

The newlywed couple spend the next few weeks meeting the villagers. Major Phillpot, the local landowner, although not a wealthy man, is seen as the "God" of the village; he becomes close with Michael. Another villager, Claudia Hardcastle, rides horses and befriends Ellie. They start riding horses together regularly. Ellie reveals that although she is allergic to horses, she takes pills to calm her allergies before riding. She offers them to Claudia, who is also mildly allergic. Later, it is revealed that Claudia is Santonix's half-sister and was once married to one of Ellie's lawyers, Stanford Lloyd.

Meanwhile, an old gipsy woman, Mrs. Lee, continues to warn Mike and Ellie of a curse and instructs them to leave the house they built. Ellie grows increasingly wary of her, so much so that Michael goes to the police station to report Mrs. Lee. He learns that in the past, Mrs. Lee had been bribed with money to terrify other residents. Mike wonders if someone is doing that again.

In the meantime, much to Ellie's chagrin, her American family refuses to leave her alone. Her stepmother, Cora, has moved to the UK to be close to her. Ellie's lawyers also keep in constant contact with her. Her head lawyer, Mr. Lippincott (known to Ellie as 'Uncle Andrew') is especially concerned over her marriage to Michael.

When Ellie injures her ankle she needs someone to help take care of her; she persuades Michael to let Greta stay with them. Ellie worries about Michael and Greta, as they do no appear to like each other and even get into a very heated argument one night.

Michael's mother comes to visit them at Gipsy's Acre when he is not there; she meets with Ellie and has a short conversation with her. Ellie tells Michael this later and he becomes enraged that his mother came to visit, unbeknownst to him. Ellie is puzzled by his anger.

One day, Ellie goes out horse riding in the morning. She goes alone because Claudia is shopping in London with Greta that day. Before she leaves, Mike suggests that Ellie join him and Major Phillpot at lunch later, which she agrees to. Mike attends an auction with Major Phillpot; since he married Ellie, he can now afford whatever he wants, so he outbids several others to buy a gift for Ellie. After the auction, he thinks he sees Claudia and one of Ellie's lawyers driving away in a car. He thinks it odd, since Claudia was supposed to be shopping at the outlets and the lawyer was supposed to be in America.

While at lunch with Major Phillpot, Mike begins to worry that Ellie has not yet joined them. She never turns up to lunch and when Mike calls Gipsy's Acre, he learns that she has not yet returned from her morning ride. Mike and Phillpot search the forest around the house; eventually, Mike discovers Ellie's dead body, having sustained no apparent injuries. The local police determine that Ellie died of shock when she was thrown from her horse. Several witnesses come forward, claiming that they saw a woman in the woods at the same time Ellie was riding her horse. The police believe it was Mrs. Lee who scared the horse on purpose and killed Ellie by accident, not knowing she had a heart condition.

At the inquest, it is revealed that a gold lighter was found in the nearby folly with the initial 'C' on it. It could either belong to Claudia Hardcastle, Ellie's riding companion, or Cora, her stepmother. The inquest is inconclusive, because Mrs. Lee does not show up in court.

After the inquest, Michael travels to America to attend Ellie's funeral with her family and collect his inheritance. While there, he hears that Mrs. Lee has been found dead in a quarry, and Claudia Hardcastle has also died while out riding her horse. He wonders if it can be a coincidence.

From Mr. Lippincott, he also officially learns that Claudia used to be married to Stanford Lloyd, another one of Ellie's lawyers (the one he thought he saw her with that day). Mr. Lippincott asks Mike if he ever knew Greta before meeting Ellie, which he denies. Mr. Lippincott mentions that he has written and sent a letter to Michael – he will get it upon his arrival back in England.

Before returning to England, Mike goes to visit Santonix on his deathbed in California, his failing health having worsened over the course of the novel. Before Santonix dies, he screams, “You should have gone the other way!” Feeling disturbed by this, Mike returns to the UK on a sea voyage, giving him time to reflect.

When he finally returns to his dream home, he opens the door to join his dream woman: Greta Andersen. He reveals how he and Greta had met in Hamburg years ago. They had fallen in love and later, after Mike had heard that Gipsy's Acre was for sale, they devised a plan to get Ellie's money. Greta first became Ellie's maid and gained her trust. Greta then arranged that Ellie would meet Michael on the day of the auction. Mike and Greta pretended not to know each other and even hate each other so no one would suspect them. They plan to get married and share Ellie's wealth now that she is dead.

They killed Ellie with cyanide, putting it inside her allergy capsules that she took prior to her horse ride. It was Mike who paid Mrs. Lee to frighten Ellie with the story of the curse. To eliminate Mrs. Lee as a witness, Michael and Greta pushed her into a quarry. Claudia Hardcastle was unintentionally poisoned after finding and taking one of Ellie's pills in the folly. It was her lighter that was left behind by accident.

Michael and Greta celebrate what they have done, but when Michael opens the letter from Mr. Lippincott, he is horrified to find an old newspaper clipping with a picture of himself with Greta in Hamburg. He worries that people will suspect the truth and becomes agitated. He hallucinates that he sees Ellie on the grounds before entering the house. Greta tries to reassure him, but, in a fit of rage, he strangles her.

Shortly afterwards, the police and the local doctor arrive, their suspicions aroused by Claudia Hardcastle's death. They find him sitting with Greta's corpse, slowly losing his sanity.

It is revealed that after Mike was arrested, he wanted to write down the entire story from his perspective; the entire novel is that account.

He recounts that as a child, he let his friend drown in a frozen pond to steal his watch. As a young adult, he let another friend bleed to death after he was stabbed during a mugging, just so Mike could steal the money on his person. He always hated his mother because she was the only person who could see through him and suspected the truth about his murderous tendencies, hence his anger when Ellie met his mother: he was worried his mother might reveal his true character to her.

Michael thinks Santonix might have known or suspected his true character as well. When Santonix told him he "should've gone the other way," he meant that Mike should not have murdered Ellie and instead learned to love her.

He wonders if he could have ever actually been happy with Ellie and why he threw his chance with her away. He wonders if he ever did love her. The novel ends.

== Characters ==
- Michael Rogers: a 'rolling stone', who shifts from job to job.
- Fenella Rogers (née Guteman): often called Ellie, she is a sweet heiress with a head for business.
- Greta Andersen: Ellie's Scandinavian, blonde companion who manages and organises her life.
- Claudia Hardcastle: a young woman in the village who shares Ellie's passion for horse-riding.
- Cora Van Stuyvesant: Ellie's stepmother.
- Andrew Lippincott: Ellie's guardian and trustee, a Bostonian, who disapproves of Greta's influence over Ellie.
- Esther Lee: the village gypsy, who enjoys frightening people, especially when money is involved.
- Stanford Lloyd: Claudia Hardcastle's former husband and one of Ellie's trustees.
- Frank Barton: the husband of Ellie's aunt, a man who borrows but does not return.
- Rudolf Santonix: a perfectionist architect who 'looks through you' and 'sees right through the other side'.
- Major Phillpot: the village 'god' who befriends Michael.
- Mrs. Rogers: Michael's mother.

== Literary significance and reception ==
The novel was published in 1967. Christie later said she normally wrote her books in three to four months but wrote Endless Night in six weeks. The novel is dedicated "To Nora Prichard from whom I first heard the legend of Gipsy's Acre." Nora Prichard was the paternal grandmother of Mathew, Christie's only grandson. Gipsy's Acre was a field located on a Welsh moorland. The Times Literary Supplement of 16 November 1967 said, "It really is bold of Agatha Christie to write in the persona of a working-class boy who marries a poor little rich girl, but in a pleasantly gothic story of gypsy warnings she brings it all off, together with a nicely melodramatic final twist."

The Guardian carried a laudatory review in its issue of 10 November 1967 by Francis Iles (Anthony Berkeley Cox) who said, "The old maestrina of the crime-novel (or whatever is the female of 'maestro') pulls yet another out of her inexhaustible bag with Endless Night, quite different in tone from her usual work. It is impossible to say much about the story without giving away vital secrets: sufficient to warn the reader that if he should think this is a romance he couldn't be more mistaken, and the crashing, not to say horrific suspense at the end is perhaps the most devastating that this surpriseful author has ever brought off."

Maurice Richardson in The Observer of 5 November 1967 began, "She changes her style again and makes a determined and quite suspenseful attempt to be with it." He finished, "I shan't give away who murders whom, but the suspense is kept up all the way and Miss Christie's new demi-tough, streamlined style really does come off. She'll be wearing black leather pants next, if she isn't already." The poet and novelist Stevie Smith chose the novel as one of her Books of the Year in the same newspaper's issue of 10 December 1967 when she said, "I mostly read Agatha Christie this year (and every year). I wish I could write more about what she does for one in the way of lifting the weight, and so on."

Robert Barnard: "The best of the late Christies, the plot a combination of patterns used in Ackroyd and Nile (note similarities in treatment of heiress/heroine's American lawyers in Nile and here, suggesting she had been rereading). The murder occurs very late, and thus the central section seems desultory, even novelettish (poor little rich girl, gypsy's curse, etc.). But all is justified by the conclusion. A splendid late flowering." Read also: Pierre Bayard: Qui a tué Roger Ackroyd? Chapter 2: le paradoxe du Menteur. Les Editions de Minuit 1998.

== Adaptations ==
=== "The Case of the Caretaker" ===
A short story collection by Agatha Christie, titled Miss Marple's Final Cases and Two Other Stories, published in October 1979, features a short story called "The Case of the Caretaker" whose overall plot is the same as Endless Night, although the character names are different.

"‘The Case of the Caretaker’ was first published in the Strand Magazine, January 1942, and then in the USA in the Chicago Sunday Tribune, 5 July 1942." from "Miss Marple – Miss Marple and Mystery: The Complete Short Stories (Miss Marple)" by Agatha Christie

=== Endless Night (1972 film) ===
In 1972, Sidney Gilliat directed a film adaption starring Hayley Mills, Britt Ekland, Per Oscarsson, Hywel Bennett and George Sanders (who died by suicide before the film's release). The film received mixed reviews, and following an unsuccessful run in the United Kingdom, was not released theatrically in the United States.

Christie was initially pleased by Gilliat's involvement and the casting. However, she was disappointed in the finished product, calling it "lacklustre". She also voiced her reservations about the film featuring a brief nude scene with Ekland at the end.

=== Saturday Theatre (BBC Radio 4) ===
Endless Night was presented as a one-hour radio play in the Saturday Theatre strand on BBC Radio 4 on 30 August 2008 at 2:30 pm. The play's recording took place at Broadcasting House and had an original score composed by Nicolai Abrahamsen.

Adaptor: Joy Wilkinson
Producer/Director: Sam Hoyle
Cast:
Jonathan Forbes as Mike
Lizzy Watts as Ellie
Sara Stewart as Greta
Joan Walker as Cora/Mike's Mother
Victoria Lennox as Mrs. Lee
Chris Pavlo as Mr. Constantine/Auctioneer/Policeman/Assistant
John Rowe as Philpott/Lippincott
Joseph Tremain as Young Mike/Army Boy
Dan Starkey as Santonix/Frank
Thomas Brown-Lowe as Oscar

=== Graphic novel adaptation ===
Endless Night was released by HarperCollins as a graphic novel adaptation on 3 November 2008, adapted by François Rivière and illustrated by Frank Leclercq (ISBN 0-00-727533-1).

=== Agatha Christie's Marple adaptation ===
Although the book did not feature Miss Marple, the novel was an extension of a Miss Marple story called "The Case of the Caretaker". It was filmed as part of the sixth series of Agatha Christie's Marple, starring Julia McKenzie. It aired first on Argentina's Film&Arts on Wednesday 20 November 2013, Australia's ABC on Sunday 22 December 2013, and aired on ITV on Sunday 29 December 2013. This adaptation by Kevin Elyot remains fairly faithful to the book, although with the exception of adding Miss Marple.

=== French adaptation ===
A French adaptation as part of the television series Les Petits Meurtres d'Agatha Christie was planned for 2021.

=== Television adaptation ===
In May 2025 a television series was greenlit by BBC and BritBox International. Sarah Phelps will adapt for Mammoth Screen while Fifth Season has worldwide rights. Filming will occur later on in the year.

=== New film version ===
In December 2025 it was announced that a new film adaptation would be made for Studiocanal. It is set to be adapted by Emily Siegel, and directed by Jonathan Entwistle.

== Publication history ==
The UK edition retailed at eighteen shillings (18/-) and the US edition at $4.95.

- 1967, Collins Crime Club (London), 30 October 1967, Hardcover, 224 pp
- 1968, Dodd Mead and Company (New York), 1968, Hardcover, 248 pp
- 1969, Pocket Books (New York), Paperback, 181 pp
- 1970, Fontana Books (Imprint of HarperCollins), Paperback, 192 pp
- 1972, Ulverscroft Large-print Edition, Hardcover, 342 pp, ISBN 0-85456-115-3
- 2011, HarperCollins; Facsimile edition, Hardcover: 224 pages, ISBN 978-0-00-739570-5

In the US, the novel was first serialised in two parts in The Saturday Evening Post from 24 February (Volume 241, Number 4) to 9 March 1968 (Volume 241, Number 5) with illustrations by Tom Adams.
