= St Mary Mead =

Fictional English village

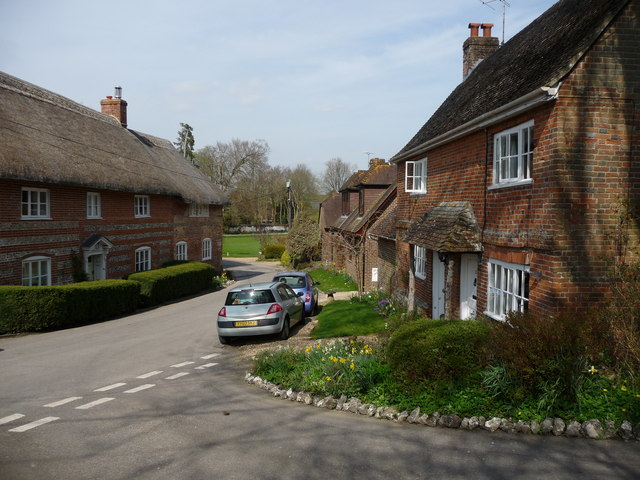
Nether Wallop, Hampshire, UK, features as the fictional St Mary Mead in the television series Miss Marple (1984–1992). The house on the left served as the title character's home.

St Mary Mead is a fictional village created by popular crime fiction author Dame Agatha Christie.

The quaint, sleepy village was home to the renowned detective spinster Miss Marple. However, Christie first described a village of that name prior to Marple's introduction, in the 1928 Hercule Poirot novel The Mystery of the Blue Train. In that novel, St Mary Mead is home to the book's protagonist Katherine Grey. It is not the same village as Miss Marple's home, being in a different county. The village was first mentioned in a Miss Marple book in 1930, when it was the setting for the first Marple novel, The Murder at the Vicarage.

== Location ==
Miss Marple's St Mary Mead is described in The Murder at the Vicarage as being in the fictional county of Downshire, but in the later novel The Body in the Library Downshire has become Radfordshire. In the BBC Miss Marple TV adaptation of Nemesis, a letter from Mr Rafiel's solicitors indicate that St Mary Mead is located in the (also fictional) county of Middleshire. The St Mary Mead of Katherine Grey is in Kent.

Miss Marple lives in Danemead Cottage, the last cottage in Old Pasture Lane. Her telephone number is "three five" on a manual exchange.

Miss Marple's phone number changes over the course of the TV series. In The Body in the Library (1984) her number is St Mary Mead 35, while in "4:50 from Paddington" (1987) her number is St Mary Mead 236.

Once it has been fully established as Miss Marple's home village, St Mary Mead is supposed to be in South East England, 25 miles (40 kilometres) from London and 25 miles from Alton. It is just outside the town of Much Benham and is close to Market Basing (which appears as a name of a town in many of Agatha Christie's novels and short stories), 12 miles (19 kilometres) from the fashionable seaside resort of Danemouth, and also 12 miles (19 kilometres) from the coastal town of Loomouth. Using the distances from Alton and London gives a narrow possible location of a Vesica Piscis bounded by Winkfield, Bagshot, Peaslake, East Horsley, Byfleet and Windsor Great Park. This is inconsistent though with the references to the proximity of the coast as the coast is at least 25 miles from this area. Other towns said to be close by include Brackhampton, Medenham Wells, and Milchester. The neighbourhood of St Mary Mead is served by trains arriving at Paddington railway station, indicating a location west or south-west of London. It has been suggested that Market Basing is Basingstoke and Danemouth is Bournemouth. In the BBC Miss Marple television adaptations the Hampshire village of Nether Wallop was used as the setting for St Mary Mead. Brackhampton could be Bracknell, although this is 26 miles north of Basingstoke.

== Description ==
Before the Second World War, the village was not particularly large. The only road of significance passing through it was the High Street. Here were the well-established establishments of Mr Petherick, the solicitor; Mrs Jamieson, the hairdresser; Mr Thomas's basket-weavers; the 'Blue Boar' pub; Mr Footit the butcher, Mr Jim Armstrong's dairy, Mr Berks the baker, and Mr Baker's grocery shop. The lightly trafficked railway station, featured in the book Murder at the Vicarage, is also to be found at the very end of the High Street; although the station may have closed by the period of the novel 4:50 from Paddington, as Mrs McGillicuddy has a taxi arranged for the 9 miles (14 kilometres) from Milchester station to Miss Marple's house.

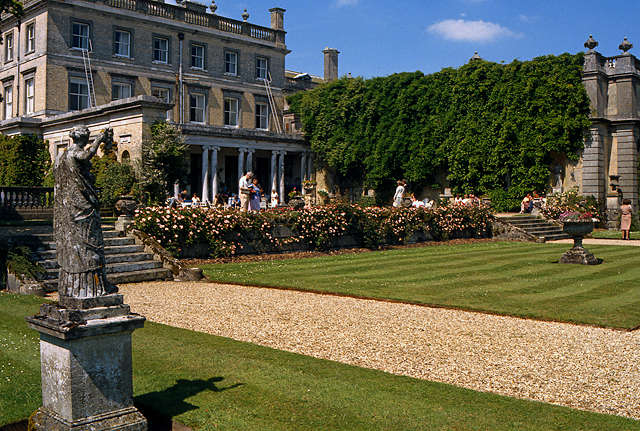
The estate of Somerley, in Ellingham, Harbridge and Ibsley, UK, served as a St Mary Mead location (Gossington Hall) in the 1992 finale episode of the series Miss Marple

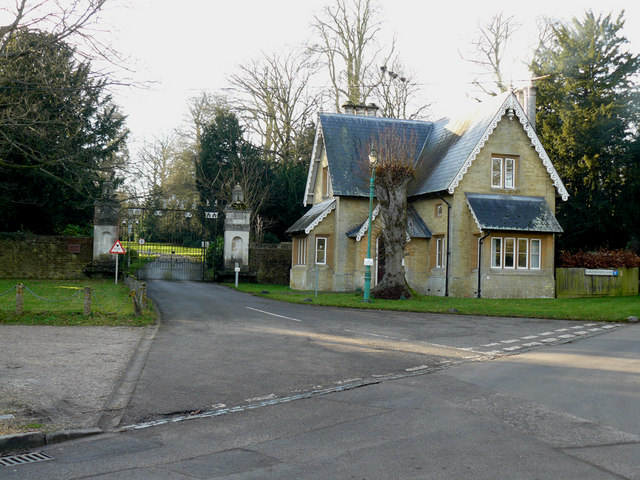
The gatehouse of Amport House, in Amport, UK, served as a St Mary Mead building (the East Lodge) in the 1992 finale episode of the series Miss Marple

Then, slightly further up Lansham Road, was the Victorian structure of Gossington Hall. Until the 1950s this was lived in by a retired soldier, Colonel Arthur Bantry, and his wife Mrs Dolly Bantry, Miss Marple's best friends in the village. However, after Colonel Bantry died, Mrs Bantry sold the estate, but continued to live in the grounds, in the East Lodge. After one or two changes of ownership, the Hall was later bought by the film star Marina Gregg. One mile down Lansham Road was a very modern cottage called Chatsworth, also known as the "Period Piece" and "Mr Booker's new house". It was bought in the early 1930s by Basil Blake, a member of the art department at Lemville film studios. It was also inhabited by Basil's wife, Dinah Lee, an actress.

At the other end of Lansham Road, a small lane called Old Pasture Lane broke away from the main street. Nestled in this lane were three Queen Anne or Georgian houses, which belonged to three spinsters. The first house belonged to the long-nosed, gushing and excitable Miss Caroline Wetherby. The second house was that of Miss Amanda Hartnell, a proud, decent woman with a deep voice. The last cottage was called Danemead Cottage and belonged to Miss Jane Marple, the famous spinster who solved countless cases between 1930 and 1976. The Post Office, and the dressmaker's shop belonging to Mrs Politt, were located in front of the lane.

At the centre of the village was the Vicarage, a very grand Victorian structure at the end of Old Pasture Lane. This was home to the Vicar, Leonard Clement, his young wife, Griselda, with their nephew, Dennis, and later with their two sons, Leonard and David.

Near the gardens of the Vicarage was a back lane which led to a small cottage called Little Gates. Until 1930, it was inhabited by an Anglo-Indian colonel who moved away and briefly rented it out to Mrs Lestrange.

Beyond the Vicarage were two more houses. The first was the residence of the village GP, Doctor Gerard Haydock. He continued to live on in the village beyond 1960. The other cottage was much larger than Dr Haydock's and belonged to Mrs Martha Price-Ridley, a rich and dictatorial widow, and the most vicious gossip of all the old ladies in the village. There was also a large estate, Old Hall, belonging to the despised local magistrate, Colonel Lucius Protheroe. He was murdered in 1930 in Mr Clement's study in the Vicarage. After his death, the house was turned into a block of flats, to the great disapproval of the villagers. The flats housed Mrs Carmichael, a rich and eccentric old lady who was bullied by her maid, the Larkins, two sisters by the name of Skinner, one of whom was a supposed hypochondriac, and a young married couple. A robbery was later committed by the Skinner sisters.

Finally, just beyond the home of Mrs Price-Ridley was a small stream, leading to the fields of Farmer Giles. However, the Second World War took its toll on the village, and soon after the war Farmer Giles's fields were bought and a new housing estate was built. This was referred to as 'The Development' by the villagers who survived the war.
