= National Theatre of Brent =

The National Theatre of Brent is a British comedy double act, in the form of a mock two-man theatre troupe. Patrick Barlow plays Desmond Olivier Dingle, the troupe's founder, artistic director and chief executive. The role of his assistant (or as Desmond likes to call him, "my entire company") was first performed by Julian Hough. It has subsequently been taken by various actors, including Jim Broadbent (as Wallace), Robert Austin (as Bernard), and John Ramm (as Raymond Box).

Their 1998 production Love Upon the Throne (featuring Barlow as Prince Charles and Ramm as Diana, Princess of Wales) was nominated for a Laurence Olivier Theatre Award for Best Comedy. Barlow has written a number of books under the banner of The National Theatre of Brent, two of which, Shakespeare: The Truth! and All the World's a Globe: From Lemur to Cosmonaut, have been adapted for radio. Their radio production in 2007 was The Arts and How They Was Done, for BBC Radio 4, starring Barlow and Ramm, with Harriet Walter as guest star.

In September 2011 the National Theatre of Brent produced Giant Ladies That Changed the World, the story of the suffragettes, as five 15-minute episodes broadcast as the 15 Minute Drama following Woman's Hour on Radio 4.

== Productions ==
'The Pioneering Days':

- 1980 - The Charge of the Light Brigade
- 1981 - Zulu!!
- 1982 - The Black Hole of Calcutta
- 1982 - Wagner's Ring Cycle
- 1983 - The Messiah
- 1983 - The Messiah (on television)
- 1984 - The Complete Guide to Sex
- 1985 - Mighty Moments from World History (on television)
- 1987 - Greatest Story Ever Told
- 1989 - Revolution!! (on television)
- 1990 - All the World's a Globe (BBC Radio 3 & 4)

'The Days of Glory':

- 1993 - The Complete Life and Works of Shakespeare
- 1995 - Oh Dear Purcell!
- 1996 - Greatest Story Ever Told (On Radio)
- 1997 - The Mysteries of Sex
- 1997 - The Brent Shakespeare Masterclass
- 1998 - Love Upon the Throne
- 1999 - Massive Landmarks of the Twentieth Century

'The New Millennium':

- 2000–1 - The Messiah
- 2001–2 - The Wonder of Sex
- 2004 - The Complete and Utter History of the Mona Lisa - BBC Radio 4
- 2006 - The Messiah - BBC Radio 4
- 2007 - The Arts and How They Was Done - BBC Radio 4
- 2009 - Joan of Arc, and How She Became a Saint - BBC Radio 4
- 2009 - The National Theatre of Brent's Iconic Icons - BBC Radio 4
- 2011 - Giant Ladies That Changed The World - BBC Radio 4
- 2018 - The National Theatre of Brent's Illustrated Guide to Sex and How It Was Done - BBC Radio 4
- 2019 - The First Man on the Moon and How They Done It - BBC Radio 4
