= Patrick Barlow =

English actor, comedian and playwright

- Born: Evan George Patrick Barlow; 18 March 1947 (age 79); Leicester, England
- Occupations: Actor, playwright, comedian
- Years active: 1968–present

Evan George Patrick Barlow (born 18 March 1947) is an English actor, comedian and playwright. His comedic alter ego, Desmond Olivier Dingle, is the founder, artistic director and chief executive of the two-man National Theatre of Brent, which has performed on stage, on television and on radio. Barlow was born in Leicester.

== Career ==
=== Radio ===
Barlow is the scriptwriter, as well as lead performer, in many National Theatre of Brent productions, in particular All the World's a Globe (1987), Desmond Olivier Dingle's Compleat Life and Works of William Shakespeare (1995) and The Arts and How They Was Done (2007). In non-Theatre of Brent performances, he wrote and played in the four-part situation comedy for radio called The Patrick and Maureen Maybe Music Experience which ran for four weeks from January 1999.

He played the part of Om in the radio adaptation of Terry Pratchett's Small Gods (2006), which was adapted by Robin Brooks.

=== Television ===
In Is It Legal? (1995–1998), Barlow played Bob whose character is besotted with his co-star Imelda Staunton; he played the part of the vicar in Jam & Jerusalem. He has also written and directed his National Theatre of Brent material for television, and played the part of Max in series 2 and the 2004 special of Absolutely Fabulous.

Barlow appeared in Victoria Wood As Seen on TV as well as French & Saunders.

He had a brief but scene-stealing cameo as Maurice Morrison, the wedding caterer/planner for Cully Barnaby's nuptials in Midsomer Murders episode 61 (series 11, ep 2) "Blood Wedding", first shown 2008.

In "Uptown Downstairs Abbey" for Comic Relief 2011 Barlow played the part of Carter, spoofing Jim Carter's character Carson in Downton Abbey.

=== Stage ===
Barlow wrote a stage adaptation of John Buchan's novel The 39 Steps and Alfred Hitchcock's film of the same name, based on the novel, which premiered in June 2005 at the West Yorkshire Playhouse. After revision, the play opened at London's Tricycle Theatre in August 2006, and after a successful run transferred to the Criterion Theatre in Piccadilly in September 2006. The play has also been performed on Broadway since early 2008, in Australia by the Melbourne Theatre Company in April 2008. and in Wellington, New Zealand, by Circa Theatre in July/August 2009 and in Bancroft, Ontario by Blackfly Theatre in July 2011. This play was performed in Ottawa, Ontario, by Seven Thirty Productions 7–24 September 2011, and in Halifax, Nova Scotia, by the Neptune Theatre in January–February 2015.

== Selected filmography ==
Barlow wrote the script for The Young Visiters [sic] and had a cameo as the priest. His one-time Theatre of Brent partner Jim Broadbent co-starred with Hugh Laurie.

Most of his film work has been in cameo roles, for example:

- Shakespeare in Love (1998) as Will Kempe
- Notting Hill (1999) as the Savoy Concierge
- Bridget Jones's Diary (2001) as Julian
- Girl From Rio (2001) as Mr. Strothers
- Nanny McPhee (2005) as Mr. Jowls
- The Riot Club (2014) as Don
