= The Murder at the Vicarage =

1930 mystery novel by Agatha Christie

- First edition (UK)
- Author: Agatha Christie
- Language: English
- Series: Miss Marple novels
- Genre: Crime novel
- Publisher: Collins Crime Club
- Publication date: 20 October 1930
- Publication place: United Kingdom
- Pages: 256 (first edition, hardcover)
- Followed by: The Body in the Library
- Text: The Murder at the Vicarage at Wikisource

The Murder at the Vicarage is a mystery novel by the British writer Agatha Christie, first published in the UK by the Collins Crime Club on 20 October 1930 and in the US by Dodd, Mead and Company later in the same year. The UK edition retailed at seven shillings and sixpence and the US edition at $2.00.

It is the first novel to feature the character of Miss Marple and her village of St Mary Mead. The character had previously appeared in short stories published in magazines, from December 1927. These earlier stories were collected in book form in The Thirteen Problems in 1932. In 2025, BBC included the novel in its list of '10 of the most ingenious murder mysteries ever committed to page or screen'.

== Plot ==
The Reverend Leonard Clement, vicar of St Mary Mead, narrates the story. He lives with his much younger wife, Griselda, and his nephew, Dennis. Colonel Lucius Protheroe, Clement's churchwarden, is a wealthy, abrasive man who is widely disliked.

Clement encounters Protheroe's young wife, Anne, embracing Lawrence Redding, a visiting artist. While promising that he will not reveal their affair, he advises Redding to leave the village at once. The next day Clement is scheduled to meet Protheroe to go over irregularities in the church accounts. Clement is called away to visit a dying parishioner, but learns on arrival that nobody had asked for him. Upon returning home, Clement encounters a distressed Redding at the vicarage gate, then discovers Colonel Protheroe dead at his writing desk with a gunshot wound to the head. He summons Dr Haydock.

The police, led by Colonel Melchett and Inspector Slack, are confounded by several details, including a note left by Protheroe that conflicts with Haydock's opinion of the time of death, and the claim of some witnesses to have heard a shot in the woods. Both Lawrence Redding and Anne Protheroe confess to the murder. However both are exonerated – Redding because he insists on an inaccurate time of death and Anne because Miss Marple had clearly seen she was not carrying a pistol. Other suspects include Archer, a man treated harshly by Protheroe for poaching; Mrs Lestrange, a mysterious woman who has appeared in the village recently; Dr Stone, an archaeologist excavating a barrow on Protheroe's land; and Stone's assistant, Miss Cram.

Miss Marple sees Miss Cram carrying a suitcase into the woods at midnight; Clement later finds it, along with a crystal of picric acid. The suitcase contains valuable silver belonging to the Protheroes; Dr Stone turns out to be an impostor who has replaced the Protheroes' belongings with replicas.

Mrs Price-Ridley receives a threatening phone call. Anne Protheroe discovers a portrait slashed to pieces with a knife. A police handwriting expert examines the victim's note and determines that Protheroe did not write it. After Clement is inspired to give a far more vigorous sermon than usual, he receives a call from Hawes, his sickly curate, who says he has something to confess. Clement arrives at Hawes' rooms to find that he has taken an overdose. He discovers the real note Protheroe was writing when he was killed, which reveals that Hawes was responsible for stealing money from the church.

Miss Marple explains that the killers are Lawrence Redding and Anne Protheroe. In love with Anne, Redding decided they could be together only if he eliminated her husband. On the pretext of seeking advice from Clement, he left his pistol in a potted-plant holder at the vicarage. He then planted the picric acid in the woods nearby, rigging it to explode and create a second gunshot sound that would confuse witnesses. In the evening Redding made the false call to Clement to get him out of the house, while Anne walked past Miss Marple's home without a handbag and in a close-fitting dress to show she was not carrying a gun. She retrieved the pistol, killed her husband, and left the vicarage. Redding entered, stole the note that incriminated Hawes, and planted his own note falsifying the time of death.

Both conspirators had confessed to the crime, but with obvious falsehoods in their stories, each appearing to exonerate the other. Redding drugged Hawes and planted Protheroe's note to make it look as though Hawes had tried to kill himself. Dr Haydock saves Hawes' life. Miss Marple proposes a trap that tricks Redding into incriminating himself; he and Anne are arrested.

The ending ties up the loose ends. Lettice reveals that Mrs Lestrange is her mother, Colonel Protheroe's first wife, who is terminally ill; Lettice destroyed the portrait of the first Mrs Protheroe so that the police would not recognise and suspect Mrs Lestrange. Lettice and her mother depart to spend the latter's last days travelling. Miss Cram knew nothing about the false Dr Stone's plot, and Griselda and Dennis confess to having threatened Mrs Price-Ridley as a practical joke. Griselda tells her husband that she is pregnant.

== Principal characters ==
- Miss Jane Marple: an observant and astute spinster living in St Mary Mead, next door to the vicar.
- Colonel Lucius Protheroe: a wealthy man, the churchwarden and local magistrate in St Mary Mead, who lives at Old Hall. The victim in the case.
- Anne Protheroe: the second wife of Colonel Protheroe, young and attractive. She is having an affair with Lawrence Redding.
- Lettice Protheroe: Colonel Protheroe's daughter from his first marriage, to Mrs Estelle Lestrange. She despises Anne Protheroe, her stepmother.
- Leonard Clement: the vicar of St Mary Mead and narrator of the story, in his early forties.
- Griselda Clement: the vicar's young wife.
- Dennis Clement: the vicar's teenage nephew, part of his household.
- Mary Adams: the Clements' housemaid and cook. In a relationship with Bill Archer.
- Mr Hawes: Clement's curate, newly arrived in the parish.
- Mrs Martha Price Ridley: a widow and gossip.
- Miss Amanda Hartnell: a spinster in St Mary Mead.
- Miss Caroline Wetherby: a spinster in St Mary Mead .
- Dr Haydock: a doctor living in St Mary Mead.
- Lawrence Redding: a painter who fought in the First World War. He uses a building in the vicarage grounds as his studio and has been painting a number of women in St Mary Mead. He is having an affair with Anne Protheroe.
- Mrs Estelle Lestrange: an elegant woman who came to the village recently and keeps to herself. Lettice Protheroe is her daughter.
- Raymond West: Miss Marple's nephew, a writer who usually lives in London.
- Rose and Gladdie: the parlour maid and the kitchen maid respectively at Old Hall, Colonel Protheroe's house.
- Bill Archer: a local poacher
- Inspector Slack: the local police detective.
- Colonel Melchett: the Chief Constable for the county.
- Dr Stone: a fraudulent archaeologist carrying out a dig on Colonel Protheroe's land.
- Gladys Cram: Dr Stone's secretary, in her early twenties.

== Literary significance and reception ==
The Times Literary Supplement of 6 November 1930 concluded, "As a detective story, the only fault of this one is that it is hard to believe the culprit could kill Prothero [sic] so quickly and quietly. The three plans of the room, garden, and village show that almost within sight and hearing was Miss Marple, who 'always knew every single thing that happened and drew the worst inferences.' And three other 'Parish cats' (admirably portrayed) were in the next three houses. It is Miss Marple who does detect the murderer in the end, but one suspects she would have done it sooner in reality."

The review of the novel in The New York Times Book Review of 30 November 1930 begins, "The talented Miss Christie is far from being at her best in her latest mystery story. It will add little to her eminence in the field of detective fiction." The review went on to say that, "the local sisterhood of spinsters is introduced with much gossip and click-clack. A bit of this goes a long way and the average reader is apt to grow weary of it all, particularly of the amiable Miss Marple, who is sleuth-in-chief of the affair." The reviewer summarised the set-up of the plot and concluded, "The solution is a distinct anti-climax."

H.C. O'Neill, in The Observer of 12 December 1930, wrote, "here is a straightforward story which very pleasantly draws a number of red herrings across the docile reader's path. There is a distinct originality in her new expedient for keeping the secret. She discloses it at the outset, turns it inside out, apparently proves that the solution cannot be true, and so produces an atmosphere of bewilderment."

In the Daily Express of 16 October 1930, Harold Nicolson said, "I have read better works by Agatha Christie, but that does not mean that this last book is not more cheerful, more amusing, and more seductive than the generality of detective novels." In a short review dated 15 October 1930, the Daily Mirror review declared: "Bafflement is well sustained."

Sixty years later, Robert Barnard wrote that the novel is "[o]ur first glimpse of St Mary Mead, a hotbed of burglary, impersonation, adultery and ultimately murder. What is it precisely that people find so cosy about such stories?" He found the resolution a little hard to believe, but believed that the story was more appealing to readers of 1990 than to those of 1930. "The solution boggles the mind somewhat, but there are too many incidental pleasures to complain, and the strong dose of vinegar in this first sketch of Miss Marple is more to modern taste than the touch of syrup in later presentations."

Christie herself later wrote: "Reading Murder at the Vicarage now, I am not so pleased with it as I was at the time. It has, I think, far too many characters, and too many sub-plots. But at any rate the main plot is sound."

== Dedication ==
The novel is dedicated to Agatha Christie's only child, Rosalind Hicks (1919–2004), daughter of her first marriage to Archibald Christie (1890–1962). Rosalind was eleven years of age at the time of the publication.

== Allusions in other novels ==
The character of Miss Marple had previously appeared in short stories published in magazines from December 1927 onwards. These earlier stories were collected in The Thirteen Problems in 1932. The vicar and his wife, Leonard and Griselda Clement, who make their first appearance in this novel, continued to appear in Miss Marple stories. They feature in The Body in the Library (1942), along with Slack and Melchett, and in 4:50 from Paddington (1957).

== Adaptations ==
=== Murder at the Vicarage (1949 play) ===
The story was adapted into a play by Moie Charles and Barbara Toy in 1949, which opened at the Playhouse Theatre on 16 December 1949. Miss Marple was played by Barbara Mullen.

=== Television adaptations ===
The BBC adapted the book into a film which was first broadcast on 25 December 1986, with Joan Hickson as Miss Marple, Paul Eddington as the vicar, and Polly Adams as Anne Protheroe.

It was presented again in 2004 by Granada Television in the ITV series Agatha Christie's Marple with Geraldine McEwan as Miss Marple, Tim McInnerny as the vicar, Derek Jacobi as Colonel Protheroe, and Janet McTeer as Anne.

The novel was adapted as a 2016 episode of the French television series Les Petits Meurtres d'Agatha Christie.

=== Audio adaptations ===
The book was adapted into a five episode radio play by Michael Bakewell, with June Whitfield as Miss Marple, Francis Matthews as the Rev. Leonard Clement, and Imelda Staunton as Griselda Clement. This adaptation was first broadcast by the BBC in December 1993.

Audible has released an audio dramatisation in 2026, with Toni Collette as Miss Marple, and Kit Harington as Rev. Clement.

=== Graphic novel adaptation ===
The Murder at the Vicarage was released by HarperCollins as a graphic novel adaptation on 20 May 2008, adapted and illustrated by "Norma" (Norbert Morandière). This was translated from the edition first published in France by Emmanuel Proust éditions in 2005 under the title of L'Affaire Prothéroe.

== Publication history ==
The novel was first serialised in the US in the Chicago Tribune in fifty-five instalments from Monday, 18 August to Monday, 20 October 1930.
