= Partners in Crime =

Partners in Crime may refer to:

== Literature ==
- Partners in Crime (short story collection), a 1929 collection of mystery stories by Agatha Christie
- Partners in Crime (Hinojosa novel), a 1985 novel by Rolando Hinojosa
- Partners in Crime (Hinton novel), a 2003 novel by Nigel Hinton

== Music ==
- Partners in Crime, a 1978 album by Bandit
- Partners in Crime (album), a 1979 album by Rupert Holmes
- "Partners in Crime", song by Mr. Mister from their debut album I Wear the Face, recorded in 1983
- Partners in Kryme, an American rap duo, formed in 1990
- "Partners in Crime" (song), performed at the 2007 Eurovision Song Contest
- "Partners in Crime", a 2016 song by Ocean Alley from their album Lost Tropics
- "Partners in Crime", a song by Roger McGuinn and Jacques Levy from McGuinn's 1976 album Cardiff Rose
- "Partners in Crime", a 2012 song by Set it Off featuring Ashley Costello
- "Partners in Crime", a 2012 song by the Strokes from their album Comedown Machine

== Film ==
- Partners in Crime (1928 film), an American silent film
- Partners in Crime (1937 film), an American film
- Partners in Crime (1942 film), a British film
- Partners in Crime (1961 film), a British film
- Partners in Crime (1973 film), an American TV movie
- Partners in Crime (2014 film), a Taiwanese film
- Partners in Crime (2022 film), a Filipino film

== Television ==
- Agatha Christie's Partners in Crime, a 1983 TV series based on the short story collection
- Partners in Crime (American TV series), a 1984 detective series starring Lynda Carter and Loni Anderson
- Partners in Crime (UK TV series), a 2015 television series based on Agatha Christie's novels
- "Partners in Crime" (Doctor Who), a 2008 episode of Doctor Who

== Radio ==
- Partners in Crime (radio series), 1953
