= Agatha Christie's Tommy & Tuppence =

- Genre: Mystery
- Based on: Tommy and Tuppence by Agatha Christie
- Written by: Phoebe Eclair-Powell
- Directed by: Chris Sweeney
- Starring: Antonia Thomas; Josh Dylan; Imelda Staunton
- Country of origin: United Kingdom
- Original language: English
- No. of series: 1
- No. of episodes: 6

Production
- Executive producers: Robert Schildhouse; Jon Farrar; Stephen Nye; Laura Lankester; Katie Draper; Louise Mutter; James Prichard; Phoebe Eclair-Powell
- Producer: Joanna Crow
- Production companies: Lookout Point; Agatha Christie Limited.

Original release
- Network: BritBox
- Release: 15 September 2026

Agatha Christie's Tommy & Tuppence is a British mystery drama television series, based on Agatha Christie's characters Tommy and Tuppence. The series is an adaptation of the Tommy and Tuppence books, with the setting changed from the 20th Century to the present day.

The series debuted on BritBox on 15 September 2026.

== Premise ==
Actress Tuppence Cowley and crime novelist Tommy Beresford are a former couple who reunite at a wedding when a fellow guest is killed. Their attempts to prove the police have the wrong person in custody leads to them becoming amateur investigators, with the aid of Tommy's aunt Ada, who used to run a detective agency.

== Cast ==
=== Main ===
- Antonia Thomas as Tuppence Cowley
- Josh Dylan as Tommy Beresford
- Imelda Staunton as Aunt Ada

=== Recurring ===
- Chizzy Akudolu as Detective Inspector Merriot
- Callie Cooke as Detective Sergeant Draper
- Charlie Condou as Albert
- Phoebe Knight as Liberty
- Emilia Knight as Verity
- Eleanor Fanyinka as Constance
- Alice Krige as Mrs. Lancaster
- Natasha Joseph as Nurse Packford
- Nicholas Richardson as Julius

=== Guest ===
- Madeleine Walker as Alice
- Toby Regbo as Bingo
- Della Saba as Lina
- Fola Evans-Akingbola as Tatiana
- Sebastian De Souza as Sebastian
- Sean Pertwee as Simon
- Ishia Bennison as Gladys
- Amalia Vitale as Pippa
- Saffron Burrows as Gilda Glen
- Alex Jennings as Archie St. Vincent
- Geoffrey McGivern as Marvin
- Lucie Shorthouse as Mary
- Denise Black as Miranda
- Rudolphe Mdlongwa as Ssega
- Orlando Seale as Omar
- Maggie Bain as Steph
- Vera Chok as Rachel
- Michelle Greenidge as Mrs. Asante
- Felicity Walton as Susan
- Anna Calder-Marshall as Mrs. Moody
- Gerald Kyd as Amos
- Alexa Davies as Fran
- Alara-Star Khan as Hetty
- Stephanie Fayerman as Ellie
- Adrian Rawlins as Boscowan
- Poppy Miller as Reverend Bly
- Nicholas Farrell as Sir Philip Starke

== Production ==
A contemporary six episode retelling of the Tommy and Tuppence books for BritBox was announced in June 2025. In August, the two leads were cast in Antonia Thomas and Josh Dylan, along with Imelda Staunton.

The series was filmed in London. It is set for release on September 15, 2026.

== Episodes ==
No.	Title	Directed by	Written by	Original release date
1	"Episode 1"	Fergus O'Brien	Phoebe Eclair-Powell	15 September 2026
Adapted from the short story "Finessing the King/The Gentleman Dressed in Newspaper".
2	"Episode 2"	Fergus O'Brien	Phoebe Eclair-Powell	15 September 2026
Adapted from the short story "Finessing the King/The Gentleman Dressed in Newspaper".
3	"Episode 3"	Fergus O'Brien	Phoebe Eclair-Powell	22 September 2026
An original idea that draws elements from the short stories "The Affair of the Pink Pearl" and "The Man in the Mist".
4	"Episode 4"	Fergus O'Brien	Phoebe Eclair-Powell	29 September 2026
An original idea that draws elements from the short stories "The Affair of the Pink Pearl" and "The Man in the Mist".
5	"Episode 5"	Ellie Heydon	Phoebe Eclair-Powell	6 October 2026
Adapted from the novel "By the Pricking of My Thumbs".
6	"Episode 6"	Ellie Heydon	Phoebe Eclair-Powell	13 October 2026
Adapted from the novel "By the Pricking of My Thumbs".
