= Tommy and Tuppence =

Fictional characters in Agatha Christie mysteries

- Illustration by Arthur Ferrier of Tommy and Tuppence from the December 1923 issue of The Grand Magazine and the first-known image of the characters
- First appearance: The Secret Adversary
- Last appearance: Postern of Fate
- Created by: Agatha Christie
- Portrayed by: Richard Attenborough and Sheila Sim (radio); James Warwick and Francesca Annis; André Dussollier and Catherine Frot; Anthony Andrews and Greta Scacchi; David Walliams and Jessica Raine; Josh Dylan and Antonia Thomas

In-universe information
- Gender: Male/Female
- Occupation: Secret agents/private detectives
- Family: Derek (son); Deborah (daughter); Betty (adopted daughter)
- Nationality: British

Tommy and Tuppence are two fictional detectives, recurring characters in the work of Agatha Christie. Their full names are Thomas Beresford and his wife Prudence (née Cowley). Tommy and Tuppence first appeared in Christie's The Secret Adversary (1922). They started out their career in search of adventure and money, and the detecting life soon proved profitable and very exciting.

== Books ==
- The Secret Adversary (1922 novel)
- Partners in Crime (1929 short story collection)
- N or M? (1941 novel)
- By the Pricking of My Thumbs (1968 novel)
- Postern of Fate (1973 novel)

== Characters ==
Tuppence appears as a charismatic, impulsive, and intuitive person while Tommy is less imaginative and less likely to be diverted from the truth (as their first adversary sums him up: "he is not clever, but it is hard to blind his eyes to the facts") which is why they are shown to make a good team. It is in the first book The Secret Adversary that they meet up after the war (World War I), and come to realise that, although they have been friends for most of their lives, they have now fallen in love with each other.

Unlike many other recurring detective characters, including the better known Christie detectives, Tommy and Tuppence aged in time with the real world, being in their early twenties in The Secret Adversary and in their seventies in Postern of Fate. In their early appearances, they are portrayed as typical young people of the 1920s, and the stories and settings have a more pronounced period-specific flavor than other stories featuring more popular Christie characters. As they age, they are revealed to have raised three children – twins Deborah and Derek and an adopted daughter, Betty. Throughout the series they employ a man named Albert, who first appears as a lift boy who helps them in The Secret Adversary, their hapless assistant at a private detective agency in Partners in Crime, and subsequently, as a now married pub owner, renders vital assistance to the pair in N or M?. By Postern of Fate he has become the Beresfords' butler and has now been widowed. In Postern of Fate the Beresfords also own a small dog named Hannibal.

== Biography ==
In their first case, The Secret Adversary (1922), Thomas "Tommy" Beresford is introduced as a young redheaded Englishman who fought in the Great War, wounded twice. Prudence L. "Tuppence" Cowley is introduced as a young woman with black bobbed hair. She is one of several children of a conservative archdeacon, and served in the Voluntary Aid Detachment during the Great War.

With the Great War over, jobs are scarce and both characters are unemployed. They are childhood friends and reunite after the war. They agree to start their own business as The Young Adventurers. They are soon hired by Mr Carter, a British intelligence leader. They are asked to search for Jane Finn, a survivor of RMS Lusitania's sinking who disappeared along with documents of a secret treaty.

Following the successful conclusion of their first case, Tommy is chosen as the heir of a rich uncle. Having fallen in love during the case, Tommy and Tuppence are engaged to marry.

In their second recorded case, A Fairy in the Flat, they are rehired by Mr Carter, on behalf of a government intelligence agency. They are placed as the new owners of Theodore Blunt's International Detective Agency, a recently cleaned-out spy stronghold. Their real mission is to intercept enemy messages, but in the meantime they handle their agency's cases.

In the Partners in Crime collection short story "The Man Who Was No. 16", the two successfully apprehend No. 16, a Soviet spy, and then decide to give up the agency. At that point, Tuppence reveals to Tommy that she is pregnant.

Their third recorded case, N or M? (1941), takes place during World War II, and the couple has reached their middle age. They had retired from British intelligence long ago, and they were feeling sidelined. They are recruited by British intelligence again, to hunt German spies and fifth columnists. Their years out of service mean that they are unknown to traitors within British intelligence.

Their fourth case, By the Pricking of My Thumbs (1968), takes place when the two are a mature couple. Tommy's aunt Ada dies in the retirement home Sunny Ridge, and Ada's acquaintance Mrs Lancaster disappears soon afterwards. Tuppence is determined to locate the missing woman, and in the process learns of an unsolved series of child murders. Tuppence slowly realizes that she may be the killer's next victim.

Their fifth and last case, Postern of Fate (1973), takes place when the couple are elderly and in at least their 70s. They have reached their retirement years, and purchase an old house in a quiet village in order to live out their retirement in peace. But an old book within the house contains a coded message, concerning the "unnatural" death of Mary Jordan. The elderly couple decide to investigate a cold case.

== Adaptations ==
In 1953 the BBC adapted Partners in Crime as a radio series starring Richard Attenborough and Sheila Sim.

The Tommy and Tuppence characters have been portrayed on television by James Warwick and Francesca Annis, first in the feature-length The Secret Adversary (1982), and then in the 10-episode series Agatha Christie's Partners in Crime (1983).

The novel By the Pricking of My Thumbs was adapted in 2005 by the French director Pascal Thomas with the title Mon petit doigt m'a dit.... The film casts André Dussolier as Tommy (renamed Bélisaire) and Catherine Frot as Prudence Beresford. The action is transposed to Savoie in France. A second film Le crime est notre affaire, came out in 2008. Le crime est notre affaire is named after Partners in Crime and stars the Beresfords, but its story is based on 4:50 from Paddington, which was originally a novel starring Miss Marple. A third film Associés contre le crime is very, very loosely based (to the point of being unrecognisable) on one of the stories in Partners in Crime.

An adaptation of By the Pricking of My Thumbs appeared in 2006 as an episode of the Granada television series Marple even though Christie did not write Miss Marple into the original story. In this version, Tommy and Tuppence were played by Anthony Andrews and Greta Scacchi respectively, but, unlike in the book, Miss Marple and Tuppence play the detective roles while Tommy is away on intelligence (MI6) business.

In 2015 BBC television aired Partners in Crime, it starred David Walliams as Tommy and Jessica Raine as Tuppence.

A six episode series is airing on BritBox in 2026, written by Phoebe Eclair-Powell. Set in the present day, the series stars Antonia Thomas as Tuppence and Josh Dylan as Tommy.
