= John Tribe =

English illustrator and graphic designer (born 1938)

John Tribe (born 10 June 1938) is an English illustrator and graphic designer best known for his work for the British television broadcaster London Weekend Television, which presently forms part of the ITV network. In 1985, he won the Primetime Emmy Award for Outstanding Graphic and Title Design for his work on the ten part television series: Agatha Christie's Partners in Crime (1983).

== London Weekend Television ==
Tribe was a member of the Art Department at the Greater London network and his work involved creating title sequences and artwork for the following programmes:

Programme	Format	Year
The Fosters	(TV series)	1976
Love For Lydia	(TV series)	1977
Mixed Blessings	(TV series)	1978
End of Part One	(TV series)	1978-1980
Canned Laughter	(TV short)	1979
Why Didn't They Ask Evans?	(TV movie)	1980
Seven Dials Mystery	(TV movie)	1981
The Goodies	(TV series)	1982
The Secret Adversary	(TV movie)	1983
Agatha Christie's Partners in Crime	(TV series)	1983-1984
A Little Princess	(TV series)	1986
Hot Metal	(TV series)	1986-1988
The Piglet Files	(TV series)	1990-1992
