= N or M? =

1941 mystery novel by Agatha Christie

- True first edition (1941) of the novel, first printed in the US
- Author: Agatha Christie
- Language: English
- Genre: Crime novel
- Publisher: Dodd, Mead and Company
- Publication date: 1941
- Publication place: United Kingdom
- Media type: Print (hardback & paperback)
- Pages: 289 (first edition, hardback)
- ISBN: 0-425-09845-1
- Preceded by: Evil Under the Sun
- Followed by: The Body in the Library

N or M? is a mystery novel by Agatha Christie first published in the US by Dodd, Mead and Company in 1941 and in the UK by the Collins Crime Club in November of the same year. The US edition retailed $2.00 and the UK edition at seven shillings and sixpence (7/6).

The title is taken from a catechism in the Book of Common Prayer which asks, "What is your Christian name? Answer N. or M." The "N. or M." here stands for the Latin, "nomen vel nomina", meaning "name or names". It was an accident of typography that "nomina" ("nn") came to be represented by "m".

The novel is the first to feature the mature versions of her detectives Tommy and Tuppence, whose previous appearances had been in the adventure The Secret Adversary (1922) and the short story collection Partners in Crime (1929).

== Plot introduction ==
After the outbreak of the Second World War and many years after they worked for British intelligence, middle-aged Tommy and Tuppence Beresford feel useless and sidelined. Then, Tommy is approached by a secret agent named Grant to go undercover once more. Grant tries to find German spies and fifth columnists but is hampered by traitors within British intelligence who follow and sabotage his work. Since Tommy has not been in the field for many years, nobody knows him, and he can investigate unofficially.

Grant explains that another British agent was recently murdered but left a cryptic message on his deathbed: "N or M. Song Susie". Grant suspects that "Song Susie" stands for Sans Souci, a hotel in (fictional) seaside Leahampton (based on Bournemouth), and "N" and "M" are known to be two top German spies, one male and one female. Tommy is to go to Sans Souci to investigate whether N, M or both are at the hotel and to figure out their identities.

Tommy is sent alone, but Tuppence decides to join him on his mission whether invited or not. Through good sleuthing, she learns where he is to be sent and arrives there before he does. Working together under separate false identities, they begin a search for the spies among the residents of the resort town. As everyone seems, in turn, suspicious and not, Tommy and Tuppence follow exciting leads that lead close to peril.

Both N and M's identities are revealed at the end of the book; "N" is a top German spy, who is shot by British intelligence at the book's conclusion as he threatens Tuppence's life, and "M" is his female co-conspirator.

== Literary significance and reception ==
Maurice Willson Disher's review in The Times Literary Supplement of 29 November 1941 began, "To believe that N or M? is not Miss Agatha Christie's best is difficult while the first fine anxious rapture of her latest story is still troubling the mind." He concluded, "The point is reached when you begin to fear for your own sanity on catching yourself wondering whether an ingratiating babe-in-arms might not be Herr Doktor in disguise. Yet such is Miss Christie's skill in conjuring up the ominous that even infant prattle sounds uncommonly like a code for the Fifth Column. In other words, as Mr Robey has said before now, N or M? gets you."

Maurice Richardson in a short review in the 7 December 1941 issue of The Observer wrote: "Agatha Christie takes time off from Poirot and the haute cuisine of crime to write a light war-time spy thriller. N or M is [an] unknown master fifth columnist concealed in [the] person of some shabby genteel figure in a Bournemouth boarding-house ... Christie's bright young couple, now middle-aged but active as ever, are nearly trapped. Nice surprise finish and all-round entertainment."

A short review by E.R. Punshon in The Guardian of 30 December 1941 ended with "Mrs Christie shows herself as ingenious as ever, and one admires especially the way in which the hero snores himself out of captivity."

In 1990, in a revised edition of his 1980 work, Robert Barnard wrote: "The Beresfords contribute their intolerable high spirits to the war effort. Less racist than the earlier thrillers (in fact, some apology is made indirectly) but no more convincing."

== MI5 investigation of Christie ==
Around 1941 or 1942, the British intelligence agency MI5 temporarily investigated Christie herself as she had named one of her characters in this novel as a certain Major Bletchley. MI5 was afraid that Christie had a spy in Britain's top-secret codebreaking centre, Bletchley Park. MI5's fears were eventually assuaged when Christie revealed to Dilly Knox, who helped break the Enigma machine cypher used by German secret service officers sending spies to Britain, that Major Bletchley, "one of my least lovable characters", was merely named after the town of Bletchley (now part of Milton Keynes) which she once happened to be stuck in during a train journey.

== TV adaptation ==
The UK television channel BBC One began airing a 3-part adaptation of N or M? on 16 August 2015. The adaptation was aired as part of the Partners in Crime series.

== Publication history ==
UK first edition (November 1941)

- 1941, Dodd Mead and Company (New York), 1941, Hardback, 289 pp
- 1941, Collins Crime Club (London), November 1941, Hardback, 192 pp
- 1947, Dell Books, Paperback, 191 pp (Dell number 187 [mapback]),
- 1959, Pan Books, Paperback, 188 pp (Great Pan G259)
- 1962, Fontana Books (Imprint of HarperCollins), Paperback, 192 pp
- 1972, Greenway edition of collected works (William Collins), Hardcover, 224 pp; ISBN 0-00-231567-X
- 1974, Greenway edition of collected works (Dodd Mead), Hardcover, 224 pp
- 1984, Ulverscroft Large-print Edition, Hardcover; ISBN 0-7089-1156-0

The novel first appeared in the US in a condensed version in the March 1941 (Volume 76, Number 5) issue of Redbook magazine, with an illustration by Alan Haemer.

In the UK, an abridged version was serialized in seven parts in Woman's Pictorial from 26 April (Volume 41, Number 1059) to 7 June 1941 (Volume 41, Number 1065) under the title Secret Adventure. All the installments were illustrated by Clive Uptton.
