= Tom Moran =

British screenwriter (born 1987)

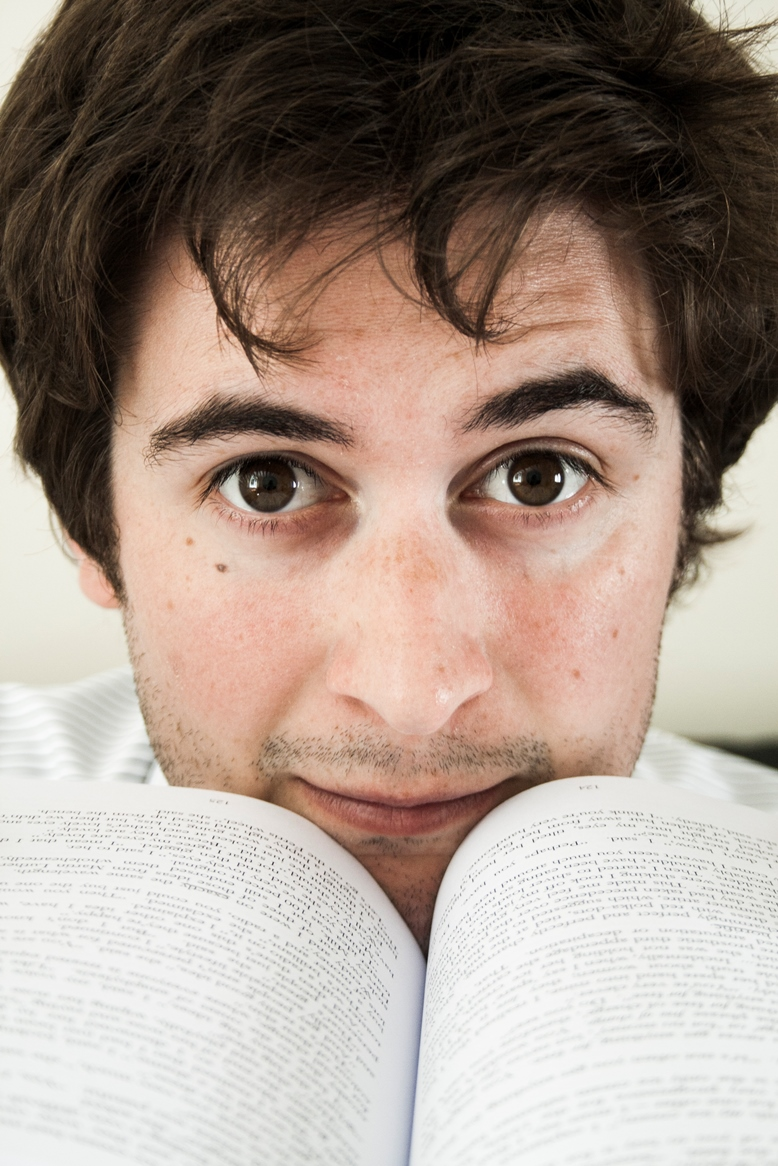
- Occupations: Screenwriter, comedian

Tom Moran is a British screenwriter.

== Career ==
Moran grew up near Membury, Devon and attended Colyton Grammar School. While studying for a degree in Scriptwriting and Performance at the University of East Anglia, he set up Laugh Out Loud comedy club. He subsequently performed a 21-night show at the Edinburgh Fringe Festival.

In 2014, Moran won the Guardian and Legend Press' new prize for self-published fiction. Following the prize, Moran has received attention in various publications including the Washington Post.

In 2015, Moran was named as one of the BAFTA Rocliffe New Comedy Writing Forum winners for his new sitcom, Printheads. The prize culminated in a showcase at the New York Television Festival, where professional actors performed the script live. At the festival, Moran won the AMC-Channel 4 Drama Co-Development Award for his sci-fi pilot White Rabbit.

Moran wrote and executive produced the Amazon Prime Video thriller television series The Devil's Hour.

== Screenwriter filmography ==
Television
Year	Title	Notes
2019	Wild Bill	Episode: "Bad Blood in the Soil"
2019	The Feed	2 episodes
2022–present	The Devil's Hour	Creator and executive producer

== Bibliography ==
Overview of Tom Moran novels
Year	Title	ISBN	Pages
2012	Dinosaurs and Prime Numbers	978-1-481-88942-1	290
2013	A Scandal in Spixworth	978-1-301-00409-6	74
2016	A Debt to the Universe	978-1-537-27251-1	316
2016	The Trojan Hearse		73
2016	From Hellesdon		85
