= The Devil's Hour =

British thriller television series

- Genre: Thriller; Drama; Supernatural
- Created by: Tom Moran
- Written by: Tom Moran
- Starring: Jessica Raine; Peter Capaldi; Nikesh Patel
- Music by: The Newton Brothers
- Country of origin: United Kingdom
- Original language: English
- No. of series: 2
- No. of episodes: 11

Production
- Executive producers: Sue Vertue; Steven Moffat; Tom Moran
- Production locations: London; Farnborough Film Studios; Wokingham
- Cinematography: Stuart Biddlecombe; Bjørn Ståle Bratberg
- Editors: Joe Randall-Cutler; Mark Trend
- Running time: 57–70 minutes
- Production companies: Hartswood Films; Amazon Studios

Original release
- Network: Amazon Prime Video
- Release: 28 October 2022 – present

The Devil's Hour is a British drama thriller television series created by Tom Moran, and executive produced by Sue Vertue and Steven Moffat through their production company Hartswood Films. The first series consists of six episodes, and premiered on 28 October 2022 on Amazon Prime Video. The series was renewed for a second and third series, and the second series premiered on 18 October 2024. The third and final series is expected to premiere on 4 December 2026.

== Plot ==
Lucy Chambers is a social worker dealing with family and relationship woes. She wakes every night at exactly 3:33 AM, after experiencing terrifying visions during the so-called "devil's hour" and having snippets of visions during the day. Her eight-year-old son is withdrawn and seems completely emotionless, claiming to see people others do not. Her mother speaks to empty chairs, also seeming to see people that others do not. Lucy's house is haunted by the echoes of a life that is not her own. Her name is inexplicably connected to a string of brutal murders in the area, and she is drawn into the hunt for a serial killer.

== Cast and characters ==
- Jessica Raine as Lucy Chambers, a social worker suffering from visions and premonitions, and a DI in another iteration of her life
- Peter Capaldi as Gideon Shepherd, a mysterious criminal who "remembers" the future
- Nikesh Patel as Ravi Dhillon, a detective inspector with haemophobia
- Alex Ferns as Nick Holness, Dhillon's partner, a detective sergeant
- Meera Syal as Ruby Bennett, a child psychologist treating Isaac
- Barbara Marten as Sylvia Chambers, Lucy's mother who has dementia and schizophrenia
- Phil Dunster as Mike Stevens (series 1; guest series 2), Lucy's estranged husband and Isaac's father
- Benjamin Chivers as Isaac Stevens, Lucy and Mike's emotionally troubled son
- Saffron Hocking as Sam Boyd (series 2)
- Thomas Dominique as Lee Warren
- Rhiannon Harper-Rafferty as Debbie Warren

== Production ==
=== Development ===
In December 2019, it was announced Tom Moran was developing The Devil's Hour for Amazon. In June 2021, it was announced Amazon had greenlit the series. The series is written and created by Moran, who also serves as an executive producer along with Steven Moffat and Sue Vertue. The series is produced by Hartswood Films. Johnny Allan and Isabelle Sieb were set to direct episodes of the series.

In November 2022, the show was renewed for a second and third series.

=== Casting ===
In mid-June 2021, Jessica Raine and Peter Capaldi were cast as the leads. Nikesh Patel, Meera Syal, Alex Ferns, Phil Dunster, Barbara Marten, Thomas Dominique, Rhiannon Harper-Rafferty, John Alastair, Sandra Huggett, and Benjamin Chivers were also cast.

=== Title sequence ===
The title sequence is a stylised interpretation of a "vortex", featuring kaleidoscopic effects and bright colour overlays. It was made in London by Peter Anderson Studio.

=== Music ===
The series' score is composed by the Newton Brothers, and the soundtrack album was released on 28 October, the same day as the series release.

The Devil's Hour: Season 1 (Amazon Original Series Soundtrack)
No.	Title	Length
1.	"The Devil's Hour Main Titles I"	1:35
2.	"3:33"	3:11
3.	"Sleepwalking"	4:11
4.	"Pink Sunflowers"	1:31
5.	"Meredith Warren"	3:17
6.	"Dreams"	1:38
7.	"The Lodge"	3:08
8.	"There Is No Beginning, No End – I"	3:50
9.	"Concentric Circles"	4:40
10.	"Putting Together the Pieces"	1:19
11.	"Dear Lucy"	3:23
12.	"There Is No Beginning, No End – II"	2:15
13.	"I Need It to Be Over – Reprise"	3:25
14.	"I Need It to Be Over – The Darkness"	3:13
15.	"I Need It to Be Over – The Light"	4:07
16.	"Speed Kings"	1:13
17.	"Malcolm"	3:07
18.	"Halstead's Paradise"	2:59
19.	"I Need to Know"	1:11
20.	"The Red Box (Whiskey Concussion)"	3:08
21.	"And Again and Again"	3:32
22.	"Emotional Anomaly"	3:01
23.	"Scents of Balance"	3:51
24.	"There Is No Beginning, No End – III"	3:41
25.	"There Is No Beginning, No End – IV"	6:27
26.	"The Devil's Hour Main Titles VI"	0:55
Total length:		77:48

== Episodes ==
Series	Episodes	Originally released
1	6	28 October 2022
2	5	18 October 2024

=== Series 1 (2022) ===
No. overall	No. in series	Title	Directed by	Written by	Original release date
1	1	"3.33"	Johnny Allan	Tom Moran	28 October 2022
2	2	"The Velveteen Rabbit"	Johnny Allan	Tom Moran	28 October 2022
3	3	"Tchaikovsky"	Johnny Allan	Tom Moran	28 October 2022
4	4	"After the Storm"	Isabelle Sieb	Tom Moran	28 October 2022
5	5	"The Half of Ourselves We Have Lost"	Isabelle Sieb	Tom Moran	28 October 2022
6	6	"Amor Fati"	Johnny Allan	Tom Moran	28 October 2022

=== Series 2 (2024) ===
No. overall	No. in series	Title	Directed by	Written by	Original release date
7	1	"DI Chambers"	Johnny Allan	Tom Moran	18 October 2024
8	2	"Red Lines"	Johnny Allan	Tom Moran	18 October 2024
9	3	"Something Beginning With D"	Shaun James Grant	Tom Moran	18 October 2024
10	4	"Far Away"	Shaun James Grant	Tom Moran	18 October 2024
11	5	"Birth of a Tragedy"	Johnny Allan	Tom Moran	18 October 2024

== Release ==
The first series premiered on 28 October 2022 on Amazon Prime Video and consists of six episodes. In November 2022, the programme was renewed for a second and third series. The second series consists of five episodes and premiered on Prime Video on 18 October 2024. The third series, which consists of 5 episodes, is set to premiere on 4 December 2026.

== Reception ==
On Rotten Tomatoes 95% of 19 critic reviews are positive, with an average rating of 7.1/10. On Metacritic it has a score of 71 based on reviews from 5 critics, indicating "generally favorable" reviews.

Lucy Mangan of The Guardian awarded the first episode four stars out of five, praising Raine and Capaldi's performances. Amanda Whiting of The Independent gave the first two episodes four out of five stars, dubbing it "haunting". Jasper Rees of The Daily Telegraph gave it three stars out of five, remarking that "There's certainly pleasure to be had from the denouement, and from Raine’s protean turn as the figure trapped in a horror mystery. But some may find that gratification is too teasingly postponed."

Martin Carr of the Radio Times also gave it three stars out of five, stating, "The Devil's Hour fails to concisely pull all its puzzle pieces together and satisfy. There is a sense of kitchen sink in the construction, which may make audiences think twice before investing valuable time in this convoluted premise."
