= Partners in Crime (British TV series) =

British television series

- Also known as: Agatha Christie's Partners in Crime
- Genre: Cosy mystery; Crime drama
- Based on: Partners in Crime, The Secret Adversary and N or M? by Agatha Christie
- Written by: Zinnie Harris; Claire Wilson
- Directed by: Edward Hall
- Starring: David Walliams; Jessica Raine; James Fleet; Matthew Steer
- Composer: Tim Phillips
- Country of origin: United Kingdom
- Original language: English
- No. of series: 1
- No. of episodes: 6

Production
- Executive producers: Hilary Bevan Jones; Hilary Strong; Mathew Prichard; Matthew Read; David Walliams
- Producer: Georgina Lowe
- Cinematography: David Higgs
- Running time: 60 minutes
- Production companies: Endor Productions; Agatha Christie Productions

Original release
- Network: BBC One; Ovation; Acorn TV
- Release: 26 July – 30 August 2015

Partners in Crime is a British crime drama television series that began on BBC One on 26 July 2015. The six-part series is based on Tommy and Tuppence by Agatha Christie. It was not renewed for a second series by the BBC.

The title is taken from the short story collection Partners in Crime. The first three episodes are adapted from the 1922 novel The Secret Adversary, and the last three episodes from the 1941 novel N or M?

== Alterations ==
The action is updated from the 1922 and 1941 settings of the novels to the 1950s, and the era of the Cold War against Stalin.

== Characters ==
Thomas (Tommy) Beresford (David Walliams), in his early 40s, is a clever and logical man whose business ventures never quite work out, just as his university and army days were never successful. He tries to look after his spirited wife, Tuppence, and his son, George, by various money-making schemes. He does not realise that he has no head for business, but he does have a knack for espionage and crime-solving in a Cold War world full of double agents and assassins. It is a perilous world, in which Tommy flourishes.

Prudence (Tuppence) Beresford (Jessica Raine) is a quick-witted, irrepressible woman with a tendency to leap without looking. The daughter of a country archdeacon, one of five children, she misses the sense of purpose she had as a nurse in the war and cannot settle as a housewife, despite her love for Tommy and their son, George. When the opportunity is presented to aid British Intelligence in the defence of her country, she jumps at the chance to put herself, and her less willing husband, in harm's way.

Major Anthony Carter (James Fleet) is Tommy's uncle and head of "The Third Floor", a branch of British Military Intelligence. In the war, Carter knew who the enemy was, but now, in the 1950s, the adversary is a new type of spy. Carter tries to protect his hapless nephew Tommy and Tommy's wife, Tuppence, as they become involved in his new war.

Albert Pemberton (Matthew Steer) is a chemistry teacher and part-time agent for Carter. He met Tommy in hospital whilst recovering from losing a hand when working for a bomb-disposal unit. He assists Tommy and Tuppence when they require more technical knowledge, and he revels in their adventures.

== Production ==
The series was commissioned by Ben Stephenson and Charlotte Moore for the BBC to mark the 125th anniversary of Agatha Christie's birth. The adaptation was produced by Endor Productions in partnership with Agatha Christie Productions.

=== Conception ===
David Walliams and Hilary Strong (Agatha Christie Group) approached Hilary Bevan Jones and Tom Nash (development producer) of Endor Productions with the idea of re-inventing the Agatha Christie characters Tommy and Tuppence Beresford. Walliams liked the idea of a married amateur detective duo bickering over a dead body.

Agatha Christie wrote stories featuring the Beresfords between 1922 and 1973, depicting Tommy and Tuppence from before they were married through to their old age with adult children. It was decided to set the series in the 1950s, in the context of the Cold War, which could be made to fit Christie's existing stories. The two novels chosen, The Secret Adversary and N or M?, were each made into three one-hour episodes, for a total of six.

=== Casting ===
David Walliams, the main driving force and executive producer, plays Tommy. Jessica Raine plays Tuppence, and was cast for her ability to move between drama and humour.

=== Filming ===
Creating 1950s England led to filming in central and greater London, Essex, Buckinghamshire, Surrey, Oxfordshire, Kent, Hertfordshire, and Norfolk. Didcot Railway Centre and North Norfolk Railway, Sheringham were used for period railway locations. Cromer in Norfolk was used for its coastline and pier and many unspoilt buildings and streets in the town. Englefield House and derelict industrial wastelands by the Thames. The Historic Dockyard in Chatham was used for London street scenes, and Fort Amherst in Kent was featured as the coastal tunnels.

== Cast ==
=== Main ===
- David Walliams as Tommy Beresford
- Jessica Raine as Tuppence Beresford
- James Fleet as Major Anthony Carter
- Matthew Steer as Albert Pemberton

=== Guest stars ===
- Miles Roughley as George Beresford (Episode 1)
- Clarke Peters as Julius Hersheimmer (Episodes 1–3)
- Alice Krige as Rita Vandemeyer (Episodes 1–2)
- Paul Brennen as Lucky (Episodes 1–3)
- Jonny Phillips as Whittington (Episodes 1–3)
- Camilla Marie Beeput as Jane Finn (Episodes 1–3)
- Madeline Appiah as Annette (Episodes 1–3)
- Andrew Havill as James Peel (Episodes 2–3)
- Ed Speleers as Carl Denim (Episodes 4–6)
- Roy Marsden as Commander Haydock (Episodes 4–6)
- Alyy Khan as Major Khan (Episodes 4–5)
- Danny Lee Wynter as Gilbert Worthing (Episodes 4–6)
- Christina Cole as Mrs Sprot (Episodes 4–6)
- Aoife McMahon as Sheila Perenna (Episodes 4–6)
- Pinar Ogun as Veronika Urbanowicz (Episodes 4–6)
- Robert Hands as Frederick Minton (Episodes 4–6)
- Issy van Randwyck as Elizabeth Minton (Episodes 4–6)
- Tam Williams as Harrison (Episodes 4–6)
- Hannah Waddingham as Blonde Assassin (Episodes 4–6)
- Tamsin Dean as Hotel waitress (Episode 5)

== Episodes ==
No.	Title	Directed by	Written by	Original release date	Viewers (millions)
1	"The Secret Adversary – Part 1"	Edward Hall	Zinnie Harris	26 July 2015	8.78
The year is 1952. Married couple Tommy and Tuppence have a chance encounter on a Paris train with an agitated young woman, named Jane Finn, who suddenly disappears and never returns to her seat. Back in England, Tommy is focussed on their fledgling honey business, but Tuppence is much more concerned about the missing girl. Her investigations bring them into contact with Tommy’s uncle and Third Floor bigwig Major Anthony Carter. It turns out that Jane Finn was carrying a secret recording that would potentially reveal the identity of a legendary Soviet assassin, known only as Mr. Brown, who Carter believes will strike soon in Britain. Carter believes Brown’s cronies must have kidnapped Jane – he can only hope she managed to hide the recording before they got to her. Despite Carter’s attempts to keep them out of it, Tommy and Tuppence soon find themselves compelled to infiltrate Brown’s gang in the hope of finding Jane Finn and the recording and foiling Brown’s next hit.
2	"The Secret Adversary – Part 2"	Edward Hall	Zinnie Harris	2 August 2015	6.86
With Tommy mistaken for Drennan, a criminal mastermind due to join Brown’s gang from the north, and Tuppence employed as a maid to a faded soprano, Rita Vandemeyer, who has suspicious connections to Brown, the couple's investigations into Brown get deeper and more dangerous. Tommy tries to escape the pleasures of the gang’s seedy Soho den long enough to search for Jane within its dark shadowy corners and backrooms, but he is caught and must attempt to return tomorrow to try again... except this time the gang will be expecting the £1,000 Drennan was supposed to bring. In the face of ever-increasing peril and Carter’s continued obstruction, Tommy and Tuppence must somehow find the funds to allow Tommy’s re-entry to the Soho den, solve the mystery of Rita’s secret package and, for their own safety, try to maintain their cover.
3	"The Secret Adversary – Part 3"	Edward Hall	Zinnie Harris	9 August 2015	6.03
Tommy’s given a job to do for Brown on pain of the death of his son, George. He must steal a specific file from under Major Carter’s nose on the Third Floor. He succeeds, with Tuppence’s help, but they redeem themselves by solving the mystery of the location of the secret recording that will identify Brown. Our heroes must find Jane Finn and foil the potential assassination of a visiting American dignitary of incredible importance to the British government.
4	"N or M? – Part 1"	Edward Hall	Claire Wilson	16 August 2015	5.82
Carter commandeers Tommy for a mission he must keep completely secret, even from Tuppence. There is a leak on the Third Floor, and Tommy is the only man Carter can trust. A British scientist, Gilbert Worthing, who was working on a top-secret prototype for a nuclear bomb, has gone missing from a military base in Cromer, along with his work. All Tommy knows is that the perpetrator is staying at the nearby Sans Souci guesthouse and is most likely a Soviet superspy code named N... or is it M? Tommy must travel to Cromer, disguised as a birdwatcher, in order to identify which guest at the Sans Souci is holding the British government to ransom. Things get even more complicated when it turns out that Tuppence, dismayed at being left out, has beaten him to it and has already ingratiated herself with the other guests. But Tommy and Tuppence must learn to work together again if they are going to identify the Soviet spy, save the missing scientist and discover the location of the missing bomb before half of Norfolk is obliterated.
5	"N or M? – Part 2"	Edward Hall	Claire Wilson	23 August 2015	5.02
Tommy and Tuppence turn their attention to their fellow occupants of the Sans Souci to find the potential nuclear-bomb thief. Tommy has his eyes on Carl Denim, a shifty young beatnik who loves to flirt (especially with Tuppence) and is spending a lot of unexplained time around the coast, whereas Tuppence is convinced the culprit is Mrs. Sprot, a glamorous and sensual woman, apparently married, but travelling alone. Sprot was certainly in Khan’s room, but was it to cover up their affair or the fact she is N? There are so many potential suspects and dead ends that Tommy and Tuppence can’t help but get their wires crossed and let their guard down... and it’s Tommy who inadvertently ends up in the lion’s den.
6	"N or M? – Part 3"	Edward Hall	Claire Wilson	30 August 2015	4.46
It turns out that Gilbert managed to hide a vital key to his device before his capture, and that without it the bomb N has stolen is useless. When N gains possession of the key, Tommy and Tuppence find themselves once again backed into a corner. With Carter's help they must come up with their most ambitious and risky plan to save the lives of thousands of innocent British citizens.

== Broadcast ==
The series aired on the BBC in the UK in 2015, and was co-produced by and released on Acorn TV in the US as an original series. In 2020, Ovation acquired the US TV broadcast rights to the series, and it premiered in June 2020. It aired all six episodes until July 12, 2020.

== Critical reception ==
For Ellen E Jones, writing in UK newspaper The Independent on Sunday, "Part of the enjoyable comfort of Christie on TV is the period detail and the BBC has pulled this off with much more visual flair than ITV ever managed". Jones found Walliams and Raine to be, "as well turned out as Cary Grant and Eva Marie Saint, or James Stewart and Kim Novak; it's only a shame their interactions don't fizz with the same sexual chemistry”, but added, “At least the two leads are individually endearing”. She also noted “a promising cast of support characters".

In The Daily Telegraph, Michael Hogan mocked the second episode's plot, writing: "Locks were picked, typewriters were thrown through windows and a narrow escape was made down a drainpipe. This was Scooby Doo stuff. The Russian assassin would've got away with it if it wasn't for those pesky Brits". But he also found that, "Walliams's performance was less muted than in last week's opener, when he played it too straight and ended up being thoroughly outshone by Raine. Here they were on more of an equal footing", and concluded: "This might be featherlight fare but sometimes handsomely produced historical fun is just the ticket for a Sunday night – see also Downton Abbey. Partners in Crime's impressive ratings (6.5 million last week) suggest it will tide plenty of us over until Downton's return this autumn. Jolly good show".

The Irish Independent's Pat Stacey was much less impressed, saying, "When the hero and heroine of your mystery drama are a posh 1950s married couple called Tommy and Tuppence Beresford, you're probably half-hobbled already. When Tommy is played by David Walliams, you might as well invest in a pair of crutches. Jessica Raine is fine as the crime fiction-addicted Tuppence […] but Walliams is grossly miscast. You never for a second believe these two could be married with a young son. Required to handle a straightish dramatic role, Walliams underplays it to the point of passivity half of the time. When he's not doing that, he veers too far in the other direction, making Tommy the kind of faintly dim, ham-fisted ditherer that couldn't investigate his way through his own front door". Overall, Stacey, found: "It doesn't do to scrutinise the plot's improbable leaps and bounds. Like Hitchcock's The Lady Vanishes and The 39 Steps, both of which it superficially resembles, Partners in Crime is supposed to be a rattling, old-style good yarn. The problem is that it creaks more than it rattles, lumbering ponderously from one laboured scene to another".

== See also ==
- And Then There Were None
- Agatha Christie's Partners in Crime, 1983 series
