= James Warwick (actor) =

English actor and director (born 1947)

- Born: 17 November 1947 (age 78); Broxbourne, Hertfordshire, England
- Occupations: Actor, stage director
- Years active: 1971–present

James Warwick (born 17 November, 1947) is an English actor and theatre director. He is best known for his roles on television and his theatre work in London's West End and New York's Broadway.

== Early life ==
Warwick was born in Broxbourne, Hertfordshire, England on 17 November, 1947.

== Career ==
=== Television ===
Warwick has had leading roles in UK television including the detective series The Terracotta Horse (1973) and the BBC science fiction horror serial The Nightmare Man (1981) (co-starring with Celia Imrie). This was followed by a major guest role in the Doctor Who serial Earthshock (1982) as Lieutenant Scott. His other notable credits include Jason King, The Onedin Line, Lillie (with Francesca Annis), Rock Follies, Tales of the Unexpected, Howards' Way, Bergerac, and Iris Murdoch's The Bell with Ian Holm.

Warwick appeared in several adaptations of the works of Agatha Christie including Why Didn't They Ask Evans? (1978) (alongside Francesca Annis), The Seven Dials Mystery (1981), Partners in Crime (1983) (alongside Francesca Annis as the sleuthing couple Tommy and Tuppence) and The Secret Adversary (1983) (also with Annis).

Warwick has also worked in American television, with guest starring roles in Scarecrow and Mrs. King, Civil Wars, Home Improvement, Murder, She Wrote, Babylon 5 and Alias amongst many others.

=== Theatre ===
Warwick's starring theatre roles included An Ideal Husband on Broadway, and King Arthur in the US national tour of Camelot. He played Brad in The Rocky Horror Show on stage in London for the first year of its run in addition to many leading roles in the West End and in regional theatres across the UK and America.

Warwick is a theatre director with credits from major theaters across the US. He served as associate director at the Chester Theatre Company, and directed many productions for them over the last twelve years. He was Interim President of The American Academy of Dramatic Arts, Los Angeles campus 2007/8 and directed productions for their Company series. In 2009, Warwick was appointed President of Theatre of Arts in Hollywood, California.

Warwick later returned to his freelance theatre directing career with productions of The Government Inspector and Almost, Maine for Bard College at Simon's Rock, and Halcyon Days and Folk for Chester Theatre Company. He also records for Audible and Alison Larkin Presents... series, including The Mysterious Affair at Styles and a two-person recording of The Importance of Being Earnest. He was awarded An Audible Earphones award for his recording of The Picture of Dorian Gray. In 2018, Warwick directed 'Mothers and Sons' for Shakespeare and Co. in Lenox MA for which he was awarded 'outstanding theatre director' of the year award from The Berkshire Theatre Critics Association. His next production at Shakespeare and Co. was The Children by Lucy Kirkwood, followed by Lee Blessing's A Walk in the Woods and A Body of Water.

Other productions include Big Big Sky for Chester Theatre Co. and Eugene O'Neill's A Moon for the Misbegotten and the musical Once for The Majestic Theater in West Springfield.

=== Other work ===
Warwick voiced Armond Braddock in the 1999 video game Battlezone II: Combat Commander. He has also voiced Qui-Gon Jinn in many Star Wars video games, serving as a voice double for Liam Neeson. Warwick voiced Century in the first season of the animated series Iron Man; in the second season, he was replaced in the role by Jim Cummings and Tom Kane.
