= Josh Dylan =

British actor (born 1994)

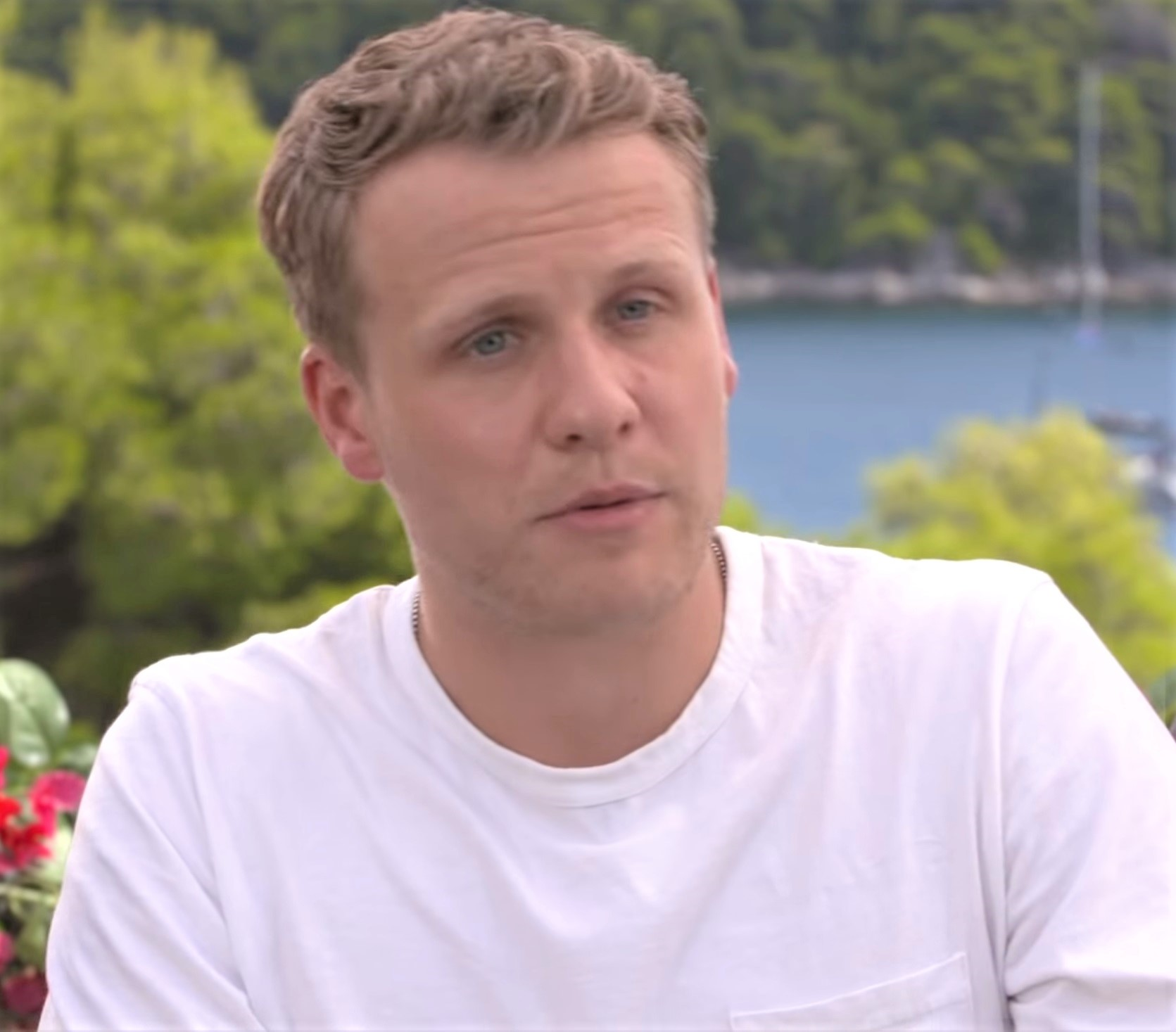
- Dylan interviewed by MTV in 2018
- Born: Joshua Dylan; 19 January 1994 (age 32); London, England
- Education: Guildhall School of Music and Drama
- Occupation: Actor
- Years active: 2016–present

Joshua Dylan (born 19 January 1994) is a British actor. He is best known for his role as Captain Adam Hunter in Allied (2016), as well as Young Bill in Mamma Mia! Here We Go Again (2018).

== Career ==
Josh Dylan trained at the Guildhall School of Music and Drama in London. In 2017, Dylan starred in the Orange Tree Theatre's production of Sheppey, directed by Paul Miller and received the 2017 Offie for Best Supporting Actor.

In 2025, he was announced to star in the series Agatha Christie's Tommy and Tuppence opposite Antonia Thomas and Imelda Staunton.

== Filmography ==
=== Film ===
| Year | Title | Role | Ref. |
|---|---|---|---|
| 2016 | Allied | Captain Adam Hunter | |
| 2018 | Mamma Mia! Here We Go Again | Young Bill Anderson | |
| 2018 | The Little Stranger | Bland | |
| 2025 | H Is for Hawk | James | |

=== Television ===
| Year | Title | Role | Ref. |
|---|---|---|---|
| 2019 | The End of the F***ing World | Todd Alan King | |
| 2020–2022 | Noughts and Crosses | Jude McGregor | |
| 2023–2025 | The Buccaneers | Lord Richard Marable | |
| 2024 | Masters of the Air | Lt. George Niethammer | |
| 2026 | Agatha Christie's Tommy & Tuppence | Tommy | |

== Stage ==
| Year | Title | Role | Theatre | Ref. |
|---|---|---|---|---|
| 2017 | Sheppey | Ernie | Orange Tree Theatre | |
| 2026 | Who's Afraid of Virginia Woolf? | Nick | Soho Place | |

== Awards and nominations ==
| Year | Award | Category | Work | Result | Ref. |
|---|---|---|---|---|---|
| 2017 | Offie | Best Supporting Actor | Sheppey | Won | |
