= By the Pricking of My Thumbs (film) =

2005 French comedy mystery film

- French: Mon petit doigt m'a dit...
- Directed by: Pascal Thomas
- Written by: François Caviglioli; Nathalie Lafaurie; Pascal Thomas
- Based on: Mon petit doigt m'a dit... by Agatha Christie
- Produced by: Alain Cadier; Pascal Thomas
- Starring: Catherine Frot; André Dussollier
- Cinematography: Renan Pollès
- Edited by: Catherine Dubeau
- Music by: Reinhardt Wagner
- Distributed by: UGC
- Release date: 13 April 2005
- Running time: 105 minutes
- Country: France
- Languages: French; English
- Budget: $6 million
- Box office: $9.2 million

By the Pricking of My Thumbs (French: Mon petit doigt m'a dit...) is a 2005 French comedy mystery film based on the 1968 novel By the Pricking of My Thumbs by Agatha Christie. It was directed by Pascal Thomas and stars Catherine Frot and André Dussollier.

== Cast ==
- Catherine Frot as Prudence Beresford
- André Dussollier as Bélisaire Beresford
- Geneviève Bujold as Rose Evangelista
- Laurent Terzieff as Sévigné
- Valérie Kaprisky as Miss Blayes
- Anne Le Ny as Alice Perry
- Bernard Verley as The General
- Alexandra Stewart as Madame Boscovan
- Sarah Biasini as Marie-Christine
- François Bettens as Rudi
