= Arthur Cox (actor) =

English actor (1934–2021)

- Born: 7 April 1934; Banbridge, County Down, Northern Ireland
- Died: 9 April 2021 (aged 87); Hillingdon, London, England
- Occupation: Actor
- Notable work: Doctor Who (1968, 2010)

Arthur Cox (7 April 1934 – 9 April 2021) was a character actor from Northern Ireland, who appeared in a number of roles in television and on stage during a career which spanned from the mid-1950s to 2020.

== Life and career ==
Cox was born in Banbridge, County Down, Northern Ireland, in April 1934. He made his theatrical debut in Belfast during the mid-1950s, appearing in a production of A View from the Bridge by Arthur Miller. His first appearance on stage in Dublin was as Ordulto in the play, The Masquerade of Henry IV in 1955.

=== Television ===
Cox played Cully in the 1968 Dr Who serial The Dominators. In 1978 he played Sir Jasper Addleton in the Wodehouse Playhouse episode 'The Smile that Wins'. During the 1980s, Cox's profile on television was raised after portraying Inspector Marriott in the drama Agatha Christie's Partners in Crime, as well as starring in Yes Minister as George, the driver of cabinet minister Jim Hacker.

He died on 9 April 2021, two days after turning 87.

== Partial filmography ==
- Saturday Playhouse (1958, TV Series) as Mr. Hushes
- Hereward the Wake (1965) as Pery
- Fahrenheit 451 (1966) as Male Nurse (uncredited)
- Dixon of Dock Green (1966–1968, TV Series) as First Officer / Johnson / Hall
- The Avengers (1967–1968, TV Series) as Anaesthetist / Clarke
- Doctor Who (1968, TV Series) as Cully
- ITV Playhouse (1968–1978, TV Series) as Sergeant / Cousin / Mr. Baker
- Sweeney 2 (1978) as Detective
- Yes Minister (1980–1981, TV Series) as George
- Agatha Christie's Partners in Crime (1983–1984, TV Series) as Inspector Marriott
- Give My Regards to Broad Street (1984) as BBC Engineer
- Castaway (1986) as Inland Revenue manager (uncredited)
- God's Outlaw (1986) as Peter Quentel
- The Bill (1986–1993, TV Series) as Off-License Manager / Simpkins
- Personal Services (1987) as Lennox
- Aria (1987) as Major (segment "Un ballo in maschera")
- Hope and Glory (1987) as Fireman
- Little Dorrit (1987) as Stage Carpenter
- The Zero Option (1988) as Sid
- She-Wolf of London (1990–1991, TV Series) as Dad Matheson
- Shuttlecock (1991) as Fizz / Fox
- Agatha Christie's Poirot (1993, TV Series) as Dr. Hawker
- Lovejoy (1993, TV Series) as Peter Stroud
- Coronation Street (1994, TV Series) as Mr. Tonks
- The Young Poisoner's Handbook (1995) as Ray
- Girl from Rio (2001) as Bank Customer
- Christmas Carol: The Movie (2001) as Dr. Lambert (voice)
- To Kill a King (2003) as Westminster Abbey priest
- Jane Eyre (2006, TV Mini-Series) as Colonel Dent
- Doctor Who (2010, TV Series) as Mr. Henderson
- Shuttlecock (2020) as Fizz
