= Jessica Raine =

British actress (born 1981/82)

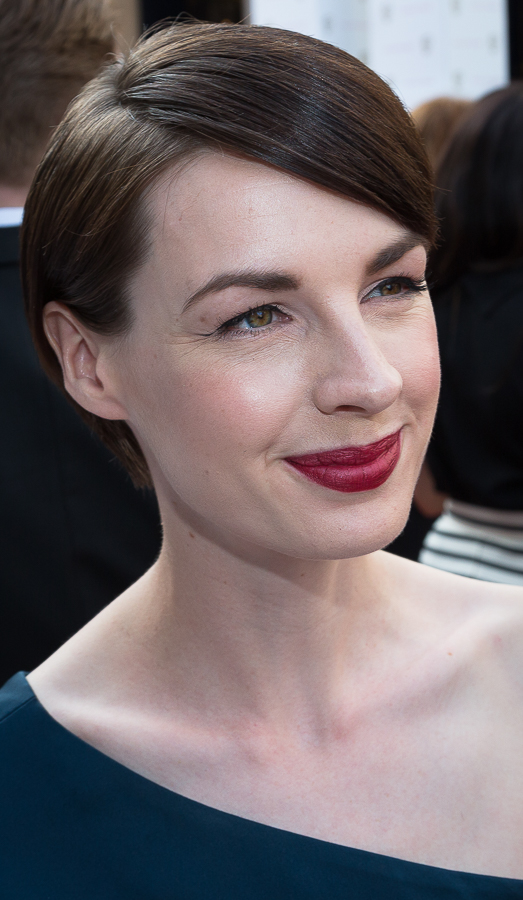
- Raine at the 2015 British Academy Television Awards
- Born: Jessica Lloyd; May 14, 1982 (age 44); Eardisley, Herefordshire, England
- Occupation: Actress
- Years active: 2008–present
- Spouse: Tom Goodman-Hill (m. 2015)
- Children: 1

Jessica Raine (born Jessica Lloyd; May 14, 1982) is an English actress. She rose to prominence as Nurse Jennifer Lee in Call the Midwife (2012–2014) and in 2013 played Verity Lambert in An Adventure in Space and Time. Raine portrayed Jane Rochford in the 2015 TV series Wolf Hall, and Catherine Parr in Becoming Elizabeth in 2022, and has played the lead role in The Devil's Hour since 2022. She has also had roles in stage and radio plays.

== Early life and education ==
Raine was born Jessica Lloyd in 1981 or 1982 in Eardisley, Herefordshire, where she was raised on a farm. She is the younger of two daughters of farmer Allan Lloyd (descended from the Lloyd family of Baynham Hall, who were well known for generations as bonesetters alongside their farming activities), and his wife Sue.

Raine was educated in Kington, Herefordshire, and wanted to be an actress from the age of 13, as her father starred in amateur dramatics with the Eardisley Little Theatre. In sixth form she studied theatre at A-Level, and a BTEC in photography at Hereford College of Arts.

Raine studied drama and cultural studies at the University of the West of England, Bristol. After graduating, she was turned down by every drama school she applied to, so went to Thailand and taught English as a second language.

== Career ==
=== Theatre ===
Returning home after a year, she applied to the Royal Academy of Dramatic Art a second time and was accepted. Moving to London in anticipation of starting her course, she worked part-time as a waitress and for BT Group.

After graduating in 2008, Raine began a successful stage career, initially cast as Lesley Sharp's goth daughter in Simon Stephens's Harper Regan. She played Tamsin Greig's 16-year-old daughter in David Hare's Gethsemane.

Raine played at the National Theatre in Mike Bartlett's Earthquakes in London as teenage wild-child Jasmine; and then as a secretary in the revival of Clifford Odets's Rocket to the Moon. She also appeared in Ghosts and Punk Rock, for which she won the Manchester Evening News Award for Best Supporting Actress.

She played a role in the Young Vic's revival of The Changeling. In 2012 Raine starred in Beyond Ballets Russes at the London Coliseum.

=== Screen ===
Raine's first screen credits were an appearance in a 2009 episode of Garrow's Law and a small role in the 2010 film Robin Hood.

She starred as the lead character Jenny Lee in the first three series of the BBC One drama Call the Midwife. On 9 March 2014, it was announced that Raine was leaving the show at the end of series three to pursue a film career in the United States.

Raine was a guest star in the 2013 Doctor Who episode "Hide". Later that year, she appeared as Doctor Who's original producer, Verity Lambert, in the fact-based drama An Adventure in Space and Time, showing the creation of the series as part of its 50th anniversary celebrations.

In February 2014, Raine joined the cast of the BBC Two police drama Line of Duty for series two as Detective Constable Georgia Trotman, working for the AC12 anti-corruption unit.

In January 2015, Raine played Jane Rochford in Wolf Hall. In July 2015, Raine played Tuppence Beresford in the series Partners in Crime based on Agatha Christie's Tommy and Tuppence stories, though the series is set in 1952 rather than the 1920s.

In 2017, Raine played Alison Laithwaite in The Last Post, which she has described as her "favourite character I've played so far, ever. It was a real transformation. She's kind of self-destructive, witty and she's climbing the walls with frustration and boredom, but she just wants to have fun."

In 2019, Raine played Genevieve Taylor, a British liaison officer for Europol in the Netherlands, in the BBC One drama series Baptiste.

Since 2022 she has played the lead role in the British TV thriller series The Devil's Hour, opposite Peter Capaldi.

In 2026, Raine played the lead role in Two Weeks in August, a British drama series created by Catherine Shepherd. The Guardian gave the series a five star review, saying that Raine, who played Zoe, delivered "an extraordinary performance".

=== Radio ===
On radio, she has played Felice in the Murray Gold play Kafka the Musical, broadcast in April 2011 on BBC Radio 3. She also played the part of Kasey in Ed Harris' radio play The Wall, broadcast in February 2011 on BBC Radio 3.

== Personal life ==
Raine began a relationship with fellow actor Tom Goodman-Hill sometime after they met while appearing in the 2010 production of the play Earthquakes in London. After Goodman-Hill's divorce, they married on 30 August 2015. The couple have a child together, born in February 2019.

== Filmography ==
=== Film ===
Year	Title	Role	Notes
2010	Robin Hood	Princess Isabel of Gloucester	
2011	Elsewhere	Cath	Short film
2012	The Woman in Black	Joseph's nanny	
2018	Benjamin	Billie	
2019	Black Shore	Holly	Short film
2019	Carmilla	Miss Fontaine	

=== Television ===
Year	Title	Role	Notes
2009	Garrow's Law	Ann Porter	Episode: #1.2
2012–2014	Call the Midwife	Jennifer Lee	Main cast (series 1–3)
2013	Doctor Who	Emma Grayling	Episode: "Hide"
2013	An Adventure in Space and Time	Verity Lambert	Television film
2014	Line of Duty	DC Georgia Trotman	Episode: "The Ambush"
2015	Wolf Hall	Jane Rochford	Main cast
2015	Fortitude	Jules Sutter	Main cast (series 1)
2015	Partners in Crime	Tuppence Beresford	Main cast
2016	Jericho	Annie Quaintain	Main cast
2016	Inside No. 9	Kathy	Episode: "The Devil of Christmas"
2017	The Last Post	Alison Laithwaite	Main cast
2018	Patrick Melrose	Julia	Miniseries; main cast
2018	Informer	Emily Waters	Main cast
2019	Baptiste	Genevieve Taylor	Main cast (series 1)
2022	Becoming Elizabeth	Catherine Parr	Main cast
2022–present	The Devil's Hour	Lucy Chambers	Main cast
2026	Two Weeks in August	Zoe	Main cast

=== Radio ===
Year	Title	Role	Radio station
2009	The Girl at the Lion d'Or	Anne Louvert	BBC Radio 4
2010	Sarah and Ken	Lorna	BBC Radio 3
2010–2011	I, Claudius	Messalina	BBC Radio 4
2011	The Wall	Kasey	BBC Radio 3
2011	Kafka the Musical	Felice Bauer	BBC Radio 3
2011	Life and Fate	Zina	BBC Radio 4
2011	The High Window	Merle Davis	BBC Radio 4
2012	Ethan Frome	Mattie	BBC Radio 4 Extra
2013	Jill	Elizabeth Dowling	BBC Radio 4
2014	Do Androids Dream of Electric Sheep?	Rachael Rosen	BBC Radio 4
2016	The Muse	Narrator	BBC Radio 4 Extra
2016–2017	The Forsyte Saga	Fleur Mont	BBC Radio 4
2018	Vampirella	The Countess	BBC Radio 3
2019	The Pallisers	Lady Glencora Palliser	BBC Radio 4
2020	Endell Street	Narrator	BBC Radio 4

=== Stage ===
Year	Title	Role	Venue
2008	Harper Regan	Sarah Regan	National Theatre
2008–2009	Gethsemane	Suzette Guest	National Theatre
2009	Punk Rock	Lily Cahill	Royal Exchange / Lyric Hammersmith
2010	Ghosts	Regine	Duchess Theatre
2010	Earthquakes in London	Jasmine	National Theatre
2011	Rocket to the Moon	Cleo Singer	National Theatre
2012	The Changeling	Beatrice-Joanna	Young Vic
2013	Roots	Beatie	Donmar Warehouse
2016	X	Gilda	Royal Court Theatre
2020	Bubble	Morgan	Nottingham Playhouse

== Awards and nominations ==
Year	Award	Category	Nominated work	Result	Ref.
2009	Manchester Evening News Theatre Awards	Best Supporting Actress	Punk Rock	Won	
2010	Ian Charleson Awards	Best Performance in a Play	Ghosts	Nominated	
2012	South Bank Sky Arts Award	The Times Breakthrough Award: TV Drama	Call the Midwife	Nominated	
2014	Critics' Choice Television Awards	Best Supporting Actress in a Movie/Miniseries	An Adventure in Space and Time	Nominated	
