= Matthew Steer =

English actor and writer

- Born: 24 April 1978 (age 48); Hitchin, Hertfordshire, England
- Occupations: Actor, Writer
- Years active: 1989–present

Matthew Steer (born 24 April 1978) is an English actor and writer.

He made his stage debut in 1989 and is known for his roles as Ricky Ryan in Silent Witness, Matt Lindsay in EastEnders, Dr. Potts in Showtrial, and Albert Pemberton in Partners in Crime.

== Filmography ==
Year	Title	Role	Notes
1993	Spies	Ned Carter	Television film
1993	An Exchange of Fire	Jeremy	
1994	Mud	Simon	6 Episodes
1996	Black Hearts in Battersea	Justin	5 episodes
1996	Silent Witness	Ricky Ryan	8 Episodes
1996-2007	The Bill	Tim York/Porter/Dave Shaw	4 episodes
1998	Basil	Young Ralph	
2002	EastEnders	Matt Lindsay	9 Episodes
2004	One Man Spacecraft	Mat	Short film
2008	Britain's Best Mates	Phill	10 episodes
2008-2015	Casualty	Mortuary Attendent/Sam Jones	2 Episodes
2008	Summerhill	Reporter	Television film
2009	The Royal	Paul Harman	Episode: "These Foolish Things"
2009	Doctors	Phill	Episode: "Chef's Secret"
2010	Schizofredric	Reporter	Short film
2010	Big Babies	Private Popper	13 episodes
2010	Harry Potter and the Deathly Hallows – Part 1	Young Wizard	Uncredited
2011	Misfits	James	Series 3, Episode 8
2012	Proto	Simon	Short film
2013	The Café	Stripper	Episode: "Stags or Hens"
2014	Utopia	Adam	Series 2, Episode 2, uncredited
2016	Leatherbird	Gill	
2014-2016	Siblings	Kevin	3 episodes
2014	Outlander	Lt. Hughes	Episode: "The Garrison Commander"
2014	ABCs of Death 2	Sound Man	Segment: "B"
2014-2017	Crackanory	Various	5 episodes
2015-2017	Drunk History	Various	10 episodes
2015	Cinderella	Halberdier	
2015	Partners in Crime	Albert	6 episodes
2015	New Tricks	Alan Power	Episode: "Prodigal Sons"
2015	Urban Hymn	Michael	
2015	Cider with Rosie	Vicar	Television film
2015	SuperBob	Joe	
2015	National Theatre Live: Hamlet	Rosencrantz	
2015	On Stage: Live from Television Centre	Leon	Television film
2016	Criminal	Library Patron	
2016	Morgana Robinson's The Agency	Businessman	Episode 4
2016	Drifters	Paul	Episode: "Big Break"
2017	Count Arthur Strong	Dr. Frome	Episode: "Untrue Detective"
2018	Black Earth Rising	Charles Barrett	Episode: "Looking at the Past"
2018	Informer	Howard Cook	"The Masterplan"
2018	The Last Kingdom	Tortured Monk	1 episode
2018	The Queen and I	Ian Livingstone-Chalk	television film
2018	Les Misérables	Blachevelle	Episode 1
2019	Black Shore	Ben	Short film
2019	Wild Bill	Max	Episode: "Piano Man"
2019	The Crown	Wilson's Aide	2 episodes
2019	After Ever After	Herald	Television film
2020	The Duke	Passing BBC Manager	
2020	Say Your Prayers	Martin Silver	
2020	Urban Myths	Mike Jefferey	Episode: "Hendrix & Handel"
2020	Brothers	Policeman	Short film
2021	Leonardo	Sforza Chamberlain	2 episodes
2022	The Ipcress File	Professor Dawson	6 Episodes
2022	Nobody Listens Anymore	Max	Short film
2022	Becoming Elizabeth	William	Episode: "Keep Your Knife Bright"
2022	Dangerous Liaisons	Emile the Map Maker	2 episodes
2023	You	Butler	Episode: "Hampsie"
2023	Jerk	Nicholas	Series 3, Episode 6
2024	Miss Scarlet and the Duke	Daniel Archer	Episode: "The Calling"
2024	Last Swim	Professor Walters	
2024	Shardlake	Doctor Goodhap	3 episodes
2024	Wyatt Earp and the Cowboy War	Thomas Fitch	5 episodes
2024	Showtrial	Dr. Potts	Episode: "The Smaller Picture"
2025	How Are You? It's Alan (Partridge)	Robin	Episode 4
2025	Talamasca: The Secret Order	Loren	4 episodes
