= Partners in Crime (short story collection) =

1929 collection by Agatha Christie

- First US edition
- Author: Agatha Christie
- Cover artist: Not known
- Language: English
- Genre: Detective fiction Short stories
- Publisher: Dodd, Mead (US); Collins (UK)
- Publication date: 1929
- Publication place: United States
- Media type: Print (hardback & paperback)
- Pages: 277 (first edition, hardcover)
- Preceded by: The Seven Dials Mystery
- Followed by: The Mysterious Mr Quin

Partners in Crime is a short story collection by British writer Agatha Christie, first published by Dodd, Mead and Company in the US in 1929 and in the UK by William Collins, Sons on 16 September of the same year. The US edition retailed at $2.00 and the UK edition at seven shillings and sixpence (7/6). All of the stories in the collection had previously been published in magazines (see First publication of stories below) and feature her detectives Tommy and Tuppence Beresford, first introduced in The Secret Adversary (1922).

This collection of detective short stories has a theme connecting the stories, as well, "a group of short detective stories within a detective novel."

The collection was well received on publication, with the "merriest collection", with amiable parodies, to one reviewer who was less impressed, saying the stories were "entertaining enough". One noted that "By having two detectives who are usually alternately successful she [Christie] has always a foil, less obtuse than 'my dear Watson'. "Her literary skill is equal to the task" of parodies of the style of well-known detective writers. Some of the authors parodied in the 1920s are long-forgotten, yet a review in 1990 commented that "the parodies are not sharp enough for this to matter very much" to prevent enjoyment of the stories. It also noted that the plot of one story, "The House of Lurking Death", "anticipates" a detective novel published in 1930 by Dorothy Sayers.

== Plot introduction ==
The Beresfords' old friend Mr Carter, from a government intelligence agency, arrives bearing a proposition for the adventurous duo. They are to take over 'the International Detective Agency', a recently cleaned-out spy stronghold, and pose as the owners so as to intercept any enemy messages coming through. In the meantime Tommy and Tuppence can take on cases as this detective agency, an opportunity that delights the young couple. They employ Albert, a young man also introduced in The Secret Adversary, as their assistant at the agency.

The two tackle a series of cases – mimicking in each the style of a famous fictional detective of the period, including Dr. Thorndyke; Sherlock Holmes; the brothers Okewood, Desmond and Francis, by Valentine Williams; Isabel Ostrander's characters, ex-Roundsman Tim McCarty and his friend Dennis Riordan; Clinton H. Stagg's fictional blind sleuth Thornley Colton, known as the Problemist; the work of Edgar Wallace; and Christie's own Hercule Poirot. At the end of the book, Tuppence reveals that she is pregnant, and will play a diminished role in the spy business.

== Plot summaries ==
=== A Fairy in the Flat ===
Prudence ("Tuppence") Beresford, who is happily married to Tommy for six years, is bored with life. She flippantly discusses what exciting things she would wish to happen to her. Their conversation is interrupted by the arrival of Mr Carter (see The Secret Adversary) who asks them to take over The International Detective Agency. The agency's manager, Theodore Blunt, is in prison. Carter's particular request is that they watch for letters on blue paper sent to Mr Blunt from a purported ham merchant anxious to trace his refugee wife. Each such letter will have a Russian stamp with a "16" written underneath. He asks for such letters to be sent to him immediately.

=== A Pot of Tea ===
Tommy's alias is Mr Blunt, while Tuppence is his confidential secretary, Miss Robinson. The porter from their flat, "a Long Island butler", Albert is their "office boy".

"You see, Tuppence, I can't help feeling that we are more or less amateurs at this business-of course amateurs in one sense we cannot help being, but it would do no harm to acquire the technique, so to speak. These books are detective stories by the leading masters of the art. I intend to try different styles, and compare results." - Tommy

After a week of refusing divorce cases, which Tuppence finds distasteful, they receive a visit from Lawrence St Vincent. He is the nephew of, and heir to, the Earl of Cheriton. He has fallen for a young woman called Janet who works in a hat shop in Brooks Street. She has disappeared from the shop and has not been seen at her lodgings. St Vincent wants them to find her. The Beresfords take on the case, which Tuppence solves with ease. Janet is a friend of hers from her wartime nursing days who was working at the shop where Tuppence makes her purchases. She asked Janet to mention the "Blunts" and then disappear. St Vincent would ask them to take on the case, for which they receive favourable publicity, and when they find Janet, her happiness will provoke St Vincent into a proposal of marriage to Janet.

=== The Affair of the Pink Pearl ===
Tommy sorts out a pile of famous detective stories, and he thinks it would be a good idea to base their techniques on the styles of their fictional counterparts. He has bought a good camera for taking photographs of footprints and "all that sort of thing". The next client is a young woman named Miss Kingston Bruce. She lives in Wimbledon with her parents, and last night one of their guests lost a valuable pink pearl. The Blunts have been recommended to them by Lawrence St Vincent, who was one of the guests.

The Beresfords travel to Wimbledon and meet Colonel Kingston Bruce. He proudly tells them that Lady Laura Barton, daughter of the late Earl of Carroway, is staying with them together with an American couple, Mr and Mrs Hamilton Betts, who wanted to meet a titled lady. During a bridge game after dinner, the clasp of Mrs Betts' pearl pendant necklace broke. She laid it down on a small table and forgot to take it upstairs. The next morning, the necklace was still there but the pearl itself had gone. Aside from the Kingston Bruces, the Betts, Lady Laura, and St Vincent, the only other guest was Mr Rennie, paying court to Miss Kingston Bruce. Her father does not like him as he is a socialist. No one has been allowed to leave the house since the pearl was discovered to be missing, except for the daughter when she went to the Blunts. They search the house as part of their investigations.

Tommy uses his new camera whilst Tuppence tactfully questions the servants. They overhear a scrap of conversation between Mrs Kingston Bruce and her daughter about someone hiding a teaspoon in their muff. Later on, Tuppence ferrets out of Lady Laura's French maid, Elise, that her employer is something of a kleptomaniac, and five times in the past items have gone missing when she has been staying at friends' houses. They search Lady Laura's bedroom and bathroom, momentarily getting stuck in the latter room when Elise cannot open the door. Tommy takes pictures in the bedroom with Elise's assistance and then quietly tells Tuppence that he has an idea and has to go out to pursue it. In the meantime, she is not to let Lady Laura out of the house.

Tommy returns with Inspector Marriot of Scotland Yard. They go straight back to the bathroom and cut the cake of soap in half. Inside it is the pearl. The reason Elise could not open the door was that she had soap on her hands after depositing the pearl there. Tommy's photographs included one of the maid and she handled one of the glass slides, leaving her fingerprints. Scotland Yard has identified her from their records as a missing criminal and arrested her. Being the maid of a lady suspected of kleptomania was the best cover she could have had.

=== The Adventure of the Sinister Stranger ===
Tuppence receives a package with an engraved silver cigarette case, which she had bought for General Francis Haviland whom she drove in the First World War. It is her wedding gift to him. Tommy's disparaging remarks about the General are interrupted by the arrival of the post and the first of the expected blue Russian letters. Their perusal of the letter is interrupted by the arrival of a large man with a club foot who states that he is Dr Charles Bower of Hampstead. Twice in the last week he has been summoned away to an urgent case but on each occasion the call has been a hoax. On arriving back home, he has found signs that his study has been carefully searched in his absence, probably for papers relating to his studies of alkaloids, these papers being securely held in a secret drawer in his desk. He has now received another summons, this time to a patient in Bournemouth, but in checking on this summons he has found it to be another decoy. Bower therefore expects that another search of his study will be made tonight, and wants Blunt to be there when the third attempt is made.

Bower leaves, and his club foot reminds Tuppence of the brothers Okewood. Tommy resolves to be Desmond while she is Francis. Their next visitor is Detective Inspector Dymchurch from Scotland Yard, a colleague of Marriot, who understands the need to keep a watch on the blue letters and is following Bower. The doctor's real purpose is to decoy the Beresfords away from their office that night in order that it can be searched and the latest letter retrieved. Tommy and Dymchurch make another plan to return to the office that night and catch the agents in the act. They do so but it is a trap, and Tommy is bound. Dymchurch is a foreign agent accompanied by several of his men. Bower (real spelling, Bauer) is one of his gang. He threatens Tommy with torture to reveal the whereabouts of the blue letter. Tommy tells them that Tuppence has it, and writes a letter summoning her to the office; but he signs this "Francis" and shows them the General's wedding present as proof that this is his real name and not "Theodore Blunt". Tuppence arrives and alerted by the false name in the note, she has brought Inspector Marriot with her and several armed policemen. "Dymchurch" and his co-conspirators are arrested.

=== Finessing the King/The Gentleman Dressed in Newspaper ===
While reading the 'Daily Leader' newspaper, Tuppence decides that she wants to go dancing. A reluctant Tommy tries to distract her attention by pointing out to her the interesting fact that dots in the masthead of the newspaper indicate the different days on which the paper was produced, while his wife spots an advert in the personal column which reads, "I should go three hearts. 12 tricks. Ace of Spades. Necessary to finesse the King." She deduces that this refers to the Three Arts Ball the next evening, "12 tricks" means twelve o'clock midnight and the "Ace of Spades" refers to a somewhat decadent nightclub-cum-eating place in Chelsea where it is fashionable to go to after events like the Three Arts Ball. Curious about "Necessary to finesse the King" and feeling that they need to hone their detective skills, she decides that she and Tommy will go the ball in costume to investigate. They will act as the detectives Tommy McCarty and Dennis Riordan.

At the Ace of Spades, the Beresfords sit in a private booth and peer through the door at the various other costumed and masked patrons. The booth next door is soon taken by a woman dressed as Alice's Queen of Hearts and a man outfitted as the gentleman dressed in newspaper. After a while, they hear a cry from the woman followed by the man laughing and then see him leaving. After a few minutes, suspicious, Tuppence makes Tommy follow her into the booth and they find the woman stabbed through the heart. She whispers, "Bingo did it", before she dies. The next day, Inspector Marriot brings Sir Arthur Merivale, the husband of the dead woman, Lady Vere Merivale, round to the Beresford's flat. "Bingo" Hale is known to both of them and he is stunned that his best friend could have killed his wife. Hale had been staying with them and was arrested that morning for murder. Merivale is perplexed as to what the motive could have been and is incensed at the suggestion from Marriot that the two were lovers and that Vere was threatening Hale who was paying attention to a rich American woman. Tuppence shows Sir Arthur the advert from the Daily Leader and the way the two communicated with each other using this device. Before she died, Vere tore off a piece of Bingo's newspaper costume and the police intend to match this up with the discarded costume.

Marriot returns to the Beresford's with photographs of the fragment and the section of the costume it came from; he has the last link to convict Hale but Tuppence senses that he is far from satisfied with this conclusion to the case. After he leaves, she notices that the dots in the masthead of the two pieces do not match. They invite Sir Arthur back round and confront him with the evidence. Tuppence puts it to him that he too was at the Ace of Spades, dressed in a nearly identical masked costume. Hale says that he was slipped a note asking him not to approach Vere and he complied. Sir Arthur took his place and killed his own wife. The man laughs at this suggestion and Tuppence recognises it as the same laugh she heard from the booth. Marriot is hidden in their flat listening in, but Sir Arthur Merivale throws himself from a window and falls to his death before he can be taken. Marriot tells them that the motive was not jealousy but money. Vere Merivale was the one in the marriage with the money, and if she had left her husband he would have been destitute.

=== The Case of the Missing Lady ===
The International Detective Agency receives a visit from Gabriel Stavansson, the famous explorer, who has returned early from a two-year expedition to the North Pole. Tommy and Tuppence impress him with their initial display of observational and deductive powers (because they read of his return in the Daily Mirror earlier that day) and he entrusts his case to them.

Stavansson explains that before he went on the expedition, he became engaged to the Hon Mrs Hermione Leigh Gordon, whose first husband was killed in World War I. His first thought on returning was to rush to London and see his fiancée who had been staying with her aunt, Lady Susan Clonray, in Pont Street. Lady Susan is surprised to see him and proves evasive about her niece's whereabouts, saying that she was moving between friends in the north of the country. Stavansson and Lady Susan had never really got on well, partially due to his dislike of fat women like her, and partially due to his perception that she disapproved of the engagement. He requests the names and addresses of the various people that Hermione was supposed to visit, and travels north to see them. None had had recent contact with his fiancée.

Lady Susan seems genuinely upset when told this news, but a telegram arrived as she and Stavansson were talking, signed by Hermione and addressed from Maldon, saying she was going to Monte Carlo. Stavansson travelled to Maldon but is unable to find her, prompting his visit to Blunt's International Detective Agency.

Taking up the case, Tommy and Tuppence travel to Maldon themselves and draw a similar blank on the whereabouts of the missing woman. It is then that Tuppence realises that there are two Maldons – where they are in Surrey, and another place of the same name in Sussex. They travel there and find an isolated private nursing home near the village. Investigating this lead, Tuppence inquires at the nursing home and is told they do not have a patient named Mrs Leigh Gordon. Next, Tommy poses as a journalist seeking an interview with Dr Horriston, but he too is turned away. Next, the sleuths overhear a conversation which sends each in a different direction. Tommy leaves Tuppence to keep watch while he goes to make some phone calls in the village. Upon his return he shares the news that Dr Horriston has a reputation as "a most unscrupulous quack..."

After dark, the two return to the house. Tuppence ascends a ladder to a second floor window, where she sees a woman strapped to the bed and writhing in pain. She recognises the woman as Mrs Leigh Gordon. While Tuppence is watching, a nurse enters the room and injects the woman with an unknown substance. Tuppence informs Tommy of what she has seen and then ascends the ladder again, leaving him to keep a look out while she tries to free the woman. A few moments pass and Tommy is startled by a hand upon his shoulder, but it is Tuppence, having left by the front door of the house. She informs Tommy that the case is solved. Hermione Leigh Gordon is at the nursing home by choice for a quick weight loss program. The only problem is that Stavansson has returned early, just at the time she had started the treatments. Feeling foolish, the young detectives leave quickly, with Tommy commenting that there is no need to place the case in their records, in the fashion of Sherlock Holmes, as "It has absolutely no distinctive features."

=== Blindman's Buff ===
Tommy receives a phone call from Mr Carter warning him and Tuppence that the people connected with the Russian letters on blue paper have become aware that they have taken Blunt's place, and to expect developments any time soon. Tommy suggests Tuppence waits in the safety of their home but she refuses. Tommy suggests an exercise in following the methods of the blind detective Thornley Colton. He dons a pair of black eyeshades and practises (badly) his awareness of his surroundings by use of his other senses. Tommy decides he and Tuppence will go for lunch at the Blitz hotel so that he can practise further in the surroundings of the restaurant.

At the Blitz, they are soon joined by two men who have been observing the pair and who say that Blunt has been pointed out to them, although one of them admits he did not know Theodore Blunt was blind. They have been to the office and learned they were at lunch, and by coincidence have stopped at the same restaurant. One man introduces himself as the Duke of Blairgowrie and his friend is Captain Harker. The Duke's daughter has been kidnapped "under somewhat peculiar circumstances" which mean that he cannot call in the police, and he wants Blunt to accompany them to his house immediately. Tommy agrees, but not before he has drunk a cup of coffee and given Tuppence instructions for a meal at the hotel tomorrow, at which he will dine with the French Prefect of Police. That done, they leave with Tommy and the Duke taking a different car to that of Captain Harker and Tuppence.

It is a trap and the "Duke" is connected with the Russian letters. He prods a pistol at Tommy and takes him to a hideout where he is bound to a chair while the "Duke" gloats over him. He tells Tommy that the floor of the room they are in is metal and now electrified. He is going to make Tommy walk across the floor, even though he is blind. If he steps on a contact point, he will die. He hands him his white cane and unties him and the "game" is about to commence. Tommy coolly takes out a cigarette and match but he has anticipated the trap and instead lights a magnesium wire he is carrying. The flare blinds the "Duke" who lowers his pistol and then he finds himself at the point of Tommy's cane, which is a swordstick. Tommy reveals that his dark shades were false and he has been able to see all the time. The "Duke" springs forward with rage and steps on a contact point, dying instantly. Tommy escapes the house and rings Tuppence from a call box. She is safe. Tommy's "order" at the hotel was in fact a set of code words from Clinton H Stagg's stories for Albert to fetch help. Albert tailed Tuppence, and he and the police freed her from "Captain Harker".

=== The Man in the Mist ===
"Of course if you really think you are Sherlock Holmes, Thorndyke, McCarty and the Brothers Okewood all rolled into one there is no more to be said." -Tuppence

Tommy and Tuppence have had a setback, failing to solve their latest case involving a stolen pearl necklace. Instead, the local police inspector apprehended the culprit. Having withdrawn to lick their wounds with cocktails in a hotel, they meet an old acquaintance, Mervyn Estcourt, known as "Bulger", who is in the company of the famous actress Gilda Glen. She is renowned for her beauty and rumoured to be notable for her lack of intelligence. Miss Glen seems puzzled by Tommy's Father Brown disguise and Tommy ambiguously confirms his detective credentials. The directions from Bulger as to the way back to the station include a walk down Morgan's Avenue. Miss Glen is startled by this advice and Bulger laughs at her belief that the road in question is haunted by the ghost of a policeman who was killed and yet still walks his spectral beat. Miss Glen leaves hurriedly. Bulger tells them that she is engaged to marry Lord Leconbury, who meets the actress outside the door to the hotel. Bulger leaves soon afterwards and Tommy receives a note from Miss Glen asking for his help and for him to call on her at The White House, Morgan's Avenue, at 6.10 pm.

A shabbily dressed and aggressive young man bursts into the hotel. Sitting near Tommy and Tuppence, he tells them that his name is James Reilly, and he is a pacifist poet enamoured of Gilda. She once cared for him, but does so no longer since her engagement to Lord Leconbury. Still angry, he leaves as suddenly as he arrived. Tommy and Tuppence walk to Morgan's Avenue, in a thick fog. Tuppence is startled when a policeman looms up out of the mist just near to the White House. Recovering herself, she sees Reilly enter the house. The policeman confirms that the house is the residence of Mrs Honeycott, and that he saw someone who resembles Miss Glen enter there a few minutes before.

About to enter the house, they hear a cry and Reilly runs out, leaving what looks like red paint from his hand on a gatepost as he does so. The two enter the house and meet Ellen, the maid, who is indignant about the visit by Reilly. Then they meet Mrs Honeycott. Mistaking Tommy for a real priest, she asks for his help with Gilda who is her sister. Some twenty years before, at the age of seventeen, she married a man against the wishes of her family, and now wants a divorce to marry Lord Leconbury. Her husband is refusing to grant her this wish, although the marriage took place so long ago that Mrs Honeycott cannot remember his name. She confirms that it was Reilly whom she saw rush upstairs and as quickly down again. Tommy asks to be shown upstairs where they find Gilda's body, her head smashed in on one side by a blunt instrument. Tuppence fetches the policeman from outside. Questioning reveals that Mrs Honeycott heard her sister entering the house at eight minutes past six as she was re-setting the main clock. This agrees with the time at which the policeman himself saw the actress enter, just before Tommy and Tuppence walked up Morgan's Avenue.

The next day, Reilly is arrested and Tommy and Tuppence meet with his solicitor, Mr Marvell. Reilly insists that the woman was dead when he entered her room. That would mean either Ellen or Mrs Honeycott killed her. Tommy suddenly realises no one inside the house saw Gilda enter, they only heard the door open. Before that the two women already in the house were in the kitchen, where they could not see or hear anyone entering with a key. Just because they heard the door banging, it does not prove anything. It could just as easily have been someone leaving the house, like the policeman they saw at the gate and who carries a truncheon, which would serve as the blunt instrument needed to carry out the deed, especially as the policeman was Gilda's husband of long-ago.

=== The Crackler ===
Blunt's detective agency is doing well. Tommy considers they may need a larger office, in part to accommodate the shelf-space needed to store the classics books by Edgar Wallace if they are to copy his methods of detection. Inspector Marriot calls on the two sleuths with his mission for them: A large number of well-forged one-pound notes are in circulation and he wants them to track down the source. The West End seems to be the starting point in England, and some have come from across the Channel. The police are especially interested in the activities of Major Laidlaw who is involved in horse racing circles. He and his French wife seem to have a lot of money. Although it could be a coincidence, a large number of the notes have come from a gambling club used by the Laidlaws and this, together with the racing, could be an ideal way of distributing the forgeries. Another friend of the Laidlaws is Lawrence St Vincent (from A Pot of Tea above) and Marriot thinks he could introduce the Beresfords into the set.

Tommy and Tuppence make their plans to catch the head of the forgers, or 'The Crackler' as Tommy calls him, named after the sound that a rustled banknote makes. The two are soon ensconced in the Laidlaw's circle of friends. As well as the Laidlaws themselves, Mrs Laidlaw's French father, M. Heroulade, is an object of suspicion. They observe how notes are passed by the Laidlaws to lay their bets. Among each wad of notes there are some forgeries. Marguerite Laidlaw is a striking woman and has a string of admirers. Among them is a visiting wealthy American called Hank Ryder who tells Tommy that she is in fear of her husband. Ryder also notices the forged notes, as his bank rejected them.

The next night Tommy is at the gambling club. Mrs Laidlaw passes him small notes to exchange for one of a higher denomination. Among them are several forgeries. His suspicions are directed to M. Heroulade, but his attention is caught when he leaves the club and finds Hank Ryder drunk in the street outside. In his slurred ramblings he tells Tommy how Mrs Laidlaw took him on a treasure hunt which included a visit to Whitechapel where she "found" five hundred pounds. Tommy takes Ryder to the district and the house they visited earlier. As the row of terraced dwellings look identical, Tommy chalks a small cross at the base of the back door before they enter. Ryder thinks he hears someone coming and goes back out to investigate. Tommy goes further into the house and finds the counterfeiting gang and The Crackler himself – Hank Ryder.

Ryder captures Tommy and tells him that he marked every door with a cross. Ryder's satisfaction is cut short when Marriot and the police burst into the room and arrest the gang. Tommy tells Ryder that when he was chalking the door, he emptied a bottle of valerian on the ground, thus attracting the neighbourhood cats to the smell. This was his pre-arranged sign to Albert who, on his orders, followed them to Whitechapel.

=== The Sunningdale Mystery ===
Tommy takes Tuppence to lunch at an ABC shop where he decides to mimic the tastes and habits of "The Old Man in the Corner" with Tuppence playing the part of Polly Burton. To test his abilities as this detective, he has brought along a cutting from a newspaper on the recent case known as the Sunningdale Mystery.

Captain Anthony Sessle and Mr Hollaby, business partners and members of Sunningdale Golf Club, played a full round of golf on the course on a Wednesday and then decided to play a few more holes before it became dark. As they approached the tee on the seventh hole, Hollaby saw Sessle talking to a mysterious woman in a brown coat. They went off, talking, down a side path, and after a moment Sessle reappeared. Something had upset him for his game fell apart and two holes later Sessle gave up and walked off alone, presumably to his bungalow home. The existence of the woman in brown, Sessle's temporary departure with her, and his subsequent poor game were witnessed by two other members who were behind them on the course.

The next morning, Sessle was found dead on the seventh tee, stabbed with a hatpin through the heart. The police found forensic evidence on the man that led them to trace a young woman called Doris Evans. She was arrested and told a story of meeting Sessle at a cinema. He invited her to his bungalow on a day when, as she learned later, his wife and servants would be away. On the day in question, the man met her as he arrived home from the golf course. He behaved strangely and then, suggesting a stroll, he took her to the golf course. On the seventh tee he suddenly became deranged and produced a revolver, wildly suggesting a suicide pact. Doris escaped his grasp and ran off. It has come to light that Sessle and Hollaby's assurance business is in liquidation and the funds embezzled.

Over their table, Tuppence counters that Doris did not murder the man, as very few women nowadays use hatpins. That suggests that a man not conversant with fashions committed the crime and tried to frame a woman. Tommy soon remembers that near the seventh hole on the course is a small hut, and the two talk about the possibility that the woman in brown could have been a man in disguise. This leads them to wonder which man. Linked to Tuppence's theory that the embezzler of the company was not Sessle but Hollaby and his son, they speculate that the woman was Hollaby Junior in disguise. They reconstruct the crime: Hollaby's son in disguise lures Sessle away in full view of the other two players on the course. He stabs him with a hatpin and hides the body in a hut, changing into the coat of the dead man. The two witnesses on the course see at a distance the deterioration in his game and "Sessle" then goes to his bungalow where he meets Doris Evans as arranged and goes through a series of actions which lead to the innocent woman being arrested.

The Beresfords wonder how to convince the police of the plausibility of their theory. Inspector Marriot sits at the next table, listening intently to them. He was suspicious of the Hollabys and promises to set enquiries in motion.

=== The House of Lurking Death ===
The Beresfords receive a professional visit from a smartly dressed young woman, Lois Hargreaves of Thurnly Grange, her house in the country. One week before, her household received a box of chocolates anonymously through the post. Not liking chocolates, she did not eat any, and consequently she was the only one who was not taken ill afterwards. The cause was arsenic poisoning and this is the third occurrence in the area of such a gift and its after-effects. What perturbs Miss Hargreaves is that the paper in which the chocolates were wrapped was re-used from a previous parcel sent to the Grange, evidenced by a small doodle of three intertwined fish that she drew on it. The poisoner is therefore someone in her own home.

Miss Hargreaves is a rich heiress. She inherited her fortune from her aunt, the wealthy widow Lady Radclyffe. Lady Radclyffe had invited Lois to live with her, and she always made it clear to Lois that she intended to leave the bulk of her estate to Dennis Radclyffe, her late husband's nephew. After a quarrel with the young man she quietly changed her will in favour of Lois. Three weeks earlier, when she turned 21, Lois made a will leaving her money to Dennis. He lives at the Grange with her, as does Miss Logan, an old lady who is a cousin of Dennis and a former companion to Lady Radclyffe. Mary Chilcott, an old schoolfriend of Lois, is also living at the Grange. The servants are a cook, a kitchenmaid, a parlourmaid called Esther, and an elderly maid called Hannah.

The next day, Tommy and Tuppence plan to travel down to the Grange; before leaving, they read the news that Lois is dead, killed by a poison which also affected Dennis and Miss Logan. The source is fig paste in sandwiches eaten by the three but not by Mary Chilcott, who is unaffected. They meet Dr Burton who is looking after the patients and who tells them that Dennis died early that morning. The doctor has not yet identified the poison, but it was not arsenic. They learn that Dennis was out when the sandwiches were eaten for tea. Tuppence finds that he was seen by one of the maids to drink a cocktail, and gets hold of the glass before it is washed.

In speaking with everyone in the house, they meet Hannah, who quotes dark lines from scripture, bringing fire and brimstone on all concerned. She has an old book on poisons and medicines by Edward Logan, Miss Logan's father, a pioneer of serum therapeutics. They confirm this from the ill old lady. Tuppence notices that she has a mass of small pinpricks on her arm.

They call at Dr Burton's and find out that the poison is ricin and, from the entry in Edward Logan's book, deduce that Miss Logan is the murderer. The pinpricks on her arm are from injections of small amounts of the poison she has been giving herself to build up immunity. As next of kin to Dennis, she would inherit once Lois, then Dennis, died. The near-mad Hannah hears this accusation and then bursts into Miss Logan's room and attacks her, starting a fire in the process. Tommy stifles the flames but the shock of this event causes Miss Logan to die. Dr Burton confirms that the cocktail glass contained traces of ricin.

=== The Unbreakable Alibi ===
Tommy and Tuppence's latest client is a personable, rich, but slightly dense young man called Mr Montgomery Jones. He has met an Australian woman called Una Drake with whom he has fallen violently in love. Talking of their mutual love of detective stories, she has made a bet with him that he cannot break an alibi she has set up for herself. She has agreed that if he wins he can ask her for anything he likes, and it is his intention to ask her for her hand in marriage. Knowing full well that he is not known for his intelligence, Montgomery Jones asks the Beresfords to take on the task for him.

The alibi is that on the previous Tuesday Miss Drake dined at a Soho restaurant, saw a West End show, and then had supper with a Mr le Marchant at the Savoy Hotel. At the same time, she stayed the night at the Castle Hotel in Torquay and returned to London the next morning. Armed with a photograph of Miss Drake and the knowledge of the methods of Inspector French, Tommy and Tuppence interview Mr le Marchant who confirms that he was with the young lady for part of the evening in question. He states that Miss Drake made an oblique comment about being in Devonshire at the same time, which he considers strange since a friend of his was at the Castle Hotel and did indeed think he saw her there. The two investigate the Soho restaurant (where a positive identification of the young woman is not forthcoming). They travel to Torquay where they find plenty of evidence that Miss Drake was in the hotel throughout the night and that she traveled to the resort when she was in London. Back in London, they finally question some people who saw Una at the Savoy, and also her flatmate and charwoman, who both attest that she spent the night in her own bed.

Working all evening on puzzling out the problem, the Beresfords confess that they are stumped. Sleeping on the problem, the next morning Tuppence awakes to a flash on inspiration and sends off a cable to test her idea. Later that day she returns to their office with the solution – Una has a twin sister who, the cable to Australia has confirmed, arrived in England the day before the events in question. The fun-loving sisters thought the stunt would be an amusing joke to play on Montgomery Jones.

=== The Clergyman's Daughter / The Red House ===
It is just before Christmas when a young lady called Monica Deane calls at Blunt's agency. She and her impoverished, widowed, invalid mother inherited a house from a well-off sister of her father's. They expected to inherit some money to go with the house but, to their surprise, there was little forthcoming. They did not want to sell the house, as it provided plenty of room for them compared to their small flat. They made plans to open the house to paying guests to supplement their income. All went well for a time until they started to have strange occurrences with pictures falling off walls and crockery being smashed when no one was in the room – a poltergeist, which scared their guests and their income away. A Dr O'Neill from the Society for Psychical Research has visited and offered to buy the house from them to further his investigations. Monica, however, is certain that he is the younger man (now in disguise) who previously made them an offer for the house. The only other resident in the house now is Crockett, an elderly maid of Monica's aunt who has a young nephew of whom she is very proud.

Tommy and Tuppence travel to the "Red House" and begin their investigations, harbouring suspicions that the old lady had hidden money in the building that would account for the remainder of her fortune being missing. Tommy makes a visit to the local bank and finds out from the manager that the aunt withdrew all of her money before she died. Under the guise of potential buyers, they explore the house and Monica gives them papers of her aunt's. Before they can investigate these further, they hear a crash and find a jug and basin broken in a room overhead. They quickly interview Crockett and notice that she is out of breath. They mention to her that they intend to buy the house. Monica receives a message soon afterwards from "Dr O'Neill" that his own offer has increased. It is obvious that the old maid is the one creating "disturbances" and that the "Doctor" is her nephew, trying to get the house so that he can investigate the location of the missing fortune.

Tommy and Tuppence look over the papers and realise that one of them contains a puzzle anagram. They work it out and the solution is "potatoes". Another of the papers, on the theme of recipes, refers to the trick of burying new potatoes in a tin to keep them fresh for the winter; they realise that this is their lead. They question the gardener to see if the old lady ever used this technique and find out that she did. They dig in the spot and find several tins of potatoes and, in one of the tins, a bag containing two hundred pounds in gold sovereigns, twenty thousand pounds in banknotes, and a string of expensive pearls. Monica Deane and her mother will have their fortune, and the Deanes and the Beresfords will celebrate a happy Christmas.

=== The Ambassador's Boots ===
The Blunt's agency is visited by Randolph Wilmott, the United States Ambassador to Great Britain. He arrived back from a trip to his home country a week ago. Soon after his return, his valet informed him that his kit bag, which carried his initials, had been mistakenly taken by another passenger on board the liner with the same initials – Senator Ralph Westerham, also from the US – but quickly returned by that man's valet. The puzzle is that Mr Wilmott met Mr Westerham yesterday and the Senator denied the mistake, stating that he did not have such an article amongst his luggage during the voyage across the Atlantic Ocean. Mr Wilmott knows the matter is a trivial one, but his curiosity has been piqued and he wishes the agency to investigate.

At Mr Wilmott's invitation, the Beresfords visit the US Embassy and speak to Richards, his valet, who confirms the basics of the tale told by the Ambassador. Just before the other valet called for the bag, he had started to unpack it and had glimpsed its contents. It contained boots and toilet things, and a tin of bath salts. Tommy wonders if the Ambassador's bag could have been tampered with on the voyage, and Richards recalls the incident of a young lady called Eileen O'Hara being taken ill just outside the Ambassador's cabin, and he having to fetch a doctor for her, leaving the cabin alone. When he returned with the medical man, the patient seemed fine.

Tommy decides that their next line of action is to advertise for Miss O'Hara to come forward, even though they risk putting her on her guard if she was involved in tampering with the kit bag. Two days later, Albert shows into Tommy's office a Miss Cicely March who is answering the advertisement, but before she can relate what she knows they are interrupted by a big, dark, Spanish-looking man who holds them up at gunpoint. He has followed Miss March, having recognised her as a passenger on the liner, and he suspects that she is about to meddle in his plans. Before he can carry out any of his threats, he is accosted by Albert and disarmed. Tommy throws him out, deciding not to involve the police.

Alone with Tommy, Miss March tells a tale of having also seen the incident of Miss O'Hara on the liner: The supposedly ill woman, when she thought she was alone and unobserved, went into Mr Wilmott's cabin and put something into the lining of a boot through a slit which she cut. Worried about what she had done to the boot, Miss March later went into the empty cabin and extracted the object from the lining. It was a slip of paper with verses from the Bible; but only yesterday, by accident, the paper became wet, revealing hidden writing that looks like the plans of a harbour. The paper is back at her place of work – a beauty parlour in Bond Street where she is the US agent for preparations used in beauty treatments. Tommy leaves a note for Tuppence, and he and Miss March go to her beauty parlour.

Preparing to take a taxi, Tommy notices that the cab has just refused a fare further down the road and, suspicious that they are being watched, insists on walking to Bond Street. Once there, they pass through the front of the shop, past a woman customer and two waiting men, and go into a back office where Tommy is immediately set upon. Rescue is instant, however, as the woman in the front of the shop is Tuppence and the two men are policemen, alerted by Tommy's note. He noticed a look of disappointment on Miss March's face when their assailant at the agency was overcome, and realised she was in the enemy's camp. He had also worked out that it was not the ambassador's bag that was important. Rather, a different bag was in the ambassador's possession for an hour or two, thereby bypassing customs for reasons of diplomatic immunity. Tommy delayed their arrival at the parlour to give Tuppence and the police time to get there first. They search the premises and find tins of bath salts which contain cocaine.

=== The Man Who Was No. 16 ===
Mr Carter congratulates the Beresfords on their successes at the agency, but he gives them a warning that Moscow has become suspicious of the failure to hear from their agents, and that they have despatched a man to investigate. The agent is known to them, having caused them problems in the past, but he is master of disguise and linguistics. He is also the deviser of the "No. 16" code and they expect him to turn up at Blunt's – although he has never met the real Theodore Blunt and doesn't know that Tommy has been impersonating him. The Beresfords are given other known codes to watch out for and are asked to co-operate as much as they can with "No. 16" to help Carter get to him.

The two go back to the agency where they find that too many leaves have been torn from a calendar so that it now shows the date as Sunday the sixteenth, which is six days hence. Albert tells them that could only have been done by a client who waited for some time for them that morning – a hospital nurse.

After a short while, another client is shown in – a fair, bearded man who goes by the name of Prince Vladiroffsky, and who starts to use the codes communicated to them by Mr Carter. Upon being questioned, the Beresfords tell him that treachery is afoot. "No. 16" assumes that Tuppence is an agent known as "Marise" and suggests that she lunch with him at the Blitz hotel, and that they then meet Tommy later on at Headquarters. They leave and Tommy communicates with Mr Carter, whose men have been listening in to the conversation in the office. Going to the Blitz, the "Prince" and Tuppence dine, served by waiters, some of whom are policemen in disguise. They then go up in the lifts to the "Prince"'s suite, but when they fail to appear some time later, the lift man tells Tommy and Mr Carter that he took them to a different floor instead. They have been spotted going into the room of a Mrs Van Snyder of Detroit and, breaking into this room, they find the room's occupant bound and gagged. "No. 16" took Tuppence through into an adjoining room booked by an invalid Frenchman and his nurse (more agents of No. 16) and made his escape that way with Tuppence as a hostage, drugged and disguised as the invalid.

Tommy is distraught at the thought of what might be happening to Tuppence. Albert tries to cheer him up, reminding him of Tuppence's resourcefulness. In talking to Albert, Tommy is struck by an idea and races back to the Blitz where he and one of Carter's men return to Mrs Van Snyder's room. They find the lady still there, recovering on the bed. Under the bolster on the bed, Tommy finds Tuppence – he realised that there wasn't enough time to bind and gag Mrs Van Snyder, drug Tuppence, and disguise her as a Frenchman. Therefore, she must still have been in the room and, remembering the bolster as a hiding place from childhood games, saw that as the only place she could be. He also unmasks "No. 16" – disguised as Mrs Van Snyder.

Tuppence quickly recovers and the two decide to give up the agency, after Tuppence tells a delighted Tommy that she is expecting a baby.

== Literary significance and reception ==
The review of the book in the Times Literary Supplement's issue of 17 October 1929 seemed to recognise the tongue-in-cheek nature of the work when it stated that "Mrs Christie has given an amusing twist to the episodes by suggesting that the two partners in "Blunt's Brilliant Detectives" assume on each occasion the method, the manner of speech, and the outlook favoured by some well-known detective of fiction. Holmes, Thorndyke, Father Brown and even Poirot are amiably parodied, and once or twice the solution as well as the dialogue is deliberately facetious." The review ended by saying that "the author is incorrect in the explanation she gives of the printer's marks on newspapers, the distinction of dates which she makes really being one of editions".

The review in The New York Times Book Review of 22 September 1929 began by observing "To describe adequately such a book as this is no easy matter. It is a group of short detective stories within a detective novel, for there is a rather sketchy, but nonetheless absorbing plot which holds the separate tales together. The entire book and the separate stories may be taken as hilarious burlesque or parodies of current detective fiction, or they may be taken as serious attempts on the part of the author to write stories in the manner of some of the masters of the art. Taken either way they are distinctly worth while." The review concluded that "The result is the merriest collection of detective stories it has been our good fortune to encounter."

The Scotsman of 16 September 1929 said,

Detective fiction, like mathematics, tends to develop a language of its own which to the uninitiated can be a little troublesome. It is not so much a matter of 'blue-nosed automatics' and other jargon of the craft of detective fiction; the trouble is that many of the writers seem to have little command of English and cannot make their characters speak naturally. Agatha Christie is a notable exception. In this volume of stories she has conceived the ingenious idea of setting her two amateur detectives ... to work out their problems after the fashion of various heroes of detective fiction. This enables her to parody the methods of various writers ... in a way that is most enjoyable, for her literary skill is equal to the task. At the same time the stories are genuinely detective stories. They are well wrought and ingenious. The writer has the saving grace of humour and she does not let her detectives win too easily. By having two detectives who are usually alternately successful she has always a foil, less obtuse than 'my dear Watson'.

The Daily Express issue of 10 October 1929 gave the book a review of a couple of lines which concluded that the stories were "not quite up to her level, although they are entertaining enough".

Robert Barnard described this as: "Tommy and Tuppence in a series of short stories which parody detective writers and their methods. Many of these are long forgotten, but the parodies are not sharp enough for this to matter very much. The House of Lurking Death anticipates the solution of Dorothy L. Sayers's Strong Poison."

== Film, TV or theatrical adaptations ==
=== Television ===
The Case of the Missing Lady (1950) from Partners in Crime aired as the twelfth episode in the twenty-six episode anthology series The Nash Airflyte Theater on Thursday, 7 December 1950 (possibly under the title of The Disappearance of Mrs Gordan). The 30-minute live transmission on CBS was at 10:30 pm from New York City. There are differing accounts of who starred in the adaptation. Peter Haining states that the stars were Barbara Bel Geddes as Tuppence and Lee Bowman as Tommy but other sources state that the stars were Ronald Reagan and Cloris Leachman The adaptation was written and directed by Marc Daniels.

In 1983, a ten-episode television adaptation called Agatha Christie's Partners in Crime was made by London Weekend Television with James Warwick as Tommy, Francesca Annis as Tuppence, and Reece Dinsdale as Albert. It was first broadcast in the UK between 16 October 1983 and 14 January 1984.

The 2015 BBC television series Partners in Crime was not an adaptation of this short story collection, instead being an adaptation of two Christie novels: The Secret Adversary and N or M?.

=== Radio ===
Partners in Crime was adapted as a 13-part radio serial broadcast on the BBC's London, Midland and Scottish Home Service from Monday, 13 April to Monday, 13 July 1953. The half-hour episodes starred Richard Attenborough as Tommy and Sheila Sim as Tuppence, taking advantage of the actors' then-current starring roles in The Mousetrap. Oscar Quitak appeared in all episodes as Albert.

Aside from a 1948 adaptation of Ten Little Niggers, this was the first adaptation of a Christie book for radio in the UK.

== Publication history ==
Dustjacket illustration of the UK First Edition (Book was first published in the US)

- 1929, Dodd Mead and Company (New York), 1929, Hardcover, 277 pp
- 1929, William Collins and Sons (London), 16 September 1929, Hardcover, 256 pp
- c.1929, Lawrence E. Spivak (New York), Abridged edition, 126 pp
- 1943, Dodd Mead and Company, (As part of the Triple Threat along with Poirot Investigates and The Mysterious Mr. Quin), Hardcover
- 1958, Fontana Books (Imprint of HarperCollins), Paperback, 189 pp
- 1962, Pan Books, Paperback (Great Pan G526), 203 pp
- 1963, Dell Books (New York), Paperback, 224 pp
- 1986, Ulverscroft Large-print Edition, Hardcover, ISBN 0-7089-1540-X
- 2010, HarperCollins; Facsimile edition, Hardcover: 256 pages, ISBN 978-0-00-735463-4

Chapters from the book appeared in Agatha Christie's Crime Reader, published by Cleveland Publishing in 1944 along with other selections from Poirot Investigates and The Mysterious Mr. Quin.

=== First publication of stories ===
All of the stories in Partners in Crime first appeared in magazines between 1923 and 1928, principally The Sketch magazine. For publication in book form, Christie rearranged the story order and changed the framing device of several of the chapters to make the flow of the book easier. The original order and publication details of the stories are as follows:

- The First Wish: First published in issue 226 of The Grand Magazine in December 1923. This formed the basis for chapters 20 and 21 of the book – The Clergyman's Daughter / The Red House. The story was illustrated by Arthur Ferrier.
- Publicity: First published in issue 1652 of The Sketch on 24 September 1924. This formed the basis for chapters 1 and 2 of the book – A Fairy in the Flat / A Pot of Tea. This was the first in a sequence of twelve consecutive stories Christie wrote for The Sketch which appeared under the subtitle of Tommy and Tuppence.
- The Affair of the Pink Pearl: First published in issue 1653 of The Sketch on 1 October 1924. This formed the basis for chapters 3 and 4 of the book which uses the same chapter title.
- Finessing the King: First published in issue 1654 of The Sketch on 8 October 1924. This formed the basis for chapters 7 and 8 of the book – Finessing the King / The Gentleman Dressed in Newspaper.
- The Case of the Missing Lady: First published in issue 1655 of The Sketch on 15 October 1924. This formed the basis for chapter 9 of the book which uses the same chapter title.
- The Case of the Sinister Stranger: First published in issue 1656 of The Sketch on 22 October 1924. This formed the basis for chapters 5 and 6 of the book which use the slightly amended title of The Adventure of the Sinister Stranger.
- The Sunninghall Mystery: First published in issue 1657 of The Sketch on 29 October 1924. This formed the basis for chapters 15 and 16 of the book which use the slightly amended title of The Sunningdale Mystery.
- The House of Lurking Death: First published in issue 1658 of The Sketch on 5 November 1924. This formed the basis for chapters 17 and 18 of the book which use the same chapter title.
- The Matter of the Ambassador's Boots: First published in issue 1659 of The Sketch on 12 November 1924. This formed the basis for chapter 22 of the book which uses the shortened title of The Ambassador's Boots.
- The Affair of the Forged Notes: First published in issue 1660 of The Sketch on 19 November 1924. This formed the basis for chapters 13 and 14 of the book using the different title of The Crackler.
- Blindman's Buff: First published in issue 1661 of The Sketch on 26 November 1924. This formed the basis for chapter 10 of the book which uses the same chapter title.
- The Man in the Mist: First published in issue 1662 of The Sketch on 3 December 1924. This formed the basis for chapters 11 and 12 of the book which uses the same chapter title.
- The Man who was Number Sixteen: First published in issue 1663 of The Sketch on 10 December 1924. This formed the basis for chapter 23 of the book which uses the same chapter title and was also the final story Christie ever wrote for The Sketch.

After a gap of four years a final story, The Unbreakable Alibi, appeared in Holly Leaves, the annual Christmas special of the Illustrated Sporting and Dramatic News in December 1928. This formed the basis for chapter 19 of the book.

=== Book dedication ===
As with most of Christie's short story collections, this book carried no dedication.

=== Dustjacket blurb ===
The blurb of the first UK edition (which is carried on both the back of the dustjacket and opposite the title page) reads:

This delightfully witty book will come as a pleasant surprise to all admirers of these ingenious detective thrillers for which Agatha Christie is famous. It tells the story of the amazing adventures of two amateur detectives – Tommy, a remarkable young man of thirty-two, and his equally remarkable wife, Tuppence – who follow the methods of famous detective heroes, such as Sherlock Holmes, Inspector French, Roger Sherringham, Bulldog Drummond, Father Brown and even Monsieur Poirot himself. Problem after problem comes before them for solution, and the account of their endeavours to live up to their slogan, 'Blunt's Brilliant Detectives! Any case solved in twenty-four hours!' makes delicious reading.

The blurb was incorrect in that "Sapper's" Bulldog Drummond stories were not parodied, although the character and the situations that he encountered were briefly mentioned in The Adventure of the Sinister Stranger.
