= Agatha Christie's Partners in Crime =

Television series

- Directed by: Paul Annett; Christopher Hodson; Tony Wharmby
- Starring: James Warwick, Francesca Annis
- Music by: Joseph Horovitz
- Country of origin: United Kingdom
- Original language: English
- No. of episodes: 10 (+ pilot TV movie)

Production
- Running time: 50 minutes
- Production company: London Weekend Television

Original release
- Network: ITV
- Release: 9 October 1983 – 14 January 1984

Agatha Christie's Partners in Crime is a 1983 British television series based on the short stories of the same name by Agatha Christie. It was directed by Paul Annett, Tony Wharmby and Christopher Hodson, and starred Francesca Annis and James Warwick in the leading roles of wife and husband sleuths Prudence 'Tuppence' and Tommy Beresford. Reece Dinsdale co-starred as Albert in all but two episodes.

== Synopsis ==
The series follows the adventures and exploits of the Beresfords, who have recently taken over the running of Blunt's International Detective Agency based in London. Each episode features one of the stories from the short story collection. Among these are a quest for missing jewels, the investigation of poltergeists and a story involving poisoned chocolates.

The series followed the short stories closely with two notable exceptions: First, the detective parodies, although alluded to on occasion, were for the most part dispensed with. Secondly, the story arc of the blue Russian letters and the search for the agent known as Number 16 were also dispensed with. For this reason three chapters (The Adventure of the Sinister Stranger, Blindman's Bluff and The Man Who Was No. 16) were not adapted.

The series' original run was immediately preceded by transmission on 9 October 1983 of the same production team's adaptation of Christie's second novel The Secret Adversary, which also starred Annis and Warwick in the same roles and which acted as an introduction for viewers to Agatha Christie's Partners in Crime.

== Reception ==
The series ran for one season between 16 October 1983 and 14 January 1984 with ten episodes. It was poorly received at the time, but was later shown in the United States, where John Tribe, the series graphic designer, won an award at the 1985 Emmy Awards for Outstanding Graphic and Title Design in recognition of the programme's title sequence.

As of 2007, the series is regularly aired in the UK on the digital channel ITV3. Unavailable on DVD for a long period, it was released by Acorn Media UK on 2 September 2013. In 2025, the series, beginning with "The Affair of the Pink Pearl" episode, is streamed via Britbox.

== Episodes ==
Title	UK airdate	Guest cast
The Secret Adversary	9 October 1983	Gavan O'Herlihy (as Julius P. Hersheimmer); George Baker (as Mr Whittington); Alec McCowen (as Sir James Peele Edgerton); Honor Blackman (as Rita Vandemeyer); Arthur Cox (as Inspector Marriott); Peter Barkworth (as Carter); Toria Fuller (as Jane Finn) / John Fraser (as Kramenin); Donald Houston (as Boris); Joseph Brady (as Dr Hall); Wolf Kahler (as The German); Peter Lovstrom (as Henry); Matthew Scurfield (as Conrad); Holly Watson (as Child on Beach) / Phyllida Hewat (as Woman in Tea Shop); James Walker (as First Clerk); Mike Elles (as Second Clerk); Gabrielle Blunt (as Annie); Norman Hartley (as Florist); Roger Ostime (as Ritz Hotel Receptionist); Nicholas Geake (as Watson)
The Affair of the Pink Pearl	16 October 1983	Dulcie Gray (as Lady Laura Barton); Arthur Cox (as Inspector Marriott); William Hootkins (as Hamilton Betts); Graham Crowden (as Colonel Kingston Bruce); Susannah Morley (as Beatrice Kingston Bruce); Lynda La Plante (as Phyllis Betts) / Charles Shaughnessy (as John Rennie); Fleur Chandler (as Janet Smith); Ursula Mohan (as Elsie); Tim Woodward (as Lawrence St Vincent); Noel Dyson (as Mrs Kingston Bruce)
The House of Lurking Death	23 October 1983	Liz Smith (as Hannah McPherson); Lynsey Baxter (as Lois Hargreaves); Kim Clifford (as Rose Holloway); Michael Cochrane (as Captain Dennis Radcliffe) / Deddie Davies (as Mrs Holloway); Anita Dobson (as Esther Quant); Louisa Rix (as Mary Chilcott); Joan Sanderson (as Rachel Logan) / Granville Saxton (as Dr Burton)
The Sunningdale Mystery	30 October 1983	Denis Lill (as Hollaby Junior); Jim Wiggins (as Ticket Collector); Edwin Brown (as Hollaby Senior); Terence Conoley (as Major Barnard) / Denis Holmes (as Lecky); Emily Moore (as Doris Evans); Robin Parkinson (as Landlord); Dorothea Phillips (as Waitress) / Vivienne Ritchie (as Girl)
The Clergyman's Daughter	6 November 1983	Jane Booker (as Monica Deane); Bill Dean (as Edmund Hove); David Delve (as Percival Smart); David Delve (as Dr O'Neil) / Geoffrey Drew (as Norman Partridge); Alan Jones (as Gerald Rush); Elspeth MacNaughty (as Bella Hove) / George Malpas (as Frank Mulberry); Pam St. Clement (as Mrs Crockett); Ben Stevens (as Cockwell)
Finessing the King	27 November 1983	Arthur Cox (as Inspector Marriott); Benjamin Whitrow (as Sir Arthur Merivale); Annie Lambert (as Lady Merivale) / Peter Blythe (as Captain Bingo Hale); Anna Turner (as Widow); John Gillett (as Dr Stoughton)
The Ambassador's Boots	4 December 1983	Arthur Cox (as Inspector Marriott); Moira Brooker (as Tilly); Michael Carter (as Rodriguez); T. P. McKenna (as Randolph Wilmott) / Tricia George (as Poppy St Albans); Jennie Linden (as Cicely March); Clive Merrison (as Richards); Catherine Schell (as Virma La Strange) / Norma West (as Estelle Blaney); Jo Ross (as Gwen Foster)
The Man in the Mist	11 December 1983	Tim Brierly (as James Reilly); Roger Kemp (as Inspector Jeavons); Christopher Johnston (as PC Bamford); Geoffrey Greenhill (as Police Sergeant); Valerie Lilley (as Ellen) / Constantine Gregory (as Bulger Escourt); Patrick Marley (as Lord Leconbury); Linda Marlowe (as Gilda Glenn); Anne Stallybrass (as Dorothea Honeycott); Paddy Ward (as Barman) / Mark Farmer (as Page Boy)
The Unbreakable Alibi	18 December 1983	Ellis Dale (as Henri); Michael Jayes (as Peter Le Marchant); Preston Lockwood (as Head Waiter); Tim Meats (as Montgomery Jones) / Anna Nygh (as Una Drake); Anna Nygh (as Vera Drake); Gay Soper (as Hotel Receptionist); Stephen Wale (as Car Park Attendant) / Elaine Wells (as Chambermaid)
The Case of the Missing Lady	1 January 1984	Jonathan Newth (as Gabriel Stavansson); Rowena Cooper (as Dr Irma Kleber); Ewan Hooper (as Dr Horriston); Elspeth March (as Lady Susan Clonray) / Elizabeth Murray (as Hermione Leigh Gordon); Tim Pearce (as Muldoon); Mischa de la Motte (as Manservant) / Susie Fairfax (as Girl in Shop)
The Crackler	14 January 1984	Shane Rimmer (as Hank Ryder); Arthur Cox (as Inspector Marriott); Carolle Rousseau (as Marguerite Laidlaw); David Quilter (as Major Laidlaw) / Christopher Scoular (as Captain James Faulkener); Peter Godfrey (as Maybrick); Lawrence Davidson (as Monsieur Héroulade) / Terence Hillyer (as Chauffeur); Stan Pretty (as Harry the Barman)
