= Phoebe Eclair-Powell =

British playwright

- Born: 1989 (age 36–37); Camberwell, London, England
- Education: University of Oxford
- Occupation: Playwright
- Children: 1

Phoebe Eclair-Powell (born 1989) is a British playwright from South-East London. Her plays include WINK (Theatre503) and One Under (Pleasance Below). As an actress, she appeared in Peckham: The Soap Opera at the Royal Court. Her play Fury was a finalist for the Verity Bargate Award at Soho Theatre. In the summer of 2016, Eclair Powell had three new shows running: Fury, at Soho Theatre, Torch at Underbelly and Epic Love and Pop Songs at Pleasance, both at the Edinburgh Fringe. In 2019, Eclair Powell won the Bruntwood Prize for Playwriting for her play Shed: Exploded View.

Eclair-Powell's mother is comedian Jenny Eclair. She studied English at Oxford University.

== Plays ==
- TORCH
- Epic Love and Pop Songs
- Fury
- WINK
- One Under
- Mrs Spine
- Bangin' Wolves
- These Bridges
