= The Secret Adversary =

1922 mystery novel by Agatha Christie

- Dust-jacket illustration of the first UK edition
- Author: Agatha Christie
- Cover artist: Ernest Akers
- Language: English
- Series: Tommy and Tuppence
- Genre: Crime novel
- Publisher: John Lane, The Bodley Head (UK); Dodd, Mead and Company (US)
- Publication date: January 1922 (UK)
- Publication place: London, United Kingdom; New York, N.Y., United States
- Media type: Print (hardback & paperback)
- Pages: 320 (first edition, hardback, UK); 330 (first edition, US)
- OCLC: 3672395
- Preceded by: The Mysterious Affair at Styles
- Followed by: The Murder on the Links
- Text: The Secret Adversary at Wikisource

The Secret Adversary is the second published mystery novel by British writer Agatha Christie, first published in January 1922 in the United Kingdom by John Lane at The Bodley Head and in the United States by Dodd, Mead and Company later in that same year. The UK edition retailed at seven shillings and sixpence (7/6) and the US edition at $1.75.

The book introduces the characters of Tommy and Tuppence who feature in three other Christie novels and one collection of short stories; the five Tommy and Tuppence books span Agatha Christie's writing career. They are hired for a job that leads them both to many dangerous situations, meeting allies as well, including an American millionaire in search of his cousin.

Reviews were generally positive on this adventure, which manages to keep the identity of the arch-criminal secret to the very end.

== Plot summary ==
In 1920 London, demobilised soldier Tommy Beresford reunites with his childhood friend and war volunteer Prudence "Tuppence" Cowley. In passing, he mentions that he overheard a man mention the name "Jane Finn," which he finds ridiculous. Out of work and money, they form "The Young Adventurers, Ltd".

Their first client, a Mr Whittington, makes Tuppence a suspiciously generous offer. Remembering Tommy's anecdote, when Whittington asks Tuppence her name, she gives him the alias "Jane Finn." A shocked Whittington offers her £50 hush money and asks her to return the following day, but when she returns, the office has been suddenly closed. They decide to advertise for information about "Jane Finn," and receive two replies, from a Mr. Carter and from Mr. Julius Hersheimmer.

Carter, who Tommy recognizes from his wartime service in British intelligence, tells them that Jane Finn is believed to have received a secret treaty from a British agent during the sinking of RMS Lusitania in May 1915, as she was more likely to survive. According to Mr. Carter, if the terms of the treaty were disclosed, it would cause the government to fall and precipitate a general strike. Mr. Carter hires Tommy and Tuppence to find her, but Carter warns them about an enemy agent known only as "Mr Brown."

They then get in touch with Julius Hersheimmer, who turns out to be an American multimillionaire, and Jane Finn's cousin, who has come to London to find her.

Tommy and Tuppence's investigation leads them to the home of Mrs. Marguerite "Rita" Vandemeyer, a woman with several powerful friends, including Whittington and Sir James Peel Edgerton, K C. Under cover, Tuppence obtains a job as Mrs. Vandemeyer's maid and enlists the help of a young boy working there named Albert. Edgerton cryptically suggests that Tuppence might be better off working for someone else. This leads Tommy and Tuppence to go to Edgerton's office to ask about the remark. When Tuppence resumes her disguise and returns to Vandemeyer's house, Vandemeyer discovers her deception, and holds her at gunpoint, until Tuppence wrests the gun away. Tuppence offers Vandemeyer a large bribe to tell the whereabouts of Jane Finn, but when Hersheimmer and Edgerton arrive, she screams and faints. They leave her in her bed but lock her in her room because of their fear of Mr. Brown. When they return in the morning, Vandemeyer is dead.

Meanwhile, Tommy follows Boris Ivanovitch, another of Rita's associates, to a house in Soho, where Tommy is taken prisoner while attempting to eavesdrop on a meeting of Bolshevist conspirators. A young French woman at the house, Annette, arranges his escape, but refuses to leave herself. Tommy returns to the Ritz and finds that Tuppence has just left in a hurry. Tommy and Hersheimmer find the telegram that caused Tuppence to flee, and attempt to follow her. They find that the address she was directed to is a long abandoned house. After a week of questioning the locals and searching the area they give up.

Sir James discovers Jane Finn, who has recovered her memory after an accident. She tells them where she hid the treaty, but they find instead a message from Mr. Brown. While searching for writing paper in Julius's drawer, Tommy finds a photograph of Annette. Tommy concludes that Annette is the real Jane Finn and the Jane Finn they met was a plant to stop their investigation. He gets an original copy of the telegram sent to Tuppence and sees that her destination was altered on the copy he read. Tommy and Albert proceed to the correct destination.

Hersheimmer arranges for the release of Tuppence and Annette. At Sir James's residence, Jane tells her story: after receiving the packet, she became suspicious of Mrs Vandemeyer. Jane placed blank sheets in the original packet, sealing the treaty inside magazine pages. Travelling from Ireland, she was mugged and taken to the house in Soho. Perceiving the intent of her captors, Jane faked amnesia, conversing only in French. She hid the treaty in a picture frame in her room and has maintained her role as "Annette" ever since. Tuppence suspects that Hersheimmer is Mr. Brown. Sir James agrees, adding that the real Hersheimmer was killed in America and that his imposter killed Mrs. Vandemeyer. They rush to Soho, recovering the treaty at the house. Sir James identifies himself as the true Mr. Brown, and announces his plan to kill them, wound himself, and then blame it on the elusive Mr. Brown. Julius and Tommy, who are hiding in the room, overwhelm Sir James. He commits suicide using poison concealed in his ring, the compelling evidence to persuade Mr. Carter of his old friend's guilt.

Tommy’s role in solving the mystery persuades his estranged rich uncle to support him financially and make Tommy his heir. The novel ends with both Hersheimmer and Jane, and Tommy and Tuppence, engaged to marry.

== Characters ==
- Thomas Beresford: Tommy, young redheaded Englishman who fought in the Great War, wounded twice, considered slow but steady and clear-headed in his thinking, at his best in a tight situation. In his early twenties.
- Prudence L Cowley: Tuppence, young woman with black bobbed hair, one of several children of a conservative archdeacon, served in the Voluntary Aid Detachment (VAD) during the Great War. She is modern and stylish, quick and intuitive in her thinking, acts rapidly on her ideas. In her early twenties.
- Julius P Hersheimmer: Millionaire from America, seeking his first cousin Jane Finn, a girl he never met in America due to a family quarrel. He is quick-thinking, quick-acting, and being from America, he carries a gun and knows how to use it. In his early thirties.
- Mr Carter: Englishman skilled in the intelligence service and connected with the highest political powers, known only by this alias.
- Jane Finn: American woman, 18 years old when she left the US, with good skills in speaking French, who aimed to work in a war hospital during the Great War.
- Marguerite Vandemeyer: a beautiful woman in society who followed Danvers on the Lusitania.
- Albert: Lift boy at the building in which Rita Vandemeyer lives, becomes helper to Tuppence, then to Tommy.
- Mr Whittington: Member of the conspirators who first encounters Tommy and Tuppence as they plan their joint venture over lunch in a restaurant.
- Boris Ivanovitch, Count Stepanov: Member of the conspiracy, who keeps in touch with Whittington and Rita.
- Mr Kramenin: Russian Bolshevik, serving in London, and one of the conspirators, called number one.
- Dr Hall: Runs the nursing home in Bournemouth where he took in the amnesia patient as a niece of Rita Vandemeyer, under the name Janet, for several years.
- Sir James Peel Edgerton: MP and prominent London defence lawyer, known to instinctively identify a criminal. He is socially and politically well known, and seen as a potential future prime minister.
- "Mr Brown": the anonymous leader of the conspirators.

== Literary significance and reception ==
Upon publication of the first book edition it was reviewed by The Times Literary Supplement in its edition of 26 January 1922, which described it as "a whirl of thrilling adventures". It stated that the characters of Tommy and Tuppence were "refreshingly original" and praised the fact that the "identity of the arch-criminal, the elusive "Mr Brown", is cleverly concealed to the very end".

The critic for The New York Times Book Review (11 June 1922) was also impressed: "It is safe to assert that unless the reader peers into the last chapter or so of the tale, he will not know who this secret adversary is until the author chooses to reveal him." The review gave something of a backhanded compliment when it said that Christie "gives a sense of plausibility to the most preposterous situations and developments." Nevertheless it conceded that

Miss Christie has a clever prattling style that shifts easily into amusing dialogue and so aids the pleasure of the reader as he tears along with Tommy and Tuppence on the trail of the mysterious Mr Brown. Many of the situations are a bit moth-eaten from frequent usage by other writers, but at that Miss Christie manages to invest them with a new sense of individuality that renders them rather absorbing.

Robert Barnard described the novel as "The first and best (no extravagant compliment this) of the Tommy and Tuppence stories. It tells how the dauntless pair foils a plot to foment labour unrest and red revolution in Britain, masterminded by the man behind the Bolshevists. Good reactionary fun, if you're in that mood."

Some additional blurbs regarding the book, and used by The Bodley Head for advertising subsequent print runs, were:

- "It's an excellent yarn and the reader will find it as impossible as we did to put it aside until the mystery has been fathomed." — Daily Chronicle
- "We promise our readers an exciting story of adventure, full of hairbreadth escapes, and many disappointments if they try to guess the riddle before the author is ready to give them the clue. — An excellent story." — Saturday Review.
- "The atmosphere of the book is admirable and the story will be read with avidity by all. Undoubtedly the book is a success." — East Anglian Daily Times.
- "A book of thrilling adventure. Sensational adventures which make thrilling and gripping reading. Mrs Christie has certainly succeeded in writing a story not only entertaining, but ingenious and amazingly clever." — Irish Independent.

== Adaptations ==
=== Film ===
The Secret Adversary was the second Christie work to be turned into a film. Made in Germany by the Orplid Film company, it was released in that country on 15 February 1929 as Die Abenteurer G.m.b.H., a silent movie which ran for 76 minutes. It was released in the UK and US under the title Adventures Inc. Character names from the book were changed for the film. Previously thought to be lost, it was given a rare showing at the National Film Theatre on 15 July 2001

=== Television ===
The novel was adapted twice for television, in 1983 and in 2014 (aired July–August 2015 in the UK).

The book was adapted by London Weekend Television as a 115-minute drama, and transmitted on Sunday, 9 October 1983. It acted as an introduction to a ten-part adaptation of Partners in Crime, made with the same stars, which began transmission one week later under the title Agatha Christie's Partners in Crime.

In February 2014, the BBC announced it had commissioned the TV series Partners in Crime, with three episodes as an adaptation of The Secret Adversary, written by Zinnie Harris. It aired in July/August 2015, marking the 125th anniversary of Dame Agatha Christie's birth. It is not set in the post-Great War period, so Tommy and Tuppence are not the young things of that era, are married and have a son sent off to school. It is instead set in 1952, with references made to the Cold War against Stalin.

=== Graphic novel adaptation ===
The Secret Adversary was released by HarperCollins as a graphic novel adaptation on 20 May 2008, adapted by François Rivière and illustrated by Frank Leclercq (ISBN 0-00-727461-0). This was translated from the edition first published in France by Emmanuel Proust éditions in 2003 under the title of Mister Brown.

=== Stage ===
Agatha Christie’s The Secret Adversary was presented for the stage for the first time in 2015 as a Watermill Theatre production, adapted from the Christie novel by Sarah Punshon and Johann Hari for a company of seven actors. A play in two acts, it was described in the publicity as being "shot through with fast-paced action, comedy, live music and a dash of romance". The live music was performed by the cast. Tuppence was played by Emerald O’Hanrahan, and Tommy by Garmon Rhys. It opened and ran at The Watermill Theatre, West Berkshire Playhouse from Thursday 12 February to Saturday 21 March, and then toured until Saturday 9 May, ending its run at the Rose Theatre, Kingston.

On 16 February 2016, Great Lakes Theater debuted a 70-minute stage adaptation as part of their educational programming. Adapted by David Hansen, this production is performed by a cast of five (3 men, 2 women) with most performers playing more than one role.

== Publication history ==
- 1922, John Lane (The Bodley Head), January 1922, Hardback, 320 pp
- 1922, Dodd Mead and Company (New York), 1922, Hardback, 330 pp
- 1927, John Lane (The Bodley Head), February 1927, Hardback (Cheap Edition – two shillings)
- 1946, Avon Books (New York), Avon number 100, Paperback, 264 pp
- 1955, Pan Books, Paperback (Pan number 357)
- 1957, Pan Books, Paperback (Great Pan GP82)
- 1967, Bantam Books (New York), Paperback
- 1976, Panther Books (London), Paperback; ISBN 0-586-04424-8
- 1991, Fontana Books (Imprint of HarperCollins), Paperback, 256pp; ISBN 0-00-617478-7
- 1991, Ulverscroft Large Print Edition, Hardcover; ISBN 0-7089-2441-7
- 2001, Signet (Penguin Group), Paperback
- 2007, Facsimile of 1922 UK first edition (HarperCollins), 5 November 2007, Hardcover, 320 pp; ISBN 0-00-726515-8

Like its predecessor, The Mysterious Affair at Styles, The Secret Adversary was first published as an unillustrated serialisation in The Times weekly edition (aka The Weekly Times) as a complete and unabridged text in seventeen instalments from 12 August (Issue 2328) to 2 December 1921 (Issue 2343). Christie was paid £50 for the serialisation rights (£1,545 in 2003 currency).

Christie's publisher, John Lane, was not very keen of the novel, since he had wanted her to write another detective novel along the lines of The Mysterious Affair at Styles.

=== Book dedication ===
The dedication of the book reads:
"To all those who lead monotonous lives in the hope that they experience at second hand the delights and dangers of adventure".

This statement was one of only two times that Christie addressed a dedication to her readers, the other occasion being the penultimate Tommy and Tuppence book, By the Pricking of My Thumbs in 1968.

=== Dustjacket blurb ===
The dustjacket front flap of the first edition carried no specially written blurb. Instead, it repeated the text which appeared on the jacket of The Mysterious Affair at Styles (the back jacket flap carrying review quotes of the earlier novel). In later editions, blurbs first published in the back of Poirot Investigates were used.
