= By the Pricking of My Thumbs =

1968 mystery novel by Agatha Christie

- Dust-jacket illustration of the first UK edition
- Author: Agatha Christie
- Cover artist: Kenneth Farnhill
- Language: English
- Genre: Crime novel
- Publisher: Collins Crime Club
- Publication date: November 1968
- Publication place: United Kingdom
- Media type: Print (hardback & paperback)
- Pages: 256 (first edition, hardcover)
- Preceded by: Endless Night
- Followed by: Hallowe'en Party

By the Pricking of My Thumbs is a mystery novel by Agatha Christie. It was first published in the UK by the Collins Crime Club in November 1968 and in the US by Dodd, Mead and Company later in the same year. The UK edition retailed at twenty-one shillings (21/-) and the US edition at $4.95. It features her detectives Tommy and Tuppence Beresford.

Tommy and Tuppence are middle-aged in this work (they aged from novel to novel).

The title of the book comes from Act 4, Scene 1 of William Shakespeare's Macbeth, when the second witch says:

By the pricking of my thumbs,
Something wicked this way comes.

== Synopsis ==
The novel is divided into four books.

In Book 1 Tommy and Tuppence Beresford visit Tommy’s aunt Ada in a retirement home called Sunny Ridge. While Tommy talks with his aunt, Tuppence has a conversation with another resident, Mrs Lancaster, who unexpectedly says "Was it your poor child? There behind the fireplace."

A few weeks later Aunt Ada dies of natural causes. When they return to the home after the funeral to make arrangements for Ada’s possessions, they find that Mrs Lancaster has suddenly departed. The matron tells them that a relative called Mrs Johnson took her away. Tuppence suspects there’s more to it and tries to find the relative but the trail turns cold. One of the items Aunt Ada had left is a painting of a house by a river. The picture strongly reminds Tuppence of a house she once saw and immediately liked. The painting was supposedly given to Aunt Ada by Mrs Lancaster.

In Book 2 Tommy is away for a few days, so Tuppence starts looking for the mystery house on her own. Eventually she finds it in a small village called Sutton Chancellor. It turns out that the house is divided in a peculiar way. The back part of the house is rented by a middle-aged couple called the Perrys. The front part has been vacant for years. Tuppence meets with the people of Sutton Chancellor. There is an elderly vicar, a talkative B&B landlady called Mrs Copleigh, and a Miss Bligh who seems to run the parish.

Under the pretence of house hunting, Tuppence tries to get more information about the house. Mrs Copleigh tells her a grim story about a spate of child killings some years ago. Then Tuppence fails to return home on the arranged day, having been concussed by a blow to the head.

In Book 3 Tommy and his servant Albert are worried about Tuppence. Tommy does some investigation on his own. He discovers the painting was by an artist called Boscowan who died several years ago. Tommy meets with the doctor of Sunny Ridge. There have been some deaths that the doctor finds odd and he is worried about possible foul play. Tommy then talks to an investigator friend who hints the house in Sutton Chancellor might have been used as a safe house for a criminal gang. Tommy shows the painting to Mrs Boscowan, who notes that someone has added a boat to the picture. At home, Tommy learns that Tuppence is in a hospital near Sutton Chancellor with severe concussion. Tommy and Albert then find a hidden letter from Aunt Ada, in which she suspects there is malice in Sunny Ridge.

In Book 4 Tuppence has recovered. An old doll she found in the mysterious house turns out to contain uncut diamonds. A party is arranged in Sutton Chancellor. Sir Phillip Starke, the local landowner, and Mrs Boscowan are invited. Tuppence has the impression that Sir Phillip knows more about the whole affair. The next day Tuppence goes to the vicarage and confronts Miss Bligh, who she suspects was the one who hit her on the head.

Alone, Tuppence goes to the mystery house and to her surprise finds the missing Mrs Lancaster. She takes Tuppence to a secret part of the house and proceeds to tell her life story. She was a wild child, a dancer, who got pregnant young. After she chose to abort the baby (“I was a dancer, I didn’t want a child... the doctor said it would be all right, but it wasn’t all right”), she took up with a criminal gang; they used the house to hide their loot. Later she left that life behind and got married, hoping to have a family, but could not conceive again and in her grief and guilt over the abortion became unhinged and started killing children. "The only way to atone for the first murder was more murders— they were sacrifices, see?"

One of the other residents, Mrs Moody, in Sunny Ridge had recognised her, so she had to be silenced. Miss Bligh, posing as a relative ("Mrs Johnson"), resettled her into a new home. After her candour, Mrs Lancaster attempts to kill Tuppence, first with poisoned milk, then with a metal blade.

Tuppence is saved just in time. It is revealed that Mrs Lancaster is actually the wife of Sir Phillip Starke. He had covered up her insanity and the crimes she committed. He was assisted in the cover-up by Miss Bligh, his former secretary and confidante. Tommy and Tuppence then return home.

== Literary significance and reception ==
The novel is dedicated "to the many readers in this and other countries who write to me asking: 'What has happened to Tommy and Tuppence? What are they doing now?'"

Francis Iles (Anthony Berkeley Cox) in The Guardian's issue of 13 December 1968 admitted that, "This is a thriller, not a detective story, and needless to say an ingenious and exciting one; but anyone can write a thriller (well, almost anyone), whereas a genuine Agatha Christie could be written by one person only."

Maurice Richardson in The Observer of 17 November 1968 said, "Not her best though it has patches of her cosy euphoria and aura of the sinister."

Robert Barnard said that this novel "Begins rather well, with a vicious old aunt of Tommy's in a genteel old people's home, but declines rapidly into a welter of half-realised plots and a plethora of those conversations, all too familiar in late Christie, which meander on through irrelevancies, repetitions and inconsequentialities to end nowhere (as if she had sat at the feet of Samuel Beckett).” He concluded his negative assessment of the plot by saying that it “Makes one appreciate the economy of dialogue – all point, or at least possible point, in early Christie."

== Film, TV or theatrical adaptations ==
In 2005, the novel was adapted by the French director Pascal Thomas under the title Mon petit doigt m'a dit...

The novel was adapted into a television film in 2006 as part of the Agatha Christie's Marple series starring Geraldine McEwan even though Miss Marple did not appear in the original story. Tommy and Tuppence were played by Anthony Andrews and Greta Scacchi.

== Publication history ==
- 1968, Collins Crime Club (London), November 1968, Hardcover, 256 pp
- 1968, Dodd Mead and Company (New York), 1968, Hardcover, 275 pp
- 1969, Pocket Books (New York), Paperback, 208 pp
- 1971, Fontana Books (Imprint of HarperCollins), Paperback, 191 pp
- 1987, Ulverscroft Large-print Edition, Hardcover, ISBN 0-7089-1571-X
- 2000, Signet (New York), Paperback, ISBN 0-451-20052-7
