= Partners in Crime (radio series) =

The Agatha Christie short story collection Partners in Crime was adapted as a 13-part radio serial broadcast on the BBC's London, Midland and Scottish Home Service and transmitted from Monday, April 13 to Monday, July 13, 1953. The half-hour episodes starred Richard Attenborough as Tommy and Sheila Sim as Tuppence, taking advantage of the actors' then-current starring roles in The Mousetrap. Oscar Quitak appeared in all episodes as Albert. Aside from a 1948 adaptation of Ten Little Niggers, this was the first adaptation of a Christie book for radio in the UK.

Adaptors: Rex Rienits and Colin Willock
Music composed and conducted by: Alan Paul
Producer: Audrey Cameron

== Episodes ==
Episode 1: Meet the Beresfords. Transmitted: Monday, April 13, 1953 at 7.30pm
Additional Cast:
Noel Coleman as Colonel Carter
John Stevens as Inspector Marriott

Episode 2: The Mysterious Stranger. Transmitted: Monday, April 20, 1953 at 7.45pm
Additional Cast:
John Stevens as Inspector Marriott
Norman Shelley as Dr. Carl Bower
Russell Napier as Dymchurch
Philip Ray as Coggins
John Warrington as Sergeant

Episode 3: The House of Lurking Death. Transmitted: Monday, April 27, 1953 at 7.45pm
Additional Cast:
John Stevens as Inspector Marriott
Cecile Chevreau as Lois Hargreaves
Lockwood West as Inspector Berkshire
Molly Rankin as Mary Chilcott
Joan Young as Hannah
Mary O'Farrell as Miss Logan

Episode 4: The Man in the Fog. Transmitted: Monday, May 4, 1953 at 7.45pm
Additional Cast:
Bryan Coleman as Bulger
Grizelda Hervey as Gilda Glen
Ronan O'Casey as Benjamin Reilly
Philip Ray as Taxi Driver
Peter Claughton as Constable
Ann Codrington as Mrs Wilcott
Molly Rankin as Ellen
Oskar Quitak as Waiter

Episode 5: The Ambassadors Boots. Transmitted: Monday, May 11, 1953 at 7.30pm
Additional Cast:
John Stevens as Inspector Marriott
Jimmy Dyrenforth as Randolph Bryant
Arthur Hill as Richards
Cecile Chevreau as Cecilia March
Martin Benson as Pietro

Episode 6: The Thin Woman. Transmitted: Monday, May 18, 1953 at 7.45pm
Additional Cast:
John Stevens as Inspector Marriott
Richard Williams as Local Inspector
Rex Palmer as Doctor
Duncan McIntyre as Robert Campbell
Gwenda Wilson as Doris Evans

Episode 7: A Stab in the Back. Transmitted: Monday, May 25, 1953 at 7.45pm
Additional Cast:
John Stevens as Inspector Marriott
Peter Claughton as Max Payne
Molly Rankin as Secretary
Noel Coleman as Colonel Carter
Felix Felton as Morton
Marjorie Westbury as Trina
Geoffrey Wincott as William Hill
John Gabriel as Walter Eccles

Episode 8: The Man with the Gold Tooth. Transmitted: Tuesday, June 9, 1953 at 7.00pm
Additional Cast:
Betty Hardy as Monica Dean
Mary O'Farrell as Mrs Deane
Elsa Palmer as Mrs Crockett
Stephen Jack as Gardener

Episode 9: The Crackler. Transmitted: Monday, June 15, 1953 at 7.45pm
Additional Cast:
John Stevens as Inspector Marriott
Betty Baskcomb as Marguerite Laidlaw
Robert Ayres as Hank Ryder
Keith Pyott as Monsieur Heroulade and a Croupier
Oskar Quitak as Barman and a Sergeant

Episode 10: In Camera. Transmitted: Monday, June 22, 1953 at 7.45pm
Additional Cast:
John Stevens as Inspector Marriott
Pamela Galloway as Beatrice Kingston
Ine Cameron as Mrs Kingston
Laidman Browne as Colonel Kingston
Mavis Villiers as Mrs Hamilton Betts
Olwen Brookes as Lady Laura
Lewis Stringer as George Rennie
Betty Huntley-Wright as Elise

Episode 11: Finessing the King. Transmitted: Monday, June 29, 1953 at 7.10pm
Additional Cast:
John Stevens as Inspector Marriott
Deryck Guyler as Sir Arthur Merivale
Molly Rankin as Catherine Merivale
John Warrington as Waiter

Episode 12: The Unbreakable Alibi. Transmitted: Monday, July 6, 1953 at 7.45pm
Additional Cast:
John Stevens as Inspector Marriott
Gwenda Wilson as Una Drake

Episode 13: The Man who was Number Sixteen. Transmitted: Monday, July 13, 1953 at 7.45pm
Additional Cast:
Noel Coleman as Colonel Carter
Geoffrey Wincott as Wilson
Humphrey Morton as Pendlebury
John Warrington as Myers
Maurice Denham as Vladirovsky
