= The Case of Miss Elliott =

Book by Emma Orczy

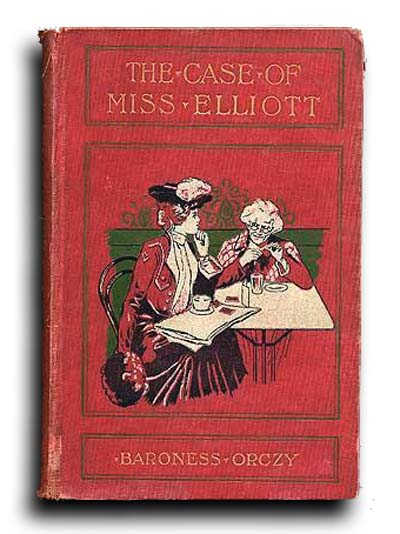
- First edition cover
- Author: Baroness Orczy
- Language: English
- Published: 1905 T. Fisher Unwin
- Publication place: UK
- Preceded by: The Old Man in the Corner
- Followed by: Unravelled Knots

The Case of Miss Elliott was Baroness Orczy's first collection of detective stories. It appeared in 1905 and featured the first of her detective characters, The Old Man in the Corner, who solves mysteries without leaving his chair.

This is one of three books of short stories featuring Orczy's armchair detective, and although the first published, it is second chronologically. The stories follow those in The Old Man in the Corner and precede those in Unravelled Knots.

The Old Man in the Corner stories first appeared in 1901 in The Royal Magazine, with the author receiving the large sum of £60. The stories were immediately popular, and the public clamoured for more. The stories in this collection were published in The Royal Magazine in 1904 and 1905. They include:

1. The Case of Miss Elliott
2. The Hocussing of Cigarette
3. The Tragedy in Dartmoor Terrace
4. Who Stole the Black Diamonds?
5. The Murder of Miss Pebmarsh
6. The Lisson Grove Mystery
7. The Tremarn Case
8. The Fate of the Artemis
9. The Disappearance of Count Collini
10. The Ayrsham Mystery
11. The Affair at the Novelty Theatre
12. The Tragedy of Barnsdale Manor

== Plot ==
The Old Man in the Corner is an undistinguished armchair detective who can often be found in a corner of the ABC Teashop on the corner of Norfolk Street and the Strand.

His listener and protégé is an attractive young journalist (named some editions as Polly Burton), who brings him details of obscure crimes baffling the police, which he helps her to solve. She is fascinated by the unlikely unravellings she hears, but despite her sarcasm and pride in her own investigative talents, she remains the learner, impressed in spite of herself.

Although The Old Man does not hide his upper class attitudes, he sometimes feels sympathy for the criminals.

The Old Man's cases include a wide range of sensational and complex detective puzzles:

- murder ("The Tremarn Case"),
- blackmail ("The Murder of Miss Pebmarsh"),
- perfect alibis ("The Case of Miss Elliott"),
- and thefts ("The Affair at the Novelty Theatre").
