= Bread =

Food made of flour and water

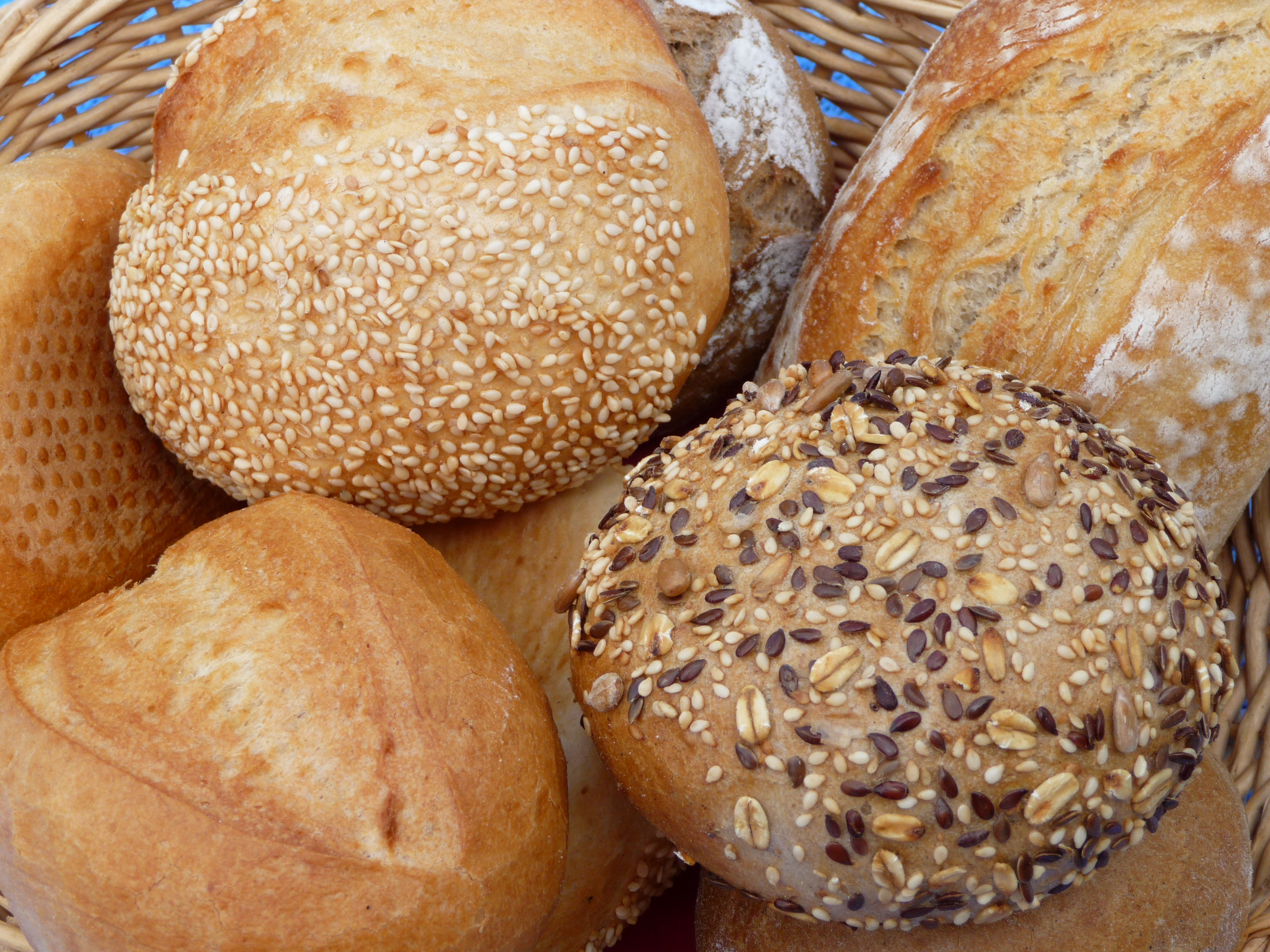
- Various leavened breads
- Main ingredients: Flour, water

Bread is a baked food product made from water, flour, and often yeast. It is a staple food across the world, particularly in Europe and the Middle East. Throughout recorded history and around the world, it has been an important part of many cultures' diets. It is one of the oldest human-made foods, having been of significance since the dawn of agriculture, and plays an essential role in both religious rituals and secular culture.

Bread may be leavened by naturally occurring microbes (e.g. sourdough), chemicals (e.g. baking soda), industrially produced yeast, or high-pressure aeration, which creates the gas bubbles that fluff up bread. Bread may also be unleavened. In many countries, mass-produced bread often contains additives to improve flavor, texture, color, shelf life, nutrition, and ease of production.

== Etymology ==
The word bread is a cognate of Old Norse and several other Germanic languages first used in English around year 1200. Its meaning was bit, crumb, or morsel. The Old English name was brēd n.(1) Also bræd, brad, bread, bried, bry(e)ad, brid, breid, breit.

== History ==
Bread is one of the oldest prepared foods. Evidence from 30,000 years ago in Europe and Australia revealed starch residue on rocks used for pounding plants. It is possible that during this time, starch extract from the roots of plants, such as cattails and ferns, was spread on a flat rock, placed over a fire and cooked into a primitive form of flatbread. The oldest evidence of bread-making has been found in a 14,500-year-old Natufian site in Jordan's northeastern desert. Around 10,000 BC, with the dawn of the Neolithic age and the spread of agriculture, grains became the mainstay of making bread. Yeast spores are ubiquitous, including on the surface of cereal grains, so any dough left to rest leavens naturally.

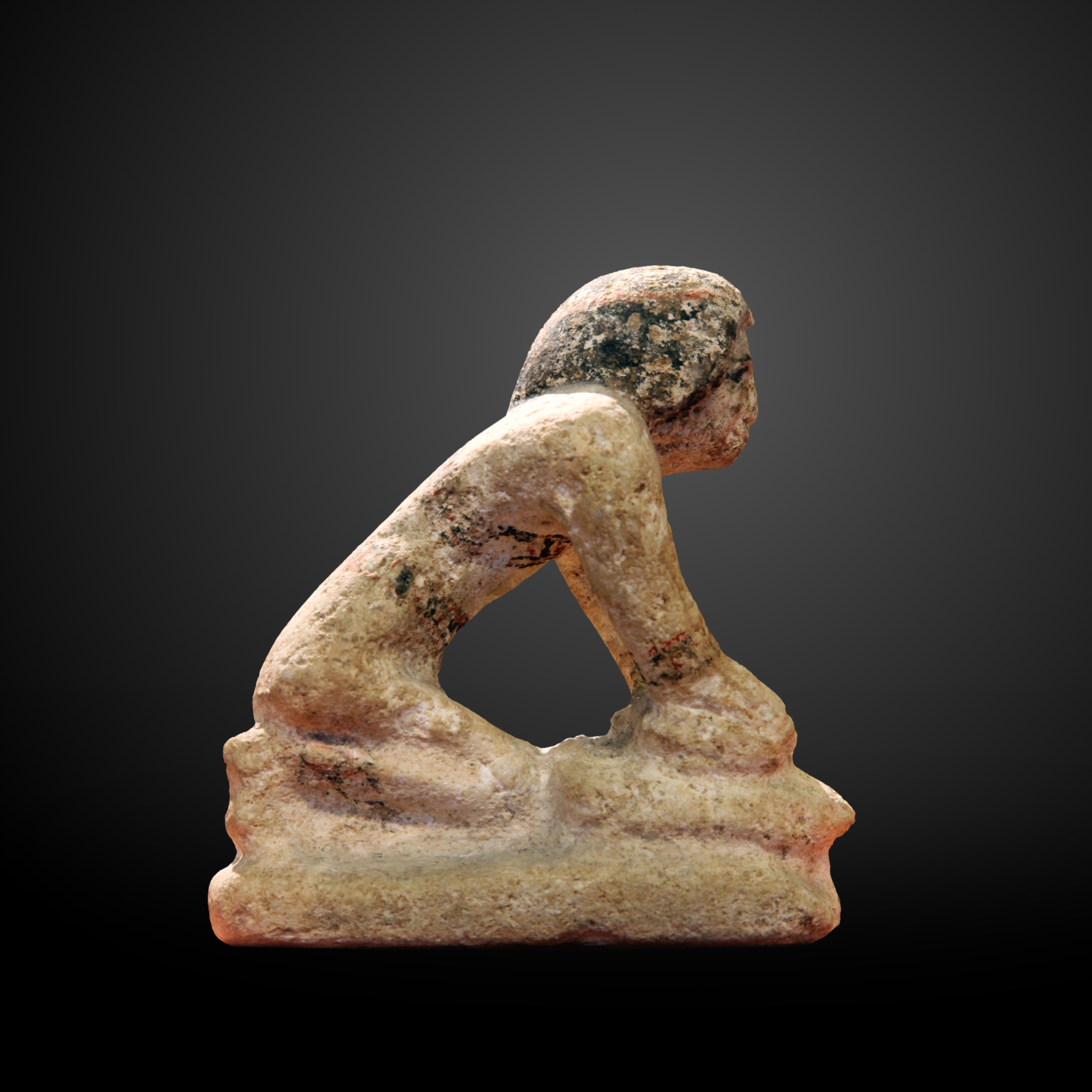
Woman baking bread (c. 2200 BC); Louvre

An early leavened bread was baked as early as 6000 BC in southern Mesopotamia, cradle of the Sumerian civilization, who may have passed on the knowledge to the Egyptians around 3000 BC. The Egyptians refined the process and started adding yeast to the flour. The Sumerians were already using ash to supplement the dough as it was baked.

There were multiple sources of leavening available for early bread. Airborne yeasts could be harnessed by leaving uncooked dough exposed to air for some time before cooking. Pliny the Elder reported that the Gauls and Iberians used the foam skimmed from beer, called barm, to produce "a lighter kind of bread than other peoples" such as barm cake. Parts of the ancient world that drank wine instead of beer used a paste composed of grape juice and flour that was allowed to begin fermenting, or wheat bran steeped in wine, as a source for yeast. The most common source of leavening was to retain a piece of dough from the previous day to use as a form of sourdough starter, as Pliny also reported.

The ancient Egyptians, Greeks, and Romans all considered the degree of refinement in the bakery arts as a sign of civilization.

The Chorleywood bread process was developed in 1961; it uses the intense mechanical working of dough to dramatically reduce the fermentation period and the time taken to produce a loaf. The process, whose high-energy mixing allows for the use of grain with a lower protein content, is now widely used around the world in large factories. As a result, bread can be produced very quickly and at low costs to the manufacturer and the consumer. However, there has been some criticism of the effect on nutritional value.

== Types ==
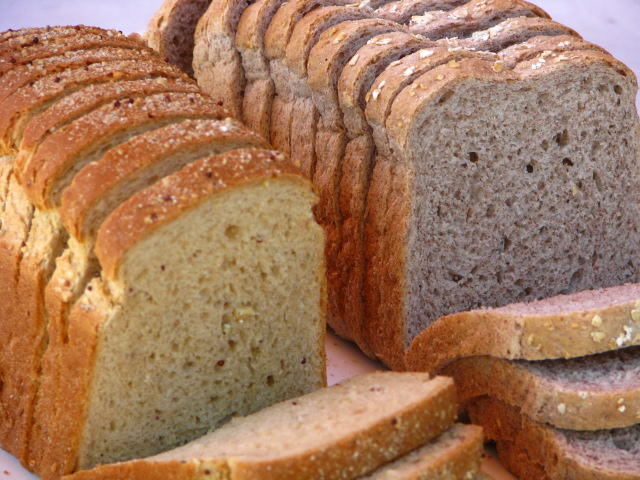
Brown bread (left) and whole grain bread

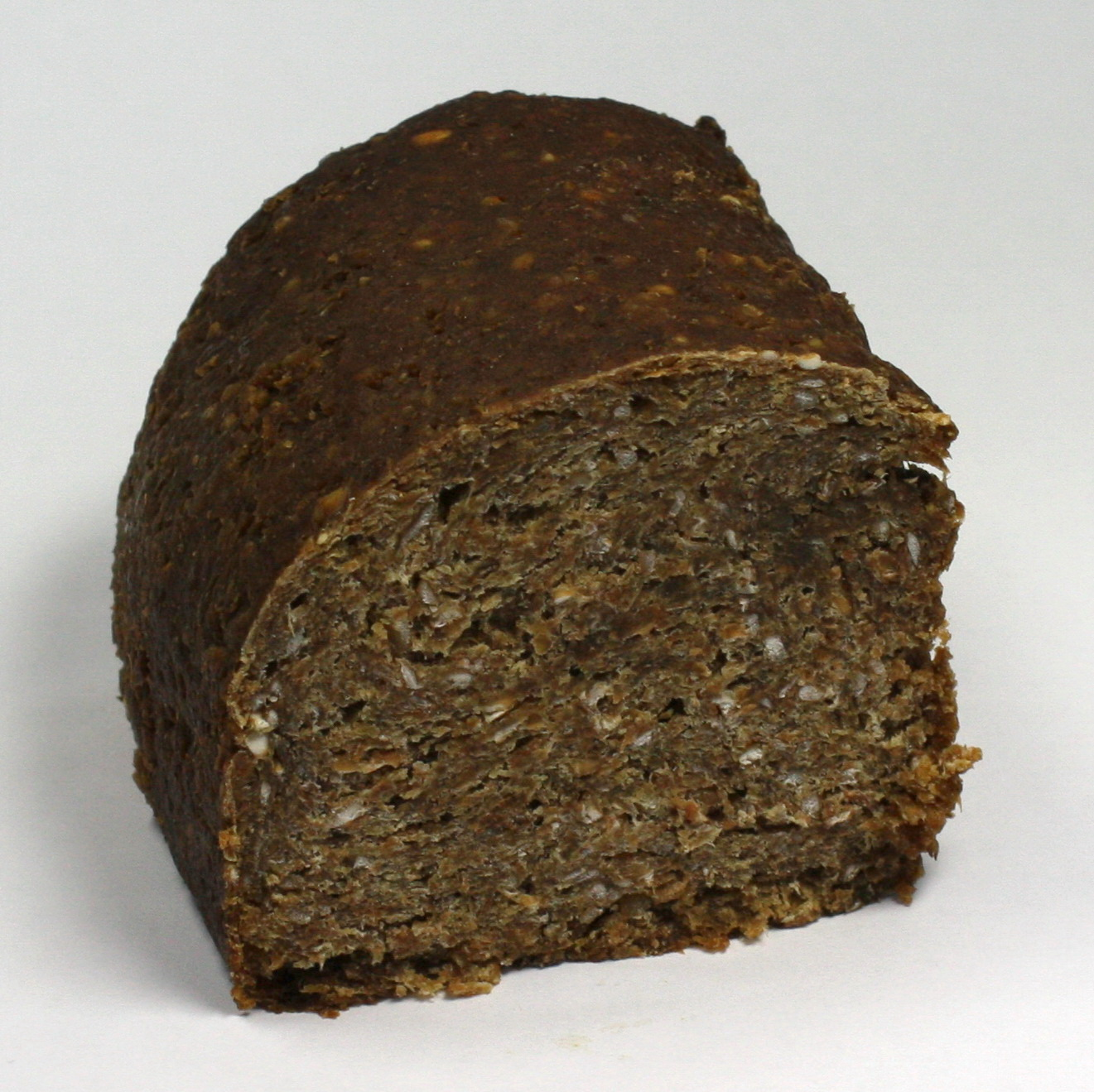
Dark sprouted bread

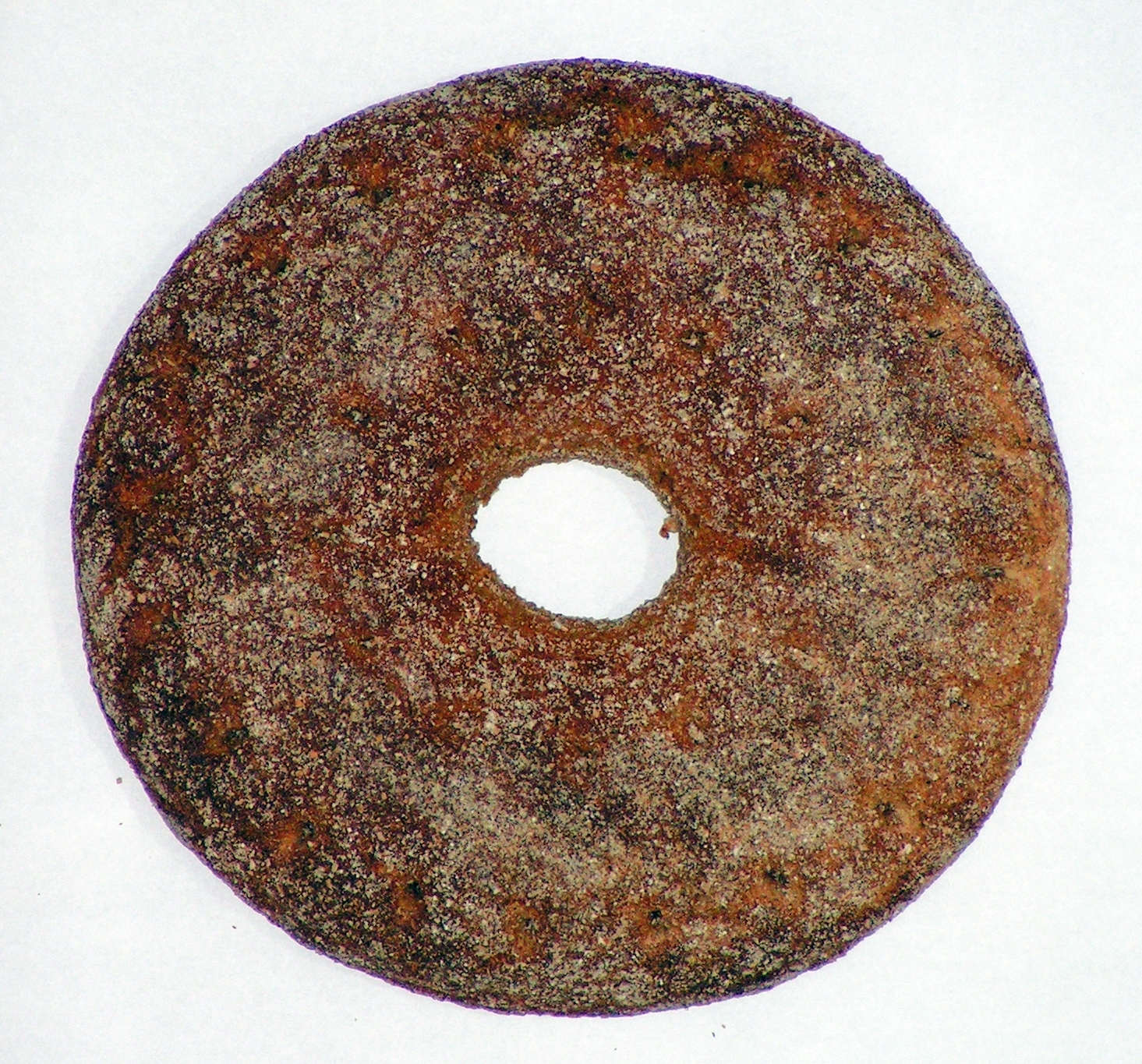
Ruisreikäleipä, a flat rye flour loaf with a hole

Bread is the staple food of the Middle East, Central Asia, North Africa, Europe, and in European-derived cultures such as those in the Americas, Australia, and Southern Africa. This is in contrast to parts of South and East Asia, where rice or noodles are the staple. Bread is usually made from a wheat-flour dough that is cultured with yeast, allowed to rise, and baked in an oven. Carbon dioxide and ethanol vapors produced during yeast fermentation result in bread's air pockets. Owing to its high levels of gluten (which give the dough sponginess and elasticity), common or bread wheat is the most common grain used for the preparation of bread, which makes the largest single contribution to the world's food supply of any food.

Bread is also made from the flour of other wheat species (including spelt, emmer, einkorn and kamut). Non-wheat cereals including rye, barley, maize (corn), oats, sorghum, millet and rice have been used to make bread, but, with the exception of rye, usually in combination with wheat flour as they have less gluten.

Gluten-free breads are made using flours from a variety of ingredients such as almonds, rice, sorghum, corn, legumes such as beans, and tubers such as cassava. Since these foods lack gluten, dough made from them may not hold its shape as the loaves rise, and their crumb may be dense with little aeration. Additives such as xanthan gum, guar gum, hydroxypropyl methylcellulose (HPMC), corn starch, or eggs are used to compensate for the lack of gluten.

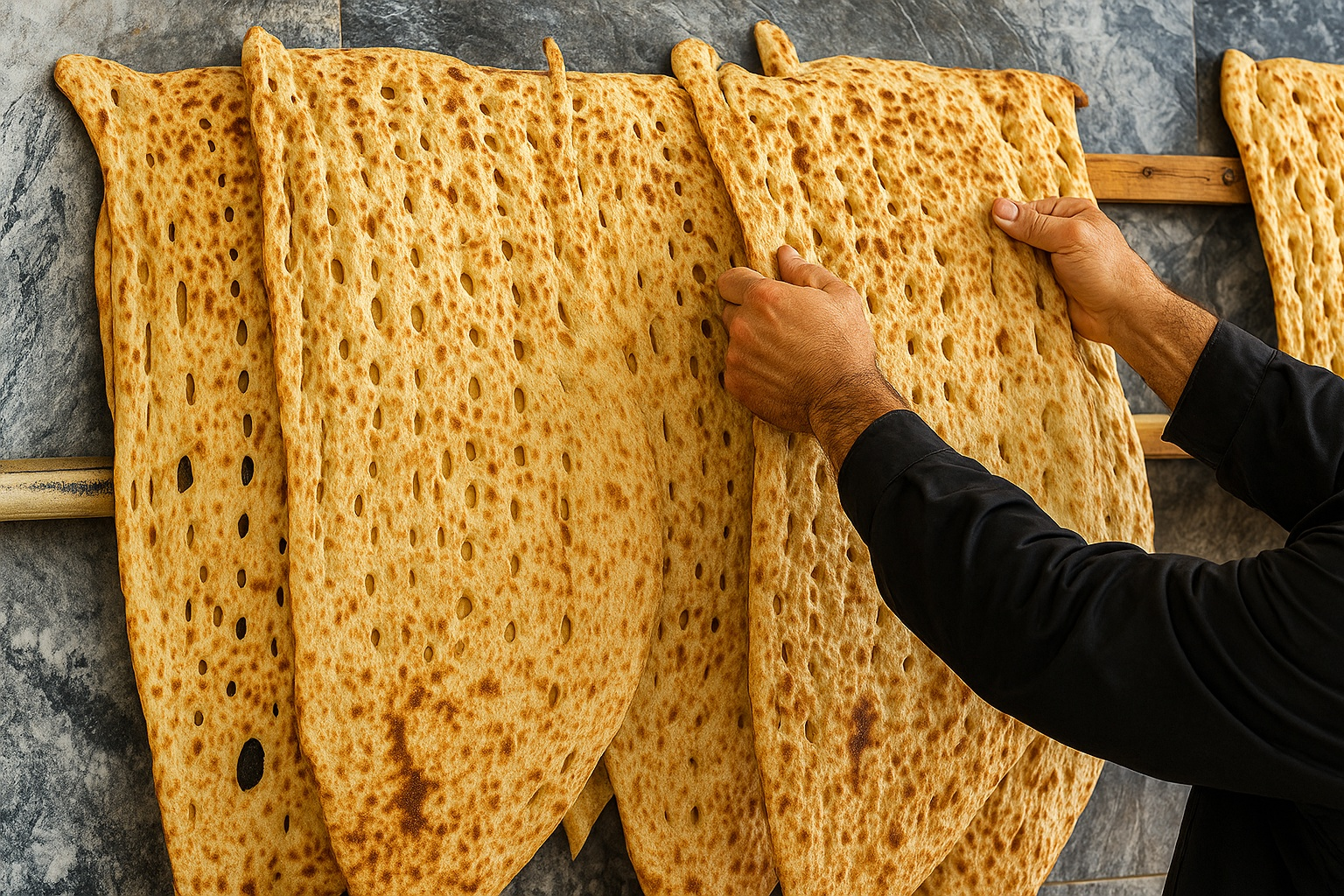
Sangak, an Iranian flatbread

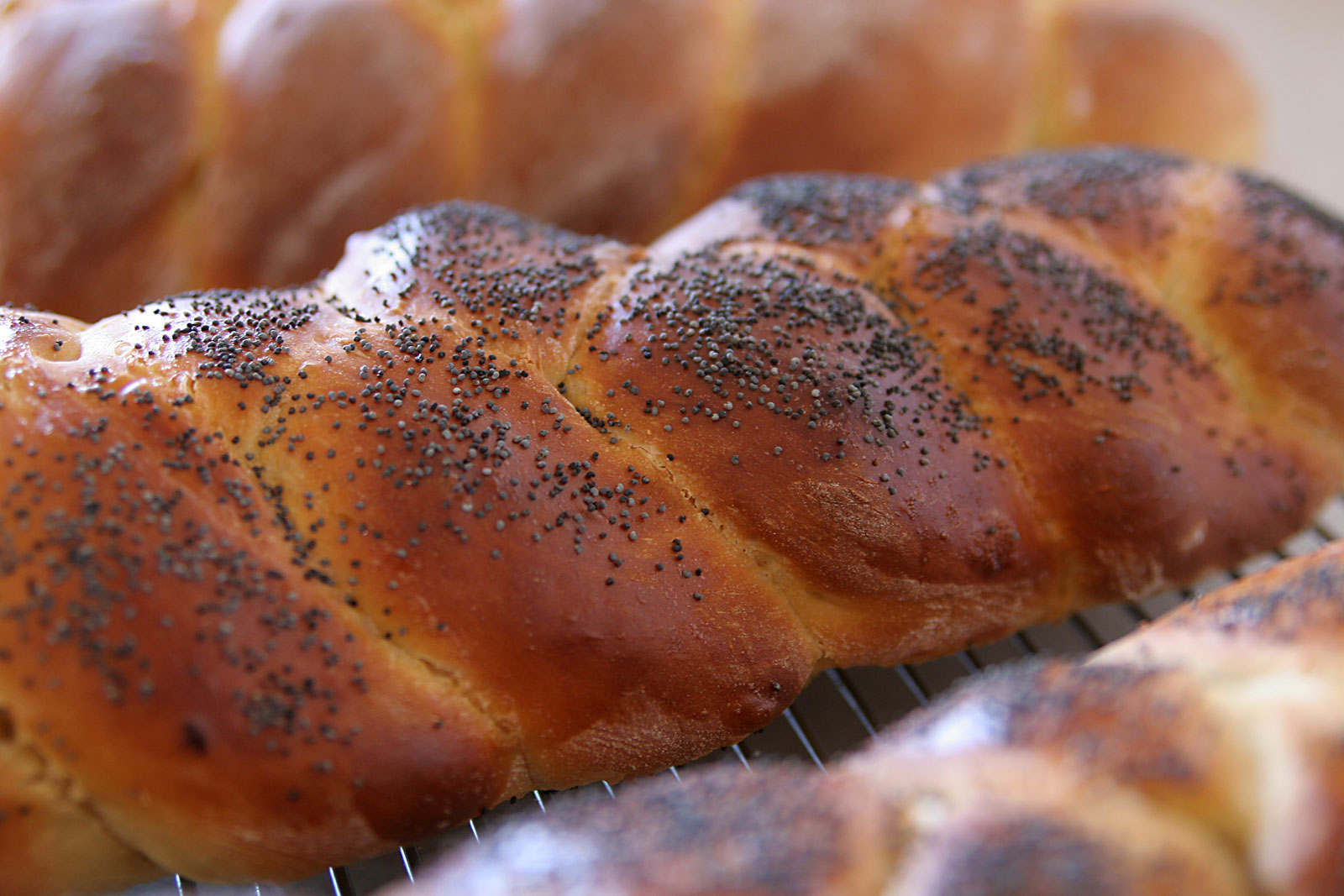
Strucla, a type of European sweet bread

== Properties ==
=== Physical-chemical composition ===
In wheat, phenolic compounds are mainly found in hulls in the form of insoluble bound ferulic acid, where it is relevant to wheat resistance to fungal diseases.

Rye bread contains phenolic acids and ferulic acid dehydrodimers.

Three natural phenolic glucosides, secoisolariciresinol diglucoside, p-coumaric acid glucoside and ferulic acid glucoside, can be found in commercial breads containing flaxseed.

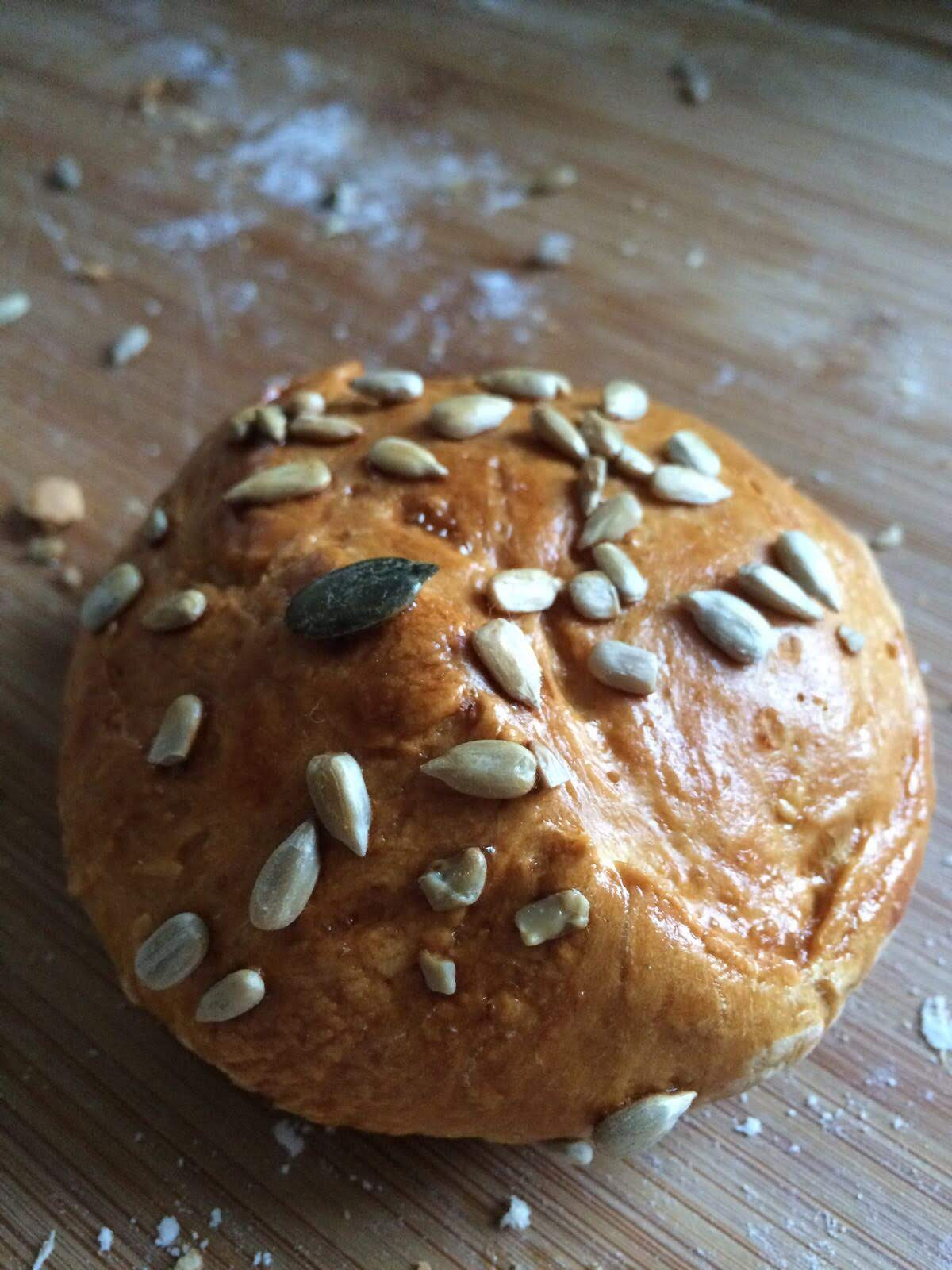
Small homemade bread with pumpkin and sunflower seeds

Glutenin and gliadin are functional proteins found in wheat bread that contribute to the structure of bread. Glutenin forms interconnected gluten networks within bread through interchain disulfide bonds. Gliadin binds weakly to the gluten network established by glutenin via intrachain disulfide bonds. Structurally, bread can be defined as an elastic-plastic foam (same as styrofoam). The glutenin protein contributes to its elastic nature, as it is able to regain its initial shape after deformation. The gliadin protein contributes to its plastic nature, because it demonstrates non-reversible structural change after a certain amount of applied force. Because air pockets within this gluten network result from carbon dioxide production during leavening, bread can be defined as a foam, or a gas-in-solid solution.

Acrylamide, like in other starchy foods that have been heated higher than 120 °C (248 °F), has been found in recent years to occur in bread. Acrylamide is neurotoxic, has adverse effects on male reproduction and developmental toxicity and is carcinogenic. A study has found that more than 99 percent of the acrylamide in bread is found in the crust.

A study by the University of Hohenheim found that industrially produced bread typically has a high proportion of FODMAP carbohydrates due to a short rising time (often only one hour). The high proportion of FODMAP carbohydrates in such bread then causes flatulence. This is particularly problematic in intestinal diseases such as irritable bowel syndrome. While in traditional bread making the dough rises for several hours, industrial breads rise for a much shorter time, usually only one hour. However, a sufficiently long rising time is important to break down the indigestible FODMAP carbohydrates. Some flours (for example, spelt, emmer and einkorn) contain fewer FODMAPs, but the difference between grain types is relatively small (between 1 and 2 percent by weight). Instead, 90% of the FODMAPs that cause discomfort can be broken down during a rising time of four hours. In the study, whole-grain yeast doughs were examined after different rising times; the highest level of FODMAPs was present after one hour in each case and decreased thereafter. The study thus shows that it is essentially the baking technique and not the type of grain that determines whether a bread is well tolerated or not. A better tolerance of bread made from original cereals can therefore not be explained by the original cereal itself, but rather by the fact that traditional, artisanal baking techniques are generally used when baking original cereals, which include a long dough process. The study also showed that a long rising time also breaks down undesirable phytates more effectively, flavors develop better, and the finished bread contains more biologically accessible trace elements.

=== Culinary uses ===
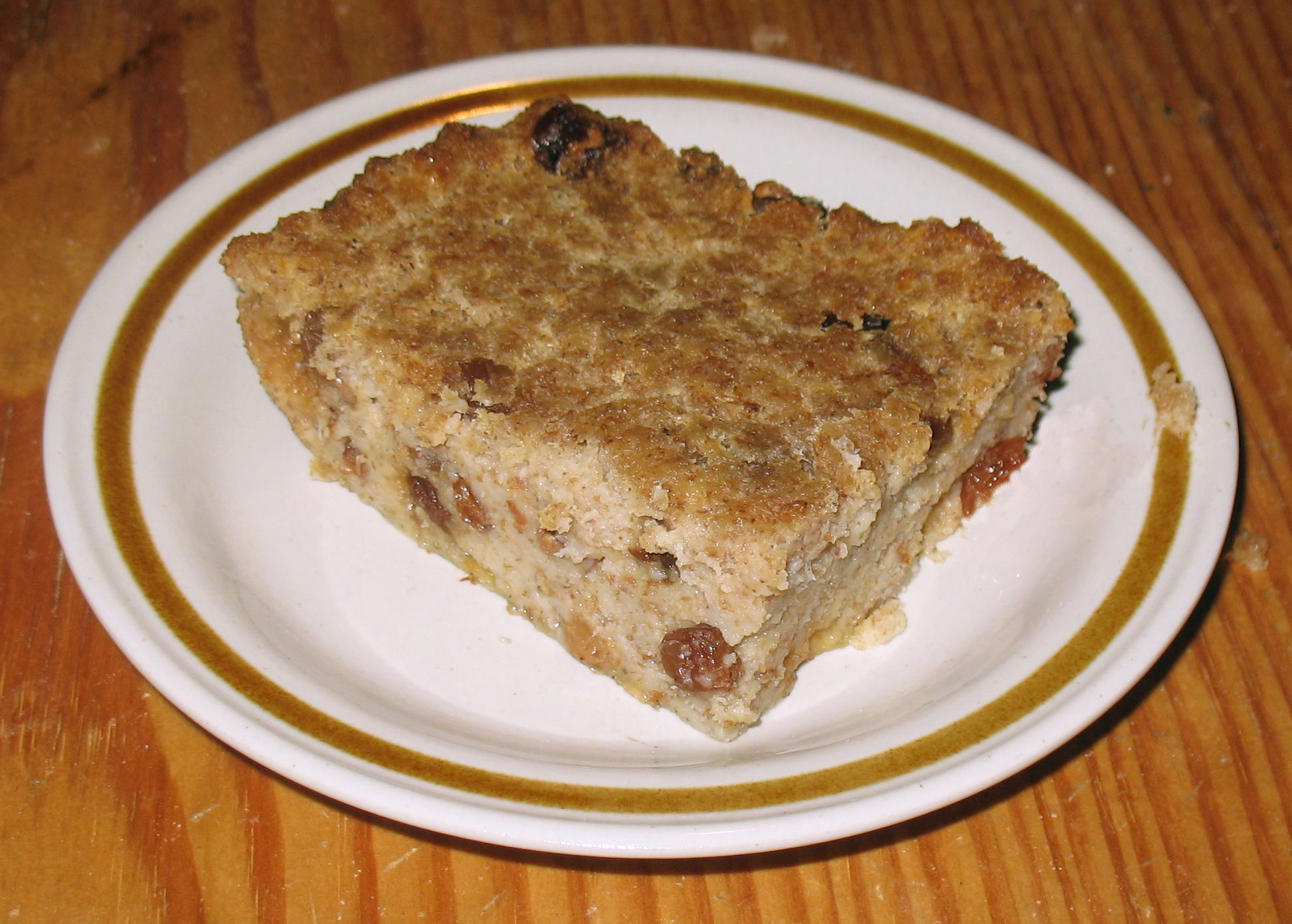
Bread pudding

Bread can be served at many temperatures; once baked, it can subsequently be toasted. It is most commonly eaten with the hands, either by itself or as a carrier for other foods. Bread can be spread with butter, dipped into liquids such as gravy, olive oil, or soup; it can be topped with various sweet and savory spreads, or used to make sandwiches containing meats, cheeses, vegetables, and condiments.

Bread is used as an ingredient in other culinary preparations, such as the use of breadcrumbs to provide crunchy crusts or thicken sauces; toasted cubes of bread, called croutons, are used as a salad topping; seasoned bread is used as stuffing inside roasted turkey; sweet or savoury bread puddings are made with bread and various liquids; egg and milk-soaked bread is fried as French toast; and bread is used as a binding agent in sausages, meatballs and other ground meat products.

=== Nutritional significance ===
Bread is a good source of carbohydrates. Breads made from refined flour are often poor in dietary fiber and micronutrients, but are commonly fortified. Whole grain bread is a good source of dietary fiber and micronutrients such as magnesium, iron, selenium, and B vitamins. All breads are a common source of protein in the diet, though not a rich one.

=== Crust and crumb ===
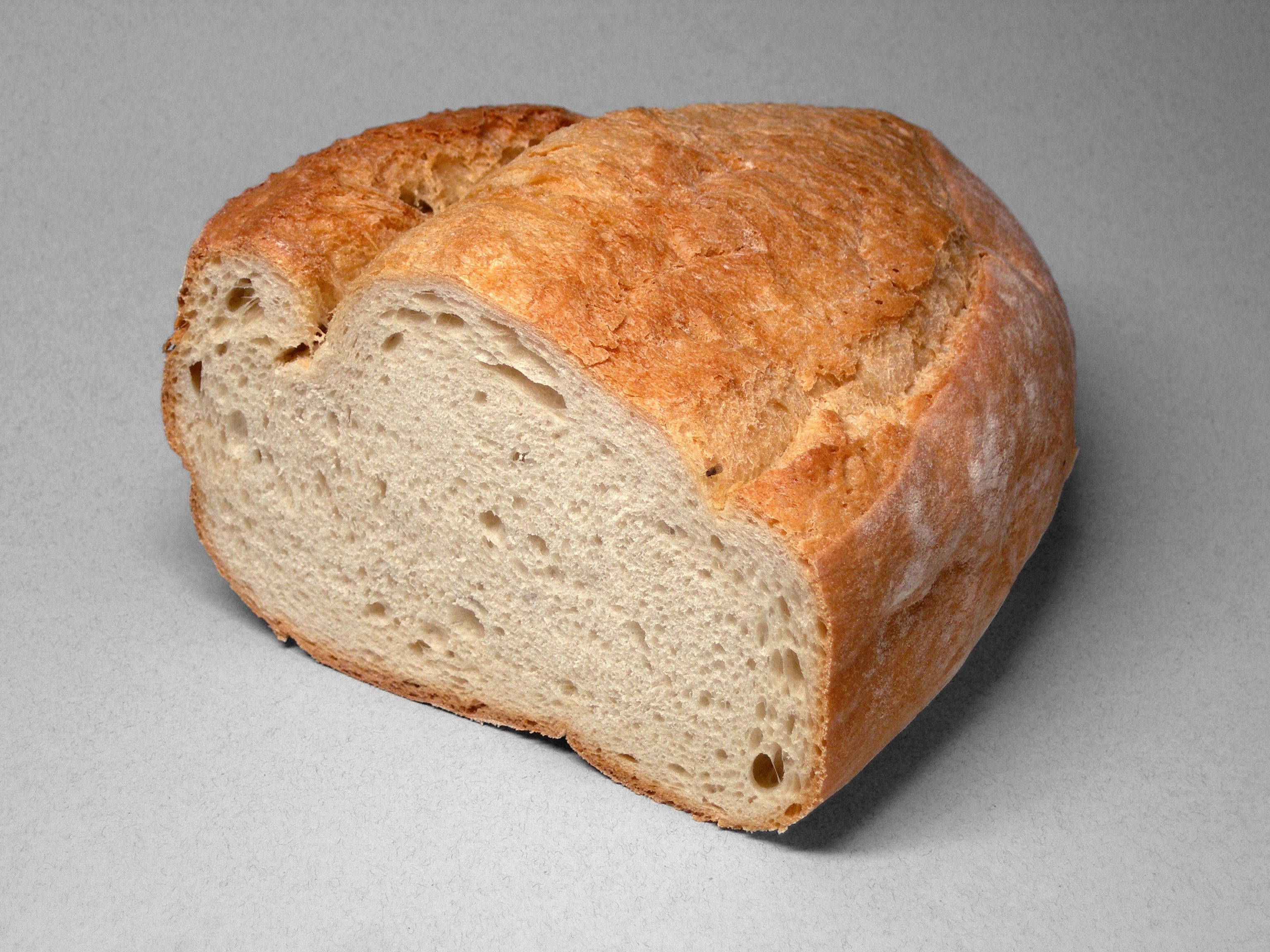
Bread with crust crack (half left at the top) and (lighter) crumb inside

The mass of bread consists of two primary components: the crust and crumb.

Bread crust is formed from surface dough during the cooking process. It is hardened and browned through the Maillard reaction using the sugars and amino acids due to the intense heat at the bread surface. The crust of most breads is harder, and more complexly and intensely flavored, than the rest. Old wives' tales suggest that eating the bread crust makes a person's hair curlier. Additionally, the crust is rumored to be healthier than the remainder of the bread. Some studies have shown that this is true as the crust has more dietary fiber and antioxidants such as pronyl-lysine.

Bread crumb is the internal porous material consisting of bubbles with elastic walls. As the bread ages (becomes stale), the crumb becomes more firm.

== Preparation ==
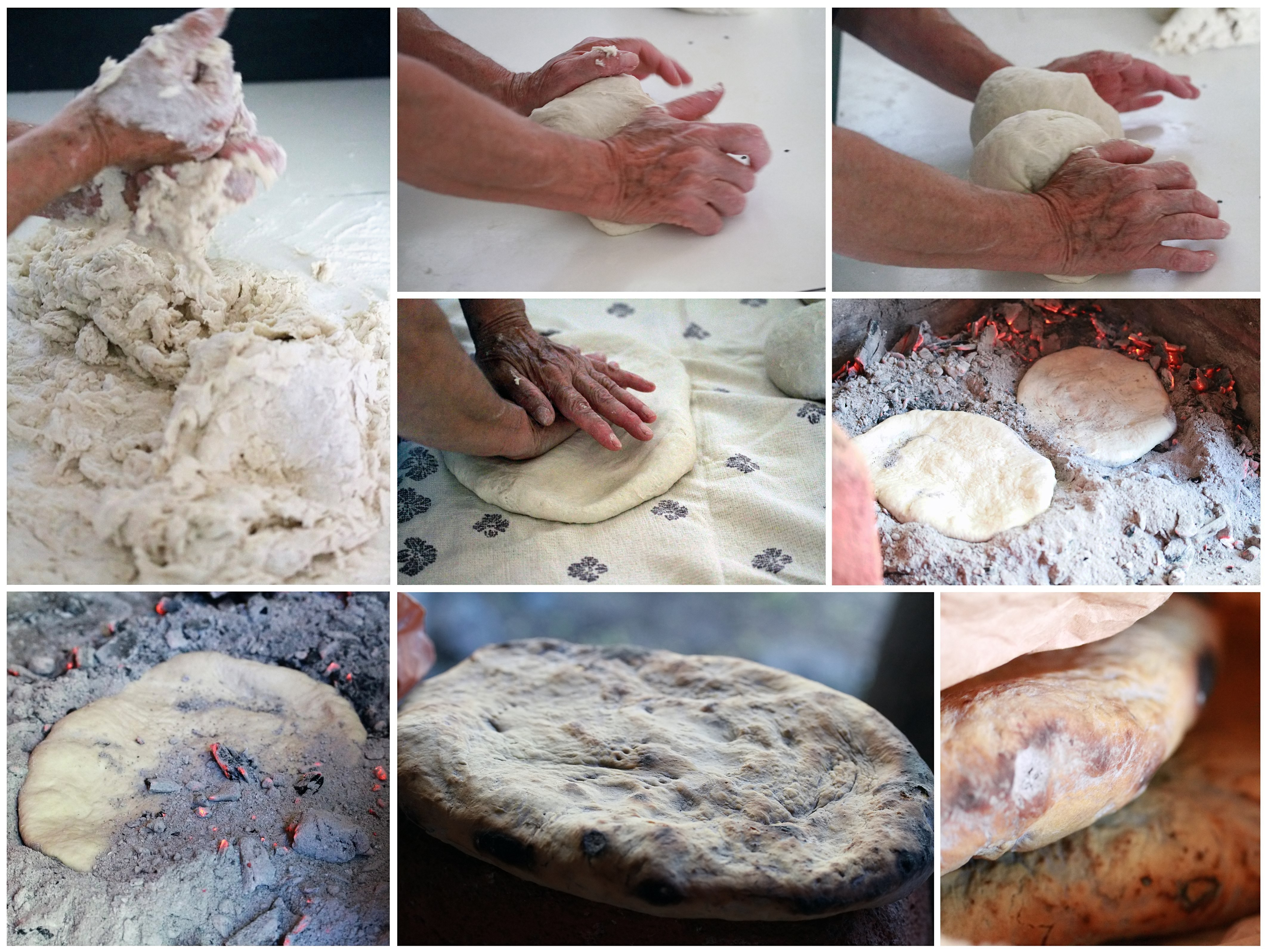
Steps in bread making, here for an unleavened Chilean tortilla

Doughs are usually baked, but in some cuisines breads are steamed (e.g., mantou), fried (e.g., puri), or baked on an unoiled frying pan (e.g., tortillas). It may be leavened or unleavened (e.g. matzo). Salt, fat and leavening agents such as yeast and baking soda are common ingredients, though bread may contain other ingredients, such as milk, egg, sugar, spice, fruit (such as raisins), vegetables (such as onion), nuts (such as walnut) or seeds (such as poppy).

Methods of processing dough into bread include the straight dough process, the sourdough process, the Chorleywood bread process and the sponge and dough process.

=== Formulation ===
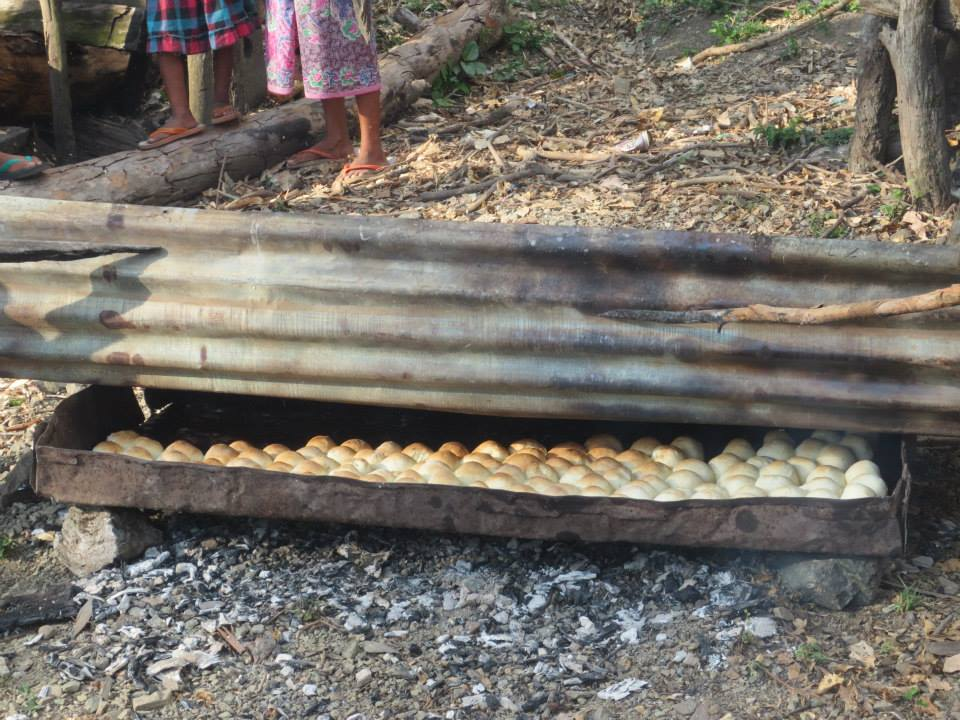
Baking bread in East Timor

Professional bread recipes are stated using the baker's percentage notation. The amount of flour is denoted to be 100%, and the other ingredients are expressed as a percentage of that amount by weight. Measurement by weight is more accurate and consistent than measurement by volume, particularly for dry ingredients. The proportion of water to flour is the most important measurement in a bread recipe, as it affects texture and crumb the most. Hard wheat flours absorb about 62% water, while softer wheat flours absorb about 56%. Common table breads made from these doughs result in a finely textured, light bread. Most artisan bread formulas contain anywhere from 60 to 75% water. In yeast breads, the higher water percentages result in more CO_{2} bubbles and a coarser crumb.

Dough recipes commonly call for 500 grams (about 1.1 pounds) of flour, which yields a single loaf of bread or two baguettes.

Calcium propanoate is commonly added by commercial bakeries to retard the growth of molds.

=== Flour ===
Flour is grain ground into a powder. Flour provides the primary structure, starch and protein to the final baked bread. The protein content of the flour is the best indicator of the quality of the bread dough and the finished bread. While bread can be made from all-purpose wheat flour, a specialty bread flour, containing more protein (12–14%), is recommended for high-quality bread. If one uses a flour with a lower protein content (9–11%) to produce bread, a shorter mixing time is required to develop gluten strength properly. An extended mixing time leads to oxidization of the dough, which gives the finished product a whiter crumb, instead of the cream color preferred by most artisan bakers.

Wheat flour, in addition to its starch, contains three water-soluble protein groups (albumin, globulin, and proteoses) and two water-insoluble protein groups (glutenin and gliadin). When flour is mixed with water, the water-soluble proteins dissolve, leaving the glutenin and gliadin to form the structure of the resulting bread. When relatively dry dough is worked by kneading, or wet dough is allowed to rise for a long time (see no-knead bread), the glutenin forms strands of long, thin, chainlike molecules, while the shorter gliadin forms bridges between the strands of glutenin. The resulting networks of strands produced by these two proteins are known as gluten. Gluten development improves if the dough is allowed to autolyse.

==== Fortification ====
Processing of flours usually involves removal of the outer layers, which contain important nutrients. Such flours, and bread made from them, may be fortified by adding nutrients. Fortification with added calcium, iron, thiamine (Vitamin B1) and niacin (Vitamin B3) is a legal requirement in the UK (wholemeal flours, from which the nutrients have not been stripped, are exempt). The unregulated term "wheatmeal" is used to describe flour containing some but not all of the outer covering and central part of the wheat grain.

=== Liquids ===
Water, or some other liquid, is used to form the flour into a paste or dough. The weight or ratio of liquid required varies between recipes, but a ratio of three parts liquid to five parts flour is common for yeast breads. Recipes that use steam as the primary leavening method may have a liquid content in excess of one part liquid to one part flour. Instead of water, recipes may use liquids such as milk or other dairy products (including buttermilk or yogurt), fruit juice, or eggs. These contribute additional sweeteners, fats, or leavening components, as well as water.

=== Fats or shortenings ===
Fats, such as butter, vegetable oils, lard, or that contained in eggs, affect the development of gluten in breads by coating and lubricating the individual strands of protein. They also help to hold the structure together. If too much fat is included in a bread dough, the lubrication effect causes the protein structures to divide. A fat content of approximately 3% by weight is the concentration that produces the greatest leavening action.

=== Bread improvers ===
Bread improvers and dough conditioners are often used in producing commercial breads to reduce the time needed for rising and to improve texture and volume and to give antistaling effects. The substances used may be oxidising agents to strengthen the dough or reducing agents to develop gluten and reduce mixing time, emulsifiers to strengthen the dough or to provide other properties such as making slicing easier, or enzymes to increase gas production.

=== Salt ===
Salt (sodium chloride) is very often added to enhance flavor and restrict yeast activity. It also affects the crumb and the overall texture by stabilizing and strengthening the gluten. Some artisan bakers forego early addition of salt to the dough, whether wholemeal or refined, and wait until after a 20-minute rest to allow the dough to autolyse.

Mixtures of salts are sometimes employed, such as employing potassium chloride to reduce the sodium level, and monosodium glutamate to give flavor (umami).

== Leavening ==
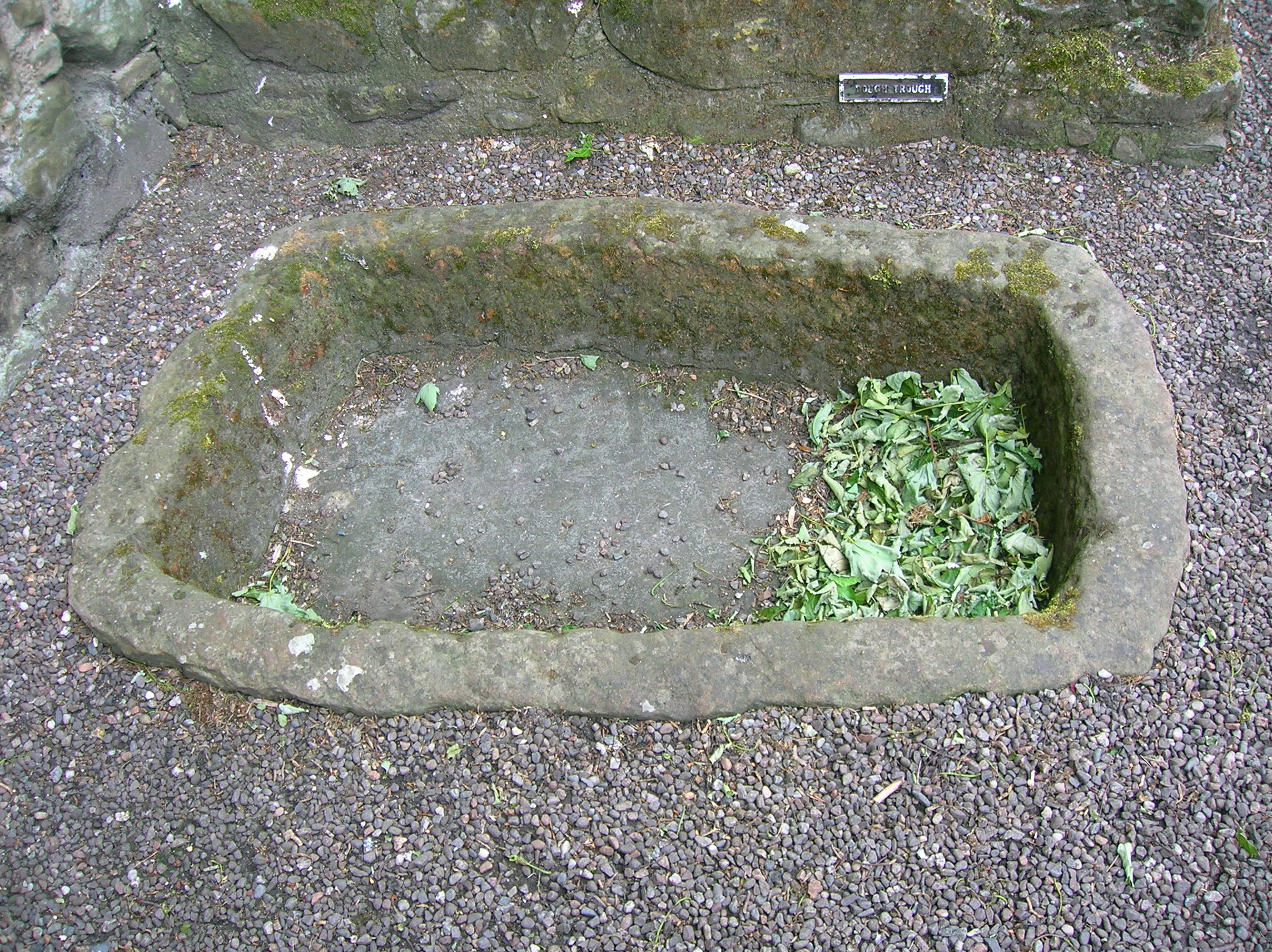
A dough trough, located in Aberdour Castle, once used for leavening bread

Leavening is the process of adding gas to a dough before or during baking to produce a lighter, more easily chewed bread. Most bread eaten in the West is leavened.

=== Chemicals ===
A simple technique for leavening bread is the use of gas-producing chemicals. There are two common methods. The first is to use baking powder or a self-raising flour that includes baking powder. The second is to include an acidic ingredient such as buttermilk and add baking soda; the reaction of the acid with the soda produces gas. Chemically leavened breads are called quick breads and soda breads. This method is commonly used to make muffins, pancakes, American-style biscuits, and quick breads such as banana bread.

=== Yeast ===
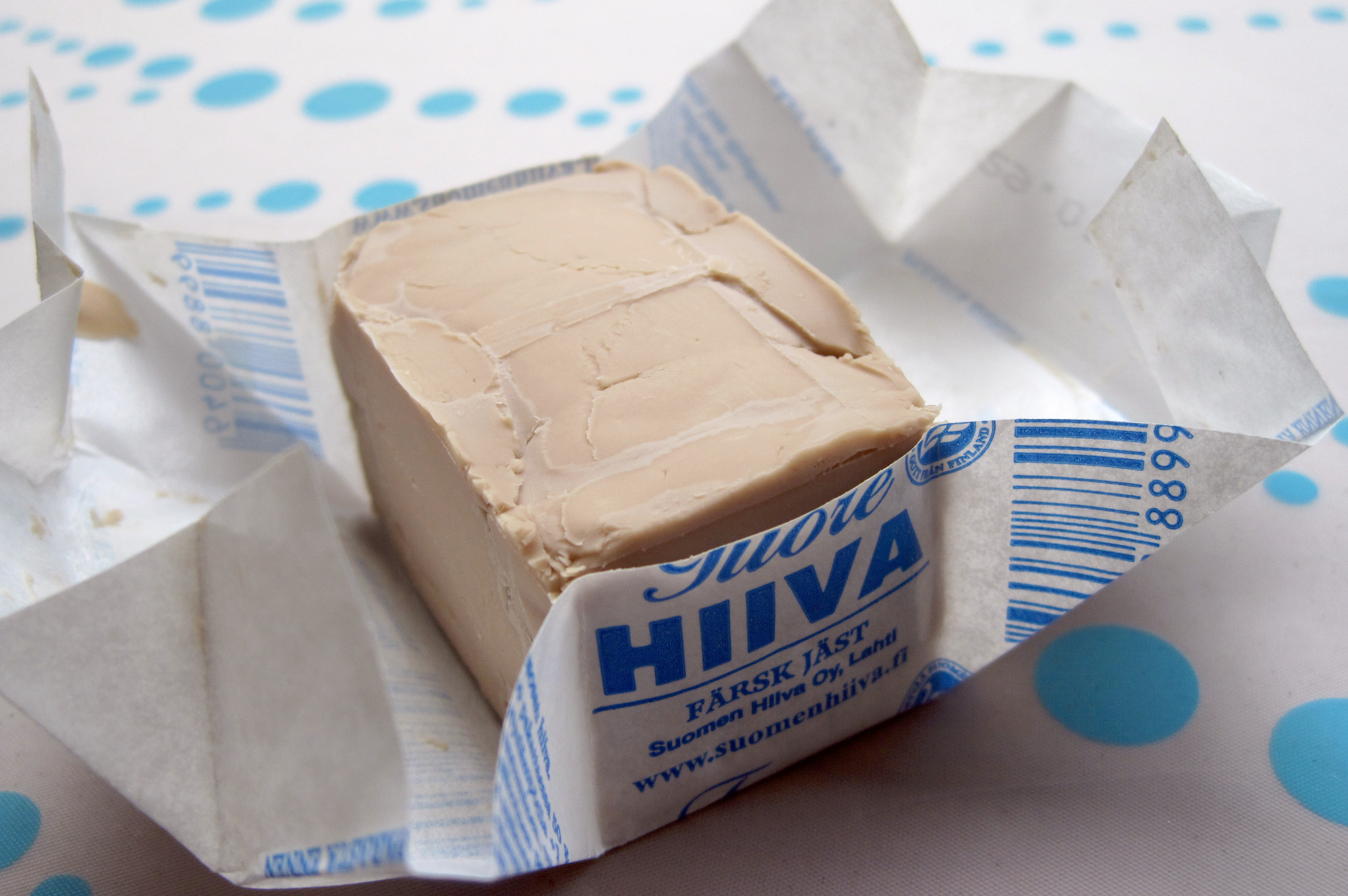
Compressed fresh yeast

Many breads are leavened by yeast. The yeast most commonly used for leavening bread is Saccharomyces cerevisiae, the same species used for brewing cereal-based alcoholic beverages. This yeast ferments some of the sugars producing carbon dioxide. Commercial bakers often leaven their dough with commercially produced baker's yeast. Baker's yeast has the advantage of producing uniform, quick, and reliable results, because it is obtained from a pure culture. Many artisan bakers produce their own yeast with a growth culture. If kept in the right conditions, it provides leavening for many years.

The baker's yeast and sourdough methods follow the same pattern. Water is mixed with flour, salt and the leavening agent. Other additions (spices, herbs, fats, seeds, fruit, etc.) are not needed to bake bread, but are often used. The mixed dough is then allowed to rise one or more times (a longer rising time results in more flavor, so bakers often "punch down" the dough and let it rise again), loaves are formed, and (after an optional final rising time) the bread is baked in an oven.

Many breads are made from a "straight dough", which means that all of the ingredients are combined in one step, and the dough is baked after the rising time; others are made from a "pre-ferment" in which the leavening agent is combined with some of the flour and water a day or so ahead of baking and allowed to ferment overnight. On the day of baking, the rest of the ingredients are added, and the process continues as with straight dough. This produces a more flavorful bread with better texture. Many bakers see the starter method as a compromise between the reliable results of baker's yeast and the flavor and complexity of a longer fermentation. It also allows the baker to use only a minimal amount of baker's yeast, which was scarce and expensive when it first became available. Most yeasted pre-ferments fall into one of three categories: "poolish" or "pouliche", a loose-textured mixture composed of roughly equal amounts of flour and water (by weight); "biga", a stiff mixture with a higher proportion of flour; and "pâte fermentée", which is a portion of dough reserved from a previous batch.

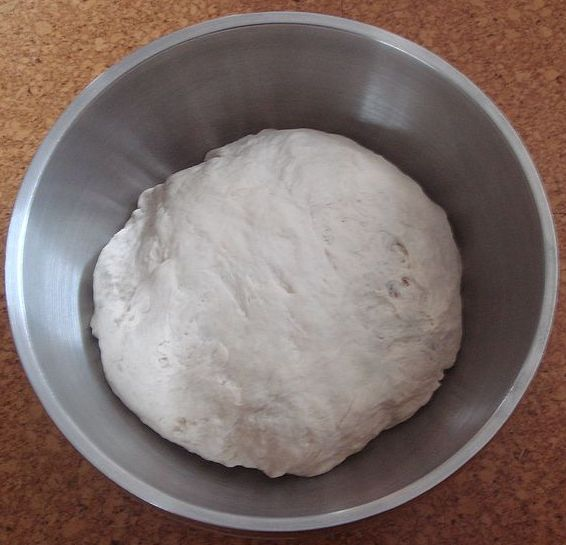
Before first rising

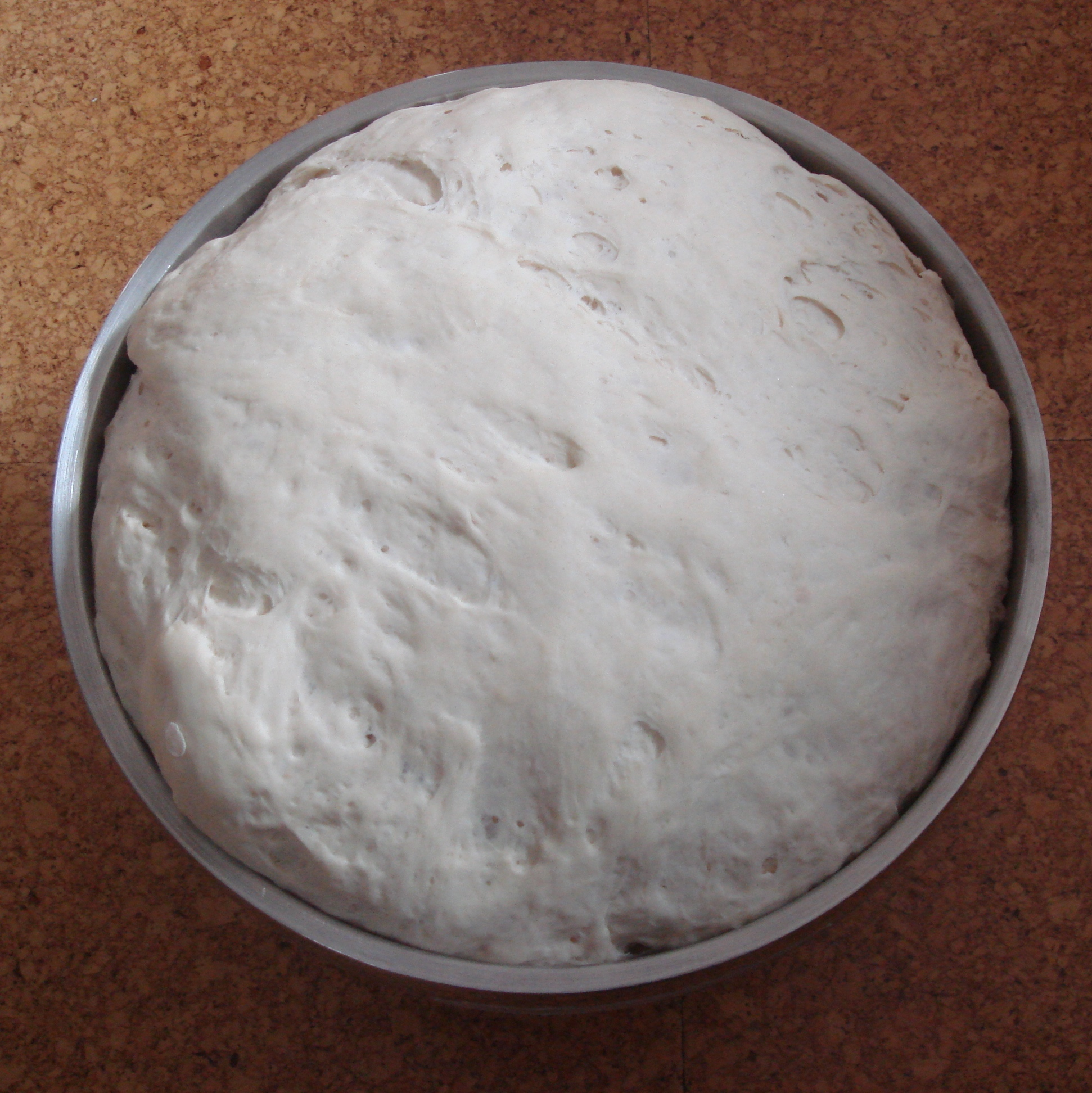
After first rising

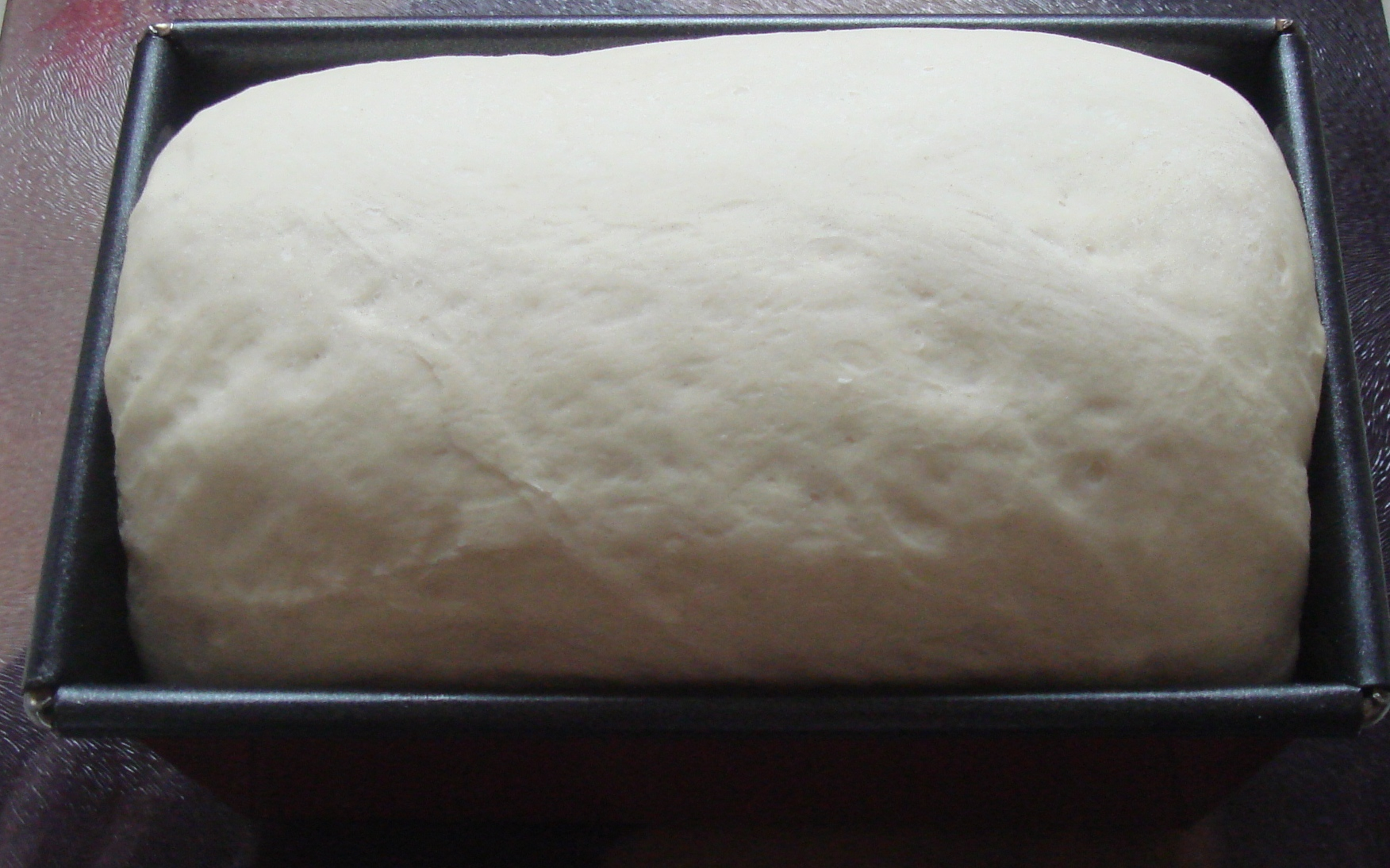
After proofing, ready to bake

=== Sourdough ===
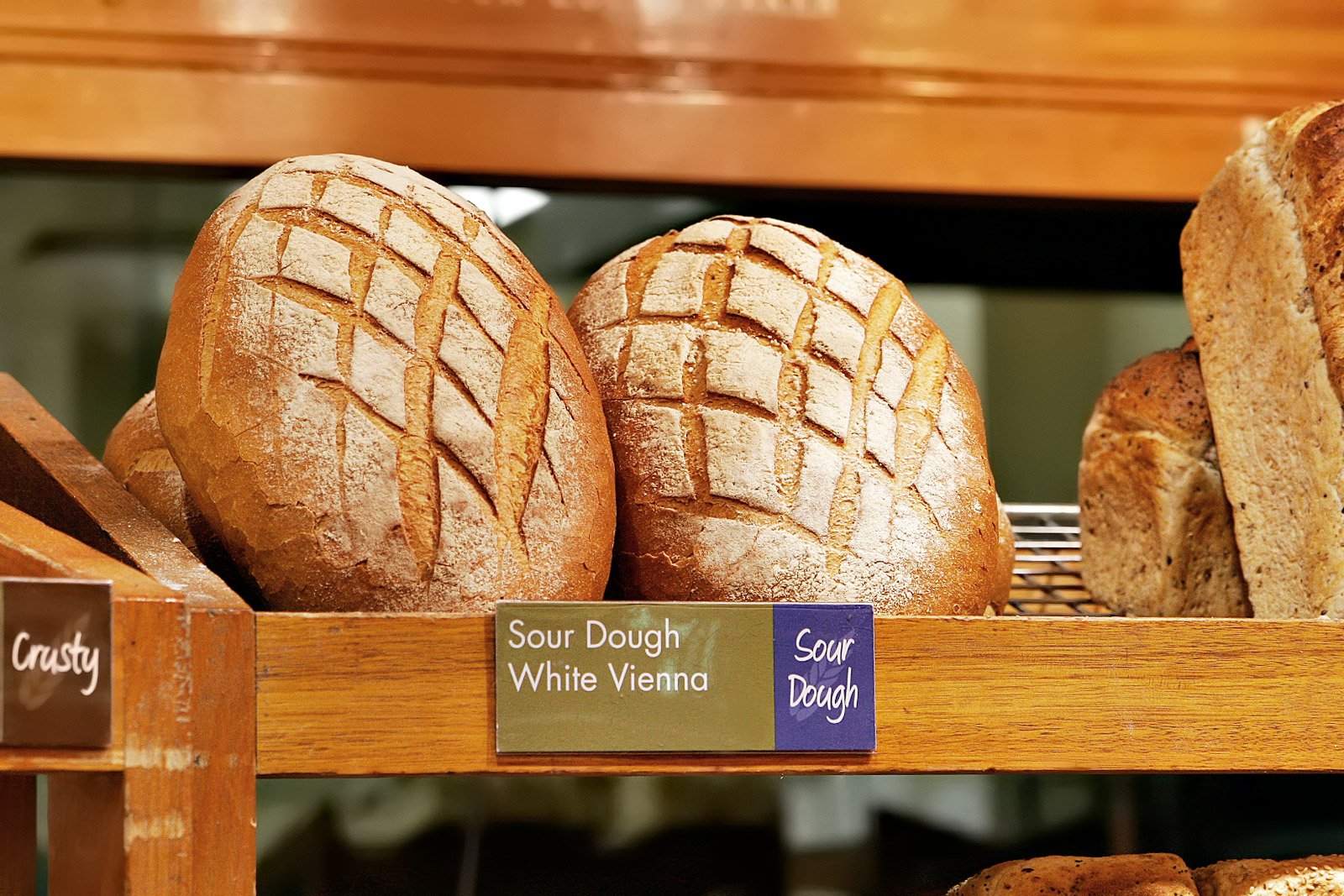
Sourdough loaves

Sourdough is a type of bread produced by a long fermentation of dough using naturally occurring yeasts and lactobacilli. It usually has a mildly sour taste because of the lactic acid produced during anaerobic fermentation by the lactobacilli. Longer fermented sourdoughs can also contain acetic acid, the main non-water component of vinegar.

Sourdough breads are made with a sourdough starter. The starter cultivates wild yeast and lactobacilli in a mixture of flour and water, making use of the microorganisms naturally present on the flour, and does not require any added commercial yeast. A starter may be maintained indefinitely by regular additions of flour and water. Some bakers have starters many generations old, which are said to have a special taste or texture. At one time, all yeast-leavened breads were sourdoughs. Recently there has been a revival of sourdough bread in artisan bakeries.

Traditionally, peasant families throughout Europe baked on a fixed schedule, perhaps once a week. The starter was saved from the previous week's dough. The starter was mixed with the new ingredients, the dough was left to rise, and then a piece of it was saved to be the starter for next week's bread.

=== Steam ===
The rapid expansion of steam produced during baking leavens the bread, which is as simple as it is unpredictable. Steam-leavening is unpredictable since the steam is not produced until the bread is baked. Steam leavening happens regardless of the raising agents (baking soda, yeast, baking powder, sour dough, beaten egg white) included in the mix. The leavening agent either contains air bubbles or generates carbon dioxide. The heat vaporises the water from the inner surface of the bubbles within the dough. The steam expands and makes the bread rise. This is the main factor in the rising of bread once it has been put in the oven. CO_{2} generation, on its own, is too small to account for the rise. Heat kills bacteria or yeast at an early stage, so the CO_{2} generation is stopped.

=== Bacteria ===
Salt-rising bread does not use yeast. Instead, it is leavened by Clostridium perfringens, one of the most common sources of food-borne illness.

=== Aeration ===
Aerated bread is leavened by carbon dioxide being forced into dough under pressure. From the mid-19th to mid-20th centuries, bread made this way was somewhat popular in the United Kingdom, made by the Aerated Bread Company and sold in its high-street tearooms. The company was founded in 1862, and ceased independent operations in 1955.

The Pressure-Vacuum mixer was later developed by the Flour Milling and Baking Research Association for the Chorleywood bread process. It manipulates the gas bubble size and optionally the composition of gases in the dough via the gas applied to the headspace.

== Cultural significance ==
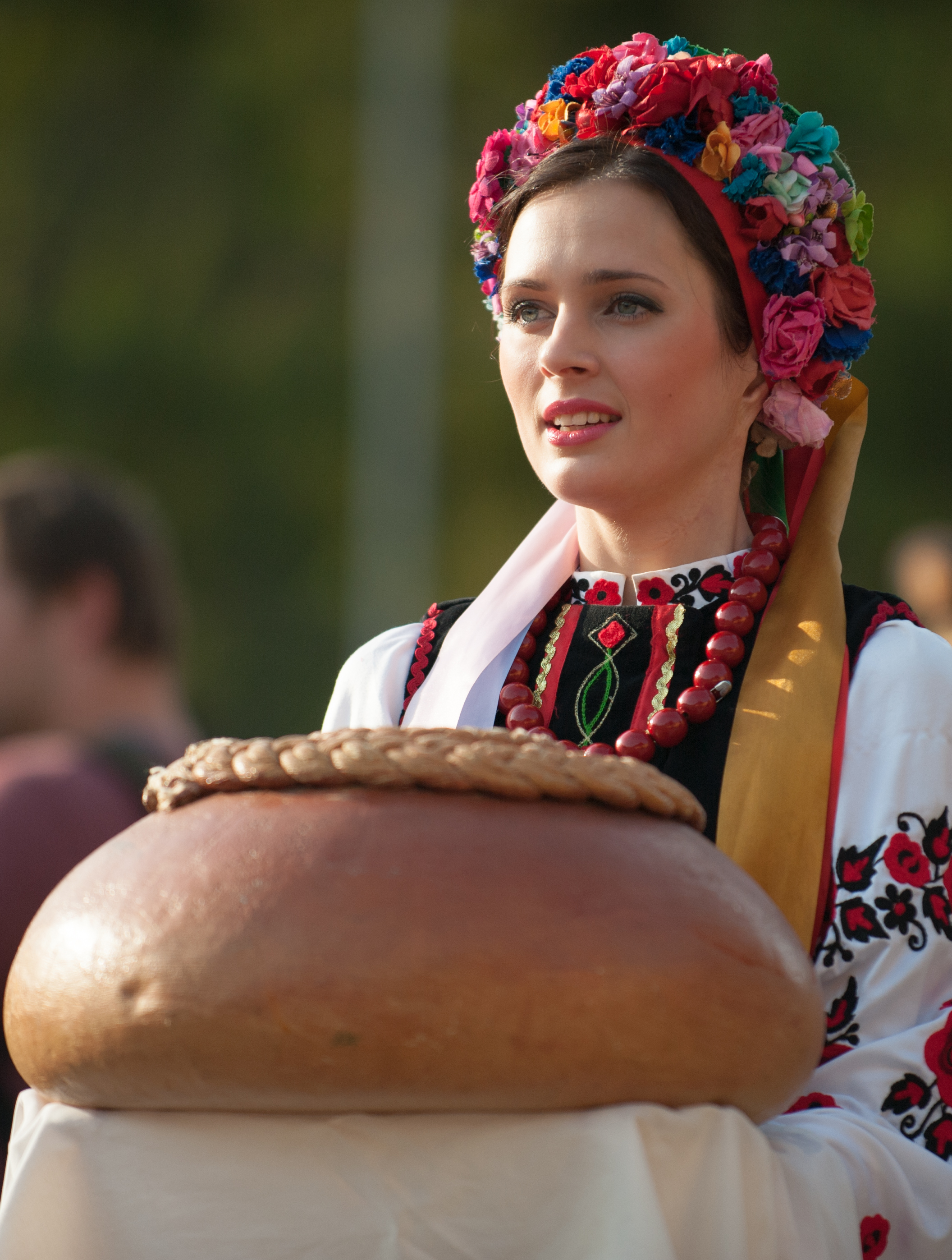
A Ukrainian woman in national dress welcoming with bread and salt

Bread plays an important role in many cultures because of its historical role and contemporary importance. Bread is also significant in Christianity as one of the elements (alongside wine) of the Eucharist, and in other religions including Paganism.

In many cultures, bread is a metaphor for basic necessities and living conditions in general. For example, a "bread-winner" is a household's main economic contributor and has little to do with actual bread-provision. This is also seen in the phrase "putting bread on the table". The Roman poet Juvenal satirized superficial politicians and the public as caring only for "panem et circenses" (bread and circuses). In Russia in 1917, the Bolsheviks promised "peace, land, and bread." The term "breadbasket" denotes an agriculturally productive region. In parts of Northern, Central, Southern and Eastern Europe bread and salt is offered as a welcome to guests. In India, life's basic necessities are often referred to as "roti, kapra aur makan" (bread, clothes, and house).

Words for bread, including "dough" and "bread" itself, are used in English-speaking countries as synonyms for money. A remarkable or revolutionary innovation may be called the best thing since "sliced bread". The expression "to break bread with someone" means "to share a meal with someone". The English word "lord" comes from the Anglo-Saxon hlāfweard, meaning "bread keeper."

Bread is sometimes referred to as "the staff of life", although this term can refer to other staple foods in different cultures: the Oxford English Dictionary defines it as "bread (or similar staple food)".

== Bread stamps ==
The practice of stamping bread with ornamental motifs before baking goes back to ancient times. The stamp was a way of distinguishing between bread baked in large community ovens. It also conveyed spiritual or religious messages.

== Fraud ==
Bread has been subject to food fraud and adulteration with fillers. In medieval times, sand was used as a filler. The Russo-Ukrainian war has made sourcing wheat flour more challenging and raised concerns of bread flour fraud.

== See also ==
- Bark bread – Scandinavian bread used as famine food
- Bread bowl – Hollowed out bread loaf made to contain other food
- Bread clip – Closure device for plastic bags
- Breading – Residue of dried bread
- Bread machine – Type of home appliance for baking bread
- Bread pan – Kitchen utensil
- Crouton – Rebaked bread used as toppings
- List of breads
- List of bread dishes – Dishes using bread as a main ingredient, listed by category
- List of toast dishes
- Quick bread – Baked goods leavened with agents other than yeast
- Sliced bread – Loaf of bread pre-sliced with a machine
- Slow Bread – Type of bread made using very little yeast
- Sop – Bread soaked in liquid and eaten
- Stuffing – Edible mixture filling a food's cavity
- White bread – Type of bread made from white wheat flour
