= The Old Man in the Corner =

Emma Orczy character

- Cover of the 1908 1st edition
- Author: Baroness Orczy
- Language: English
- Published: 1908 Hodder & Stoughton
- Publication place: United Kingdom
- Followed by: The Case of Miss Elliott

The Old Man in the Corner is an unnamed armchair detective who appears in a series of short stories written by Baroness Orczy. He examines and solves crimes while sitting in the corner of a genteel London tea-room in conversation with a female journalist. He was one of the first of this character-type created in the wake of the huge popularity of the Sherlock Holmes stories. The character's moniker is used as the title of the collection of the earliest stories featuring the character.

== Publishing history ==
The character first appeared in The Royal Magazine in 1901 in a series of six "Mysteries of London". The following year he returned in seven "Mysteries of Great Cities" set in large provincial centers of the British Isles. The stories are told by an unnamed lady journalist who reports the conversation of the 'man in the corner' who sits at the same table in the A.B.C. teashop. For the book, twelve were rewritten in the third person, with the lady journalist now named Polly Burton. The title, The Old Man in the Corner (U.S. edition: The Man in the Corner) was given to one of the book collections of the earliest stories. Although it contains the earliest written stories in the series, they were not collected in book form until four years after the chronologically later stories in The Case of Miss Elliott (1905). The last book in the series is the much later Unravelled Knots (1925).

== Scenario ==
The Old Man concentrates mostly upon sensationalistic newspaper accounts, with the occasional courtroom visit, and relates all this while tying complicated knots in a piece of string. The plots themselves are typical of Edwardian crime fiction, resting on a foundation of unhappy marriages and the inequitable division of family property. Other period details include a murder in the London Underground, the murder of a female doctor, and two cases involving artists living in "bohemian" lodgings. Another new and noteworthy feature is that no one is ever brought to justice. Though the villains are identified by the narrator (who disdains to inform the police), most cannot be proven guilty beyond a reasonable doubt. The final story reveals that the Old Man himself is a criminal, due to some of his trademark knotted rope being found at crime scene, and thereby implies that he may be the mysterious "Bill Owen" the police are unable to locate.

== Stories ==
The stories included in this volume are:

1. The Fenchurch Street Mystery
2. The Robbery in Phillimore Terrace
3. The York Mystery
4. The Mysterious Death on the Underground Railway
5. The Liverpool Mystery
6. The Edinburgh Mystery
7. The Theft at the English Provident Bank
8. The Dublin Mystery
9. An Unparalleled Outrage (The Brighton Mystery)
10. The Regent's Park Murder
11. The De Genneville Peerage (The Birmingham Mystery)
12. The Mysterious Death in Percy Street

== Film and other media ==
The Old Man in the Corner was featured in a series of twelve British two-reel silent films, made by Stoll Pictures in 1924, written and directed by Hugh Croise and starring Rolf Leslie as The Old Man and Renee Wakefield as journalist Mary Hatley (Polly Burton in the book). These featured mysteries from each of the three collections:

- The Kensington Mystery (The Tragedy in Dartmoor Terrace)
- The Affair at the Novelty Theatre
- The Tragedy at Barnsdale Manor
- The York Mystery
- The Brighton Mystery
- The Northern Mystery (?)
- The Regent's Park Mystery
- The Mystery of Dogstooth Cliff
- The Mystery of Brudenell Court
- The Mystery of the Khaki Tunic
- The Tremarne Case
- The Hocussing of Cigarette

In the early 1970s Thames TV presented The Rivals of Sherlock Holmes based on the anthologies by Hugh Greene. The second series (1973) began with "The Mysterious Death on the Underground Railway" featuring Judy Geeson as Polly Burton. In this dramatization, the Old Man is replaced by the character of Polly's uncle, Sir Arthur Inglewood.

The radio series The Teahouse Detective was broadcast on BBC Radio 4 starring Bernard Hepton as "The Man in the Corner" and Suzanne Burdon as Polly Burton. The stories in the series were adapted for radio by Michael Butt and included:

1998

- The Metropolitan Line Murder (The Mysterious Death on the Underground Railway)
- The York Murder
- The Body in the Barge (The Fenchurch Street Mystery)
- The De Genneville Peerage

2000

- The Dublin Mystery
- The Edinburgh Mystery
- The Brighton Mystery
- The London Mystery (The Regent's Park Murder)

== Bibliography ==
- Binyon, T. J. (1989). "Murder Will Out: The Detective in Fiction", Oxford University Press, ISBN 0-19-219223-X
- Bleiler, E. F. (ed.) (1980). The Old Man in the Corner, Twelve Mysteries. Dover, ISBN 0-486-23972-1
- Russell, Allan K. (ed.) (1978). Rivals of Sherlock Holmes. Castle Books, ISBN 0-89009-207-9
