= Slow Bread =

Type of bread made using very little yeast

- Type: Bread

Slow bread is made using very little yeast. An extended amount of time is required to ferment the dough before baking. A benefit of this recipe is that the starch in the flour absorbs the water much more effectively. During the period of rest, the yeast multiplies and develops by-products like alcohol and acetic and lactic acids.

The structure of the crumb is also much more open.

Because the starch and gluten in the dough is "opened up" during the production process, the bread is easier to digest compared to bread made using the newest technology.
