= Sainsbury's, Camden =

Listed supermarket building in London, England

Coordinates: 51.5404°N 0.1407°W

Sainsbury's supermarket, Camden
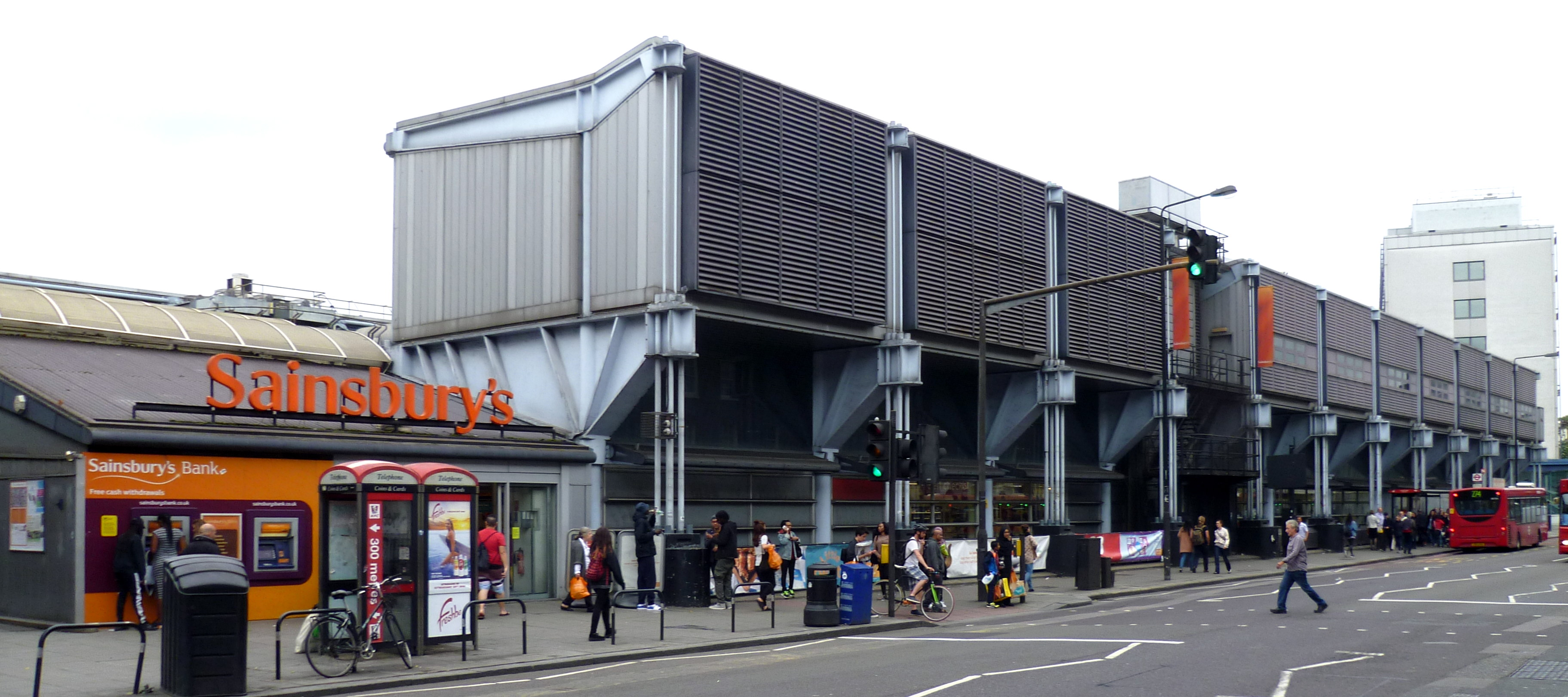
- Sainsbury's supermarket, Camden Road, London
- Interactive map of the Sainsbury's supermarket, Camden area

General information
- Type: Supermarket
- Architectural style: High-tech
- Location: London Borough of Camden, 17–21 Camden Road, London, NW1 9LJ, London, England
- Year built: 1986–1988
- Client: J Sainsbury plc
- Owner: J Sainsbury plc

Design and construction
- Architect: Nicholas Grimshaw & Partners

Website
- Sainsbury's Camden

Listed Building – Grade II
- Official name: Sainsbury's supermarket
- Designated: 19 July 2019
- Reference no.: 1463938

Sainsbury's supermarket, Camden is an architecturally notable supermarket building on Camden Road, north London, and is part of the J Sainsbury chain. It was designed by Nicholas Grimshaw & Partners and was completed in 1988, on the site of the former Aerated Bread Company Camden Town bakery. In 2019 it became the first purpose-built supermarket to be Grade II listed for its futuristic architecture.

== Overview ==
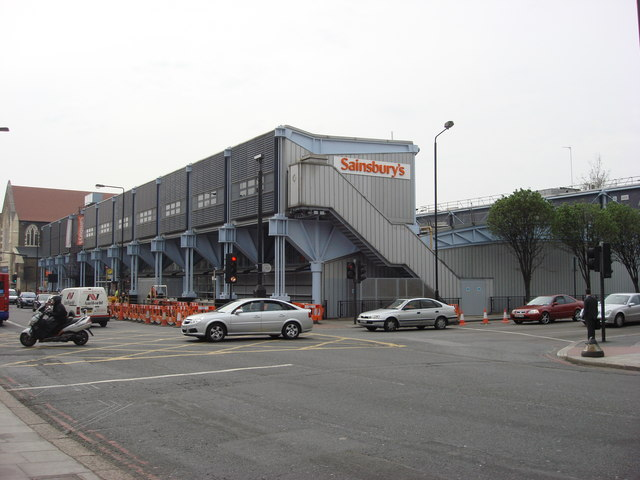
Sainsbury's supermarket on Camden Road

The present supermarket building at 17–21 Camden Road was completed in 1988 for J Sainsbury, two years after construction began by Wimpey. It is a high-tech architecture structure, with use of exposed steel, aluminium panels and glass. It has a sales area of 30,883 square feet (2,869.1 m^{2}) with underground parking for 299 cars. The site also includes a row of terrace houses (1–12 Grand Union Walk), the Grand Union House office block and a small crèche building comprising a row of studio spaces, for a site bounded by the Grand Union Canal and two of Camden's busiest roads.

The building was Grade II listed on 19 July 2019 by Historic England. The listing had been proposed by the Twentieth Century Society to block proposals to re-develop the site, which included the high-tech supermarket.

== Construction ==
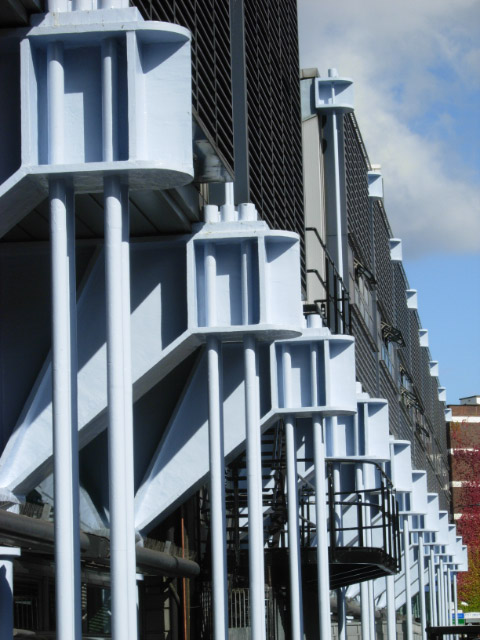
Sainsbury's Camden Town exposed steel

In the early 1980s, J Sainsbury took ownership of the former Aerated Bread Company Camden Town bakery building in the heart of Camden, which had ceased production in 1982, with a view to developing a supermarket on the site. The site was roughly triangular, bounded on two sides by busy roads and on the third by the Grand Union Canal.

In April 1985, Sainsbury's obtained outline planning permission for a scheme by Scott Brownrigg & Turner, but this was rejected by Sainsbury's newly established vetting committee, chaired by the architecture critic Colin Amery, who reported directly to Sainsbury's Chairman Sir John Sainsbury. Detailed planning permission was granted in May 1986, to designs by Nicholas Grimshaw & Partners, having been commended by the Royal Fine Art Commission as an "example of bold and enlightened patronage", even though it was opposed by the Regent's Canal Conservation Advisory Group. Construction began in August 1986, with Wimpey as the main contractor.

Construction was completed in 1988 and the store was opened on 12 December 1988 by the then Sainsbury's Joint Managing Director Joe Barnes. On opening, it was described by The Guardian newspaper as being "Building of the year".
