= Unravelled Knots =

Book by Emma Orczy

- First edition cover
- Author: Baroness Orczy
- Language: English
- Genre: Detective fiction
- Publisher: Hutchinson & Co
- Publication date: 1925
- Publication place: United Kingdom
- Media type: Print (hardback & paperback)
- Pages: 303
- Preceded by: The Case of Miss Elliott

Unravelled Knots, by Baroness Orczy, author of the Scarlet Pimpernel series, contains thirteen short stories about the Old Man in the Corner, Orzy's armchair detective who solves crimes for his own entertainment. This is the last of three books of short stories featuring the detective and follows those in The Old Man in the Corner and The Case of Miss Elliott.

In these first person narratives, a woman, presumably the Polly Burton of The Old Man in the Corner, visits a tea-house after an absence of twenty years to find the Man in the Corner just as she had last seen him years before, fidgeting with his string and with mysteries to unravel. She is fascinated by the unlikely unraveling she hears, but despite her sarcasm and pride in her own investigative talents she remains the learner, impressed in spite of herself. The book is also notable for the development of the Old Man himself as a character; while in previous books he would simply extoll the genius of a criminal who outwitted the police while never lifting a finger to bring them to justice, here he occasionally recommends that his listener publish his writings (whenever the circumstances will protect her from a libel suit), or references having notified the police about a conclusion.

Seven of these stories originally appeared in the London Magazine (1923–1924) and five in Hutchinson's Magazine (1924–1925).

== Contents ==
1. The Mystery of the Khaki Tunic
2. The Mystery of the Ingres Masterpiece
3. The Mystery of the Pearl Necklace
4. The Mystery of the Russian Prince
5. The Mysterious Tragedy in Bishop's Road
6. The Mystery of the Dog's Tooth Cliff
7. The Tytherton Case
8. The Mystery of Brudenell Court
9. The Mystery of the White Carnation
10. The Mystery of the Montmartre Hat
11. The Miser of Maida Vale
12. The Fulton Gardens Mystery
13. A Moorland Tragedy
