= Aerated Bread Company =

British company

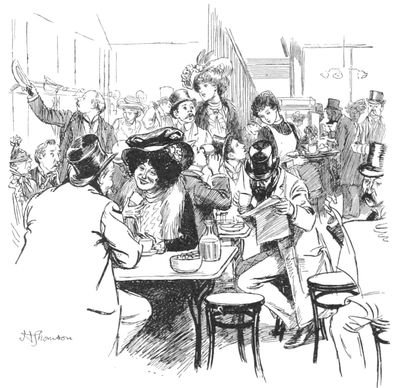
- An Aerated Bread Shop in Highways and Byways of London (1902)
- Type: Public
- Industry: Bakery, Restaurant
- Founded: London, England (1862)
- Founder: Dr. John Dauglish
- Defunct: 1955
- Fate: Acquired by Allied Bakeries in 1955
- Successor: Allied Bakeries
- Headquarters: London, England, United Kingdom
- Number of locations: 250 tea shops (1923)
- Area served: Worldwide
- Key people: Dr. John Dauglish (Founder); Benjamin Ward Richardson (Director)
- Products: Baked goods, Teas, "Greasy spoon" offerings
- Owner: Associated British Foods

The Aerated Bread Company Ltd (A.B.C.) was a British company founded and headquartered in London. It was established in 1862 by John Dauglish as a bakery using a new method he had developed for breadmaking which did not use yeast. In 1864 it opened a shop selling tea and other groceries, followed in the 1870s by tea rooms. It was one of the first café chains in Britain and other parts of the world. (Others included Lyons and Lockhart's Cocoa Rooms)

== History ==
=== Founding ===
The Aerated Bread Company Ltd was founded in 1862 by John Dauglish (1824–1866).

The company had a factory in Adelaide, in the colony of South Australia, in the 1870s-1880s. Cecil Augustus Motteram, who later established his own company manufacturing biscuits, became manager in 1881.

The business was created as an incorporated company listed on the London Stock Exchange (LSE). When the company was floated, its failure was predicted and its initial public offering was poorly supported. However, its initial £1 shares had risen to £5 7s 8d by 1890. By 1898, shares had more than doubled from their 1890 value and were trading at £12 per share and declaring a dividend of 37 1/2 percent. By 1899, A.B.C. shares had increased a further 16 2/3 percent and were trading at £14 per share.

=== Technology ===
Dauglish earned his medical degree at Edinburgh. Dissatisfied by the bread available in Scotland at the time, he began to make his own, and to study the science associated with the process. When he applied his earlier studies in chemistry to the process of bread making, he determined that it would be possible to produce carbonic acid gas in bread without yeast. He established that if one could instead introduce carbon dioxide to the process—by dissolving it into solution in the water—this would eliminate the need for fermentation, dramatically reduce the need for physical contact with the dough on the part of the workers, and consequently introduce a greater level of cleanliness into the bread-making process. He sought to abolish manual kneading, which he believed was unclean and unhealthy. Some years later, an 1878 issue of the scientific journal Nature reported:

As to the perfect cleanliness of this mechanical process for making bread there can be no question; it is immeasurably superior to the barbarous and old, but as Dr. Richardson remarked, not "time-honoured system of kneading dough by the hands and feet of the workman".

Such a system would also lend itself to a high degree of automation. A patent for the new method of bread making was granted in 1856.

In 1859 Dauglish presented a paper on his new method to the Royal Society of Arts, for which he received a silver medal. His method also received endorsements from various Victorian-era physicians and sanitarians. Moreover, because it was considered a healthy bread, it was introduced into many hospitals. In 1862 the Aerated Bread Company (A.B.C.) was set up to exploit Dauglish's newly patented method.

Dauglish described his technique as avoiding the "destructive influence of fermentation", and claimed that the bread contained "all the gluten and all the albuminous food of the wheat", each of which is diminished in quantity under traditional fermentation methods.

A further benefit of the process is that, unlike with the traditional fermentation method, additives like alum never have to be added to slow the rate of fermentation, leading Richardson to term Aerated bread "additive-free". The 1878 issue of Nature reported that

The stream of pure water charged with carbonic acid gas vesiculates the dough, which has required neither alum, nor blue vitriol [copper sulphate], nor lime-water, to check the irregular fermentation, and neutralise the sourness of mouldy or otherwise damaged or inferior flour.

However, the journal reported that some additives were sometimes still introduced in the process:

[T]he adoption of the aerating process does not of itself necessarily exclude all adulterations of the bread: materials to whiten the loaf and to cause the retention of a larger percentage of water may still be used.

The aeration method allowed bakeries to save raw materials, time, and labour costs. As an illustration of the first of these economies, Dauglish estimated that, by eliminating the decomposition of the starches and gluten that occur from traditional fermentation (a loss equal to between three and six percent), this had a value in the middle of the 19th century of "£5,000,000 in the total quantity of bread made, annually, in the United Kingdom" (equivalent to £543,200,000 in 2025). The process is a highly automated one, and thus saves time and reduces labour costs. Whereas the traditional dough fermentation method required between eight and ten hours to ready a batch of dough for baking, the Dauglish method has dough ready for the ovens in approximately half an hour. The time savings meant that the daily hours worked could be reduced, obviating the need for the night shifts that were so prevalent in the baking industry at the time. Finally, not needing most additives otherwise required to enhance the fermentation process reduces the cost of factor inputs while producing a virtually unadulterated product.

The technology allowed A.B.C. to sell its product for less than the traditional fermentation method bakers. The downward impact on prices of A.B.C. moving into a market could be felt almost immediately. For example, in 1866 Australia, A.B.C.'s lower prices forced other bakers to reduce theirs by between 8 and 17 percent.

Competition from A.B.C. prompted advertising efforts from fermentation bakers to try to retain their market share. The traditional fermentation process produces alcohol within the dough, though virtually all of it dissipates in the extreme heat of the ovens. To counter the success of aerated bread in the market, traditional fermentation bakers began focusing on this in their advertising. To that end, placard advertisements were used—especially in the neighbourhood of the A.B.C. factory—urging people to "buy the bread with the gin in it", at a time when gin was thought to have medicinal properties as it was made from juniper berries. Sir Benjamin Ward Richardson's great support of aerated bread at the expense of traditionally baked bread has been suggested to have been motivated by his dislike of alcohol.

A.B.C.'s first bakery was in Islington, London. In the late Victorian-era, the Dauglish method was considered the superior system by which to mass-produce bread. In his memoir of the method, Benjamin Ward Richardson, a later director of the company, wrote:

I am convinced, from careful and prolonged observation, that the Dauglish method of bread manufacture is on the whole the best that has been discovered ... [I]t is the cleanliest of all the processes known and followed; it calls for less drudgery, and, it is not unjust to say, less objectionable labour, from the employed in bread manufacture; it inflicts less arduous toil, and so lessens the rapid wearing out of the body, which is an unfortunate fate of many of those who are engaged in the manufacture of the staff of life; it supplies a purer article to those who depend, largely, upon the staff of life for their daily aliment. Lastly, it supplies ... a better article, one which gives to the public the fullest food value that can be got out of the corn [i.e., wheat] from which the food is made, and which enables the manufacture of all kinds of flour or meal, white meal, mixed meal, whole meal, to be most completely and most easily produced.

As early as 1863 A.B.C.'s method regarding their "pure aerated graham bread" was receiving recommendations as far away as New York City:

We have been shown specimens of this new and excellent article of food, manufactured by the Aerated Bread Company ... It far surpasses anything of the kind yet introduced. With their increased facilities for making bread, the Aerated Bread Company hope soon to introduce to the trade all the varieties necessary for household consumption.

After Dauglish had spent four years introducing his bread-making system, his health worsened; this has been said to be due to the labour and excitement involved, and he visited various health resorts throughout Europe. In 1865 he became seriously ill in Paris; he returned to the U.K. and died at Malvern in early 1866. He is buried at Malvern Wells.

Thirty years after Dauglish's death, his company was thriving. As a result of its market success, A.B.C.'s shares were trading at 12 times their initial public offering price and, at its 1895 annual general meeting, it was stated by the presiding officer, Major John Bolton, that A.B.C. "had no reason to fear competition".

The Dauglish method survived its creator, and Dauglish's company survived him by well over a century, but his method was later superseded by the adoption of mechanical, high-speed dough processes such as the Chorleywood Bread Process (CBP), now used for 80 percent of UK bread production. These newer methods permit the use of lower-grade flours than were required by earlier processes.

=== Tea shops and early women's issues ===
A.B.C. operated a chain of self-service A.B.C. tea shops. These grew from A.B.C. opening a shop selling tea in the courtyard of London's Fenchurch Street Railway Station in 1864, two years after the company's founding. The idea for adding dedicated tearooms is attributed to a London-based manager of the Aerated Bread Company who had been serving free tea and snacks to customers and seems to have happened around 1875. The motivation for the company acting upon the manager's suggestion was to supplement the income derived from bread manufacture, which was not sufficient to pay a dividend to shareholders.

The tearooms provided one of the first public places where women in the Victorian era could eat a meal, alone or with women friends, without a male escort. While by 1880 unescorted women could visit higher-end restaurants, they had to avoid the bar. In at least one instance, a women's social club was housed directly above an A.B.C. tea shop:

The New Somerville Club, close to Oxford Circus ... was located over an Aerated Bread Company's shop, and notwithstanding the complaint that the female employés of that company do not participate in the vast profits of the undertaking, the members of the Somerville get meals from the aerated bread shop [sic] sent up to the general room above, a bright and very prettily furnished apartment. Men are admitted to this club as guests.

The reference to the female employees of the company not sharing in the company's profits was a very real concern at the time. It was even referred to as a "gross case of company inhumanity." At the 1895 annual general meeting of the company, Richardson proposed, and another doctor (also a director), Furnival, seconded, "giving the girls employed by the company some additional advantages." The physicians felt that if the company "did not give them one meal a day ... they were a mean and shabby lot." The board chairman felt that the company had made great strides in that area: they were already giving the employees one meal a day, providing a hot dinner "at a nominal price," and "[n]ot a girl went into the company's service now who did not receive 10 shillings a week."

However, the remunerative conditions of the employees remained an important issue that came to a boil at the 1898 annual general meeting. The dividend that year was 37 1/2 per cent, up from 30 per cent four years previously. The shares initially sold for £1 were trading at £12, but a shareholder who suggested a pay rise for the female shop workers was shouted down and ruled out of order by the chairman.

As safe havens for unescorted women of the Victorian era, the A.B.C. tea shops were recommended to delegates of the Congress of the International Council of Women held in London the week ending 9 July 1899.

In 1919 a diner at an A.B.C. shop in Sydney, Australia, filed a claim against A.B.C. for £1,000 claiming that she had eaten a pie at A.B.C. that contained a mouse. The plaintiff was revealed to have filed a false claim and the court found for the defendant.

At its peak in 1923, A.B.C. had 150 branch shops in London and 250 tea shops and was second in terms of outlets only to J. Lyons and Co. This proliferation led George Orwell to view A.B.C.'s tea shops, and those of its competitors, as the "sinister strand in English catering, the relentless industrialisation that was overtaking it ... everything comes out of a carton or a tin, or is hauled out of a refrigerator or squirted out of a tap or squeezed out of a tube."

This did not stop playwright George Bernard Shaw (1856–1950) from frequenting A.B.C.'s teashops. His diaries are replete with entries attesting to his being a habitué of the establishment at various of its London locations. One such entry is for 12 December 1888: "... to the Aerated Bread Shop opposite the Mansion House station and had some eggs and chocolate there." An entry for 27 January 1891 has him taking tea "at the Aerated Bread Shop at the corner of Parliament Square." An entry from 4 January 1892 has Shaw holding a meeting of the Shelley Society's The Cenci committee at the A.B.C. teashop at Rathbone Place. (Note: Dealing with the taboo topic of incest as it did, The Cenci had been banned from public performance. The Shelley Committee's private showing of the play was an attempt by Shaw and his contemporaries to evade this ban.) Among other A.B.C. locations at which Shaw dined were Charing Cross Station, Oxford Circus, Piccadilly Circus, and opposite St. Clement Danes Church. On arriving in England in 1953, the artist Stass Paraskos also gained his first job in London at the Tottenham Court Road branch of the A.B.C. tea shop, working as a pot washer there.

=== End of independence ===
The Aerated Bread Company ceased to be an independent company in 1955. Australian operations had already been liquidated in 1951. British operations were changed when the company, self-service tea shops and all, was purchased in 1955 by Allied Bakeries, led by Canadian-born W. Garfield Weston. Weston's corporate empire already owned the luxury Fortnum & Mason food shop and tea rooms in Piccadilly. A U.S. magazine of the day said that "[T]he Piccadilly prince is about to marry the tearoom Cinderella." Allied was expected to pay $8.1 million for A.B.C. At that time, Allied itself had a large share of the UK baked goods market. Allied's market share prior to acquiring A.B.C. was 10% of all UK bread production and the sale of 20 million biscuits per day. Allied's sales the year prior were $154 million with profits of $12.6 million in 1955 dollars. With the acquisition, Allied almost doubled its share of the UK's bread market by the end of the decade.

A.B.C. continued trading, with a major bakery on the Regent's Canal in Camden Town, London. The Camden Town bakery closed and the A.B.C. name disappeared when the company ceased operation in 1982; the building was demolished and replaced by Sainsbury's, Camden supermarket and Grand Union Walk Housing. Nowadays, the only traces of the Aerated Bread Company are faded signs above stores.

== A.B.C. Tea Rooms in literature ==
The Three Imposters (Arthur Machen)

In 'The Encounter Of The Pavement', a man frantically accosts Mr Dyson as he crosses Oxford Street and asks if the person who came out of the Aerated Bread Company shop and jumped in to a hansom was 'a youngish-looking man with dark whiskers and spectacles'.

Augustus Carp, Esq. (Henry Howarth Bashford)

In Henry Howarth Bashford's Augustus Carp, Esq., having entered commercial life as a show-room manager in the religious publishing business of Mr Chrysostom Lorton of Paternoster Row, Enfield, Carp makes several references to the Aerated Bread Company in a detailed description of his daily routine:

At eleven o'clock, therefore, I would despatch Miss Botterill to a neighbouring branch of the Aerated Bread Company for a glass of hot milk and a substantial slice of a cake appropriately known as lunch cake. I would then, at twelve-thirty, repair in person to the same branch of this valuable company, where I would generally order from one of the quieter waitresses a double portion of sausages and mashed potatoes, accompanied by a cup of coffee, and followed by an apple dumpling or a segment of baked jam roll.

and:

By three o'clock, however, they had both returned, and I would take the opportunity, five minutes later, of again sending Miss Botterill to the Aerated Bread Company for my mid-afternoon cup of tea. This I would drink, unthickened by food, but at half-past four I would send her out for another cup, and with this I would eat a roll and butter, a small dish of honey, and perhaps a single doughnut.

The Secret Adversary (Agatha Christie)

In the 1922 espionage thriller, The Secret Adversary by Agatha Christie, Tommy Beresford is held captive by a spy ring. Upon escaping, the first thing Tommy does is head to an A.B.C. teashop for sustenance.

First of all, he must have a square meal. He had eaten nothing since midday yesterday. He turned into an A.B.C. shop and ordered eggs and bacon and coffee. Whilst he ate, he read a morning paper propped up in front of him.

Once satiated, Tommy and his partners in detection go on to foil the plans of the conspirators.

The Secret Adversary was adapted into a teleplay and broadcast in 1983 by London Weekend Television as part of that television network's Partners in Crime series.

Another story, the short story "The Sunningdale Mystery" from the "Partners in Crime" series, opens with Tommy and his partner Tuppence eating in an A.B.C. shop having a cheese cake. Christie's novel The A.B.C. Murders is unrelated to the shops.

"A Cooking Egg" (T. S. Eliot)

In a poem composed in 1917 and first published in 1919, T. S. Eliot asks, "Where are the eagles and the trumpets?" His answer:

Buried beneath some snow-deep Alps.
Over buttered scones and crumpets
Weeping, weeping multitudes
Droop in a hundred A.B.C.'s.

The End of the Affair (Graham Greene)

Graham Greene's The End of the Affair is set in post-World War II London in the 1940s. Twice the narrator, Maurice Bendrix, visits an A.B.C. The first time he confers with a detective, Mr. Parkis, "who had met me by appointment in an A.B.C—it was his own suggestion as he had the boy with him and couldn't take him into a bar" (Book Two, Chapter 6). The second time occurs as Bendrix searches for his former lover, Sarah Miles: "There was an A.B.C in the High Street and I tried that. She wasn’t there" (Book Four, Chapter 1). Greene's The Human Factor (1978), Part One Chapter 1, refers to the A.B.C. in the Strand as having Maltesers available.

The Devil's Manuscript (Sidney Kilner Levett-Yeats)

In this short story, first published in the author's second collection The Heart of Denise (1899), the corrupt, bankrupt publisher John Brown is visited by a figure calling himself 'M. De Bac', who offers Brown a manuscript that will make his fortune and funds to publish it, because Brown's past crimes "have done him yeoman's service" and he is "too useful to let drift". After the visitor vanishes without re-passing Brown's assistant Simmonds, the latter, "sallies forth to an äerated-bread shop for his cheap and wholesome lunch".

The Spy Who Came in from the Cold (John le Carré)

In Chapter 5 ('Credit') of John le Carré's The Spy Who Came in from the Cold, set in early 1960s, Cold War era London, Liz arrives early at the library and anxiously awaits Leamas who did not show up the day before. Her hopes fade as the morning passes..."She had forgotten to make sandwiches for herself that day so she decided to take a bus to the Bayswater Road and go to the ABC. She felt sick and empty, but not hungry. Should she go and find him?"

Cakes and Ale (Somerset Maugham)

In Chapter 14 of Somerset Maugham's Cakes and Ale, Mrs Barton Trafford supports up and coming authors, including Edward Driffield (one of the main characters in the book) whom she meets in London: "Sometimes she took him for a walk on the Chelsea Embankment ... and had tea in an ABC shop."

Of Human Bondage (Somerset Maugham)

In Chapter 14 of Somerset Maugham's Of Human Bondage, Philip is living a lonely life in London, having recently moved there to train as a chartered accountant: "It was not worth while to go back to Barnes for the interval between the closing of the museum and his meal in an A.B.C. shop, and the time hung heavily on his hands".

Not That It Matters (A. A. Milne)

This is a collection of essays and articles written by A. A. Milne while editor of Punch. In one entitled, "The Diary Habit", Milne gives an example of how an exciting diary entry would be written, complete with a visit to an ABC.

TUESDAY.—"Letter from solicitor informing me that I have come into £1,000,000 through the will of an Australian gold-digger named Tomkins. On referring to my diary I find that I saved his life two years ago by plunging into the Serpentine. This is very gratifying. Was late at the office as I had to look in at the Palace on the way, in order to get knighted, but managed to get a good deal of work done before I was interrupted by a madman with a razor, who demanded £100. Shot him after a desperate struggle. Tea at an ABC, where I met the Duke of —. Fell into the Thames on my way home, but swam ashore without difficulty."

The Old Man in the Corner (Baroness Orczy)

In a 1909 collection of short stories entitled The Old Man in the Corner, by Baroness Orczy, a "teahouse detective" meets and discusses criminal cases with a young woman journalist, Miss Polly Burton, in an A.B.C. teashop. The teashops are first mentioned in "The Fenchurch Street Mystery."

Now this particular corner, this very same table, that special view of the magnificent marble hall – known as the Norfolk Street branch of the Aërated Bread Company's depôts – were Polly's own corner, table, and view. Here she had partaken of eleven pennyworth of luncheon and one pennyworth of daily information ever since that glorious never-to-be-forgotten day when she was enrolled on the staff of the Evening Observer (we'll call it that, if you please), and became a member of that illustrious and world-famed organization known as the British Press.

These stories were also broadcast in 1998 and 2000 as radio plays on BBC Radio 4 as The Teahouse Detective.

In Search of Sixpence (Michael Paraskos)

In Michael Paraskos's novel In Search of Sixpence, the hero, Geroud, goes to the A.B.C. tea room on London's Tottenham Court Road in search of a clue to the real intentions of the sinister character Ezzy Pound.

"Something told him if Pound didn't work for the BBC he needed to find out more about the ABC. What had Waites called it, the Alpha-Beta Corporation? And there was Geroud thinking it had something to do with tea shops and aerated bread. Still, he had an urge just to check it wasn't actually the ABC Tearoom in Fitzrovia, at least before the initials changed again into the AA or RAC or something. Everything was already too fluid for comfort."

Asta's Book (Ruth Rendell)

In the section of Ruth Rendell's novel Asta's Book dealing with the trial of Alfred Roper for the murder of his wife, Alfred's friend testifies that Alfred told him of his marital troubles when they met "in an ABC teashop in the neighborhood of Leicester Square."

The Pilgrimage Vol. II – The Tunnel (Dorothy Richardson)

Dorothy Richardson's The Pilgrimage Vol. II has Miriam is discussing where to eat following her statements damning the conventional lives women were forced to follow.

"'What would you have done?' 'An egg, at an A.B.C.s.' 'How fond you are of them A.B.C.s.' 'I love them.' 'What is it you love about them?' 'I think it's their dowdiness. The food is honest; not showy, and they are so blissfully dowdy.'"

"The Philanthropist and the Happy Cat" (Saki)

Saki has the smug Jocantha Bessbury decide to give a theatre ticket to someone less fortunate than herself:

She went forth in search of a tea-shop and philanthropic adventure. ... In a corner of an A.B.C. shop she found an unoccupied table, whereat she promptly installed herself, impelled by the fact that at the next table was sitting a young girl, rather plain of feature, with tired, listless eyes and a general air of uncomplaining forlornness.

Dracula (Bram Stoker)

In the latter part of Bram Stoker's novel Dracula, Jonathan Harker recalls stopping at the Aerated Bread Company for a cup of tea, after having spent the afternoon searching for Count Dracula's lair.

It was now dark, and I was tired and hungry. I got a cup of tea at the Aerated Bread Company and came down to Purfleet by the next train.

Night and Day (Virginia Woolf)

In the Virginia Woolf novel, Night and Day, Katherine Hilbery goes into an A.B.C. shop to write a letter to Ralph Denham.

"She would write him a letter and take it at once to his house. She bought paper and pencil at a bookstall, and entered an A.B.C. shop, where, by ordering a cup of coffee, she secured an empty table, and began at once to write..."

Jacob's Room (Virginia Woolf)

In the Virginia Woolf novel, Jacob's Room, Florinda walks the streets of London and ends up in an A.B.C. shop.

"Now Florinda wept, and spent the day wandering the streets [...] read love letters, propping them against the milk pot in the A.B.C. shop; detected glass in the sugar bowl; accused the waitress of wishing to poison her; declared that young men stared at her ..."

Tono-Bungay (H. G. Wells)

In the H. G. Wells novel, Tono-Bungay, George is shown about London for the first time by his uncle Teddy and aunt Susan and they go to an Aerated Bread Shop.

"Sometimes we were walking, sometimes we were on the tops of great staggering horse omnibuses in a heaving jumble of traffic, and at one point we had tea in an Aerated Bread Shop."

'1919' (John Dos Passos)

In the second volume of the U.S.A. Trilogy by John Dos Passos, two young Americans visit London for the first time. "George and Eveline went to see the Elgin Marbles and the Tower of London and ate their lunches in A.B.C. restaurants and had a fine time riding in the tube."

The Gold Bat (P. G. Wodehouse)

In The Gold Bat, P. G. Wodehouse writes

The boy who smokes at school ... will degenerate gradually into a person that plays dominoes in the smoking room of A.B.C. shops with friends who wear bowler hats and frock coats.
