= Proteose =

Protein breakdown product

A proteose is any of various water-soluble compounds that are produced during in-vitro or in-vivo hydrolytic breakdown of proteins a little before producing amino acids. It forms after breaking down of polypeptides by proteases such as gastric pepsin. In addition to proteoses, peptones are also formed at this stage. The difference between peptones and proteoses is that proteoses are precipitated from solution by half saturation with ammonium sulfate, while peptones don't react even with fully saturated ammonium sulfate.
