= The Mysterious Mr Quin =

1930 short story collection by Agatha Christie

- Dust-jacket illustration of the first UK edition
- Author: Agatha Christie
- Cover artist: Thomas Derrick
- Language: English
- Genre: Detective fiction
- Publisher: William Collins & Sons
- Publication date: 14 April 1930
- Publication place: United Kingdom
- Media type: Print (hardback & paperback)
- Pages: 288 (first edition, hardcover)
- Preceded by: Partners in Crime
- Followed by: Giant's Bread
- Text: The Mysterious Mr Quin at Wikisource

The Mysterious Mr Quin is a short story collection by British writer Agatha Christie, first published in the UK by William Collins & Sons on 14 April 1930 and in the US by Dodd, Mead and Company later in the same year. The UK edition retailed at seven shillings and sixpence (7/6) and the US edition at $2.00.

Each chapter or story involves a separate mystery that is solved through the interaction between the characters of Mr Satterthwaite, an elderly socialite, and the eponymous Mr Quin who appears almost magically at the most opportune moments and disappears just as mysteriously.

In her foreword to the collection, Christie states: "Mr Quin, I consider, is an epicure's taste." (HarperCollins 2017 p. vii) Her husband Max Mallowan described the stories as "detection written in a fanciful vein, touching on the fairy story, a natural product of Agatha's peculiar imagination." Christie's favourite stories were 'The World's End', 'The Man from the Sea' and 'Harlequin's Lane'. (p. viii)

== Characters ==
Mr Satterthwaite is aged 62 in the first story, in the sixth story he is 69, and in another work 'The Harlequin Tea Set' (which takes place "a large number of years" after 'The Mysterious Mr Quin'), he is "now of an advanced age". He is first described as "a little bent, dried-up man with a peering face oddly elflike, and an intense and inordinate interest in other people's lives. All his life, so to speak, he had sat in the front row of the stalls watching various dramas of human nature unfold before him." (HarperCollins, 2017 p. 1)

In her foreword, Christie describes Satterthwaite as "[t]he gossip, the looker-on at life, the little man who without ever touching the depths of joy and sorrow himself, recognizes drama when he sees it […]". (p. viii)

He is described as "given to old-fashioned expressions" (p. 74) and as "sentimental and Victorian" (p. 244). Like Hercule Poirot, he is habitually "polite" (p. 100). He is a wealthy "gentleman", with a Rolls-Royce driven by a chauffeur named Masters, and a cordon bleu chef (p. 53). He is known as an art collector, which features prominently in 'The Dead Harlequin'. He hires a box at the Royal Opera House on Tuesdays and Fridays during the season. He is fond of the company of the social elite: "In his way, a harmless, gentlemanly, old-fashioned way, Mr. Satterthwaite was a snob." (p. 265)

After their first encounter, Satterthwaite greets Quin warmly whenever he meets him and refers to him as "my dear friend" (p. 230).

Mr Harley Quin is first described as "tall and slender [...] a thin dark man" with a "pleasant level voice" (p. 7). Often in the stories, through some trick of the light, he appears to be momentarily "dressed in every colour of the rainbow" and his face seems to be masked, alluding to the traditional harlequin motley and mask. Rather than solving mysteries directly, Mr Quin guides others to make deductions: Satterthwaite describes Quin as a "catalyst" (p. 134). Mr Quin frequents Arlecchino restaurant in Soho and a country inn called The Bells and Motley.

Christie, in her foreword, describes Mr Quin as "not quite human and yet concerned with the affairs of human beings and particularly of lovers. He is also an advocate for the dead." (p. viii)

As the stories progress, Christie hints more strongly at Quin's supernatural nature. In 'The Sign in the Sky', Satterthwaite refers to Quin as "a man of magic" (p. 79). In 'The Man From The Sea', Quin explains that he appeared because he had a "commission to perform" as an "advocate for the dead" (p. 157). In 'The Bird with the Broken Wing', a character who meets Quin describes him as like a "lost soul" (p. 247). In 'The Dead Harlequin', when someone asks Quin why he intervened after witnessing a murder (seemingly invisibly) many years earlier, Quin replies: "So that the dead may rest in peace" (p. 236). In the final story of the collection, a character says "Harlequin is only a myth, an invisible presence. Unless […] his name is — Death!" (p. 333)

== Plot summaries ==
=== The Coming of Mr Quin ===
It is New Year's Eve and a house party is taking place at Royston, the country house of Tom Evesham and his wife, Lady Laura. Among the guests are Mr Satterthwaite, Sir Richard Conway and Alex Portal and his Australian wife of two years, Eleanor. Satterthwaite finds her intriguing on many counts, especially why a blonde would dye her hair dark when the reverse is more common. After the clocks strike midnight, the older members among the guests mention Derek Capel, the previous owner of Royston, who committed suicide ten years previously, seemingly without reason. Tom Evesham stops this conversation and a few minutes later the women retire to bed.

Left to their whisky and the fire, the men restart the conversation regarding Capel. There is a sudden knock on the door. It is a stranger; the lights through the stained glass above the door cast a multi-coloured look over his motoring clothes. Mr Harley Quin asks for shelter while his chauffeur repairs his broken-down car. He knows this part of the world and knew Derek Capel, and he skilfully steers the conversation round to the question of why Capel should suddenly take his own life. Satterthwaite feels that Quin's appearance on this night is no accident. As the discussion continues, Satterthwaite spots Eleanor Portal crouched down in the darkness at the top of the stairs listening in.

Capel told the guests on the night of his death that he was about to be engaged. They assumed that it was to Marjorie Dilke. His secretiveness about the engagement makes Conway wonder if the engagement was to someone else, such as a married woman. All agree that Capel's manner that night was like a man who had won a large gamble and was defying the odds, yet ten minutes later he shot himself. A late post of letters and newspapers arrived, the first for several days in the snow-bound countryside, but Capel had not opened any of the letters. A policeman was at the house, returning one of Capel's dogs that had strayed. He was in the kitchen when the shot was fired. Quin asks them to place the exact date, possibly by reference to some event in the news, and the men remember it was the time of the Appleton murder trial. Mr Appleton was an old man who mistreated his far younger wife, and Capel was a friend of theirs. Appleton died by strychnine poisoning but the poison was only found after the body had been exhumed. His wife, who had smashed a decanter of port from which her husband had drunk – perhaps to destroy the evidence – had been put on trial and found not guilty, but had then left the country because of the scandal.

Quin takes the men through the sequence of events: Capel saw the paragraph in the newspaper reporting that the exhumation order had been given; then he saw a policeman approaching his house. Not knowing that this visit was about the missing dog, he assumed that he was to be arrested, and so shot himself. His audience is stunned at the accusation that Capel was a murderer, objecting that he was not at the Appleton home on the day of the death; but Quin points out that strychnine is not soluble and would collect at the bottom of the decanter if placed there a week before. Why did Mrs Appleton smash the decanter? At Quin's prompting, Satterthwaite theorises it was to protect Capel, not to cover her own guilty tracks. Mr Quin leaves the house. Eleanor Portal follows him down the drive to say thank you, and then she and her husband are reconciled. Eleanor is the former Mrs Appleton. Capel's suicide left her unable to clear her name totally, until Quin's appearance.

=== The Shadow on the Glass ===
Mr Satterthwaite is a guest for a week at a house party held by Mr and Mrs Unkerton at their home, Greenway's House. Mr Richard Scott, there with his new wife Moira, is the best friend of another guest, Major John Porter. Both men are big-game hunters. Mrs Iris Staverton arrives. Rumour says she had a relationship in Africa with Richard Scott. Also present is Lady Cynthia Drage, a gossipy society woman, and the popular, young Captain Jimmy Allenson, and whom Lady Cynthia met in Egypt the previous year – where the Scotts met and married.

The house is said to be haunted by the ghost of a cavalier who was killed by his wife's roundhead lover. The two fled the house but, looking back, saw the image of the cavalier looking at them from an upstairs window. The glass has been replaced many times but the image always returns on the new pane. The Scotts stay in this room, with the offending window panelled over. Satterthwaite shows this window to Major Porter from a grassy knoll some distance from the house where the image is clear. Major Porter confides to Satterthwaite that Mrs Staverton ought not to have come to the party.

They overhear Mrs Staverton telling Richard Scott that he will be sorry, and that jealousy can drive a man to murder. That evening, Mrs Unkerton tells Satterthwaite that she has sent for a glazier to replace the haunted pane of glass. Satterthwaite realises that she senses the tension in the house. The next evening, Satterthwaite and Porter retrace their steps in the dusk to the grassy knoll and conclude that the glass is not yet replaced, as the cavalier's image is still there.

Returning, they hear two gunshots, and find Mrs Staverton at the privy garden holding a gun and two dead people on the ground – Captain Allenson, shot in the chest, and Mrs Scott, shot in the back. Mrs Staverton says that she arrived in the garden and picked up the discarded gun. While the police are fetched, Satterthwaite notices a spot of blood on the earlobe of Mrs Scott and sees that one of her earrings has been torn away.

The situation looks bad for Mrs Staverton in the eyes of the police. In the middle of the enquiry, Mr Quin arrives. Satterthwaite describes his ability to help people see problems from new angles. Prompted by Quin, Satterthwaite points out the torn earlobe, which leads to a new analysis of the gunshots. The first bullet passed through Moira into Allenson, in an embrace. The second bullet hit her ear. The Scotts met in Cairo the previous winter when Allenson was there – were Mrs Scott and Allenson lovers?

Unkerton reveals that the glazier did visit that morning. Next to the window, they find a small feather that matches one of Mrs Scott's hats. Quin describes the crime – Richard Scott pulled the movable panel back, knowing the house well, and then saw his wife and her lover in the garden. He posed like the storied cavalier, donning his wife's hat to complete the profile. He shot the two from the window and then threw the pistol onto the grass below. He was happy to let Mrs Staverton take the blame. Contrary to rumour, she fell for Porter in Africa, not Scott. Porter did not realise this, and Quin suggests he comfort the wrongly accused lady.

=== At the "Bells and Motley" ===
Satterthwaite is held up one night in the village of Kirklington Mallet when his car needs repairs. At the local pub, the "Bells and Motley", he is delighted to find Mr Quin in the coffee room. The stormy weather reminds the landlord of a local story, as it stormed the night that Captain Harwell came back with his bride. Satterthwaite knows this news story and sees this has brought him here to meet Quin. They will talk over the mystery and solve it.

Just over a year earlier, the large local house, Ashley Grange, was bought by Miss Eleanor Le Couteau, a rich young French Canadian, with a taste for collecting and for the hunt. Captain Richard Harwell stayed at the inn to take part in a fox hunt. Miss Le Couteau fell for him; two months later they were engaged, and after three months they married. After a two-week honeymoon they returned to Ashley Grange on that stormy night. Early the next morning, the Captain disappeared, seen only by their gardener, John Mathias. Suspicion fell on Stephen Grant, a young lad in Harwell's employ, but recently discharged. Nothing could be proved against him. Captain Harwell has no family, no past life that police could find. His heartbroken wife sold the Grange and all its fine contents, jewellery included, to an American millionaire to settle on the continent. The rheumatic gardener John Mathias was also suspected. His wife was the cook for the couple. He returned to their cottage twenty-five minutes after the Captain left the house, which was time enough to dispose of the body, but there is no body found. The couple left the area.

Quin prompts Satterthwaite to assess the news events of the time from a long view. Satterthwaite says crossword puzzles and cat burglars. In France, there were many unsolved thefts, including one of a collection of jewels from a French château. The chief suspects are the Clondinis, a family of three acrobats. They talk of Harwell's disappearance as being like a conjuring trick to divert public attention from what is really happening. In the case of Harwell, could the sale for cash of the Grange and all its contents have been the real trick played, and Harwell's disappearance the diversion?

Quin points out that Miss Le Couteau's past is as little known as that of Harwell, and she, her husband, and Mrs Mathias could easily be the Clondinis in disguise, staging this elaborate laundering of the proceeds of their crime. Mathias and Harwell were never seen together. An examination of the fine items in the house could provide proof, if they matched those stolen in France. Satterthwaite agrees to set the wheels in motion. Mary Jones, serving at the "Bells and Motley", in love with Stephen Grant, has a good surprise coming to her.

=== The Sign in the Sky ===
Mr Satterthwaite is attending a newsworthy trial at the Old Bailey. On the final day he hears the sentence of death against a gentleman. He eats at the expensive Arlecchino restaurant in Soho where he finds Mr Quin sitting at a table, and tells him the verdict. As Quin has not followed the trial, Satterthwaite relates the evidence. Lady Vivien Barnaby felt trapped in her marriage with her older husband, Sir George Barnaby, a man of Satterthwaite's acquaintance. Satterthwaite describes Sir George as a fussy man of fixed habits who himself rewinds the clocks in the house every Friday. She makes advances to Martin Wylde, a gentleman farmer. Wylde did enter into an affair with Lady Barnaby, but at the same time was involved in a relationship with Sylvia Dale, the daughter of the local doctor.

On the morning of Friday the 13th Lady Barnaby sent him a letter, begging him to come to her house at Deering Hill that evening at six o'clock, when her husband would be out at a bridge game. Wylde came to the house, leaving fingerprints in the room where, at 6:20 pm, Lady Barnaby was killed with a single blast from a shotgun. The servants heard the shot and rushed to the room, finding their dead mistress. They tried contacting the police, but found that the phone was out of order. One of them went on foot and met Sir George returning from his game. All of the parties involved had alibis – Sir George left his game at 6:30 pm, Sylvia Dale was at the station seeing a friend off on the 6:28 pm train, and Sir George's secretary, Henry Thompson, was in London on business. Wylde admitted that he took his gun to Deering Hill, but stated that he left it outside the door and forgot it when he left the house, after a scene with Lady Barnaby. He left the house at 6:15 pm. He took a longer than usual time to reach his home, but his reason was not believed.

Quin asks about the housemaid who gave evidence at the inquest but not at the trial, and Satterthwaite tells him that she has gone to Canada. Satterthwaite wonders if he should interview her. Satterthwaite tracks the maid, Louise Bullard, to Banff and takes the ocean voyage to Canada, and the train to Banff, where he finds her working in a hotel. She speaks of seeing the shape of a giant hand in the sky caused by the smoke of a passing train at the very time she heard the shot. She does tell Satterthwaite that Henry Thompson suggested the post in Canada to her, with its high wages, and she had to leave quickly to take it, as well as refrain from letters to her friends at Deering Hill.

Satterthwaite returns to England, meeting Quin in the Arlecchino restaurant. Satterthwaite feels he has no useful evidence, but Quin points out the train smoke that she saw. Trains use the line only at ten minutes to the hour and twenty-eight minutes past; therefore the shot could not have been fired at 6:20 pm. Satterthwaite realises that Sir George put the clocks back by ten minutes to give himself an alibi; he had intercepted his wife's note that morning. He put the telephone out of order to prevent the police from logging an emergency call against a specific time. Having heard the maid's story of the sign in the sky, he realised that she alone had evidence that could smash his alibi, and so got his secretary to get her out of the country.

Quin suggests Satterthwaite take this evidence to Sylvia Dale who has remained loyal to Wylde. Satterthwaite and she take a taxi to Sir George, where she extracts a signed confession from him to bring to the police. She said the police already knew of Louise Bullard's story, which rattled him enough to confess before the sentence on Wylde was carried out.

=== The Soul of the Croupier ===
Mr Satterthwaite is spending the first few months of the year in Monte Carlo. He is cheered by the sight of the Countess Czarnova. She has been coming there for years, sometimes in the company of royalty and titled people, rumoured to be the lover of the king of Bosnia. Her companion is a young mid-western American man, Franklin Rudge, who is enraptured with her.

Satterthwaite sees another of Rudge's party, Elizabeth Martin, who has none of the other woman's sophistication but is not innocent or naïve. She confides in Satterthwaite her misgivings concerning the Countess and Rudge. She leaves, and then Rudge joins Satterthwaite. He is enjoying his tour of Europe. He speaks of the Countess: he praises the woman herself and the exotic life she has led. Satterthwaite is more dubious of the tales she tells of her adventures in diplomatic intrigues. Soon afterwards the Countess joins them. After Rudge has gone, Satterthwaite receives the impression that he is being warned off by the Countess. She means to have Rudge and she perceives Satterthwaite as an impediment to her plans. He is puzzled as to why she pursues the young American when she appears to have everything that she desires, with her fine clothes and exquisite jewels.

Satterthwaite is delighted to receive his old friend, Harley Quin. Satterthwaite tells Quin of the relationships he is observing; the Countess, for reasons best known to her, is coming between Franklin Rudge and Elizabeth Martin. The following night at the casino the Countess wears a simple white gown and no jewelry, and a younger woman is rumoured to be the lover of the king of Bosnia. The Countess wagers all she has at the roulette table.

As Satterthwaite bets on 5, she bets on 6. The ball lands on 5 but the croupier passes the winnings to the Countess. Satterthwaite accepts the croupier's decision. Quin commiserates with him and invites him to a supper party that night at a bohemian café called La Caveau, with candle light. Each guest is to bring the first person he sees to the supper party.

Satterthwaite arrives with Elizabeth. Rudge arrives with the Countess while Quin brings the casino's croupier Pierre Vaucher. Vaucher tells the story of a jeweller who worked in Paris many years ago who, despite being engaged, fell for a half-starved girl and married her. His family disowned him, and over the next two years he realised what a mistake he had made, as the woman made his life a misery and left him. She reappeared two years later, dressed in rich clothes and fabulous jewels, and he asked if she was coming back to him. She left again and the man sank further into drunkenness, eventually saved by the discipline of the army during the First World War. The man eventually became a croupier at a casino and saw her, in a reduced state – as her jewels were paste replicas to his trained eye, and she was again on the edge of destitution. He passed another man's winnings to her.

At this point in the story, the Countess jumps up and cries, "Why?" Vaucher smiles and replies that it was pity that made him do it. She offers to light his cigarette, using a spill to do so. She leaves and Vaucher realises that the spill is the fifty thousand franc note, her winnings and all she has in the world. Too proud to accept charity, she burnt it in front of his eyes. Vaucher follows her. Rudge realizes he does not understand the Countess and turns his attentions back to Elizabeth. Quin and Satterthwaite are satisfied.

=== The Man from the Sea ===
This story closely resembles part of Christie's Mary Westmacott novel Unfinished Business.

Mr Satterthwaite is on holiday on a Spanish island. He often goes to the garden of a villa called La Paz, which stands on a high cliff overlooking the sea. He loves the garden but the villa, which is shuttered and seems empty, intrigues him.

After exchanging pleasantries with the gardener, Satterthwaite makes his way to the cliff edge and soon hears approaching footsteps. It is a young man in his eyes, a man of forty. The man says he expected to be alone. He tells Satterthwaite that he came here the previous night and found someone there seemingly in fancy dress, in "a kind of Harlequin rig". Satterthwaite is surprised at this mention of his old friend and tells his new acquaintance that Mr Quin's appearances usually presage revelations and discoveries. The younger man comments that his appearance seemed very sudden, as if he came from the sea.

Anthony Cosden introduces himself and tells Satterthwaite of his life; he has been told that he has six months to live. He visited the island about twenty years before, and makes clear he wants to die here by leaping off the cliff. Satterthwaite asks, "You will not do it tonight, to spare me suspicion of pushing you?" Cosden agrees. Satterthwaite makes the case for living, but Cosden is resolute.

Cosden leaves and Satterthwaite approaches the villa. Pulling open one of the closed shutters, he sees a troubled woman in traditional Spanish dress looking at him. He stammers an apology which makes the woman realise that he is English, and she calls him back. She, too, is English, and she invites him into the house for tea as she wishes to talk to someone. She unburdens herself to Satterthwaite, telling him that she has lived here for the last twenty-three years, for all but the first year as a widow. She married an Englishman when she was eighteen and they moved into the villa. The marriage proved to be a dreadful mistake as her husband gloried in making her miserable, and their baby was stillborn. Some girls staying in the local hotel dared him to swim in the dangerous sea at the base of the cliff. He drowned and his body was battered against the rocks as his wife watched.

Soon afterwards, she had a brief affair with a young Englishman who was visiting the island, the result of which was a son. He is now grown up and happy. He is serious about a girl whose parents want to know his antecedents, and she has never told him he is illegitimate. To save him pain and scandal, she is planning to commit suicide to hide the truth from him forever. Again, Satterthwaite finds himself persuading someone to live. He asks her to take no action for twenty-four hours, but to leave the shutter he opened unlatched and to wait there tonight. He returns to the hotel, finds Cosden, and refers obliquely to the shutter on the villa that he opened. Cosden understands his meaning and leaves.

The next day Satterthwaite returns to La Paz and finds the Englishwoman there, her appearance transformed with happiness. She and Cosden, reunited after twenty years, are to be married that day by the Consul, and she will introduce her son to his father. She refuses to believe that Cosden will die. She will make sure he lives.

Satterthwaite walks to the cliff top and is not surprised to find Quin there. Quin tells him that the man who drowned in the sea twenty years ago truly loved his wife – almost to the point of madness – and the desire to make amends for past transgressions can sometimes be so strong that a messenger can be found. As Satterthwaite leaves, Quin walks back towards the cliff edge, disappearing from view.

=== The Voice in the Dark ===
Mr Satterthwaite is on the French Riviera at Cannes with Lady Stranleigh, someone he has known since his youth. She is "beautiful, unscrupulous, completely callous, interested solely in herself." She came into her family title of baroness after the deaths of the last Lord Stranleigh's two brothers and his only nephew, the tragic death of her elder sister Beatrice in the shipwreck of the Uralia off the coast of New Zealand, and then the death of Lord Stranleigh. Lady Stranleigh asks Satterthwaite to check on her daughter, Margery, as he is returning to England. Lately she reports hearing voices in the night at Abbot's Mede in Wiltshire. Margery is seeking psychic researchers and Satterthwaite knows how to handle them. On the train home, Satterthwaite meets Mr Quin. Quin tells him that he will be at the "Bells and Motley" inn where Satterthwaite can call on him.

At Abbot's Mede, Margery tells Satterthwaite that she hears "Give back what is not yours. Give back what you have stolen." She switches on the light, but she is alone. The long time servant Clayton sleeps in the next room now, but she has not heard the voices when Margery does. The night before he arrived, Margery dreamt that a spike was entering her throat and the voice murmured, "You have stolen what is mine. This is death!" Margery screamed and found a mark on her neck—no dream. Satterthwaite speaks with Clayton, a blue-eyed, grey-haired woman who also survived the Uralia, who is alarmed at the events of last night. Margery's friend Marcia Keane and a family cousin Roley Vavasour have been staying at the house since the voices started.

Lady Stranleigh writes to thank Margery for the chocolates she sent and tells her that she has been laid low by food poisoning. Margery tells Satterthwaite she did not send her mother chocolates, but neither she nor her mother make the connection that Satterthwaite does, that the mysterious chocolates are the source of the food poisoning. Roley organizes a séance, with the spiritualist Mrs Casson and the medium Mrs Lloyd. After speaking to the medium's spirit guide, the voice of Lady Stranleigh's sister Beatrice comes through. Satterthwaite tries her with a question from long ago that only she will know, and she answers correctly. The spirit of Beatrice says "Give back what is not yours."

Roley is the next heir to the title and estates should Lady Stranleigh die. He has asked Margery to marry him but she has refused, being engaged to the local curate. Lady Stranleigh wires that she is arriving home early, so Satterthwaite returns to London. Once there, he learns that Lady Stranleigh was found dead in her bath at Abbot's Mede. He returns to Wiltshire but stops at the "Bells and Motley" where he finds Mr Quin. His friend listens to the entire tale but tells Satterthwaite that he has solved these matters himself before when he is in full possession of the facts, and he can do so now. In Abbot's Mede, the sad Margery is drawing up a new will and asks him to be the second witness, Clayton being the first. Alice Clayton, her full name, reminds Satterthwaite she is the same maid who, many years earlier, he had kissed in a hotel's passage. He remembers Alice had brown eyes. He tells Margery that the woman she knows as Clayton, with blue eyes, is her Aunt Beatrice. She has a scar where she was struck on the head during the sinking of the Uralia and he imagines this blow destroyed her memory at the time. Her avaricious sister used the opportunity to say her elder sister drowned so she might inherit the family money. It is only now that Beatrice's memory is returning, thus persecuting her niece, and then killing her younger sister. The two go to Clayton's room but find the woman dead from heart failure. As Satterthwaite says, "Perhaps it is best that way."

=== The Face of Helen ===
Mr Satterthwaite is at the Royal Opera House in Covent Garden. Not caring for Cavalleria Rusticana, he deliberately arrives late so as to see only Pagliacci. He arrives just before the interval, when he bumps into Mr Quin. He invites Quin to watch the second opera with him in his private box, from where they spot an absolutely beautiful-looking girl in the stalls before the lights go down. In the next interval they spot the girl sitting with an earnest-looking young man, and see that they are joined by another young man whose arrival appears to have generated some tension in the group.

At the end of the evening Satterthwaite makes his own way to where his chauffeur-driven car is parked when he again sees the three people from the Opera House. Almost immediately a fight breaks out between the two young men and Satterthwaite rescues the girl from the fracas. At her home, she tells him her name is Gillian West, the intense man is Philip Eastney, and the other is Charlie Burns; and she hopes that Eastney has not hurt Burns. Satterthwaite promises to find out and assuage her fears.

The next Sunday, Satterthwaite is in Kew Gardens when his path again crosses that of Gillian West and Charlie Burns, and he finds that the two have just become engaged. Gillian is nervous of the effect the news will have on Philip Eastney, and Charlie confides that, in the past, men have lost their heads over his fiancée and done stupid things as a result. The next Thursday, Satterthwaite goes back to Chelsea at Gillian's invitation and has tea with her. To her relief, Eastney has accepted the news with good grace and given her two wedding presents. One is a new radio and the other is an unusual glass sculpture which is topped off by a bubble-like iridescent ball. Eastney has also made a strange request – that Gillian stay at home tonight and listen to the broadcast of music on the radio.

Satterthwaite is uneasy as he leaves Gillian, feeling that the appearance of Quin at Covent Garden must mean that there is unusual business afoot, but he cannot place exactly what is going to happen. Wanting to discuss his fears with Quin, he goes to the Arlecchino restaurant where he met him once before (in The Sign in the Sky). Quin is not there, but Eastney is, and the two men talk – the younger man regaling Satterthwaite with tales of working in the testing and manufacture of poison gas during the war.

Leaving the restaurant, Satterthwaite is still uneasy. He buys a paper for that evening's radio programmes and realises that Gillian West is in great danger. He rushes to her flat and drags her out before the tenor's voice reaches a peak during a performance of "The Shepherd's Song". A stray cat goes through the door to the flat and is found dead – killed by the gasses freed from the glass ball when it shattered as a result of the tenor singing.

Satterthwaite meets Eastney who is pacing on the Chelsea Embankment and tells him that he and Gillian removed a dead cat from the flat, i.e. that Eastney's plan failed. The two men part, and a few minutes later a policeman asks Satterthwaite if he also heard what seemed like the sound of a large splash. The police officer says he figures it is another person committing suicide.

=== The Dead Harlequin ===
Mr Satterthwaite attends a showing at an art gallery by the rising young artist Frank Bristow. There he sees a painting called "The Dead Harlequin" which portrays a dead figure on a floor, and the same figure looking in through an open window at his own corpse. The man portrayed is Mr Harley Quin and the room shown is the Terrace Room at Charnley, a house owned by Lord Charnley which Satterthwaite has visited. He buys the picture and meets the artist, whom he invites for dinner that night at his house. The artist joins Satterthwaite and Colonel Monkton who was at Charnley the night fourteen years earlier when the previous Lord Charnley committed suicide.

The house has a ghostly history, with the spectre of Charles I walking headless on the terrace and a weeping lady with a silver ewer seen whenever there is a tragedy in the family. The last death occurred at a fancy dress ball to celebrate the return from honeymoon of Lord Charnley and his new bride. Colonel Monkton was one of several people who stood at the top of a flight of stairs and saw Lord Charnley pass below. A woman called out to him but he walked on as if in a daze. He passed through the Terrace Room and into the Oak Parlour that leads off it. Legends attached to the Oak Parlour include one of Charles I hiding in a priest hole there; duels taking place, with the bullet holes still in the wall; and a strange stain on the floor which reappears even when the wood is replaced. The people on the stairs heard the door lock behind him and then a shot. They could not get into the Oak Parlour so they broke the door down to find the body with curiously little blood coming from it. Alix, Lord Charnley's widow, was pregnant and when their son was born, he automatically inherited, so no others gained by this death.

Satterthwaite receives an unexpected guest – Aspasia Glen, the celebrated performer. She wants to buy "The Dead Harlequin". Satterthwaite is pleased when Alix Charnley telephones him part way through their conversation, also wanting to buy the picture. Satterthwaite asks Alix Charnley to come round to the house immediately. He introduces Miss Glen to his other guests and is not surprised to see that Mr Quin has arrived. When Alix joins them, she recognises Miss Glen. They relive that dreadful night and now, after fourteen years, Alix reveals that the reason for the suicide was a letter Lord Charnley received from a guest telling him that she was pregnant by him – just a month after his marriage to Alix. Monkton thinks that explains all, but Satterthwaite wants to know why Bristow's picture portrays the dead figure in the Terrace Room and not in the Oak Parlour. This suicide may be a murder. He thinks the death occurred there and the body was put in the Oak Parlour afterwards.

Satterthwaite points out the figure seen in fancy dress could have been anyone. The only person who called him "Lord Charnley" was the woman who was allegedly pregnant by him, Monica Ford, in league with Hugo Charnley, hoping to be the Lord himself. A shot fired in the locked room would be just another bullet hole in the wall like those created by past duels, and there is a priest hole to hide the person just seen entering the room. Any bloodstain on the floor of the Terrace Room would have been covered by a red Bokhara rug which was placed there on that night only, and the body then moved into the Oak Parlour. The stains could have been cleaned up by a lady with a jug and basin and if anyone saw her, she would have been taken for the resident ghost.

Satterthwaite accuses and Alix recognises Miss Glen as Monica Ford who called out Lord Charnley's name that night. The accused woman rushes out of Satterthwaite's house after confessing that she loved Hugo, and helped him with the murder, but he abandoned her soon after and is dead now. Alix is relieved, coming alive again. The letter to her husband was false. She can tell her son that his father has no stain on his reputation. When the artist prepares to leave, Mr Quin has already slipped away. Frank Bristow may pursue the charming Alix.

=== The Bird with the Broken Wing ===
Mr Satterthwaite longs to return to the comforts of his London home, when the other guests spell out the results of their table-turning as QUIN followed by LAIDELL. He reverses his view, and calls hostess Madge Keeley to resurrect his invitation to Laidell, another house party in the country. Arriving at Laidell, he learns that Madge is soon to announce her engagement. She quietly points out Roger Graham to him at dinner. David Keeley, a brilliant mathematician but socially quiet man affectionately called the invisible man, is Madge's father. Among the guests are Roger's mother Mrs Graham, Doris Coles, and Mabelle and Gerard Annesley. Mabelle strikes Satterthwaite as "The Bird with the Broken Wing". He notices that Roger seems distracted, and later hears from Mabelle that earlier in the day she saw a figure in the woods who could only have been Mr Quin. Taking this as his cue to speak with her, he finds out that she is blissfully happy. Gerard fetches her to play for the group on her ukulele. The party breaks up for the night, heading to their respective rooms.

In the morning, the household wakes to the news that Mabelle is dead, found by a maid hanging on the back of her bedroom door. The police arrive. Inspector Winkfield conducts the investigation, an old acquaintance of Satterthwaite. The night before, Madge prompted Mabelle to fetch her ukulele from the drawing room, and that is the last that anyone saw her. Gerard Annesley fell asleep in his adjoining room before he heard his wife return, hearing no sounds in the night.

Satterthwaite insists she did not kill herself but was murdered. The inspector questions him alone, confirms his suspicions, and asks for his help. The rope which they found around her neck was much thicker than the marks of the cord that killed her. Thinking carefully, Satterthwaite remembers seeing smoke coming from under Mrs Graham's door. He investigates the cause. He finds some incompletely burnt letters in the grate; there are enough fragments to show they are from Mabelle to Roger about an affair between them. He confronts Mrs Graham, who admits that she burnt them to prevent trouble for her engaged son. Roger says he did not kill Mabelle, and admits he had been bewitched by her, but had not told her it was ended last night.

Satterthwaite finds Mabelle's ukulele and strums it. It is out of tune; Doris tunes it, but breaks the string, noticing it is an A-string, one size too large. Satterthwaite suddenly realises that the murder was committed with the original string, and confronts quiet David Keeley in the library. He was the last person downstairs, switching off the lights as Mabelle returned for her instrument. He quickly killed her and then later in the night returned to move the body to her own room. Why did he do it? Laughing insanely about how no one notices him, Keeley admits the crime as Winkfield walks into the room.

Satterthwaite meets Quin on the train home. He sadly admits he failed to prevent Mabelle's death. Quin replies that he did save the two young men from being wrongly accused of the crime, and asks if there are not greater evils than death. Satterthwaite closes his eyes, thinking of Mabelle, and when he opens his eyes, Mr Quin has already gone; but there is a bird carved from a blue stone where Quin had been seated, an enchanting piece of art.

=== The World's End ===
Mr Satterthwaite is in Corsica with the Duchess of Leith, a strong and generous woman who can be miserly on the small expenses. At their first meal, the duchess spots Naomi Carlton Smith, a young artist who is a cousin to her. She was involved with a young writer who, the year before, was accused of stealing jewellery and imprisoned. Mr Satterthwaite likes her art, and buys a drawing from her. The three arrange a picnic for the next day with a fourth person, Mr Tomlinson, who has a car. At the appointed time they drive up into the mountains and eventually stop where the road finishes at an isolated coastal village of the name of Coti-Chiavari, which Naomi Smith terms "the World's End". There, Satterthwaite is delighted to see Mr Quin sitting on a boulder and looking out to sea. He has a feeling that Quin has turned up "in the nick of time". The group has brought a picnic with them, but as it is starting to snow they find a rough stone shelter wherein they find three other visitors from England: Vyse, the theatrical producer, Rosina Nunn the famous actress and her husband, Mr Judd. They are also enjoying a picnic and the two parties settle down to eat.

During the conversation that ensues, Miss Nunn admits to her constant habit of being absentminded and the occasion she lost her opal to a thief. The thief was Alec Gerard, a young playwright, who took it from her when she showed it to him at the theatre. Although the jewel was not found on him, he was unable to satisfactorily account for a large sum of money that appeared in his bank account the next day. Mr Quin comes to the shelter to keep Miss Smith part of the group; he will not let her wander off alone. Miss Nunn has cause to empty her bag; from it comes a wooden box that Mr Tomlinson recognises as an Indian Box. Realising that no one knows the true nature of such an item, Tomlinson shows the group how the box contains a secret compartment and the movements to both hide and recover a small item. They are all startled when the missing opal falls from the box. Miss Nunn understands immediately that she must undo the wrong done to Gerard. With her lover vindicated, Naomi Smith is relieved, and no longer threatens to kill herself. Satterthwaite and Quin again bid each other goodbye at the cliff's edge.

=== Harlequin's Lane ===
Mr Satterthwaite has accepted an invitation to stay at the country house of a couple called Denham. They are not part of his usual circles of friends, but they have an appeal. John Denham is forty and he rescued his wife, Anna, from the Russian Revolution. The couple are out when he arrives, so Mr Satterthwaite passes the time by going for a walk in the garden. He progresses to a lane called "Harlequin's Lane" that borders the grounds. He is not surprised to meet Quin, whom he finds is also staying with the Denhams. They walk down the lane, known locally as "Lover's Lane", to its termination, a former quarry which is now a rubbish tip. Returning to the house they meet a young girl in the lane called Molly Stanwell who lives in the area. She is part of the local entertainment, a masquerade to be held that night. Part of the masquerade is an enactment of the Commedia dell'arte for which two professional dancers are coming down from London to play the parts of Harlequin and Columbine.

At dinner the conversation turns to the Soviet state and the tragic loss of the ballerina Kharsanova by the Bolsheviks in the early days of the revolution. After dinner, Anna calls to learn if the dancers have arrived yet, only to learn that they have been injured in a car crash. Prince Sergius Oranoff drove the car, and arrives later. Anna knows Oranoff, and seems quite happy in his presence. Satterthwaite likes him for his knowledge of the arts. In the evening Satterthwaite sees two lovers in the lane, Molly with John Denham. Anna sees them too, and stays with Satterthwaite for support.

Anna dances the role of Columbine while Quin dances as Harlequin. The performance is a success. Satterthwaite recognises by her dancing that Anna is the lost Kharsanova. In the darkness of the garden, she tells Satterthwaite that she gave up dancing because John wanted a wife and she loved John. She says now she will change to being with one who loved her so many years. Anna tells Satterthwaite after her dance, "I know, my friend, I know. But there is no third way. Always one looks for one thing--the lover, the perfect, the eternal lover... It is the music of Harlequin one hears. No lover ever satisfies one, for all lovers are mortal. And Harlequin is only a myth, an invisible presence... unless------" ... "Unless--his name is--Death!"

Oranoff expects to meet Anna that night. Satterthwaite sees Anna and a figure dressed as Harlequin in Lovers' Lane; the Harlequin is Mr Quin but somehow with a face like Denham had ten years earlier, when he was still adventurous. Anna's maid saw her go by, but saw her walk alone, which greatly confuses Satterthwaite. He is afraid for Anna, so he and Oranoff rush down to the tip where they see Anna's dead body. Quin turns up and Satterthwaite asks why the maid could not see Mr Quin as he could. Quin replies that since Satterthwaite has never passed down Lovers' Lane (known love) himself, he can see things other people cannot. Quin then asks Satterthwaite if he regrets this. Satterthwaite suddenly feels terribly afraid of Quin, but ultimately answers that he has no regrets. When he turns to him again, Quin has vanished.

== Literary significance and reception ==
The Times Literary Supplement review of 29 May 1930 failed to comment on the merits of the book, confining itself to summarising the relationship between Quin and Satterthwaite and concluding that the latter is helped "to solve old mysteries, sometimes to restore happiness to the unfortunate, and sometimes to see, if not avert, impending tragedy".

The New York Times Book Review of 4 May 1930 started by saying, "To call the tales in this collection detective stories would be misleading. For though all of them deal with mystery and some of them with crime, they are, nevertheless, more like fairy tales." The anonymous reviewer described Mr Satterthwaite and Mr Quin and their relationship to the stories and each other, and then concluded, "The book offers a rare treat for the discriminating reader."

In the Daily Express (25 April 1930), Harold Nicolson said, "Mr. Quinn and Mr. Satterthwaite are, to me, new characters, and I should like much more of them. Mrs. Christie always writes intelligently, and I enjoyed these stories as much as any she has written."

Robert Barnard wrote: "An odd collection, with the whimsical-supernatural element strong, though not always unpleasing. There are some notably dreadful stories (Bird with the Broken Wing, Voice in the Dark) but the unusual number of erudite or cultural references bears witness to Christie's own opinion of these stories – they were aimed more 'up-market' than usual."

== References and allusions ==
=== References to other works ===
- The character of Mr Harley Quin is clearly based upon Harlequin from the 16th century Italian Commedia dell'arte. The earlier versions of the character were that of a clown or fool, but in the 18th century the character changed to become a romantic hero. In "The Coming of Mr. Quin", Quin tells Satterthwaite "I must recommend the Harlequinade to your attention. It is dying out nowadays – but it repays attention, I assure you." The Harlequinade was the still-later British stage version, in which Harlequin has magical powers, and brings about changes of scenery by a touch of his slapstick. Christie also refers to the Harlequin character in the "Masque from Italy" sequence of poems in her 1925 collection The Road of Dreams (reprinted in 1973 in Poems), and in her first-ever published magazine short story "The Affair at the Victory Ball" (1923) (here, in the Commedia dell'arte version of the characters), published in book form in the US collection The Under Dog and Other Stories (1951) and in the UK in Poirot's Early Cases (1974). In most of the stories in The Mysterious Mr Quin, Christie makes connections between the appearance of Quin and the traditional costume of Harlequin, the latter being a dark mask and clothing composed of multi-coloured diamond-shapes, as featured on the cover of the UK first edition of the book.

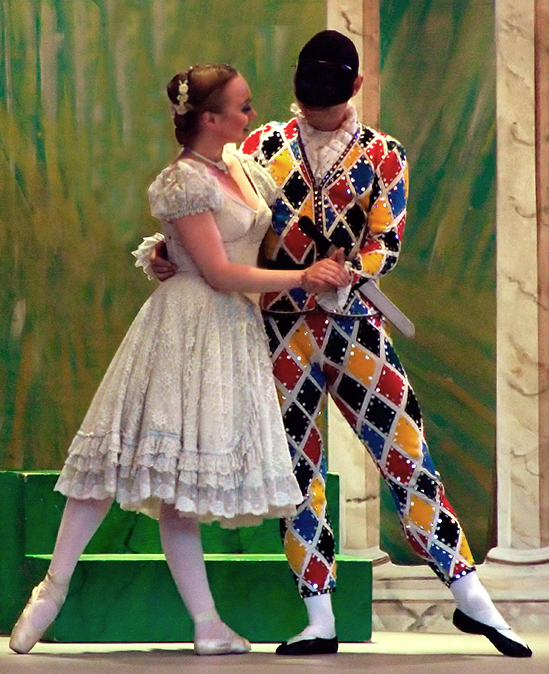
The traditional image of Harlequin as portrayed in a Danish production of the Commedia dell'arte.

- In "The Shadow on the Glass", the ill-fated Captain Allenson states that Mr and Mrs Scott are "doing the turtle dove stunt", thereby referring to the bird as a symbol of love. The name of house in the story – Greenway's House – is possibly derived from the name of Christie's future home, Greenway House, on the banks on the River Dart in Devon. Although Christie did not purchase the house until 1938, she had been aware of its existence since childhood.
- The Arlecchino restaurant features in both "The Sign in the Sky" and "The Face of Helen" as a place where Quin states he often goes. The word "Arlecchino" is Italian for "Harlequin".
- In "The Face of Helen", Quin states that there are reasons why he is attracted to the opera Pagliacci. This opera (whose name translates in Italian as "Clowns") depicts a group of performers of the Commedia dell'arte in which Harlequin is one of the chief characters. The opera is also referenced in "Swan Song", the final story in the 1934 collection The Listerdale Mystery.
- In "The Bird with the Broken Wing", one of the songs that Mabelle Annesley plays and sings is "The Swan" by Edvard Grieg (En Svane from Op. 25 [No. 2] Six poems by Henrik Ibsen).
- In "Harlequin's Lane", the lyrics of the "old Irish ballad" that Molly Stanwell sings are in fact from Christie's own poem "Dark Sheila", first printed in the Poetry Today issue for May/June 1919 and later reprinted in her collections The Road of Dreams (1925) and Poems (1973).
- In "Harlequin's Lane", Satterthwaite says to Quin, "Bring me the two most beautiful things in the city, said God. You know how it goes, eh?" He refers to the Happy Prince of Oscar Wilde in which God gives this order to an angel.

=== References to actual history, geography and current science ===
In "The Dead Harlequin", the character of Aspasia Glen is an early attempt by Christie to portray the acclaimed American monologist Ruth Draper (1884–1956). She re-used and enlarged upon the idea in her 1933 novel Lord Edgware Dies with the character of Carlotta Adams.

The story "The Man from the Sea" was written in Puerto de la Cruz in the island of Tenerife in the Canary Islands. The Villa La Paz still exists, and is one of the heritage-listed buildings in the town. Unluckily, the "cypresses walk" has been detached from the garden by a new road, but there are still commanding and impressive views of the ocean and the cliff.

=== References in other works ===
Christie re-uses the plot device of the train smoke from "The Sign in the Sky" as an alibi in Taken at the Flood (1948).

== Adaptations ==
"The Coming of Mr Quin", the first short story in the Anthology, would be adapted into film as The Passing of Mr. Quinn in 1928, directed by Julius Hagen and Leslie S. Hiscott and adapted by Hiscott. The cast included:

- Stewart Rome ... Dr Alec Portal
- Trilby Clark ... Mrs Eleanor Appleby
- Ursula Jeans ... Vera, the Maid
- Clifford Heatherley ... Professor Appleby
- Mary Brough ... Cook
- Vivian Baron ... Derek Cappel
- Kate Gurney ... Landlady

The film, in turn, was "novelized" as The Passing of Mr. Quinn by G. Roy McRae (London Book Company, 1929).

The (unpublished) play Someone at the Window (1934) was adapted by Christie from the short story "The Dead Harlequin".

A series of abridged readings of three of the stories ("The Coming of Mr Quin", "The Soul of the Croupier", "At the 'Bells and Motley'") were broadcast 15–17 September 2009 on BBC Radio 4 as part of the Afternoon Readings program and performed by Martin Jarvis. A second series of abridged readings ("The World's End", "The Face of Helen", "The Sign in the Sky") was broadcast 15–17 September 2010, with a third set ("The Dead Harlequin", "The Man from the Sea", "Harlequin's Lane") broadcast 6–8 September 2011, both performed again by Jarvis. The readings have since been rebroadcast on BBC Radio 4 Extra.

== Other appearances of Harley Quin or Mr Satterthwaite ==
In Agatha Christie's Autobiography, she claims that Quin and Satterthwaite became two of her favourite characters. The latter appeared in Three Act Tragedy (a 1935 Poirot novel in which Satterthwaite makes an appearance) and very briefly in the novella "Dead Man's Mirror", included in the 1937 collection of four novellas Murder in the Mews. Quin appeared in two further short stories: "The Harlequin Tea Set" (which was the last short story Christie ever wrote) and "The Love Detectives", both included in the 1992 UK collection Problem at Pollensa Bay. In the US, the former story appeared as the title story in the 1997 collection The Harlequin Tea Set and the latter in the earlier 1950 collection Three Blind Mice and Other Stories.

"The Love Detectives", "The Harlequin Tea Set", Three Act Tragedy and "Dead Man's Mirror" were included in the collection The Complete Quin and Satterthwaite: Love Detectives (UK, HarperCollins; ISBN 978-0-00-717115-6).

== Publication history ==
- 1930, William Collins and Sons (London), 14 April 1930, Hardcover, 288 pp
- 1930, Dodd Mead and Company (New York), 1930, Hardcover, 290 pp
- c. 1930, Lawrence E. Spivak, Abridged edition, 126 pp
- 1943, Dodd Mead and Company, (as part of the Triple Threat along with Poirot Investigates and Partners in Crime), Hardcover
- 1950, Dell Books (New York), Paperback, (Dell number 570 [mapback]), 256 pp
- 1953, Penguin Books, Paperback, (Penguin number 931), 250 pp
- 1965, Fontana Books (Imprint of HarperCollins), Paperback, 255 pp
- 1973, Pan Books, Paperback, 256 pp; ISBN 0-330-23457-9
- 1977, Ulverscroft large-print Edition, Hardcover, 457 pp; ISBN 0-85456-546-9
- 1984, Berkley Books, Paperback, 246 pp; Berkley number 06795-5
- 2010, HarperCollins; Facsimile edition, Hardcover: 288 pages; ISBN 978-0-00-735464-1
- 2017, HarperCollins, Paperback; ISBN 978-0-00-715484-5

Chapters from the book appeared in Agatha Christie's Crime Reader, published by Cleveland Publishing in 1944, along with other selections from Poirot Investigates and Partners in Crime.

Actor Hugh Fraser was the reader of the unabridged recording of The Mysterious Mr Quin released in 2006 by BBC Audiobooks America (ISBN 978-1572705296) and HarperCollins in 2005 (ISBN 978-0007189717) and 2007 (ISBN 978-0007212583). ISIS Audio Books released an unabridged recording in 1993 read by Geoffrey Matthews (ISBN 978-1856956758).

=== First publication of stories ===
Unlike the other stories, "The Bird with the Broken Wing" did not appear in a magazine beforehand. The first UK magazine publication listing of the other stories is as follows:

- "The Coming of Mr Quin": First published as "The Passing of Mr Quin" in issue 229 of the Grand Magazine in March 1924.
- "The Shadow on the Glass": First published in issue 236 of the Grand Magazine in October 1924.
- "The Sign in the Sky": First published under the slightly different title of "A Sign in the Sky" in issue 245 of the Grand Magazine in July 1925.
- "At the Bells and Motley": First published as "A Man of Magic" in issue 249 of the Grand Magazine in November 1925.
- "The Soul of the Croupier": First published in issue 237 of "The Story-Teller" magazine in January 1927.
- "The World's End": First published under the slightly abbreviated title of "World's End" in issue 238 of The Story-Teller magazine in February 1927
- "The Voice in the Dark": First published in issue 239 of The Story-Teller magazine in March 1927.
- "The Face of Helen": First published in issue 240 of The Story-Teller magazine in April 1927.
- "Harlequin's Lane": First published in issue 241 of The Story-Teller magazine in May 1927.
- "The Dead Harlequin": First published in issue 289 of the Grand Magazine in March 1929.
- "The Man From the Sea": First published in volume 1, number 6 of Britannia and Eve magazine in October 1929. The story was illustrated by Steven Spurrier.

The five stories in The Story-teller magazine above were part of a six-story sequence titled The Magic of Mr Quin. The sixth story in the sequence (and the first to be published) was "At the Crossroads" in issue 236 in December 1926. The story was published in the US in Flynn's Weekly in October 1926 (Volume XIX, Number 3). Retitled "The Love Detectives", the story appeared in book form in the US in 1950 in Three Blind Mice and Other Stories and in the UK in Problem at Pollensa Bay and Other Stories in 1991.

A partial listing of the first US magazine publications is as follows:

- "The Coming of Mr Quin": March 1925 (Volume LXXXIV, Number 2) issue of Munsey's Magazine under the title "Mr Quinn Passes By"; the story was not illustrated.
- "The Sign in the Sky": August 1925 (Volume III, Number 4) issue of Police Magazine, with illustrations by F. A. Hamilton.
- "At the Bells and Motley": 17 July 1926 (Volume XVI, Number 6) issue of Flynn's Weekly with an uncredited illustration.
- "The Soul of the Croupier": 13 November 1926 (Volume XIX, Number 5) issue of Flynn's Weekly with an uncredited illustration.
- "The World's End": 20 November 1926 (Volume XIX, Number 6) issue of Flynn's Weekly with an uncredited illustration.
- "The Voice in the Dark": 4 December 1926 (Volume XX, Number 1) issue of Flynn's Weekly with an uncredited illustration.
- "The Face of Helen": 6 August 1927 issue of Detective Story Magazine.
- "Harlequin's Lane": 27 August 1927 (Volume XXVI, Number 4) issue of Flynn's Weekly.
- "The Dead Harlequin": 22 June 1929 (Volume 42, Number 3) issue of Detective Fiction Weekly with an uncredited illustration.

=== Book dedication ===
Christie's dedication in the book reads: "To Harlequin the invisible". This dedication is unusual for two reasons; first, few of her short story collections carried a dedication and, second, it is the only time that Christie dedicated a book to a fictional character.

=== Dustjacket blurb ===
The blurb of the first edition (which is carried on both the back of the dustjacket and opposite the title page) reads:

Mr Satterthwaite is a dried-up elderly little man who has never known romance or adventure himself. He is a looker-on at life. But he feels an increasing desire to play a part in the drama of other people – especially is he drawn to mysteries of unsolved crime. And here he has a helper – the mysterious Mr Quin – the man who appears from nowhere – who 'comes and goes' like the invisible Harlequin of old. Who is Mr Quin? No one knows, but he is one who 'speaks for the dead who cannot speak for themselves', and he is also a friend to lovers. Prompted by his mystic influence, Mr Satterthwaite plays a real part in life at last, and unravels mysteries that seem incapable of solution. In Mr Quin, Agatha Christie has created a character as fascinating as Hercule Poirot himself.
