= Passenger to Frankfurt =

1970 spy novel by Agatha Christie

- First edition (UK)
- Author: Agatha Christie
- Language: English
- Genre: Spy novel
- Publisher: Collins Crime Club (UK); Dodd, Mead (US)
- Publication date: September 1970
- Publication place: United Kingdom
- Media type: Print (hardback & paperback)
- Pages: 256 (first edition, hardcover)
- ISBN: 0-00-231121-6
- OCLC: 119946
- Dewey Decimal: 823/.9/12
- LC Class: PZ3.C4637 Pas PR6005.H66
- Preceded by: Hallowe'en Party
- Followed by: Nemesis

Passenger to Frankfurt: An Extravaganza is a spy novel by Agatha Christie first published in the United Kingdom by the Collins Crime Club in September 1970 and in the United States by Dodd, Mead and Company later in the same year. The UK edition retailed at twenty-five shillings. In preparation for decimalisation on 15 February 1971, it was concurrently priced on the dustjacket at £1.25. The US edition retailed at $5.95.

It was published to mark Christie's eightieth birthday and, by counting up both UK and US short-story collections to reach the desired total, was also advertised as her eightieth book. It is the last of her spy novels.

At the beginning of the book there is a quote by Jan Smuts, "Leadership, besides being a great creative force, can be diabolical ...". There is also an author's introduction on the writing of the story, which concludes, "This story is in essence a fantasy. It pretends to be nothing more. But most of the things that happen in it are happening, or giving promise of happening in the world of today. It is not an impossible story - it is only a fantastic one."

Sir Stafford Nye, a middle-aged diplomat, steps into the world of spies, double agents, and secret groups to effect a change in international power centres. He meets a woman who has selected him to aid her at a crucial point, when a weather delay changes where her and his aeroplane flight lands before proceeding to England. There is much commentary on the changes in the world, especially college age youth in Europe, the United States, and South America, in the late 1960s.

The novel received mixed reviews at publication and in 1990. In 2017, it was assessed favourably in an essay about speculative spy thriller novels by women. It is one of only four Christie novels not to have received an adaptation of any kind, the others being Death Comes as the End, Destination Unknown and Postern of Fate.

== Plot summary ==
Sir Stafford Nye's flight home from Malaya takes an unexpected twist, when a woman approaches him in the Frankfurt Airport. The woman claims that her life is in danger, and that she needs his help. Nye agrees to lend her his travelling cloak, passport, and boarding ticket. A colleague in London, Horsham of Security, tells Nye that his action in Frankfurt saved Mary Ann's life; Sir Stafford heard another name announced for her at the airport, Daphne Theodofanous. Nye has dinner with his friend Eric, worried for his professional reputation. Mary Ann returns his passport, taped into a magazine in his post. Nye advertises in the personals section of the newspaper for his mystery woman, signing himself as Passenger to Frankfurt. She replies with tickets to an opera, given at a discreet meeting on a bridge. His great-aunt Matilda hints to him of a terrible world-wide conspiracy, which uses a phrase of music from Richard Wagner, related to the opera Siegfried (1876). Matilda detects that he has a woman in his life now.

The opera is Siegfried, part of The Ring of the Nibelung by Wagner. The mystery woman attends only the second half, leaving Nye the tune for young Siegfried marked on a copy of the program, a motif for what she is doing. He attends an embassy party, given by the American ambassador and his wife, Sam and Mildred Cortman. Mary Ann is there, under her real name, Countess Renata Zerkowski. She offers Nye a ride home, but takes him instead to the home of Mr Robinson the financier, where they meet Colonel Pikeaway, Lord Altamount, James Kleek and Horsham. Nye is not seen for a while, as he has been accepted by the close-knit group of British intelligence to aid in accomplishing the tasks Mary Ann has taken on. They travel extensively. Mary Ann warns Nye that one among their own group is probably a traitor.

Some believe that near the end of World War II, Adolf Hitler went to a mental institution, met with a group of people who thought they were Hitler, and exchanged places with one of them, thus surviving the war. He escaped to Argentina, where he married and had a son who was branded with a swastika on his heel. This belief encourages those who want to resurrect the beliefs and ways of the Nazis. The Countess believes she has this boy with his swastika tattoo. The story is told to the Intelligence group by psychiatrist Dr Reichardt, but they know it is false. Hitler had no son. The British Intelligence group explains in several long expository chapters how drugs, promiscuity, and student unrest in the United States and Europe are caused by Nazi agitators. The agitators begin to bring about anarchy, attacking the American ambassador and the French Marshal. The goal is to re-build fascism. Meetings in Paris and London describe the movement of money and arms and their sources, and major players.

Nye's great-aunt, Lady Matilda, goes on her own trip, to visit her school mate, Countess Charlotte von Waldsausen, learning Charlotte's plans to be leader of the fascist world, which she then relates to her nephew. On her return, Matilda tells her friend Admiral Philip Blunt about the scientist Professor Shoreham, who invented something called Project B, or Benvo, which is a drug that makes people altruistic, but may cause a long-term change. Shoreham had a stroke, and he cannot communicate well. He had shelved Project B before his stroke. The Intelligence group meets at Shoreham's home, where he explains the limitations of his benevolent project. Kleek, traitor in the Intelligence group tries to kill Lord Altamount by poison and is blocked, so Miss Ellis the nurse to Shoreham shoots Lord Altamount, who dies of shock. Miss Ellis is recognized as Milly Jean Cortman, who had also killed her husband. The violent incident brings new energy to Shoreham, who resolves to restart work on his project. He will contact his colleague Gottlieb to restart Project Benvo and also arrange a memorial to Lord Altamount, the only politician he had ever trusted.

The final chapter is an epilogue, with Nye at Matilda's house preparing for his upcoming marriage to Mary Ann. The supposed son of Hitler has been brought to England for a more normal life and is about to become the organist at their church. Sybil, Nye's 5-year-old niece, will be the flower girl at the wedding. Nye forgets a best man, but asks Sybil to bring the panda, which he bought for her at the Frankfurt airport, as it has been "in it" from the beginning.

== Characters ==
- Sir Stafford Nye: English diplomat, age 45, with a sense of humour that marks him as unreliable to some in the diplomatic community.
- Mary Ann: Countess Renata Zerkowski, who is known as Daphne Theodofanous in various situations. She starts out a woman without a name when Nye first meets her in the Frankfurt airport. She is an active member of the group seeking to prove Countess Charlotte in the wrong, collecting information worldwide. Horsham says her mother was Greek and her father was German, and a grandfather was an Austrian subject (in the days of its Empire). The Intelligence group dubs her Mary Ann, reflecting her varied work for them.
- Panda: Nye buys a stuffed panda as a gift for his niece Sybil, when he is in the airport.
- Lady Matilda Cleckheaton: Nye's great-aunt who is well connected and has a mysterious past that left her with so many friends and contacts. She takes action to aid her nephew, with Lord Altamount and by her trip to Bavaria. She was schoolmate to the rich and powerful countess.
- Amy Leatheran: nurse and assistant to Lady Matilda.
- Gordon Chetwynd: Sir Stafford's acquaintance in the office, who tells Nye his story was in the newspaper.
- Henry Horsham: from the Security office, who pays heed to the incident of Nye at the airport, his passport taken. He is in the select group of Intelligence agents that meets at Robinson's home.
- Colonel Munro: works in the same office as Nye, and talks over Nye's incident at the airport, investigates it.
- Eric Pugh: Sir Stafford's acquaintance, school friend who is good at gathering information. They talk when he is in London, back from Malaya, and after his incident in the airport.
- Colonel Ephraim Pikeaway: heavy pipe smoker, retired, who is one of the select Intelligence group working to block an unwanted international movement. He is confident in Sir Stafford Nye. The character also appeared in two other novels: Cat Among the Pigeons (1959) and Postern of Fate (1973).
- Sir George Packham: the Minister who speaks with Pikeaway about Nye's incident at the Frankfurt airport. He worries about Nye.
- Sam Cortman: Ambassador of the United States to the United Kingdom, fictional. Days after the dinner, shot dead on the embassy steps in London, by his wife Mildred, as it was later learned.
- Mildred (Milly Jean) Cortman: wife of the American ambassador who hosts an embassy dinner.
- Mr Robinson: Financier, master of international money flows, both how to do them and how to learn who is doing them. He realizes that Shoreham did not burn his records of an important project, but put them in a safe somewhere. The character appeared in three other novels: Cat Among the Pigeons (1959), At Bertram's Hotel (1965), and Postern of Fate (1973).
- Lord (Edward) Altamount: retired from diplomatic service, serving as a consultant, and one of the select intelligence group. He dies of shock when Milly Jean Cortman wounds him with gunshot.
- Sir James Kleek: Lord Altamount's right-hand man, who recognizes patterns. He worked for Altamount for seven years, yet he is the traitor in the group, who tries to inject Altamount with strychnine but is stopped by Horsham in the meeting at Professor Shoreham's house. Further he tries to discredit Mary Ann as being Juanita, when Kleek knows the true Juanita.
- Countess Charlotte von Waldsausen: rich and powerful woman, very fat and with health problems that make walking difficult, who lives in Bavaria. She is also called Big Charlotte and she was a schoolmate of Lady Matilda. Matilda considers her to be like the character Brunhild in the opera Siegfried by Richard Wagner. She wants to change the world order, having been fond of the Nazi approach to life, an approach which was lost in World War II. The war ended 25 years before this story.
- Franz Joseph: young Siegfried under Countess Charlotte. Handsome, a skilled orator and musician. The one to lead the young in anarchy to break down the old en route to new, fascist ways. When the conspiracy is broken, Sir Stafford Nye brings him to England to play the organ at his Great-Aunt's local church.

Meeting in Paris

- Signor Vitelly: Prime Minister of Italy. He reports on upheavals in his country.
- Monsieur Coin: the Minister of the Interior for France. Meeting in Paris regarding violent social upheavals.
- Monsieur Grosjean: the President of France. Meeting in Paris regarding violent social upheavals in France and other European nations.
- The Marshal: charismatic military man of France, who insists he will face the armed groups of young people. He gets shot and wounded by the students.

Meetings in London

- Cedric Lazenby: Prime Minister of the United Kingdom, who wants to solve everything by a talk between him and the leader of another nation.
- Admiral Philip Blunt: an old friend of Lady Matilda. Considering the options.
- Professor Eckstein: a British scientist of high repute, nervous in this company of high government officials. He has a grim summary of lethal weapons, nothing helpful to the present situation.
- Herr Heinrich Spiess: the Chancellor of Germany, who meets with the Prime Minister and a few of the Intelligence group, so they hear the story of a German psychiatrist.
- Dr Reichardt: Psychiatrist at Karlsruhe during the war and after, he presents a story to the group that Hitler visited his hospital and let a patient who believed he was Hitler (a psychiatric disease) leave in his place. The patient left behind is soon removed by his family.
- Clifford Brent: one of three young men who visit Nye at his flat, showing they know he is one of them, the anarchists. Nye plays the Siegfried motif on his recorder, and one of them recognizes it.
- Jim Brewster: second of the three young men.
- Roderick Kettely: third of the three young men.

Meeting with Professor Shoreham in Scotland

- Professor John Gottlieb: he lives in Austin, Texas. Mary Ann visits him to ask about Project Benvo, which means Benevolent. He knows that Shoreham destroyed his records on the project a few weeks before he had a serious stroke.
- Squadron leader Andrews: he is the pilot who flies the party of the Intelligence group (Horsham, Altamount, Kleek, Munro, Robinson), to Professor Shoreham's home in Scotland and assists when things get violent.
- Professor Robert Shoreham: victim of a stroke, he has been listening to music, not working. Considered one of the brightest scientists, the Intelligence group seeks him out for information on one of his last projects. Like so many characters, he is good friends with Lady Matilda, who calls him Bobby.
- Lisa Neumann: Professor Shoreham's secretary. Austrian woman who worked with him first as a technical assistant, until his stroke.
- Juanita: name by which a dangerous spy, a dedicated killer, is known; she is found at Professor Shoreham's home. Shoreham needs a nurse as well as Miss Neuman, and the newest one is Miss Ellis. Her real name is Milly Jean Cortman, wife of the American ambassador to Britain. She shoots Lord Altamount when Kleek's effort to kill him by poison is blocked.
- Dr McCulloch: tends to Professor Shoreham and sees that Shoreham is ready to work again after the incident that afternoon.

== Literary significance and reception ==
Francis Iles (Anthony Berkeley Cox) in The Guardian (15 October 1970) said, "Of all the idiotic conventions attaching to the thriller the silliest is the idea that a car whizzing round a corner at high speed can be aimed at an intended victim who has, quite unseen, stepped off the pavement into the roadway at exactly the right moment. Agatha Christie uses this twice in Passenger to Frankfurt. For the rest the book is largely a discursus on a favourite old theme of Mrs Christie's, the present state of the world and its future outlook, on both of which she takes a somewhat dim view. In other words, for her eightieth book a rather more serious work than usual from this author."

Maurice Richardson in The Observer (13 September 1970) began, "Her eightieth book and [al]though not her best very far from her worst." He concluded: "At moments one wonders whether the old dear knows the difference between a hippie and a skinhead but she is still marvellously entertaining. I shall expect her to turn permissive for her eighty-firster."

Robert Barnard said of this spy novel that it was "The last of the thrillers, and one that slides from the unlikely to the inconceivable and finally lands up in incomprehensible muddle. Prizes should be offered to readers who can explain the ending. Concerns the youth uproar of the 'sixties, drugs, a new Aryan superman and so on, subjects of which Christie's grasp was, to say the least, uncertain (she seems to have the oddest idea of what the term 'Third World' means, for example). Collins insisted she subtitle the book 'An Extravaganza.' One can think of other descriptions."

== Analysis ==
Phyllis Lassner compares Passenger to Frankfurt with the Cold War novels of John le Carré, and with the novel The Salzburg Connection by Helen MacInnes. These novels reassess the victory of the Allies of World War II, and question the stability of post-war peace. The novels dramatise their era's anxieties about the re-emergence of Fascism during the Cold War. Lassner views both Passenger to Frankfurt and The Salzburg Connection as "speculative political fantasies".

Both Christie and MacInnes employed tropes typical for spy fiction: "masculine leadership", double agents, and thrilling chases and getaways. However, both female writers revised the typical gender roles of the spy fiction genre. The female characters of the two novels play an important role in investigating and intervening in international crises, while spy fiction writers typically reduce the female characters to sidekicks or romantic distractions for their protagonists.

Concerning Christie, Lassner notes that this was far from her first spy novel. Early in her career, Christie wrote a series of spy thrillers, such as The Secret Adversary (1922), The Man in the Brown Suit (1924), The Big Four (1927), and The Seven Dials Mystery (1929). However, Passenger to Frankfurt differs from other Christie novels, because it is not another example of detective fiction or crime fiction. It is a combination of thriller and dystopian fiction, exploring a hypothetical future for the entire world. The novel depicts a resurgence of Nazism, which depends on uniting the young people of the world under its creed. The new Nazi movement and its agents seduce the world's youth with promises of glory and heroism. The indoctrinated youth are manipulated into working to overthrow the governments of their respective nations and redeploying the national resources into supporting a new regime. The actual goal of the conspiracy is to establish a global oligarchy, controlled by a self-appointed master race.

Lassner also notes Christie's view on Nazism in general. The Fourth Reich of the novel is depicted as relying on a culture of drug users, sadism, lust for power, and hatred. The potential rise of this Reich to power is depicted as a downfall for the ideals of Individuality and democracy, along with the associated social and political order. Aunt Matilda serves as the proverbial "fount of wisdom" of the novel, observing that the Reich is not based on new ideas, but on an old, and recurring one: that everybody must follow "the young hero", the "golden superman", "the young Siegfried". Nye dismisses his aunt's warnings about Nazism as mere fancies. Matilda notes that people said the same thing in the interwar period about Adolf Hitler and about the Hitler Youth; but at that time, Nazism was planning its rise to power through planting fifth columns in different countries, people passionately believing in the Nazi creed. Matilda argues that the same methods could work again in the Cold War era, if the Nazi message is "offered cleverly enough".

Christie does not limit the dangers of the novel's era to the 1960s "brigades of revolutionary youth". Christie uses the novel to criticize the apathy of an older generation, while the youth of the era causes riots around the world. The recruitment drive for a new Children's Crusade, is (according to Christie) the result of the failure of the post-war generations (the parents and grandparents of the rioting youth) to create a better or more progressive political order. The older generations of the novel essentially cling to an "archaic political order", which offers no real progressive ideas. Lassner feels that it is not a coincidence that the novel opens with Stafford Nye dozing off at the Frankfurt Airport, reflecting Nye's casual indifference towards the political changes in the world surrounding him.

The late 1960s quest of Countess Renata and Nye to stop the "fascist crusade", causes them to travel from the United Kingdom to an 18th-century Schloss, which the text places in proximity to Berchtesgaden. Berchtesgaden is described as "Hitler's mountain lair". The Schloss of the novel serves as the headquarters of Gräfin Charlotte von Waldsausen, the place from where she devises strategies for world domination and trying to convert individuals into an obedient mass. The novel notes that Charlotte's original family name was "Krapp". Christie intended the name as a pun, connecting the villain of the novel with the Krupp family of industrialists, which was essential for Hitler's war machine. The Gräfin is depicted as explicitly supporting the Holocaust, when she fondly recalls deaths in gas chambers and torture cells. Her personal wealth, essential for financing her schemes, is described in the novel as deriving from the exploitation of the world's natural resources. She reportedly earned this wealth through exploitation and control over oil, copper, goldmines in South Africa, armaments in Sweden, uranium deposits, nuclear developments, and "vast stretches" of cobalt.

== Publication history ==
- 1970, Collins Crime Club (London), September 1970, Hardcover, 256 pp
- 1970, Dodd Mead and Company (New York), Hardcover, 272 pp
- 1972, Pocket Books (New York), Paperback
- 1973, Fontana Books (Imprint of HarperCollins), Paperback, 192 pp
- 1984, Ulverscroft Large-print Edition, Hardcover; ISBN 0-7089-1184-6

The book has been published continuously since 1970 and up to 2020, in English and other languages, per the list of books held at libraries in WorldCat.

The International Standard Book Number (ISBN) system was introduced in 1970 by the International Standards Organization (ISO), and this is the first Agatha Christie novel to have an ISBN on the first edition. Re-issues published in 1970 or later of her earlier novels have the ISBN issued and appears on the book, but not the first editions of those novels.
