= Death Comes as the End =

1944 historical mystery novel by Agatha Christie

Death Comes to the End
- Dust-jacket illustration of the US (true first) edition. See Publication history (below) for UK first edition jacket image.
- Author: Agatha Christie
- Language: English
- Genre: Historical mystery
- Publisher: Dodd, Mead and Company
- Publication date: October 1944
- Media type: Print (hardcover and paperback)
- Pages: 223 (first edition, hardcover
- Preceded by: Absent in the Spring
- Followed by: Sparkling Cyanide

Death Comes as the End is a historical mystery novel by Agatha Christie, first published in the US by Dodd, Mead and Company in October 1944 and in the UK by the Collins Crime Club in March of the following year. The US Edition retailed at $2.00 and the UK edition at seven shillings and sixpence (7/6).

It is the only one of Christie's novels not to be set in the 20th century, and – unusually for her – also features no European characters. Instead, the novel is set in Thebes in the 11th dynasty, a setting for which Christie gained an appreciation whilst working with her archaeologist husband, Sir Max Mallowan, in the Middle East. The novel is notable for its very high number of deaths and is comparable to And Then There Were None from this standpoint. It is also the first full-length novel combining historical fiction and the whodunit/detective story, a genre which would later come to be called the historical whodunit.

The suggestion to base the story in ancient Egypt came from noted Egyptologist and family friend Stephen Glanville. He also assisted Christie with details of daily household life in Egypt 4000 years ago. In addition he made forceful suggestions to Christie to change the ending of the book. This she did but regretted the fact afterward, feeling that her (unpublished) ending was better. The novel is based on real letters translated by Egyptologist Battiscombe Gunn, from the Egyptian Middle Kingdom period, written by a man called Heqanakhte to his family, complaining about their behaviour and treatment of his concubine.

It is one of only four Christie novels to have not received an adaptation of any kind, the others being Destination Unknown, Passenger to Frankfurt and Postern of Fate.

Christie uses a theme for her chapter titles, as she did for many of her novels, in this case the Egyptian agricultural calendar.

== Plot introduction ==
Egyptian mortuary priest Imhotep returns from a visit to the north, bringing home a new concubine, Nofret, who begins to sow discontent amongst his family. Once the deaths begin, fears of a supernatural curse spread through the household, but the true causes may be more tangible.

== Plot summary ==
Recently-widowed Renisenb, the only daughter of the mortuary priest Imhotep, returns to her father's estate after eight years' absence. Besides her father and a considerable staff of servants, the other inmates of the house include her wise grandmother Esa, her quiet elder brother Yahmose and his domineering wife Satipy, her brash second brother Sobek and his slow-witted wife Kait, and her spoiled younger brother Ipy. Though disgusted by the malicious gossip of her late mother's old relation Henet, who disguises her activities by professing constant love and devotion to the family, Renisenb is glad to be home; however, Imhotep's scribe Hori warns Renisenb that there is rottenness somewhere beneath the surface.

Imhotep returns from visiting his northern estate, bringing with him a second scribe Kameni, who begins to fall in love with Renisenb. Imhotep also brings home a new young concubine, Nofret. Esa warns Imhotep that he is making a mistake; soon afterwards, Nofret begins deliberately antagonizing the family and turning Imhotep against them. Renisenb tries to befriend Nofret, but is coldly rebuffed. When Nofret reports to Imhotep that Satipy and Kait have been unkind to her, Imhotep threatens to disown all his sons. Nofret is later found dead, having apparently fallen from a narrow cliff path leading to the tombs.

Satipy begins to act uncharacteristically nervous and submissive. Some time after Nofret's funeral, Renisenb and Hori see Satipy and Yahmose walking on the path to the tombs. Satipy looks back, apparently sees something beyond Yahmose, backs away in terror, and falls from the cliff. Renisenb rushes to Satipy, and hears her utter the word "Nofret" before she dies. The family therefore assumes that Satipy pushed Nofret off the cliff, and that Nofret's ghost has exacted revenge. Later, Yahmose and Sobek are poisoned, the latter fatally. A servant boy claims to have seen a woman, dressed in Nofret's clothes, doing something to the men's wine; the same boy is found dead of a poppy juice overdose the next morning.

Esa confers with Hori and Renisenb, and explains she believes someone in the house instructed the servant boy to lie about seeing Nofret's ghost, then silenced him. Ipy, who has begun to boast that he will take Yahmose and Sobek's place, seems a likely suspect, but he is later found drowned in the lake. Esa gathers the family and accuses Henet of concealing dangerous knowledge; afterwards, in private, Esa and Hori discover they both suspect the same person, but have no proof.

Kameni offers to marry Renisenb and take her away for her safety; her father persuades her to agree, though her affections are torn between Kameni and Hori. Renisenb later learns that Kameni and Nofret had known each other in the North, and that Nofret's bitterness stemmed from her unrequited love for Kameni. The same evening, Renisenb finally gets Henet to admit she hates, rather than loves, the family. Some time later, Esa's unguent is poisoned, and she dies.

Renisenb receives a message to meet Hori at the tombs; after she leaves, Henet is smothered to death. At the cliffs, Renisenb is attacked by Yahmose, before Hori shoots him dead with an arrow. Hori explains that Yahmose, constantly browbeaten by Satipy, his brothers, and his father, had long harboured a festering hatred, and finally snapped at the threat of being disinherited. He had thrown Nofret from the cliff, with Satipy as a witness; she became terrified of her husband, eventually realized he intended to kill her as well, and backed off the cliff while trying to escape him (it was he, not anything beyond him, that she looked at in horror). Yahmose then poisoned Sobek and mildly poisoned himself, exaggerating the symptoms, to divert suspicion from himself. Having acquired a taste for violence, he had poisoned the servant boy, drowned Ipy, and intended to kill Renisenb as well so he could be the sole heir of Imhotep's wealth. He also removed Esa and Henet - Henet having conspired with him to kill Renisenb - to safeguard himself.

Now that the threat is gone, Renisenb realizes that it is Hori, not Kameni, that she truly loves. The two embrace as the sun sets.

== Characters in Death Comes as the End ==
- Imhotep, a mortuary priest
- Nofret, Imhotep's concubine from the north
- Esa, Imhotep's mother
- Yahmose, Imhotep's eldest son
- Satipy, Yahmose's wife
- Ipy, Imhotep's youngest son
- Renisenb, Imhotep's daughter
- Sobek, Imhotep's second son
- Kait, Sobek's wife
- Henet, obsequious family retainer, poor relation of Ashayet, Imhotep's deceased wife
- Hori, the family's scribe
- Kameni, a scribe from the North
- Teti, Renisenb's daughter
- Khay, Renisenb's late husband

== Literary significance and reception ==
Maurice Willson Disher said in The Times Literary Supplement of 28 April 1945 that, "When a specialist acquires unerring skill there is a temptation to find tasks that are exceptionally difficult. The scenes of Death Comes as the End are laid out in Ancient Egypt. They are painted delicately. The household of the priest, who is depicted not as a sacred personage, but as a humdrum landowner, makes an instant appeal because its members are human. But while the author's skill can cause a stir over the death of an old woman some thousands of years ago, that length of time lessens curiosity concerning why or how she (and others) died."

Maurice Richardson, a self-proclaimed admirer of Christie, wrote in the 8 April 1945 issue of The Observer, "One of the best weeks of the war for crime fiction. First, of course, the new Agatha Christie; Death Comes as the End. And it really is startlingly new, with its ancient Egyptian setting in the country household of a mortuary priest who overstrains his already tense family by bringing home an ultra-tough live in concubine from Memphis. Result: a series of murders. With her special archaeological equipment, Mrs Christie makes you feel just as much at home on the Nile in 1945 B.C. as if she were bombarding you with false clues in a chintz-covered drawing room in Leamington Spa. But she has not merely changed scenes; her reconstruction is vivid and she works really hard at her characters. My already insensate admiration for her leaps even higher."

In 1990 the novel was included in Crime Writers' Associations' The Top 100 Crime Novels of All Time list.

Robert Barnard: "Hercule Poirot's Christmas, transported to Egypt, ca 2000 B.C. Done with tact, yet the result is somehow skeletal – one realises how much the average Christie depends on trappings: clothes, furniture, the paraphernalia of bourgeois living. The culprit in this one is revealed less by detection than by a process of elimination."

== Publication history ==
Dustjacket illustration of the UK first edition (book was first published in the US)

- 1944, US, Dodd & Mead, October 1944, hardcover (first US edition), 223 pp
- 1945, UK, The Crime Club Collins, March 1945, hardcover (first UK edition), 160 pp
- 1947, Pocket Books (New York), paperback (Pocket number 465), 179 pp
- 1953, Penguin Books, paperback (Penguin number 926), 188 pp
- 1960, Fontana Books (imprint of HarperCollins), paperback, 191 pp
- 1957, Pan Books, paperback, 221 pp
- 1975, Ulverscroft large-print edition, hardcover, 334 pp

== Planned adaptation ==
A BBC adaptation of the novel was announced in August 2016, as part of a sequence of Christie productions. Gwyneth Hughes was announced as the adaptation's writer in December 2018, with broadcast planned for 2019. However, no further news on the adaptation was subsequently revealed.
