= Postern of Fate =

1973 mystery novel by Agatha Christie

- Dust-jacket illustration of the first UK edition
- Author: Agatha Christie
- Cover artist: Margaret Murray
- Language: English
- Genre: Crime novel
- Publisher: Collins Crime Club
- Publication date: October 1973
- Publication place: United Kingdom
- Media type: Print (hardback & paperback)
- Pages: 256 pp (first edition, hardcover)
- ISBN: 0-00-231190-9
- OCLC: 2736294
- Dewey Decimal: 823/.9/12
- LC Class: PZ3.C4637 Pq3 PR6005.H66
- Preceded by: Elephants Can Remember
- Followed by: Poems

Postern of Fate is a mystery novel by Agatha Christie, first published in the UK by the Collins Crime Club in October 1973 and in the US by Dodd, Mead and Company later in the same year. The UK edition retailed at £2.00 and the US edition at $6.95.

The book features her detectives Tommy and Tuppence Beresford and is the detectives' last appearance. It is the last novel Christie wrote, but not the last to be published as it was followed by two unpublished novels written in the 1940s.

The Beresfords are depicted as a retired couple, but they begin to investigate a cold case dating to the First World War. The case involves the poisoning of a female spy.

This is one of only four Christie novels not to have received an adaptation of any kind—the others being Death Comes as the End, Destination Unknown and Passenger to Frankfurt.

== Explanation of the title ==
The title comes from the poem "Gates of Damascus" by James Elroy Flecker. The poem is also referenced in the short story "The Gate of Baghdad" in the 1934 collection Parker Pyne Investigates.

== Plot summary ==
Tommy and Tuppence have decided to retire and purchased a new residence, the Laurels. The house is located in Hollowquay, a resort town. The couple has inherited the library of the Laurels' previous owners, and Tuppence decides to sort through its collection of children's books. She examines a copy of The Black Arrow (1888), for she recalls having read this novel in her youth. Inside the book, Tuppence finds a hidden message: "Mary Jordan did not die naturally. It was one of us. I think I know which one."

Tuppence searches for the grave of Mary Jordan, but is unable to locate it. Tommy later finds the grave of Alexander Parkinson, who was the book's original owner and the message's writer. Alexander had died at the age of 14. Investigating the past of the Parkinson household, Tuppence finds out that Mary Jordan was employed as a governess for the Parkinsons. Mary reportedly died accidentally, poisoned by eating lethal foxglove leaves. The leaves had been mixed into a salad that she ate. The death occurred 60 years before the present.

Tommy and Tuppence gather information about Mary from ageing villagers and learn that she was involved in "secret government affairs", involving the plans for the development of a new submarine. Tommy contacts his former associates in British intelligence, who confirm this information. The Beresfords learn that Mary was herself a British secret agent.

The Beresfords are initially content to investigate this cold case, but their gardener Isaac Bodlicott is murdered on their doorstep. The couple are apparently close to uncovering a "long-buried secret", and there are mysterious enemies willing to stop them.

== Literary significance and reception ==
Maurice Richardson in The Observer of 11 November 1973 was positive in his review: "Now in their seventies, the Beresfords, that amateur detective couple of hers whom some of us found too sprightly for comfort, have acquired a Proustian complexity. A code message in an Edwardian children's book puts them on to the murder of a governess involved in a pre-1914 German spy case. Past and present go on interlocking impressively. Despite political naivety; this is a genuine tour de force with a star part for Hannibal, the Manchester Terrier."

Robert Barnard wrote negatively that Postern of Fate was "The last book Christie wrote. Best (and easily) forgotten."

According to The Cambridge Guide to Women's Writing in English, this novel is one of the "execrable last novels" in which Christie purportedly "loses her grip altogether".

A 2009 study which compared the texts of a number of Christie novels indicated that her later works, including Postern of Fate, showed a 15 to 30% decrease in vocabulary, and posited that this was indicative of Alzheimer's disease.

== Publication history ==
- 1973, Collins Crime Club (London), October 1973, Hardcover, 254 pp
- 1973, Dodd Mead and Company (New York), Hardcover, 310 pp
- 1974 Bantam Books, Paperback, 276 pp
- 1974 GK Hall & Co. Large-print Edition, Hardcover, 471 pp; ISBN 0-8161-6197-6
- 1976, Fontana Books (Imprint of HarperCollins), Paperback, 221 pp
- 1992, Ulverscroft large-print Edition, Hardcover; ISBN 0-7089-2708-4

== References to other works ==
The book has many references to the earlier novels and short stories in which Tommy and Tuppence appeared. We learn, rather inconsistently, that Tommy and Tuppence's twin daughter Deborah is herself now a mother of twins, even though her three children are later identified as Andrew aged 15, Janet aged 11 and Rosalie aged 7. We are also informed that Tommy and Tuppence's adopted daughter Betty lives in Kenya and that Amy (previously referred to as Milly in By the Pricking of My Thumbs), Albert's wife, has been dead for "some years". Mr Robinson, the "yellow, big man" from Passenger to Frankfurt appears here, as do Colonel Pikeaway and Horsham, the latter posing undercover as a gardener.

== Analysis ==
In this novel, Tommy and Tuppence are depicted as a retired couple. Their "devoted henchman" Albert has moved in with them. The couple also have a pet dog as a companion. The dog is called Hannibal, a Manchester Terrier. Hannibal is very protective of his owners, an element which later serves as a plot point.

Parts of the novel are devoted to the Beresfords dealing with the plumbers and electricians who are repairing their house. There are complaints about how these people habitually mistreat their clients, but these characters are largely irrelevant to the mystery plot.

Tuppence is the one initially conducting the investigation, while Tommy seems uninterested. When questioning the locals, Tuppence feigns a general interest in their town's history. Most of them insist that the events they describe happened before their time, but still offer information. Most of the available narratives are contradictory to each other.

Tuppence learns that Mary Jordan was somehow involved in "trouble" in the town during World War I. Some of the narratives report that Mary was a German nursemaid, a "frowline" (from the German Fräulein). She regularly visited London on her days off, and she was rumoured to be a spy. Her death was regarded as accidental, as someone "erroneously" picked foxglove leaves and mixed them with the spinach growing nearby.

The novel has a scene involving Colonel Atkinson, Tommy's contact from the secret service. He feels that the Beresfords moving to Hollowquay is not a coincidence, and suspects that they are there on an official mission. He even indirectly asks Tommy whether he has been sent there "to have a look around", without asking who has sent Tommy in the first place. Other associates of the Beresfords from the secret service drop hints about the past of both Mary Jordan and the Beresfords themselves. Yet these hints do not translate into coherent information.

The Beresfords' gardener is murdered, by being "coshed on the head". His death alerts Tuppence that something is wrong in Hollowquay. She comments that there must be "Something left over from the past". Tommy curiously asks her not to get worked up for this case, hardly a proper reaction to a murder. Shortly after, Tuppence is "grazed by a bullet" within her own back garden.

This is the last novel featuring the Beresfords, and as usual they are affiliated with an intelligence agency. The characters have aged since their previous appearances, with Tommy and Tuppence both over the age of 70. Their children are full adults, and we briefly learn what has become of them. Their biological daughter Deborah has married, has settled in Scotland, and has three children of her own. Their adoptive daughter Betty has become an anthropologist, and is conducting research in Africa.

As with previous Beresford novels, the main theme is the enemy within. An ominous message about a 60-year-old murder sets them to investigating threats to British security. At the end of the novel, the couple are congratulated by appreciative government officials.

Postern is "less tightly plotted" than the previous Beresford novels. The first chapters of the novel are somewhat confusing and directionless. The first hint about the novel's main plot is introduced in chapter 12.

Due to injury and age, Christie switched from typing her later novels, including Postern, to dictating them and leaving transcription to others, which is considered to be part of the reasons for decline in quality.

In the book, Christie makes references to Ashfield, Torquay, the house she grew up in.

== Bibliography ==
- Bunson, Matthew (2000), "Postern of Fate", The Complete Christie: An Agatha Christie Encyclopedia, Simon and Schuster, ISBN 978-0671028312
- Fitzgibbon, Russell H. (1980), "Christie Bureau of Detectives", The Agatha Christie Companion, Bowling Green State University Popular Press, ISBN 978-0879721381
- Riley, Dick; McAllister, Pam; Cassiday, Bruce (2001), "Postern of Fate (1974)", The Bedside, Bathtub & Armchair Companion to Agatha Christie, Continuum International Publishing Group, ISBN 978-0826413758
