= The Man in the Brown Suit (1989 film) =

1989 American mystery film

- Directed by: Alan Grint
- Screenplay by: Carla Jean Wagner
- Starring: Stephanie Zimbalist; Rue McClanahan; Tony Randall; Edward Woodward; Ken Howard
- Cinematography: Ken Westbury
- Music by: Arthur B. Rubinstein
- Production companies: Alan Shayne Productions; Warner Bros Television
- Release date: 4 January 1989
- Running time: 100 minutes
- Country: United States
- Language: English

The Man in the Brown Suit is a television movie adaptation of an Agatha Christie mystery novel of the same name about an American woman getting involved in a diamond theft in South Africa.

== Cast ==
- Stephanie Zimbalist as Anne Beddingfeld
- Rue McClanahan as Suzy Blair
- Tony Randall as Rev. Edward Chichester
- Edward Woodward as Sir Eustace Pedler
- Ken Howard as Gordon Race
- Nickolas Grace as Guy Underhill
- Simon Dutton as Harry Lucas
- Maria Casal as Anita
- Federicio Luciano as Leo Carton
- Rose McVeigh as Valerie
- Jorge Bosso as the Businessman
- Jose Canalejas as Arab #1
- Robert Case as the Ship's captain
- Tibi Costa as Arab #2
- James Duggan as steward
