= Destination Unknown (novel) =

1954 mystery novel by Agatha Christie

- Dust-jacket illustration of the first UK edition
- Author: Agatha Christie
- Language: English
- Genre: Spy novel
- Publisher: Collins Crime Club
- Publication date: 1 November 1954
- Publication place: United Kingdom
- Media type: Print (hardback & paperback)
- Pages: 192 first edition, hardback
- Preceded by: A Pocket Full of Rye
- Followed by: Hickory Dickory Dock

Destination Unknown is a work of spy fiction by Agatha Christie and first published in the UK by the Collins Crime Club on 1 November 1954 and in US by Dodd, Mead and Company in 1955 under the title of So Many Steps to Death. The UK edition retailed at ten shillings and sixpence (10/6) and the US edition at $2.75.

The novel opens in Casablanca, Morocco, where Hilary Craven is staying after a failed marriage. She plans to commit suicide, but is instead recruited by the British secret service for a mission. She is asked to impersonate the wife of a nuclear scientist who has recently disappeared. Hilary is soon transported to meet her new "husband".

Reviews at the time of publication in 1954–1955 found the novel timely, and clearly more fun for Mrs Christie to write than her usual mystery novels. One reviewer was clear in saying that mystery novels were her strong suit and this type of novel was not, yet it was worth reading. A later review, by Robert Barnard, felt the novel started well, but digressed as it found its way to the resolution, and "topples into hokum". He mentioned the highly valued scientists who worked at Los Alamos during World War II on the atomic bomb and disappeared when peace came as the premise for the novel; Bruno Pontecorvo, who defected to the Soviet Union in 1950, and Klaus Fuchs, theoretical physicist who sent secret information to the Soviet Union and was imprisoned about that same time for that crime.

It is one of only four Christie novels not to have received an adaptation of any kind, the others being Death Comes as the End, Passenger to Frankfurt, and Postern of Fate.

== Plot summary ==
Hilary Craven, a deserted wife and bereaved mother, is planning suicide in a Moroccan hotel in Casablanca, when she is asked by British secret agent Jessop to undertake a dangerous mission as an alternative to taking an overdose of sleeping pills. The task, which she accepts, is to impersonate a dying woman to help find the woman's husband, Thomas Betterton, a nuclear scientist who has disappeared and may have defected to the Soviet Union. Soon she finds herself in a group of travellers being transported to the unknown destination of the title.

The destination turns out to be a secret scientific research facility disguised as a modern leper colony and leprosy research center at a remote location in the Atlas Mountains. The fabulously wealthy Mr Aristides has built the facility and lured the world's best young scientists to it so that he can later sell their services back to the world's governments and corporations for a huge profit, after having removed the scientists' resistance through lobotomies. The scientists are not allowed to leave the facility, and they are locked in secret areas deep inside the mountain whenever government officials and other outsiders visit.

Hilary Craven successfully passes herself as Betterton's wife Olive, because he is miserable and wants desperately to escape. She falls in love with Andrew Peters, a handsome young American who was in the group with her on their journey to the facility. Through clues she has left along the way, Jessop eventually locates and rescues her and the others held there, with help from Peters, who turns out also to be a secret agent and the cousin of Betterton's first wife Elsa, whom Betterton had murdered. Betterton and Aristides are arrested, Hilary no longer wants to die, and she and Peters are free to begin their life together.

== Characters ==
- Mr Jessop, a British security agent
- Colonel Wharton, a nervous and abrupt but dedicated British secret service agent who works alongside Jessop
- Thomas Betterton, a young scientist who has recently disappeared
- Olive Betterton, his second wife who wishes to join him
- Boris Glydr, the Polish cousin of Thomas Betterton's deceased first wife, Elsa
- Hilary Craven, a woman with looks similar to Olive, recently lost her only child and her husband left her
- Mrs Calvin Baker, a seemingly typical American tourist, who is actually a major player in the events that unfold, and who harbors great resentment and hatred for her native country
- Janet Hetherington, a dour English traveller, really a British agent
- Henri Laurier, a gallant Frenchman
- Mr Aristides, a Greek financier, and one of the world's wealthiest men with his hands in many different pots worldwide
- Andrew Peters, a young research chemist
- Torquil Ericsson, a Norwegian idealist
- Dr Louis Barron, a Frenchman dedicated to bacteriological research
- Helga Needheim, an arrogant German scientist
- Paul Van Heidem, a social manager at the facility
- Dr Nielson, the deputy director, in charge of administration
- The Director, a charismatic speaker employed by Aristides
- Dr Rubec, a psychologist employed by Aristides working at a medical research establishment in the Atlas Mountains
- Dr Schwartz, a medical examiner, at the medical research establishment, in the Atlas Mountains
- Simon and Bianca Murchison, a couple present at the research establishment
- M. LeBlanc, a French investigator who works with Jessop

== Major themes ==
This book explores the 1950s subject of defection to the Soviets, but it also demonstrates how the break-up of Christie's first marriage in the 1920s remained with her. Like her 1934 Mary Westmacott novel Unfinished Portrait, it starts with a youngish woman who has married, had a daughter and whose husband has replaced her with someone else.

In both books, a young man displays remarkable perceptiveness in spotting her intention to end her life and defies convention to save her, not only in tackling a stranger on intimate matters but in spending time in the woman's hotel bedroom to talk her out of suicide. In this story he talks her into espionage instead.

== Literary significance and reception ==
Philip John Stead writing in The Times Literary Supplement in its review of 19 November 1954, was enthusiastic about the novel in posing the question, "Where do scientists go when they vanish from the ken of the Security Services? A solution to this fascinating problem is propounded in Destination Unknown. While it must be admitted that the secret, when disclosed, smacks rather of The Thousand and One Nights than of modern international rivalry for scientific talents, it may surely be excused on the ground that it provides Mrs Christie with a story-tellers holiday from the rigours of detective fiction. Readers may regret the absence of the tonic logicalities of crime's unravelling – though "clues" are not altogether missing – for the secret service story belongs largely to Adventure, but in their place is the author's obvious pleasure in the wider horizons of the more romantic genre." The review concluded, "However much the purist yearns for Poirot or Miss Marple, he can hardly deplore Mrs Christie's bright, busy excursion into this topical and extravagant sphere."

Maurice Richardson of The Observer of 31 October 1954, said, "The thriller is not Agatha Christie's forte; it makes her go all breathless and naïve." He concluded, "Needs to be read indulgently in a very comfortable railway carriage. She probably had a delicious busman's holiday writing it."

Robert Barnard wrote, "Slightly above-average thriller, with excellent beginning (heroine, whose husband has left her for another woman, and whose small daughter had died, contemplates suicide in strange hotel). Thereafter topples over into hokum, with a notably unexciting climax. Mainly concerns disappearing scientists – it is written in the wake of the Fuchs/Pontecorvo affairs. Mentions the un-American Activities Committee, without obvious disapproval." Barnard refers to Bruno Pontecorvo, a pioneering nuclear scientist who worked with the Allies in World War II then defected to the Soviet Union in 1950 and Klaus Fuchs, theoretical physicist who was also in Los Alamos during World War II, but sent secret knowledge to the Soviet Union and went to prison for that in 1950.

== Publication history ==
- 1954, Collins Crime Club (London), 1 November 1954, Hardback, 192 pp
- 1955, Dodd Mead and Company (New York), 1955, Hardback, 212 pp
- 1956, Pocket Books (New York), Paperback, 183 pp
- 1958, Fontana Books (Imprint of HarperCollins), Paperback, 191 pp
- 1969, Ulverscroft Large-print Edition, Hardcover, 203 pp
- 1977, Greenway edition of collected works (William Collins), Hardcover, 196 pp ISBN 0-00-231089-9
- 1978, Greenway edition of collected works (Dodd Mead), Hardcover, 196 pp
- May 1983, Pocket Books, paperback, 237 pp, ISBN 0671473085

In the UK the novel was first serialised in the weekly magazine John Bull in five abridged instalments from 25 September (Volume 96, Number 2517) to 23 October 1954 (Volume 96, Number 2521) with illustrations by William Little.

The novel was first serialised in the US in the Chicago Tribune in fifty-one parts from Tuesday, 12 April to Thursday 9 June 1955 under the title of Destination X.
