= The Road of Dreams =

1925 book of poetry by Agatha Christie

- Dust-jacket of the first and only UK edition
- Author: Agatha Christie
- Cover artist: Not known
- Language: English
- Genre: Poetry
- Publisher: Geoffrey Bles
- Publication date: January 1925
- Publication place: United Kingdom
- Media type: Print (hardcover)
- Pages: 112 pp (first edition, hardcover)
- Preceded by: The Man in the Brown Suit
- Followed by: The Secret of Chimneys

The Road of Dreams is a book of poetry by crime writer Agatha Christie. It was published at her own expense by Geoffrey Bles in January 1925 priced at five shillings (5/-). Only one edition of the 112-page volume was ever published and this was undated.

Christie wrote poetry for most of her life; her first traceable published works are three poems from 1919: World Hymn in The Poetry Review issue for March/April, Dark Sheila in Poetry Today issue for May/June and A Passing in the same journal for November/December. All three poems are reprinted in The Road of Dreams (with the first under the slightly amended title of World Hymn, 1914).

The book is divided into four sections:

- A Masque from Italy
- Ballads
- Dreams and Fantasies
- Other Poems

The final section includes a poem titled In a Dispensary which mentions many of the poisons that Christie would use in her long fictional career.

== Literary response ==
The Times Literary Supplement in its issue of 26 February 1925 praised A Masque from Italy and other selected poems whilst stating that "her talent, however, is too delicate to turn a ballad convincingly" and World Hymn, 1914 was a "subject too large for her hand to grasp". It did conclude, however, by stating that in poems such as Beatrice Passes (from Dreams and Fantasies) her "real poetic gift is best displayed".

The Scotsman of 23 March 1925 said,

Miss Agatha Christie, in her book of poems, The Road of Dreams, reveals a pleasing lyrical sense. The movement of her verse is light and graceful, and its substance, though not of the 'thought compact,' is not empty. Such lines, however – and there are a few – as:–

"The South Wind comes a-whispering, a-whispering from the sea,"

are banal. Flow in verse is not everything. A stronger note is struck in some of the ballads, for instance, The Ballad of the Flint. Here Miss Christie has a story to tell, and along 'the road of reality' she swings quite vigorously. In the first collection of songs, grouped together as A Masque from Italy – the players are the old and over-new Harlequin and company – Miss Christie is perhaps happiest. The poem is quite a charming bubble.

== Forgotten creations ==
Christie does not mention the book in her autobiography. Her official biography recounts that Eden Phillpotts, a family friend, wrote to her and told her she "had great lyric gifts". He also warned her that it would not sell well, and was proven right when copies remained unbound and unsold well into the 1960s.

The contents of this book were reprinted in the 1973 collection Poems as "Volume 1", although there are several differences between the two editions (See Poems for details).

== Publication history ==
- 1925, Geoffrey Bles, Hardcover, January 1925, 112 pp, OCLC 12657447
