= The Man in the Brown Suit =

1924 mystery novel by Agatha Christie

- Dust-jacket illustration of the first edition
- Author: Agatha Christie
- Cover artist: Not known
- Language: English
- Genre: Crime
- Publisher: Bodley Head
- Publication date: 22 August 1924
- Publication place: United Kingdom
- Media type: Print (hardback & paperback)
- Pages: 312 (first edition, hardcover)
- Followed by: The Road of Dreams
- Text: The Man in the Brown Suit online

The Man in the Brown Suit is a mystery novel by British writer Agatha Christie, first published in the UK by The Bodley Head on 22 August 1924 and in the US by Dodd, Mead and Company later in the same year. The character Colonel Race is introduced in this novel.

Anne Beddingfeld is on her own and ready for adventures when one comes her way. She sees a man die in a tube station and picks up a piece of paper dropped nearby. The message on the paper leads her to South Africa as she fits more pieces of the puzzle together about the death she witnessed. There is a murder in England the next day, and the murderer attempts to kill her on the ship en route to Cape Town.

The setting for the early chapters is London. Later chapters are set in Cape Town, Bulawayo, and on a fictional island in the Zambezi. The plot involves an agent provocateur who wants to retire, and has eliminated his former agents.

Reviews were mixed at publication, as some hoped for another book featuring Hercule Poirot, while others liked the writing style and were sure that readers would want to read to the end to learn who was the murderer. A later reviewer liked the start of the novel, but felt that the end was weaker. The reviewer did not like it when the story became like a thriller novel.

== Plot summary ==
Nadina, a dancer in Paris, and Count Sergius Paulovitch, both in service of "the Colonel", an international agent provocateur, discuss Nadina's plan to blackmail "the Colonel" with stolen diamonds that could reveal his guilt in a prior crime.

Anne Beddingfeld witnesses an accident at Hyde Park Corner tube station when a man is surprised and falls accidentally onto the live track. Anne picks up a note dropped by the doctor who examined the dead man, which read "17·122 Kilmorden Castle" and a house agent's order to view Mill House in Marlow where a dead woman has been found the next day. A young man in a brown suit was identified as a suspect, having entered the house soon after the dead woman.

Anne realizes the examination of the dead man was suspicious and visits the Mill House where she finds a canister of undeveloped film. Anne learns that 'Kilmorden Castle' is a sailing ship and books passage on it. On board the ship, Anne meets Suzanne Blair, Colonel Race, Reverend Edward Chichester, and Sir Eustace Pedler and his secretaries, Guy Pagett and Harry Rayburn.

Colonel Race recounts the story of the theft of diamonds some years before, attributed to the son of a South African gold magnate, John Eardsley, and his friend Harry Lucas. The friends fought in the Great War where John was killed and his father's huge fortune passed to his next of kin, Race himself. Lucas was posted as "missing in action".

Anne and Suzanne examine the piece of paper Anne obtained in the Underground station and realizes that it could refer to cabin 71, Suzanne's cabin, originally booked by a woman who did not appear. Anne connects finding the film roll in Mill House with a film canister containing uncut diamonds that was dropped into Suzanne's cabin in the early hours of the 22nd. They speculate that Harry Rayburn is the Man in the Brown Suit.

In Cape Town, Anne is lured to a house at Muizenberg, where she is imprisoned but manages to escape the next morning and returns to Cape Town to find that Harry is wanted as the Man in the Brown Suit and has gone missing. Pedler offers Anne the role of his secretary on his train trip to Rhodesia which she accepts at the last second, and is reunited on the train with Race, Suzanne and Pedler, who has a new secretary named Miss Pettigrew.

In Bulawayo, Anne receives a note from Harry which lures her out to a ravine near their hotel. She is chased and falls into the ravine. Almost a month later, Anne awakens in a hut on an island in the Zambezi with Harry Rayburn, who rescued her. Anne and Harry fall in love and Harry tells her his side of the story revealing that he and John were both in love with Anita / Nadina who cheated them. Carton, her husband fell to the track on the shock of seeing Harry again. Harry admits that he is the man in the brown suit but denied that he killed Anita. Harry's island is attacked, but the two escape and set Harry's house on fire, and Anne reunites with Suzanne. They exchange codes to be used in future communications so that neither can be duped again. She receives a telegram signed Harry telling her to meet him, but not using their code.

Anne instead meets Chichester, alias Miss Pettigrew. Anne requests to meet with Chichester's boss who she had correctly deduced is Sir Eustace Peddler. Pedler forces Anne to write a note to Harry to lure him to his office. Harry turns up and Pedler is exultant until Anne pulls out a pistol and they capture Pedler. Race turns up with reinforcements but Sir Eustace escapes overnight. Race tells her that Harry is John Eardsley, not Harry Lucas.

Anne and Harry plan to return to England to marry. In the night, Harry calls Anne outside, admits that receiving a huge fortune worries him, and asks Anne to stay with him in Rhodesia. Anne joins Harry to live on the island in the Zambezi and have a son.

== Characters ==
- Anne Beddingfeld: orphaned daughter of Professor Beddingfeld, famous archaeologist.
- Anita Grünberg: alias Nadina, beautiful woman, murdered in The Mill House.
- John Harold Eardsley: son of Sir Laurence Eardsley, the South African mining magnate who died a month before Anne is aboard the ship, alias Harry Lucas, alias Harry Rayburn.
- Harry Lucas: friend of John Eardsley, killed in the Great War.
- Colonel Race: a distant cousin of Sir Laurence Eardsley who works for the British government as a spy or a detective. He has a reputation as lion hunter in Africa and as a wealthy man.
- Suzanne, the Hon. Mrs Clarence Blair: a society lady who befriends Anne Beddingfeld.
- Sir Eustace Pedler: a wealthy Member of Parliament and a businessman.
- Guy Pagett: Sir Eustace Pedler's secretary.
- Arthur Minks: alias the Reverend Edward Chichester, alias the mysterious Hostess on the "Kilmorden", alias Miss Pettigrew, alias Count Sergius Paulovitch, and an agent of "The Colonel".
- Mr Flemming: solicitor, and his wife: Anne's hosts after her father's death.
- L B Carton: Anita Grünberg's husband, a diamond sorter for De Beers in South Africa. He died at Hyde Park Tube Station.
- Inspector Meadows: Scotland Yard detective who dismisses Anne's evidence about the murder in The Mill House as unimportant.
- Lord Nasby: owner of the Daily Budget and Anne's employer.
- The red-bearded Dutchman: an agent of "The Colonel".
- Mrs Caroline James: wife of the gardener at The Mill House, who gives the keys to potential renters.
- The Colonel: criminal mastermind and murderer whose identity is concealed for most of the story.

== Literary significance and reception ==
The Times Literary Supplement reviewed the novel in its issue of 25 September 1924. The review appreciated the "thriller-cum-adventure" style of the book and concluded, "The author sets so many questions to the reader in her story, questions which will almost certainly be answered wrongly, that no one is likely to nod over it, and even the most experienced reader of romances will fail to steer an unerring course and reach the harbour of solution through the quicksands and shoals of blood, diamonds, secret service, impersonation, kidnapping, and violence with which the mystery is guarded."

The unnamed reviewer in The Observer (7 September 1924) wrote: "Miss Christie has done one bold and one regrettable thing in this book. She has dispensed with Hercule Poirot, her own particular Sherlock Holmes, to whose presence and bonhomie and infallibility the success of her previous books has been mainly due." After comparing Poirot with Harry Rayburn, the reviewer continued by saying that the book, "will be something of a disappointment to those who remember The Mysterious Affair at Styles. It is an excellent and ingenious complexity, in its way, but it might have been written by quite a number of the busy climbers who now throng this particular slope of Parnassus. One almost suspects that Miss Christie contemplates exchanging the mantle of Conan Doyle for that of Miss Dell; a hazardous manoeuvre, for the two authoresses are very different in tastes and sympathies." The reviewer went on to say that, "The plan of the book is rather confused. There is a prologue which does not link itself up with the rest of the story for quite a long time; and the idea of giving alternate passages from the diaries of the heroine and of Sir Eustace Pedler is not altogether justified by the glimpses it gives of that entertaining but disreputable character. One of the points on which some readers will have doubts is as to the plausibility of the villain: assuredly he is a novel type in that role. The book, like all Miss Christie's work, is written with spirit and humour."

Robert Barnard said about this novel that it was "Written during and about a trip to Southern Africa, this opens attractively with the heroine and her archeologist father (Agatha's interest in the subject was obviously pre-Max), and has some pleasant interludes with the diary of the baddie. But it degenerates into the usual stuff of her thrillers, and the plot would probably not bear close examination, if anyone were to take the trouble."

Some additional blurbs regarding the book, and used by The Bodley Head for advertising subsequent print runs, are as follows:

- "A capital tale – mystery piled on mystery, incident on incident." – Referee.

- "Agatha Christie has written a most entertaining story, excellently conceived and executed." – Morning Post.

== Development of the novel ==
The book has some parallels to incidents and settings of a round-the-world work trip taken by Christie with her first husband Archie Christie and headed by his old teacher from Clifton College, Major E A Belcher, to promote the forthcoming 1924 British Empire Exhibition. The tour lasted from 20 January to 1 December 1922. It was on the tour that Christie wrote the short stories which would form all of Poirot Investigates (1924) and most of the contents of Poirot's Early Cases, published in 1974.

Dining with the Christies before the trip, Belcher had suggested setting a mystery novel in his home, the Mill House at Dorney and naming the book The Mystery of the Mill House; and had insisted on being in it as well. He is the inspiration for the central character Sir Eustace Pedler, having been given a title at Archie's suggestion. The Mill House also makes an appearance, albeit located in Marlow.

Christie found Belcher "childish, mean and somehow addictive as a personality: 'Never, to this day, have I been able to rid myself of a sneaking fondness for Sir Eustace', wrote Agatha of the fictionalised Belcher, a main character in The Man in the Brown Suit. 'I dare say it's reprehensible, but there it is.'" In Agatha Christie: The Grand Tour, Christie writes that for all his shortcomings, she and Archie "did not keep to our vow of never speaking to Belcher again...To our enormous surprise, we found that we actually liked Belcher, that we enjoyed his company."

== Adaptations ==
=== Television ===
==== US adaptation ====
The Man in the Brown Suit aired in the US on 4 January 1989, adapted by Alan Shayne Productions, in association with Warner Brothers Television. It is set in a later era than the 1920s, and many details are changed as a result: the setting, for instance, is Cairo. At least one review found the story lacking, feeling that those adaptations of Christie's novels shown on PBS in the United States fared better than this one, which aired on CBS.

Adaptor: Carla Jean Wagner
Director: Alan Grint

Main Cast:

- Stephanie Zimbalist – Anne Beddingfeld
- Rue McClanahan – Suzy Blair
- Tony Randall – Rev Edward Chichester
- Edward Woodward – Sir Eustace Pedler
- Ken Howard – Gordon Race
- Nickolas Grace – Guy Underhill
- Simon Dutton – Harry Lucas
- María Casal – Anita
- Federico Luciano – Leo Carton
- Rose McVeigh – Valerie

==== French adaptation ====
The novel was adapted as a 2017 episode of the French television series Les Petits Meurtres d'Agatha Christie.

=== Graphic novel ===
The Man in the Brown Suit was released by HarperCollins as a graphic novel adaptation on 16 July 2007, and, on 3 December 2007 was adapted by Hughot and illustrated by Bairi (ISBN 0-00-725062-2). This was translated from the edition first published in France by Emmanuel Proust éditions in 2005 under the title of L'Homme au complet marron.

== Publication history ==
The first UK edition retailed at seven shillings and sixpence (7/6) (Note: Equivalent to £20 in 2025.) and the US edition at $2.00. (Note: Equivalent to $38 in 2025.)

- 1924, John Lane (The Bodley Head), 22 August 1924, Hardcover, 312 pp
- 1924, Dodd Mead and Company (New York), 1924, Hardcover, 275 pp
- 1949, Dell Books (New York), 1949, Paperback, (Dell number 319 [mapback]), 223 pp
- 1953, Pan Books, 1953, Paperback, (Pan number 250), 190 pp
- 1958, Pan Books, 1958, Paperback, (Great Pan G176)
- 1978, Panther Books (London), 1978, 192 pp; ISBN 0-586-04516-3
- 1984, Ulverscroft Large Print Edition, Hardcover; ISBN 0-7089-1125-0
- 1988, Fontana Books (Imprint of HarperCollins), 1988, Paperback, 240 pp; ISBN 0-00-617475-2
- 2007, Facsimile of 1924 UK first edition (HarperCollins), 5 November 2007, Hardcover, 312 pp; ISBN 0-00-726518-2
- 2020, Vintage Books (imprint of Penguin Random House), January 2020, Paperback, 265 pp; ISBN 978-1-9848-9940-8

Following completion in late 1923, The Man in the Brown Suit was first serialised in the London Evening News under the title Anne the Adventurous. It ran in fifty instalments from Thursday, 29 November 1923 to Monday, 28 January 1924. There were slight amendments to the text, either to make sense of the openings of an instalment (e.g. changing "She then..." to "Anne then..."), or omitting small sentences or words. The main change was in the chapter divisions. The published book has 36 chapters whereas the serialisation has only 28 chapters.

In her 1977 Autobiography Christie refers to it as Anna the Adventuress. The change from her preferred title was not of her choosing and the newspaper's choice was one that she considered to be "as silly a title as I have ever heard". She raised no objections, however, as the Evening News were paying her £500 (£26,282 in current terms) for the serial rights which she and her family considered an enormous sum. At the suggestion of her first husband Archie, Christie used the money to purchase a grey, bottle-nosed Morris Cowley. She later stated that acquiring her own car ranked with dining at Buckingham Palace as one of the two most exciting incidents in her life.

Christie was less pleased with the dustjacket of the book, complaining to the Bodley Head that the illustration, by an unnamed artist, looked as if the incident at the Tube Station occurred in "mediaeval times", when she wanted something "more clear, definite and modern". The Bodley Head were anxious to sign a new contract with Christie, now recognising her potential, but she wanted to move on, feeling that "they had not treated a young author fairly". The US serialisation was in the Blue Book magazine in three instalments from September (Volume 39, Issue 5) to November 1924 (Volume 40, Issue 1) with each issue containing an uncredited illustration.

=== Book dedication ===
Christie's dedication in the book reads:
"To E.A.B. In memory of a journey, some Lion stories and a request that I should some day write the Mystery of the Mill House".

"E A B" refers to Major E A Belcher (see Development of the novel above).

=== Dustjacket blurb ===
The dustjacket front flap of the first edition carried no specially written blurb. Instead both the front and back flap carried adverts for other Bodley Head novels.
