= Poems (Christie collection) =

1973 collection of poetry by Agatha Christie

- First edition cover (Book was issued without an illustrated dustjacket, but with a glassine wrapper)
- Author: Agatha Christie
- Cover artist: Not known
- Language: English
- Genre: Poetry
- Publisher: William Collins & Sons
- Publication date: October 1973
- Publication place: United Kingdom
- Media type: Print (hardback)
- Pages: 128 (first edition, hardback)
- ISBN: 0-00-211681-2
- OCLC: 859459
- Dewey Decimal: 821/.9/12
- LC Class: PR6005.H66 A6 1973b
- Preceded by: Postern of Fate
- Followed by: Poirot's Early Cases

Poems is the second of two collections of poetry by crime writer Agatha Christie, the first being The Road of Dreams in January 1925. It was published in October 1973 at the same time as the novel Postern of Fate, the final work she ever wrote.

The book is divided into two volumes with the first part, which occupies over half of the book, being titled Volume I and is stated on the copyright page to be a reprint of the contents of The Road of Dreams (incorrectly dated to 1924) however there are several differences between the two publications. They are:

- Pierrot Grown Old, which in 1925 appears as the last poem in the overall book, appears in 1973 between the verses The Last Song of Columbine and Epilogue: Spoken by Punchinello within the overall sequence titled A Masque from Italy.
- Islot of Brittany, which appears between the verses The Bells of Brittany and Dark Sheila in the sequence titled Ballads in 1973 does not appear in the 1925 volume.
- Beatrice Passes, which in 1925 appears between the verses The Road of Dreams and Heritage in the Dreams and Fantasies sequence appears in the 1973 version in Volume II.
- A Palm Tree in Egypt in the sequence Other Poems in 1925 is retitled A Palm Tree in the Desert in 1973.
- In a Dispensary, one of the most quoted poems Christie wrote, which in 1925 appears between the verses Easter, 1918 and To a Beautiful Old Lady in the sequence Other Poems does not appear in the 1973 volume.

The remainder of the 1973 publication, titled Volume II was, like its predecessor, divided into four sections:

- Things
- Places
- Love Poems and Others
- Verses of Nowadays

One of the poems in the sequence Love Poems and Others is entitled To M.E.L.M. in Absence. The dedicatee of this poem is Christie's second husband Max Mallowan or Max Edgar Lucien Mallowan to give him his full name. It is not known when the poem was written however the only prolonged absence the married coupled ever suffered was in the Second World War when Max was sent to Egypt with the British Council in February 1942 and after several years and different postings in North Africa, did not return home until May 1945. Both Christie's autobiography and her official biography are silent on the subject of whether or not this poem dates from this period.

Dustjackets of Remembrance and My Flower Garden, both illustrated by Richard Allen

Remembrance, another poem in the same sequence, is a poem about the loss of a loved one and was reprinted in a small sixteen-page volume of the same name in 1988 by the Souvenir Press with illustrations by Richard Allen (ISBN 0-285-62876-3) The following year, the Souvenir Press published another of the poems from the collection, My Flower Garden, again in a small sixteen-page volume with illustrations by Richard Allen (ISBN 0-285-62888-7)

== Publication history ==
- 1973, William Collins and Sons (London), October 1973, Hardcover, 124 pp ISBN 0-00-211681-2
- 1973, Dodd, Mead and Company (New York), Hardcover, 124 pp ISBN 0-396-06859-6
- 1996, Bantam Books, Hardcover, 182 pp, ISBN 0-553-35103-6
